= Cecil Irwin =

Cecil Irwin may refer to:

- Cecil Irwin (musician) (1902–1935), American jazz reed player and arranger
- Cecil Irwin (footballer) (1942–2025), English footballer
