= 1935 in jazz =

- Decade: 1930s in jazz
- Music: 1935 in music
- Standards: List of 1930s jazz standards
- See also: 1934 in jazz – 1936 in jazz

This is a timeline documenting events of jazz in the year 1935

== Events ==
- The beginning of the “Swing Era”.
- Ella Fitzgerald won a one-week performance at the Harlem Opera House.

== Deaths ==
January

- 31 – Edwin Swayze, American jazz trumpeter and composer (born 1906).

May

- 3 – Cecil Irwin, American jazz reed player and arranger (born 1902).

July

- 21 – Honoré Dutrey, dixieland jazz trombonist (born 1894).

April

- 2 – Bennie Moten, American jazz pianist and band leader (born 1894).

November

- 27 – Charlie Green, jazz trombonist, and the soloist in the Fletcher Henderson orchestra (born 1893).

== Births ==
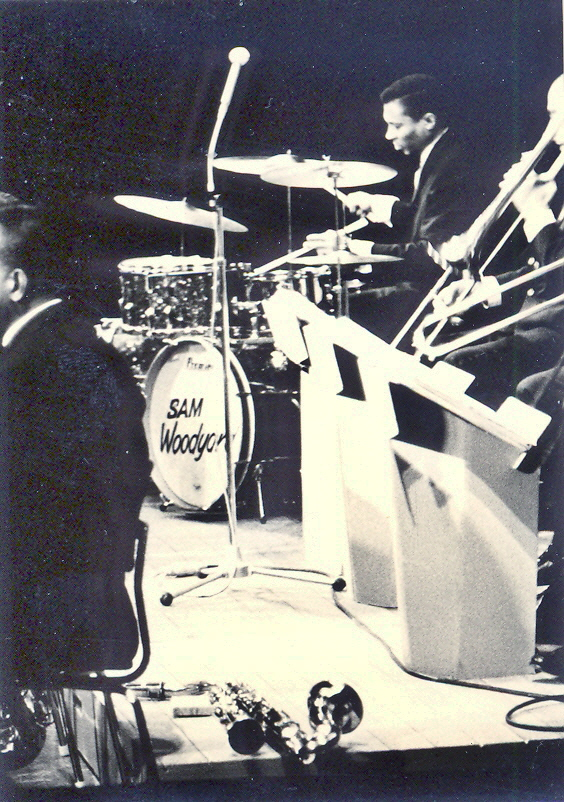
Sam Woodyard in 1965

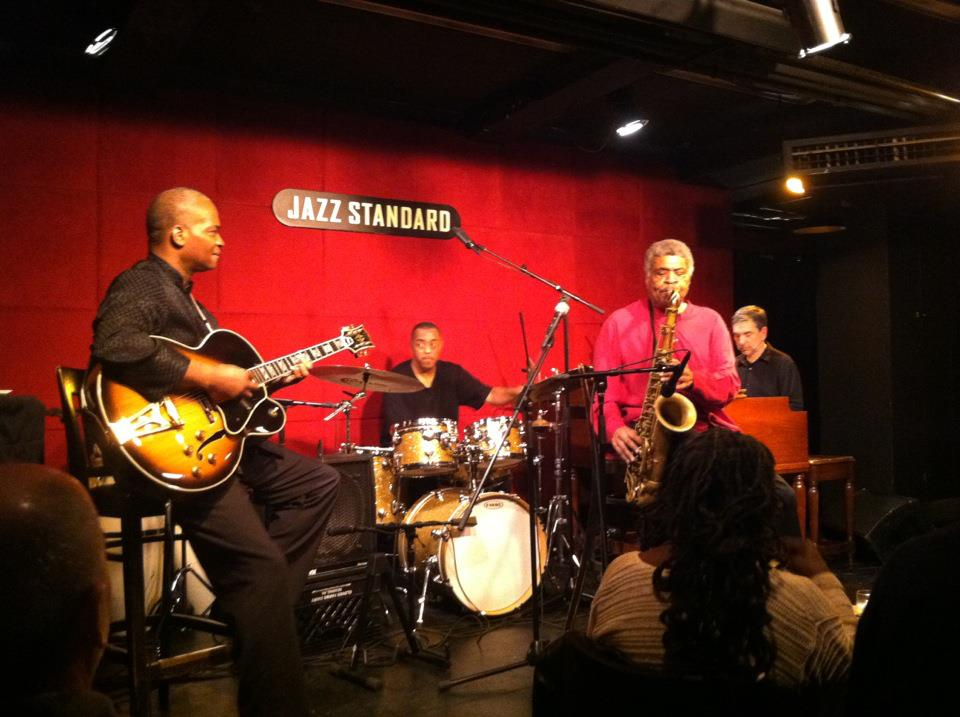
The George Coleman Quintet, 2012

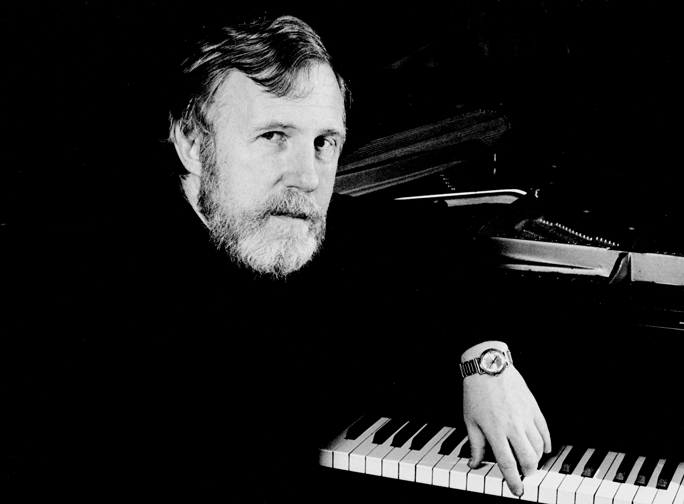
Ran Blake at Bach Dancing & Dynamite Society, Half Moon Bay, California, June 14, 1987

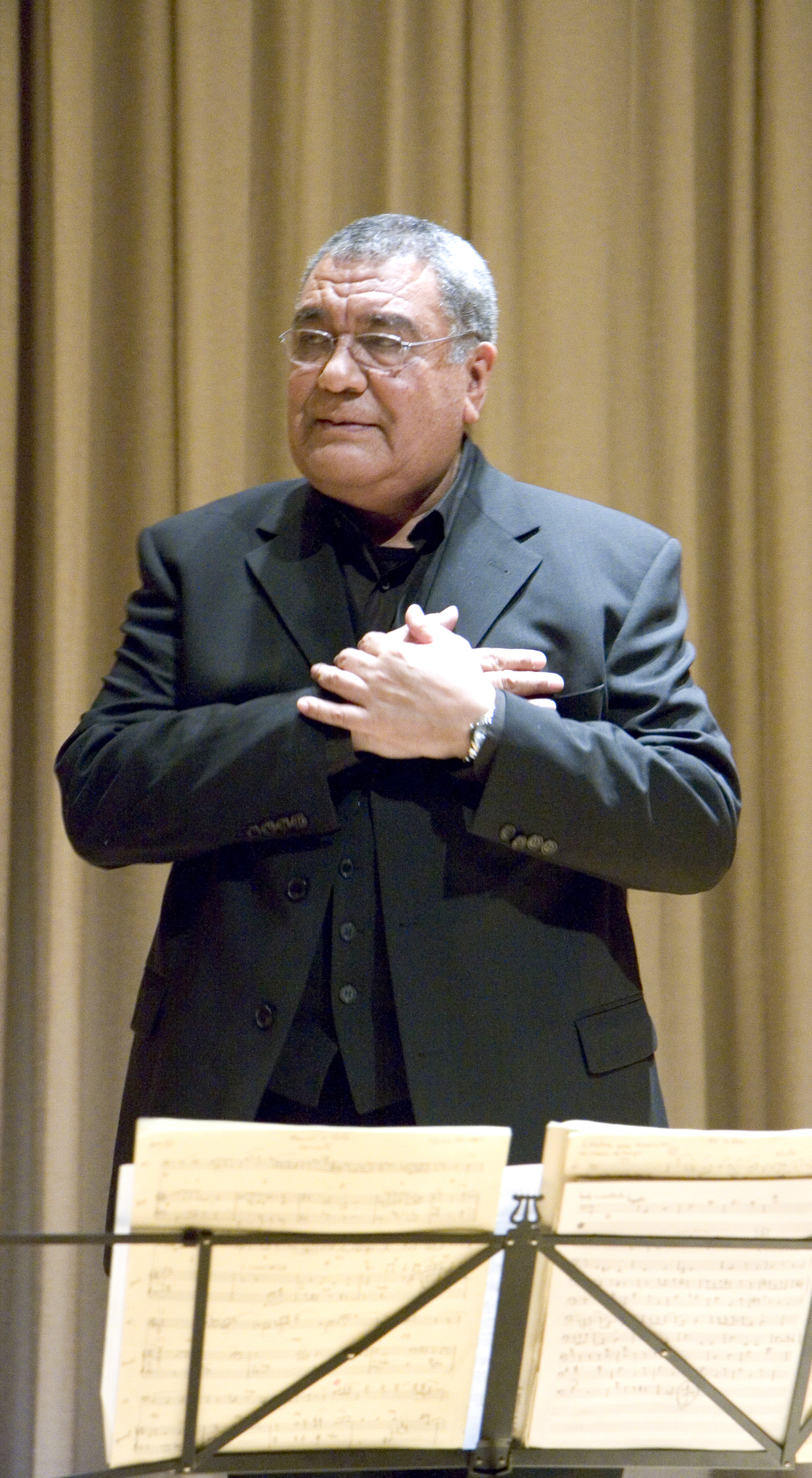
Dino Saluzzi

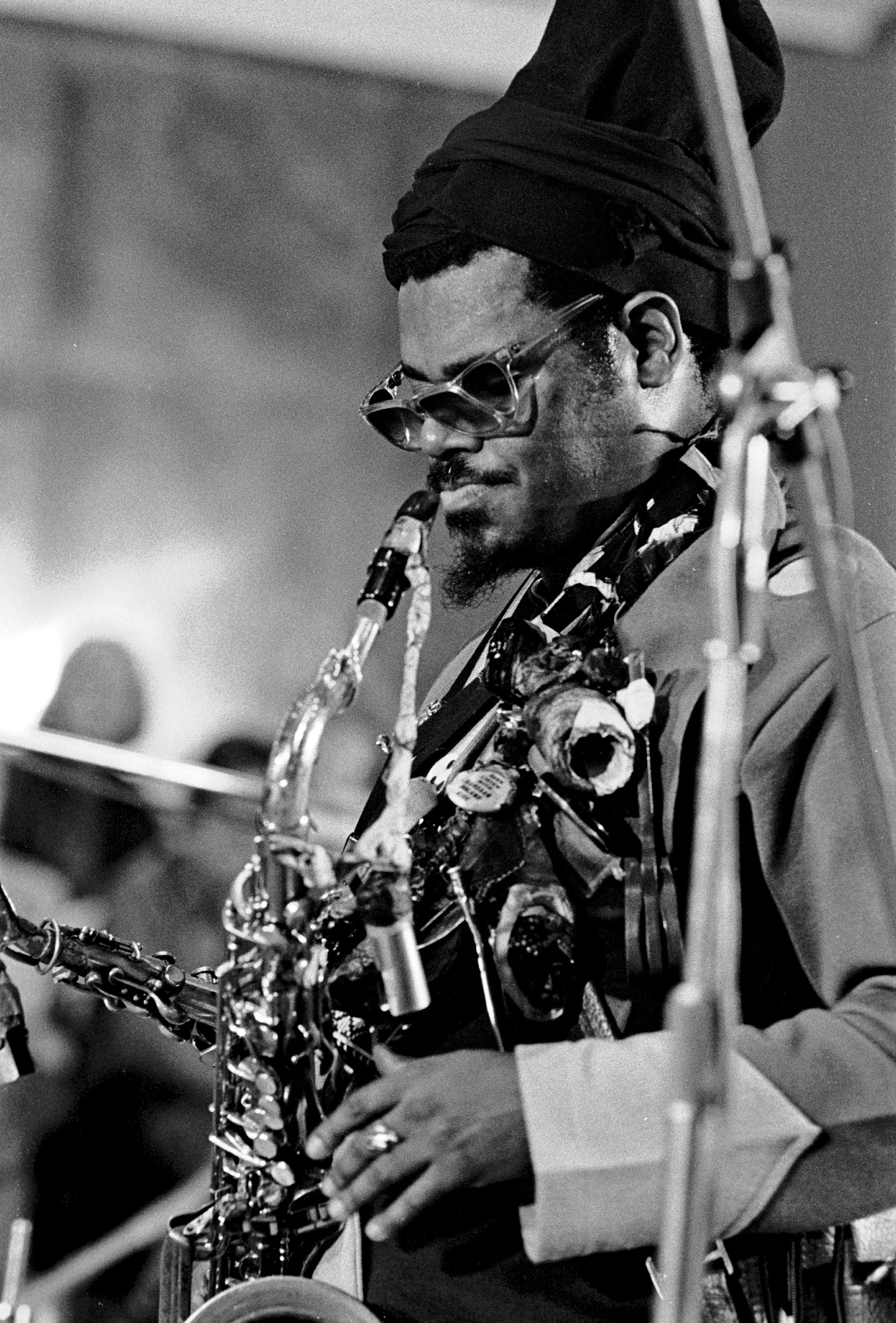
Rahsaan Roland Kirk performing in 1972

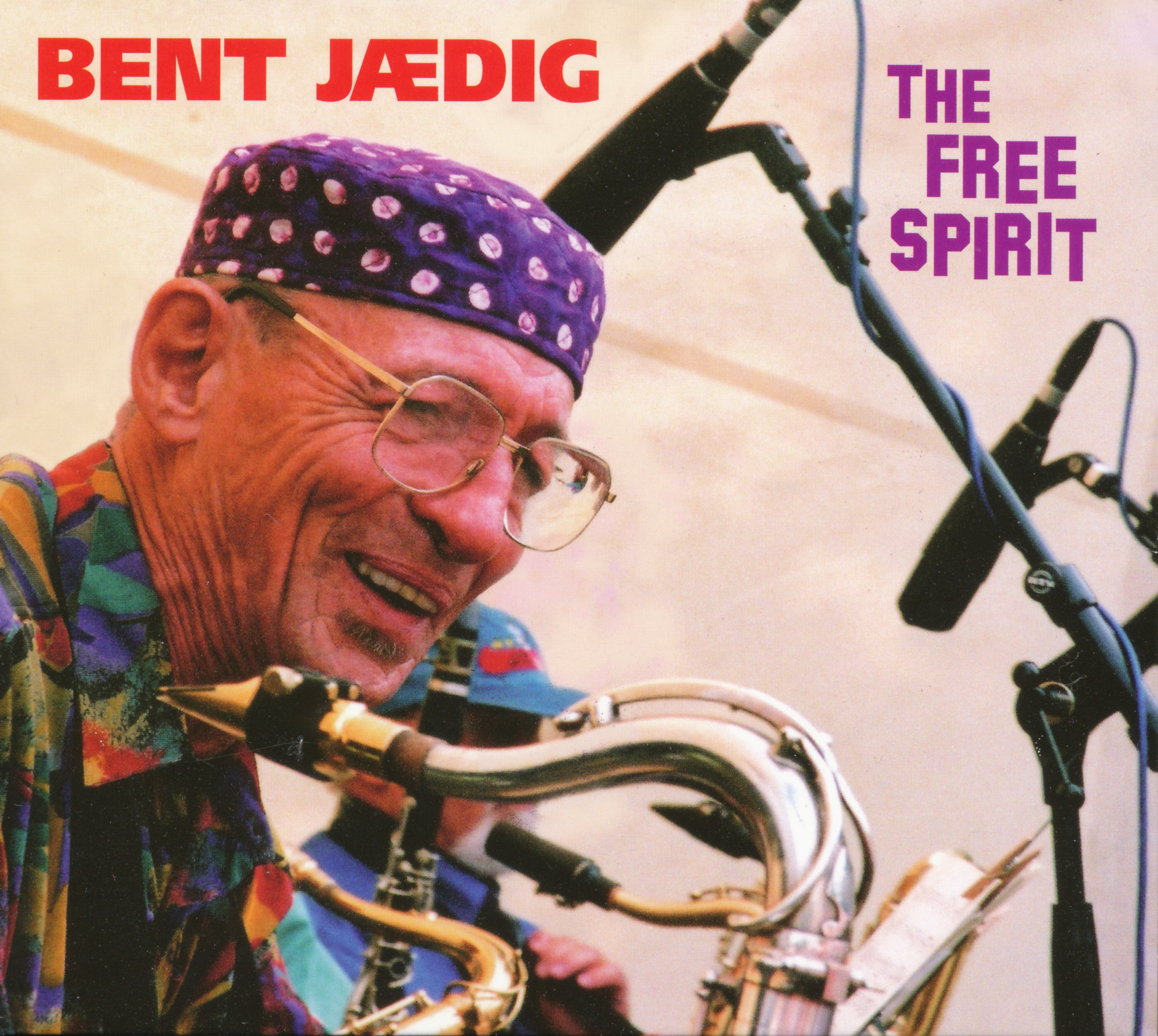
Bent Jædig in 2010

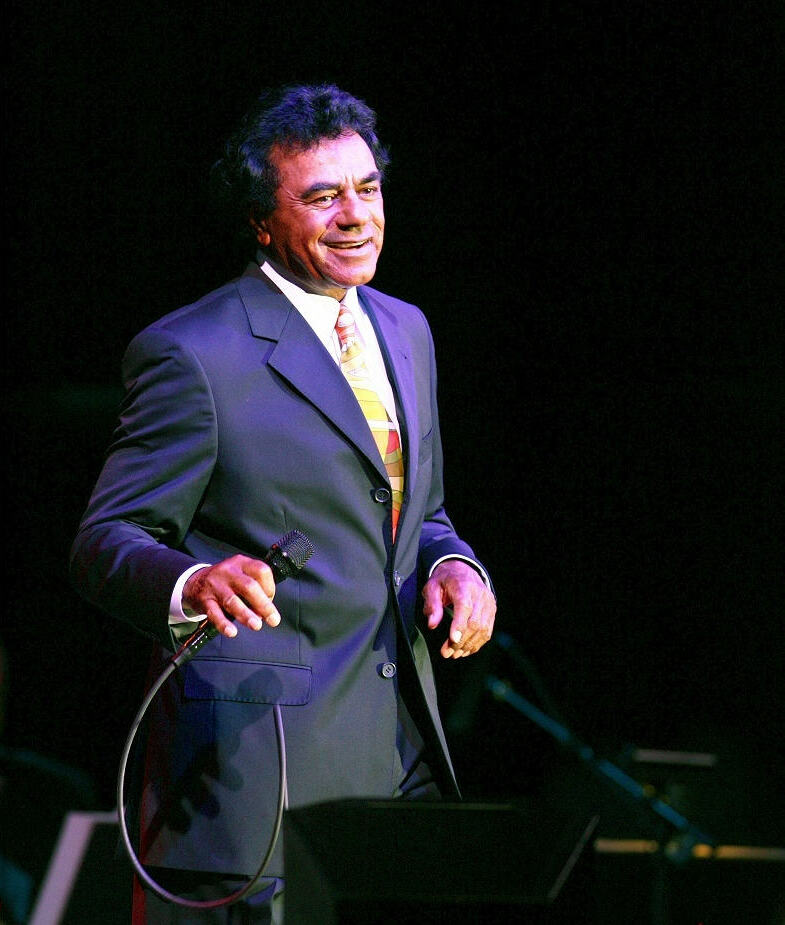
Johnny Mathis in concert at the Chumash Casino Resort in Santa Ynez, California, on May 25, 2006

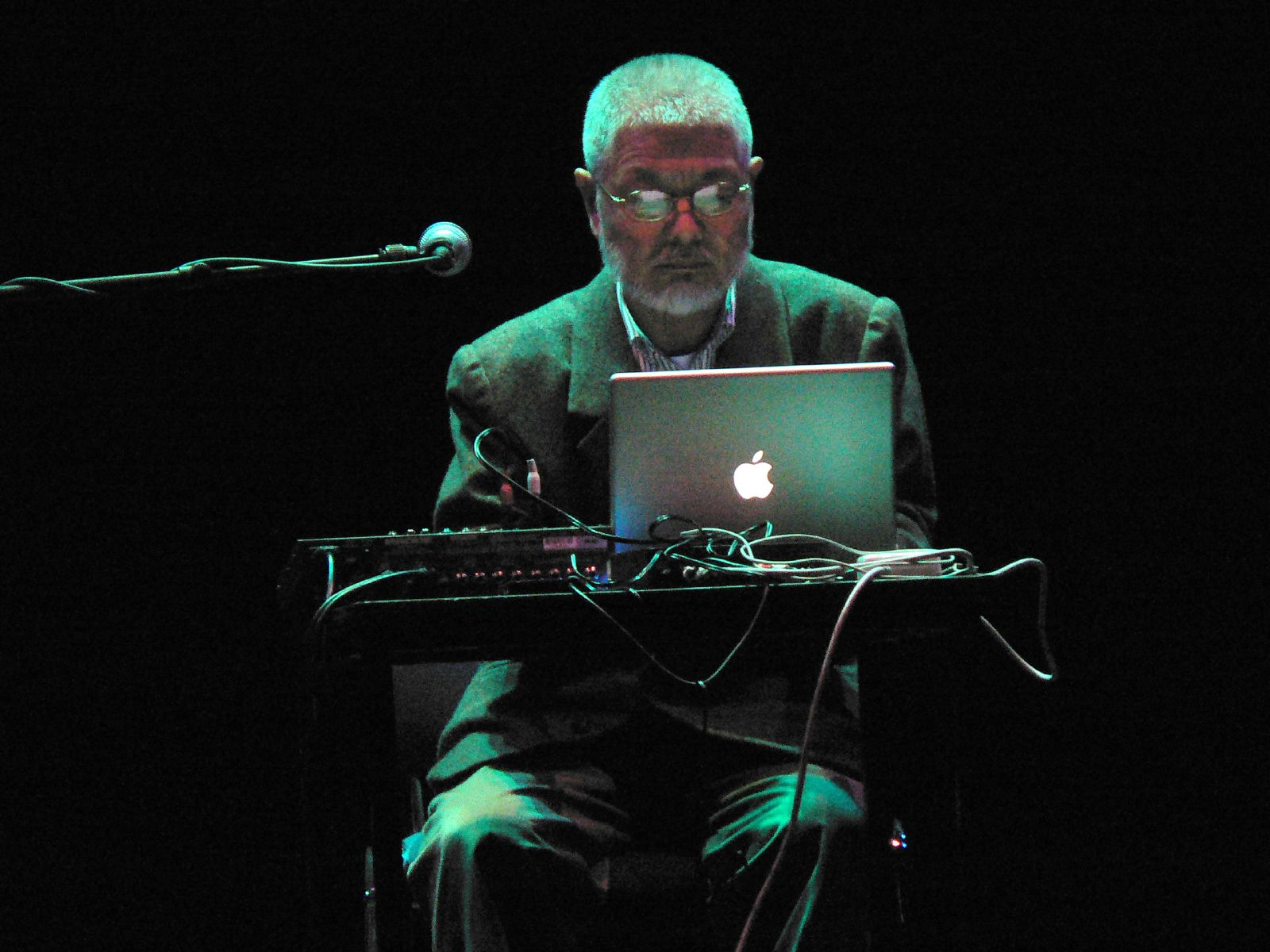
Composer Yasunao Tone in 2007

January

- 5 – Chuck Flores, American drummer (died 2016).
- 6 – Nino Tempo, American musician, singer, and actor.
- 7
  - Kenny Davern, American clarinetist (died 2006).
  - Sam Woodyard, American drummer (died 1988).
- 18 – Rodgers Grant, American pianist (died 2012).
- 30 – Tubby Hayes, English saxophonist and multi-instrumentalist (died 1973).

February

- 10 – Johnny Helms, American trumpeter (died 2015).
- 14 – Rob McConnell, Canadian trombonist (died 2010).
- 20 – Orlando Marin, American band leader and timbales player.

March

- 8 – George Coleman, American saxophonist.
- 12 – Hugh Lawson, American pianist (died 1997).
- 14 – Getatchew Mekurya, Ethiopian saxophonist (died 2016).
- 16 – Emil Mijares, Filipino vibist and pianist (died 2007).
- 30 – Karl Berger, German pianist, composer and educator (died 2023).
- 31 – Herb Alpert, American trumpeter and record executive.

April

- 1 – Alan Haven, English organist (died 2016).
- 9 – Reuben Wilson, American organist (died 2023).
- 10 – Jerzy Milian, Polish vibraphonist (died 2018).
- 15 – Gene Cherico, American upright bassist (died 1994).
- 19 – Dudley Moore, English pianist and actor (died 2002).
- 20
  - Herbie Phillips, American trumpeter (died 1995).
  - Ran Blake, American pianist, composer, and educator.
- 22 – Paul Chambers, American upright bassist (died 1969).
- 23 – Milton Banana, Brazilian drummer (died 1998).
- 24 – Allan Jaffe, American jazz tubist (died 1987).

May

- 1
  - Henry Grimes, American upright bassist, violinist, and poet (died 2020).
  - Heraldo do Monte, Brazilian guitarist.
- 4 – Don Friedman, American pianist (died 2016).
- 5 – Kidd Jordan, American saxophonist (died 2023).
- 10
  - George Golla, Australian guitarist.
  - Julius Wechter, American vibraphonist and percussionist (died 1999).
- 12 – Gary Peacock, American upright bassist (died 2020).
- 19
  - Cecil McBee, American upright bassist.
  - Tore Jensen, Norwegian trumpeter.
- 20 – Dino Saluzzi, Argentinian bandoneon player.
- 21 – Terry Lightfoot, British clarinetist and bandleader (died 2013).
- 22
  - Barry Rogers, American trombonist (died 1991).
  - Giuseppi Logan, American saxophonist (died 2020).
- 24 – Valerie Capers, American pianist and composer.
- 27 – Ramsey Lewis, American composer, pianist, and radio personality (died 2022).
- 31 – Albert Heath, American drummer.

June

- 3
  - Enzo Jannacci, Italian singer-songwriter, pianist, actor, and stand-up comedian (died 2013).
  - Ted Curson, American trumpeter (died 2012).
- 5 – Misha Mengelberg, Dutch pianist and composer (died 2017).
- 6 – Grant Green, American guitarist and composer (died 1979).
- 15 – François Jeanneau, French saxophonist, flautist, and composer.

July

- 1
  - James Cotton, American blues harmonica player, singer and songwriter (died 2017).
  - Rashied Ali, American drummer (died 2009).
- 3 – Enrico Intra, Italian pianist, composer, conductor.
- 9 – Frank Wright, American saxophonist and singer (died 1990).
- 12 – John Patton, American pianist (died 2002).
- 13 – Pete Escovedo, Mexican-American percussionist.
- 29 – Julian Priester, American trombonist.

August

- 3 – Vic Vogel, Canadian pianist and trombonist (died 2019).
- 7 – Rahsaan Roland Kirk, American saxophonist and multi-instrumentalist (died 1977).
- 28 – Stan McDonald, American clarinetist and saxophonist (died 2021).

September

- 1 – Harry Beckett, British trumpeter (died 2010).
- 3 – Dorothy Masuka, South African singer (died 2019).
- 8 – James Clay, American saxophonist and flautist (died 1994).
- 9 – Fred Stone, Canadian flugelhornist, trumpeter, and pianist (died 1986).
- 16 – Gordon Beck, English pianist (died 2011).
- 23 – Les McCann, American pianist and singer.
- 25
  - Bjarne Liller, Danish banjoist and singer (died 1993).
  - Roland Alexander, American saxophonist and pianist (died 2006).
- 28 – Bent Jædig, Danish saxophonist (died 2004).
- 30 – Johnny Mathis, American singer.

October

- 3 – Judy Bailey, New Zealand-born pianist and composer (died 2025).
- 12 – Paul Humphrey, American drummer (died 2014).
- 21
  - Bobby Few, American pianist and singer (died 2021).
  - Don Rader, American trumpeter.
- 23 – Frank Hewitt, American pianist (died 2002).
- 27 – Charlie Tagawa, Japanese-American banjoist (died 2017).

November

- 3 – Harry Leahey, American guitarist (died 1990).
- 9 – Jimmy D'Aquisto, Italian-American luthier|guitar maker (died 1995).
- 17 – Roswell Rudd, American trombonist and composer (died 2017).
- 23 – Alvin Fielder, American drummer (died 2019).
- 27 – Michel Portal, French composer, saxophonist, and clarinetist.

December

- 1 – Woody Allen, American filmmaker and clarinetist.
- 2 – Ronnie Mathews, American pianist (died 2008).
- 5 – Totti Bergh, Norwegian saxophonist (died 2012).
- 12 – Juhani Aaltonen, Finnish saxophonist and flautist.
- 17 – Ronnie Boykins, American bassist (died 1980).
- 19 – Bobby Timmons, American pianist and composer (died 1974).
- 22 – Joe Lee Wilson, American singer (died 2011).
- 23 – Esther Phillips, American singer (died 1984).
- 26 – Noel Kelehan, Irish musician and conductor, RTÉ Concert Orchestra (died 2012).
- 31 – Peter Herbolzheimer, German trombonist and bandleader (died 2010).

Unknown date

- Eddie Khan, American upright bassist (died 1980s).
- Trevor Koehler, American saxophonist (died 1975).
- Tülay German, Turkish singer.
- Yasunao Tone, Japanese artist.
