= 2004 in jazz =

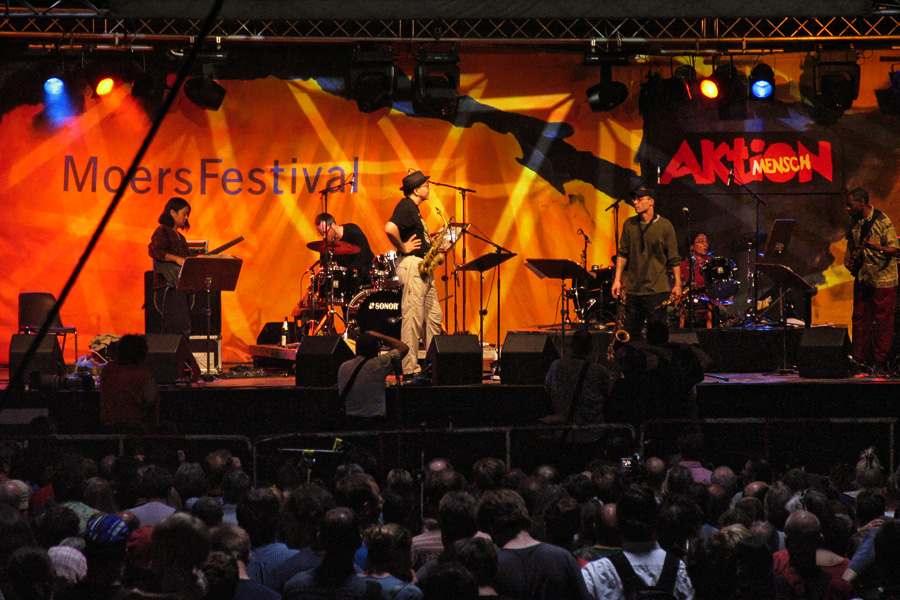
- Ned Rothenberg Double Band at Moers Festival Germany 2004.
- Decade: 2000s in jazz
- Music: 2004 in music
- Standards: List of jazz standards
- See also: 2003 in jazz – 2005 in jazz

This is a timeline documenting events of jazz in the year 2004.

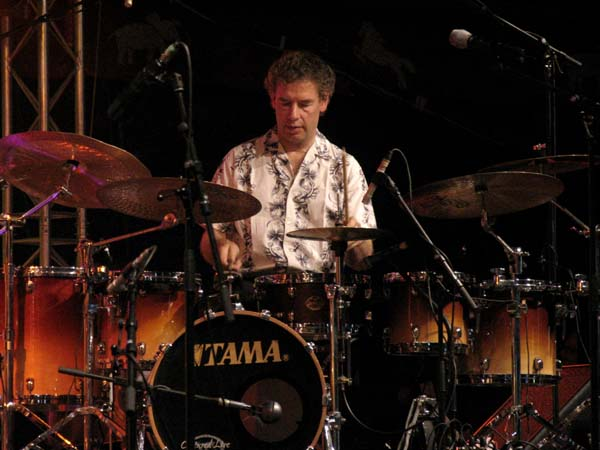
Bill Bruford at Moers Festival 2004.

== Events ==
=== January ===
- 22 – The 7th Polarjazz started in Longyearbyen, Svalbard (January 22 – 25).
- 30 – The 23rd annual Djangofestival started on Cosmopolite in Oslo, Norway (January 30 – 31).

=== March ===
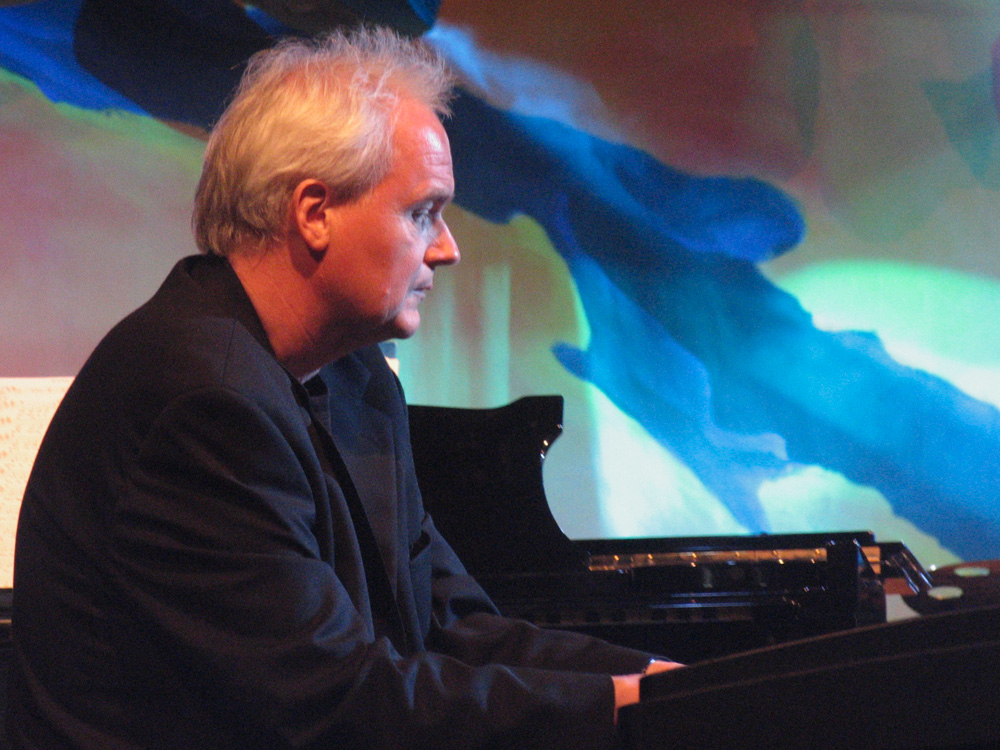
Ketil Bjørnstad, at the Moers Festival Germany 2004.

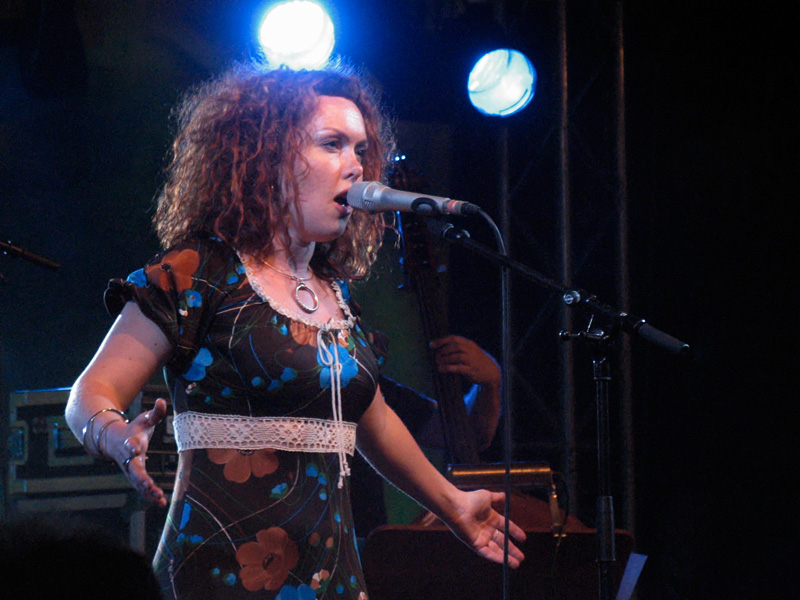
Kristin Asbjørnsen, at the Moers Festival Germany 2004.

=== April ===
- 2
  - The 31st Vossajazz started at Vossavangen, Norway (April 2 – 4).
  - Magne Thormodsæter was awarded Vossajazzprisen 2004.
- 3 – Svein Folkvord performs the commissioned work Across for Vossajazz 2004.

=== May ===
- 19 – The 32nd Nattjazz started in Bergen, Norway (May 19 – 29).
- 28 – The 33rd Moers Festival started in Moers, Germany (May 28 – 31).

=== June ===
- 28 – The 16th Jazz Fest Wien started in Vienna, Austria (June 28 – July 14).
- 30
  - The 40th Kongsberg Jazzfestival started in Kongsberg, Norway (June 30 – July 3).
  - The 25th Montreal International Jazz Festival started in Montreal, Quebec, Canada (June 30 - July 11).

=== July ===
- 2
  - The 26th Copenhagen Jazz Festival started in Copenhagen, Denmark (July 2 – 11).
  - The 38th Montreux Jazz Festival started in Montreux, Switzerland (July 2 – 17).
- 9 – The 29th North Sea Jazz Festival started in The Hague, Netherlands (July 9 – 11).
- 12 – The 44th Moldejazz started in Molde, Norway (July 12 – 17).
- 17
  - The 21st Stockholm Jazz Festival started in Stockholm, Sweden (July 17 – 24).
  - The 39th Pori Jazz Festival started in Pori, Finland (July 17 – 25).
- 21 – The 57th Nice Jazz Festival started in Nice, France (July 21 – 28).
- 23 – The 39th San Sebastian Jazz Festival started in San Sebastian, Spain (July 23 – 28).

=== August ===
- 9 – The 19th Oslo Jazzfestival started in Oslo, Norway (August 9–15).
- 11
  - The 50th Newport Jazz Festival started in Newport, Rhode Island (August 11 – 15).
  - The 18th Sildajazz started in Haugesund, Norway (August 11 – 15).
- 13 – The 21st Brecon Jazz Festival started in Brecon, Wales (August 13 – 15).

=== September ===
- 17 – The 47th Monterey Jazz Festival started in Monterey, California (September 17 – 19).

=== November ===
- 12 – The 13th London Jazz Festival started in London, England (November 12 – 21).

== Album released ==
=== March ===
Day	Album	Artist	Label	Notes	Ref.
9	Memphis Jazz Box	Various Artists	Select-O-Hits	Produced by Jack Cooper	

=== August ===
Day	Album	Artist	Label	Notes	Ref.
24	Unspeakable	Bill Frisell	Nonesuch Records	Produced by Hal Willner. Grammy Award for Best Contemporary Jazz Album	
31	Land of the Sun	Charlie Haden	Verve Records	Produced by Gonzalo Rubalcaba, Ruth Cameron, Grammy Award for Best Latin Jazz Album	
31	Genius Loves Company	Ray Charles and Various Artists	Concord/Hear Music	Produced by John Burk and Phil Ramone. Grammy Award for Album of the Year and Record of the Year.	

=== Unknown date ===
#

S

- Maria Schneider and the Maria Schneider Orchestra: Concert in the Garden

== Deaths ==
January

- 11 – Anthony Lacen, American tubist and band leader (born 1950).
- 15 – Randolph Colville, Scottish clarinettist, saxophonist, bandleader, and arranger (born 1942).
- 22
  - Billy May, American composer, arranger, and trumpeter (born 1916).
  - Milt Bernhart, American trombonist (born 1926).
- 25 – J. R. Mitchell, American drummer and educator (born 1937).
- 30
  - Frank Mantooth, American pianist and arranger (born 1947).
  - Malachi Favors, American bassist (born 1927).

February

- 12 – Preston Love, American alto saxophonist, bandleader, and songwriter (born 1921).
- 14 – Walter Perkins, American drummer (born 1932).
- 15 – Gil Coggins, American pianist (born 1928).
- 16 – Ella Johnson, American jazz and rhythm and blues vocalist (born 1919).
- 23
  - Don Cornell, American singer (born 1919).
  - Neil Ardley, English pianist and composer (born 1937).
- 26
  - Jack Sperling, American drummer (born 1922).
  - Jimmy Coe, American saxophonist (born 1921).

March

- 9
  - Coleridge-Taylor Perkinson, American composer (born 1932).
  - John Mayer, Indian composer (born 1929).
  - Tony Lee, British pianist (born 1934).
- 16 – Hank Marr, American Hammond B-3 organist (born 1927).
- 18 – Wallace Davenport, American trumpeter (born 1925).
- 29 – Colin Smith, English trumpeter (born 1934).

April

- 17 – Joe Kennedy Jr., American jazz violinist and educator (born 1923).

May

- 6 — Barney Kessel, American guitarist (brain cancer) (born 1923).
- 12 – John LaPorta, American clarinetist, composer and educator (born 1920).
- 17 – Elvin Jones, American drummer, John Coltrane Quartet (born 1927).
- 21 – Rick Henderson, American saxophonist and arranger (born 1928).
- 25 – John R. T. Davies, English trombonist, trumpeter, alto saxophonistaudio, and sound engineer (born 1927).

June

- 4 — Steve Lacy, saxophonist and composer (born 1934).
- 9 — Bent Jædig, Danish tenor saxophonist and flautist (born 1935).
- 10 – Ray Charles, American singer-songwriter, musician, and composer (born 1930).
- 17 – Jackie Paris, American guitarist and singer (born 1924).

July

- 20 – James Williams, American pianist (born 1951).
- 22 – Illinois Jacquet, American saxophonist (born 1922).

August

- 2 — Don Tosti, American musician and composer (born 1923).
- 7 — G. T. Hogan, American drummer (born 1929).
- 9 — Tony Mottola, American guitarist (born 1918).
- 14 – Pete Strange, English trombonist (born 1938).

September

- 10 – Gordon Brisker, American tenor saxophonist (born 1937).
- 19 – Waldren Joseph, American trombone (born 1918).
- 23 – Lucille Dixon Robertson, American upright bassist (born 1923).
- 27 – Louis Satterfield, American bassist and trombonist, The Pharaohs (born 1937).

October

- 2
  - Bjørnar Andresen, Norwegian bassist (born 1945).
  - Max Geldray, Dutch harmonica player (born 1916).
- 3 — Vernon Alley, American bassist (born 1915).
- 10 – Calvin Jones, American trombonist, bassist, pianist, bandleader, and composer (born 1929).
- 15 – Bill Eyden, English drummer (born 1930).
- 24 – Joe Springer, American pianist (born 1916).
- 28
  - Gil Mellé, American saxophonist (born 1931).
  - Robin Kenyatta, American alto saxophonist (born 1942).

November

- 1 — Mark Ledford, American trumpeter, singer, and guitarist (born 1960).
- 3 — Joe Bushkin, American pianist (born 1916).
- 6 — Pete Jolly, American pianist and accordionist (born 1932).
- 14 – Michel Colombier, French composer, arranger, and conductor (born 1939).
- 18 – Cy Coleman, American composer, songwriter, and pianist (born 1929).
- 20 – Bob Maize, American upright bassist (born 1945).
- 23 – Billy "Uke" Scott, British ukulele player, composer, singer, and entertainer (born 1923).

December

- 12 – Frank Isola, American drummer (born 1925).
- 17 – Dick Heckstall-Smith, English saxophonist (born 1934).
- 26 – Sigurd Køhn, Norwegian saxophonist (tsunami) (born 1959).
- 27 – Hank Garland, American guitarist (born 1930).
- 30 – Artie Shaw, American clarinetist, composer, bandleader, and actor (born 1910).

== See also ==
- List of years in jazz
- 2000s in jazz
- 2004 in music
