= 2016 in jazz =

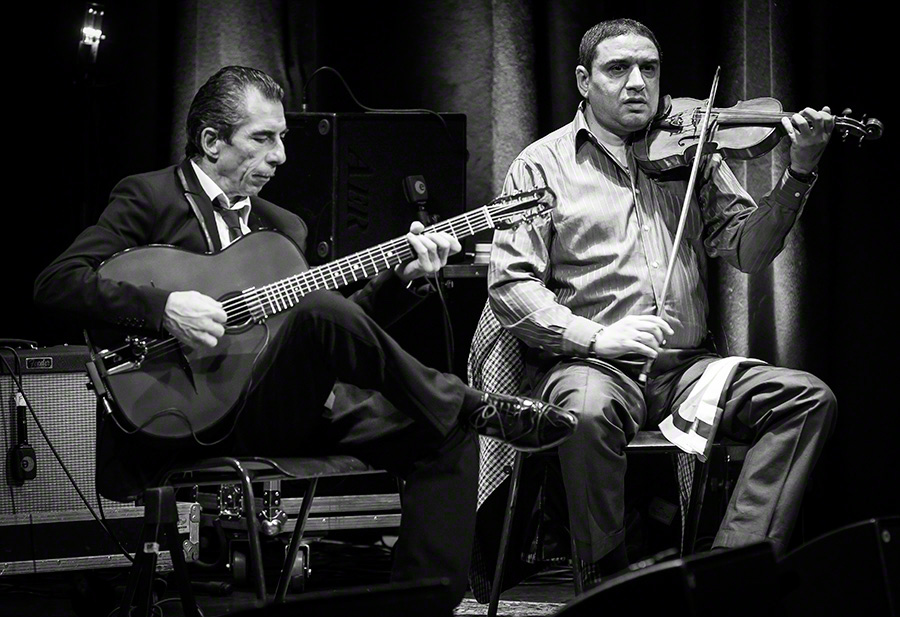
- Angelo Debarre Quartet performs at Cosmopolite venue in Oslo, Norway during the Django festival 2016.
- Decade: 2010s in jazz
- Music: 2016 in music
- Standards: List of jazz standards
- See also: 2015 in jazz – 2017 in jazz

This is a timeline documenting jazz events in the year 2016.

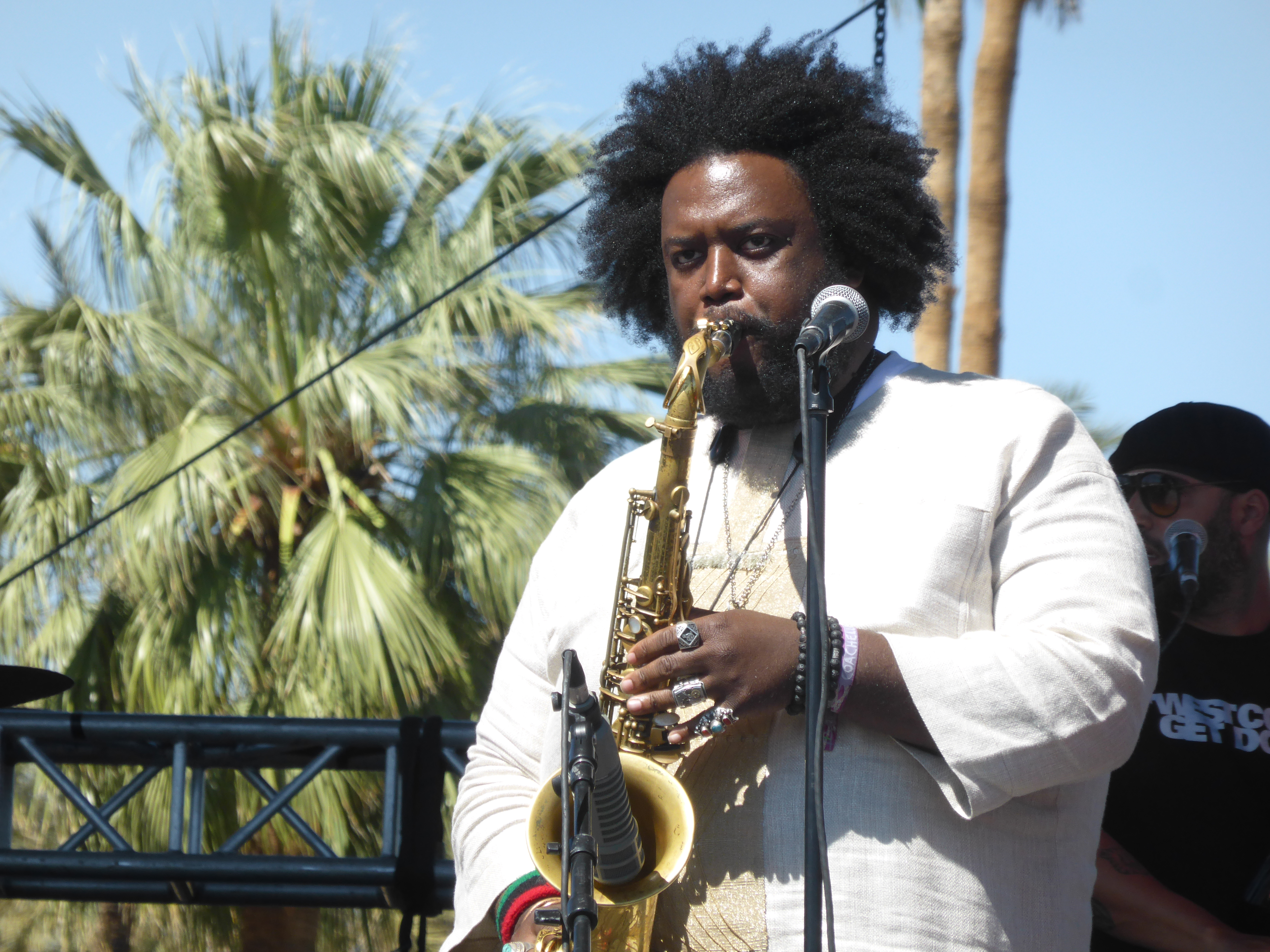
Kamasi Washington performing at the 2016 Coachella event

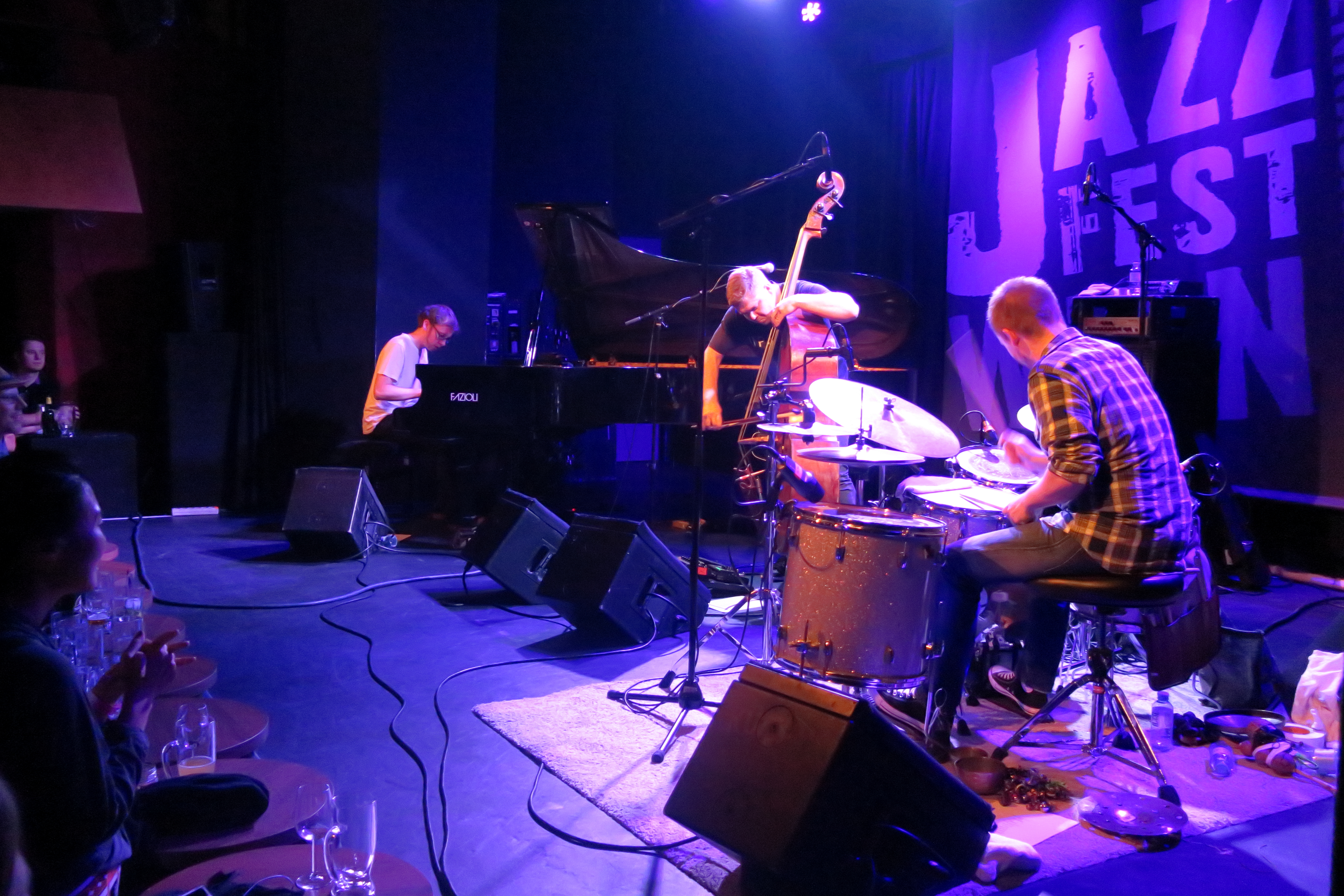
GoGo Penguin performing at a concert in Vienna, Austria

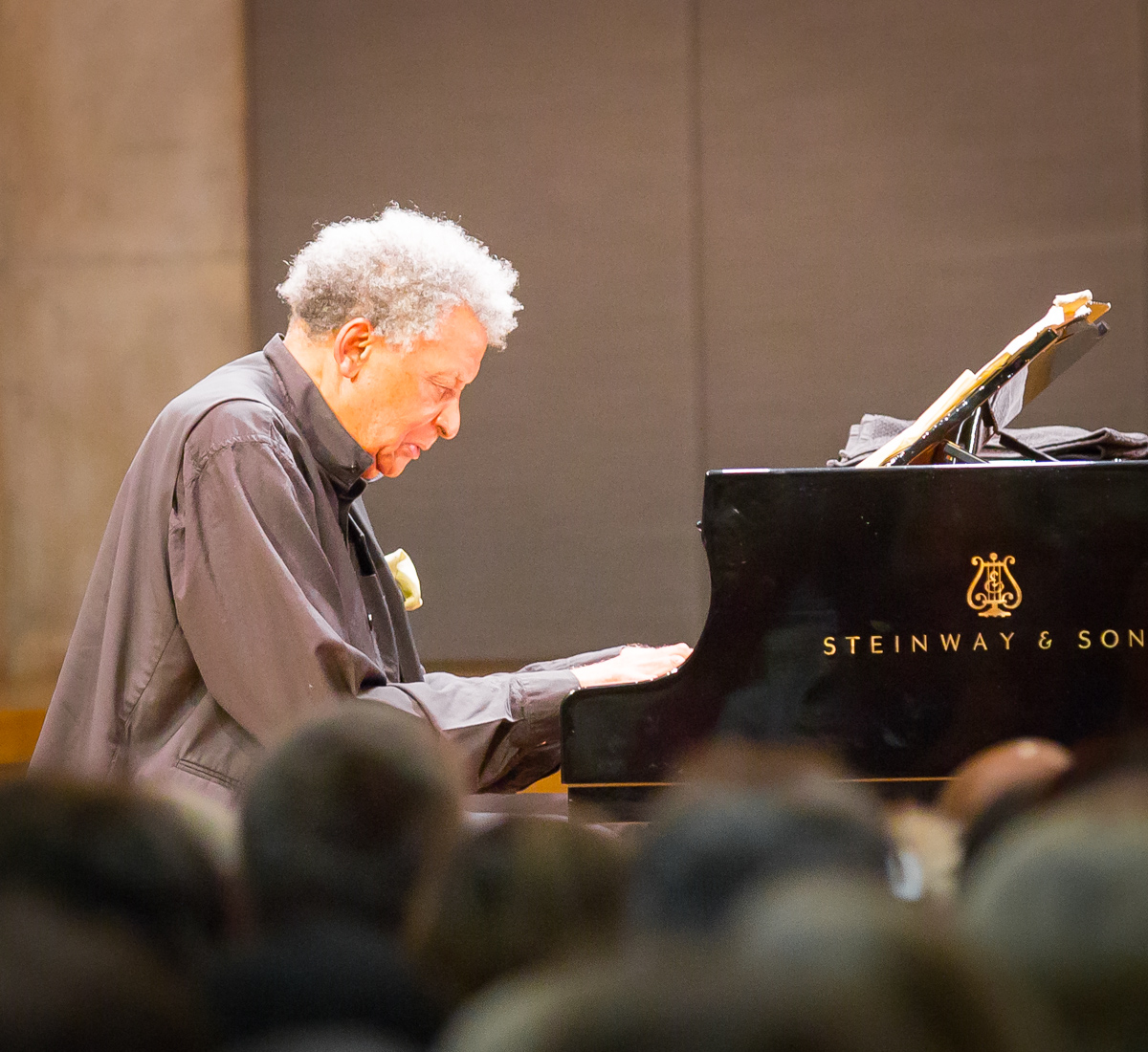
Abdullah Ibrahim at the Oslo Jazzfestival

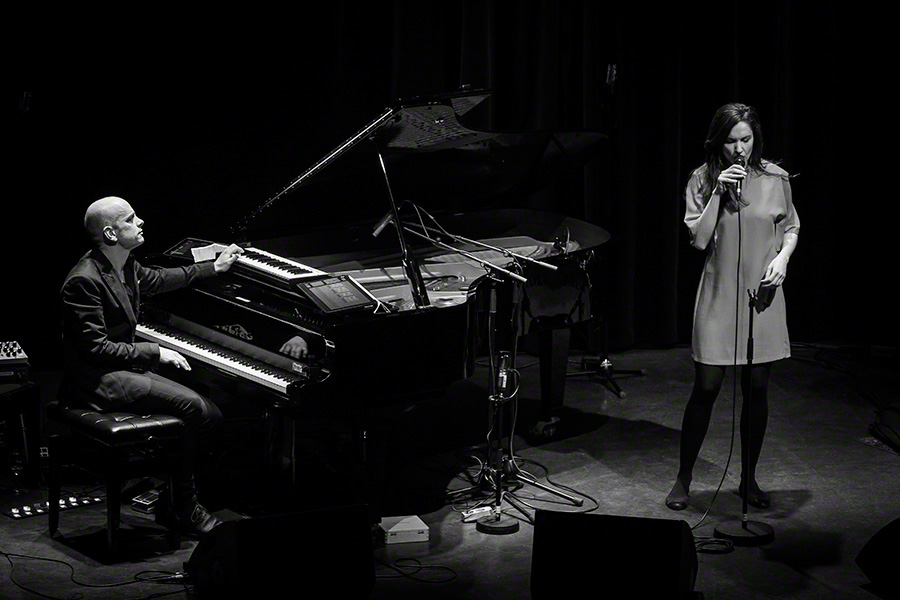
Tord Gustavsen with Simin Tander 2016 at Cosmopolite, Oslo, Norway

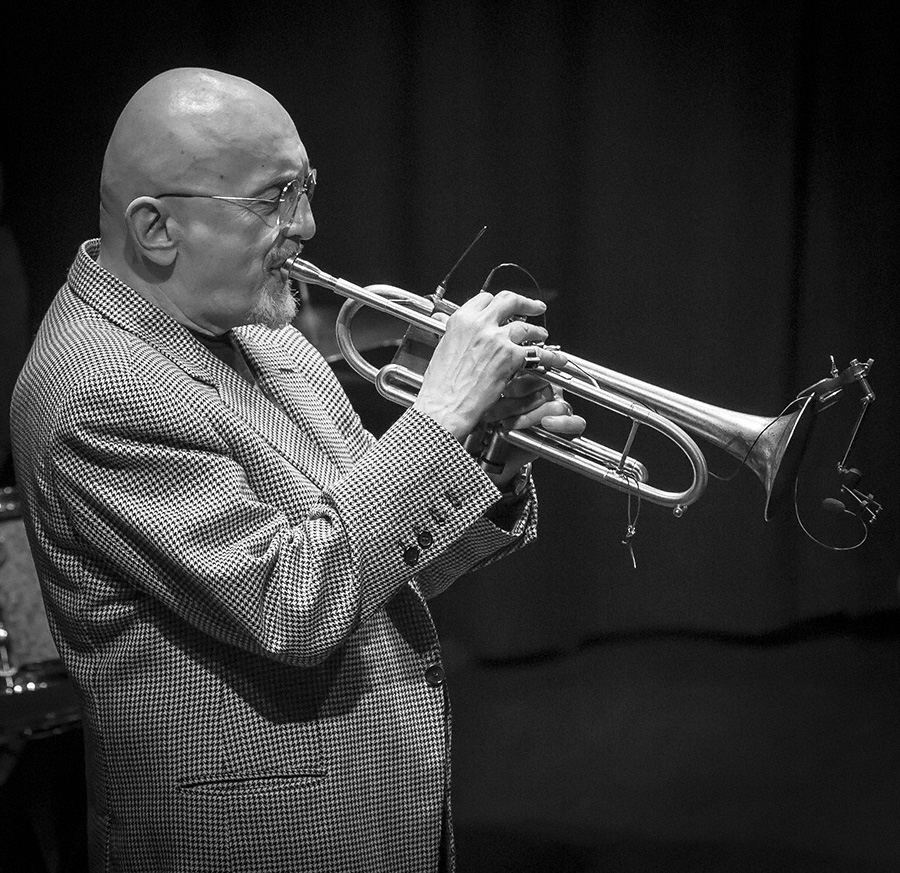
Tomasz Stanko 2016 at Cosmopolite, Oslo, Norway

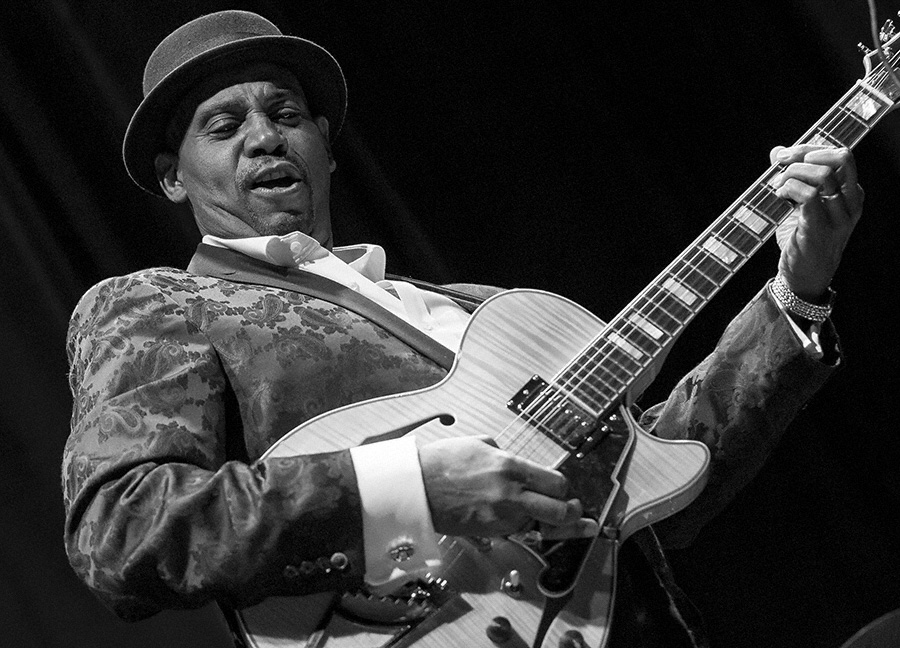
Allan Harris 2016 at Cosmopolite, Oslo, Norway

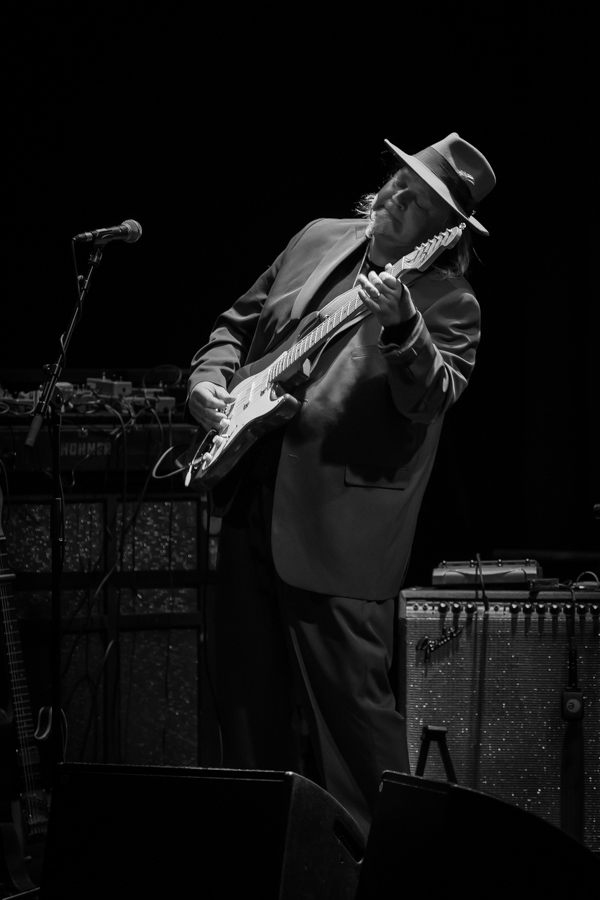
Knut Reiersrud Band 2016 at Cosmopolite, Oslo, Norway

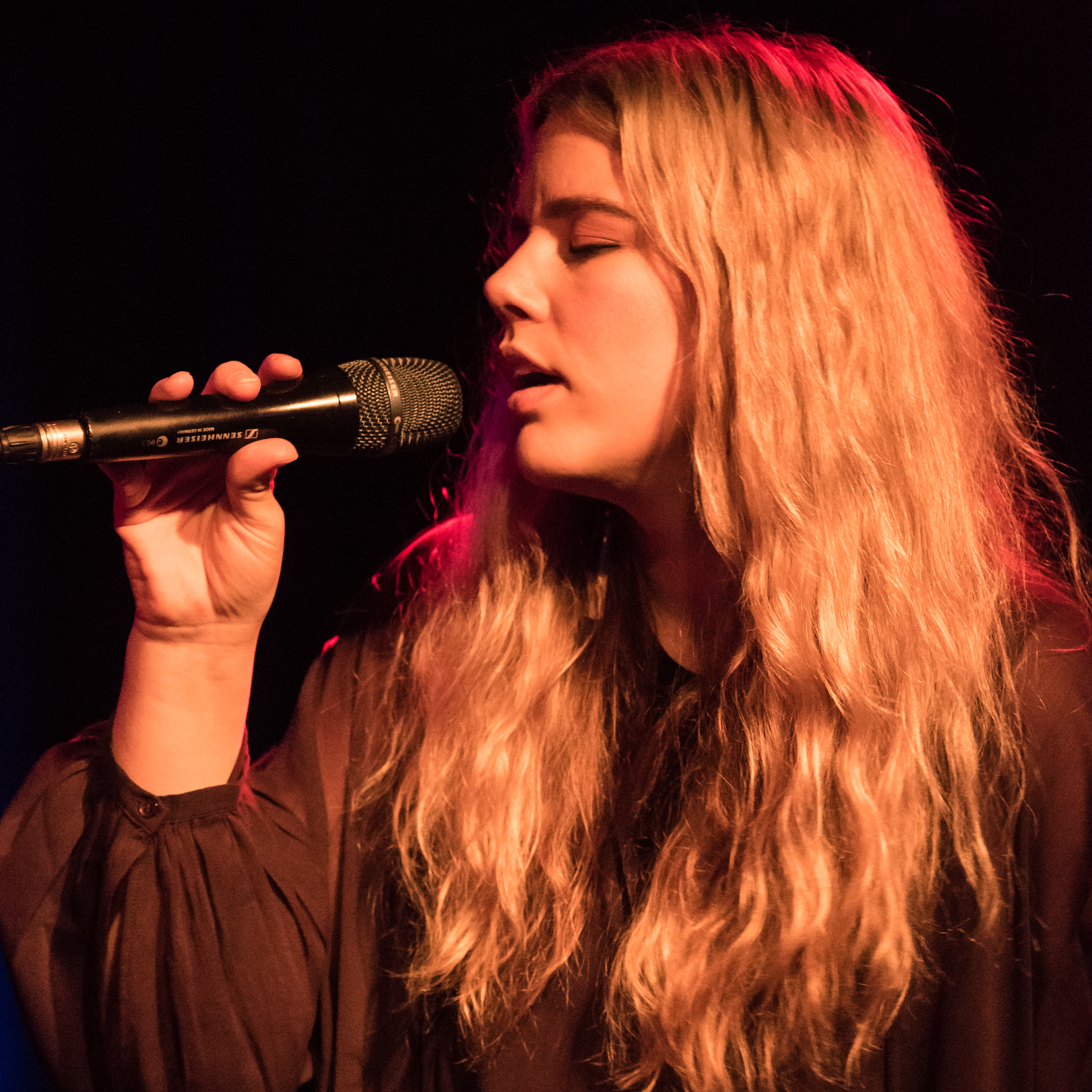
Natalie Sandtorv at the 2016 Moers Festival

== Events ==
=== March ===
- Blue Note Entertainment Group expands into China, opening a location in Beijing

=== April ===
- April 15-April 24 - The 2016 Coachella event occurs. Jazz musicians in attendance include Kamasi Washington, and GoGo Penguin

=== September ===
- 24-26 - The Joy of Jazz Festival, one of the premiere Jazz festivals in South Africa, occurs

== Albums ==
Month	Day	Album	Artist	Label	Notes	Ref.
January	8	Blackstar	David Bowie	ISO, Columbia, RCA, Sony Music	Produced by David Bowie, Tony Visconti	
January	8	Kindred Spirits Live at Chan's	Greg Abate and Phil Woods	Whaling City Sound		
January	15	Amorphae	Ben Monder, Pete Rende, Andrew Cyrille, Paul Motian	ECM	Produced by Sun Chung	
January	15	I Long To See You	Charles Lloyd & The Marvels	Blue Note		
January	19	Quiver	Ralph Alessi, Gary Versace, Drew Gress, Nasheet Waits	ECM	Produced by Manfred Eicher	
January	21	The Boop-A-Doo	Cherry Poppin' Daddies	Space Age Bachelor Pad Records	Produced by Steve Perry	
January	22	Klangkammer 2	Stian Omenås	NorCD	Executive producer Karl Seglem	
January	29	Groove Travels	Gerard Presencer	Edition		
January	29	Into The Silence	Avishai Cohen	ECM	Produced by Manfred Eicher	
January	29	What Was Said	Tord Gustavsen, Simin Tander, Jarle Vespestad	ECM	Produced by Manfred Eicher	
January	29	Momento	Ayumi Tanaka Trio	AMP Records		
January	29	When You Wish Upon a Star	Bill Frisell	Okeh	Produced by Lee Townsend	
February	1	Forms & Poses	Christian Meaas Svendsen	Nakama	Produced by Christian Meaas Svendsen	
February	1	Lars Danielsson Songbook	Lars Danielsson	ACT		
February	5	Kuria Suite	Knut Kristiansen and Bergen Big Band	Grappa		
February	11	District Six	Andreas Loven	Losen		
February	12	The Distance	Michael Formanek and Ensemble Kolossus	ECM		
February	12	Warp	Jon Balke	ECM	Produced by Jon Balke and Manfred Eicher	
February	12	Dream Keeper	André Fernandes	Edition		
February	12	The Theory Of Joy	Ian Shaw	Jazz Village		
February	14	Story Of I	Myrna	Tomtom & Braza		
February	16	Mare Nostrum II	Jan Lundgren	ACT	Produced by René Hess / HR Music, executive producer Siggi Loch	
February	19	Birdwatching	Anat Fort Trio with Gianluigi Trovesi	ECM		
February	19	Quiver	Ralph Alessi	ECM	Produced by Manfred Eicher	
February	26	Eastern Smiles	Hanna Paulsberg Concept	Odin		
February	26	In The End His Voice Will Be The Sound Of Paper	Trondheim Jazz Orchestra with Kim Myhr and Jenny Hval	Hubro	Produced by Kim Myhr	
February	26	Klangspuren	Michael Wollny Trio	ACT	Executive producer Siggi Loch (CD)	
March	3	Kanestrøm	Frode Alnæs	Øra Fonogram		
March	4	Continuum	Nik Bärtsch's Mobile	ECM	Produced by Manfred Eicher	
March	4	Emily's D+Evolution	Esperanza Spalding	Concord	Produced by Esperanza Spalding and Tony Visconti	
March	11	Arclight	Julian Lage	Mack Avenue	Produced by Jesse Harris	
March	11	A Cosmic Rhythm with Each Stroke	Vijay Iyer / Wadada Leo Smith	ECM	Produced by Manfred Eicher	
March	11	Ferenc Snétberger in Concert	Ferenc Snétberger	ECM	Produced by Manfred Eicher	
March	11	Culturen	Skadedyr	Hubro	International release in May 2016	
March	18	Beauty & Truth	Joachim Kühn	ACT	Produced by Joachim Kühn, executive producer Siggi Loch	
March	18	Crystal Rain	Céline Bonacina Crystal Quartet	Cristal Records		
March	25	Full Circle	Brian Bromberg	Artistry Music		
March	25	Let's Dance	Per Oddvar Johansen	Edition		
March	30	The Dance Upon My Grave	COKKO (Marte Eberson, Natalie Sandtorv, Ole Mofjell)	Playdate Records		
April	1	Alba	Markus Stockhausen / Florian Weber	ECM	Produced by Manfred Eicher	
April	1	Black Ice	Wolfert Brederode Trio	ECM	Produced by Manfred Eicher	
April	1	Black Orpheus	Masabumi Kikuchi	ECM	Produced by Manfred Eicher	
April	3	Tocororo	Alfredo Rodriguez	Mack Avenue		
April	7	Debonaire	Ike Moriz	Mosquito Records London Pty Ltd.	Recorded at Paris Studios, Cape Town	
April	8	Parallax	Phronesis	Edition Records	Produced by Phronesis	
April	15	Live at Montreux 1993	Al Jarreau	Eagle Rock Records		
April	15	Thick as Thieves	Mongrel – Thomas Litleskare, Ayumi Tanaka, Stian Andersen, Tore Flatjord	Losen Records		
April	22	Cohearence	Yellowjackets	Mack Avenue	Produced by Bob Mintzer, Dane Alderson, Maria Ehrenreich, Russell Ferrante, William Kennedy, Yellowjackets	
April	22	Triangle	Susanna	SusannaSonata		
April	29	Amputation	Stian Westerhus	House of Mythology		
April	29	Culcha Vulcha	Snarky Puppy	Ropeadope Records		
April	29	Held	Jason Rebello	Edition Records	Produced by Dave Stapleton & Jason Rebello	
April	29	Sun Blowing	Danielsson Neset Lund	ACT Music	Produced by Morten Lund & Lars Danielsson, executive producer Siggi Loch	
April	29	The Ystad Concert - A Tribute To Jan Johansson	Jan Lundgren	ACT Music	Produced by Jan Lundgren, executive producer Siggi Loch	
May	6	Andando el Tiempo	Carla Bley / Andy Sheppard / Steve Swallow	ECM	Produced by Manfred Eicher	
May	6	In Movement	Jack DeJohnette / Ravi Coltrane / Matthew Garrison	ECM	Produced by Manfred Eicher	
May	6	Cuong Vu Trio Meets Pat Metheny	Cuong Vu Trio meets Pat Metheny	Nonesuch Records	Produced by Cuong Vu	
May	6	One	Tim Garland	Edition Records	Produced by Tim Garland	
May	6	The Unity Sessions	Pat Metheny	Nonesuch Records	Produced by Pat Metheny	
May	20	La Mascarade	Rolf Lislevand	ECM Records	Produced by Manfred Eicher	
May	26	Vyamanikal	Kit Downes & Tom Challenger	Slip Records		
May	27	Everything's Beautiful	Miles Davis & Robert Glasper	Columbia, Blue Note	Produced Robert Glasper, associate producer Rashad Ringo Smith	
May	27	Invisible Man	Jukka Perko Avara	ACT Music	Produced by Siggi Loch	
May	27	Logos	Gerardo Nunez, Ulf Wakenius & Cepillo	ACT Music	Produced by Gerardo Núñez, executive producer Siggi Loch	
May	27	Solitary Moon	Liv Stoveland	Ponca Jazz Records		
May	27	Stranger Things Have Happened	Clare Maguire	Virgin Records	Produced by Clare Maguire	
June	3	Blues and Ballads	Brad Mehldau Trio	Nonesuch Records	Produced by Brad Mehldau	
June	3	Upward Spiral	Branford Marsalis Quartet & Kurt Elling	Sony Music Entertainment	Nominated for the Grammy Award for Best Jazz Vocal Album at the 59th Annual Grammy Awards	
June	10	Convergence	Warren Wolf	Mack Avenue Records		
June	10	Short Stories	Dominick Farinacci	Mack Avenue Records		
June	10	Wolf Valley	Eyolf Dale	Edition Records		
June	24	Arclight	Julian Lage	Mack Avenue	Produced by Jesse Harris	
June	24	The Way We Play	Marquis Hill	Concord Jazz		
July	1	Freetown Sound	Blood Orange	Domino	Produced by Dev Hynes	
July	9	Sounds of 3	Per Mathisen Trio (including Frode Alnæs and Gergő Borlai)	Losen Records		
July	22	Everybody Has A Plan Until They Get Punched in the Mouth	Charlie Hunter	GroundUP		
July	29	Rubicon	Mats Eilertsen	ECM	Produced by Manfred Eicher	
July	29	Unstatic	Manu Katche	Anteprima Productions		
August	5	Apokaluptein	Live Maria Roggen	Kirkelig Kulturverksted	Produced by Live Maria Roggen	
August	19	Femte	Isglem	NorCD	Produced by Karl Seglem	
August	19	Norwegian Caravan	Come Shine - Kringkastingsorkesteret	Lawo Classics	Produced by Erlend Skomsvoll, Vegard Landaas	
August	19	Presents MONK'estra, Volume 1	John Beasley	Mack Avenue Records		
August	26	How Long Is Now?	Rantala Danielsson Erskine	ACT Music	Produced by Siggi Loch	
August	26	Into The Mystic	David Helbock	ACT Music	Produced by Siggi Loch	
August	26	Snowmelt	Marius Neset	ACT Music	Produces by Marius Neset with Anton Eger	
August	26	It's Hard	The Bad Plus	Okeh Records		
August	26	Air	Frode Haltli with the Trondheim Soloists and Arditti Quartet	ECM Records		
August	26	Rumi Songs	Trygve Seim	ECM Records	Produced by Manfred Eicher	
September	2	Buoyancy	Nils Petter Molvær	Okeh Records	Produced by Jo Berger Myhre, Nils Petter Molvær	
September	2	Ida Lupino	Giovanni Guidi / Gianluca Petrella / Louis Sclavis / Gerald Cleaver	ECM	Produced by Manfred Eicher	
September	2	Jazz, Fritt Etter Hukommelsen	Bushman's Revenge	Rune Grammofon		
September	2	Salmeklang	Gjermund Larsen Trio	Heilo	Recipient of the composer Spellemannprisen	
September	2	The Good Life	Till Brönner	Sony Masterworks		
September	9	Atmosphères	Tigran Hamasyan, Arve Henriksen, Eivind Aarset, and Jan Bang	ECM Records		
September	9	Changing Tides	Lukas Zabulionis	Curling Legs		
September	9	Cosmic Adventure	Scott Tixier	Sunnyside Records	Produced by Corelli Savarez, Donald Brown, François Zalacain, Schertler Group	
September	9	Grand White Silk	Torun Eriksen	Jazzland Recordings	Produced by Kjetil Dalland, Torun Eriksen	
September	9	Nearness	Joshua Redman and Brad Mehldau	Nonesuch Records		
September	9	The Deer’s Cry	Vox Clamantis – compositions by Arvo Pärt	ECM Records		
September	16	Sunrain	Haakon Graf Trio, including Erik Smith and Per Mathisen	Losen Records	Produces by Graf, Smith, and Mathisen	
September	16	Together, As One	Dinosaur	Edition Records		
September	20	Diwan Of Beauty And Odd	Dhafer Youssef	Okeh Records		
September	23	Bloom	Kim Myhr	Hubro		
September	23	Country For Old Men	John Scofield	Impulse Records	Produced by John Scofield	
September	23	Streams	Jakob Bro	ECM	Produced by Manfred Eicher	
September	23	The Art of Elegance	Kristin Chenoweth	Concord Records	Produced by Steve Tyrell	
September	23	The Declaration of Musical Independence	Andrew Cyrille Quartet	ECM Records	Produced by Sun Chung	
September	30	It's Another Wor d	Sigrun Tara Øverland with Picidae	NorCD		
September	30	Somewhere In Between	Bugge Wesseltoft	Jazzland Recordings		
October	7	Day Breaks	Norah Jones	Blue Note	Produced by Eli Wolf, Norah Jones, Sarah Oda	
October	7	Kurzsam And Fulger	Christian Wallumrød Ensemble	Hubro Music		
October	7	The Monash Sessions	Kate Ceberano	Jazzhead, MGM Distribution	Produced by James Mustafa	
October	10	Tandem	Michael Wollny & Vincent Peirani	ACT Music	Produced by Siggi Loch	
October	14	Aziza	Aziza (Dave Holland, Chris Potter, Lionel Loueke, Eric Harland)	Dare2 Records	Produced by Dave Holland, executive producer Louise Holland	
October	14	Beyond Now	Donny McCaslin	Motéma Music		
October	14	Nine Firmaments	Arne Jansen Trio	Traumton Records	Produced by Arne Jansen	
October	14	Rainbow Session	Harald Lassen	Hagen Recordings	Produced by Harald Lassen	
October	21	Her Bor	Frida Ånnevik	Grappa Music	GRLP4529	
October	21	On Behalf Of Nature	Meredith Monk Ensemble	ECM Records	Produced by Manfred Eicher	
October	28	Christmas With My Friends V	Nils Landgren	ACT Music		
October	28	EST Symphony	EST Symphony	ACT Music		
October	28	Rising Grace	Wolfgang Muthspiel with Ambrose Akinmusire, Brad Mehldau, Larry Grenadier, and Brian Blade	ECM	Produced by Manfred Eicher	
October	31	No Right No Left	Andreas Wildhagen	Nakama Records	Produced by Andreas Wildhagen	
November	4	A Multitude of Angels	Keith Jarrett	ECM Records	4xCD from solo concerts in Italy in October 1996	
November	4	Black Focus	Yussef Kamaal	Brownswood Recordings		
November	11	December Songs	Olga Konkova and Jens Thoresen	Losen Records		
November	11	StaiStua	Ulvo / Hole / Haltli	NorCD	Produced by Andreas Ulvo, Musikk I Hedmark	
November	11	The Mechanical Fair	Ola Kvernberg	Olsen Records	2xLP produced by Todd Terje	
November	12	Stories	Jan Gunnar Hoff	2L	Solo piano	
November	14	XXX	Scorch Trio (Raoul Björkenheim, Ingebrigt Håker Flaten, Frank Rosaly)	Rune Grammofon	4xLP	
November	17	My Head Is Listening	Motif	Clean Feed	Produced by Motif	
November	18	David	Eleni Karaindrou	ECM Records	Produced Manfred Eicher	
November	18	The Fifth Century	Gavin Bryars	ECM Records		
November	19	3 Pianos	Tanaka/Lindvall/Wallumrød	Nakama Records	Produced by Ayumi Tanaka, Johan Lindvall, Christian Wallumrød	
November	22	Midt På Natta	Operasjon Hegge	Particular Recordings	P!8	
November	25	The Space Between	Stuart McCallum & Mike Walker	Edition Records	Produced by Stuart McCallum	
December	2	Antenna	David Virelles	ECM Records		
December	2	New Direction	Herlin Riley	Mack Avenue Records		
December	12	Most Intimate	Nakama	Nakama Records	Produced by Christian Meaas Svendsen	
December	16	New York City Magic	Per Mathisen, Utsi Zimring, and David Kikoski	Alessa Records		
December	16	Tony Bennett Celebrates 90	Tony Bennett	Columbia		

== Deaths ==
=== January ===
- 3 – Paul Bley, Canadian pianist (born 1932).
- 4 – Long John Hunter, American guitarist and singer-songwriter (born 1931).
- 6 – Alfredo "Chocolate" Armenteros, Cuban trumpeter(born 1928).
- 7 – Alan Haven, English organist (born 1935).
- 16 – Hubert Giraud, French composer and lyricist (born 1920).
- 31 – Janusz Muniak, Polish saxophonist, flautist, arranger, and composer (born 1941).

=== February ===
- 4 – Maurice White, American singer-songwriter, musician, record producer, and bandleader, Earth, Wind & Fire (born 1941).
- 19 – Harald Devold, Norwegian saxophonist (cancer) (born 1964).
- 25 – John Chilton, British trumpeter and writer (born 1932).

=== March ===
- 9 – Naná Vasconcelos, Brazilian percussionist (born 1944).
- 10
  - Ernestine Anderson, American jazz and blues singer (born 1928).
  - Keith Emerson, English pianist and keyboardist (suicide), Emerson, Lake & Palmer (born 1944).
- 11 – Joe Ascione, American drummer (born 1961).
- 15 – Ryo Fukui, Japanese pianist (born 1948).
- 16 – Frank Sinatra Jr., American singer, songwriter, and conductor (born 1944).
- 22 – Selçuk Sun, Turkish upright bassist and composer (born 1934).
- 24 – Roger Cicero, German singer and songwriter (born 1970).
- 26 – David Baker, American symphonic jazz composer (born 1931).

=== April ===
- 2 – Gato Barbieri, Argentine saxophonist (born 1932).
- 3
  - Bill Henderson, American singer and actor (born 1926).
  - Don Francks, Canadian singer and actor (born 1932).
- 4 – Getatchew Mekurya, Ethiopian saxophonist (born 1935).
- 5 – Zena Latto, American clarinetist and saxophonist (born 1925).
- 6 – Dennis Davis, American drummer (cancer) (born 1949).
- 13
  - Jeremy Steig, American flautist (born 1942).
  - Mariano Mores, Argentine tango composer and pianist (born 1918).
  - Pete Yellin, American saxophonist and educator (born 1941).
- 21 – Prince Rogers Nelson, American singer-songwriter, multi-instrumentalist, and record producer (born 1958).
- 24
  - Billy Paul, Congolese singer and musician (born 1934).
  - Papa Wemba, American soul singer (born 1949).

=== May ===
- 1 – Doug Raney, American guitarist (born 1956).
- 6
  - Candye Kane, American singer and entertainer (pancreatic cancer) (born 1961).
  - Johannes Bauer, German trombonist (born 1954).
- 11 – Joe Temperley, Scottish saxophonist (born 1929).
- 13 – Buster Cooper, American trombonist (born 1929).
- 16 – Fredrik Norén, Swedish drummer and band leader (born 1941).

=== June ===
- 8 – Terje Fjærn, orchestra conductor ("La det swinge") (born 1942).
- 16 – Charles Thompson, American swing and bebop pianist, and organist, composer (born 1918).
- 17 – Willy Andresen, Norwegian pianist and band leader (born 1921).
- 21 – Pat Friday, American singer (born 1921).
- 23 – Shelley Moore, English-born American singer (born 1932).
- 24 – Bernie Worrell, American keyboarder and composer, Parliament-Funkadelic (born 1944).
- 26 – Mike Pedicin, American saxophonist and bandleader (born 1917).
- 30 – Don Friedman, American pianist (born 1935).

=== July ===
- 15
  - Charles Davis, American saxophonist and composer (born 1933).
  - Roland Prince, Antiguan guitarist (born 1946).
- 16 – Claude Williamson, American pianist (born 1926).
- 167 – Peter Appleyard, British–Canadian vibraphonist, percussionist, and composer (born 1928).
- 22 – Dominic Duval, American free jazz bassist (born 1944).
- 31 – Jon Klette, Norwegian saxophonist (born 1962).

=== August ===
- 5 – David Attwooll, British drummer, poet, and publisher, Henry Cow (born 1949).
- 6 – Pete Fountain, American clarinetist (born 1930).
- 13 – Connie Crothers, American pianist (cancer) (born 1941).
- 15 – Bobby Hutcherson, American vibraphone and marimba player (born 1941).
- 17 – John Fischer, American pianist, composer, and visual artist (born 1930).
- 18 – Fred Nøddelund, Norwegian flugelhornist and band leader (born 1947).
- 19
  - Derek Smith, British pianist (born 1931).
  - Horacio Salgán, Argentine tango pianist (born 1916).
- 20
  - Irving Fields, American pianist and lounge music artist (born 1915).
  - Louis Stewart, American guitarist (born 1944).
- 22 – Toots Thielemans, Belgian and American harmonica player and guitarist (born 1922).
- 25 – Rudy Van Gelder, American recording engineer (born 1924).
- 29 – Michael Di Pasqua, American drummer and percussionist (cancer) (born 1953).

=== September ===
- 24 – Buckwheat Zydeco, American accordionist and zydeco musician (lung cancer) (born 1947).
- 26 – Karel Růžička, Czech jazz pianist, composer, and music teacher (born 1940).

=== October ===
- 2 – Steve Byrd, English guitarist, Gillan and Kim Wilde (heart attack) (born 1955).
- 13 – Bhumibol Adulyadej, Thai monarch and saxophonist (born 1927).
- 18 – Mike Daniels, British trumpeter and bandleader (born 1928).
- 24 – Shirley Bunnie Foy, American singer, songwriter, and percussionist (born 1936).
- 27 – Bobby Wellins, Scottish tenor saxophonist (born 1936).

=== November ===
- 1 – Pocho La Pantera, Argentine cumbia singer (born 1950).
- 2 – Bob Cranshaw, American bassist (born 1932).
- 3 – Kay Starr, American singer (complications of Alzheimer's disease) (born 1922).
- 9 – Al Caiola, American guitarist, composer, and arranger (born 1920).
- 11 – Victor Bailey, American bass guitarist (born 1960).
- 12 – Guilherme Franco, Brazilian percussionist (born 1946).
- 13 – Leon Russell, American musician and songwriter (born 1942).
- 15 – Mose Allison, American pianist and singer (born 1927).
- 20 – Hod O'Brien, American pianist (born 1936).
- 24 – Chuck Flores, American drummer (born 1935).
- 28 – Carlton Kitto, Indian guitarist (born 1942).
- 30 – Ivar Thomassen, Norwegian folk singer, songwriter, and jazz pianist (born 1954).

=== December ===
- 6
  - Alonzo Levister, American composer, arranger, music producer, and pianist (born 1925).
  - Michael White, American violinist (born 1933).
- 7 – Greg Lake, English guitarist, bassist, singer, songwriter, and music producer (born 1947).
- 15 – Dave Shepherd, English clarinetist (born 1929).
- 18 – Léo Marjane, French singer (born 1912).
- 21 – Betty Loo Taylor, Hawaii-American pianist (born 1929).
- 23 – Carlos Averhoff, Cuban tenor saxophonist (born 1947).
- 26 – Alphonse Mouzon, American drummer and the owner of Tenacious Records (born 1948).
- 28 – Knut Kiesewetter, German trombonist, singer, songwriter, and producer (born 1941).

== See also ==
- List of 2016 albums
- List of years in jazz
- 2010s in jazz
- 2016 in music
