= 2019 in jazz =

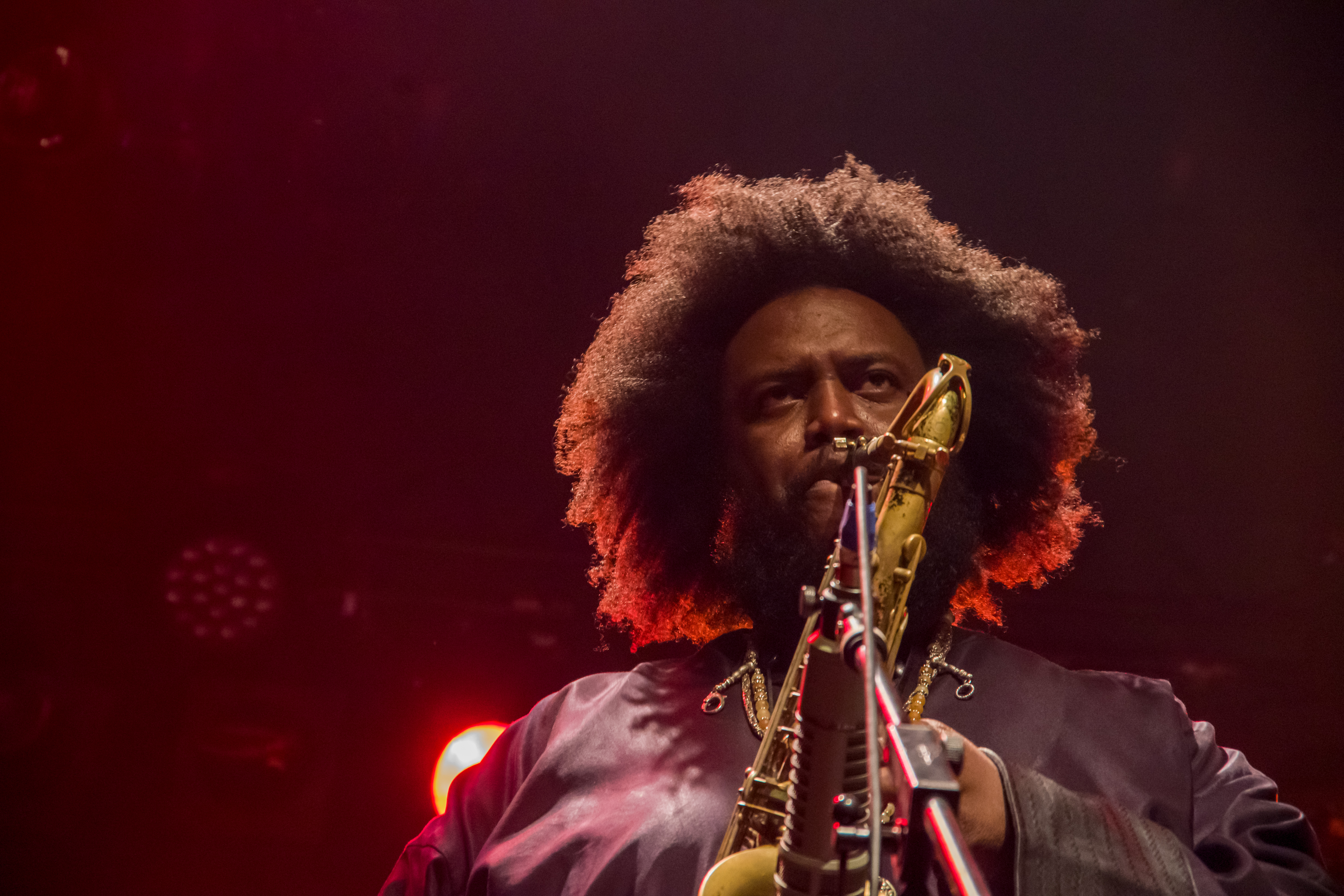
- Kamasi Washington at Zelt-Musik-Festival 2019 in Freiburg im Breisgau, Germany
- Decade: 2010s in jazz
- Music: 2019 in music
- Standards: List of jazz standards
- See also: 2018 in jazz – 2020 in jazz

This is a timeline documenting events of jazz in the year 2019.

== Events ==
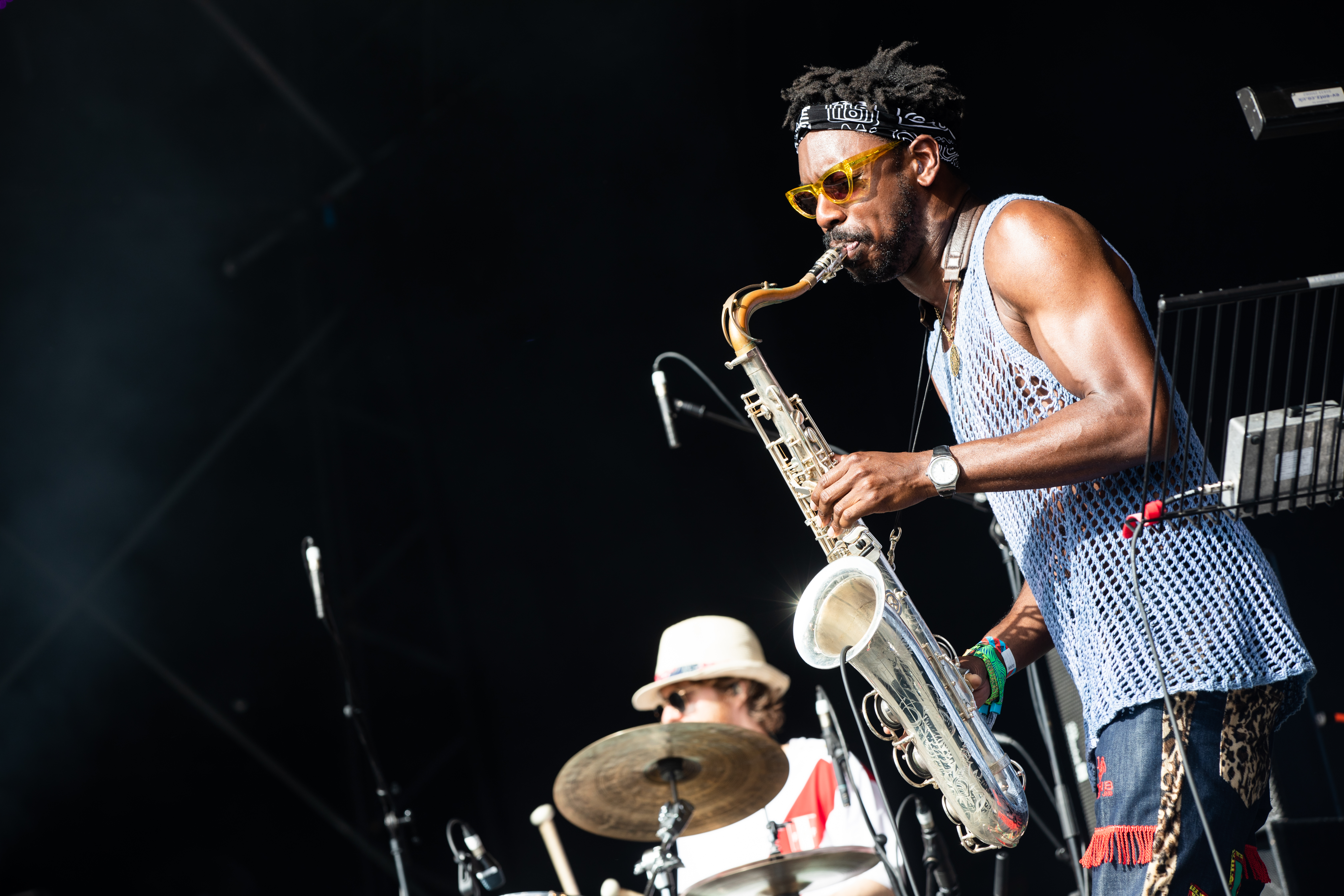
The Comet is Coming performing at the 2019 Glastonbury Festival

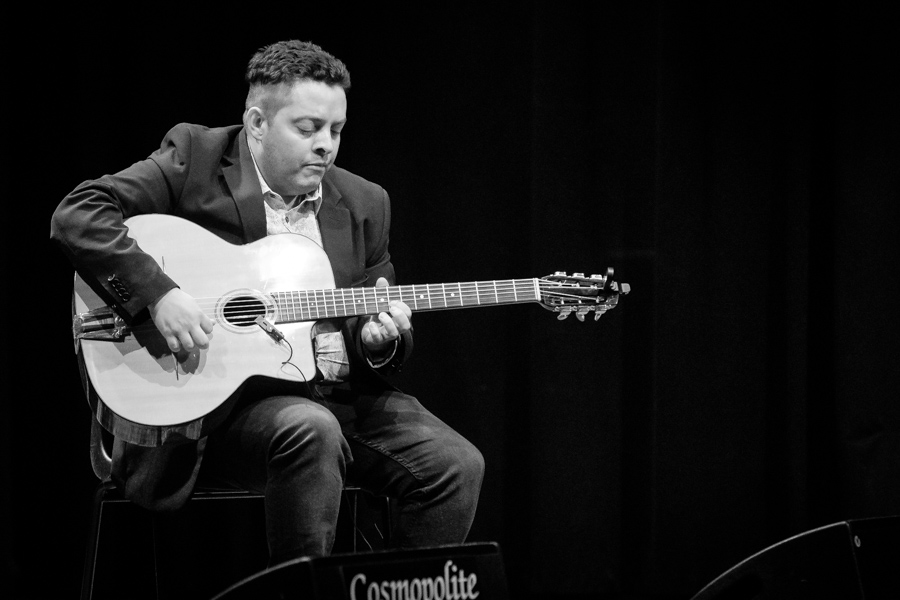
Nitcho Reinhardt 2019 at Cosmopolite, Oslo.

=== January ===
- 10 – The 18th All Ears festival starts in Oslo (January 10 – 12).
- 11 – The 5th annual Tucson Jazz Festival starts in Tucson, Arizona (January 11 – 21).
- 24 – The 38th annual Djangofestival starts on Cosmopolite in Oslo, Norway (January 24–26).
- 31
  - The 8th Bodø Jazz Open Vinterjazz starts in Bodø, Norway (January 31 – February 2).
  - The 21st Polarjazz Festival starts in Longyearbyen, Svalbard (January 31 – February 3).

=== February ===
- 14 – The 14th Ice Music Festival starts in Geilo, Norway (February 14–16).
- 26 – English saxophonist Trevor Watts celebrates his 80th birthday.
- 28 – American saxophonist Charles Gayle celebrates his 80th birthday.

=== March ===
- 1 – The 15th Jakarta International Java Jazz Festival starts in Jakarta, Indonesia (March 1 – 3).
- 6 – The 50th Turku Jazz Festival starts in Åbo, Finland (March 6 – 10).
- 16 – American violinist Jerry Goodman (Mahavishnu Orchestra) celebrates his 70th birthday.
- 22 – The Blue House Youth Jazz Festival starts in Stockholm, Sweden (March 22 – 24).
- 29 – The 20th Cape Town International Jazz Festival starts in Cape Town, South Africa (March 29 – 30).

=== April ===
- 12 – The 46th Vossajazz starts in Vossavangen, Norway (April 12 – 14).
- 24 – The 32nd April Jazz Espoo starts (April 25 – 29).
- 26 – The 8th Torino Jazz Festival starts in Turin (April 26 – May 4).
- 30 – The International Jazz Day.

=== May ===
- 3 – The Balejazz starts in Balestrand (May 3 – 5).
- 6 – The 30th MaiJazz starts in Stavanger, Norway (May 6 – 12).
- 8 – The 15th AnJazz, the Hamar Jazz Festival starts at Hamar, Norway (May 8 – 12).
- 16 – The 18th Festival Jazz à Saint-Germain-des-Prés starts in Paris, France (May 16 – 27).
- 24 – The 47th Nattjazz starts in Bergen, Norway (May 24 – June 1).

=== June ===
- 12 – The Bergenfest starts in Bergen (June 12 – 15).
- 13 – The Norwegian Wood music festival starts in Oslo (June 13 – 15).
- 26 – The Leopolis Jazz Fest (previously Alfa Jazz Fest) opens in Lviv, Ukraine (June 26–30).
- 27 – The Festival International de Jazz de Montréal opens in Montréal, Canada (June 27 - July 6).
- 28
  - The 39th Jazz à Vienne starts in Vienne, France (June 28 - July 13).
  - The 53rd Montreux Jazz Festival starts in Montreux, Switzerland (June 28 - July 13).

=== July ===
- 3 – The Kongsberg Jazzfestival opens at Kongsberg consert (August 3 – 6).
- 4 – The 23rd Skånevik Bluesfestival starts in Skånevik, Norway (July 4 – 6).
- 5
  - The Baltic Jazz Festival starts in Dalsbruk (July 5 – 7).
  - The Love Supreme Jazz Festival starts in Lewes, East Sussex (July 5 – 7).
  - The 41st Copenhagen Jazz Festival starts in Copenhagen, Denmark (July 5 – 14).
- 11 – The 18th Stavernfestivalen starts in Stavern (August 11 – 13).
- 12
  - The 44th North Sea Jazz Festival starts in The Hague, Netherlands ( July 12–14).
  - The 54th Pori Jazz Festival starts in Pori, Finland (July 12 – 20).
  - The 46th Umbria Jazz Festival starts in Perugia, Italy (July 12 – 21).
- 13 – The 31st Aarhus Jazz Festival starts in Aarhus, Denmark (July 13 – 20).
- 15 – The Moldejazz starts in Molde (August 15 – 20).
- 16
  - The 72nd Nice Jazz Festival starts in Nice, France (July 16 – 20).
  - The 43rd Jazz de Vitoria starts in Gasteiz, Spain (July 16 – 20).
- 24 – The 24th Canal Street Festival starts in Arendal (July 24 – 27).

=== August ===
- 2
  - The 63rd Newport Jazz Festival starts in Newport, Rhode Island (August 2 – 4).
  - The Nišville International Jazz Festival starts in Niš, Serbia (August 2 – 11).
- 6 – The 20th Øyafestivalen starts in Oslo, Norway (August 6 – 10).
- 8 – The 33rd Sildajazz starts in Haugesund, Norway (August 8 – 9).
- 9 – The 35th Brecon Jazz Festival starts in Brecon, Wales (August 9 – 11).
- 11 – The 34th Oslo Jazzfestival starts in Oslo, Norway (August 11 – 17).

=== September ===
- 5 – The 14th Punktfestivalen opens in Kristiansand (September 5–7).
- 27 – The 62nd Monterey Jazz Festival starts in Monterey, California (September 27 – 29).

=== October ===
- 17 – The 37th DølaJazz starts in Lillehammer (October 17 – 20).
- 24 – The 41st Guinness Cork Jazz Festival starts in Cork City, Ireland (October 24 – 28).
- 31 – The 56th JazzFest Berlin, also known as The Berlin Jazz Festival starts in Berlin (October 31 – November 3).

=== November ===
- 3 – American saxophonist and trumpeter Joe McPhee celebrates his 80th birthday.

=== December ===
- 25 – American pianist Bob James celebrates his 80th birthday.

== Albums released ==
Month	Day	Album	Artist	Label	Notes	Ref.
January	11	Heart Songs	Tommy Emmanuel & John Knowles	CGP Sounds/Thirty Tigers		
January	18	Days on Earth	Mark Lockheart	Edition		
January	18	Juni	Peter Erskine, Palle Danielsson, John Taylor	ECM		
January	25	The Expanded 1963 New York Studios Sessions	Eric Dolphy - Musical Prophet	Resonance		
January	25	Lines In The Sand	Antonio Sánchez	CAM Jazz		
January	25	Trio Tapestry	Joe Lovano	ECM	Produced by Manfred Eicher	
February	1	And Then Comes The Nigh	Mats Eilertsen, Harmen Fraanje, Thomas Strønen	ECM		
February	1	Imaginary Friends	Ralph Alessi, Ravi Coltrane, Andy Milne, Drew Gress, Mark Ferber	ECM		
February	8	Dualistic	Dualistic (Bernt Moen, Fredrik Sahlander, Tobias Solbakk)	Losen		
February	8	Tana	Sverre Gjørvad	Losen		
February	8	Æ	Anton Eger	Edition	Produced by Petter Eldh and Anton Eger, Executive producer Dave Stapleton	
February	22	Circuits	Chris Potter	Edition		
February	22	Quilter	Thomas T Dahl	Losen	Produced by Thomas T Dahl	
February	22	The Gleaners	Larry Grenadier	ECM		
March	8	Voyage	Daniel Herskedal	Edition	Produced by Daniel Herskedal, Executive producer Dave Stapleton	
March	15	Immigrance	Snarky Puppy	GroundUP		
March	22	Sounds Of 3 Edition 2	Per Mathisen feat. Ulf Wakenius and Gary Husband	Losen		
March	29	Come What May	Joshua Redman	Nonesuch		
May	17	Finding Gabriel	Brad Mehldau Trio	Nonesuch	Won Grammy Award for Best Jazz Instrumental Album	
May	24	Northbound	Eivind Austad Trio	Losen		
August	23	Love & Liberation	Jazzmeia Horn	Concord	Nominated for Grammy Award for Best Jazz Vocal Album	
August	30	Sonero: The Music of Ismael Rivera	Miguel Zenón		Nominated for Grammy Award for Best Latin Jazz Album	
October	4	Spectrum	Hiromi Uehara	Telarc		
October	11	Good Hope	Dave Holland, Chris Potter, Zakir Hussain	Edition		
October	24	Polyhymnia	Yazz Ahmed	Ropeadope Records		

== Deaths ==
=== January ===
- 5 – Alvin Fielder, American drummer (born 1935).
- 9 – Joseph Jarman, American saxophonist, Art Ensemble of Chicago (born 1937).
- 13 – Willie Murphy, American singer and pianist (born 1943).
- 16 – Chris Wilson, Australian singer and guitarist (born 1956).
- 21 – Marcel Azzola, French accordionist (born 1927).
- 23 – Oliver Mtukudzi, Zimbabwean guitarist (born 1952).
- 26 – Michel Legrand, French composer, arranger, conductor, and pianist (born 1932).

=== February ===
- 15 – Kofi Burbridge, American keyboardist and flautist, Tedeschi Trucks Band (born 1961).
- 16 – Ken Nordine, American spoken word jazz artist (born 1920).
- 17 – Ethel Ennis, American singer and pianist (born 1932).
- 28 - Ed Bickert, Canadian jazz guitarist

=== March ===
- 5 – Jacques Loussier, French jazz pianist and film score composer (born 1934)

=== December ===
- 7 – Joe McQueen, American saxophonist (born 1919).

== See also ==
- List of 2019 albums
- List of jazz festivals
- List of years in jazz
- 2010s in jazz
- 2019 in music
