= 1942 in jazz =

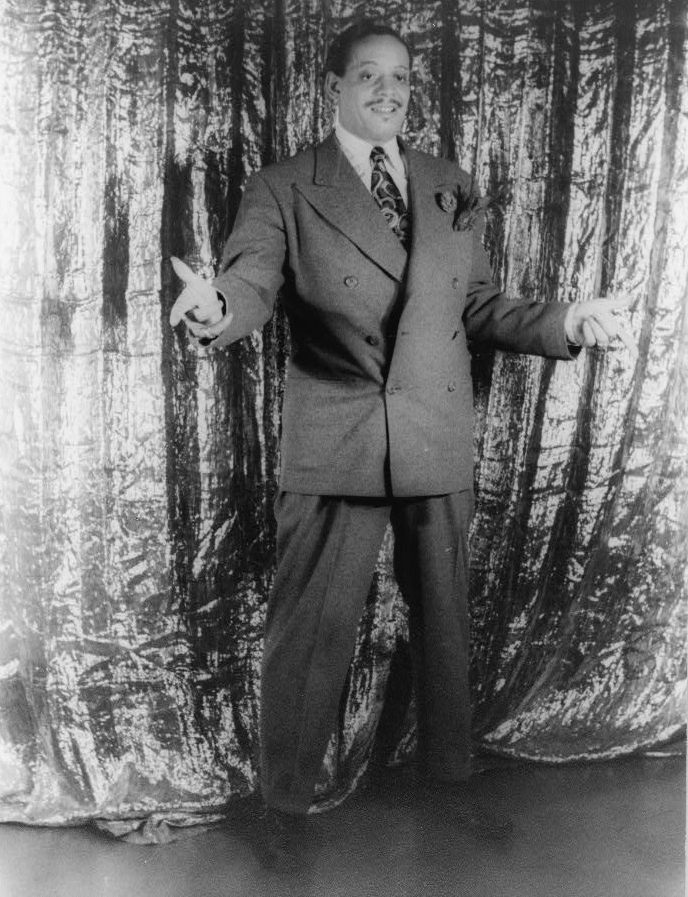
- Jazz bandleader Tiny Bradshaw (1905-1958)
- Decade: 1940s in jazz
- Music: 1942 in music
- Standards: List of 1940s jazz standards
- See also: 1941 in jazz – 1943 in jazz

This is a timeline documenting events of Jazz in the year 1942.

== Events ==
August

- The American Federation of Musicians president James C. Petrillo initiated a ban on recording, in hopes of coercing record companies into returning part of their profits to the union to be used for special concerts and projects. This forced the record companies to focus on recording singers and singing groups and reissuing previously recorded material.

October

- Sarah Vaughan was discovered at the Apollo Theater in Harlem after having won first prize at Amateur Night.
- 18 – Louis Armstrong was married to a Cotton Club dancer named Lucille Wilson. They remained married until his death.

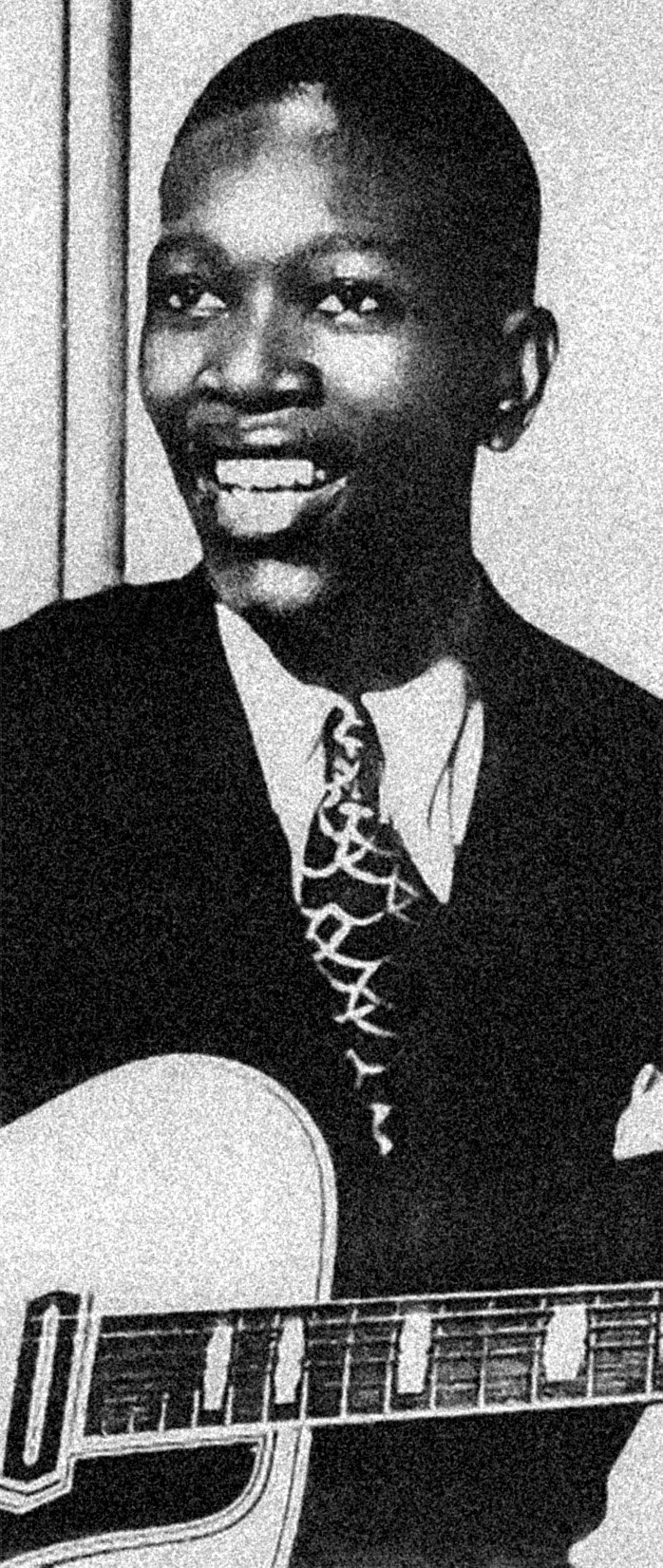
Charlie Christian July 29, 1916 – March 2, 1942), a guitarist.

== Deaths ==
January

- 1 – Jaroslav Ježek, Czech composer, pianist and conductor (born 1906).
- 12 – Willie Cornish, American trombonist (born 1875).

March

- 1 – Leo Adde, American drummer (born 1904).
- 2 – Charlie Christian, American guitarist (born 1916).

June

- 2 – Bunny Berigan, American trumpeter (born 1908).

July

- 30 – Jimmy Blanton, American upright bassist (born 1918).

== Births ==
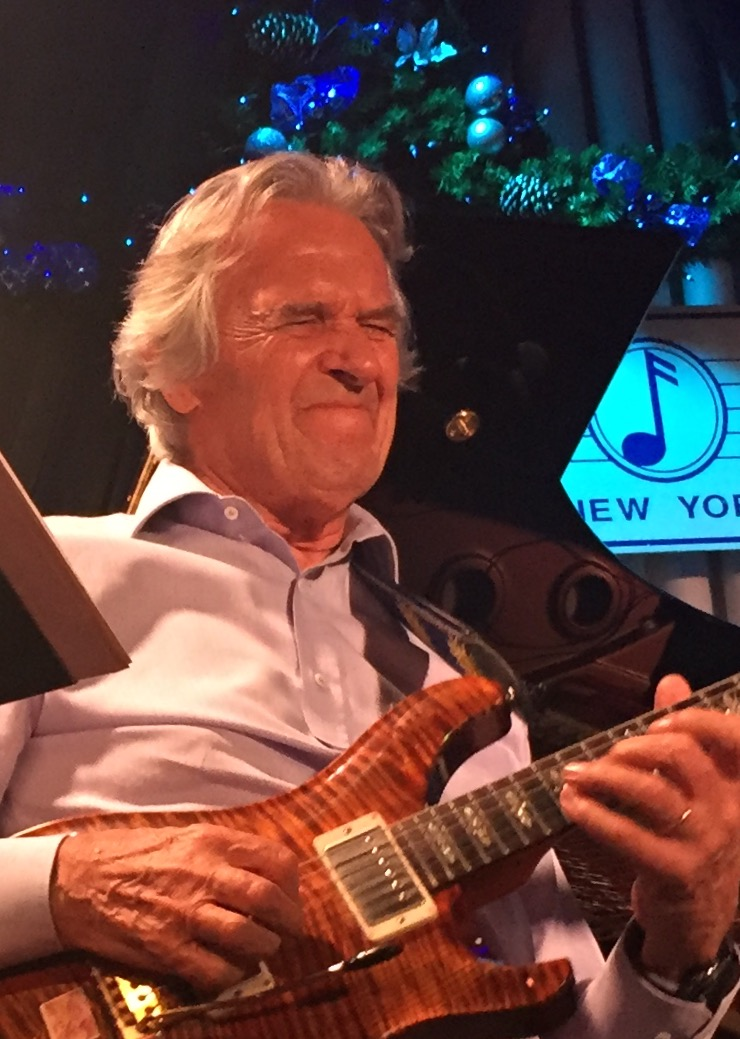
John McLaughlin Blue Note 2016.

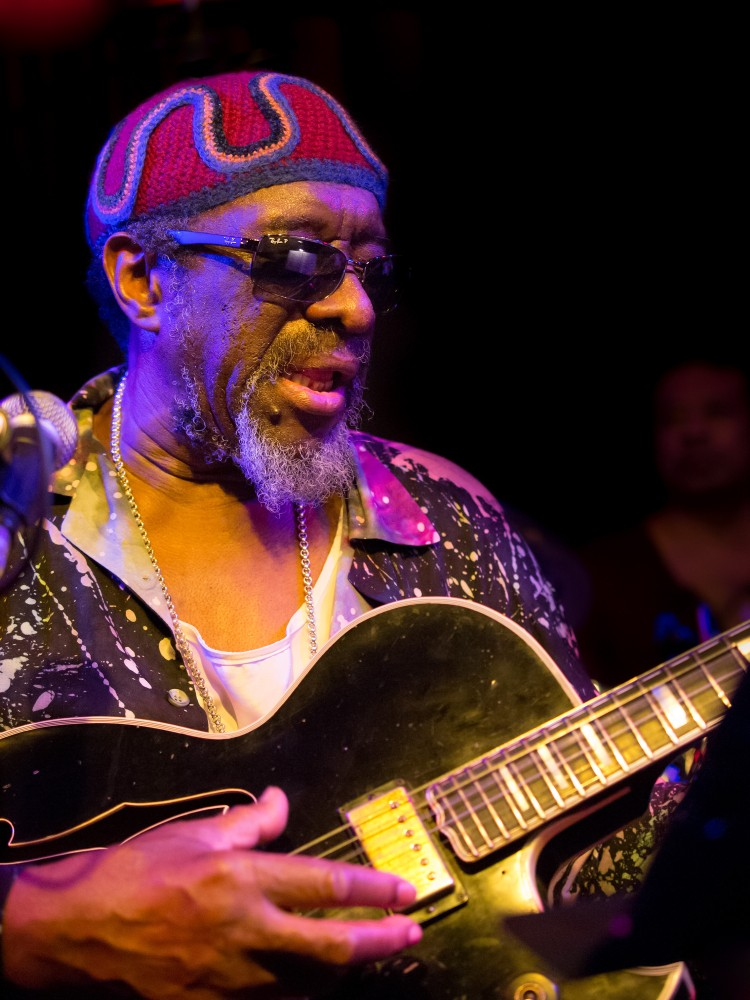
James Blood Ulmer Black Rock Experience Unterfahrt 2013.

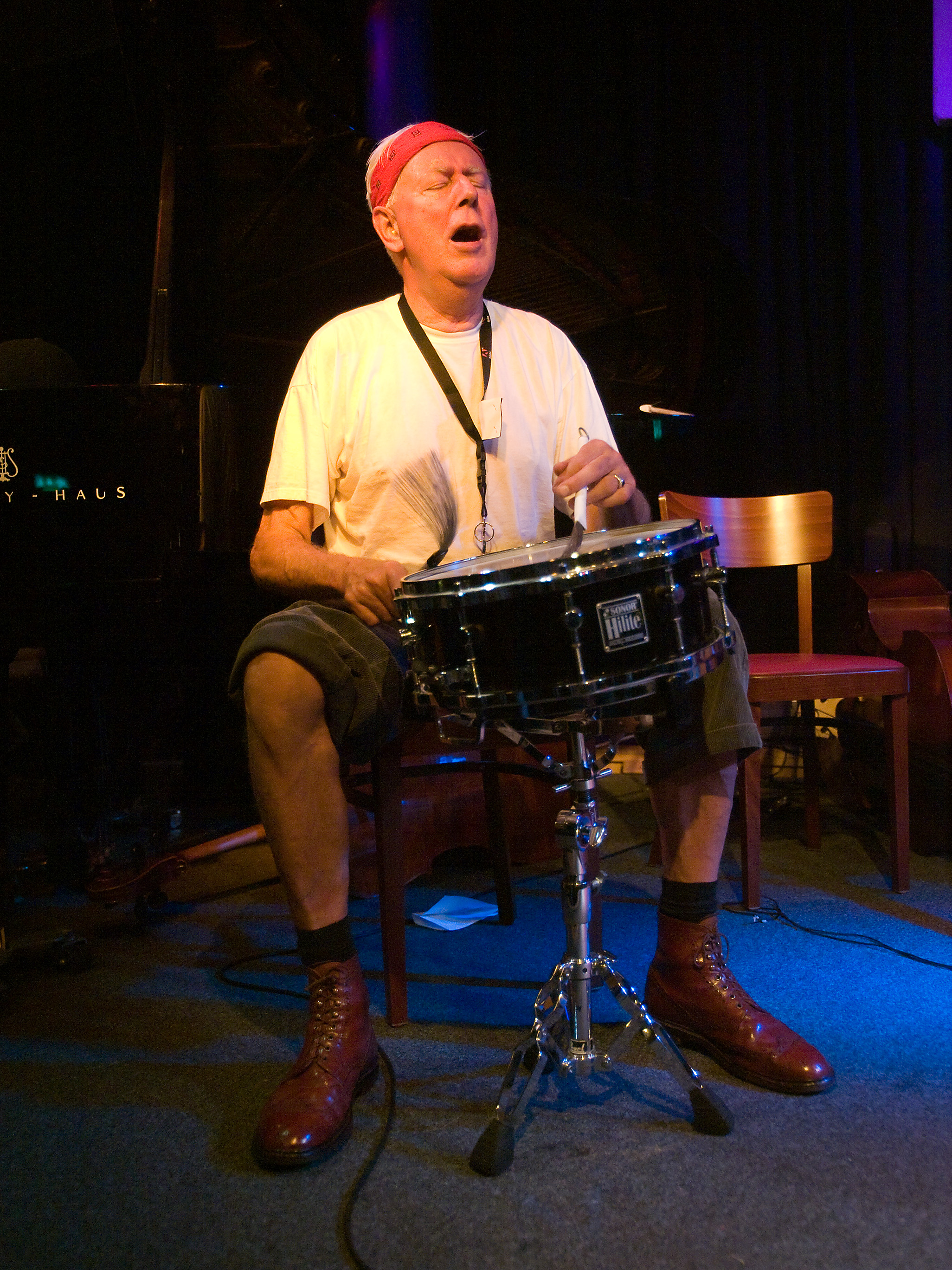
Han Bennink at Jazzclub Unterfahrt in 2010.

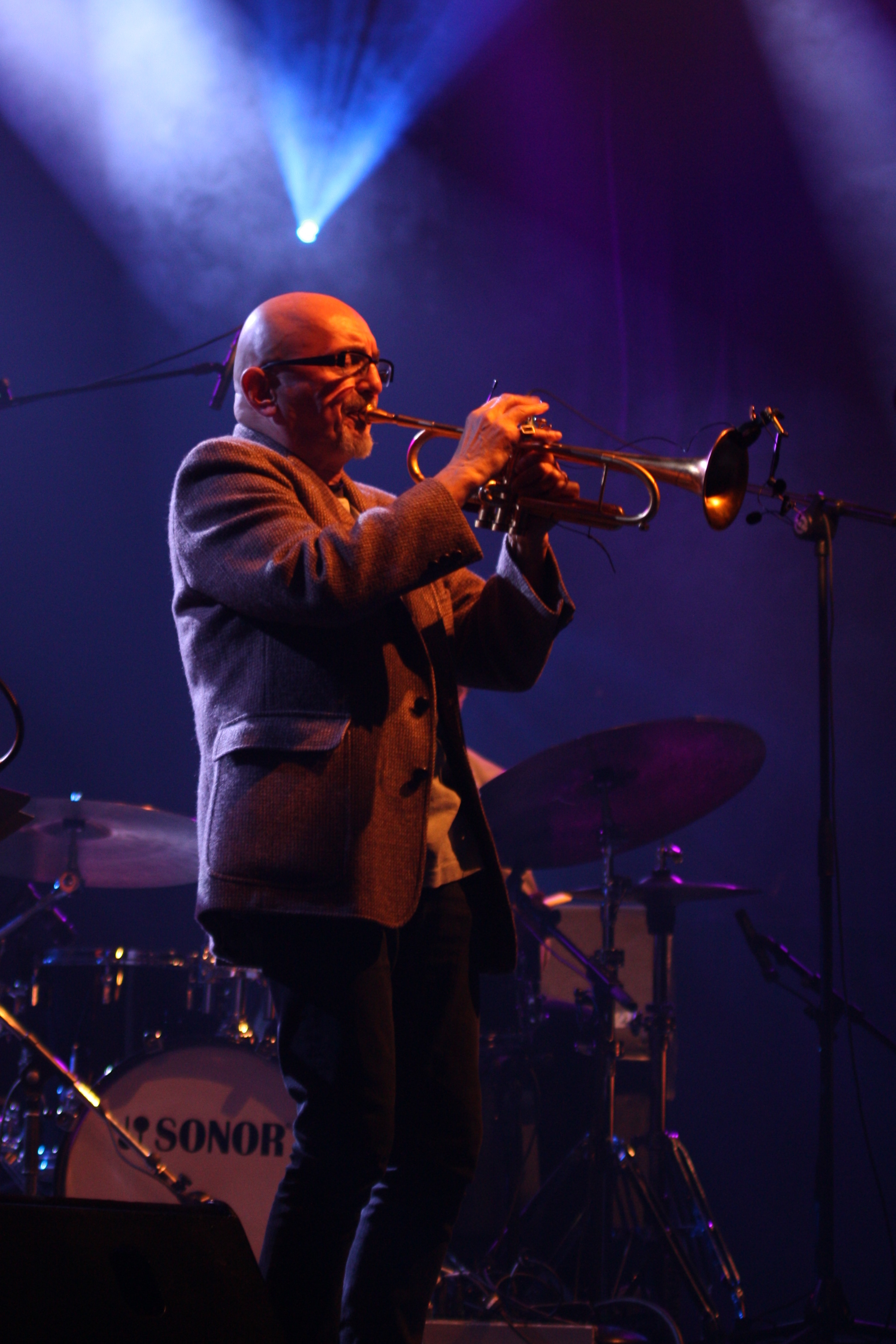
Tomasz Stańko in 2013.

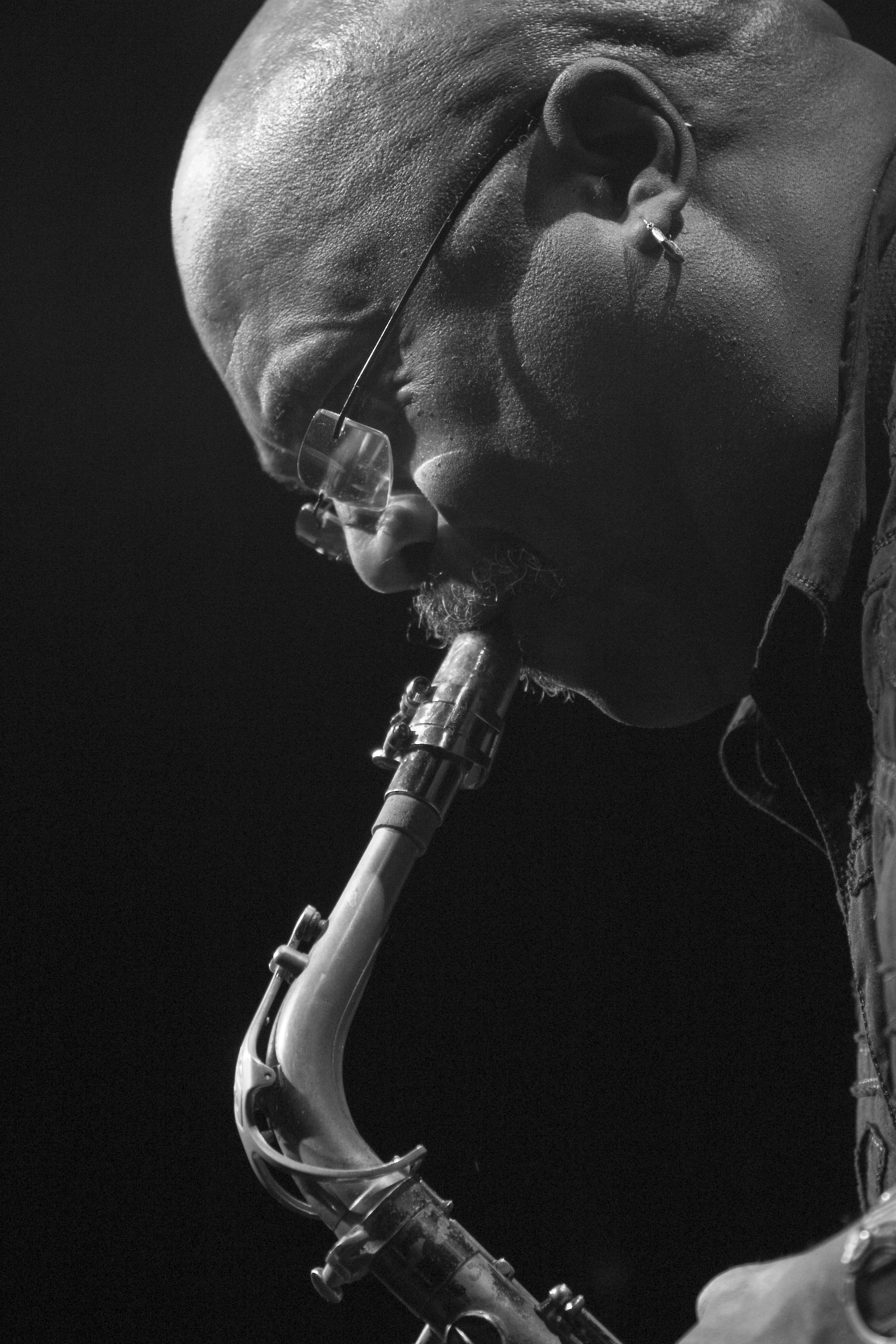
Oliver Lake in 2006.

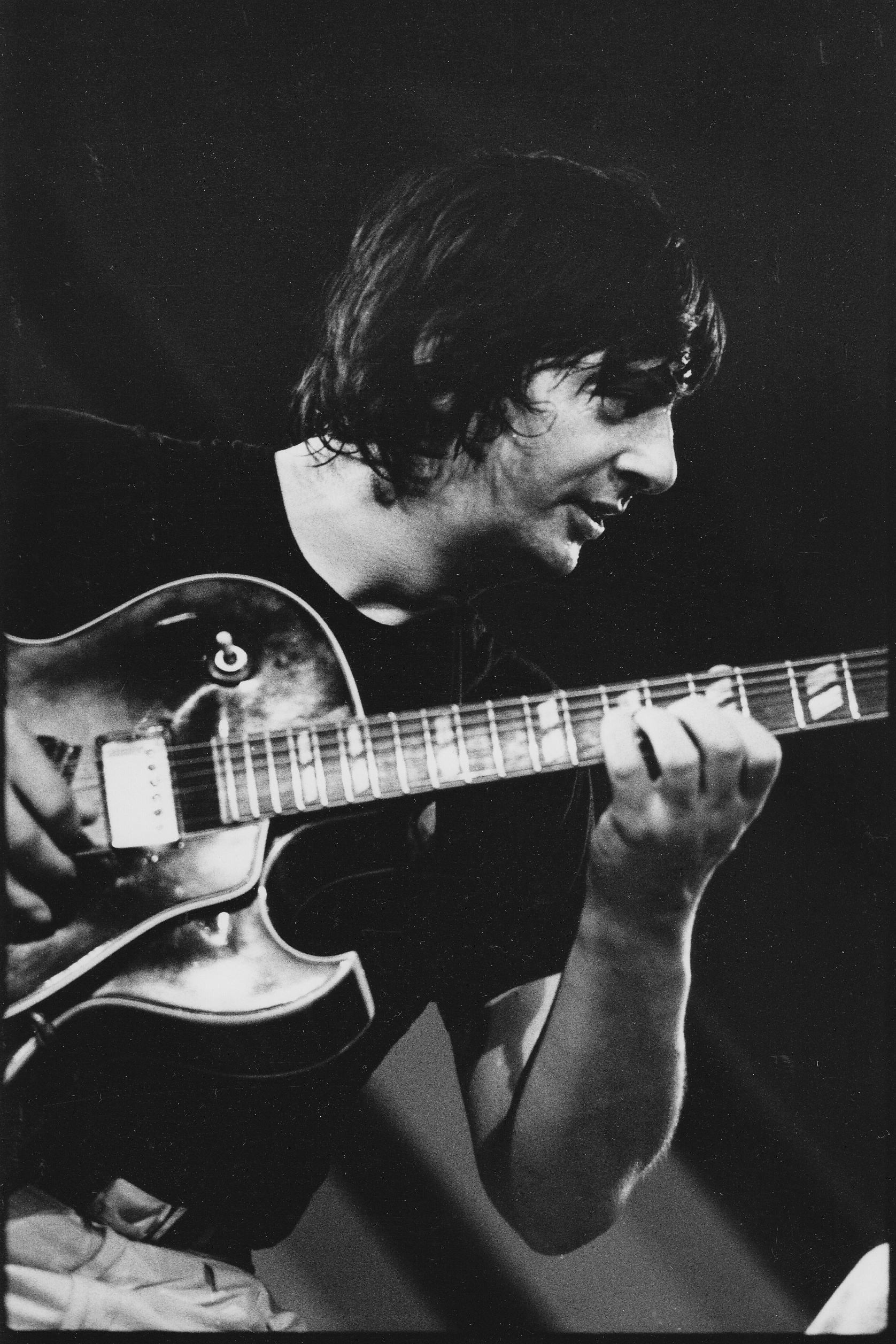
Philip Catherine in 1984.

January

- 4 – John McLaughlin, English guitarist.
- 7 – Jocelyne Jocya, American singer and songwriter (died 2003).
- 8
  - Bill Goodwin, American drummer.
  - Jon Lucien, American vocalist (died 2007).
- 19 – Nara Leão, Brazilian singer (died 1989).
- 25
  - Art Murphy, American pianist and composer (died 2006).
  - Graeme Lyall, Australian saxophonist, composer and arranger.
- 27 – Maki Asakawa, Japanese singer, lyricist, and composer (died 2010).

February

- 5 – Keith Ingham, English pianist.
- 12 – Lionel Grigson, British pianist and trumpeter (died 1994).
- 26 – Yōsuke Yamashita, Japanese pianist, composer and writer.

March

- 3
  - Lyman Woodard, American organist (died 2009).
  - Teruo Nakamura, Japanese bassist.
- 4 – Dave Matthews, American keyboardist.
- 5 – Dave Green, English upright bassist.
- 6
  - Charles Tolliver, American trumpeter and composer.
  - Flora Purim, Brazilian singer.
  - Robin Kenyatta, American alto saxophonist (died 2004).
- 21 – Amina Claudine Myers, American pianist, organist, vocalist, and composer.
- 25 – Aretha Franklin, American singer and songwriter (died 2018).

April

- 2 – Leon Russell, American musician and songwriter (died 2016).
- 13 – Rusty Jones, American drummer (died 2015).
- 17
  - Buster Williams, American bassist.
  - Han Bennink, Dutch drummer and multi-instrumentalist.
- 21 – Alan Skidmore, English tenor saxophonist.
- 29 – Sammy Rimington, English reedist.

May

- 6 – David Friesen, American bassist.
- 13 – Jim Douglas, Scottish guitarist.
- 20 – Dan Jacobs, American trumpeter and flugelhornist.
- 23 – Randolph Colville, Scottish clarinettist and saxophonist (died 2004).
- 26 – Geoff Bull, Australian trumpeter and bandleader.

June

- 3 – Curtis Mayfield, American singer-songwriter, guitarist, record producer (died 1999).
- 14 – Peter Lemer, English pianist and keyboarder, Spontaneous Music Ensemble.
- 17 – Torgrim Sollid, Norwegian trumpeter and drummer.
- 21 – Ditlef Eckhoff, Norwegian trumpeter.
- 25 – Joe Chambers, American drummer, pianist, vibraphonist, and composer.

July

- 2 – Mike Abene, American pianist.
- 3 – Lonnie Smith, American Hammond B3 organist (died 2021).
- 11 – Tomasz Stańko, Polish trumpeter and composer (died 2018).
- 12 – Richard Stoltzman, American clarinetist.

August

- 2 – Carl Saunders, American trumpeter, composer and educator (died 2023).
- 6 – Byard Lancaster, American saxophonist and flutist (died 2012).
- 9 – Jack DeJohnette, American drummer, pianist, and composer (died 2025).
- 16 – Marc Moulin, Belgian musician and journalist (died 2008).
- 23
  - Letta Mbulu, South African singer.
  - Walter Payton, American bassist and sousaphonist (died 2010).
- 25
  - Michel Donato, Canadian upright bassist and composer.
  - Terje Fjærn, Norwegian orchestra conductor ("La det swinge") (died 2016).

September

- 6
  - Andrew White, American saxophonist (died 2020).
  - Dave Bargeron, American trombonist and tubist.
- 12 – Jane Getz, American pianist.
- 14 – Oliver Lake, American saxophonist and composer.
- 22 – Marlena Shaw, American singer.
- 23 – Jeremy Steig, American flautist (died 2016).
- 25 – John Taylor, British pianist (died 2015).
- 28 – Tim Maia, Brazilian musician and songwriter (died 1998).
- 29 – Jean-Luc Ponty, French violinist and composer.
- 30 – Frankie Lymon, American singer (died 1968).

October

- 1 – Wendell Harrison, American clarinetist, tenor saxophonist.
- 5 – Donald Ayler, American trumpeter (died 2007).
- 10 – Cecil Bridgewater, American trumpeter.
- 25 – Terumasa Hino, Japanese trumpeter.
- 26 – Ranee Lee, American vocalist.
- 27 – Philip Catherine, Belgian guitarist and composer.

November

- 9 – Bill Elgart, American drummer.
- 10 – Zdzisław Piernik, Polish tubist.
- 23 – Jiří Stivín, Czech flautist and composer.

December

- 19 – Cornell Dupree, American guitarist (died 2011).
- 26 – Doug Hammond, American drummer, composer, and poet.
- 31 – Andy Summers, English guitarist, composer, and photographer.

Unknown date

- Carlton Kitto, Indian guitarist (died 2016).
- Pocho Lapouble, Argentine drummer, composer and arranger (died 2009).
- Richard Badendyck, Norwegian singer and pianist.

== See also ==
- 1940s in jazz
- List of years in jazz
- 1942 in music

== Bibliography ==
- The New Real Book, Volume I. Sher Music. 1988. ISBN 0-9614701-4-3.
- The New Real Book, Volume II. Sher Music. 1991. ISBN 0-9614701-7-8.
- The New Real Book, Volume III. Sher Music. 1995. ISBN 1-883217-30-X.
- The Real Book, Volume I (6th ed.). Hal Leonard. 2004. ISBN 0-634-06038-4.
- The Real Book, Volume II (2nd ed.). Hal Leonard. 2007. ISBN 978-1-4234-2452-9.
- The Real Book, Volume III (2nd ed.). Hal Leonard. 2006. ISBN 0-634-06136-4.
- The Real Jazz Book. Warner Bros. ISBN 978-91-85041-36-7.
- The Real Vocal Book, Volume I. Hal Leonard. 2006. ISBN 0-634-06080-5.
