= 1932 in jazz =

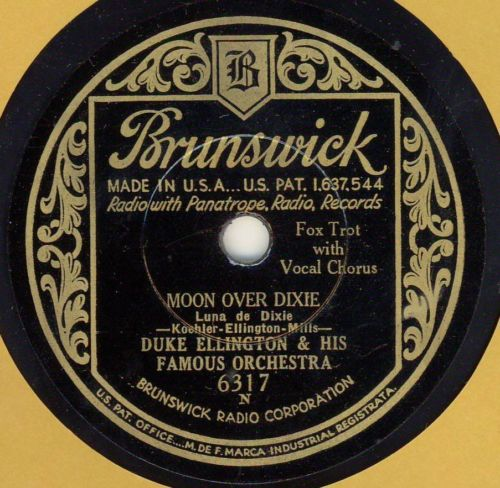
- Duke Ellington Orchestra: Moon Over Dixie – 2 February 1932 (Brunswick Records)
- Decade: 1930s in jazz
- Music: 1932 in music
- Standards: List of 1930s jazz standards
- See also: 1931 in jazz – 1933 in jazz

The following events related to jazz occurred in the year 1932.

== Events ==
February

- 2 – The Duke Ellington Orchestra released the album Moon Over Dixie on the label Brunswick Records.

== Deaths ==
March

- 1 – Frank Teschemacher, American jazz clarinetist and alto-saxophonist (born 1906).

May

- 20 – James "Bubber" Miley, trumpeter and cornet player, specializing in the use of the plunger mute (born 1903).

Unknown date

- Virginia Liston, American classic female blues and jazz singer (born 1890).

== Births ==
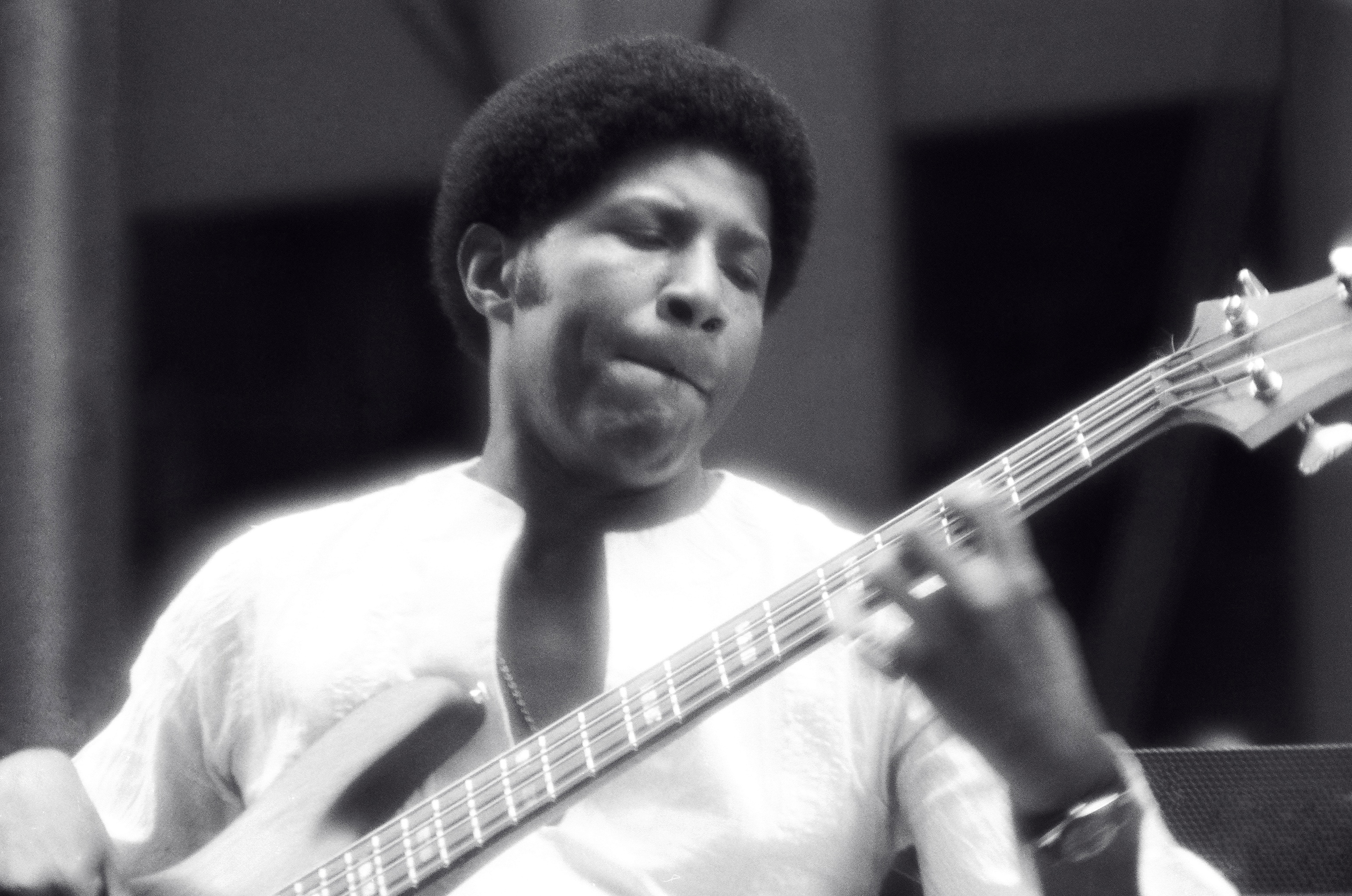
Bob Cranshaw July 6, 1976

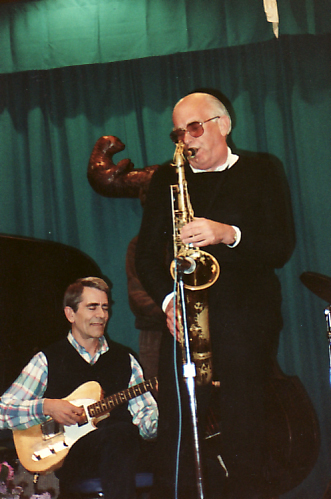
Ed Bickert and Fraser MacPherson, Otter Crest, Oregon. May 1989.

January

- 1 – Jack Reilly, American pianist (died 2018).
- 6 – John Burch, English pianist, composer, and bandleader (died 2006).
- 8 – Dick Charlesworth, English clarinettist and saxophonist (died 2008).
- 11 – János Gonda, Hungarian pianist (died 2021).
- 12 – Hadley Caliman, American saxophone and flute player (died 2010).
- 14 – Grady Tate, American drummer and singer (died 2017).
- 18 – Irene Kral, American singer (died 1978).
- 22 – Teddy Smith, American upright bassist (died 1979).
- 31 – Ottilie Patterson, Northern Irish singer (died 2011).

February

- 10
  - Roland Hanna, American jazz pianist, composer and teacher (died 2002).
  - Walter Perkins, American drummer (died 2004).
- 21 – Eddie Higgins, American pianist and composer (died 2009).
- 22 – Whitey Mitchell, American bassist (died 2009).
- 24 – Michel Legrand, French composer, arranger, conductor, and pianist (died 2019).
- 25 – Åke Persson, Swedish trombonist (died 1975).
- 28 – Don Francks, Canadian actor and musician (died 2016).

March

- 4 – Miriam Makeba, South African singer (died 2008).
- 9 – Keely Smith, American singer (died 2017).
- 10 – Shelley Moore, English-born American singer (died 2016).
- 11
  - Atle Hammer, Norwegian trumpeter (died 2017).
  - Leroy Jenkins, American composer and violinist (died 2007).
- 14 – Mark Murphy, American singer (died 2015).
- 21 – Masaru Imada, Japanese pianist and composer.
- 22 – Leo Welch, American guitarist, singer, and songwriter (died 2017).
- 23 – Al Aarons, American trumpeter (died 2015).
- 24 – Dave MacKay, American pianist and singer (died 2020).

April

- 7 – Rauno Lehtinen, Finnish conductor and composer (died 2006).
- 21 – Slide Hampton, American trombonist, composer and arranger (died 2021).
- 25 – Willis Jackson, American tenor saxophonist (died 1987).
- 29 – Andy Simpkins, American bassist (died 1999).

May

- 8 – Robin Douglas-Home, Scottish pianist and author (died 1968).
- 12 – Walter Wanderley, American organist andpianist (died 1986).
- 13 – Harold Rubin, South African-Israeli visual artist and clarinettist (died 2020).
- 15 – John Barnes, English saxophonist and clarinetist.
- 17 – David Izenzon, American upright bassist (died 1979).
- 20 – Bob Florence, American arranger and pianist (died 2008).
- 23 – Les Spann, American guitarist and flautist (died 1989).
- 29 – Alan Shorter, American trumpeter and flugelhornist (died 1988).
- 31 – Ed Lincoln, Brazilian musician and composer (died 2012).

June

- 2 – Akitoshi Igarashi, Japanese saxophonist.
- 4 – Oliver Nelson, American saxophonist and clarinetist (died 1975).
- 5 – Pete Jolly, American pianist and accordionist (died 2004).
- 7 – Tina Brooks, American tenor saxophonist and composer (died 1974).
- 14 – Coleridge-Taylor Perkinson, American composer (died 2004).
- 21
  - Jamil Nasser, American bassist and tubist (died 2010).
  - Lalo Schifrin, Argentine pianist, composer, arranger and conductor.

July

- 6 – Don Wilkerson, American tenor saxophonist (died 1986).
- 7 – Joe Zawinul, Austrian-American keyboardist and composer (died 2007).
- 16 – John Chilton, British trumpeter and jazz writer (died 2016).

August

- 6 – Dorothy Ashby, American harpist and composer (died 1986).
- 16 – Shoji Suzuki, Japanese clarinetist (died 1995).
- 17 – Duke Pearson, American pianist and composer (died 1980).
- 29
  - Ed Bickert, Canadian guitarist (died 2019).
  - Jerry Dodgion, American saxophonist and flautist (died 2023).

September

- 2
  - Emil Richards, American vibraphonist percussionist (died 2019).
  - Walter Davis Jr., American pianist (died 1990).
- 3 – Mickey Roker, American drummer (died 2017).
- 8 – Bobby Cole, American singer and pianist (died 1996).
- 11 – Ian Hamer, British trumpeter (died 2006).
- 13 – Bengt Hallberg, Swedish jazz pianist (died 2013).
- 19 – Lol Coxhill, English saxophonist (died 2012).

October

- 13 – Johnny Lytle, American drummer and vibraphonist (died 1995).
- 14 – Earl Gill, Irish trumpeter and bandleader (died 2014).
- 16 – Ben Aronov, American pianist (died 2015).

November

- 7 – Alvin Batiste, American clarinetist (died 2007).
- 10 – Paul Bley, American pianist (died 2016).
- 11 – Al Levitt, American drummer (died 1994).
- 26 – Kiane Zawadi, American trombone and euphonium player.
- 28
  - Ethel Ennis, American singer and pianist (died 2019).
  - Gato Barbieri, Argentine saxophonist (died 2016).

December

- 2 – Gene Russell, American keyboardist (died 1981).
- 3
  - Bob Cranshaw, American bassist (died 2016).
  - Webster Young, American trumpeter and cornetist (died 2003).
- 9 – Donald Byrd, American trumpeter (died 2013).
- 15 – Curtis Fuller, American trombonist (died 2021).
- 17 – Sonny Red, American alto saxophonist (died 1981).
- 22 – Masayuki Takayanagi, Japanese guitarist (died 1991).
