= Cecil Irwin (musician) =

American jazz musician

Cecil Irwin (December 7, 1902 – May 3, 1935) was an American jazz reed player and arranger.

Irwin played early in his career with Carroll Dickerson, Erskine Tate, and Junie Cobb before joining Earl Hines's band as a saxophonist and arranger. He worked for several years with Hines in a variety of ensembles, recording with him extensively. He also played during this time as a sideman with Johnny Dodds, Jabbo Smith, King Oliver, and Joe Venuti. In 1935 he was killed in a car crash while on tour in Des Moines, Iowa.
