= 1936 in jazz =

- Decade: 1930s in jazz
- Music: 1936 in music
- Standards: List of 1930s jazz standards
- See also: 1935 in jazz – 1937 in jazz

This is a timeline documenting events of Jazz in the year 1936.

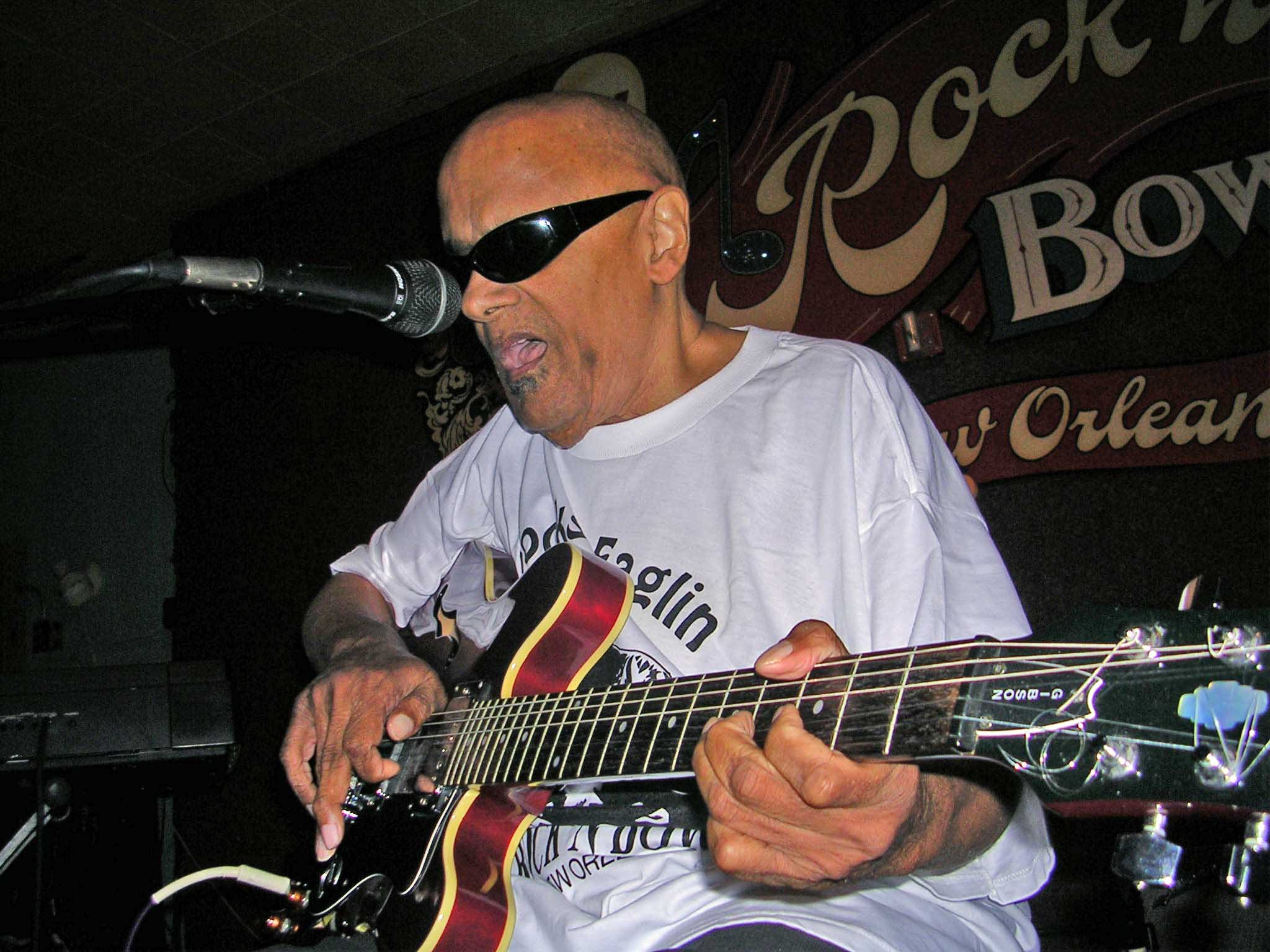
Snooks Eaglin at Rock N' Bowl, New Orleans, LA, 2006

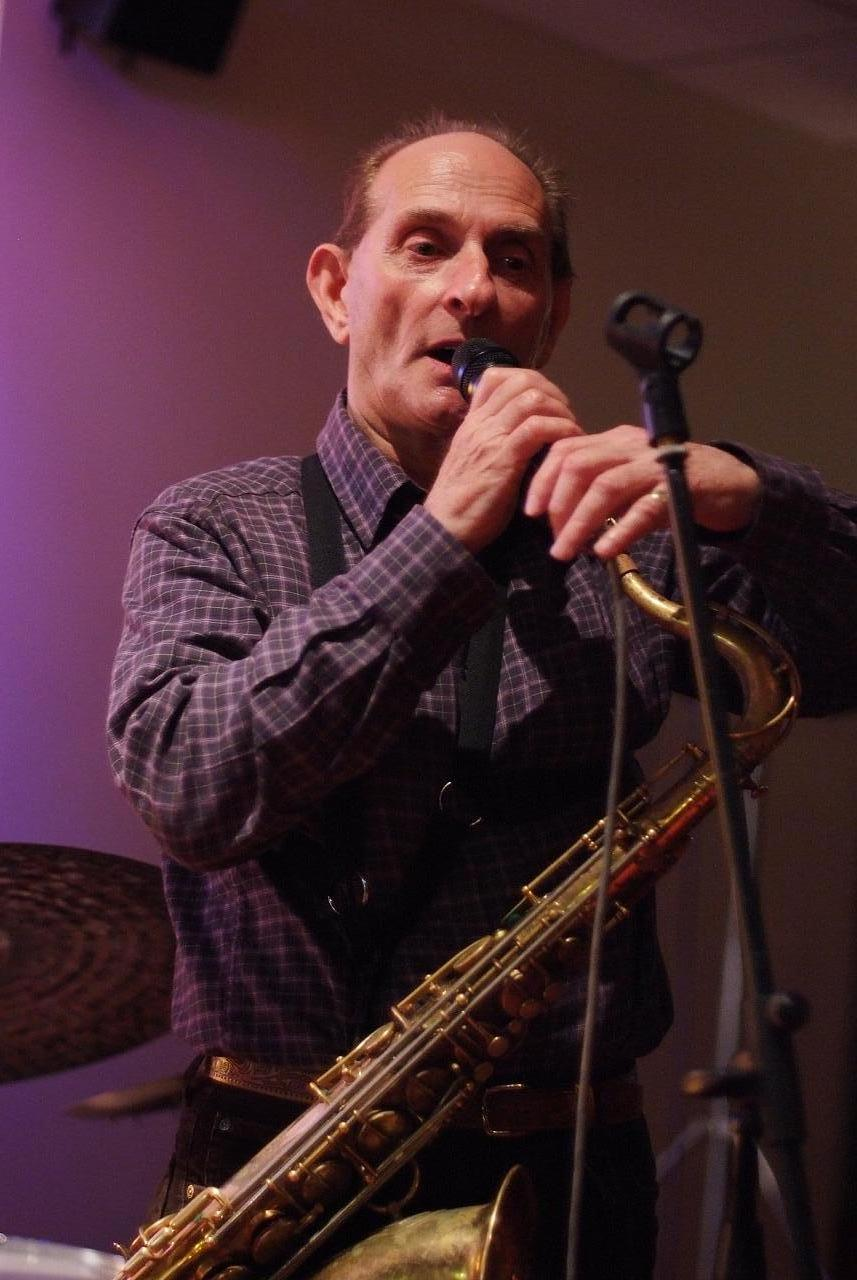
Saxophonist Bobby Wellins in 2008

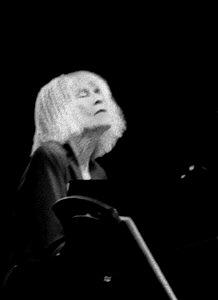
Carla Bley – The lost chords find Paolo Fresu in Monaco, 2007

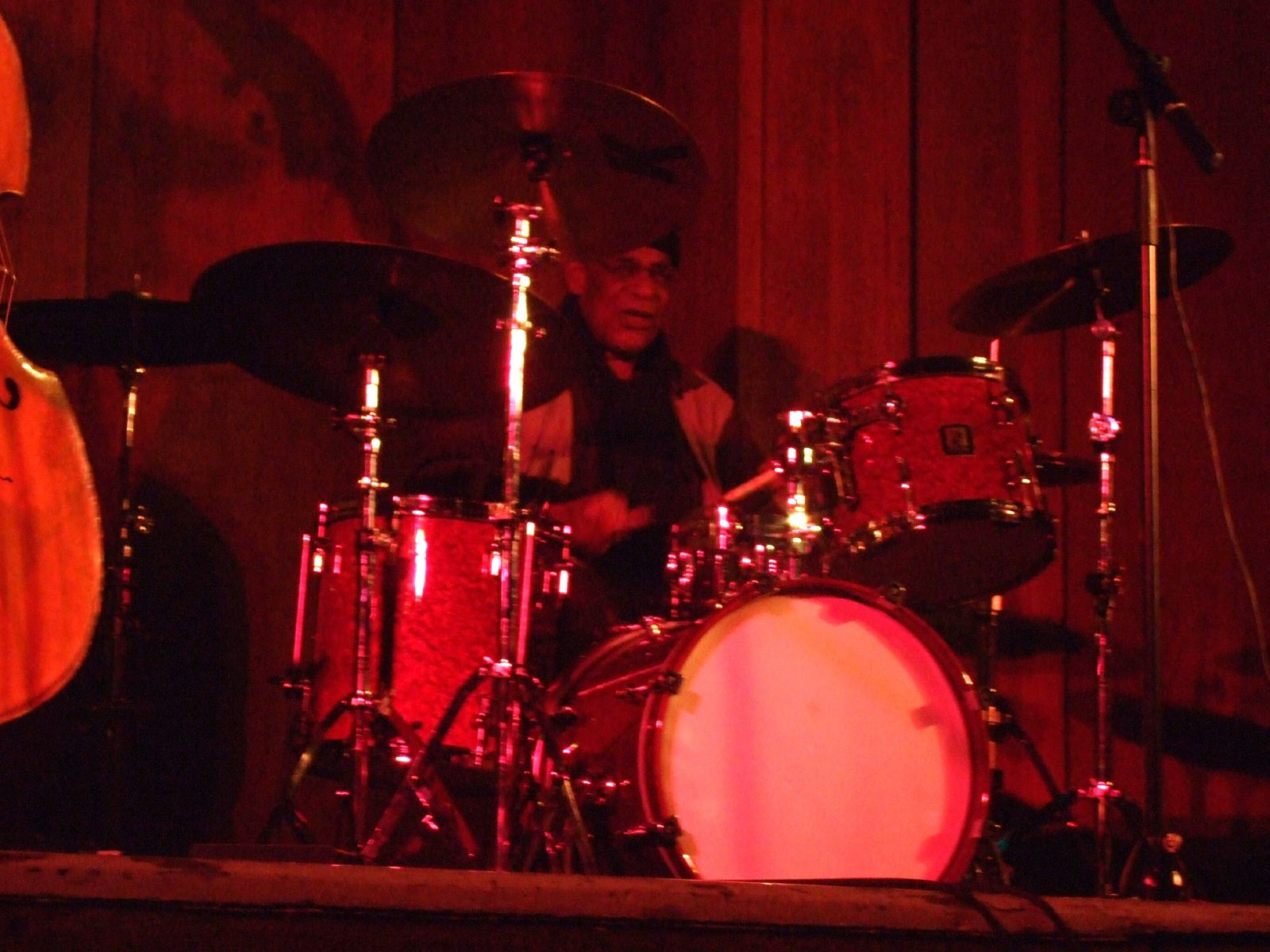
Sunny Murray 2008

A book called Bud not Buddy is a great recourse for this topic.

== Events ==
- The Duke Ellington Band makes the classic recording of Caravan.

== Deaths ==
June

- 27 – Mike Bernard, ragtime pianist (born 1875).

August

- 5 – Mitja Nikisch, German pianist and band leader (born 1899).

Unknown date

- Sam Morgan, New Orleans jazz trumpet player and bandleader (born 1895).

== Births ==
January

- 1 – Sonny Greenwich, Canadian guitarist.
- 3 – Joe Haider, German pianist.
- 7 – Eldee Young, American upright bass and cello player (died 2007).
- 19 – Hod O'Brien, American pianist (died 2016).
- 20 – Erwin Helfer, American pianist.
- 21 – Snooks Eaglin, American guitarist and singer (died 2009).
- 24 – Bobby Wellins, Scottish tenor saxophonist (died 2016).
- 31 – Garnett Brown, American trombonist (died 2021).

February

- 4 – Claude Nobs, Swiss founder and general manager of the Montreux Jazz Festival (died 2013).
- 5 – June Tyson, American singer (died 1992).
- 13 – Takashi Furuya, Japanese saxophonist and vocalist (died 2020).
- 26 – Colin Purbrook, English pianist, upright bassist, and trumpeter (died 1999).

March

- 2 – Buell Neidlinger, American upright bassist and cellist (died 2018).
- 4 – Eric Allandale, Dominican-English trombonist, songwriter, and bandleader (died 2001).
- 8 – Gábor Szabó, Hungarian guitarist (died 1982).
- 19 – Amancio D'Silva, Indian guitarist and composer (died 1996).
- 20 – Harold Mabern, American pianist and composer (died 2019).
- 21
  - Brian Dee, British pianist.
  - Mike Westbrook, English pianist and composer.
- 24 – Kalaparusha Maurice McIntyre, American tenor saxophonist (died 2013).
- 25 – Larry Gales, American upright bassist (died 1996).
- 27 – Jan Ptaszyn Wróblewski, Polish saxophonist, composer, and arranger.

April

- 3
  - Harold Vick, American saxophonist and flautist (died 1987).
  - Jimmy McGriff, American organist (died 2008).
  - Luiz Eça, Brazilian pianist (died 1992).
  - Scott LaFaro, American upright bassist (died 1961).
- 6 – Manfred Schoof, German trumpeter.
- 13 – Stan Robinson, English tenor saxophonist (died 2017).
- 20
  - Beaver Harris, American drummer (died 1991).
  - Billy James, American drummer (died 2009).
- 22 – Don Menza, American saxophonist, arranger, and composer.
- '28 – John Tchicai, Danish saxophonist (died 2012).

May

- 11 – Carla Bley, American composer, pianist, organist and bandleader (died 2023).
- 12 – Klaus Doldinger, German saxophonist.
- 13 – Manfredo Fest, Brazilian pianist and keyboardist (died 1999).
- 14 – Bobby Darin, American singer (died 1973).
- 20 – Rufus Harley, American saxophonist (died 2006).
- 26 – Charles Turner, American trumpeter (died 2006).

June

- 4 – Alan Branscombe, English pianist, vibraphonist, and alto saxophonist (died 1986).
- 6 – Maysa Matarazzo, Brazilian singer (died 1977).
- 12 – Marcus Belgrave, American trumpet player (died 2015).
- 14 – Wilson das Neves, Brazilian bossa nova singer and percussionist (died 2017).
- 15 – Jan Byrczek, Polish upright bassist, jazz critic, and jazz magazine editor (died 2019).
- 16 – Lin Halliday, American saxophonist (died 2000).
- 22 – Hermeto Pascoal, Brazilian flautist, composer, and multi-instrumentalist.
- 30 – Dave Van Ronk, American singer (died 2002).

July

- 3 – Corky Hale, American harpist, pianist, flautist, and singer.
- 5 – Tommy LiPuma, American music producer (died 2017).
- 6 – Chris White, American upright bassist (died 2014).
- 13 – Albert Ayler, American saxophonist, singer and composer (died 1970).
- 17 – Nick Brignola, American baritone saxophonist (died 2002).
- 19 – Carmell Jones, American trumpet player (died 1996).
- 22 – Don Patterson, American organist (died 1988).
- 28 – Jim Galloway, Scottish clarinetist and saxophonist (died 2014).

August

- 3 – Jack Wilson, American pianist and composer (died 2007).
- 6 – Joe Diorio, American guitarist (died 2022).
- 10 – Chuck Israels, American composer, arranger, and upright bassist.
- 22 – Lex Humphries, American drummer (died 1994).

September

- 6 – Clifford Thornton, American trumpeter and trombonist (died 1989).
- 7 - George Cassidy, Northern Irish saxophonist, music teacher to Van Morrison (died 2023).
- 17 – Rolv Wesenlund, Norwegian comedian, singer, clarinetist, and saxophonist (died 2013).
- 21 – Sunny Murray, American drummer (died 2017).
- 27 – Lars Erstrand, Swedish vibraphonist (died 2009).
- 28 – Emmett Chapman, American guitar and Chapman Stick player (died 2021).

October

- 7 – Sonny Bravo, Afro-Cuban pianist.
- 11 – Billy Higgins, American drummer (died 2001).
- 12 – Melvin Rhyne, American organist (died 2013).
- 13
  - Shirley Bunnie Foy, American singer, songwriter, and percussionist (died 2016).
  - Tom Vaughn, American pianist (died 2011).
- 17 – Sathima Bea Benjamin, South African vocalist (died 2013).
- 18 – J. C. Moses, American drummer (died 1977).
- 21 – Lyn Cornell, English singer, The Vernons Girls.
- 25 – Alfredo Rodríguez, Cuban pianist (died 2005).

November

- 18 – Don Cherry, American trumpeter (died 1995).
- 28 – Roy McCurdy, American drummer.

December

- 6 – Bill Ashton, British saxophonist and composer.
- 7
  - Arthur Jenkins, American keyboardist and percussionist (died 2009).
  - Sonny Phillips, American keyboardist.
- 10
  - John Boudreaux, American drummer (died 2017).
  - Martha Mier, American pianist, piano teacher, and composer.
- 15 – Eddie Palmieri, Puerto Rican-American pianist and bandleader.
- 17 – Tommy Banks, Canadian pianist (died 2018).
- 23 – Muhammad Ali, American drummer.
- 24 – Chris McGregor, South African pianist, bandleader and composer (died 1990).
- 27 – Mike Barone, American trombonist and big band leader.

Unknown date

- Byrdie Green, American singer (died 2008).
- Cynthia Crane, American singer.
- Salah Ragab, Egyptian drummer and called the founder Egyptian jazz (died 2008).
