= 1944 in jazz =

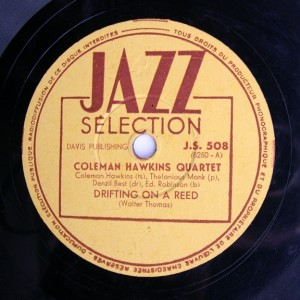
- Coleman Hawkins/Thelonious Monk - drifting on a reed 1944
- Decade: 1940s in jazz
- Music: 1944 in music
- Standards: List of 1940s jazz standards
- See also: 1943 in jazz – 1945 in jazz

This is a timeline documenting events of jazz in the year 1944.

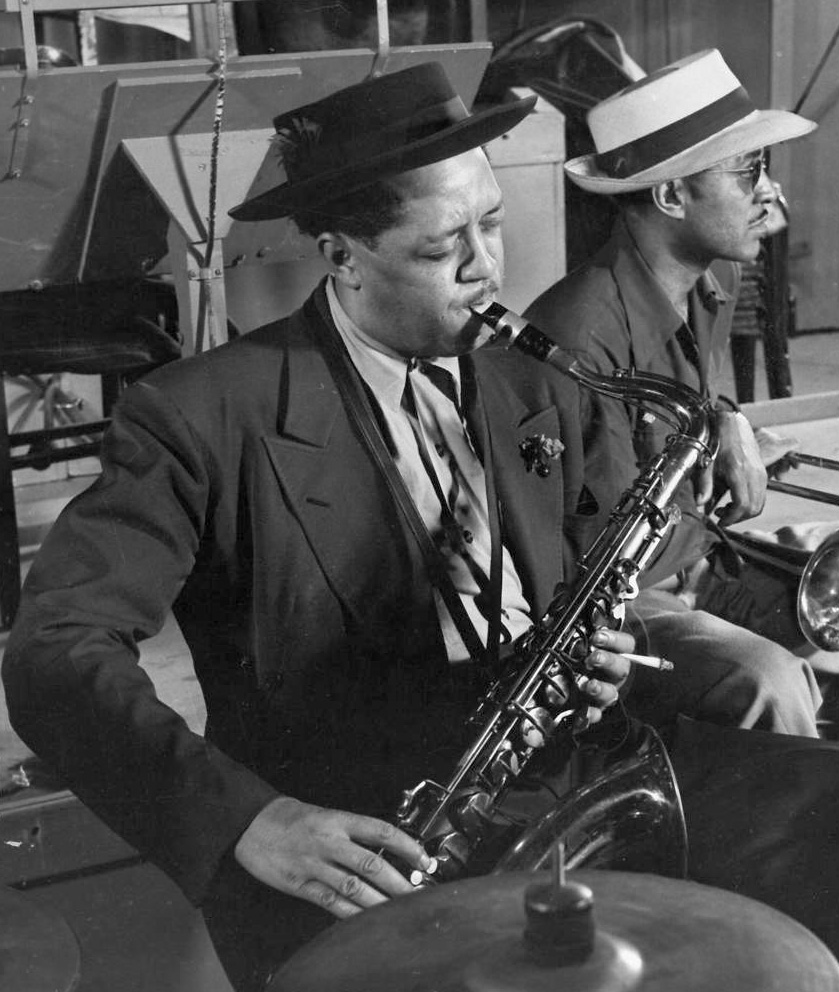
Lester Young wearing pork pie hat.

== Events ==
1944 – The Metropolitan Opera House in New York City hosts a jazz concert for the first time. The performers are Louis Armstrong, Benny Goodman, Lionel Hampton, Artie Shaw, Roy Eldridge and Jack Teagarden.

== Album releases ==
- Coleman Hawkins - Rainbow Mist (1944)

== Deaths ==
February

- 16 – Bob Zurke, American jazz pianist, arranger, composer and bandleader (born 1912).

April

- 19 – Jimmie Noone, American clarinetist (born 1895).

March

- 22 – Yank Porter, American pianist and composer (born 1895).

July

- 24 – O'Neill Spencer, American drummer and singer (born 1909).

October

- 22 – Clarence Profit, American pianist and composer (born 1912).

December

- 8 – Rod Cless, American clarinetist and saxophonist (born 1907).
- 15 – Glenn Miller, American big-band musician, arranger, composer and bandleader (born 1904).
- 19 – Miklós Vig, Hungarian singer, actor and comedian (born 1898).

Unknown date

- Tommy Stevenson, American trumpet player (born 1914).

== Births ==
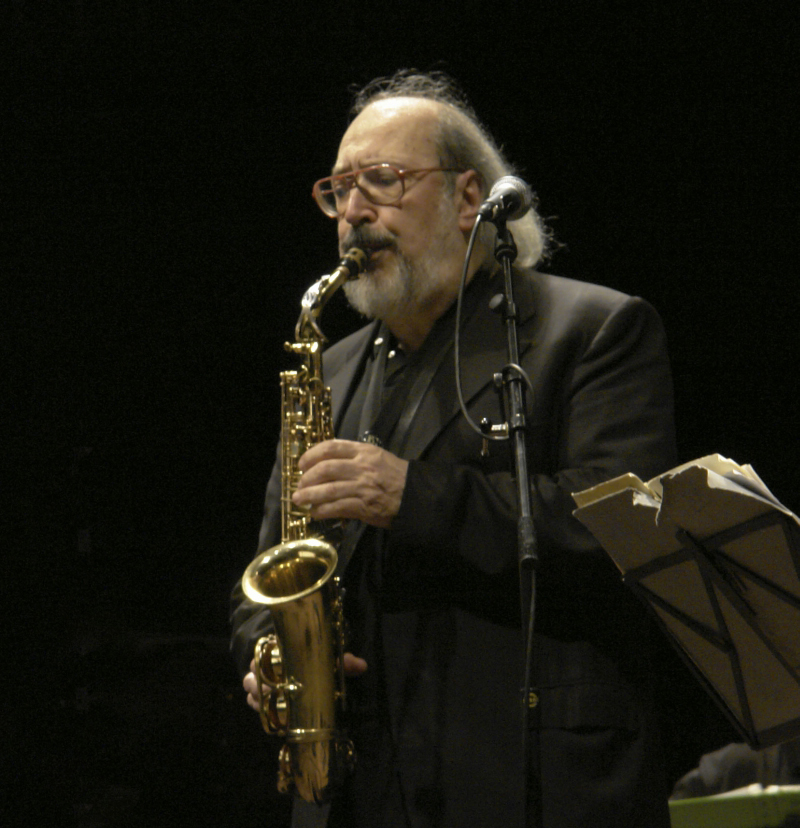
Gianluigi Trovesi in 2006.

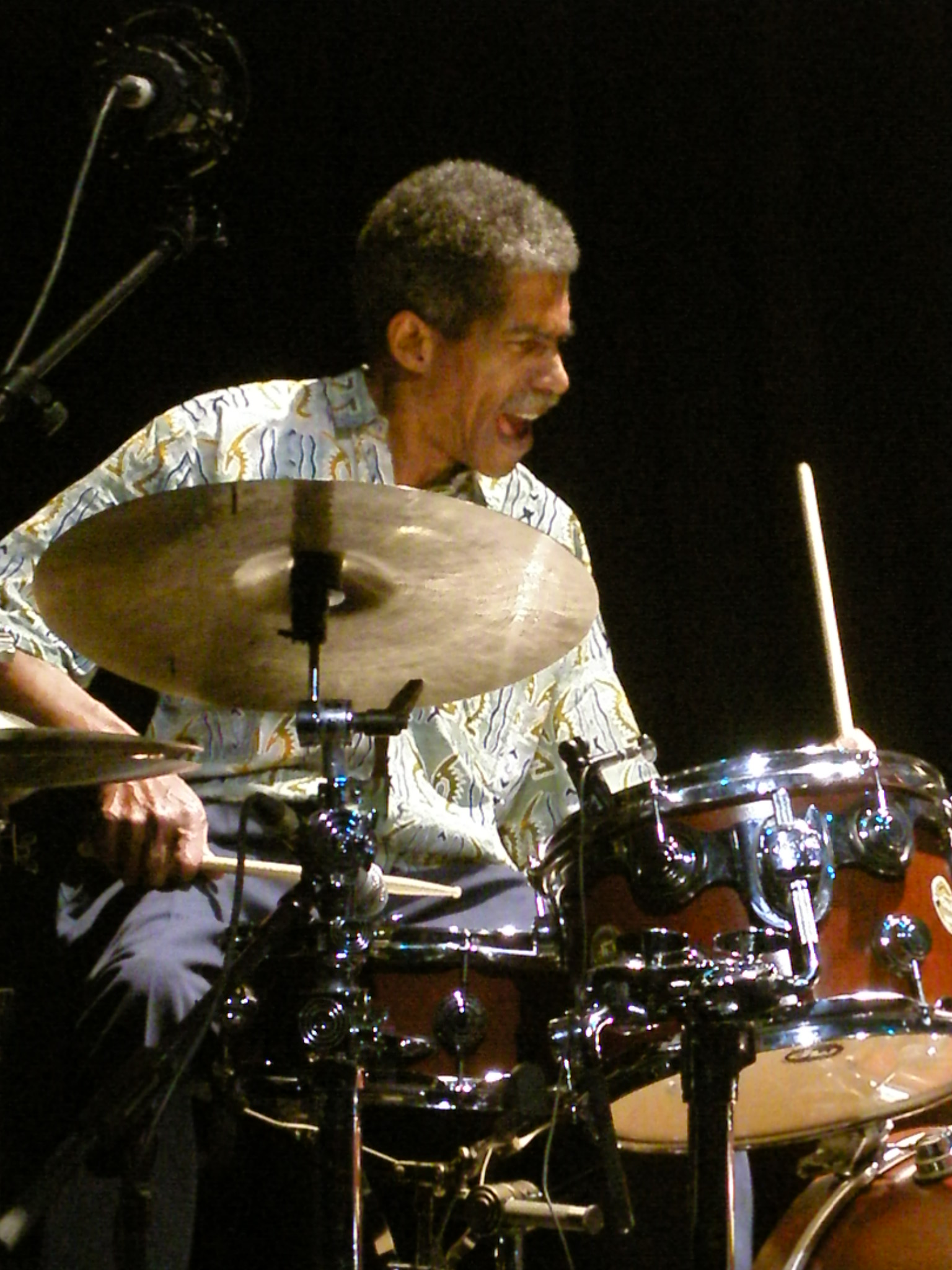
Steve Reid at Circulo de Bellas Artes 2008.

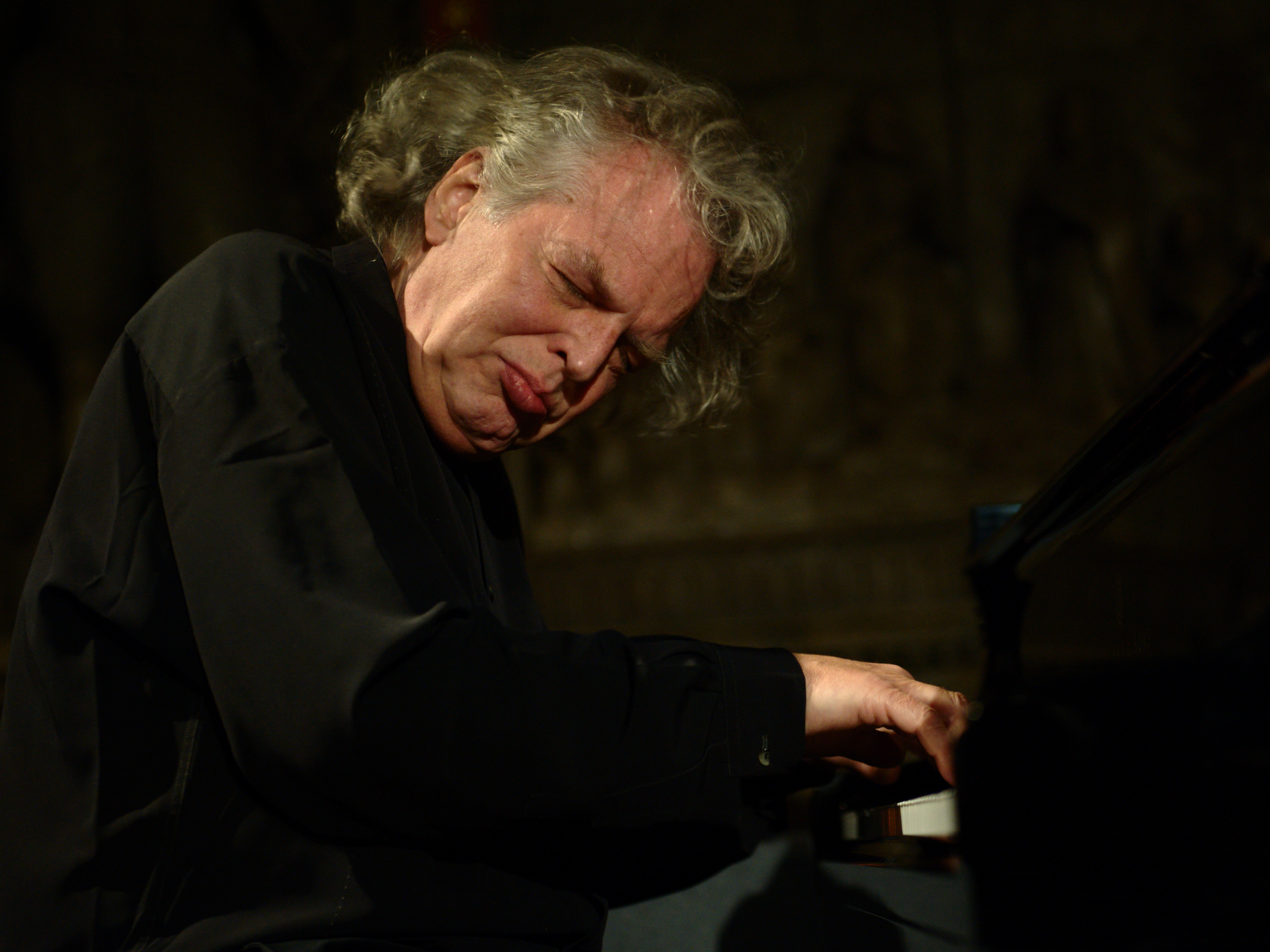
Joachim Kühn in 2016.

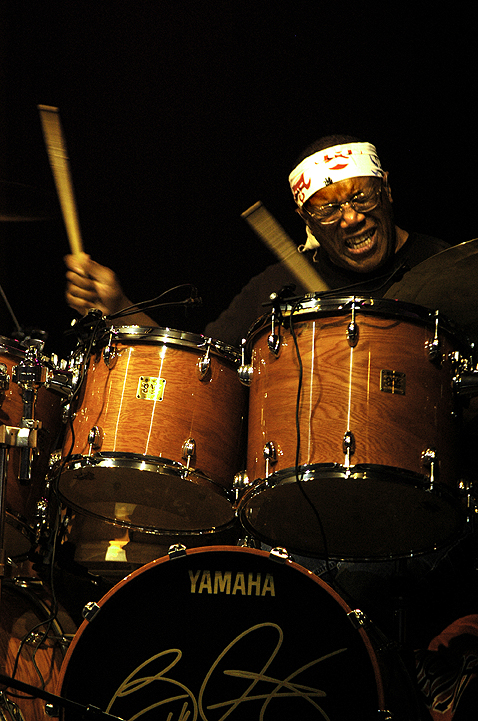
Billy Cobham

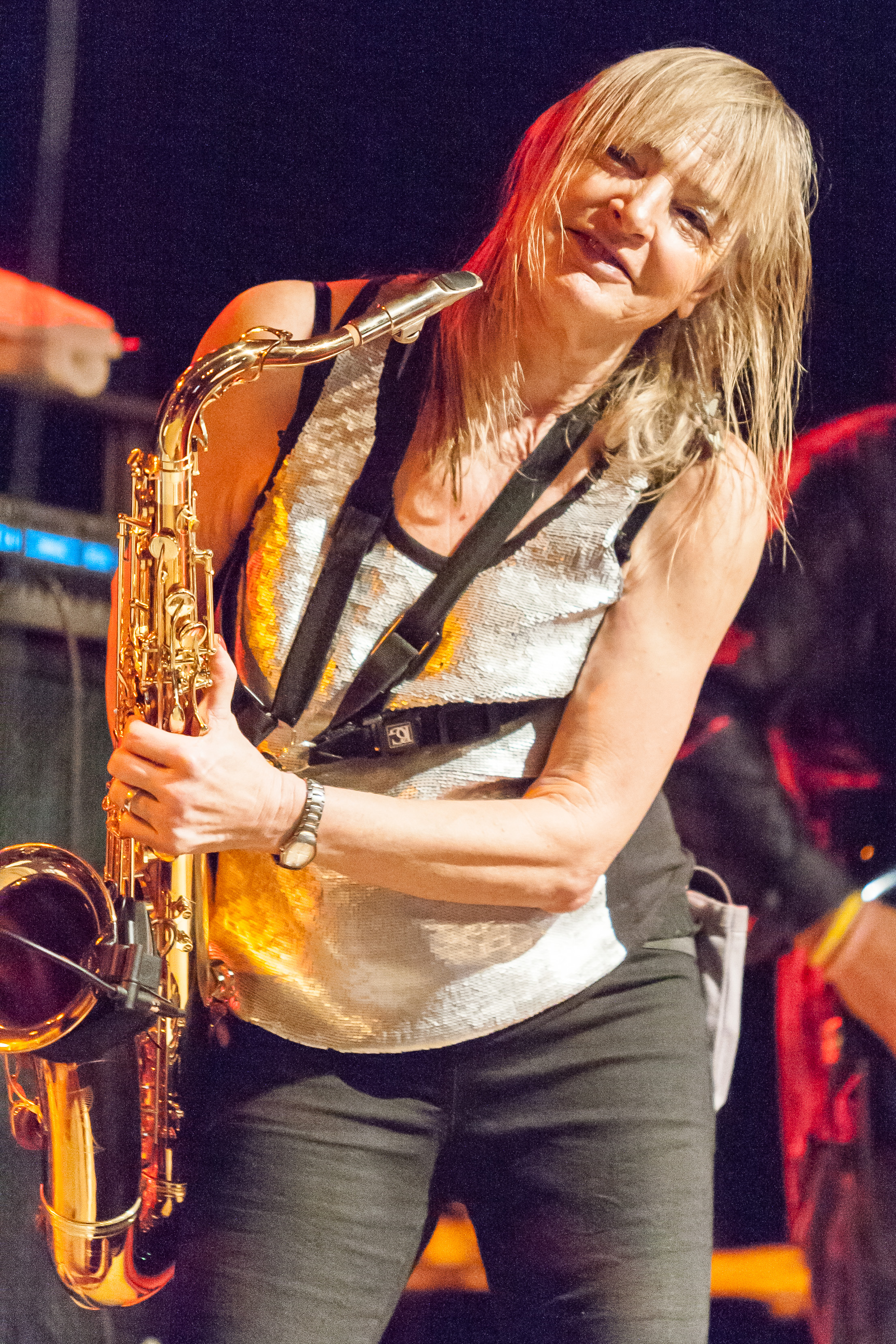
Barbara Thompson with Colosseum in 2010.

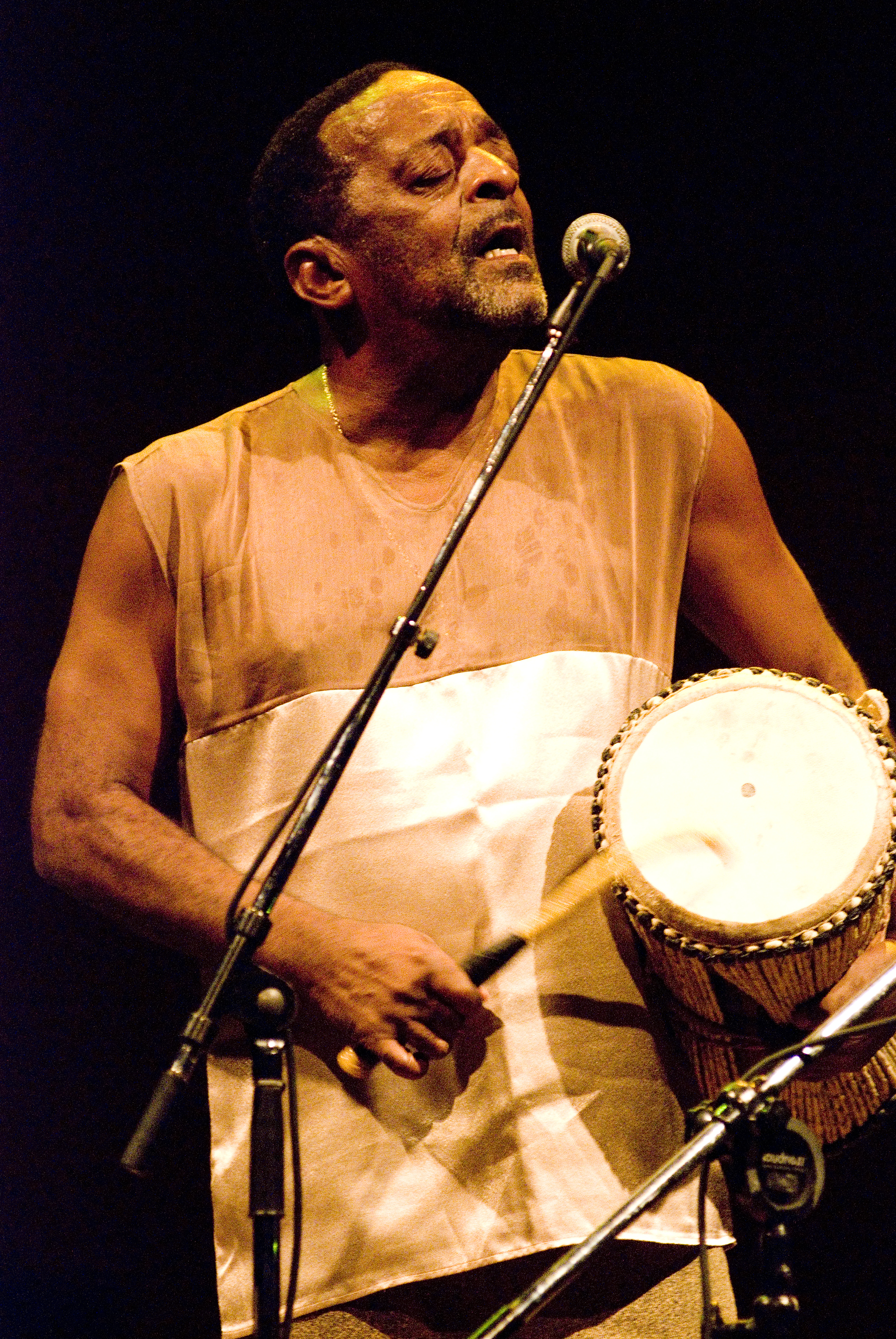
Naná Vasconcelos in 2008.

=== January ===
- 5 – Louis Stewart, Irish guitarist (died 2016).
- 6 – Don Sickler, American trumpeter.
- 8 – Bobby Battle, American drummer.
- 9 – Roy Hellvin, Norwegian pianist, composer, and music arranger.
- 10
  - Frank Sinatra Jr., American singer an orchestra leader (died 2016).
  - Gianluigi Trovesi, Italian saxophonist, clarinetist, and composer.
- 12 – Cynthia Robinson, American trumpeter and vocalist, Sly and the Family Stone (died 2015).
- 20 – Chuck Domanico, American bassist (died 2002).
- 23 – Randy Jones, British-born American drummer (died 2016).
- 24 – Bob Degen, American pianist.
- 29
  - Salena Jones, American singer.
  - Steve Reid, American drummer (died 2010).
- 30 – Roger Humphries, American drummer.

=== February ===
- 1 – Ari Brown, American tenor saxophonist and pianist.
- 5 – Bill Mays, American pianist.
- 6 – Kosuke Mine, Japanese saxophonist.
- 8 – Candy Johnson, American singer and dancer (died 2012).
- 10 – Rufus Reid, American bassist, educator, and composer.
- 11 – Martin Drew, English drummer (died 2010).
- 15 – Henry Threadgill, American composer, saxophonist, and flautist.
- 17 – Karl Jenkins, Welsh musician and composer.
- 19 – Ron Mathewson, Scottish upright bassist and bass guitarist.
- 20 – Lew Soloff, American trumpeter, composer, and actor (died 2015).
- 22 – Mark Charig, British trumpeter and cornetist.
- 24 – Oddbjørn Blindheim, Norwegian pianist.

=== March ===
- 6 – Kiri Te Kanawa, New Zealand soprano.
- 10 – David Friedman, American percussionist.
- 13 – Warren Tartaglia, American musician and poet (died 1965).
- 15
  - Jazz Summers, British music manager (lung cancer), Scissor Sisters, The Verve, and Snow Patrol (died 2015).
  - Joachim Kühn, German pianist.
  - Ralph MacDonald, Trinbagonian-American percussionist (died 2011).
- 22 – Saheb Sarbib, American upright bassist and bandleader.
- 26 – Diana Ross, American singer and actress.

=== April ===
- 5 – Evan Parker, British saxophonist.
- 7
  - Carol Grimes, British singer/songwriter poet and musician.
  - Pat LaBarbera, American saxophonist, clarinetist, and flautist.
- 16 – Sebastião Tapajós, Brazilian guitarist and composer.
- 19 – Bernie Worrell, American keyboardist and composer, Parliament-Funkadelic (died 2016).
- 20 – Iris Williams, Welsh singer (died 2025)
- 21 – Peter Kowald, German free jazz musician (died 2002).
- 22 – Howard Wyeth, American drummer and pianist (died 1996).

=== May ===
- 16 – Billy Cobham, Panamanian-American drummer, composer, and bandleader.
- 22 – Richard Dunbar, American player of the French horn (died 2006).
- 30 – John Gross, American saxophone, flute and clarinet player.

=== June ===
- 4 – Jack Wilkins, American guitarist.
- 6 – Monty Alexander, Jamaican-American pianist.
- 7 – Erling Wicklund, Norwegian trombonist and music critique.
- 8 – Babik Reinhardt, French guitarist (died 2001).
- 10 – David Goloschekin, Russian violinist and multi-instrumentalist.
- 17 – Chris Spedding, English guitarist, singer, songwriter, multi-instrumentalist, composer, and record producer.
- 19 – Chico Buarque, Brazilian singer-songwriter, guitarist.
- 21 – Jon Hiseman, English drummer, recording engineer, and record producer (died 2018).
- 24
  - Chris Wood, English saxophonist and flautist, Traffic (died 1983).
  - Jeff Beck, English guitarist.
- 25
  - Bobby Naughton, American vibraphonist.
  - Dave Cliff, British guitarist.
- 26 – Arthur Doyle, American saxophonist, flutist, and vocalist (died 2014).

=== July ===
- 4
  - Butch Miles, American drummer.
  - Harvey Brooks, American bassist.
  - Jan Erik Kongshaug, Norwegian guitarist, sound engineer, and composer.
- 15 – Martha Brooks, Canadian writer and singer.
- 17 – Aage Teigen, Norwegian trombonist (died 2014).
- 19 – Didier Levallet, French upright bassist.
- 21 – Orange Kellin, Swedish clarinetist.
- 27 – Barbara Thompson, English saxophonist, and flautist.

=== August ===
- 2
  - Albert Stinson, American upright bassist (died 1969).
  - Naná Vasconcelos, Brazilian percussionist and vocalist (died 2016).
- 4 – Bobo Stenson, Swedish pianist.
- 5 – Phil Wachsmann, English violinist.
- 8 – John Renbourn, English guitarist and songwriter (died 2015).
- 18 – Oscar Brashear, American trumpeter.
- 20 – Terry Clarke, Canadian drummer.
- 25 – Pat Martino, American guitarist.
- 30 – John Surman English saxophone, bass clarinet, and pianist.

=== September ===
- 3 – Fred Hess, American tenor saxophonist (died 2018).
- 9 – George Mraz, Czech-American bassist and alto saxophonist.
- 18 – Michael Franks, American singer and songwriter.
- 21 – John Clark, American hornist and composer.
- 26 – Judy Chamberlain, American singer, bandleader and journalist.

=== October ===
- 4 – Eddie Gómez, Puerto Rican upright bassist.
- 26 – Kenneth Ascher, American pianist, composer, and arranger.
- 31 – Sherman Ferguson, American drummer (died 2006).

=== November ===
- 2 – Keith Emerson, English pianist and keyboardist (died 2016).
- 4 – Willem Breuker, Dutch saxophonist (died 2010).
- 8 – Charles Sullivan or Kamau Muata Adilifu, American trumpeter.
- 13 – Kenny "Blues Boss" Wayne, American pianist, singer and songwriter.
- 14 – George Cables, American pianist and composer.

=== December ===
- 12
  - Alex Acuña, Peruvian drummer and percussionist.
  - Michael Carvin, American drummer.
- 15 – Carlos Inzillo, Argentinian clarinetist, producer, and historian.
- 16 – John Abercrombie, American guitarist (died 2017).
- 17 – Vyacheslav Ganelin, Lithuanian–Israeli musician and composer.
- 19
  - Alvin Lee, English singer and guitarist (died 2013).
  - Steve Tyrell, American producer and vocalist.
- 24 – Woody Shaw, trumpeter, flugelhornist, and cornetist (died 1989).
- 31 – Bernie Senensky, Canadian pianist, organist, and composer.

=== Unknown date ===
- Lars Edegran, American musician and bandleader.
- Tom Parker, British pianist (died 2013).
- Wally Shoup, American saxophonist and painter.

== See also ==
- 1940s in jazz
- List of years in jazz
- 1944 in music

== Bibliography ==
- The New Real Book, Volume I. Sher Music. 1988. ISBN 0-9614701-4-3.
- The New Real Book, Volume II. Sher Music. 1991. ISBN 0-9614701-7-8.
- The New Real Book, Volume III. Sher Music. 1995. ISBN 1-883217-30-X.
- The Real Book, Volume I (6th ed.). Hal Leonard. 2004. ISBN 0-634-06038-4.
- The Real Book, Volume II (2nd ed.). Hal Leonard. 2007. ISBN 978-1-4234-2452-9.
- The Real Book, Volume III (2nd ed.). Hal Leonard. 2006. ISBN 0-634-06136-4.
- The Real Jazz Book. Warner Bros. ISBN 978-91-85041-36-7.
- The Real Vocal Book, Volume I. Hal Leonard. 2006. ISBN 0-634-06080-5.
