= 1919 in jazz =

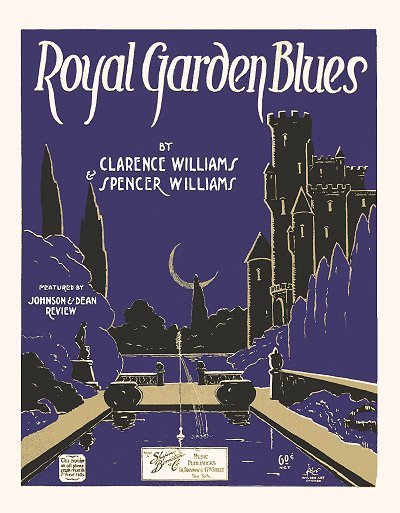
- "Royal Garden Blues" sheet music cover.
- Decade: Pre-1920 in jazz
- Music: 1919 in music
- Standards: List of pre-1920 jazz standards
- See also: 1918 in jazz – 1920 in jazz

This is a timeline documenting events of jazz in the year 1919.

Births in that year included Art Blakey and Nat King Cole.

== Events ==
- The Red Summer took place in the United States. Although 70 blacks were killed by white mobs, a monumental step was made when the NAACP promoted the slogan "The new Negro has no fear", which helped the cause of jazz.
- The Original Dixieland Jazz Band visited England in 1919 and generated new interest in the new music. Swiss conductor Ernest Ansermet also delivered an accolade to Sidney Bechet in Revue Romande, considered the first serious article on jazz in history, and Bechet is lauded as a gifted musician by many classical European musicians.
- Sidney Bechet moves to New York City and joins Will Marion Cook's Southern Syncopated Orchestra and later travels to Europe where he discovers the soprano saxophone.
- February -James Reese Europe and his Hellfighters return home and soon go on a tour of the states .
- May 9- James Reese Europe is stabbed to death by Herbert Wright.

== Standards ==
- In 1919 the popular standard "Baby Won't You Please Come Home" was published.

== Deaths ==
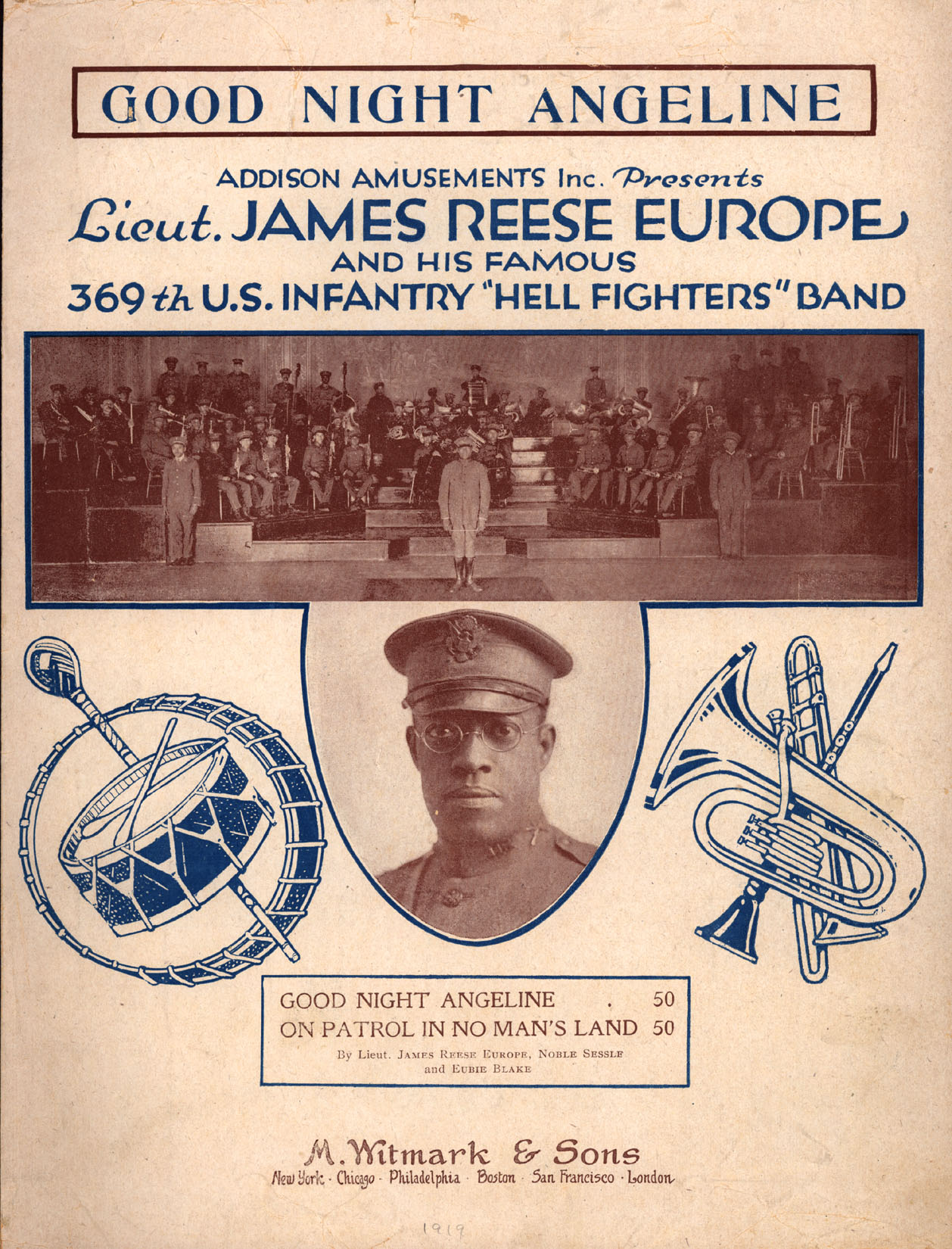
1919 sheet music cover for "Good Night Angeline" with photo of James Reese Europe and his famous 369th U.S. Infantry "Hell Fighters" Band

February

- 18 – Henry Ragas, American jazz pianist who played with the Original Dixieland Jass Band on their earliest recording sessions (born 1891).

May

- 9 – James Reese Europe, American ragtime and early jazz bandleader, arranger, and composer (born 1880).

Unknown date

== Births ==
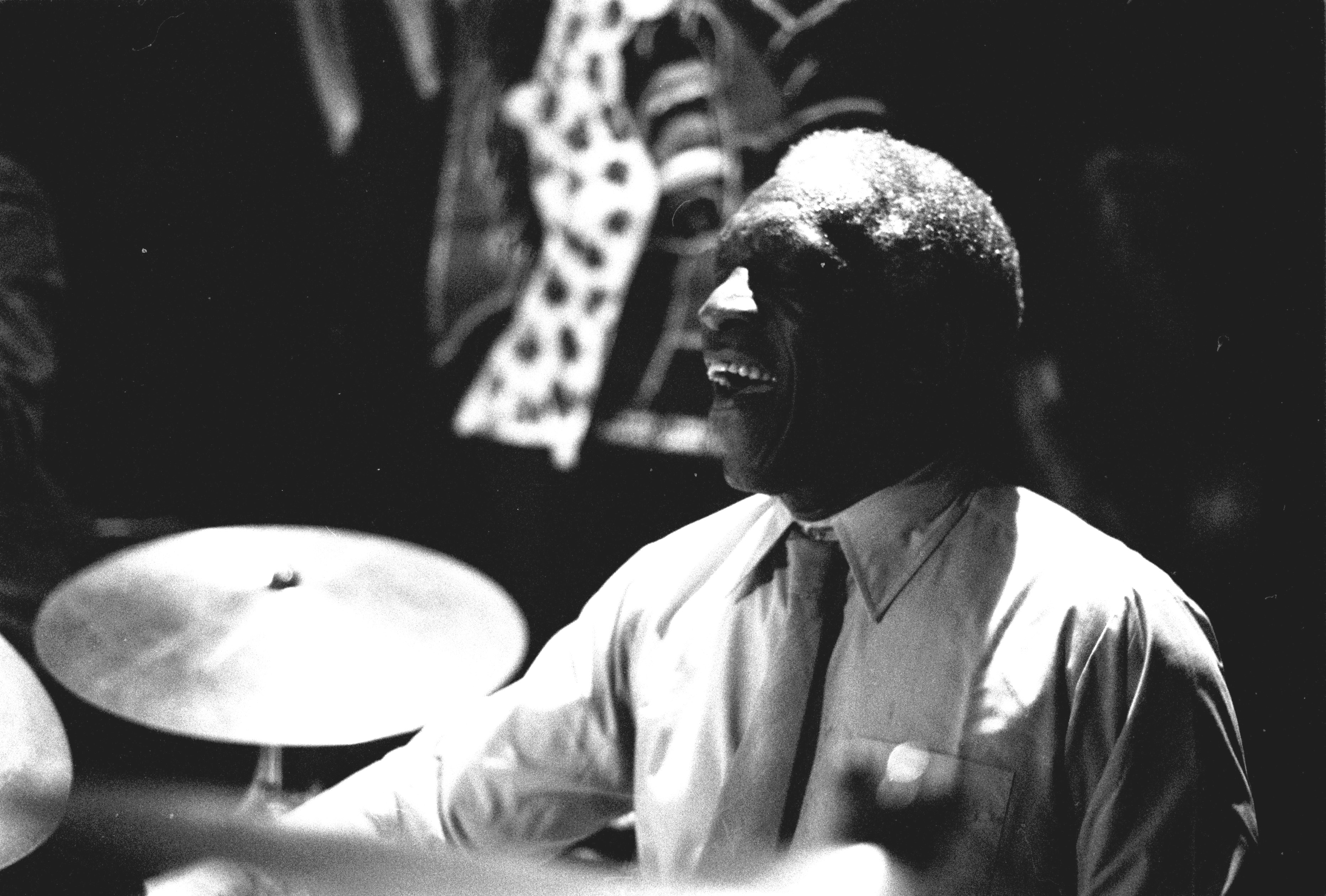
Art Blakey in 1985

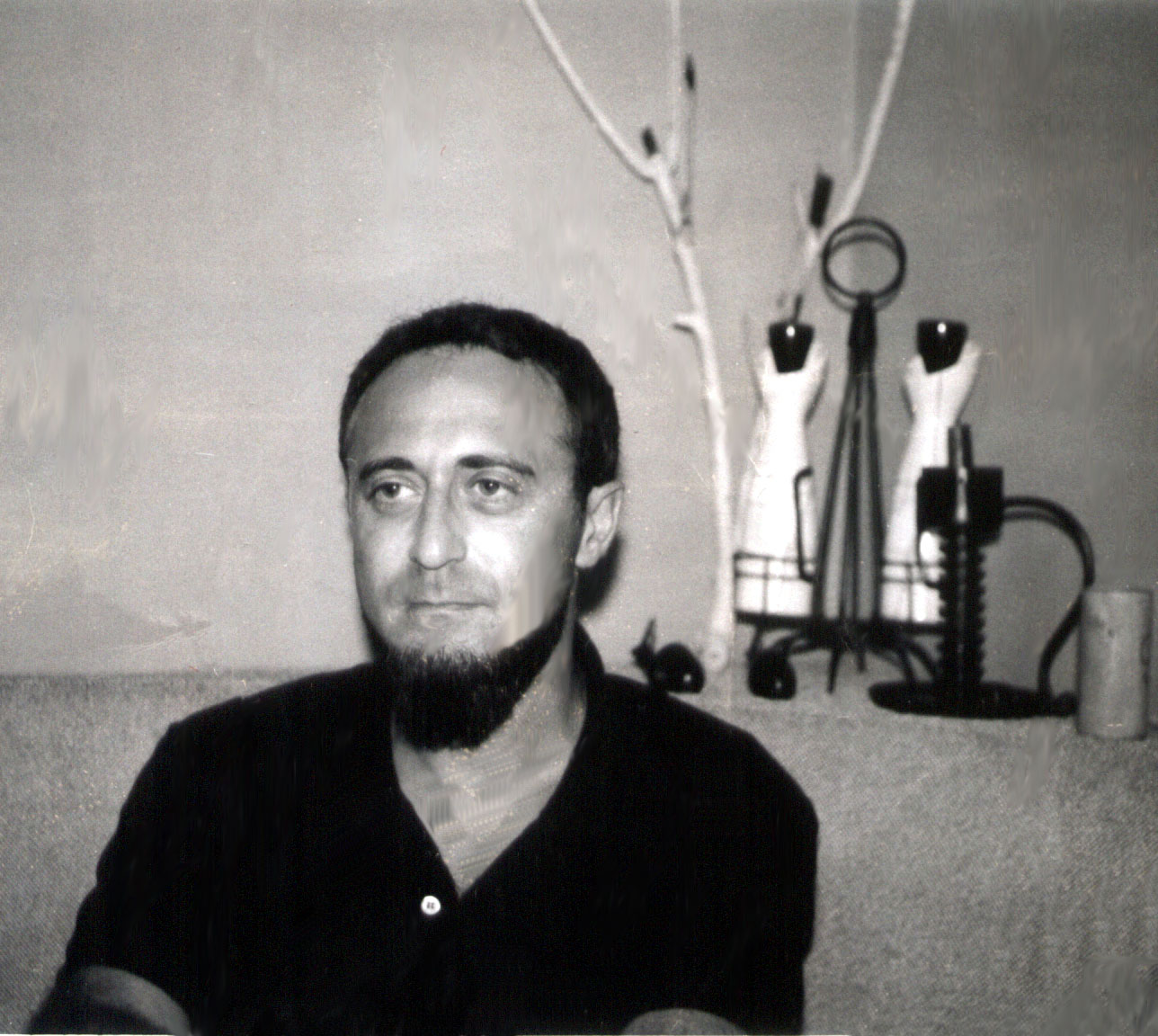
Arnold Fishkind c. 1960

January

- 1 – Al McKibbon, American upright double bassist (died 2005).
- 3 – Herbie Nichols, American pianist and composer (died 1963).
- 15 – Steve Jordan, American guitarist (died 1993).
- 19 – Israel Crosby, American upright bassist (died 1962).

February

- 3 – Snooky Young, American trumpeter (died 2011).
- 8 – Buddy Morrow, American trombonist (died 2010).

March

- 1 – Kenny Trimble, American trombonist (died 1991).
- 11 – Mercer Ellington, American trumpeter (died 1996).
- 14 – Luther Henderson, American pianist (died 2003).
- 15 – Randy Brooks, American trumpeter (died 1967).
- 17 – Nat King Cole, American pianist and vocalist (died 1965).
- 19 – Lennie Tristano, American pianist (died 1978).

April

- 5 – Tío Tom, Afro-Cuban musician (died 1991).
- 21 – Don Cornell, American singer (died 2004).
- 23 – Benny Harris, American trumpeter (died 1975).

May

- 4 – Mary Ann McCall, American singer (died 1994).
- 19 – Georgie Auld, American saxophonist and clarinetist (died 1990).
- 23 – Johnny Bothwell, American alto saxophonist (died 1995).
- 24 – Herbie Fields, American saxophonist (died 1958).
- 26 – Calvin Jackson, American pianist (died 1985).
- 30 – Joe McQueen, American saxophonist (died 2019).

June

- 8 – Erwin Lehn, German musician and composer (died 2010).
- 10 – Moultrie Patten, American actor and pianist (died 2009).
- 16 – Al Viola, American guitarist (died 2007).
- 18 – Thore Swanerud, Swedish pianist, vibraphonist, arranger, conductor, and composer (died 1988).
- 22 – Ella Johnson, American singer (died 2004).

July

- 15 – Sadik Hakim, American pianist and composer (died 1983).
- 20 – Arnold Fishkind, American jazz bassist (died 1999).
- 23 – Jim Chapin, American drummer (died 2009).
- 29 – Vic Lewis, British guitarist and bandleader (died 2009).

August

- 13 – George Shearing, British pianist (died 2011).
- 17 – Irv Williams, American jazz saxophonist and composer (died 2019).

September

- 6 – John Malachi, American pianist (died 1987).
- 11 – Peck Morrison, American jazz bassist (died 1988).
- 12 – Bill Jennings, American guitarist and composer (died 1978).
- 17 – Peggy Mann, American singer (died 1988).
- 21 – Herman Fowlkes Jr., American musician (died 1993).
- 25 – Shadow Wilson, American drummer (died 1959).
- 28 – Fred Lange-Nielsen, Norwegian bassist and vocalist (died 1989).

October

- 4 – Joe Benjamin, American bassist (died 1974).
- 8
  - Flavio Ambrosetti, Swiss vibraphonist, saxophonist, and engineer (died 2012).
  - Hal Singer, American bandleader and saxophonist (died 2020).
- 11 – Art Blakey, American drummer and bandleader (died 1990).
- 14
  - Bernard Anderson, American trumpeter (died 1997).
  - Johnny Desmond, American singer (died 1985).
- 23 – Anita O'Day, American singer (died 2006).
- 27 – Babs Gonzales, American vocalist (died 1980).

December

- 1 – Ike Isaacs, English guitarist (died 1996).
- 18 – Barry Galbraith, American guitarist (died 1983).
- 20 – Reinhold Svensson, Swedish pianist, Hammond organist, and composer (died 1968).
- 22 – Lil Green, American singer and songwriter (died 1954).
- 24 – Henry Coker, American trombonist (died 1979).
- 25 – Joe Carroll, American vocalist (died 1981).
- 27 – Booty Wood, American trombonist (died 1987).
