= 1990 in jazz =

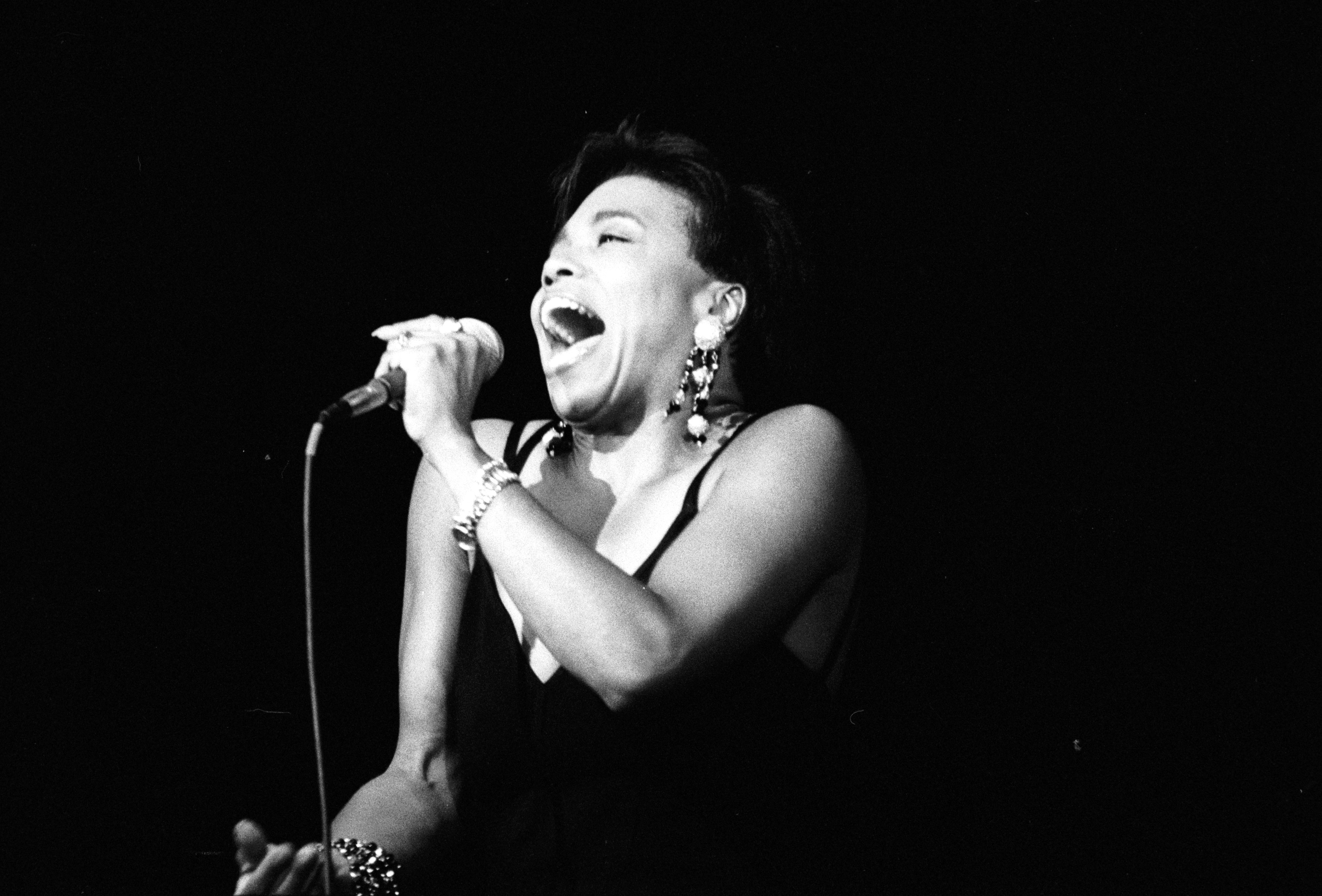
- Jazz singer Dee Dee Bridgewater in 1990 at Deauville, Normandy, France
- Decade: 1990s in jazz
- Music: 1990 in music
- Standards: List of post-1950 jazz standards
- See also: 1989 in jazz – 1991 in jazz

This is a timeline documenting events of Jazz in the year 1990.

== Events ==
=== April ===
- 6 – The 17th Vossajazz started in Vossavangen, Norway (April 6 – 8).

=== May ===
- 23 – The 18th Nattjazz started in Bergen, Norway (May 23 – June 3).

=== June ===
- 1 – The 19th Moers Festival started in Moers, Germany (June 1 – 4).
- 1 – The 13th Atlanta Jazz Festival started in Atlanta, Georgia (June 1 – 3, July 6 – 8, August 3 – 5).

=== July ===
- 7 – 24th Montreux Jazz Festival started in Switzerland (July 7 – 22).
- 12 – The 15th North Sea Jazz Festival started in The Hague (July 12 – 15).

=== August ===
- 17 – The 7th Brecon Jazz Festival started in Brecon, Wales (April 17 – 19).

=== September ===
- 21 – The 33rd Monterey Jazz Festival started in Monterey, California (September 21 – 23).

=== Unknown date ===
- Eliane Elias and Randy Brecker were divorced.

== Album releases ==
- Ben Sidran: Cool Paradise
- Bill Frisell: Is That You?
- Bobby Previte: Empty Suits
- Butch Morris: Dust To Dust
- Carol Sloane: The Real Thing
- Charlie Haden: Dream Keeper
- Danny Gottlieb: Brooklyn Blues
- David Liebman: The Tree
- David Ware: Great Bliss
- Don Pullen: Random Thoughts
- Egberto Gismondi: Infancia
- Elements: Spirit River
- Eric Reed: Soldier's Hymn
- Eliane Elias: Eliane Elias Plays Jobim
- Franz Koglmann: The Use of Memory
- Geri Allen: The Nurturer
- Gerry Hemingway: Down To The Wire
- Gerry Hemingway: Special Detail
- Hank Roberts: Birds Of Prey
- ICP Orchestra: Bospaadje Konijnehol II
- Jazz Passengers: Implement Yourself
- John Pizzarelli: My Blue Heaven
- John Zorn: Naked City
- Keith Tippett: The Journey
- Kenny Wheeler: Music for Large & Small Ensembles
- Kenny Wheeler: Widow in the Window
- Marilyn Crispell: Overlapping Hands: Eight Segments
- Mark Helias: Attack the Future
- Marty Ehrlich: Emergency Peace
- Matthew Shipp: Circular Temple
- Michael Formanek: Wide Open Spaces
- Michael Franks: Blue Pacific
- Muhal Richard Abrams: Blu Blu Blu
- Music Revelation Ensemble: Elec Jazz
- Myra Melford: Jump
- Philip Catherine: I Remember You
- Phil Woods: All Bird's Children
- Ray Anderson: What Because
- Terence Blanchard: Terence Blanchard
- Tom Harrell: Form
- Yellowjackets: Green House

== Deaths ==
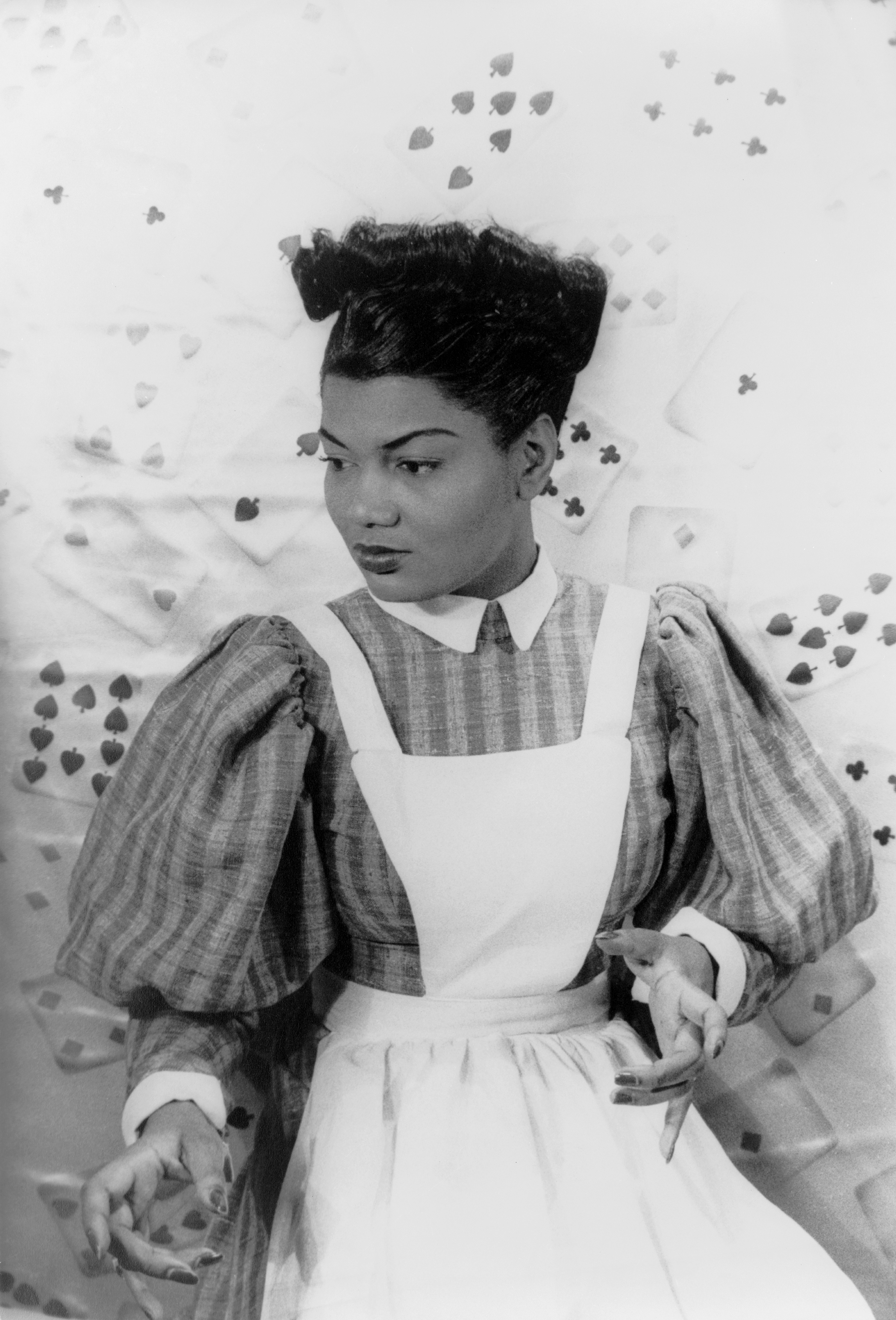
Pearl Bailey in “St. Louis Woman”, 1946

January

- 3 – Peter van Steeden, Dutch-American composer (born 1904).
- 8 – Georgie Auld, Canadian tenor saxophonist, clarinetist, and bandleader (born 1919).
- 9 – Buschi Niebergall, German free jazz musician (born 1938).

February

- 2 – Mel Lewis, American drummer and bandleader (born 1929).
- 4 – Fritz Schulz-Reichel, German pianist (born 1912).
- 5 – King Perry, American saxophonist, clarinetist, arranger, and bandleader (born 1914).
- 21 – John Madrid, American trumpeter (born 1948).
- 27 – Arthur Österwall, Swedish band leader, composer, vocalist, and upright bassist (born 1910).
- 28 – Russell Jacquet, American trumpeter (born 1917).

March

- 12 – Harry South, English pianist, composer, and arranger (born 1929).
- 17 – Jack Noren, American drummer and vocalist (born 1929).
- 23 – Al Sears, American tenor saxophonist and bandleader (born 1910).

April

- 3 – Sarah Vaughan, American singer (born 1924).
- 5 – Louis Nelson, American trombonist (born 1902).
- 25 – Dexter Gordon, American tenor saxophonist (born 1923).

May

- 4 – Emily Remler, American guitarist (born 1957).
- 7 – Elizete Cardoso, Argentine singer and actress (born 1920).
- 16 – Sammy Davis Jr., American singer and entertainer (born 1925).
- 17 – Frank Wright, American tenor saxophonist (born 1935).
- 18
  - Eje Thelin, Swedish trombonist (born 1938).
  - Sing Miller, American pianist (born 1914).
- 26 – Chris McGregor, South African pianist, bandleader, and composer (born 1936).

June

- 2 – Walter Davis Jr., American pianist (born 1932).
- 7 – Lou Blackburn, American trombonist (born 1922).
- 10 – Hubert Rostaing, Algierian-French clarinetist and tenor saxophonist (born 1918).
- 11 – Clyde McCoy, American trumpeter (born 1903).
- 21 – June Christy, American singer (born 1925).
- 28 – Howard Roberts, American guitarist (born 1929).
- 30 – Dudu Pukwana, South African saxophonist, composer, and pianist (born 1938).

July

- 21 – Joe Turner, American pianist (born 1907).
- 31 – Lowell Davidson, American pianist (born 1941).

August

- 12 – Harry Leahey, American guitarist (born 1935).
- 14 – Chester Zardis, American upright bassist (born 1900).
- 17 – Pearl Bailey, American actress and singer (born 1918).

September

- 3 – Betty Glamann, American jazz harpist (born 1923).
- 23 – George Desmond Hodnett, Irish composer, piano, trumpet, and zither player (born 1918).
- 29 – Freddie Kohlman, American drummer, vocalist, and bandleader (born 1918).

October

- 1 – Phil Napoleon, American trumpeter and bandleader (born 1901).
- 5 – Sam Taylor, American tenor saxophonist (born 1916).
- 6 – Asser Fagerström, Finnish pianist, composer, and actor (born 1912).
- 16 – Art Blakey, American drummer and bandleader, The Jazz Messengers (born 1919).
- 25 – Major Holley, American upright bassist (born 1914).
- 27 – Xavier Cugat, bandleader (born 1900).

November

- 4 – William Leavitt, American guitarist and arranger (born 1925).
- 16 – Lee Castle, American trumpeter and bandleader (born 1915).
- 26
  - Dave Wilkins, Barbadian trumpeter (born 1914).
  - Rita Ora, British singer-songwriter and actor.

December

- 5 – Bill Hardman, American trumpeter and flugelhornist (born 1933).
- 18 – Bernard Addison, American guitarist (born 1905).

Unknown date

- Francis Coppieters, Belgian pianist (born 1930).

== Births ==
January

- 17 – Diknu Schneeberger, Austrian guitarist.

February

- 13 – Jonathan Chua, Singaporean drummer.

March

- 27 – Kimbra Lee Johnson, New Zealand singer and actress.

April

- 20 – Sebastian Nordström, Swedish bassist.

July

- 11 – Ole Mofjell, Norwegian drummer.
- 23 – Torgeir Standal, Norwegian guitarist.

August

- 15 – Benjamin Kheng, Singaporean guitarist/pianist/composer and brony.

September

- 15 – Laura Jurd, British trumpet and synthesizer player.

October

- 25
  - Austin Peralta, American pianist. At age 15, a featured performer at the 2006 Tokyo Jazz Festival (died 2012).
  - Marthe Wang, Norwegian singer and songwriter.

November

- 27 – Mette Henriette, Norwegian saxophonist, improviser, and autodidact composer.

December

- 20 – Corrie Dick, Scottish drummer, percussionist, vocalist, and composer.
- 25 – Sandra Riley Tang, Singaporean female double-bassist.

Unknown date

- Alper Tuzcu, Turkish singer, composer, and music producer.
- Charlotte Dos Santos, Norwegian vocalist, composer, and arranger.
- Martin Masakowski, American bassist.

== See also ==
- 1990s in jazz
- List of years in jazz
- 1990 in music
