= 1991 in jazz =

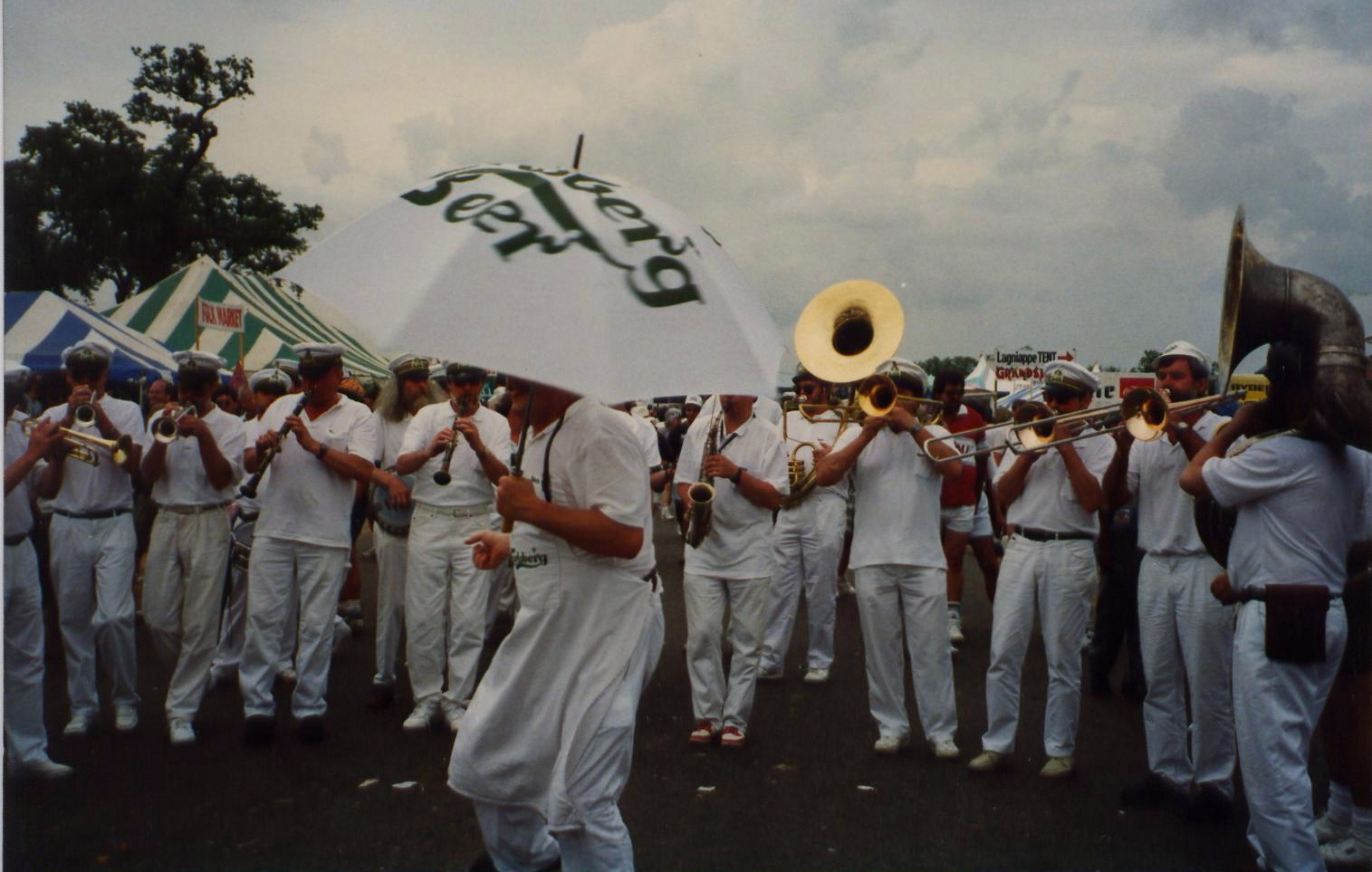
- New Orleans Jazz Fest 1991. Carlsberg Brass Band
- Decade: 1990s in jazz
- Music: 1991 in music
- Standards: List of post-1950 jazz standards
- See also: 1990 in jazz – 1992 in jazz

This is a timeline documenting events of Jazz in the year 1991.

== Events ==
=== March ===
- 22 – The 18th Vossajazz started in Vossavangen, Norway (March 22 – 24).

=== May ===
- 17 – The 20th Moers Festival started in Moers, Germany (May 17 – 20).
- 22 – The 19th Nattjazz started in Bergen, Norway (May 22 – June 2).

=== July ===
- 2 – 25th Montreux Jazz Festival started in Switzerland (July 2 – 21).
- 11 – The 16th North Sea Jazz Festival started in The Hague (July 11 – 14).

=== August ===
- 16 – The 8th Brecon Jazz Festival started in Brecon, Wales (April 16 – 18).

=== September ===
- 20 – The 34th Monterey Jazz Festival started in Monterey, California (September 20 – 22).

=== Unknown date ===
- Carla Bley divorced Michael Mantler.
- Carla Bley was married to Steve Swallow.

== Album releases ==
- Steve Lacy: Remains
- Wayne Horvitz: Bring Your Camera
- John Butcher: Thirteen Friendly Numbers
- Guy Klucevsek: Flying Vegetables of the Apocalypse
- Michael Formanek: Extended Animation
- Randy Weston: Spirits Of Our Ancestors
- Bill Frisell: Where in the World?
- Don Byron: Tuskegee Experiments
- Marilyn Crispell: Images
- Chick Corea Elektric Band: Beyond the Mask
- Bobby Previte: Weather Clear, Track Fast
- Music Revelation Ensemble: After Dark
- Sonny Sharrock: Ask the Ages
- Steve Coleman: Black Science
- Joe Lovano: From the Soul
- David Sanborn: Another Hand
- Don Pullen: Kele Mou Bana
- Terje Rypdal: Q.E.D.
- Jackie McLean: Rites of Passage
- Joanne Brackeen: Is It Really True
- John Scofield: Meant to Be
- John Patitucci: Heart of the Bass
- Julius Hemphill: Fat Man and the Hard Blues
- London Jazz Composers' Orchestra: Theoria
- Wynton Marsalis: Blue Interlude
- Marty Ehrlich: Side by Side
- Tim Berne: Can't Put My Finger On It
- Joanne Brackeen: Where Legends Dwell
- Joey Baron: Tongue in Groove
- Max Roach: To the Max
- Robert Dick: Venturi Shadows
- Freddie Hubbard: Temptation
- Fred Hersh: Forward Motion
- Steve Swallow: Swallow
- Marcus Roberts: As Serenity Approaches
- Steve Turre: Right There
- Trilok Gurtu: Living Magic
- Branford Marsalis: The Beautiful Ones Are Not Yet Born
- Christy Doran: What a Band
- Yellowjackets: Politics
- David S. Ware: Great Bliss, Vol. 1
- David S. Ware: Great Bliss, Vol. 2
- Eliane Elias: A Long Story

== Deaths ==
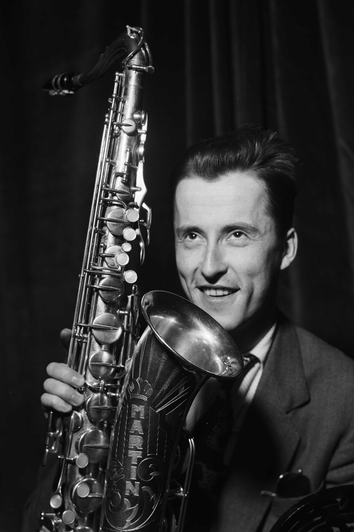
Bjarne Nerem

January

- 4
  - Eddie Barefield, American saxophonist, clarinetist, and arranger (born 19091).
  - Leo Wright, American alto saxophonist, flautist, and clarinetist (born 1933).
- 10 – Bob Wallis, British trumpeter (born 1934).
- 14 – Miles Copeland Jr., American musician (born 1916).

February

- 10 – Tío Tom, Afro-Cuban musician (born 1919).
- 26 – Slim Gaillard, American singer, songwriter, pianist, guitarist, vibraphonist, and tenor saxophonist (born 1916).

March

- 3 – Sal Nistico, American tenor saxophonist (born 1938).
- 15 – Bud Freeman, American tenor saxophonist, clarinetist, bandleader, and composer (born 1906).
- 20 – Billy Butler, American guitarist (born 1924).
- 25 – Rusty Bryant, American tenor and alto saxophonist (born 1929).
- 31 – John Carter, American clarinetist, saxophonist, and flautist (born 1929).

April

- 1
  - Bjarne Nerem, Norwegian tenor saxophonist, alto saxophonist, and clarinetist (born 1923).
  - Jon Eardley, American trumpeter (born 1928).
- 16 – Ove Lind, Swedish clarinetist (born 1926).
- 19 – Barry Rogers, American trombonist (born 1935).

May

- 3 – Harry Gibson, American pianist, singer, and songwriter (born 1915).
- 8 – Kenny Trimble, American trombonist (born 1919).

June

- 6 – Stan Getz, American saxophonist (born 1927).
- 23 – Masayuki Takayanagi, Japanese guitarist (born 1932).
- 29 – Richard Holmes, American organist (born 1931).

July

- 24 – Tullio Mobiglia, Italian saxophonist and bandleader (born 1911).
- 31 – Charlie Beal, American pianist (born 1908).

August

- 4 – Jeri Southern, American pianist and singer (born 1926).
- 10 – Buster Smith, American alto saxophonist (born 1904).

September

- 4 – Charlie Barnet, American saxophonist, composer, and bandleader (born 1913).
- 28 – Miles Davis American trumpeter, bandleader, and composer (born 1926).

October

- 1 – Stu Williamson, American trumpeter and valve trombonist (born 1933).

November

- 9 – Lance Hayward, Bermudan-American pianist (born 1916).

December

- 8 – Buck Clayton, American trumpeter (born 1911).
- 12 – Ronnie Ross, British baritone saxophonist (born 1933).
- 18 – King Kolax, American trumpeter and bandleader (born 1912).
- 22 – Beaver Harris, American drummer (born 1936).
- 31 – Pat Patrick, American baritone saxophonist, alto saxophonist, and guitar bassist (born 1929).

== Births ==
February

- 4 – Kjetil Mulelid, Norwegian pianist and composer.

March

- 27 – Braxton Cook, American alto saxophonist and composer.

April

- 10 – Andreas Skår Winther, Norwegian drummer.
- 23 – Jean Rondeau, French harpsichordist.
- 26 – Will Heard, English singer, songwriter, and multi-instrumentalist.

May

- 10 – Jimmy Macbride, American drummer and composer.

June

- 11 – Aaron M. Johnson, American jazz saxophonist and bandleader.

July

- 26 – Nathan Hartono, Indonesian multi-instrumentalist and vocalist.

September

- 21 – Ai Kuwabara, Japanese pianist.
- 25 – Per Kamfjord, Norwegian drummer.

October

- 20 – Henrik Lødøen, Norwegian drummer.

Unknown date

- Bendik Baksaas, Norwegian electronica artist.
- Magnus Bakken, Norwegian saxophonist.
- Olli Soikkeli, Finnish guitarist.

== See also ==
- 1990s in jazz
- List of years in jazz
- 1991 in music
