= 1914 in jazz =

- Decade: 1910s in jazz
- Music: 1914 in music
- Standards: List of pre-1920 jazz standards
- See also: 1913 in jazz – 1915 in jazz

This is a timeline documenting events of Jazz in the year 1914.

== Events ==
- Pianist W.C. Handy composed the St. Louis Blues.

== Births ==
January

- 9 – Kenny Clarke, American drummer and bandleader, nicknamed "Klook" (died 1985).

February

- 7 – Carl Barriteau, Trinidadian clarinetist (died 1998).
- 10 – Larry Adler, American harmonica player (died 2001).
- 21 – Tommy Stevenson, American trumpeter (died 1944).

March

- 1 – Barrett Deems, American drummer (died 1998).
- 7 – Lee Young, American drummer and singer (died 2008).
- 13 – Bob Haggart, American upright bassist, composer, and arranger (died 1998).
- 22 – Sonny Burke, American arranger, composer, big band leader and producer, Duke Ambassadors (died 1980).

April

- 7 – Ralph Flanagan, American pianist, composer, and arranger (died 1995).
- 24 – Ray Leatherwood, American upright bassist (died 1996).

May

- 26
  - Shorty Baker, American trumpeter (died 1966).
  - Ziggy Elman, American trumpeter (died 1968).

June

- 15 – Rudy Bruder, Belgian pianist and organist (died unknown date).
- 17 – Sing Miller, American pianist (died 1990).

July

- 1 – Earle Warren American alto saxophonist and singer (died 1995).
- 2 – Carlos Vidal Bolado, American conga drum musician (died 1996).
- 8 – Billy Eckstine, American singer, and band leader (died 1993).
- 26 – Erskine Hawkins, American trumpeter, and big band leader (died 1993).

August

- 16 – Edythe Wright, American singer (died 1965).
- 18 – Irmgard Österwall, Swedish singer (died 1980).
- 25 – Shizuko Kasagi, Japanese singer (died 1985).

September

- 4 – Tommy McQuater, British trumpeter (died 2008).
- 7 – Graeme Bell, Australian pianist, composer and band leader (died 2012).
- 8 – Dave Bowman, American pianist (died 1964).
- 10 – Ken Snakehips Johnson, American band leader and dancer, originally from British Guiana (died 1941).
- 13 – Leonard Feather, British pianist, composer, and producer (died 1994).
- 21 – Slam Stewart, American upright bassist (died 1987).
- 25 – Dave Wilkins, Barbadian trumpeter (died 1990).

October

- 4 – Marvin Ash, American pianist (died 1974).
- 10 – King Perry, American saxophonist, clarinetist, arranger, and bandleader (died 1990).

November

- 16 – Roberto Nicolosi, Italian upright bassist and leader (died 1989).
- 20 – Skeeter Best, American guitarist (died 1985).
- 28 – Cecil Brower, American violinist (died 1965).
- 29 – Hal McIntyre, American saxophonist, clarinetist, and bandleader (died 1959).

December

- 1 – Josef Taussig, Czech trombonist and journalist (died 1945).
- 3 – Corky Cornelius, American trumpeter (died 1943).
- 31 – Cedric Haywood, American pianist (died 1969).

Unknown date

- Eyvin Andersen, Danish organist, violinist, and composer (died 1968).
