= 1918 in jazz =

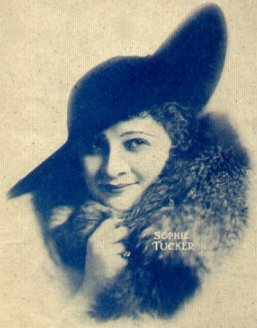
- Vaudeville performer Sophie Tucker popularized the jazz standards "Some of These Days", "I Ain't Got Nobody" and "After You've Gone".
- Decade: Pre-1920 in jazz
- Music: 1918 in music
- Standards: List of pre-1920 jazz standards
- See also: 1917 in jazz – 1919 in jazz

This is a timeline documenting events of Jazz in the year 1918.

Births in that year included Wild Bill Davis and Cachao López.

== Standards ==
- In 1918 the standard "After You've Gone" was released.

== Births ==
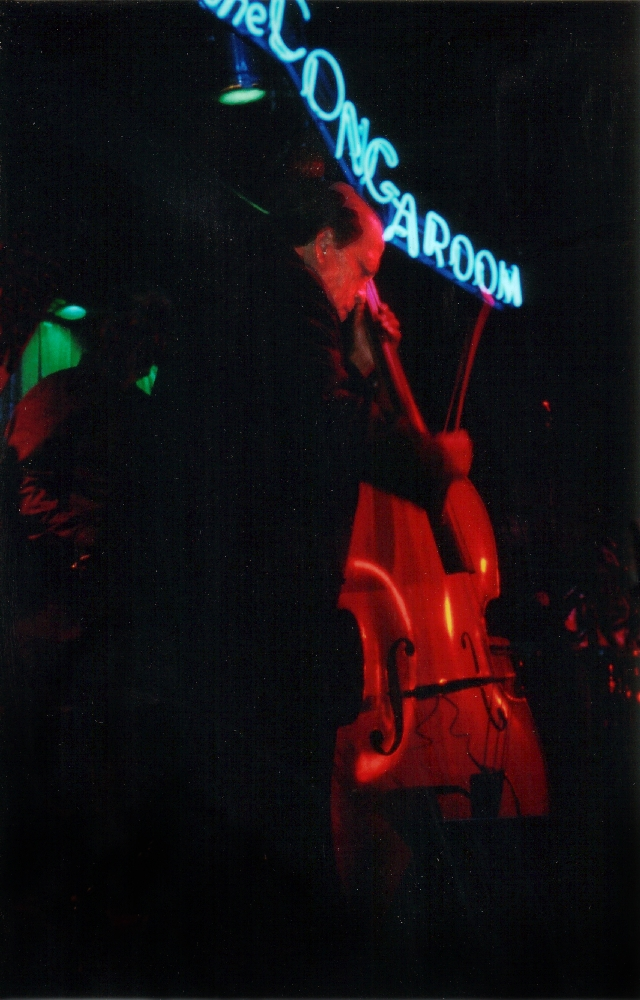
Cachao López around 2000

January

- 1 – Nat Jaffe, American pianist (died 1945).
- 5 – Dal Richards, American big-band leader (died 2015).
- 9 – Betty Roché, American singer (died 1999).
- 10 – Aaron Bridgers, African-American pianist (died 2003).
- 17 – Irene Daye, American singer (died 1974).
- 27 – Elmore James, American guitarist (died 1963).

February

- 5 – Eraldo Volonté, Italian saxophonist and bandleader (died 2003).
- 18 – Mariano Mores, Argentine tango composer and pianist (died 2016).
- 20 – Phil Moore, American pianist (died 1987).
- 23 – Money Johnson, American trumpeter (died 1978).
- 25 – George Desmond Hodnett, Irish musician, songwriter, and critic (died 1990).

March

- 6 – Howard McGhee, American trumpeter (died 1987).
- 14 – Verne Byers, American band leader and bassist (died 2008).
- 18 – Sam Donahue, American tenor saxophonist and trumpeter (died 1974).
- 20 – Marian McPartland, British-born pianist, composer and arranger (died 2013).
- 21 – Charles Thompson, American pianist, organist and arranger (died 2016).
- 26 – Andy Hamilton, Jamaican-born British saxophonist (died 2012).
- 29 – Pearl Bailey, American actress and singer (died 1990).

April

- 7 – Peanuts Hucko, American clarinetist (died 2003).
- 18 – Tony Mottola, American guitarist (died 2004).

May

- 14 – Sammy Lowe, American trumpeter and arranger (died 1993).

June

- 11 – Irene Higginbotham, African-American songwriter and concert pianist (died 1988).
- 14 – John Simmons, American bassist (died 1979).

July

- 12 – Rusty Dedrick, American trumpeter (died 2009).
- 31 – Hank Jones, American pianist and composer (died 2010).

August

- 3 – Eddie Jefferson, American vocalist and lyricist (died 1979).
- 8 – Knocky Parker, American pianist (died 1986).
- 10 – Arnett Cobb, American tenor saxophonist (died 1989).
- 17 – Ike Quebec, American tenor saxophonist (died 1963).
- 19 – Jimmy Rowles, American pianist, vocalist and composer (died 1996).
- 23 – Kjeld Bonfils, Danish pianist and vibraphone player (died 1984).
- 25 – Freddie Kohlman, American drummer vocalist, and bandleader (died 1990).

September

- 4 – Gerald Wilson, American trumpeter, big-band leader, and composer (died 2014).
- 8 – Bill Graham, American saxophonist (died 1975).
- 12 – Waldren Joseph, American trombonist (died 2004).
- 14 – Cachao López, Cuban mambo musician, bassist and composer (died 2008).
- 17 – Hubert Rostaing, American clarinetist and tenor saxophonist (died 1990).
- 21 – Tommy Potter, American upright bassist (died 1988).

October

- 5 – Jimmy Blanton, American upright bassist (died 1942).
- 9 – Bebo Valdés, Cuban pianist, bandleader, composer, and arranger (died 2013).
- 10 – Bobby Byrne, American bandleader, trombonist, and music executive (died 2006).
- 18 – Bobby Troup, American pianist and songwriter (died 1999).
- 25 – Chubby Jackson, American upright bassist and bandleader (died 2003).

November

- 11 – Louise Tobin, American singer (died 2022).
- 24 – Wild Bill Davis, American jazz pianist, organist, and arranger (died 1995).

December

- 2 – Milton DeLugg, American accordionist and composer (died 2015).
- 12 – Joe Williams, American vocalist (died 1999).
- 21 – Panama Francis, American drummer (died 2001).
- 24 – Dave Bartholomew, American trumpeter, band leader, composer and arranger (died 2019).
- 25 – Eddie Safranski, American upright bassist (died 1974).
- 26 – Butch Ballard, American drummer (died 2011).
- 30 – Jimmy Jones, American pianist (died 1982).

Unknown date

- Joan C. Edwards, American singer (died 2006).
