= 1996 in jazz =

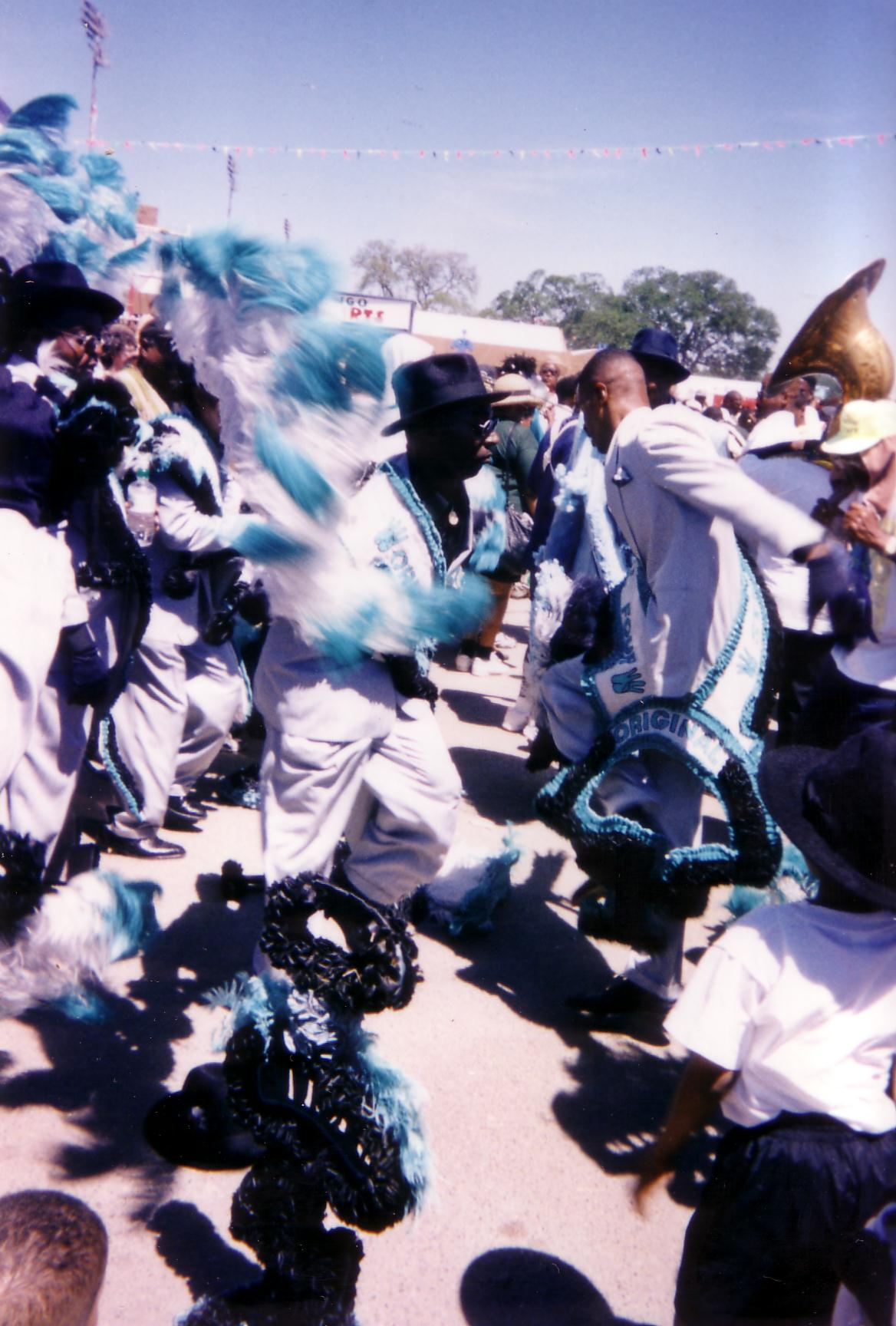
- Original Brass Band, New Orleans Jazz Fest, 1996
- Decade: 1990s in jazz
- Music: 1996 in music
- Standards: List of post-1950 jazz standards
- See also: 1995 in jazz – 1997 in jazz

This is a timeline documenting events of Jazz in the year 1996.

== Events ==
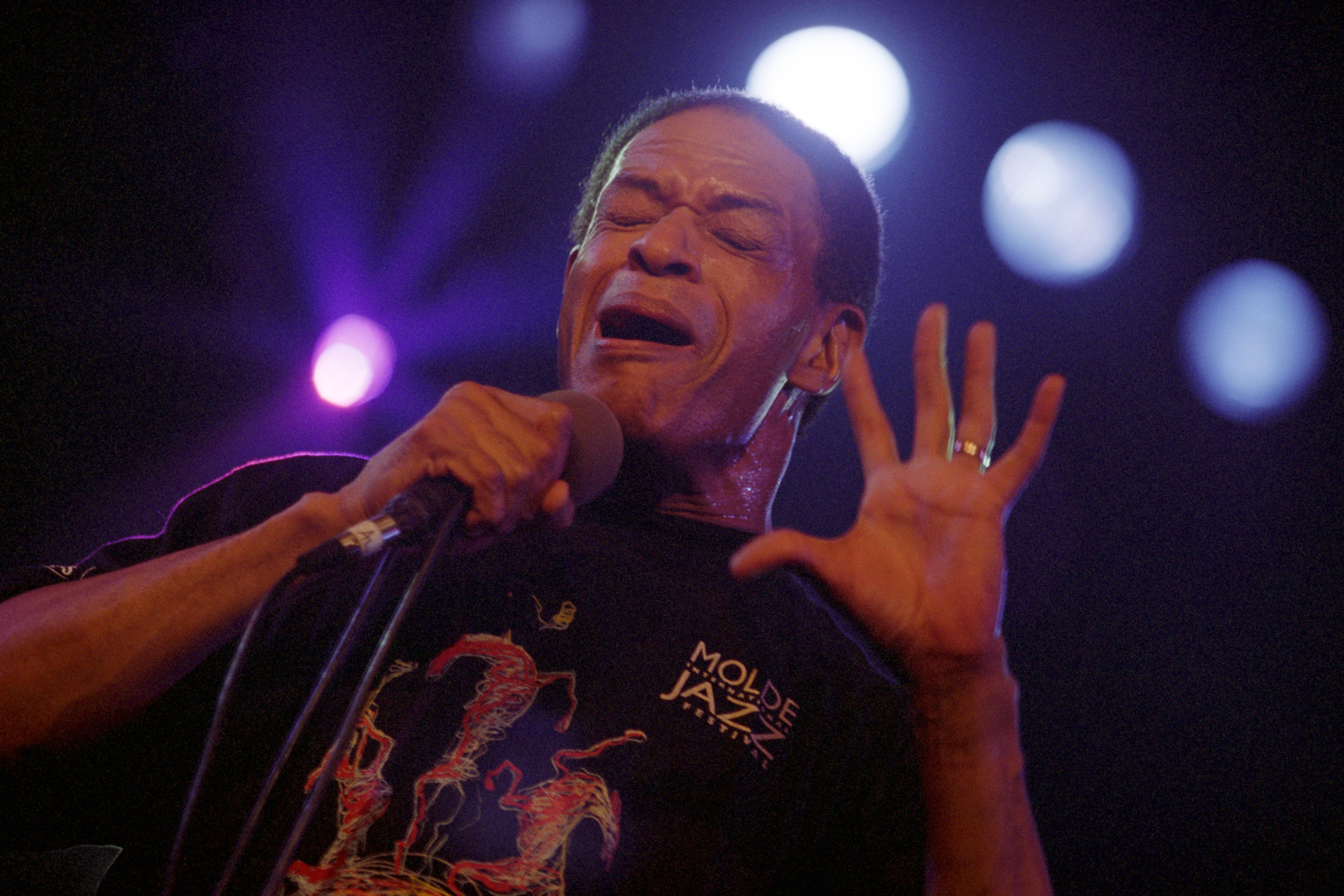
Al Jarreau at the 1996 Moldejazz in Norway. (Photo by Stig Ove Voll)

=== March ===
- 29 – The 23rd Vossajazz started in Vossavangen, Norway (March 29 – 31).

=== May ===
- 22 – The 24th Nattjazz started in Bergen, Norway (May 22 – June 2).
- 24 – The 25th Moers Festival started in Moers, Germany (May 24 – 27).

=== June ===
- 27 – The 17th Montreal International Jazz Festival started in Canada (June 27 – July 7).
- 28 – The 6th Jazz Fest Wien started in Wien, Austria (June 28 – July 13).

=== July ===
- 5 – The 30th Montreux Jazz Festival started in Switzerland (July 5 – 20).
- 12
  - The 21st North Sea Jazz Festival started in The Hague, Netherlands (July 12 – 14).
  - The 31st Pori Jazz Festival started in Finland (July 12 – 21).
- 15 – The 37th Moldejazz started in Molde, Norway (July 15 – 20).
- 18 – The 49th Nice Jazz Festival started in France (July 18 – 20).
- 21 – The 31st San Sebastian Jazz Festival started in San Sebastian, Spain (July 22 – 27).

=== August ===
- 9 – The 13th Brecon Jazz Festival started in Brecon, Wales (August 9 – 11).

=== September ===
- 19 – The 39th Monterey Jazz Festival started in Monterey, California (September 19 – 21).

== Album releases ==
Month	Day	Album	Artist	Label	Notes	Ref.
January	1	Moving In	Chris Potter	Concord		
January	8	Notes of Life	Hugh Masekela	Columbia		
October	15	Shack-man	Medeski Martin & Wood	Rykodisc		
August
September	20	Freedom in the Groove	Joshua Redman	Warner Bros.		
September	30	Wisdom of Uncertainty	David S. Ware	AUM Fidelity		

- Matthew Shipp: By the Law of Music
- Guillermo Gregorio: Approximately
- Ivo Perelman: Seeds, Visions and Counterpoint
- Michael Formanek: Nature of the Beast
- David S. Ware: Wisdom of Uncertainty
- Maria Schneider: Coming About
- Zeena Parkins: Mouth=Maul=Betrayer
- Kenny Wheeler: Siren's Song
- Gerry Hemingway: Perfect World
- Ivo Perelman: Sound Hierarchy
- Bob Neill: Triptycal
- Branford Marsalis: The Dark Keys
- Carol Sloane: The Songs Sinatra Sang
- Henry Threadgill: Where's Your Cup?
- Evan Parker: Toward the Margins
- Pat Metheny Group: Quartet
- John Scofield: Quiet
- Fred Anderson: Birdhouse
- David S. Ware: Oblations and Blessings
- David S. Ware: DAO
- David S. Ware: Godspelized
- William Parker: Compassion Seizes Bed-Stuy
- Eliane Elias: The Three Americas
- Charlie Haden: Now Is the Hour

== Deaths ==
January

- 2 – Viatcheslav Nazarov, American trombonist, pianist and vocalist (born 1952).
- 5 – Gus Bivona, American reedist (born 1915).
- 11 – Ike Isaacs, Burmese-English guitarist (born 1919).
- 13 – Morty Corb, American upright bassist (born 1917).
- 20 – Gerry Mulligan, American saxophonist, and clarinetist (born 1927).
- 28 – Pauline Braddy, African-American drummer, International Sweethearts of Rhythm (born 1922).
- 29 – Ray Leatherwood, American upright bassist (born 1914).

February

- 7 – Tiny Winters, English bassist and vocalist (born 1909).
- 8 – Mercer Ellington, American trumpeter, composer, and arranger (born 1919).
- 12 – Alan Dawson, American drummer (born 1929).

March

- 5 – Herb Hall, American clarinetist and saxophonist (born 1907).
- 27 – Howard Wyeth, American drummer and pianist

May

- 1 – Billy Byers, American trombonist and arranger (born 1927).
- 25 – Barney Wilen, American saxophonist and composer (born 1937).
- 27 – Pud Brown, American reedist (born 1917).
- 28 – Jimmy Rowles, American pianist, vocalist, and composer (born 1918).

June

- 1 – Don Grolnick, American pianist and composer (born 1947).
- 6 – Norma Teagarden, American pianist (born 1911).
- 10 – Frankie Sakai, Japanese comedian, actor, and musician (born 1929).
- 15 – Ella Fitzgerald, American vocalist (born 1917).
- 16 – Gil Cuppini, Italian drummer and bandleader (born 1924).

July

- 3 – Pim Jacobs, American trumpeter (born 1934).
- 17 – Amancio D'Silva, Indian guitarist and composer (born 1936).

August

- 6 – Bobby Enriquez, Filipino pianist (born 1943).
- 24 – Carlos Vidal Bolado, American conga drum musician (born 1914).
- 25 – Fred Adison, French vocalist, drummer, and bandleader (born 1908).
- 31 – Milt Larkin, American trumpeter and bandleader (born 1910).

September

- 20 – Paul Weston, American pianist, arranger, composer, and conductor (born 1912).

October

- 11 – Johnny Costa, American pianist (born 1922).

November

- 2 – Eva Cassidy, American vocalist and guitarist (born 1963).
- 4 – Ray Linn, American trumpeter (born 1920).
- 5 – Eddie Harris, American saxophonist (born 1934).
- 7
  - Carmell Jones, American trumpet player (born 1936).
  - Kid Sheik, American trumpeter (born 1908).
- 12 – Alan Littlejohn, American trumpeter, flugelhornist, and bandleader (born 1928).
- 13 – Bill Doggett, American pianist and organist (born 1916).
- 23 – Art Porter Jr., American saxophonist (born 1961).

December

- 19 – Bobby Cole, American singer and pianist (born 1932).
- 23 – Ronnie Scott, English tenor saxophonist and jazz club owner (born 1927).
- 26 – Oscar Valdambrini, Italian jazz trumpeter (born 1924).

== Births ==
February

- 2 – Dionne Bromfield, English singer and songwriter.
- 4 – Connie Han, American pianist and composer.

September

- 8 – Alexander Bone, English saxophonist, pianist, producer, and composer.

== See also ==
- 1990s in jazz
- List of years in jazz
- 1996 in music
