= 1989 in jazz =

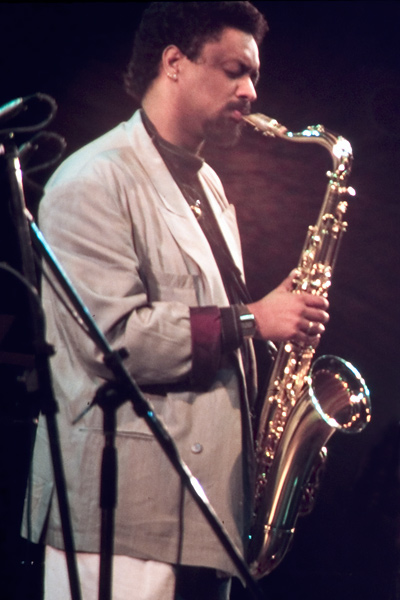
- Chico Freeman at a Concert at the North Sea Jazz Festival 1989 with "The Leaders".
- Decade: 1980s in jazz
- Music: 1989 in music
- Standards: List of post-1950 jazz standards
- See also: 1988 in jazz – 1990 in jazz

This is a timeline documenting events of Jazz in the year 1989.

== Events ==
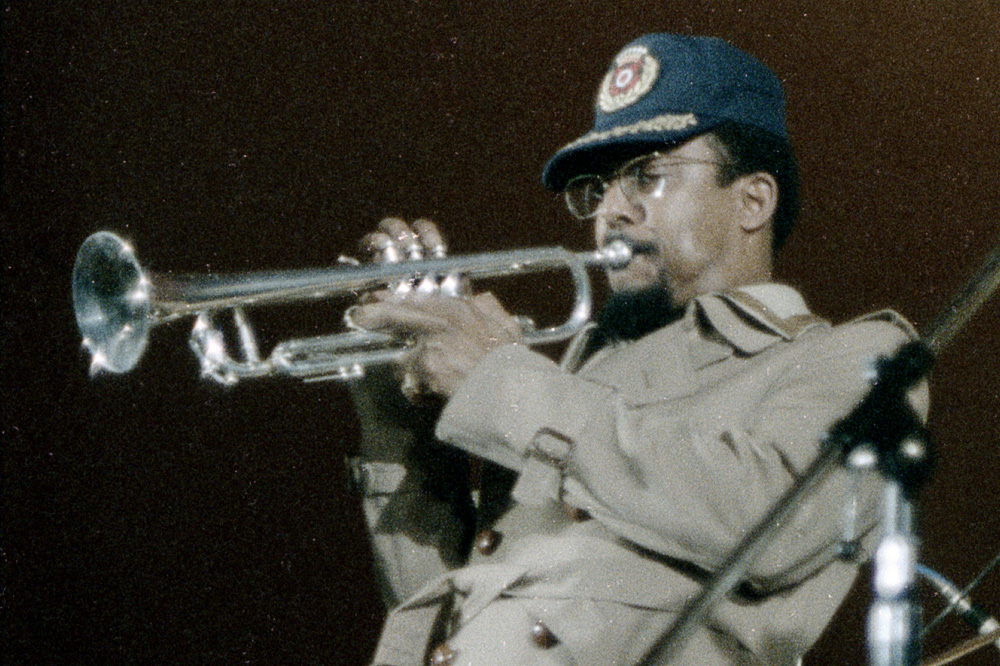
Lester Bowie at moers festival 1978.

=== February ===
- 27 – Woody Shaw was struck by a subway car in Brooklyn, NY, which severed his left arm. By the late 1980s Shaw was suffering from an incurable degenerative eye disease and was losing his eyesight. Details of the accident are unclear.

=== March ===
- 17 – The 16th Vossajazz started in Vossavangen, Norway (March 17 – 19).

=== May ===
- 12 – The 18th Moers Festival (May 12 – 15).
- 24 – The 17th Nattjazz started in Bergen, Norway (May 24 – June 7).

=== June ===
- 2 – The 12th Atlanta Jazz Festival started in Atlanta, Georgia (June 2 – 4, July 7 – 9, August 4 – 6).

=== July ===
- 1 – The 33rd Newport Jazz Festival started in Newport, Rhode Island (July 1 – 3).
- 6 – The 23rd Montreux Jazz Festival started in Montreux, Switzerland (July 6 – 21).
- 14 – The 14th North Sea Jazz Festival started in The Hague, Netherlands (July 14 – 16).
- 28 – The 12th Jazz in Marciac started in France (July 28 – August 17).

=== August ===
- 17 – The 6th Brecon Jazz Festival started in Brecon, Wales (April 17 – 19).

=== September ===
- 15 – The 32nd Monterey Jazz Festival started in Monterey, California (September 15 – 17).

== Album releases ==
- Abdullah Ibrahim: Blues for a Hip King
- Abdullah Ibrahim: African River
- Marty Ehrlich: Traveller's Tale
- Tim Berne: Fractured Fairy Tales
- Joe Maneri: Kalavinka
- Henry Threadgill: Rag, Bush and All
- 16-17: When All Else Fails
- Joe Lovano: Worlds
- Nimal: Nimal
- John Oswald: Plunderphonics
- Michael Shrieve: Stiletto
- Dave Holland: Extensions
- Andrew Hill: Eternal Spirit
- Christy Doran: Phoenix
- Henry Kaiser: Re-Marrying For Money
- Michael Shrieve: Big Picture
- Muhal Richard Abrams: Hearinga Suite
- Don Pullen: Song Everlasting
- Fred Hersh: Heartsongs
- Geri Allen: Twylight
- Leni Stern: Closer to the Light
- Ganelin Trio: Cantabile
- Marty Fogel: Many Bobbing Heads
- London Jazz Composers Orchestra:Harmos
- Montreaux: Let Them Say
- No Safety: This Lost Leg
- Carol Sloane: Love You Madly
- John Carter: Shadows on a Wall
- Ralph Peterson: Triangular
- Ray Anderson: Blues Bred
- King Ubu Orchestru: Binaurality
- Evan Parker: Conic Sections
- Dewey Redman: Living on the Edge
- Charles Earland: Third Degree Burn
- John Scofield: Time on My Hands
- Roy Hargrove: Diamond in the Rough
- Tom Harrell: Sail Away
- Tommy Flanagan: Jazz Poet
- Larry Carlton: On Solid Ground
- Neal Schon:Late Nite
- Egberto Gismonti: Dança Dos Escravos
- Chick Corea Akoustic Band: Chick Corea Akoustic Band
- Joe Sample: Spellbound
- Eliane Elias: So Far So Close
- Pat Metheny Group: Letter From Home
- Hugh Masekela: Uptownship

== Deaths ==
February

- 26 – Roy Eldridge, American trumpeter (born 1911).

March

- 24 – Arnett Cobb, American tenor saxophonist (born 1918).

April

- 4 – Roberto Nicolosi, Italian upright bassist and leader (born 1914).
- 12 – Herbert Mills, American singer, Mills Brothers (born 1912).

May

- 10 – Woody Shaw, American trumpeter (kidney failure) (born 1944).
- 26 – Phineas Newborn, Jr., American pianist (born 1931).

July

- 15 – Will Bradley, American trombonist and bandleader (born 1912).

October

- 19 – Alan Murphy, English guitarist (born 1953).

November

- 5 – Lu Watters, American trumpeter and band leader, Yerba Buena Jazz Band (born 1911).
- 9 – Kenny Hagood, American singer (born 1926).
- 18 – Freddie Waits, American drummer (born 1943).

December

- 28 – Fred Lange-Nielsen, Norwegian bassist and vocalist (born 1919).

== Births ==
January

- 4 – Trond Bersu, Norwegian drummer and vocalist.

April

- 5 – Kris Bowers, American composer and pianist.

May

- 8 – Christian Skår Winther, Norwegian guitarist.
- 22 – Christian Sands, American pianist and composer.
- 24 – Francesco Cafiso, Italian alto saxophonist.

June

- 6 – Kristoffer Eikrem, Norwegian trumpeter, composer and photographer.

July

- 14 – Isaiah Sharkey, American guitarist and singer.

August

- 28 – Cécile McLorin Salvant, American singer.

October

- 27 – Jakob Terjesønn Rypdal, Norwegian guitarist.

November

- 2 – Isfar Sarabski, Azerbaijani pianist and composer.
- 20 – Magnus Skavhaug Nergaard, Norwegian upright bassist.

December

- 11 – KeyLiza or Kesita Elizabeth Massamba, German singer, dancer, DJ, composer and beatmaker.

Unknown date

- James Mainwaring, English composer, saxophonist, and bandleader.

== See also ==
- 1980s in jazz
- List of years in jazz
- 1989 in music
