= Diknu Schneeberger =

Austrian jazz guitarist

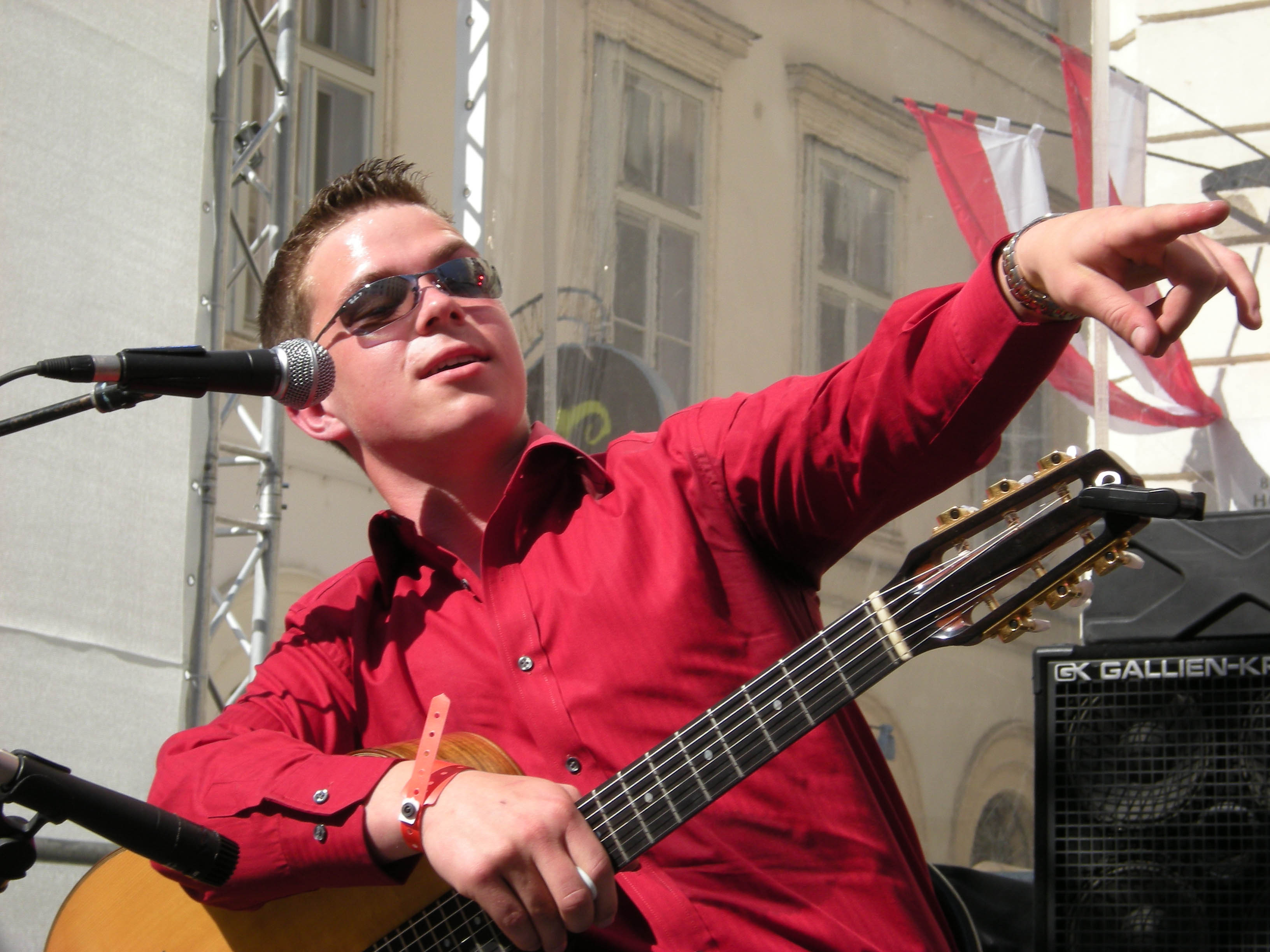
Diknu Schneeberger, Wien 2009.

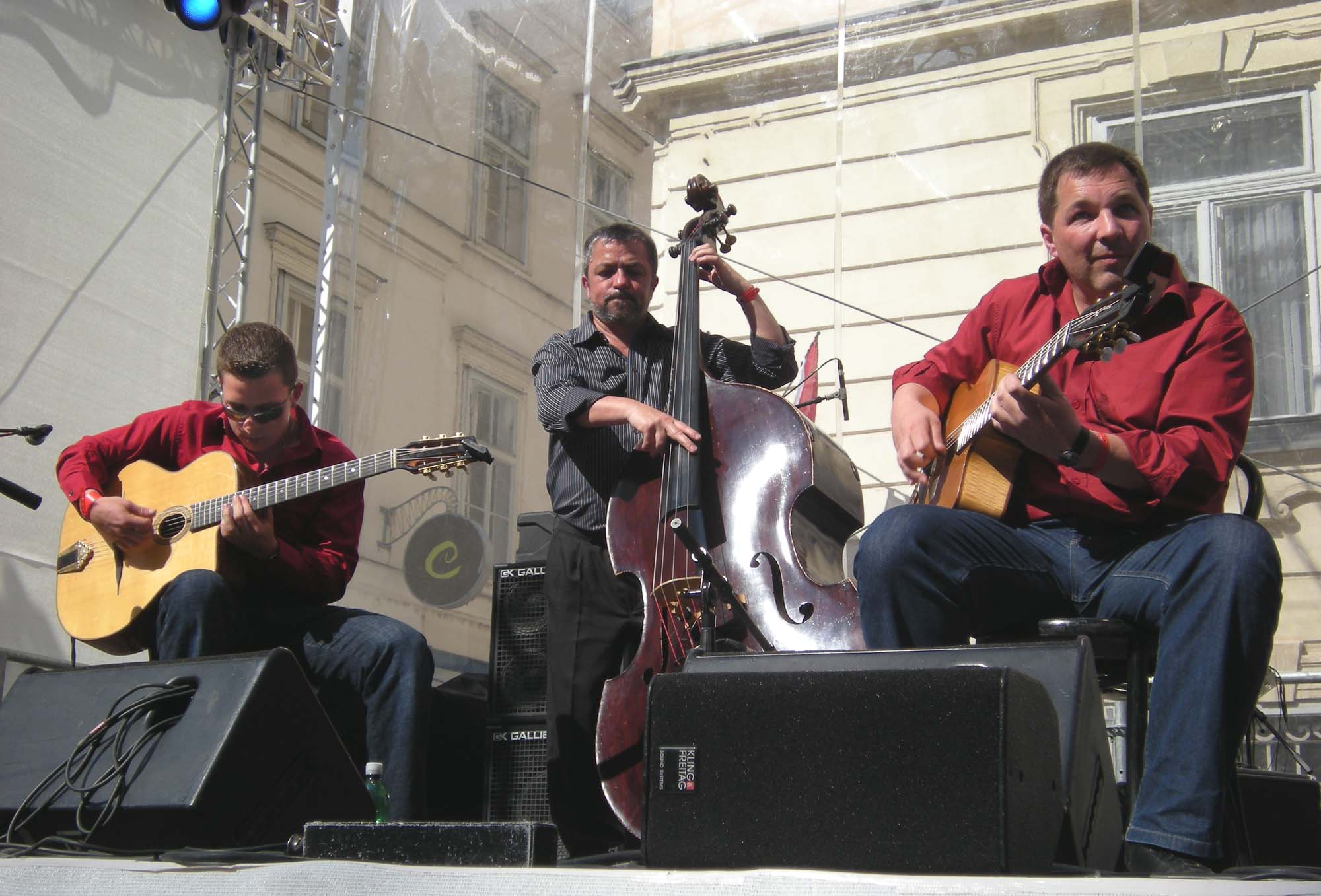
Diknu Schneeberger Trio, Wien 2009. V.l.: Diknu, Joschi Schneebert, Martin Spitzer

Diknu Schneeberger (born 17 January 1990 in Vienna) is an Austrian jazz guitarist in the tradition of gypsy jazz. In 2006 he received the Hans Koller Prize as Talent of the Year.

== Biography ==
Schneeberger is the son of the upright bassist Joschi Schneeberger. He had his first public appearance in June 2004 and in October the same year he released his first album with the Joschi Schneeberger Quintett. He first started guitar studies with Striglo Stöger, later with Martin Spitzer, now also a guitarist in Diknu Schneeberger Trio. His father Joschi Schneeberger is bassist in the trio.

Schneeberger also studied jazz guitar at the Vienna Conservatory.

== Discography ==
Joschi Schneeberger Quintett

- Rani (2004)

Diknu Schneeberger Trio

- Rubina (2007)
- The Spirit of Django (2010)
- Friends (2012)
- Feuerlicht (2018)
- Live From PORGY & BESS (2020)

Diknu Schneeberger

- Gypsy Rebel (2019)
