= Judy Chamberlain =

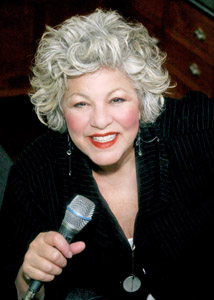
- Jazz singer Judy Chamberlain in 2008

Background information
- Born: September 26, 1944 (age 82); New York City, New York U.S.
- Genre: Vocal jazz
- Occupation: Singer
- Years active: 1957–present
- Label: JazzBaby
- Website: www.judychamberlain.com

Judy Chamberlain (born September 26, 1944 in New York City) is an American jazz singer, bandleader and journalist known for her extensive repertoire, estimated at four thousand songs from the Great American Songbook. The Los Angeles Times jazz critic Don Heckman has called Judy, "remarkably eclectic and versatile... always an intriguing interpreter of the standards" and has written that she is "almost guaranteed to know your favorite love song, no matter how obscure."

Chamberlain also wrote restaurant reviews, society and editorial columns for the Orange Coast Daily Pilot in Costa Mesa, reviewed restaurants for the Torrance, California Daily Breeze, the Los Angeles Times Calendar Live and Cox Interactive Media's LAInsider.com and hosted a restaurant interview show, Dining With Judy on K-OCEAN 103.1 FM (now KDLE) in Newport Beach, California and Savoire Fare on the Orange County Newschannel.
