= 1987 in jazz =

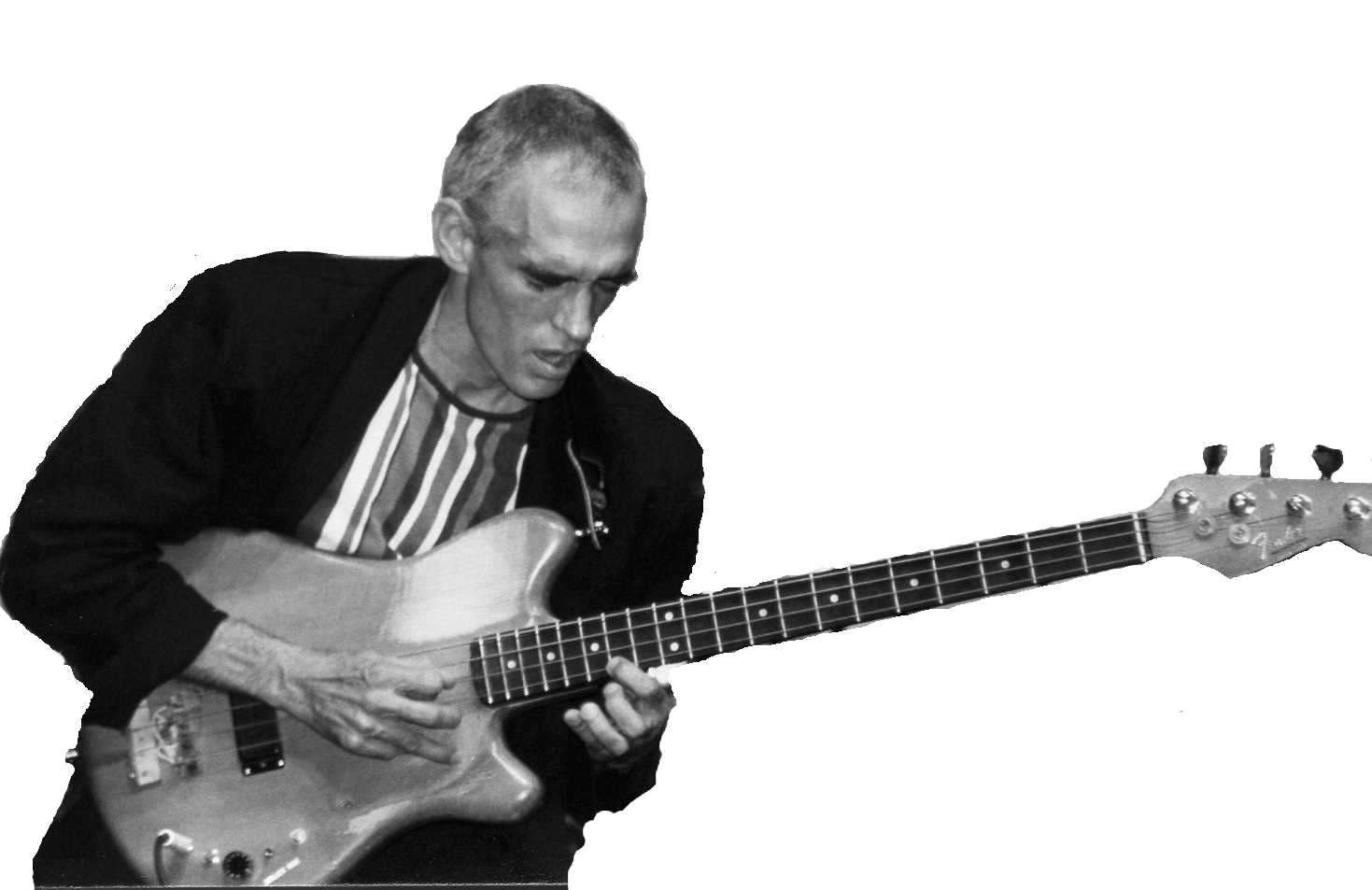
- Steve Swallow at the Münster Jazz Festival 1987
- Decade: 1980s in jazz
- Music: 1987 in music
- Standards: List of post-1950 jazz standards
- See also: 1986 in jazz – 1988 in jazz

This is a timeline documenting events of Jazz in the year 1987.

== Events ==
=== April ===
- 10 – The 14th Vossajazz started in Vossavangen, Norway (April 10 – 12).

=== May ===
- 20 – The 15th Nattjazz started in Bergen, Norway (May 20 – June 3).

=== June ===
- 5 – The 16th Moers Festival started in Moers, Germany (June 5 – 8).
- 26 – The 8th Montreal International Jazz Festival started in Montreal, Quebec, Canada (June 26 – July 6).

=== July ===
- 2 – The 21st Montreux Jazz Festival started in Montreux, Switzerland (July 2 – 19).
- 10 – The 12th North Sea Jazz Festival started in The Hague, Netherlands (July 10 – 12).

=== August ===
- 21 – The 4th Brecon Jazz Festival started in Brecon, Wales (April 21 – 23).

=== September ===
- 15 – The 30th Monterey Jazz Festival started in Monterey, California (September 15 – 17).

== Album releases ==
- Henry Threadgill: Easily Slip Into Another World
- Anthony Davis: Undine
- Steve Lacy: Momentum
- John Zorn: Spillane
- Sun Ra Arkestra: Reflections in Blue
- Sun Ra Arkestra: Hours After
- Hank Roberts: Black Pastels
- Marilyn Crispell: Labyrinths
- Guy Klucevsek: Scenes From A Mirage
- David Torn: Cloud About Mercury
- Bobby Previte: Dull Bang, Gushing Sound, Human Shriek
- Tim Berne: Sanctified Dreams
- Borbetomagus: Fish That Sparkling Bubble
- Marty Ehrlich: Pliant Plaint
- Tim Berne: Fulton Street Maul
- Benny Carter: Central City Sketches
- Bobby Previte: Pushing The Envelope
- Phil Woods: Bouquet
- Danny Gottlieb: Aquamarine
- Dave Holland: The Razor's Edge
- Elements: Illumination
- Henry Kaiser: Crazy Backwards Alphabet
- Henry Kaiser: Devil In The Drain
- Kenny Wheeler: Flutter By, Butterfly
- Mark Helias: The Current Set
- Michael Brecker: Michael Brecker
- Montreux: Sign Language
- Sonny Sharrock: Seize the Rainbow
- Mulgrew Miller: Wingspan
- Neil Swainson: 49th Parallel
- Earthworks: Earthworks
- Chick Corea Elektric Band: Light Years
- Michael Franks: The Camera Never Lies
- Eliane Elias: Cross Currents
- Hugh Masekela: Tomorrow

== Deaths ==
January

- 14 – Alton Purnell, American pianist (born 1911).
- 16 – Robert De Kers, Belgian trumpeter and bandleader (born 1906).

February

- 2
  - Alfred Lion, German-American record executive, Blue Note Records (born 1908).
  - Spike Hughes, British upright bassist, composer, and music journalist (born 1908).

March

- 1 – Freddie Green, American guitarist (born 1911).
- 6 – Eddie Durham, American guitarist, trombonist, composer, and arranger (born 1906).

April

- 2 – Buddy Rich, American drummer and bandleader (born 1917).
- 7 – Maxine Sullivan, American singer (born 1911).

May

- 4 — Wilbur Little, African-American bassist (born 1928).
- 12 – Victor Feldman, English pianist and percussionist (born 1934).

July

- 17 – Howard McGhee, American trumpeter (born 1918).

September

- 21 – Jaco Pastorius, American bass guitarist (born 1951).

October

- 15 – Pete Carpenter, American trombonist (born 1914).
- 29 – Woody Herman, American clarinetist, alto and soprano saxophonist, singer, and big band leader (born 1913).

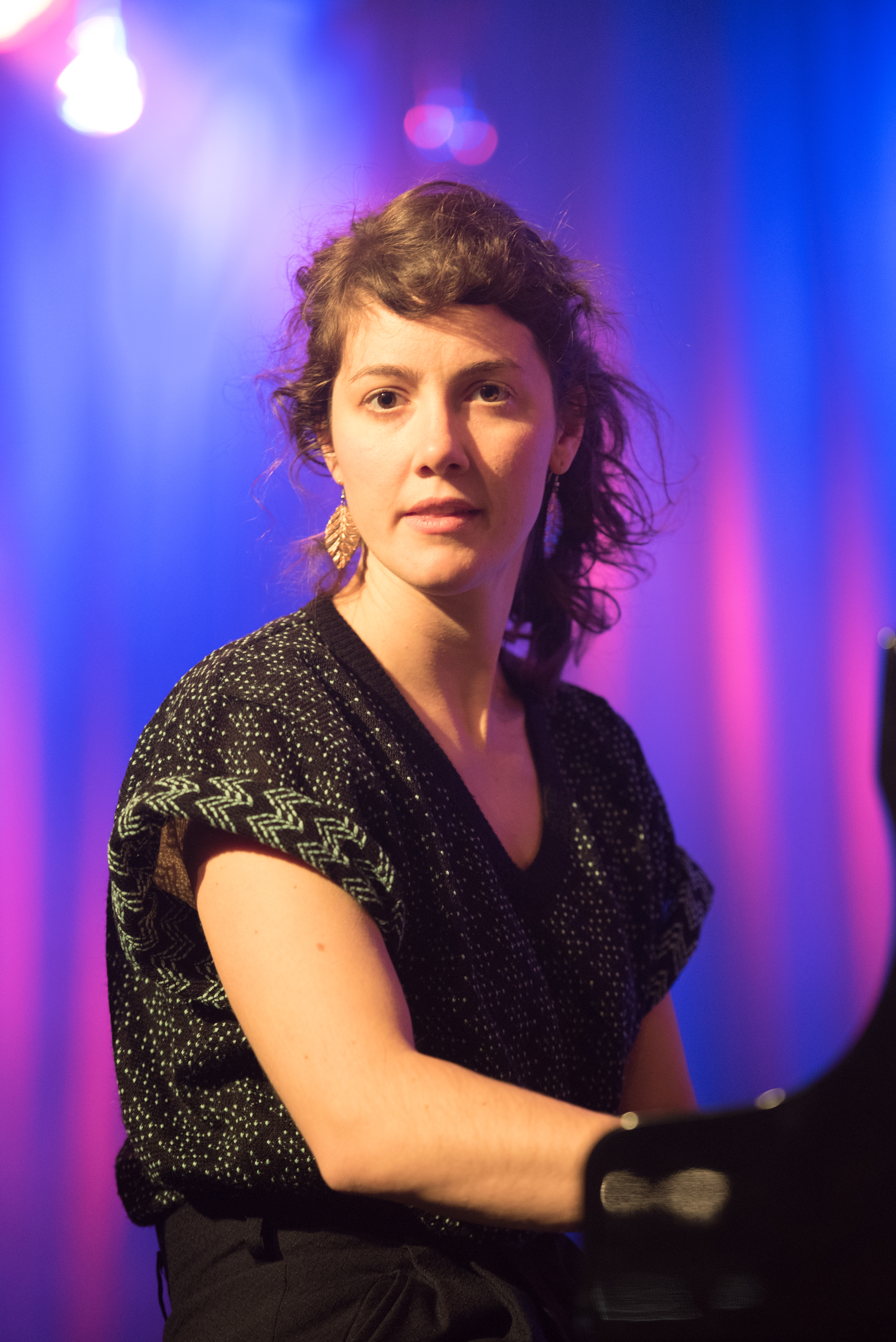
Kaja Draksler at the 2016 Moers Festival.

December

- 10 – Slam Stewart, American upright bassist (born 1914).
- 18 – Warne Marsh, American tenor saxophonist (born 1927).

== Births ==
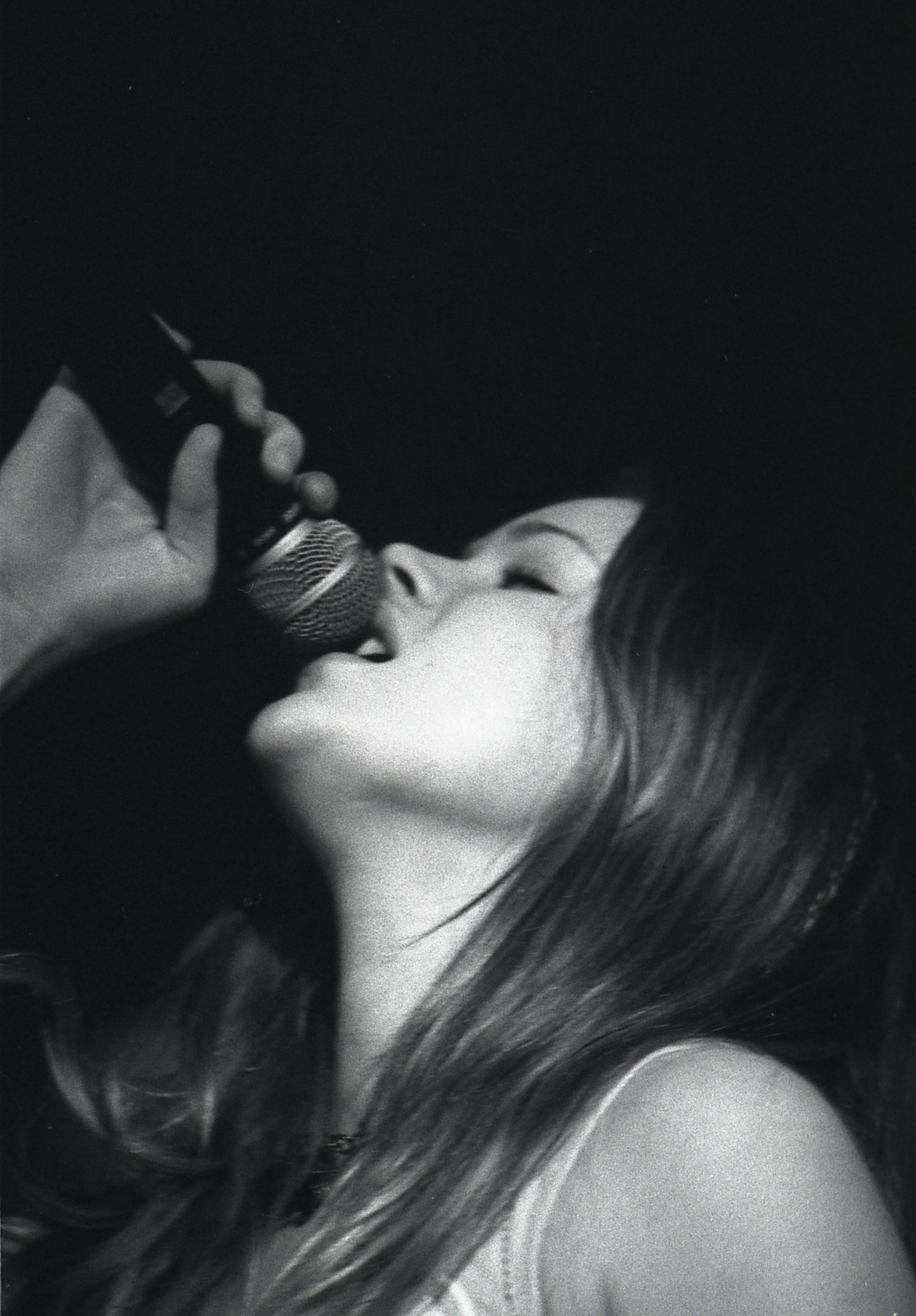
Joss Stone Salumeria della Musica 2005.

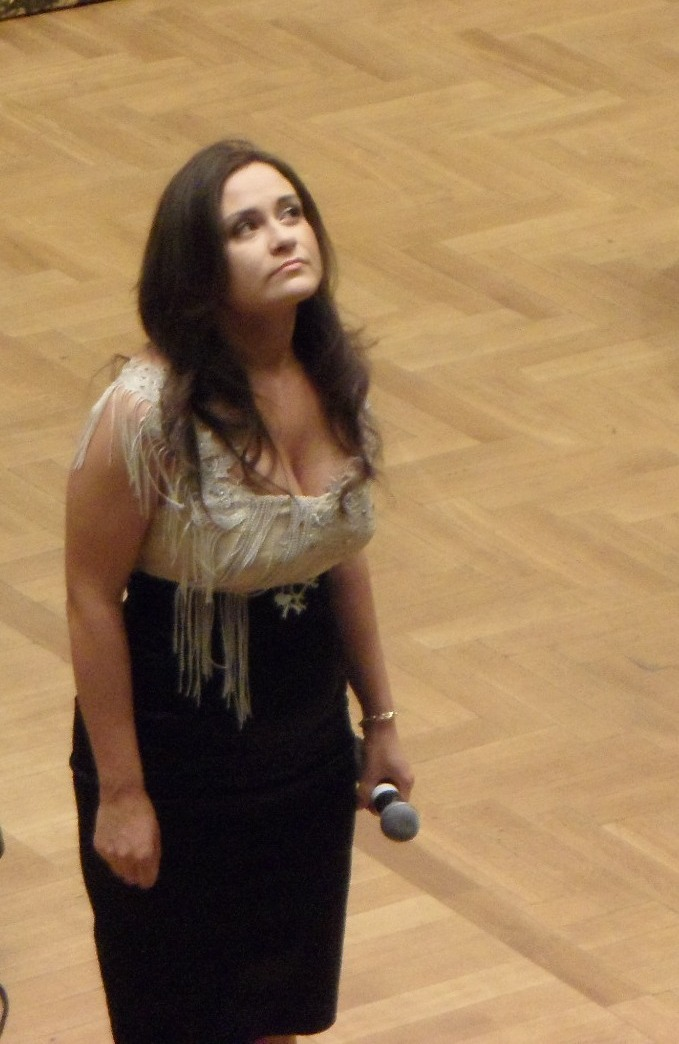
Evelina Sašenko 2011.

January

- 28 – Eldar Djangirov, American pianist.

February

- 5 – Shai Maestro, Israeli pianist.
- 6 – Kaja Draksler, Slovenian pianist and composer.
- 15 – Trygve Waldemar Fiske, Norwegian upright bassist.
- 27 – Cory Henry, American organist, pianist, and music producer.

March

- 13 – Harald Lassen, Norwegian saxophonist and pianist.
- 19 – Thana Alexa, Croatian-American vocalist and composer.

April

- 11 – Joss Stone, English singer, songwriter and actress.
- 15 – Marquis Hill, American trumpeter, composer and bandleader.
- 26 – Kim-Erik Pedersen, Norwegian saxophonist.
- 30 – August Rosenbaum, Danish pianist, composer, and arranger

May

- 10 – Typh Barrow, Belgian singer, songwriter, composer and pianist.

July

- 17 – Tigran Hamasyan, Armenian pianist and composer.
- 26 – Evelina Sašenko, Lithuanian singer of Polish-Ukrainian descent.

September

- 11 – Bjørn Marius Hegge, Norwegian upright bassist and composer, Hegge.
- 18 – Luísa Sobral, Portuguese singer and songwriter.

October

- 12 – Bjørnar Kaldefoss Tveite, Norwegian upright bassist (Morning Has Occurred).
- 25 – André Drage, Norwegian drummer and composer.

November

- 12 – Jamison Ross, American drummer and vocalist.
- 13 – Hanna Paulsberg, Norwegian tenor saxophonist and composer.

December

- 12 – Marte Eberson, Norwegian pianist, keyboardist and composer.
- 25 – Julian Lage, American guitarist and composer.

Unknown date

- Anja Lauvdal, Norwegian pianist, keyboardist, and composer.
- Hanne Kalleberg, Norwegian singer and composer.
- Mario Tomić, Croatian guitarist, arranger, composer, and producer.
- Oscar Grönberg, Swedish-Norwegian pianist.
- Thea Hjelmeland, Norwegian singer and songwriter.

== See also ==
- 1980s in jazz
- List of years in jazz
- 1987 in music
