= Kenny Trimble =

American musician (1919–1991)

Kenneth Trimble (March 1, 1919 – May 8, 1991) was an American musician who was a member of Lawrence Welk's orchestra from 1957 to 1982. His instrument was the trombone.

Born and raised in Milwaukee, Wisconsin, Trimble taught himself the trombone at age five and later became a Wisconsin State champion trombonist. After serving in an Army band during World War II, Trimble played with various bands such as Tex Beneke, Ray Anthony and Glenn Miller prior to joining Welk in 1957. He appeared on the Welk's weekly television show and toured with the band on their live concert tours for the next twenty-five years. Trimble also sang on group numbers on the show.

Trimble's son, Jimmy, became a professional musician in his own right and also plays the trombone. Trimble's grandson Jon plays the trumpet.
