= 1990s in jazz =

In the 1990s in Jazz, jazz rap continued progressing from the late 1980s and early 1990s, and incorporated jazz influence into hip hop. In 1988, Gang Starr released the debut single "Words I Manifest", sampling Dizzy Gillespie's 1962 "A Night in Tunisia", and Stetsasonic released "Talkin' All That Jazz", sampling Lonnie Liston Smith. Gang Starr's debut LP, No More Mr. Nice Guy (Wild Pitch, 1989), and their track "Jazz Thing" (CBS, 1990) for the soundtrack of Mo' Better Blues, sampling Charlie Parker and Ramsey Lewis. Gang Starr also collaborated with Branford Marsalis and Terence Blanchard. Groups making up the collective known as the Native Tongues Posse tended towards jazzy releases; these include the Jungle Brothers' debut Straight Out the Jungle (Warlock, 1988) and A Tribe Called Quest's People's Instinctive Travels and the Paths of Rhythm (Jive, 1990) and The Low-End Theory (Jive, 1991).

In the 1990s and 2000s, a number of young musicians emerged, including US pianists Brad Mehldau, Jason Moran and Vijay Iyer, guitarist Kurt Rosenwinkel, vibraphonist Stefon Harris, trumpeters Roy Hargrove and Terence Blanchard, saxophonists Chris Potter and Joshua Redman, and bassist Christian McBride.

Well-established jazz musicians, such as Dave Brubeck, Wynton Marsalis, Sonny Rollins, Wayne Shorter, Jessica Williams and George Benson, continue to perform and record.

In the 1990s, punk jazz and jazzcore began to reflect the increasing awareness of elements of extreme metal (particularly thrash metal and death metal) in hardcore punk. A new style of "metallic jazzcore" was developed by Iceburn, from Salt Lake City, and Candiria, from New York City, though anticipated by Naked City and Pain Killer. This tendency also takes inspiration from jazz inflections in technical death metal, such as the work of Cynic and Atheist.

== 1990 ==
=== Album releases ===
- Ben Sidran: Cool Paradise
- Bill Frisell: Is That You?
- Bobby Previte: Empty Suits
- Butch Morris: Dust To Dust
- Charlie Haden: Dream Keeper
- Danny Gottlieb: Brooklyn Blues
- David Liebman: The Tree
- David Ware: Great Bliss, Vol. 1
- Don Pullen: Random Thoughts
- Egberto Gismondi: Infancia
- Elements: Spirit River
- Eric Reed: Soldier's Hymn
- Eliane Elias: Eliane Elias Plays Jobim
- Franz Koglmann: The Use of Memory
- Geri Allen: The Nurturer
- Gerry Hemingway: Down To The Wire
- Gerry Hemingway: Special Detail
- Hank Roberts: Birds Of Prey
- ICP Orchestra: Bospaadje Konijnehol II
- Jazz Passengers: Implement Yourself
- John Pizzarelli: My Blue Heaven
- John Zorn: Naked City
- Keith Tippett: The Journey
- Kenny Wheeler: Music for Large & Small Ensembles
- Kenny Wheeler: The Widow in the Window
- Marilyn Crispell: Overlapping Hands: Eight Segments
- Mark Helias: Attack the Future
- Marty Ehrlich: Emergency Peace
- Matthew Shipp: Circular Temple
- Michael Formanek: Wide Open Spaces
- Michael Franks: Blue Pacific
- Muhal Richard Abrams: Blu Blu Blu
- Music Revelation Ensemble: Elec Jazz
- Myra Melford: Jump
- Philip Catherine: I Remember You
- Phil Woods: All Bird's Children
- Ray Anderson: What Because
- Terence Blanchard: Terence Blanchard
- Tom Harrell: Form
- Yellowjackets: Green House

=== Deaths ===
- Art Blakey (October 11, 1919 – October 16, 1990)
- Sarah Vaughan (March 27, 1924 – April 3, 1990)
- Pearl Bailey (March 29, 1918 – August 17, 1990)
- Dexter Gordon (February 27, 1923 – April 25, 1990)
- Walter Davis Jr. (September 2, 1932 – June 2, 1990)

== 1991 ==
=== Album releases ===
- Bill Frisell: Where in the World (1991)
- Bobby Previte: Weather Clear, Track Fast (1991)
- Branford Marsalis: The Beautyful Ones Are Not Yet Born (1991)
- Chick Corea Elektric Band: Beneath the Mask (1991)
- Christy Doran: What a Band (1991)
- David Sanborn: Another Hand (1991)
- David Ware: Flight of I (1991)
- Don Byron: Tuskegee Experiments (1991)
- Don Pullen: Kele Mou Bana (1991)
- Eliane Elias: A Long Story (1991)
- Fred Hersh: Forward Motion (1991)
- Freddie Hubbard: Temptation (1991)
- Guy Klucevsek: Flying Vegetables of the Apocalypse (1991)
- Jackie McLean: Rites of Passage (1991)
- Joanne Brackeen: Is It Really True (1991)
- Joanne Brackeen: Where Legends Dwell (1991)
- Joe Lovano: From the Soul (1991)
- Joey Baron: Tongue in Groove (1991)
- John Butcher: Thirteen Friendly Numbers (1991)
- John Patitucci: Heart Of The Bass (1991)
- John Scofield: Meant to Be (1991)
- Julius Hemphill: Fat Man and the Hard Blues (1991)
- London Jazz Composers' Orchestra: Theoria (1991)
- Marcus Roberts: As Serenity Approaches (1991)
- Marilyn Crispell: Images (1991)
- Marty Ehrlich: Side by Side (1991)
- Max Roach: To the Max (1991)
- Michael Formanek: Extended Animation (1991)
- Music Revelation Ensemble: After Dark (1991)
- Randy Weston: Spirits Of Our Ancestors (1991)
- Robert Dick: Venturi Shadows (1991)
- Sonny Sharrock: Ask the Ages (1991)
- Steve Coleman: Black Science (1991)
- Steve Lacy: Remains
- Steve Swallow: Swallow (1991)
- Steve Turre: Right There (1991)
- Terje Rypdal: Q.E.D. (1991)
- Tim Berne: Can't Put My Finger On It (1991)
- Trilok Gurtu: Living Magic (1991)
- Wayne Horvitz: Bring Your Camera (1991)
- Wynton Marsalis: Blue Interlude (1991)
- Yellowjackets: Politics (1991)

=== Deaths ===
- Miles Davis (May 26, 1926 – September 28, 1991) American trumpeter, bandleader and composer
- Stan Getz (February 2, 1927 – June 6, 1991)
- Pat Patrick (musician) (November 23, 1929 – December 31, 1991)
- Buck Clayton (November 12, 1911 – December 8, 1991)
- Bud Freeman (April 13, 1906 – March 15, 1991)
- King Kolax (November 6, 1912 – December 18, 1991)
- Charlie Barnet (October 26, 1913 – September 4, 1991)
- Slim Gaillard (January 4, 1916 – February 26, 1991)

== 1992 ==
=== Album releases ===
- Jane Ira Bloom: Art and Aviation (1992)
- Maria Schneider: Evanescence (1992)
- Geri Allen: Maroons (1992)
- Wynton Marsalis: Citi Movement (1992)
- Joe Lovano: Universal Language (1992)
- Sergey Kuryokhin: Some Combination of Fingers and Passion (1992)
- Medeski Martin and Wood: Notes From the Underground (1992)
- Courtney Pine: To The Eyes Of Creation (1992)
- Hank Roberts: Little Motor People (1992)
- Zeena Parkins: Ursa's Door (1992)
- Steve Turre: Sanctified Shells (1992)
- Pat Metheny: Secret Story (1992)
- Charles Gayle: Repent (1992)
- Michael Formanek: Loose Cannon (1992)
- Franz Koglmann: L'Heure Bleue (1992)
- Bill Frisell: Have a Little Faith (1992)
- Michael Mantler: Folly Seeing All This (1992)
- Bill Frisell: This Land (1992)
- Kenny Wheeler: Kayak (1992)
- Chick Corea & Bobby McFerrin: Play (1992)
- Aydin Esen: Anadolu (1992)
- Christy Doran: Corporate Art (1992)
- Hal Russell: Hal's Bells (1992)
- Joachim Kuhn: Dynamics (1992)
- John Scofield: What We Do (1992)
- Mulgrew Miller: Hand In Hand (1992)
- Paul Plimley: When Silence Pulls (1992)
- Ray Anderson: Every One of Us (1992)
- Uri Caine: Sphere Music (1992)
- Sonny Simmons: Ancient Ritual (1992)

=== Deaths ===
- Charlie Ventura (December 2, 1916 – January 17)
- Astor Piazzolla (March 11, 1921 – July 4)
- Ed Blackwell (October 10, 1929 – October 7)
- June Tyson (February 5, 1936 – November 24)
- Andy Kirk (May 28, 1898, in Newport, Kentucky – December 11)

== 1993 ==
=== Album releases ===
- Franz Koglmann: Cantos I-IV (1993)
- Bill Dixon: Vade Mecum (1993)
- Marilyn Crispell: Santuerio (1993)
- George E. Lewis: Voyager (1993)
- Matthew Shipp: Prism (1993)
- Zeena Parkins: Isabelle (1993)
- Pat Metheny Group: The Road to You - Live in Europe (1993)
- Bobby Previte: Hue and Cry (1993)
- Marty Ehrlich: Can You Hear A Motion (1993)
- Terence Blanchard: The Malcolm X Jazz Suite (1993)
- Music Revelation Ensemble: In The Name Of (1993)
- Henry Threadgill: Too Much Sugar for a Dime (1993)
- Dave Douglas: Parallel Worlds (1993)
- Wynton Marsalis: In This House, On This Morning (1993)
- Ken Vandermark: Big Head Eddie (1993)
- Charles Gayle: Consecration (1993)
- Greg Osby: 3D Lifestyles (1993)
- Mulgrew Miller: With Our Own Eyes (1993)
- John Scofield: Hand Jive (1993)
- Steve Coleman: Tao of Mad Phat (1993)
- James Ulmer: Harmolodic Guitar with Strings (1993)
- Irene Schweizer: Les Diaboliques (1993)
- Evan Parker: Synergetics - Phonomanie III (1993)
- David Liebman: The Seasons (1993)
- Chick Corea Elektric Band II: Paint the World (1993)
- Joe Maneri: Dahabenzapple (1993)
- Joey Baron: Raised Pleasure Dot (1993)
- Cecil Taylor: Always a Pleasure (1993)
- Charlie Hunter: Trio (1993)
- Lyle Mays Trio: Fictionary (1993)
- Gerry Hemingway: Demon Chaser (1993)
- Jessica Williams: Next Step (1993)
- Roger Neumann: Instant Heat (1993)
- Yosuke Yamashita: Kurdish Dance (1993)
- Tom Harrell: Upswing (1993)
- Ray Anderson: Big Band Record (1993)
- Arturo Sandoval: Danzon (1993)
- Eric Reed: It's All Right to Swing (1993)

=== Deaths ===
- Dizzy Gillespie (October 21, 1917 – January 6, 1993)
- Kenny Drew (August 28, 1928 – August 4, 1993)
- John Jenkins (January 3, 1931 – July 12, 1993)
- Sun Ra (May 22, 1914 – May 30, 1993)
- George Wallington (October 27, 1924 – February 15, 1993)
- Fraser MacPherson (10 April 1928 – 27 September 1993)
- Clifford Jordan (September 2, 1931, Chicago – March 27, 1993)

== 1994 ==
=== Album releases ===
- Myra Melford: Even the Sounds Shine (1994)
- Toshiko Akiyoshi: Desert Lady / Fantasy (1994)
- Matthew Shipp: Critical Mass (1994)
- David Ware: Cryptology (1994)
- Pat Metheny: Zero Tolerance for Silence (1994)
- Henry Threadgill: Carry the Day (1994)
- Ken Vandermark: Solid Action (1994)
- Steve Coleman: Def Trance Beat (1994)
- Chick Corea: Expressions (1994)
- Misha Mengelberg: Mix (1994)
- Bobby Previte: Slay the Suitors (1994)
- Joshua Redman: MoodSwing (1994)
- Franklin Kiermyer: Solomon's Daughter (1994)
- Mark Helias: Loopin' the Cool (1994)
- Jessica Williams: Momentum (1994)
- Eric Reed: The Swing and I (1994)

=== Deaths ===
- Joe Pass (January 13, 1929 – May 23, 1994)
- Carmen McRae (April 8, 1920 – November 10, 1994)
- Cab Calloway (December 25, 1907 – November 18, 1994)
- Sonny Sharrock (August 27, 1940 – May 26, 1994)
- Connie Kay (27 April 1927 – 30 November 1994)

== 1995 ==
=== Album releases ===
- Butch Morris: Testament (New World)
- Dave Douglas: In Our Lifetime (New World)
- Charlie Hunter: Bing, Bing, Bing! (Blue Note)
- Marvin Peterson: African Portraits (Teldec Classics)
- Guy Klucevsek: Citrus My Love (RecRec Music)
- Marty Ehrlich's Dark Woods Ensemble: Just Before the Dawn (New World)
- Matthew Shipp: Symbol Systems (No More Records)
- Gerry Hemingway: Marmalade King (hatART)
- Steve Turre: Rhythm Within (Antilles)
- Medeski Martin and Wood: Friday Afternoon in the Universe (Gramavision)
- Reggie Workman: Cerebral Caverns (Postcards)
- Muhal Richard Abrams: One Line, Two Views (New World)
- Dave Douglas: Five (Soul Note)
- Bill Frisell: Go West (Homestead)
- David Ware: DAO (Homestead)
- Pat Metheny Group: We Live Here (Geffen)
- Henry Threadgill: Makin' a Move (Columbia)
- Dave Holland: Dream of the Elders (ECM)
- Paul Plimley: Everything in Stage (Songlines Recordings)
- John Scofield: Groove Elation (Blue Note)
- Chick Corea Quartet: Time Warp (GRP Records)
- Don Byron: Music for Six Musicians (Nonesuch)
- Uri Caine: Toys (JMT)
- Courtney Pine: Modern Day Jazz Stories (Antilles, Verve)

=== Deaths ===
- Art Taylor (April 6, 1929 – February 6, 1995)
- Don Cherry (November 18, 1936 – October 19, 1995)
- John Gilmore (September 28 or October 29, 1931 – August 19 or August 20, 1995)
- Earle Warren (1914–1995)

== 1996 ==
=== Album releases ===
- Guillermo Gregorio: Approximately (hat ART)
- Ivo Perelman: Seeds, Visions and Counterpoint (Leo Records)
- Michael Formanek: Nature of the Beast (Enja)
- David Ware: Wisdom of Uncertainty (AUM Fidelity)
- Maria Schneider: Coming About (Enja)
- World Saxophone Quartet: Four Now (Justin Time)
- Zeena Parkins: Mouth=Maul=Betrayer (Tzadik)
- Kenny Wheeler with The Maritime Jazz Orchestra: Siren's Song (Justin Time)
- Gerry Hemingway: Perfect World (Random Acoustics)
- Matthew Shipp: By the Law of Music (hatART)
- Ivo Perelman: Sound Hierarchy (Music & Arts)
- Ben Neill: Triptycal (Antilles)
- Joshua Redman: Freedom In The Groove (Warner Bros.)
- Branford Marsalis: The Dark Keys (Sony Music)
- Henry Threadgill: Where's Your Cup? (Columbia)
- Evan Parker: Toward the Margins (ECM)
- Pat Metheny Group: Quartet (Geffen)
- John Scofield: Quiet (Verve)
- Eric Reed: Musicale (Impulse!)
- World Saxophone Quartet: Takin' It 2 the Next Level (Justin Time)
- David Ware: Oblations and Blessings (Silkheart)
- Olga Konkova Trio: Going With The Flow (Curling Legs)

=== Deaths ===
- Ella Fitzgerald (April 25, 1917 – June 15, 1996)
- Gerry Mulligan (April 6, 1927 – January 20, 1996)
- Barney Wilen (March 4, 1937 – May 25, 1996)

== 1997 ==
=== Album releases ===
- Guillermo Gregorio: Ellipsis (hatOLOGY)
- Matthew Shipp: Strata (hatOLOGY)
- Steve Coleman: Genesis & The Opening of the Way (RCA Victor)
- Marcus Roberts: Blues for the New Millennium (Columbia)
- ICP Orchestra: Jubilee Varia (hatOLOGY)
- Vandermark 5: Single Piece Flow (Atavistic)
- David Liebman: Time Immemorial (Enja)
- Wynton Marsalis: Blood on the Fields (Columbia)
- Franz Koglmann: O Moon My Pin Up (hatOLOGY)
- Courtney Pine: Underground (Verve)
- Wadada Leo Smith: Golden Hearts Remembrance (Chap Chap)
- David Liebman: The Elements: Water – Giver Of Life (Arkadia Jazz)
- Pat Metheny Group: Imaginary Day (Warner Bros.)
- Matthew Shipp: Before the World (FMP)
- Paul Plimley: Sensology (Maya Recordings)
- Matthew Shipp Quartet: The Flow of X (Thirsty Ear)
- Olga Konkova Trio: Her Point of View (Candid)

=== Deaths ===
- Tony Williams (December 12, 1945 — February 23, 1997)
- Tommy Turrentine (April 22, 1928 – May 15, 1997)
- Stéphane Grappelli (26 January 1908 – 1 December 1997)

== 1998 ==
=== Album releases ===
- Dave Douglas: Convergence (Black Saint/Soul Note)
- Vandermark 5: Target or Flag (Atavistic)
- Zeena Parkins: No Way Back (Atavistic)
- Evan Parker: Drawn Inward (ECM)
- Dave Holland: Points of View (ECM)
- Keith Tippett and Mujician: Colours Fulfilled (Cuneiform)
- Eric Reed: Pure Imagination (Impulse!, GRP)
- World Saxophone Quartet: Selim Sivad: a Tribute to Miles Davis (Justin Time)
- Joe Lovano: Trio Fascination: Edition One (Blue Note)
- Hans Mathisen featuring Kjersti Stubø: L.U.G.N

=== Deaths ===
- Frank Sinatra (December 12, 1915 – May 14, 1998)
- Tal Farlow (June 7, 1921 – July 25, 1998)

== 1999 ==
=== Album releases ===
- Jane Ira Bloom: The Red Quartets (Arabesque)
- Steve Coleman and Five Elements: The Sonic Language of Myth - Believing Learning Knowing (RCA Victor)
- Marty Ehrlich's Dark Woods Ensemble: Sojourn (Tzadik)
- Guillermo Gregorio Trio: Red Cube(d) (hatOLOGY)
- Paul Dunmall Octet: Bebop Starburst (Cuneiform)
- Evan Parker: Drawn Inward (ECM)
- Joshua Redman: Timeless Tales (for changing times) (Warner Bros.)
- Maybe Monday: Saturn's Finger (Buzz Records)
- Branford Marsalis Quartet: Requiem (Columbia)
- Terence Blanchard: Jazz in Film (Sony Classical)
- Richard Lee Johnson: Fingertip Ship (Metro Blue)
- Eric Reed: Manhattan Melodies (Verve)
- Zeena Parkins: Pan-Acousticon (Atavistic)

=== Deaths ===
- Grover Washington Jr. (December 12, 1943 – December 17, 1999)
- Milt Jackson (January 1, 1923 – October 9, 1999)
- Art Farmer (August 21, 1928 – October 4, 1999)
- Clifford Jarvis (August 26, 1941 – November 26, 1999)
- Sweets Edison (October 10, 1915 – July 27, 1999)
- Joe Williams (December 12, 1918 – March 29, 1999)
- Charles Earland (May 24, 1941 – December 11, 1999)
