= 1993 in jazz =

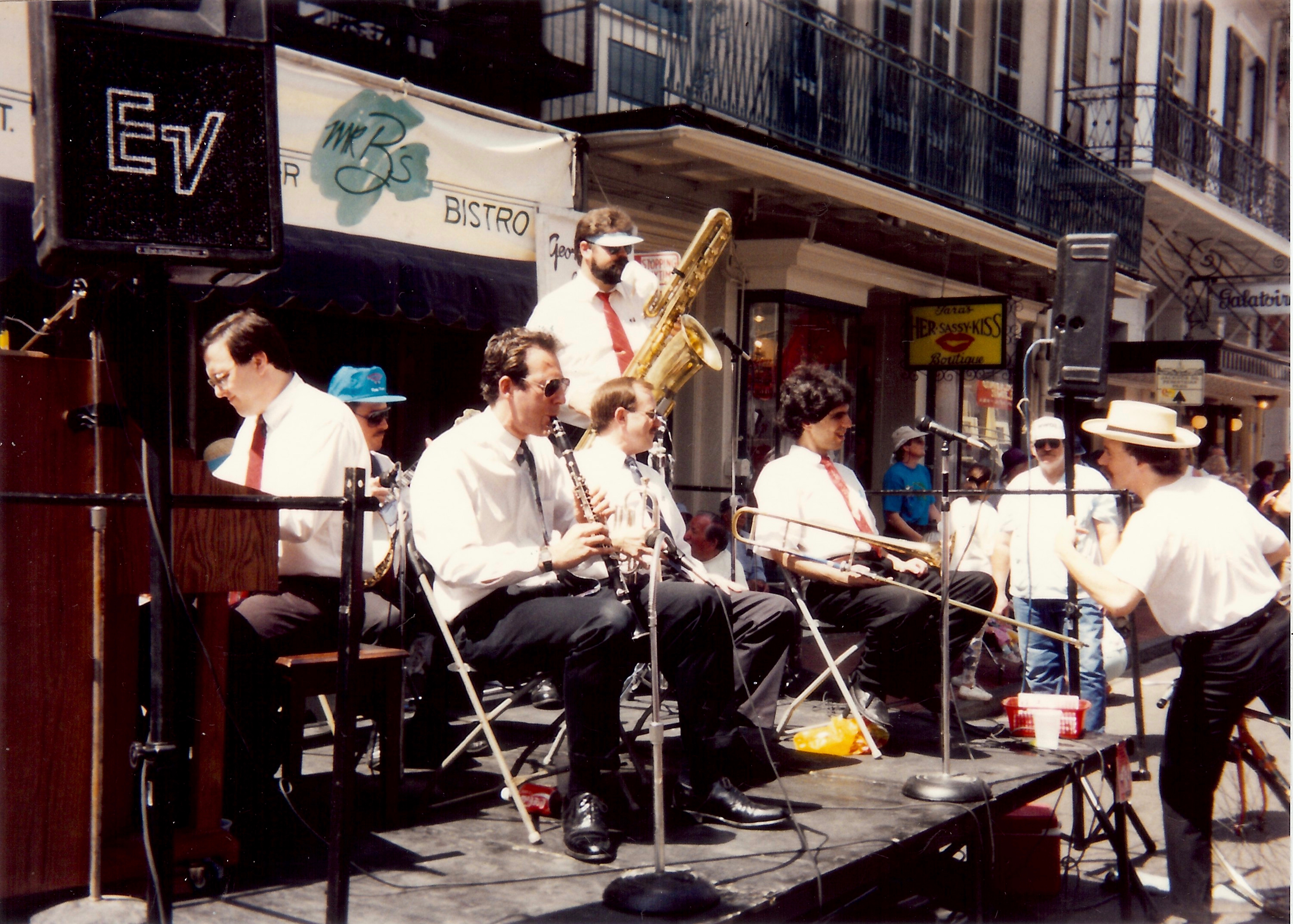
- Band at French Quarter Festival, New Orleans. Visible musicians include Dan Levinson, clarinet; George Finola, cornet and leader; David Sager, trombone; Tom Saunders, bass sax. Tom McDermott in hat off stage comments to band
- Decade: 1990s in jazz
- Music: 1993 in music
- Standards: List of post-1950 jazz standards
- See also: 1992 in jazz – 1994 in jazz

This is a timeline documenting events of Jazz in the year 1993.

== Events ==
=== April ===
- 10 – The 20th Vossajazz started in Vossavangen, Norway (April 10–12).

=== June ===
- 2 – The 21st Nattjazz started in Bergen, Norway (June 2–13).
- 5 – The 22nd Moers Festival started in Moers, Germany (June 5–8).
- 29 – The 14th Montreal International Jazz Festival started in Montreal, Quebec, Canada (June 29 – July 9).

=== July ===
- 1 – The 3rd Jazz Fest Wien started in Wien, Austria (July 1 – 15).
- 2
  - The 16th Copenhagen Jazz Festival started in Copenhagen, Denmark (July 2–11).
  - The 27th Montreux Jazz Festival started in Montreux, Switzerland (July 2–17).
- 10
  - The 18th North Sea Jazz Festival started in The Hague (July 10–12).
  - The 28th Pori Jazz started in Pori, Finland (July 10 – 18).
- 13 – The 34th Moldejazz started in Molde, Norway (July 13 – 18).

=== August ===
- 13 – The 10th Brecon Jazz Festival started in Brecon, Wales (April 13–15).

=== September ===
- 17 – The 36th Monterey Jazz Festival started in Monterey, California (September 17–19).

== Album releases ==
- Franz Koglmann: Cantos I-IV
- Bill Dixon: Vade Mecum
- Marilyn Crispell: Santuerio
- George E. Lewis: Voyager
- Matthew Shipp: Prism
- Zeena Parkins: Isabelle
- Pat Metheny Group: The Road to You – Live in Europe
- Bobby Previte: Hue And Cry
- Marty Ehrlich: Can You Hear A Motion
- Music Revelation Ensemble: In The Name Of
- Henry Threadgill: Too Much Sugar for a Dime
- Carol Sloane: Sweet & Slow
- Dave Douglas: Parallel Worlds
- Wynton Marsalis: In This House, On This Morning
- Ken Vandermark: Big Head Eddie
- Charles Gayle: Consecration
- Greg Osby: 3D Lifestyles
- Mulgrew Miller: With Our Own Eyes
- John Scofield: Hand Jive
- Steve Coleman: Tao of Mad Phat
- James Ulmer: Harmolodic Guitar with Strings
- Irene Schweizer: Les Diaboliques
- Evan Parker: Synergetics – Phonomanie III
- David Liebman: The Seasons
- Chick Corea Elektric Band II: Paint the World
- Marcus Miller: The Sun Don't Lie
- Joe Maneri: Dahabenzapple
- Joey Baron: Raised Pleasure Dot
- Joshua Redman: Joshua Redman
- Cecil Taylor: Always a Pleasure
- Charlie Hunter: Trio
- Lyle Mays Trio: Fictionary
- Gerry Hemingway: Demon Chaser
- Jessica Williams: Next Step
- Roger Neumann: Instant Heat
- Yosuke Yamashita: Kurdish Dance
- Tom Harrell: Upswing
- Ray Anderson: Big Band Record
- Arturo Sandoval: Danzon
- Michael Franks: Dragonfly Summer
- David S. Ware: Third Ear Recitation
- Eliane Elias: Paulistana

== Deaths ==
January

- 6 – Dizzy Gillespie, American trumpeter, bandleader, and composer (born 1917).
- 23
  - Charles Greenlee, American trombonist (born 1927).
  - Thomas A. Dorsey, American pianist and band leader (born 1899).
- 27 – Eddie Calhoun, American upright bassist (born 1921).
- 30 – Ryoichi Hattori, Japanese composer (born 1907).

February

- 14 – Elek Bacsik, Hungarian-born American violinist and guitarist (born 1926).
- 15 – George Wallington, American pianist and composer (born 1924).
- 17 – Sammy Lowe, American trumpeter, arranger and conductor (born 1918).
- 24 – Gene Porter, American saxophonist and clarinetist (born 1910).

March

- 3 – Harper Goff, American artist, musician, and actor (born 1911).
- 4 – Art Hodes, American pianist (born 1904).
- 8
  - Billy Eckstine, American singer (born 1914).
  - Singleton Palmer, American multi-instrumentalist and bandleader (born 1913).
- 9 – Bob Crosby, American bandleader and singer (born 1913).
- 15 – Gene Leis, American guitarist and bandleader (born 1920).
- 25 – Jake Porter, American trumpeter and record producer (born 1916).
- 27 – Clifford Jordan, American saxophonist (born 1931).

April

- 3 – Herman Fowlkes Jr., American musician and educator (born 1919).

May

- 22 – Juice Wilson, American violinist (born 1904).
- 30 – Sun Ra, American composer, bandleader, and pianist (born 1914).

June

- 5 – Dupree Bolton, American trumpeter (born 1929).
- 7 – Louie Ramirez, American percussionist, and vibraphonist (born 1938).
- 16 – Lebert Lombardo, Canadian-American trumpeter and singer (born 1905).
- 21 – Al Fairweather, British trumpeter (born 1927).
- 22 – Emmett Berry, American trumpeter (born 1915).
- 25 – Rich Matteson, American musician and collegiate music educator (born 1929).

July

- 11 – Mario Bauza, Afro-Cuban clarinetist, saxophonist, and trumpeter (born 1911).
- 12 – John Jenkins, American saxophonist (born 1931).
- 22
  - Art Porter Sr., American pianist (born 1934).
  - Leon "Pee Wee" Whittaker, African American trombonist (born 1906).
- 30 – Don Myrick, American saxophonist, The Pharaohs (born 1940).

August

- 1
  - Bob Carter, American bassist and arranger (born 1922).
  - Max Jones, British jazz author, radio host, and journalist (born 1917).
- 4 – Kenny Drew, American pianist (born 1928).
- 5 – Bob Cooper, American West Coast saxophonist (born 1925).
- 10 – Eva Olmerová, Czech singer (born 1934).

September

- 6 – Bjarne Liller, Danish singer-songwriter (born 1935).
- 7 – Adele Girard, American harpist (born 1913).
- 9 – Jimmy Deuchar, Scottish trumpeter and big band arranger (born 1930).
- 13 – Steve Jordan, American guitarist (born 1919.
- 16 – J. R. Monterose, American saxophonist (born 1927).
- 17 – Elmer Crumbley, American trombonist (born 1908).
- 27 – Fraser MacPherson, Canadian saxophonist (born 1928).

October

- 2 – Ahmed Abdul-Malik, American upright bassist and oud player (born 1927).
- 9 – Greely Walton, American tenor saxophonist (born 1904).

November

- 7 – Adelaide Hall, American-born UK-based singer (born 1901).
- 8 – Dick Cathcart, American trumpeter (born 1924).
- 11 – Erskine Hawkins, American trumpet player and big band leader (born 1914).
- 17 – Teddy Powell, American guitarist, composer, and big band leader (born 1905).
- 28 – Bruce Turner, English saxophonist, clarinetist, and bandleader (born 1922).
- 29 – Alan Clare, British jazz pianist (born 1921).

December

- 4 – Frank Zappa, American guitarist, composer, and band leader (born 1940),
- 9 – Carter Jefferson, American tenor saxophonist (born 1946).
- 25 – Ann Ronell, American composer and lyricist (born 1905).

== Births ==
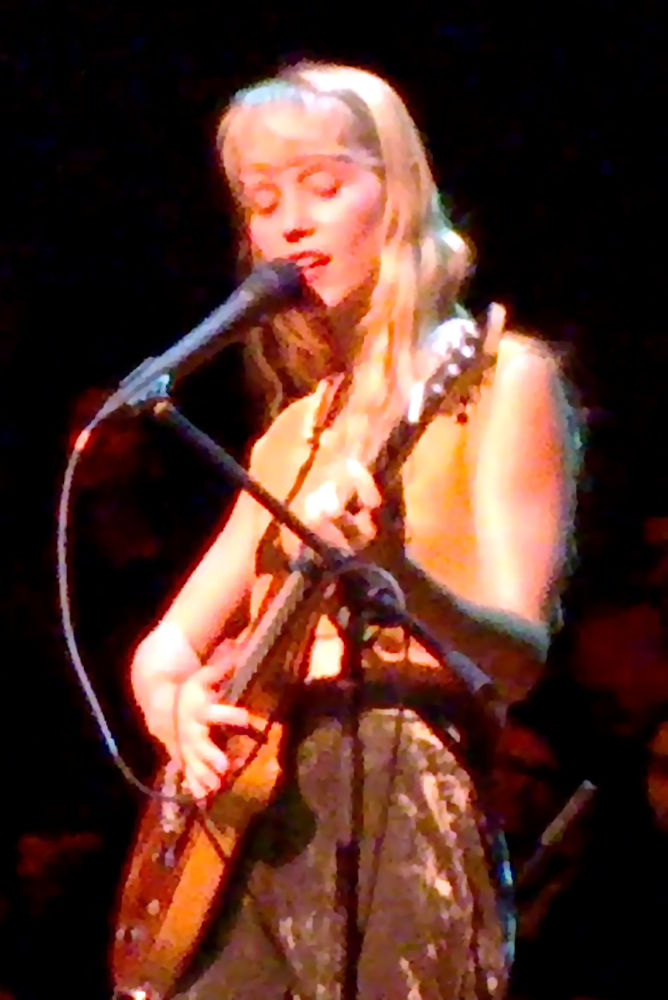
Alice Phoebe Lou 2017 at Funkhaus Berlin.

April

- 19 – Arianna Neikrug, American singer, songwriter, and arranger.

September

- 24 – Narelle Kheng, Singaporean percussionist and vocalist.

November

- 21 – Fredrik Halland, Norwegian singer, songwriter, guitarist, and music producer.

Unknown date

- Alice Phoebe Lou, South African singer and songwriter residing in Berlin.
- Arne Martin Nybo, Norwegian guitarist.
- Rohey Taalah, Norwegian singer and songwriter.

== See also ==
- 1990s in jazz
- List of years in jazz
- 1993 in music
