= 1992 in jazz =

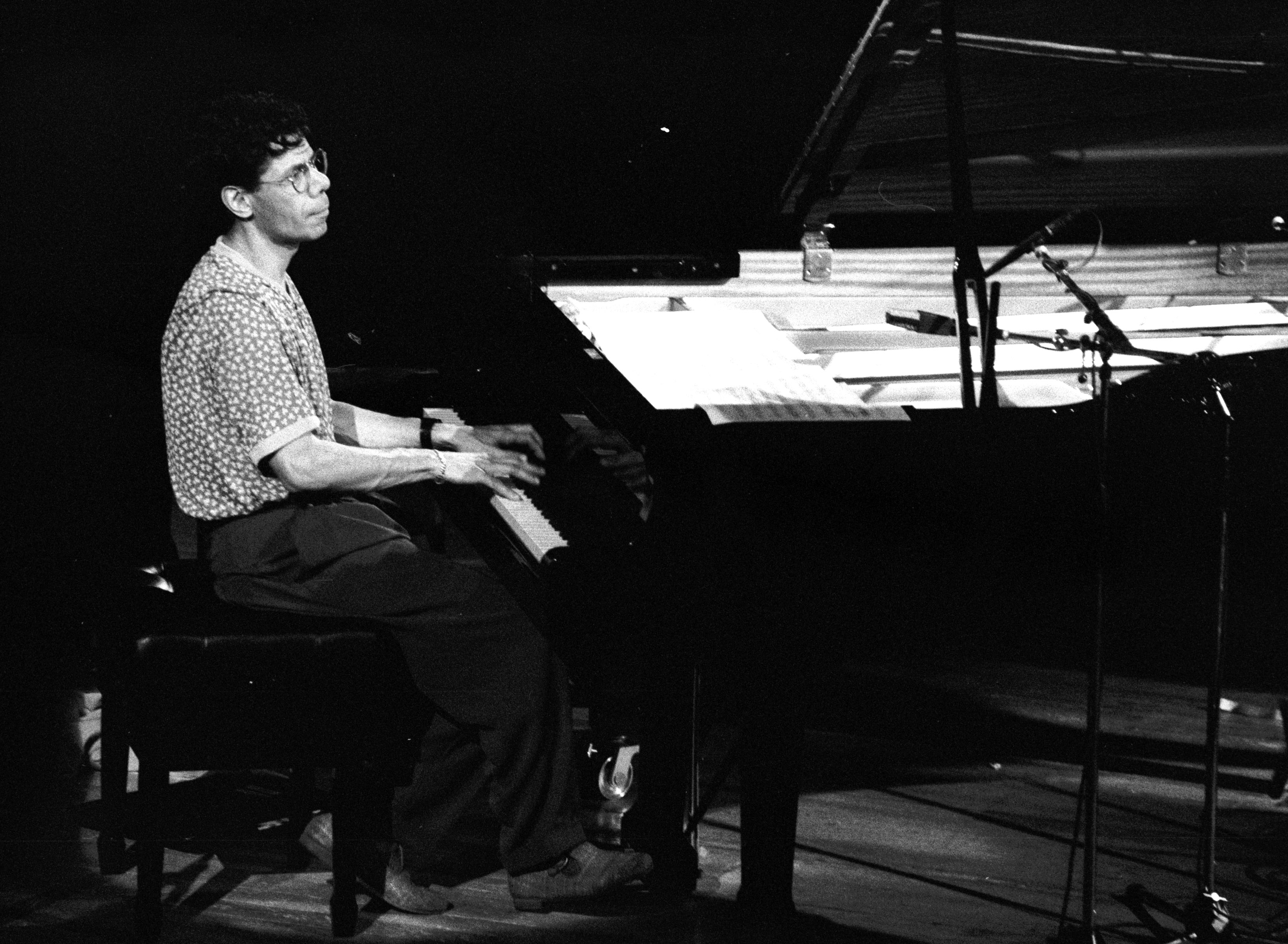
- Chick Corea in concert at Deauville (Normandy, France) in 1992.
- Decade: 1990s in jazz
- Music: 1992 in music
- Standards: List of post-1950 jazz standards
- See also: 1991 in jazz – 1993 in jazz

This is a timeline documenting events of jazz in the year 1992.

== Events ==
=== April ===
- 10 – The 19th Vossajazz started in Vossavangen, Norway (April 10 – 12).

=== May ===
- 20 – The 20th Nattjazz started in Bergen, Norway (May 20 – 31).

=== June ===
- 5 – The 21st Moers Festival started in Moers, Germany (June 5 – 8).

=== July ===
- 2 – 26th Montreux Jazz Festival started in Switzerland (July 2 – 18).
- 10 – The 17th North Sea Jazz Festival started in The Hague (July 10 – 12).

=== August ===
- 13 – The 9th Brecon Jazz Festival started in Brecon, Wales (April 13 – 15).

=== September ===
- 18 – The 35th Monterey Jazz Festival started in Monterey, California (September 18 – 20).

== Album releases ==
- Jane Ira Bloom: Art and Aviation
- Maria Schneider: Evanescence
- Geri Allen: Maroons
- Wynton Marsalis: Citi Movement
- Joe Lovano: Universal Language
- Terence Blanchard: The Malcolm X Jazz Suite
- Sergey Kuryokhin: Some Combination of Fingers and Passion
- Medeski Martin & Wood: Notes From the Underground
- Courtney Pine: To The Eyes Of Creation
- Hank Roberts: Little Motor People
- Zeena Parkins: Ursa's Door
- Steve Turre: Sanctified Shells
- Pat Metheny: Secret Story
- Charles Gayle: Repent
- Michael Formanek: Loose Cannon
- Franz Koglmann: L'Heure Bleue
- Bill Frisell: Have a Little Faith
- Michael Mantler: Folly Seeing All This
- Bill Frisell: This Land
- Kenny Wheeler: Kayak
- Chick Corea & Bobby McFerrin: Play
- Aydin Esen: Anadolu
- Christy Doran: Corporate Art
- Hal Russell: Hal's Bells
- Joachim Kuhn: Dynamics
- John Scofield: What We Do
- Mulgrew Miller: Hand In Hand
- Paul Plimley: When Silence Pulls
- Ray Anderson: Every One of Us
- Uri Caine: Sphere Music
- Sonny Simmons: Ancient Ritual
- John Pizzarelli: All of Me
- Roy Campbell: New Kingdom
- David S. Ware: Flight of I
- Matthew Shipp: Circular Temple
- Carol Sloane: Heart's Desire
- Eliane Elias: Fantasia
- Hugh Masekela: Beatin' Aroun de Bush
- Yellowjackets: Live Wires

== Deaths ==
January

- 17 – Charlie Ventura, American tenor saxophonist and bandleader (born 1916).

February

- 8 – Denny Wright, English guitarist (born 1924).

March

- 4 – Mary Osborne, American guitarist (born 1921).
- 6 – Hugh Gibb, English drummer and bandleader (born 1916).

April

- 14 – Sammy Price, American pianist and bandleader (born 1908).
- 20 – Leon Abramson or Lee Abrams, American drummer (born 1925).

June

- 10 – Hachidai Nakamura, Japanese songwriter and pianist (born 1931).

August

- 1 – Alfred "Chico" Alvarez, American trumpeter (born 1920).
- 11 – Hayes Pillars, American tenor saxophonist and bandleader (born 1906).

October

- 3 – John Carisi, American trumpeter and composer (born 1922).
- 7 – Ed Blackwell, American drummer (born 1929).

November

- 8 – Red Mitchell, American upright bassist (born 1927).
- 14 – George Adams, American saxophonist (born 1940).
- 24 – June Tyson, American singer (born 1926).

December

- 11 – Andy Kirk, American saxophonist and tubist (born 1898).

== Births ==
January

- 17 – Kristian B. Jacobsen, Norwegian bassist and composer.

March

- 5 – Oddrun Lilja Jonsdottir, Icelandic/Norwegian guitarist, singer, and composer.
- 6 – Lukas Zabulionis, Norwegian saxophonist and composer.
- 15 – Elisabeth Lid Trøen, Norwegian saxophonist.
- 17 – Alf Hulbækmo, Norwegian pianist.

April

- 6 – Mathias Stubø, Norwegian electronica artist.

October

- 1 – Gismo Graf, German guitarist and composer.

December

- 10 – Vincent Ingala, American saxophonist.

Unknown date

- Axel Skalstad, Norwegian drummer.
- Siril Malmedal Hauge, Norwegian singer, composer and band leader.

== See also ==
- 1990s in jazz
- List of years in jazz
- 1992 in music
