= Standard Time, Vol. 4: Marsalis Plays Monk =

Studio album by Wynton Marsalis
- Released: April 21, 1999
- Recorded: September 17–18, 1993; October 3–4, 1994
- Genre: Jazz
- Length: 64:45
- Label: Columbia
- Producer: Steven Epstein

Wynton Marsalis chronology
Live in Swing City: Swingin' with the Duke (1999)	Standard Time, Vol. 4: Marsalis Plays Monk (1999)	A Fiddler's Tale (1999)

Standard Time, Vol. 4: Marsalis Plays Monk is an album by the jazz trumpeter Wynton Marsalis, released in 1999.

== Reception ==
Professional ratings
Review scores
Source	Rating
All About Jazz	5/5 stars
AllMusic	3.5/5 stars
The Penguin Guide to Jazz Recordings	3.5/4 stars

In a review for AllMusic, Stephen Thomas Erlewine wrote that Marsalis "avoids the obvious choices, the songs that have long been part of every jazz musician's repertoire," and "decided to give all these songs clean, direct arrangements, which makes this music more accessible." He commented: "To some listeners, it may be a little disconcerting to hear the rough edges sanded away, but these precise arrangements are quite engaging in their own right."

The authors of The Penguin Guide to Jazz Recordings stated: "The standard of playing is as high and as disciplined as ever... One to admire, rather than like."

Writing for All About Jazz, C. Michael Bailey remarked: "Marsalis Plays Monk is a pleasure from start to finish... This is a very good disc. Marsalis has a special reverence for the leaders in jazz: Louis Armstrong, Duke Ellington, and Thelonious Monk."

Willard Jenkins of JazzTimes wrote: "On this disc one hears a concerted effort to avoid the gates of apathy, through conscious editing of the improvisations, varying the format to a refreshing degree, and addressing Monk’s music with a New Orleans kind of sparkle and joy, including use of polyphony, that is palpable and rewarding."

In an article for Burning Ambulance, Phil Freeman stated: "The music is as lush and genteel as most of Marsalis's work. The arrangements emphasize the stateliness of Monk's writing, a side often overlooked in favor of his deliberately rough, 'off' rhythms and jarring chords. The horn charts glide more than they punch... At its best, this album suggests an imaginary Duke Ellington album of Monk compositions."

== Track listing ==
All tracks are written by Thelonious Monk, except track 8.

No.	Title	Length
1.	"Thelonious"	4:51
2.	"Evidence"	4:26
3.	"We See"	3:20
4.	"Monk's Mood"	3:02
5.	"Worry Later"	6:15
6.	"Four in One"	5:49
7.	"Reflections"	6:15
8.	"In Walked Monk"	4:23
9.	"Hackensack"	3:04
10.	"Let's Cool One"	4:11
11.	"Brilliant Corners"	4:50
12.	"Brake's Sake"	6:59
13.	"Ugly Beauty"	2:38
14.	"Green Chimneys"	4:42

== Personnel ==
- Wynton Marsalis – trumpet
- Wessell Anderson – alto saxophone
- Wycliffe Gordon – trombone
- Eric Reed – piano
- Ben Wolfe – double bass
- Reginald Veal – double bass
- Herlin Riley – drums
- Walter Blanding – tenor saxophone
- Victor Goines – tenor saxophone
