= Lesure =

Lesure is a surname. Notable people with the surname include:

- François Lesure (1923–2001), French librarian and musicologist
- Jacques Lesure (born 1962), American jazz musician
- James Lesure (born 1970), American actor
- Hugh R. LeSure (born 1986), American author and musician

== See also ==
- Leisure (disambiguation)
