= Levee Low Moan: Soul Gestures in Southern Blue, Vol. 3 =

Studio album by Wynton Marsalis
- Released: July 30, 1991
- Genre: Jazz; Dixieland
- Length: 48:09
- Label: Columbia

Wynton Marsalis chronology
Uptown Ruler: Soul Gestures in Southern Blue, Vol. 2 (1991)	Levee Low Moan: Soul Gestures in Southern Blue, Vol. 3 (1991)	Baroque Duet (1992)

Levee Low Moan: Soul Gestures in Southern Blue, Vol. 3 is an album by Wynton Marsalis that was released in 1991. The album reached a peak position of number 8 on Top Jazz Albums chart of Billboard magazine.

== Reception ==
Professional ratings
Review scores
Source	Rating
The Penguin Guide to Jazz Recordings	3.5/4 stars

The AllMusic reviewer wrote: "although the individual solos are fine, not much really happens; overall it is a rather weird tribute to the blues". The Billboard reviewer of all three volumes of Soul Gestures in Southern Blue commented on their "atmosphere of politeness, an absence of swing, and a somewhat shocking lack of true blues feeling".

== Track listing ==
All tracks are composed and performed by Wynton Marsalis unless otherwise noted.

1. Levee Low Moan – 11:15
2. Jig's Jig – 8:09
3. So This Is Jazz, Huh? – 7:00
4. In the House of Williams – 10:06 (Todd Williams)
5. Superb Starling – 11:39

== Personnel ==
- Wynton Marsalis- trumpet
- Todd Williams- tenor saxophone
- Wes “Warmdaddy” Anderson- alto saxophone
- Marcus Roberts- piano
- Reginald Veal- acoustic bass
- Herlin Riley- drums
