= Willie Jones III =

American drummer (born 1968)

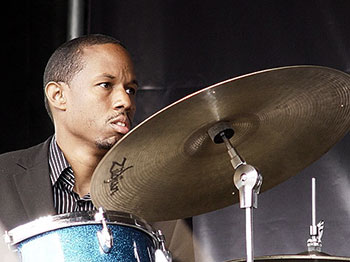
- Willie Jones III; Aarhus, Denmark 2007

Background information
- Born: June 8, 1968; Los Angeles, California, U.S.
- Genres: Jazz
- Occupations: Musician, educator
- Instrument: Drums
- Years active: 1990s–present
- Label: WJ3
- Website: www.williejones3.com

Willie Jones III (born June 8, 1968, in Los Angeles, California) is a jazz drummer. He has played, toured, and recorded with Horace Silver, Roy Hargrove, Hank Jones, Cedar Walton, and Herbie Hancock. He played on Arturo Sandoval's Grammy-winning album Hot House (1998).

== Early life ==
Jones' father, also named Willie Jones, was a pianist, composer and arranger, who moved to Los Angeles from Jacksonville in 1961. By the time Jones was born, his father "was gigging locally and working as a vocal coach for entertainers, including Ann-Margret."

Willie Jones III was born on June 8, 1968, in Los Angeles. Jones reported that he wanted to be a jazz musician from the age of seven.

== Later life and career ==
Jones was one of the founding members of the band Black Note in 1990. Members of this ensemble included, at various times, Ark Sano, Eric Reed, Gilbert Castellanos, James Mahone, Kenneth Crouch, Mark Shelby, and Richard E. Grant. They released several albums.

In 1991, Jones began studying at the California Institute of the Arts, where he took drum lessons from Albert "Tootie" Heath. Jones played with Milt Jackson in 1994, and toured with trumpeter Arturo Sandoval from 1994 to 1998.

Jones was based in Los Angeles until he moved to New York in 1997. He played in trumpeter Roy Hargrove's quintet from 1998 to 2006.

In 2000, Jones founded an independent jazz label, WJ3 Records. He said in 2017 that "It's a self-investment, [...] I'm not making a profit, but I'm not losing any money. I've become more proficient at putting out each project." He has regularly played with pianist Eric Reed, as the drummer for Wynton Marsalis' Jazz at Lincoln Center, and has several CDs released as a leader on his own label, playing hard bop and swing.

Jones has taught at Northwestern University since 2010.

In 2014, Jones filed a lawsuit against California rapper Kendrick Lamar for allegedly sampling "The Thorn" illegally in Lamar's song "Rigamortus".

== Playing style ==
Guitarist Russell Malone commented in 2017 that, "Some drummers can't get through two bars of music without trying to do something cute and slick, but with Willie, the time and the groove is not an afterthought. He's aware of each component of the song – the melody, the changes and the form. I like to incorporate different grooves into my things, and Willie does not turn up his nose at them. He knows exactly what to do."

== Discography ==
An asterisk (*) indicates that the year is that of release.

=== As leader/co-leader ===
Year recorded	Title	Label	Personnel/Notes With Black Note
1991	43rd & Degnan	World Stage	With Black Note
1993	L.A. Underground	Red	With Black Note
1994	Jungle Music	Columbia	With Black Note
1996	Nothin' but the Swing	Impulse!	With Black Note
1996–99	Vol. 1...Straight Swingin'	WJ3	
2001-02	Vol. 2...Don't Knock The Swing	WJ3	
2006	Vol. III	WJ3	
2009	The Next Phase	WJ3	
2012	Willie Jones III Sextet Plays The Max Roach Songbook	WJ3	In concert
2014	Groundwork	WJ3	
2016	My Point Is...	WJ3	
2020	Fallen Heroes	WJ3	

=== As sideman ===
Year recorded	Leader	Title	Label	Year released
1994	Kei Akagi	Mirror Puzzle	AudioQuest	1994
1998	Ryan Kisor	The Usual Suspects	Lightyear	1998
1998	Arturo Sandoval	Hot House	N2K	1998
1998	Horace Silver	Jazz Has a Sense of Humor	Verve	1999
1999	Roy Hargrove	Moment to Moment	Verve	2000
2001	Peter Beets	New York Trio	Criss Cross Jazz	2001
2001	Jesse van Ruller	Here and There	Criss Cross Jazz	2002
2002	Peter Beets	New York Trio – Page Two	Criss Cross Jazz	2003
2005	Harold Mabern	Somewhere Over the Rainbow	Venus	2006
2005	Peter Zak	For Tomorrow	SteepleChase	2007
2007	Houston Person	Thinking of You	HighNote	2007
2008?	Ryan Kisor	Conception: Cool and Hot	Birds	2008
2009	Cedar Walton	Voices Deep Within	HighNote	2009
2010	Houston Person	Moment to Moment	HighNote	2010
2011	Cedar Walton	The Bouncer	HighNote	2011
2012	Floriaan Wempe	Flo's Flow	Challenge Records	2012
2013	Peter Zak	The Disciple	SteepleChase	2014
2022?	Ron Jackson	Standards and My Songs	Roni Music	2022
