= Jacques Lesure =

American jazz musician (born 1962)

Jacques Lesure (born December 19, 1962, in Detroit, Michigan, United States) is an American jazz guitarist and recording artist. He is signed to WJ3 Records. His performances can be heard in La La Land, the Academy Award winning movie.

== Life and career ==
Lesure was born in Detroit and first began playing guitars at the age of 10 in his church. He was influenced by people like George Benson and Kenny Burrell. His professional career started in gospel music with The Clark Sisters, Commissioned and other prominent Detroit gospel musicians, while studying jazz at the same time. In 1980 he became fully involved in jazz. Lesure is also an author, motivational speaker and radio/podcast host. He has performed with several jazz artists, such as Jimmy Smith and Stanley Turrentine as well as Wynton Marsalis, Eric Reed, Warren Wolf and Gregory Porter.

== Discography ==
- A Crenshaw Christmas 2010, TLG Records
- When She Smiles 2013, WJ3 Records
- Camaraderie 2015, WJ3 Records
- For The Love of You 2017, WJ3 Records
