= Black note =

Black note may refer to:

- Black-colored keys on a keyboard
- Black Note, an American jazz ensemble
- note nere, a style of madrigal composition in medieval music
