= The Marciac Suite =

Studio album by Wynton Marsalis
- Released: 2000
- Genre: Jazz
- Label: Columbia
- Producer: Delfeayo Marsalis

Wynton Marsalis chronology
Selections from the Village Vanguard Box (2000)	The Marciac Suite (2000)	Popular Songs: The Best of Wynton Marsalis (2000)

The Marciac Suite is an album by the American musician Wynton Marsalis, released in 2000. He is credited with his Septet. Marsalis recorded the music for the annual Jazz in Marciac festival. The album was originally included as a bonus disc with the Swinging into the 21st series, released in 1999.

== Production ==
The album was produced by Delfeayo Marsalis. Every song title references Marciac, France. "Guy Lafitte" is a tribute to the French saxophonist. "Jean-Louis Is Everywhere" is about the festival's organizer. Wessell Anderson played alto saxophone; Herlin Riley played drums. Cyrus Chestnut contributed on piano.

== Critical reception ==
Professional ratings
Review scores
Source	Rating
AllMusic	4/5 stars
Calgary Herald	2.5/4 stars
The Penguin Guide to Jazz on CD	3.5/4 stars
The Virgin Encyclopedia of Jazz	3/5 stars

The Boston Globe called the album "a more natural and less historically self-conscious approach to improvising on Marsalis's part." The New York Times wrote that it "has gorgeous compositional ideas and thick, glowing harmonies." The San Diego Union-Tribune concluded that "no single part stands out from the others, but the entire composition captures the warmth Marsalis obviously feels for the tiny village with a love of jazz." The Los Angeles Times determined that Marsalis's trumpet playing is "filled with a pure, lighthearted, hard-swinging joie de vivre that is not always present in his more 'serious' works." The Calgary Herald opined that The Marciac Suite "sometimes dabbles in the horn-heavy chaos of Marsalis' native New Orleans, though that often sounds calculated here."

AllMusic deemed the album "the most artistically successful of Marsalis' original works in his 1999 series." The Penguin Guide to Jazz on CD considered it "one of Wynton's happiest and most sheerly enjoyable sets."

== Track listing ==
No.	Title	Length
1.	"Loose Duck"
2.	"The Big Top"
3.	"Jean-Louis Is Everywhere"
4.	"Mademoiselle d'Gascony"
5.	"Armagnac Dreams"
6.	"Marciac Fun"
7.	"For My Kids at the Collège of Marciac"
8.	"Marciac Moon"
9.	"d'Artagnan"
10.	"Guy Lafitte"
11.	"B Is for Boussaget (and Bass)"
12.	"In the House of Laberriere"
13.	"Sunflowers"
