= Standard Time, Vol. 6: Mr. Jelly Lord =

Studio album by Wynton Marsalis
- Released: September 7, 1999
- Recorded: January 12–13, 1999
- Genre: Jazz
- Length: 61:01
- Label: Columbia/Sony Classical

Wynton Marsalis chronology
Sweet Release and Ghost Story (1999)	Standard Time, Vol. 6: Mr. Jelly Lord (1999)	Listen to the Storytellers (1999)

Standard Time, Vol. 6: Mr. Jelly Lord is an album by jazz trumpeter Wynton Marsalis that was released in 1999. The album peaked at number 7 on the Billboard Top Jazz Albums chart.

== Reception ==
Professional ratings
Review scores
Source	Rating
All About Jazz	5/5 stars
AllMusic	4/5 stars
The Penguin Guide to Jazz Recordings	4/4 stars

In a review for AllMusic, Richard S. Ginell wrote: "This is mostly gutbucket, stomping, swinging New Orleans jazz through the eyes and ears of avid students of old records -- and they have absorbed a good deal of the original raffish, joyous feeling... The results are often hilarious, and certainly instructive."

The authors of The Penguin Guide to Jazz Recordings noted that "Wynton's playing has rarely sounded so relaxed and so raw," and stated: "There is no attempt to lend these astonishing compositions any false grandeur; they have quite enough as it is."

C. Michael Bailey of All About Jazz commented: "Marsalis is an acquired taste, to be sure, often coming off as too reverent for the music, but this recording is as near a perfect and genuinely heartfelt a performance as could be expected."

Writing for Jazz Times, Willard Jenkins remarked: "the band does not address Jelly’s music as period pieces, but on Wynton's own terms; not as deconstructionist, but as reverent update. Hewing to the tradition of this music, while giving it a contemporary polish is no small feat, yet it is accomplished here with aplomb."

Writing for Burning Ambulance, Phil Freeman stated: "As an album, Mr. Jelly Lord is a lot of fun. The band is clearly having a blast digging into these tunes, with Riley setting up a stomping, clashing parade rhythm and the horns engaging in raucous polyphony and call-and-response. Marsalis is often at his best when growling through a plunger mute, and his interaction with trombonist Gordon is terrific throughout."

== Track listing ==
All tracks are written by Jelly Roll Morton except where noted.

No.	Title	Writer(s)	Length
1.	"Red Hot Pepper"		3:41
2.	"New Orleans Bump"		4:32
3.	"King Porter Stomp"		3:10
4.	"The Pearls"		3:51
5.	"Deep Creek"		5:14
6.	"Mamanita"		2:48
7.	"Sidewalk Blues"		5:12
8.	"Jungle Blues"		6:50
9.	"Big Lip Blues"		3:17
10.	"Dead Man Blues"	Jelly Roll Morton, Anita Gonzales	4:40
11.	"Smoke-House Blues"	Jelly Roll Morton, Charles Luke	4:51
12.	"Bill Goat Stomp"		2:58
13.	"Courthouse Stomp"		3:28
14.	"Black Bottom Stomp"		4:20
15.	"Tom Cat Blues"		2:09

== Personnel ==
- Wynton Marsalis – trumpet
- Harry Connick, Jr. – piano
- Eric Reed – piano
- Eric Lewis – piano
- Victor Goines – clarinet, soprano saxophone, tenor saxophone
- Wessell Anderson – alto saxophone
- Danilo Pérez – piano
- Don Vappie – banjo, guitar
- Wycliffe Gordon – trombone, trumpet, tuba
- Lucien Barbarin – trombone
- Michael White – clarinet
- Reginald Veal – bass
- Herlin Riley – drums
- Jen Wyler – engineer
- Steven Epstein – producer
- Todd Whitelock – engineer

Credits adapted from AllMusic.
