= Caffeine (album) =

Studio album by Caffeine
- Released: 1994
- Recorded: November 20, 1993
- Studio: Sparrow Sound Design, Chicago
- Genre: Jazz
- Length: 72:59
- Label: Okka Disk
- Producer: Jim Baker

Ken Vandermark chronology
Big Head Eddie (1993)	Caffeine (1994)	Solid Action (1994)

Caffeine is the eponymous debut album by the free improvisation trio consisting of Jim Baker on piano, Steve Hunt on percussion and Ken Vandermark on reeds. It was recorded in 1993 and released on Okka Disk. By the time of recording, Vandermark and Hunt were members of the NRG Ensemble.

== Reception ==
Professional ratings
Review scores
Source	Rating
AllMusic	3/5 stars
DownBeat	3/5 stars
The Penguin Guide to Jazz	3.5/4 stars

In his review for AllMusic, Alain Drouot states that "the music is extremely dense, despite the fact that the session only involves a trio and the musicians avidly seek to fill all the spaces ... Despite its shortcomings, Caffeine manages to sustain the listener's interest due to, in particular, Hunt's and Baker's attention to details."

The Penguin Guide to Jazz notes that "with Baker and Hunt, Vandermark is slightly too exposed."

The Chicago Tribune review by Howard Reich states that "Baker's restless pianism, Vandermark's penetrating reed work and Hunt's meticulous percussion perpetually react to one another in unexpected, novel ways."

The DownBeat review by Bill Shoemaker states: "Caffeine provides high-energy blow-outs followed by explorations of space and color. Baker's first recorded outing is appetite-whetting, as he skillfully skirts Taylor's long shadow."

== Track listing ==
All compositions by Baker/Hunt/Vandermark

1. "Two Car Garage" – 16:14
2. "Landscape on the Events Horizon" – 46:58
3. "Beyond the Gum Wrapper" – 9:46

== Personnel ==
- Jim Baker – piano
- Steve Hunt – percussion
- Ken Vandermark – reeds
