= Leaning House =

Defunct American independent jazz record label based in Dallas, Texas

Leaning House Records
- Founded: 1994
- Founder: Mark Elliott; Keith Foerster
- Defunct: 1999
- Status: Inactive
- Genre: Jazz
- Country of origin: United States
- Location: Dallas, Texas

Leaning House Records was an American independent record label based in Dallas, Texas, specializing primarily in jazz music. Founded in 1994 by Mark Elliott and Keith Foerster, the label operated until 1999.

During its five years of activity, Leaning House Records released recordings by notable jazz artists including Earl Harvin, Shelley Carroll, Wessell Anderson, Donald Edwards, Fred Sanders, and the Fantastic Voices of Harmony.

Despite critical acclaim for some of its releases, the label ceased operations in 1999 due to financial challenges. Founder Mark Elliott attributed the closure to the relatively small market share of jazz albums within the broader music industry.

== Discography ==
All releases on Leaning House Records (catalog numbers BB001–BB010):

- BB001 – Marchel Ivery – Marchel's Mode (1994)
- BB002 – Earl Harvin – Trio/Quartet (1996)
- BB003 – Shelley Carroll – Self-Titled (1997)
- BB004 – Marchel Ivery – Meets Joey DeFrancesco (1997)
- BB005 – Earl Harvin / Dave Palmer – Strange Happy (1997)
- BB006 – Fred Sanders – East of Vilbig (1997)
- BB007 – Donald Edwards – In the Vernacular (1998)
- BB008 – Wessell Anderson – Live at the Village Vanguard (1998)
- BB009 – Earl Harvin Trio – At the Gypsy Tea Room (1998)
- BB010 – Marchel Ivery – 3 (1999)

=== Unreleased ===
- Bedhead – Untitled Collection of Jazz Standards (1995)

== Bibliography ==
- Leaning House Poetry Vol. 1: A Compact Disk Anthology with Readings by the Poets (Dallas Leaning House Press, 1996). OCLC 328906962. ISBN 978-0-9651118-0-5.
