= 1921 in jazz =

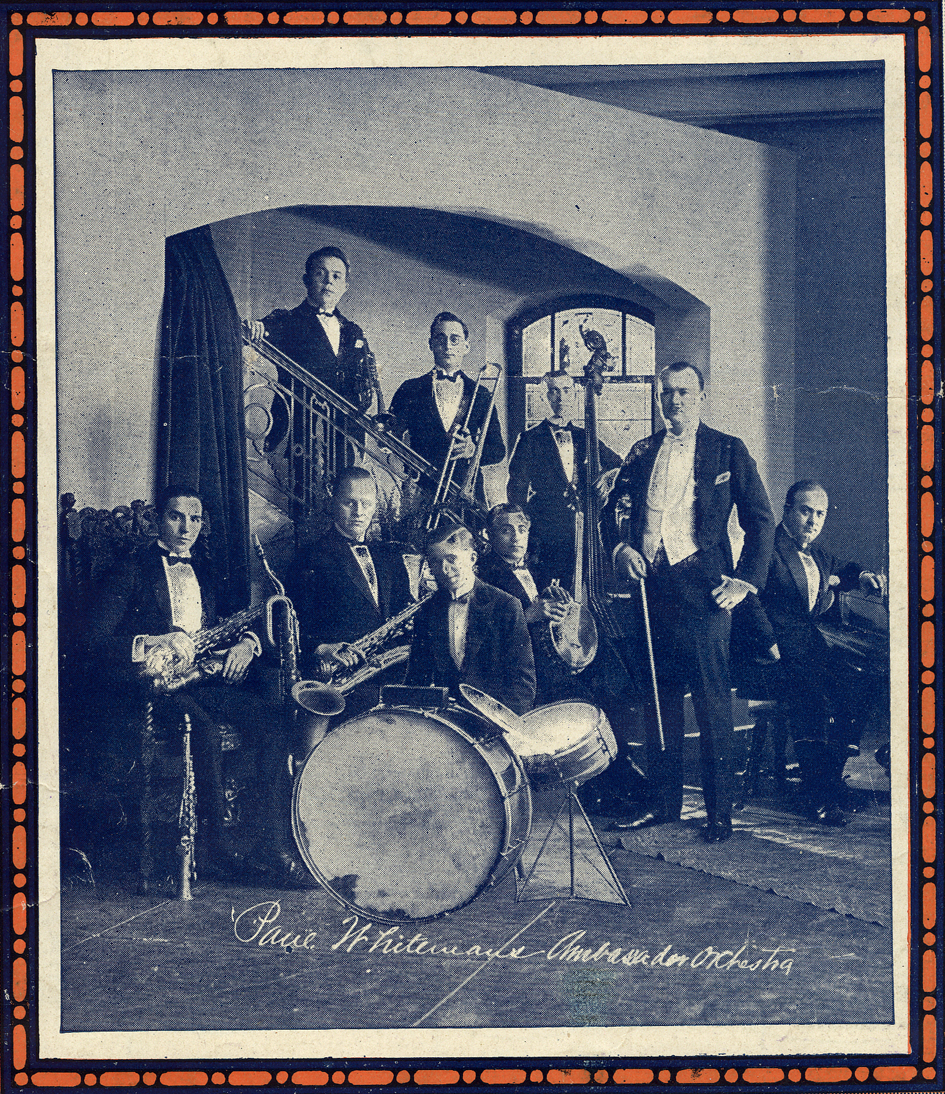
- Paul Whiteman and orchestra in 1921
- Decade: 1920s in jazz
- Music: 1921 in music
- Standards: List of 1920s jazz standards
- See also: 1920 in jazz – 1922 in jazz

This is a timeline documenting events of Jazz in the year 1921.

Musicians born that year included Humphrey Lyttelton and Eddie Calhoun.

== Events ==
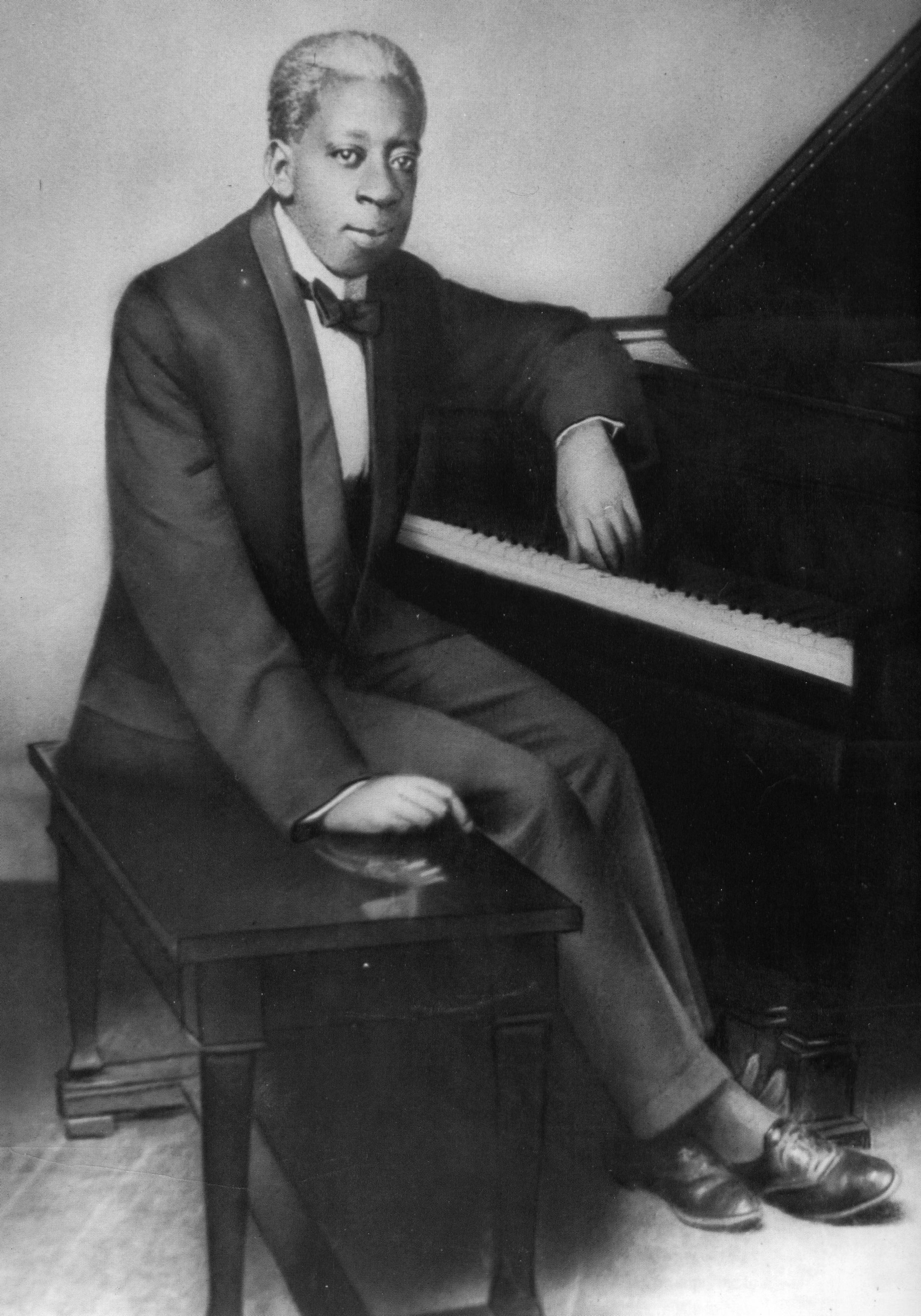
Tony Jackson, seated at piano

- Bix Beiderbecke attended the Lake Forest Academy near Chicago, and got the opportunity to learn about the New Orleans and Chicago Jazz.
- Frankie Trumbauer worked for Isham Jones at the College Inn in Chicago.
- Sidney Bechet returns from his trip to Europe, and musicians like Duke Ellington become aware of his abilities.
- Fletcher Henderson is on the road with Ethel Waters. He hears Armstrong for the first time and immediately offers him a job. Armstrong turns him down.
- James P. Johnson starts approaching jazz with the recording of "Worried and Lonesome Blues" and "Carolina Shout". He becomes a pioneer of stride piano with these recordings.
- Saxophonist Coleman Hawkins joined the Mamie Smith's Jazz Hounds.
- Lennie Tristano takes an interest in piano at the age of two years.

== Standards ==
- In 1921 the main standard published was "The Sheik of Araby".

== Deaths ==
April

- 20 – Tony Jackson, American pianist, singer, and composer (born 1882).

== Births ==
January

- 20 – Connie Haines, American singer (died 2008).
- 22 – André Hodeir, French violinist (died 2011).
- 30 – Bernie Leighton, American pianist (died 1994).
- 31 – John Anderson, American trumpeter (died 1974).

February

- 12 – Hans Koller, Austrian tenor saxophonist and bandleader (died 2003).
- 13 – Wardell Gray, American tenor saxophonist (died 1955).

March

- 1 – Kenny Baker, English trumpeter (died 1999).
- 11 – Astor Piazzolla, Argentine tango composer, bandoneon player (died 1992).
- 15 – Vinnie Burke, American bassist (died 2001).
- 19 – Harry Babasin, American bassist (died 1988).
- 20 – Jimmy Coe, American saxophonist (died 2004).
- 26 – Joe Loco, American pianist and arranger (died 1988).

April

- 3 – Earl Washington, American pianist (died 1975).
- 7 – Al Hayse, American trombonist (died 1982).
- 13 – Dona Ivone Lara, Brazilian samba singer (died 2018).
- 22 – Candido Camero, Cuban conga and bongo player (died 2020).
- 26
  - Jimmy Giuffre, American clarinet and saxophone player (died 2008).
  - Preston Love, American saxophonist (died 2004).

May

- 6 – Freddy Randall, American trumpeter and bandleader (died 1999).
- 20 – Jimmy Henderson, American trombonist and bandleader (died 1995).
- 22 – Gustav Brom, Czech big band leader and clarinetist (died 1995).
- 23 – Humphrey Lyttelton, English trumpeter (died 2008).
- 28 – Al Tinney, American pianist (died 2002).
- 31 – Alan Clare, British jazz pianist (died 1993).

June

- 2
  - Ernie Royal, American trumpeter (died 1983).
  - Marty Napoleon, American pianist (died 2015).
- 7 – Tal Farlow, American guitarist (died 1998).
- 15 – Erroll Garner, American pianist and composer (died 1977).
- 17 – Tony Scott, American clarinetist (died 2007).

July

- 9 – Irv Kluger, American drummer (died 2006).
- 17
  - George Barnes, American guitarist (died 1977).
  - Mary Osborne, American guitarist (died 1992).
- 24 – Billy Taylor, American pianist and composer (died 2010).

August

- 4
  - Herb Ellis, American guitarist (died 2010).
  - Pat Friday, American singer (died 2016).
- 6 – Buddy Collette, American flautist, saxophonist, and clarinetist (died 2010).
- 7 – Warren Covington, American big band trombonist (died 1999).
- 21 – Dennis Berry, English musician and composer (died 1994).
- 28 – Tony Aless, American pianist (died 1988).

September

- 3 – Cab Kaye, English singer, pianist, and bandleader (died 2000).
- 8 – Norris Turney, American flautist and saxophonist (died 2001).
- 15 – Gene Roland, American composer and musician (died 1982).
- 16 – Jon Hendricks, American lyricist and singer (died 2017).
- 20
  - Bill DeArango, American guitarist (died 2005).
  - Chico Hamilton, American drummer and bandleader (died 2013).
- 29 – Franny Beecher, American guitarist (died 2014).

October

- 3 – Leon Breeden, American clarinetist and saxophonist (died 2010).
- 4 – Shifty Henry, American bassist (died 1958).
- 10
  - Julius Watkins, American French hornist (died 1977).
  - Monk Montgomery, American bass guitarist (died 1982).
  - Roy Kral, American pianist and singer (died 2002).
- 18 – Willy Andresen, Norwegian pianist orchestra leader (died 2016).
- 28 – Chico O'Farrill, Cuban composer and conductor (died 2001).

November

- 13 – Eddie Calhoun, American upright bassist (died 1993).
- 20 – Norman O'Connor, American pianist (died 2003).
- 23 – Jack Marshall, American guitarist, conductor, and composer (died 1973).

December

- 1 – John Bunch, American pianist (died 2010).
- 26 – Steve Allen, American singer, songwriter, and television personality (died 2000).
- 31 – Simon Brehm, Swedish upright bassist (died 1967).

== See also ==
- 1921 in music
