= Gilbert Castellanos =

Mexican-born American musician (born 1972)

Gilbert Castellanos (born 1972) is an American jazz trumpeter, bandleader, educator, composer, and arranger based in San Diego, California. He was born in Guadalajara, Mexico. He is a former member of the Black Note, the Tom Scott Quintet, the Anthony Wilson Nonet, the Charles McPherson Quintet, and the Willie Jones III Quintet. He is a current member of the Clayton-Hamilton Jazz Orchestra.

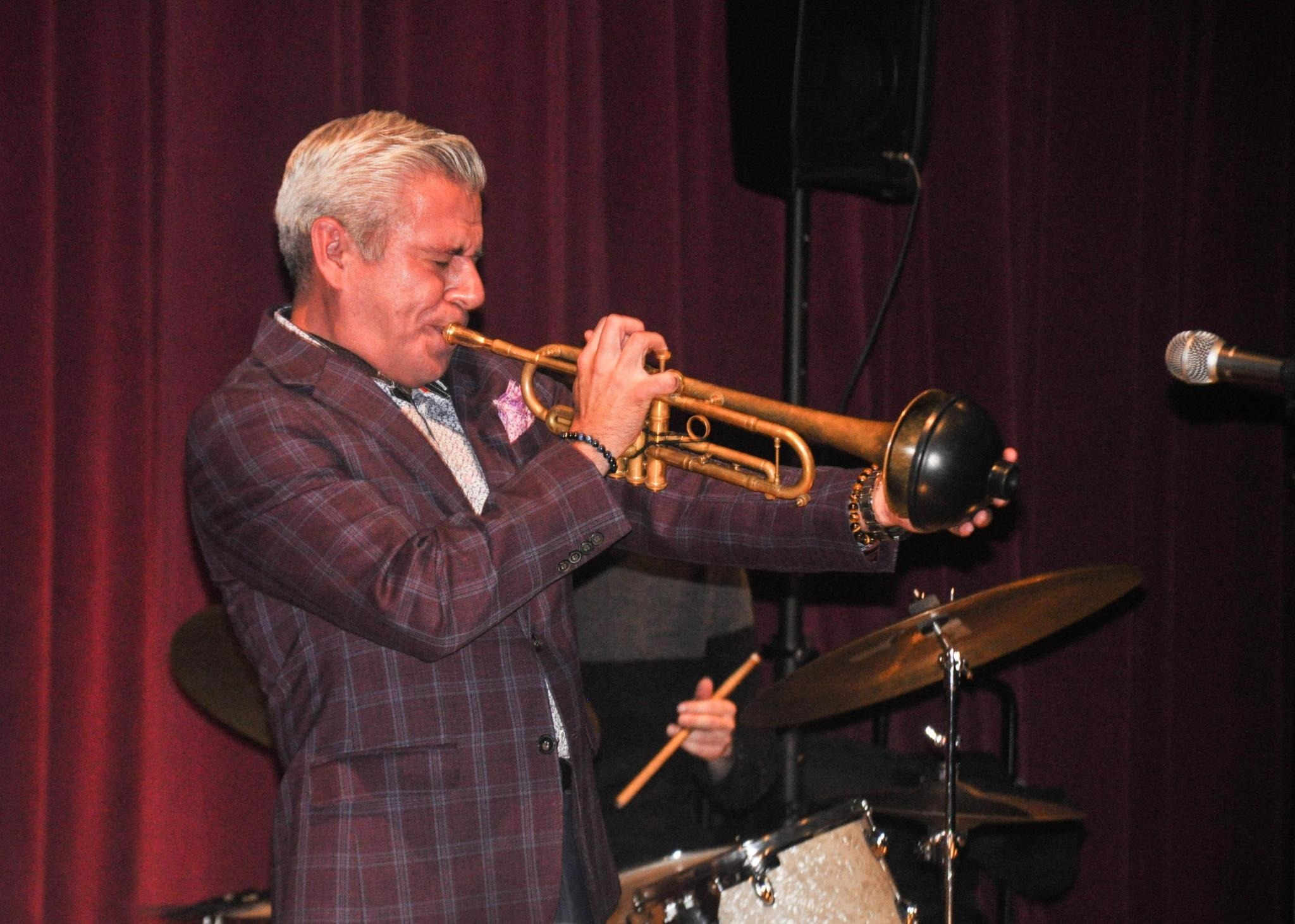

== Career ==
Castellanos was influenced by his father, who performed as leader, singer, and arranger of the popular cumbia band, Gil Castellanos y Su Copacabana. Raised in Fresno, the younger Castellanos took up the trumpet at age 6 and began to play professionally at 11. At 15 he performed at the Monterey Jazz Festival with trumpeter Dizzy Gillespie. He earned a scholarship to Boston's Berklee College of Music, and then attended the California Institute of the Arts in Los Angeles, California. His influences include Clifford Brown, Lee Morgan, and Freddie Hubbard.

The young Castellanos quickly rose to national attention as a member of the band Black Note, with whom he recorded three albums: L.A. Underground, Jungle Music, and Nothin' but the Swing. They won first prize at the John Coltrane Young Artist Competition in 1991. Castellanos also has recorded his own well-received albums: a 1999 debut release, The Gilbert Castellanos Hammond B3 Quartet; an eclectic 2006 collection, Underground; and The Federal Jazz Project (from the theatrical collaboration with playwright Richard Montoya).

Castellanos has worked with artists such as Dizzy Gillespie, Quincy Jones, Wynton Marsalis, Horace Silver, Christian McBride, Lewis Nash, Oscar Hernandez, Les McCann, Diana Krall, Willie Nelson, Michael Bublé, and Natalie Cole.

=== Critical reception ===
The Los Angeles Times has written that "[Castellanos] plays with élan, evincing a more individual, ever-large sound offering hard swinging, often ear-grabbing solos ... [proving] that music with deep roots in jazz's glorious '50s and '60s can sound completely contemporary today."

The June 2007 issue of Downbeat Magazine cited Castellanos as one of the "Top 25 Trumpeters of the Future". In 2017, Castellanos was the recipient of the Jazz Journalists Association's Jazz Hero Award. In his chosen hometown of San Diego, Castellanos was named Best Jazz Artist for the sixth time at the 2017 San Diego Music Awards (SDMA). (Other years include 2015, 2014, 2013, 2002, and 2001.) Castellanos was also recognized by the SDMA as Artist of the Year in 2013, the first time in 25 years a jazz performer received the award. SDMA also named both Castellanos's Underground (2006) and The Federal Jazz Project (2013) recordings as Jazz Albums of the Year.

In 2016, he was named Best Jazz Band/Musician in the San Diego CityBeat magazine's annual reader's poll. The San Diego Theater Critics selected Castellanos as the recipient of the Craig Noel Award for "Outstanding Musical Performance in a Play" for his work in musical play, "The Federal Jazz Project", staged by the San Diego Repertory Theatre.

=== Community and collaboration ===
Castellanos uses every opportunity he has to introduce jazz to his community, forming partnerships and collaborations with major arts and music organizations. According to San Diego musician and music critic Bart Mendoza, "San Diego has had many jazz legends call San Diego home, but few have been as vital to San Diego's music community as Gilbert [Castellanos] continues to be for local jazz... [H]is combos never fail to conjure up some of the best jazz San Diego has ever produced."

Since 2015 Castellanos has been the artistic curator both of Jazz @ the Jacobs and Bayside Summer Nights Thursday Night Jazz, both highly successful San Diego Symphony jazz series. As such he has brought in some of the biggest stars of the jazz world — such as Diane Reeves, Gregory Porter, Eric Reed, Roy McCurdy, Helen Sung, and Chucho Valdes — to Jacobs Music Center in downtown San Diego.

Other partnerships include the San Diego Museum of Art-Portraits in Jazz, a concert series that will introduce the American art form to SDMA's international members and supporters; San Diego Repertory Theater ("Federal Jazz Project"); and the San Diego Museum of Art "Portraits in Jazz" series.

He also has hosted the longest-running weekly jazz jam session in San Diego at Panama 66 at the San Diego Museum of Art. Here, Castellanos gives up-and-coming players a chance to perform with seasoned professionals. A passionate advocate of formal jazz education, Castellanos is the Founder, Artistic Director and Curator of the Young Lions Jazz Conservatory based in San Diego. He established The Young Lions Series, a two-hour weekly program featuring up-and-coming middle and high school jazz musicians from Southern California, many of whom he has taught and mentored. To date he has hosted more than 160 programs, highlighting more than 250 young musicians in the series.

Before leaving to focus on the Young Lions, Castellanos served from 2014 to 2016 as Artistic Director of and faculty member at the International Academy of Jazz. He also conducts high school workshops and is a lecturer at the University of Southern California's Thornton School of Music.

== Personal life ==
Gilbert continues to reside in San Diego with his wife Mariana Castellanos, stepson Eli and his dog, Parker, a Doberman Pinscher who was rescued from a parking lot and bears the name of iconic Jazz musician, Charlie Parker. He can be seen leading a regular Wednesday night Jam Session with Students from his Young Lions Jazz Conservatory and local/guest musicians at Balboa Park's Panama 66, located in the San Diego Museum of Art's Auditorium, accessed through the Sculpture Garden.
