= The Ways of Warmdaddy =

Studio album by Wessell Anderson
- Released: 1996
- Recorded: 1995
- Genre: Jazz
- Label: Atlantic
- Producer: Billy Banks

Wessell Anderson chronology
Warmdaddy in the Garden of Swing (1994)	The Ways of Warmdaddy (1996)	Live at the Village Vanguard (1998)

The Ways of Warmdaddy is the second album by the American musician Wessell Anderson, released in 1996. The album title refers to Wynton Marsalis's nickname for Anderson; Anderson started with Marsalis's bands. Anderson supported the album with a North American tour.

== Production ==
Produced by Billy Banks, the album was recorded in New Orleans in the summer of 1995. Anderson wrote six of its eight tracks. The Ways of Warmdaddy includes versions of Duke Ellington's "Mood Indigo" (as a solo saxophone piece for Anderson) and "Rockin' in Rhythm". Ellis Marsalis played piano on some tracks.

== Critical reception ==
Professional ratings
Review scores
Source	Rating
AllMusic	3/5 stars
The Encyclopedia of Popular Music	3/5 stars
Los Angeles Times	2.5/4 stars
MusicHound Jazz: The Essential Album Guide	3.5/5 stars
The Penguin Guide to Jazz on CD	3/4 stars

The New York Times wrote that "Anderson can be an extraordinarily intelligent and original improviser... On a number called 'Change of Heart Blues', for instance, his playing brims with odd phrases and clever rhythm play, resulting in a solo that is as memorable as a good melody." The Los Angeles Times determined that "Anderson hasn't yet discovered a way to bring structure and follow-through to his solos, which tend to be undeniably dazzling arrays of rapid-fire runs."

The Fort Worth Star-Telegram stated that "the funk and flavor of New Orleans surround every husky note and bedeviling phrase young altoist Anderson blows." The Boston Herald called Anderson "both a sensitive accompanist and intrepid soloist."

AllMusic deemed the album "a hard-bop (re)hash, well-played, yet tasting a bit like it's been microwaved back to life—a moderately tasty and almost immediately forgettable side dish."

== Track listing ==
No.	Title	Length
1.	"Sunday Soulful Supper"
2.	"Change of Heart Blues"
3.	"Rockin' in Rhythm"
4.	"Desimonae"
5.	"The Skating Rink"
6.	"Ron Green's DC Kitchen"
7.	"Baton Rouge Blues"
8.	"Mood Indigo"
