= The Bouncer (album) =

Studio album by Cedar Walton
- Released: 2011
- Recorded: February 28, 2011
- Studio: Van Gelder Studio, Englewood Cliffs, NJ
- Genre: Jazz
- Length: 54:47
- Label: HighNote; HCD 7223
- Producer: Don Sickler

Cedar Walton chronology
| Song of Delilah: The Music of Victor Young (2010) | The Bouncer (2011) |

The Bouncer is the final studio album by pianist Cedar Walton. It was recorded in 2011 and released on the Highnote label.

== Reception ==
AllMusic reviewed the album stating "The Bouncer, features the journeyman hard bopper leading a fine quintet of like-minded individuals". JazzTimes observed "There’s nothing particularly groundbreaking about anything on the disc, mind you. But listeners looking for new music set solidly in the postbop tradition would be hard-pressed to do better than this". BBC Music noted "Ultimately, this album isn't going to burn any bold new paths in jazz, but it’s a soulful summation made in the still-glowing twilight of an old-faithful’s career".

Professional ratings
Review scores
| Source | Rating |
|---|---|
| AllMusic | 3/5 stars |

== Track listing ==
All compositions by Cedar Walton except where noted

1. "The Bouncer" - 5:26
2. "Lament" (J. J. Johnson) - 9:38
3. "Bell for Bags" - 5:29
4. "Halo" - 5:01
5. "Underground Memoirs" - 7:18
6. "Willie's Groove" - 6:09
7. "Got to Get to the Island" (David Williams) - 9:17
8. "Martha's Prize" - 6:29

== Personnel ==
- Cedar Walton - piano
- Vincent Herring - alto saxophone, tenor saxophone, flute
- Steve Turre - trombone (tracks 1 & 5 only)
- David Williams - bass
- Willie Jones III - drums
- Ray Mantilla - percussion (track 5 only)

=== Production ===
- Don Sickler - producer
- Rudy Van Gelder - engineer
