= Zo (album) =

Studio album by Matthew Shipp
- Released: 1994
- Recorded: May 1993
- Studio: Seltzer Sound, New York
- Genre: Jazz
- Length: 49:55
- Label: Rise Records; 2.13.61

Matthew Shipp chronology
Circular Temple (1992)	Zo (1994)	Critical Mass (1995)

Zo is an album by American jazz pianist Matthew Shipp with bassist William Parker, which was recorded in 1993 and released on the record label Rise Records. The album was reissued in 1997 by the 2.13.61 label, founded by Henry Rollins, in partnership with Thirsty Ear Recordings.

== Music ==
Shipp states that this is a tribute to his favorite modern pianist Andrew Hill. In his book Visions of Jazz: The First Century, Gary Giddins says about Zo, "His duets with the highly original and seemingly omnipresent William Parker, form a suite with a pensive reharmonized "Summertime" as the second of four movements, and Shipp's hammering single notes and his chordal harmonies in part three show how fastidiously he control his material while charting his own course."

== Reception ==
Professional ratings
Review scores
Source	Rating
AllMusic	3/5 stars
The Penguin Guide to Jazz	3/4 stars
(The New) Rolling Stone Album Guide	4/5 stars

In his review for AllMusic, David R. Adler states: "It's a dark, forbidding affair, although the solo piano openings of 'Zo, No. 2' and 'Zo, No. 3,' beautiful in their angularity, provide some breathing room."

The Penguin Guide to Jazz says that "Zo seems more specifically experimental in that Shipp and Parker seem to want to plunge into the darkest (and sometimes the dreariest) corners they can find, deep left-hand chords set on top of juddering bass vamps."

== Track listing ==
All tracks are written by Matthew Shipp except as indicated.

No.	Title	Length
1.	"Zo #1"	10:24
2.	"Summertime (George Gershwin)"	12:01
3.	"Zo #2"	13:28
4.	"Zo #3"	14:02

== Personnel ==
- Matthew Shipp – piano
- William Parker – bass
