= Standard Time, Vol. 5: The Midnight Blues =

Studio album by Wynton Marsalis
- Released: April 28, 1998
- Recorded: September 15 – 18, 1997
- Studio: The Grand Lodge of the Masonic Hall, New York City
- Genre: Jazz
- Length: 75:11
- Label: Columbia
- Producer: Steven Epstein

Wynton Marsalis chronology
Jump Start and Jazz (1997)	Standard Time, Vol. 5: The Midnight Blues (1998)	Live in Swing City: Swingin with the Duke (1999)

Standard Time, Vol. 5: The Midnight Blues is an album by Wynton Marsalis that was released in 1998. The album reached a peak position of number 1 on Billboard 's Top Jazz Albums chart.

== Reception ==
Professional ratings
Review scores
Source	Rating
AllMusic	2/5 stars
The Penguin Guide to Jazz Recordings	3/4 stars

In a review for AllMusic, Leo Stanley wrote that the album "has a lush sound but remains quite idiosyncratic and quietly adventurous in its arrangements. The result is a lovely, albeit minor, addition to Marsalis' rich catalog."

The authors of The Penguin Guide to Jazz Recordings stated: "Marsalis plays with total authority, but the effect is still hard and oddly virginal. 'Glad to Be Unhappy' touches neither end of the spectrum convincingly, and yet as an exercise in controlled articulation it is genuinely awe-inspiring."

C. Michael Bailey of All About Jazz commented: "His technique is flawless and contains the whispers of every major jazz artist he has ever heard... Marsalis... preserves the testament that is mainstream jazz. His passion for the music makes up for his technique over passion in the music."

Writing for Pif Magazine, Jill Hill called the album "a tribute to love, passion, and tenderness," and remarked: "The dazzling control Marsalis has over his material and his flawless technique only add to the intimate sound that reminds the listener of the whispering of new lovers."

In an article for The Washington Post, Mike Joyce described the album as "a series of unabashedly moody performances," and wrote: "Inspired in part by the string-laden recordings made by jazz greats Charlie Parker and Clifford Brown, the music is as accessible as Marsalis's last release, last year's Pulitzer-winning Blood on the Fields, was ambitious."

Writing for Burning Ambulance, Phil Freeman commented: "Though he scales the heights of the trumpet’s range, he also seems to be murmuring phrases to himself a lot of the time... This is the best album in the series after the first, perfectly capturing the sophistication of late 1950s jazz."

Fernando Gonzalez of the Orlando Sentinel stated: "why does The Midnight Blues sound so good and so joyless, so gloomy, so boring?... the tempos are set at a dirgelike pace, and the arranging is so buttoned-down that, rather than sensual, the effect is funereal. Maybe it's the sound of self-importance squeezing the life out of a pretty good trumpet player."

== Track listing ==
Information is from AllMusic and the liner notes.

No.	Title	Writer(s)	Length
1.	"The Party's Over"	Betty Comden, Adolph Green, Jule Styne	6:02
2.	"You're Blasé"	Ord Hamilton, Bruce Sievier	6:36
3.	"After You've Gone"	Henry Creamer, Turner Layton	5:43
4.	"Glad to Be Unhappy"	Richard Rodgers, Lorenz Hart	7:44
5.	"It Never Entered My Mind"	Richard Rodgers, Lorenz Hart	6:04
6.	"Baby Won't You Please Come Home"	Charles Warfield, Clarence Williams	5:25
7.	"Guess I'll Hang My Tears Out to Dry"	Sammy Cahn, Jule Styne	5:55
8.	"I Got Lost in Her Arms"	Irving Berlin	5:03
9.	"Ballad of the Sad Young Men"	Fran Landesman, Thomas Wolf	5:47
10.	"Spring Will Be a Little Late This Year"	Frank Loesser	4:27
11.	"My Man's Gone Now"	George Gershwin, Ira Gershwin, DuBose Heyward	4:32
12.	"The Midnight Blues"	Wynton Marsalis	11:53

== Personnel ==
- Wynton Marsalis – trumpet
- Eric Reed – piano
- Reginald Veal – bass
- Lewis Nash – drums
- string orchestra arranged and conducted by Robert Freedman
