= George Washington Carver High School (Ennis, Texas) =

- Ennis, Texas; United States

Information
- Type: Public high school
- School district: Ennis Independent School District

George Washington Carver High School was a public high school within the Ennis Independent School District in Ennis, Texas, United States. It served as the high school for black students for over 40 years until the public schools were integrated in 1967. The school has since been razed.

== History ==
A month after graduation in 1967, it was announced that the school would be closing and students would be reassigned to Ennis High School. The school board decided to raze the building was made in February 2007, and it was torn down in June, 2007. A new early learning center, also named after George Washington Carver was erected on the site.

== Notable alumni ==
- Marchel Ivery, jazz saxophonist, one of the Texas Tenors
- William Stell, football player in Texas Black Sports Hall of Fame
