= Herlin Riley =

American jazz drummer (born 1957)

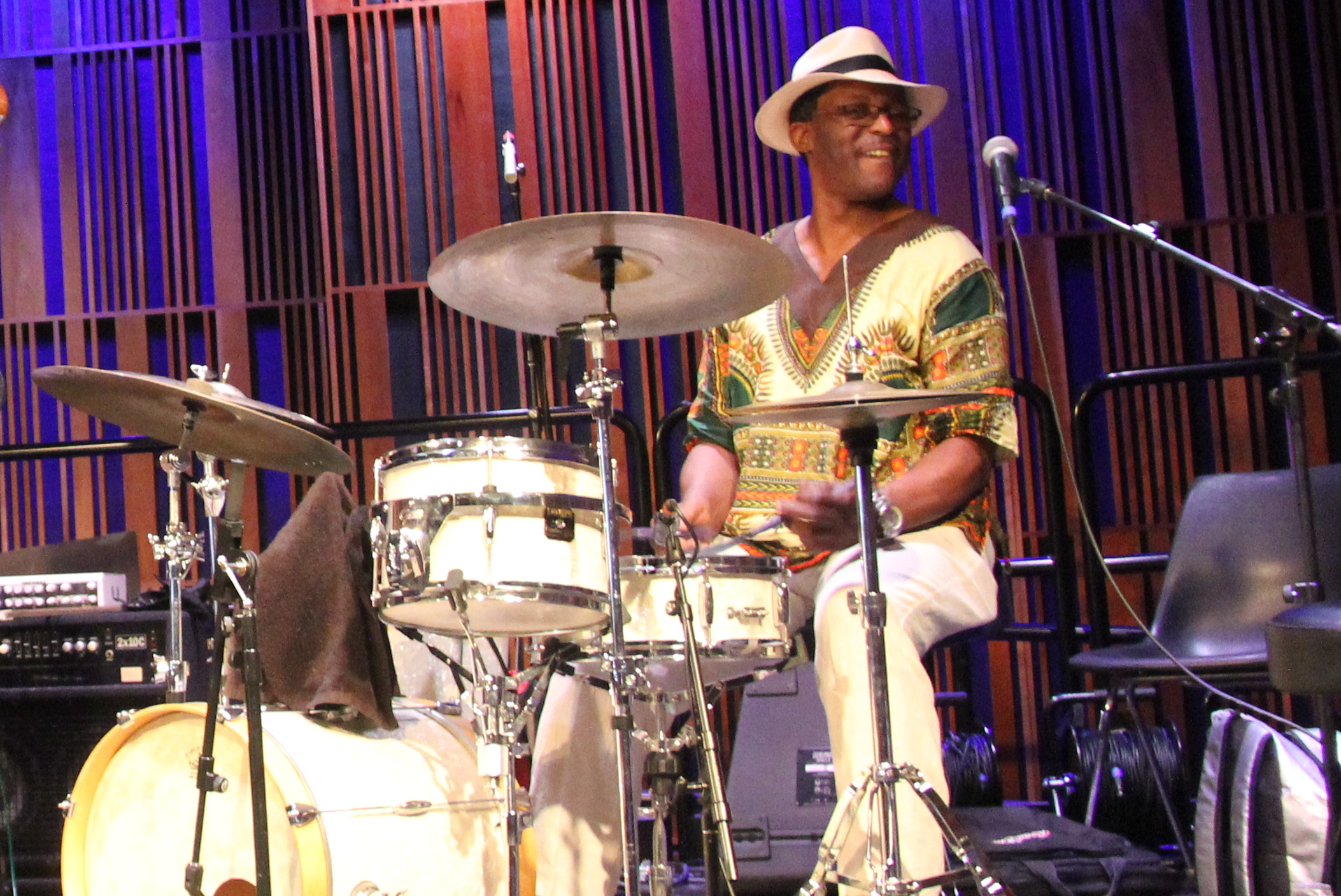
- Herlin Riley plays drums at the New Orleans Jazz Museum on 18 July 2019

Background information
- Born: February 15, 1957 (age 69); New Orleans, Louisiana, U.S.
- Genre: Jazz
- Occupation: Musician
- Instrument: Drums
- Years active: 1984–present
- Labels: Criss Cross, Mack Avenue
- Member of: Lincoln Center Jazz Orchestra

Herlin Riley (born February 15, 1957) is an American jazz drummer and a member of the Lincoln Center Jazz Orchestra led by Wynton Marsalis.

== Life and career ==
A native of New Orleans, Riley started on the drums when he was three. He played trumpet through high school, but he went back to drums in college. After graduating, he spent three years as a member of a band led by Ahmad Jamal. He has worked often with Wynton Marsalis as a member of the Jazz at Lincoln Center Orchestra and of Marsalis's small groups. He has also worked with George Benson, Harry Connick, Jr., and Marcus Roberts.

Riley played a large part in developing the drum parts for Wynton Marsalis's Pulitzer Prize-winning album, Blood on the Fields.

== Discography ==
=== As leader ===
- Watch What You're Doing (Criss Cross, 2000)
- Cream of the Crescent (Criss Cross, 2005)
- New Direction (Mack Avenue, 2016)
- Perpetual Optimism (Mack Avenue, 2019)

=== As sideman ===
With Ahmad Jamal

- Digital Works (Atlantic, 1985)
- Live at the Montreal Jazz Festival 1985 (Atlantic, 1985)
- Rossiter Road (Atlantic, 1986)
- Blue Moon (Jazz Village, 2012)

With Marcus Roberts

- Deep in the Shed (Novus, 1989)

With Dr. Lonnie Smith

- Rise Up! (Palmetto Records, 2008)

With Wynton Marsalis

- 1988 The Majesty of the Blues
- 1988 Uptown Ruler: Soul Gestures in Southern Blue, Vol. 2
- 1990 Crescent City Christmas Card
- 1990 Standard Time, Vol. 2: Intimacy Calling
- 1990 Standard Time, Vol. 3: The Resolution of Romance
- 1990 Tune in Tomorrow
- 1991 Blue Interlude
- 1991 Levee Low Moan: Soul Gestures in Southern Blue, Vol. 3
- 1992 Citi Movement
- 1993 In This House, On This Morning
- 1994 Jazz at Lincoln Center Presents: The Fire of the Fundamentals
- 1994 Jazz at Lincoln Center: They Came to Swing
- 1994 Joe Cool's Blues
- 1996 Jump Start and Jazz
- 1997 Blood on the Fields
- 1999 Big Train
- 1999 Live at the Village Vanguard
- 1999 Live in Swing City: Swingin with the Duke
- 1999 Reeltims
- 1999 Standard Time, Vol. 6: Mr. Jelly Lord
- 1999 The Marciac Suite
- 2000 Selections from the Village Vanguard Box
- 2004 Trios
- 2004 Unforgivable Blackness: The Rise and Fall of Jack Johnson
- 2005 A Love Supreme
- 2005 Don't Be Afraid: The Music of Charles Mingus
- 2005 Higher Ground Hurricane Benefit Relief Concert
- 2006 Cast of Cats
- 2007 Standards & Ballads
- 2009 Christmas Jazz Jam
- 2012 Swinging into the 21st
- 2012 The Music of America
- 2013 The Spiritual Side of Wynton Marsalis

With Bennie Wallace

- 2002 Bennie Wallace In Berlin
