= Points (album) =

Studio album by Matthew Shipp
- Released: 1992
- Recorded: January 14 & March 18, 1990
- Studios: East Side Sound, New York
- Genre: Jazz
- Length: 70:48
- Label: Silkheart
- Producer: Whit Dickey

Matthew Shipp chronology
Sonic Explorations (1988)	Points (1992)	Circular Temple (1992)

Points is an album by American jazz pianist Matthew Shipp recorded in 1990 and released on the Swedish Silkheart label.

== Music ==
Shipp cites the following influences in "Points": Andrew Hill, Duke Ellington, Nina Simone, Hasaan Ibn Ali, Scriabin and Debussy. Other influences are the most adventurous of Herbie Hancock's electronic endeavors, though Shipp himself does not use electronics in any way, the Coltrane's concept of Cosmic Music, and Nefertiti by the Miles Davis Second Quintet. Two painterly influences upon Shipp's work are: Jackson Pollock for his lyricism, space, organic form and body; and Mark Rothko for his chromatic color fields and religious brightness.

"Afro Sonic" was inspired by Randy Weston and utilizes the repetitive thematic pattern of a talking drum as its backbone. Shipp indicates that "Piano Pyramid" is a piece to present the trio in a true tradition as "best exemplified by Bud Powell".

== Reception ==
Professional ratings
Review scores
Source	Rating
AllMusic	2.5/5 stars
The Penguin Guide to Jazz	3/4 stars

In his review for AllMusic, Brian Olewnick states "Shipp would, to some extent, work his way out of this conundrum in ensuing years and fans of his work will want to hear Points at the very least for its historical value but, objectively, it's an inconsistent and not entirely original release."

The Penguin Guide to Jazz says that this album and the next, Circular Temple, "takes some clues from the avant-garde past – Taylor, Bley, and Shipp's personal favorite, Andrew Hill – while going their own way in a quite dramatic fashion moment to moment."

The JazzTimes review by Reuben Jackson states "Skeptics who think so-called 'free' music lacks definable theme and variations would do well to listen to titles like 'Afro Sonic', a gentle yet confident piece of swirling beauty, and 'Piano Pyramid', in which Shipp's lower register work and Parker's bass, dark as shadows, take a sparsely noted theme through rustling variations."

== Track listing ==
All compositions by Matthew Shipp

1. "Points Number Two" – 20:42
2. "Afro Sonic" – 5:37
3. "Piano Pyramid" – 10:05
4. "Points Number One" – 34:24

== Personnel ==
- Matthew Shipp – piano, percussion, conductor
- Rob Brown – alto sax on 1, 2 & 4
- William Parker – bass, percussion
- Whit Dickey – drums, percussion
