= Marchel Ivery =

- Birth name: Marchel Ivery
- Born: September 13, 1938; Ennis, Texas, U.S.
- Died: October 30, 2007 (aged 69); Dallas, Texas, U.S.
- Genres: Jazz, straight-ahead jazz, bebop, hard bop
- Occupation: Musician
- Instrument: Saxophone
- Labels: Leaning House

Marchel Ivery was an American modern jazz saxophonist, known as one of the Texas Tenors.

== History ==
Ivery was born in 1938 in Ennis, Texas. He grew up in a musical family: his siblings were singers and jazz and blues were played constantly. Ivery began with trumpet, but switch to sax in the early 1950s. Ivery joined the army upon graduating from George Washington Carver High School in 1957 and pursued medical training. While assigned to a medical clinic in Paris, France, he sat in with pianist Bud Powell. He returned to the US in 1960 and pursued a musical career, touring with the Bobby Blue Band, Al Braggs, Lightnin' Hopkins, Big Joe Turner, Freddie King, and others. In 1966 he came together with Red Garland, who he worked with extensively from 1975 to 1983.

He did not put out an album under his own name until 1994, at age 56, when he recorded Marchel's Mode, featuring Coltrane pianist Cedar Walton. This record got the recording started, and two more albums soon followed, also introducing Duke Ellington Orchestra saxophonist Shelley Carroll, Fred Sanders, and Earl Harvin.

He served as a mentor to every serious jazz musician to come through Dallas, where he served as bandleader for a quartet at the Recovery Room, frequently with Red Garland. He died of pneumonia on October 30, 2007. Around that time, recordings of Ivery in 1970 surfaced.
