= Thick in the South: Soul Gestures in Southern Blue, Vol. 1 =

Studio album by Wynton Marsalis
- Released: July 30, 1991
- Studio: BMG, New York City
- Genre: Jazz
- Length: 55:59
- Label: Columbia
- Producer: George Butler; Steven Epstein

Wynton Marsalis chronology
Standard Time, Vol. 2: Intimacy Calling (1991)	Thick in the South: Soul Gestures in Southern Blue, Vol. 1 (1991)	Uptown Ruler: Soul Gestures in Southern Blue, Vol. 2 (1991)

Thick in the South: Soul Gestures in Southern Blue, Vol. 1 is an album by Wynton Marsalis that was released in 1991. Part one of the blues cycle was recorded by Marsalis and his quintet with guest appearances by Joe Henderson and Elvin Jones.

== Reception ==
Professional ratings
Review scores
Source	Rating
The Penguin Guide to Jazz Recordings	3.5/4 stars

The AllMusic reviewer indicated that this was the strongest of the three Soul Gestures in Southern Blue albums, but that Marsalis's "five compositions lack any memorable melodies and his own virtuosic solos do not have any distinctive qualities". The Billboard reviewer of all three volumes of Soul Gestures in Southern Blue commented on their "atmosphere of politeness, an absence of swing, and a somewhat shocking lack of true blues feeling".

== Track listing ==
All tracks are written by Wynton Marsalis.

No.	Title	Length
1.	"Harriet Tubman"	7:40
2.	"Elveen"	12:13
3.	"Thick in the South"	10:15
4.	"So This Is Jazz, Huh?"	12:26
5.	"L.C. on the Cut"	13:28

- Track listing adapted from AllMusic.

== Personnel ==
- Wynton Marsalis – trumpet
- Joe Henderson – tenor saxophone
- Marcus Roberts – piano
- Robert Hurst – double bass
- Elvin Jones – drums
- Jeff "Tain" Watts – drums

Production

- George Butler – executive producer
- Steven Epstein – producer
- Dennis Ferrante – engineer
- Tim Geelan – engineer
- Stanley Crouch – liner notes
