= Uptown Ruler: Soul Gestures in Southern Blue, Vol. 2 =

Studio album by Wynton Marsalis
- Released: July 30, 1991
- Studio: BMG, New York City
- Genre: Jazz
- Length: 52:56
- Label: Columbia
- Producer: George Butler

Wynton Marsalis chronology
Thick in the South: Soul Gestures in Southern Blue, Vol. 1 (1991)	Uptown Ruler: Soul Gestures in Southern Blue, Vol. 2 (1991)	Levee Low Moan: Soul Gestures in Southern Blue, Vol. 3 (1991)

Professional ratings
Review scores
Source	Rating
The Penguin Guide to Jazz Recordings	3/4 stars

Uptown Ruler: Soul Gestures in Southern Blue, Vol. 2 is an album by Wynton Marsalis that was released in 1991. It is part two of the three-part blues cycle recorded by Marsalis and his quintet.

== Track listing ==
All tracks are written by Wynton Marsalis except where noted.

No.	Title	Writer(s)	Length
1.	"Psalm 26"		1:29
2.	"Uptown Ruler"		11:11
3.	"The Truth Is Spoken Here"	Marcus Roberts	6:50
4.	"The Burglar"	Todd Williams	8:38
5.	"Prayer"		6:26
6.	"Harmonique"		4:53
7.	"Down Home with Homey"		11:56
8.	"Psalm 26"		1:36

== Personnel ==
- Wynton Marsalis – trumpet
- Reginald Veal – double bass, trombone
- Marcus Roberts – piano, alto saxophone
- Todd Williams – tenor saxophone
- Herlin Riley – double bass, drums

Production

- George Butler – executive producer
- Steven Epstein – producer
- Stanley Crouch – liner notes
