= Leisure (disambiguation) =

Leisure is time spent away from work, domestic chores, and other necessary activities.

Leisure may also refer to:

== Places ==
- Leisure, Indiana
- Leisure, Michigan

== People ==
- David Leisure (born 1950), American actor
- Peter K. Leisure (born 1929), United States federal judge

== Arts, entertainment, and media ==
- Leisure (album), a 1991 album by Blur
- Leisure (band), a band from Auckland, New Zealand
- "Leisure" (poem), a 1911 poem by William Henry Davies
- Leisure (film), a 1976 animated short film
- "Leisure", a 1982 song by XTC from English Settlement

== Companies ==
- Leisure Air, an American charter airline 1992–1995
- Leisure Books, an imprint of Dorchester Publishing
- Leisure International Airways, a British charter airline 1996–1999
