= Blue Interlude =

Studio album by Wynton Marsalis Septet
- Released: May 19, 1992
- Genre: Jazz
- Length: 71:11
- Label: Columbia
- Producer: Steve Epstein

Wynton Marsalis Septet chronology
Baroque Duet (1992)	Blue Interlude (1992)	Citi Movement (1992)

Professional ratings
Review scores
Source	Rating
AllMusic	3.5/5 stars
The Penguin Guide to Jazz Recordings	3.5/4 stars
Rolling Stone	4/5 stars

Blue Interlude is an album by the Wynton Marsalis Septet, released in 1992 by Columbia Records.

== Track listing ==
All songs composed by Wynton Marsalis except where noted

1. "Brother Veal"
2. "Monologue for Sugar Cane and Sweetie Pie"
3. "Blue Interlude"
4. "And the Band Played On" (Wycliffe Gordon, Marsalis)
5. "The Jubilee Suite" (Todd Williams, Marsalis)
6. "Sometimes It Goes Like That"

== Personnel ==
- Wynton Marsalis – trumpet; piano and spoken word (2)
- Reginald Veal – bass
- Herlin Riley – drums
- Marcus Roberts – piano
- Wessel Anderson – alto saxophone
- Todd Williams – tenor saxophone, soprano saxophone, clarinet
- Wycliffe Gordon – trombone
