= Citi Movement (Griot New York) =

Studio album by Wynton Marsalis
- Released: 1993
- Recorded: July 27–28, 1992
- Genre: Jazz
- Length: 122:58
- Label: Columbia

Wynton Marsalis chronology
Blue Interlude (1992)	Citi Movement (Griot New York) (1993)	Portraits by Ellington (1992)

Professional ratings
Review scores
Source	Rating
AllMusic	4/5 stars
The Penguin Guide to Jazz Recordings	4/4 stars
Rolling Stone	4/5 stars

Citi Movement (Griot New York) is an album by jazz trumpeter Wynton Marsalis, released in 1993.

== Track listing ==
All tracks are written by Wynton Marsalis.

Disc One
No.	Title	Length
1.	"Hustle Bustle"	4:36
2.	"City Beat"	10:21
3.	"Daylight Dinosaurs"	3:35
4.	"Down the Avenue"	4:44
5.	"Stop and Go"	5:31
6.	"Nightlife-Highlife (Yas, Yas)"	6:07
7.	"How Long?"	1:05
8.	"I See the Light"	1:34
9.	"I See the Light (instrumental)"	2:10
10.	"Duway Dialogue"	:40
11.	"Dark Heart Beat"	8:17
12.	"Cross Court Capers"	5:37
13.	"Bayou Baroque"	4:13
14.	"Marthaniel"	8:16
15.	"Spring Yaoundé"	6:00

Disc Two
No.	Title	Length
1.	"The End"	3:04
2.	"The Legend of Buddy Bolden"	4:43
3.	"Swingdown, Swingtown"	8:59
4.	"Highrise Riff"	7:04
5.	"Modern Vistas (As Far as the Eye Can See)"	17:19
6.	"Curtain Call"	8:49

== Personnel ==
- Wynton Marsalis – trumpet, arranger, liner notes
- Wycliffe Gordon – trombone
- Wessell Anderson – alto saxophone
- Todd Williams – soprano and tenor saxophone
- Eric Reed – piano
- Reginald Veal – double bass
- Herlin Riley – drums
- Herbert Harris – tenor saxophone
- Marthaniel Roberts – piano

Production

- Ron Carbo – conductor
- Delfeayo Marsalis – producer
- Les Stephenson – engineer
- Patrick Smith – engineer, mixing
- William Johnson – assistant engineer
- Marian Conaty – assistant engineer
- Major Little – assistant engineer
- Earl Martin – assistant engineer
- Stanley Crouch – liner notes
