= Black Note =

American jazz ensemble

Black Note, 1994

Black Note were an American jazz ensemble formed in 1991. The band released four albums, on Columbia Records, Impulse! Records, Red Records and World Stage.

They won first prize at the John Coltrane Young Artist Competition in 1991.

== Discography ==
- 43rd & Degnan (World Stage, 1991)
- L.A. Underground (Red, 1993 [1994])
- Jungle Music (Columbia, 1994)
- Nothin' But The Swing (Impulse!, 1995 [1996])

== Group members ==
- Marcus Shelby - bass
- Willie Jones III - drums
- Eric Reed - piano
- Kenneth Crouch - piano
- Ark Sano - piano
- Richard Grant - trumpet
- Gilbert Castellanos - trumpet
- James Mahone - alto sax
- Phil Vieux - tenor sax
- Robert Stewart - tenor sax

== Guest musicians ==
- Greg Kurstin - piano
- Nicholas Payton - trumpet
- Teodross Avery - tenor sax, soprano sax
