= WJ3 Records =

Independent record label

- Founded: March 14, 2000; 26 years ago
- Founder: Willie Jones III
- Genre: Jazz
- Country of origin: United States
- Location: New York City, New York, U.S.
- Official website: WJ3

WJ3 Records is an American independent jazz record label owned by WJ3 Productions, LLC, registered in New York and based in Brooklyn. The principal is Willie Jones III, a jazz drummer based in Brooklyn. WJ3 Productions was founded March 14, 2000.

== Discography ==
Release Year	Title	Artist	Catalog	Personnel	Recorded	Notes
2000	Vol. 1...Straight Swingin'	Willie Jones III	WJ31001	Sherman Irby (alto sax), James Mahone (alto sax), Eric Reed (piano), Billy Childs (piano), Gerald Cannon (bass), Tony Dumas (bass), Willie Jones III (drums), Dwight Trible (vocal)	1996-1999	
2002	Sakura	Henry Franklin, Steve Katsuyama, Tony Austin	WJ31002	Steve Katsuyama (piano), Henry Franklin (bass), Tony Austin (drums)		
2003	Vol. 2...Don't Knock The Swing	Willie Jones III	WJ31003	Roy Hargrove (trumpet), Steve Davis (trombone), Greg Tardy (tenor sax), Eric Reed (piano), Gerald Cannon (bass), Willie Jones III (drums)	2001-2002	
2004	Acting Up!	The Banda Brothers	WJ31004	Francisco Torres (trombone), Javier Vergara (tenor sax), Chris Barron (keyboards), Tony Banda (bass), Jose DeLeon Jr. (congas), Ramon Banda (drums)		
2006	Volume III	Willie Jones III	WJ31005	Eric Reed (piano), Willie Jones II (piano), Shanti Mathews (guitar), Dwayne Burno (bass), Mike Elizondo (bass), Willie Jones III (drums)	2006	
2007	We 2	Wycliffe Gordon and Eric Reed	WJ31006	Wycliffe Gordon (trombone, vocal), Eric Reed (piano, vocal)	2006	
2009	Stand!	Eric Reed	WJ31007	Eric Reed (piano), Rodney Whitaker (bass), Willie Jones III (drums)	2008	
2010	The Next Phase	Willie Jones III	WJ31008	Steve Davis (trombone), Greg Tardy (tenor sax), Warren Wolf (vibes), Eric Reed (piano), Dezron Douglas (bass), Willie Jones III (drums), Claudia Acuna (vocal), Renee Neufville (vocal)	2009	
2011	Something Beautiful	Eric Reed	WJ31009	Eric Reed (piano), Reuben Rogers (bass), Rodney Green (drums)	2009	
2012	The Cyrus Chestnut Quartet	The Cyrus Chestnut Quartet	WJ31010	Stacy Dillard (tenor sax), Cyrus Chestnut (piano), Dezron Douglas (bass), Willie Jones III (drums)	2010	
2012	In The Spur Of The Moment	Justin Robinson	WJ31011	Roy Hargrove (trumpet), Justin Robinson (alto sax), Larry Willis (piano), Dwayne Burno (bass), Willie Jones III (drums)	2010	
2013	Plays The Max Roach Songbook (Live At Dizzy's Club Coca-Cola)	Willie Jones III Sextet	WJ31012	Jeremy Pelt (trumpet), Steve Davis (trombone), Stacy Dillard (tenor sax), Eric Reed (piano), Dezron Douglas (bass), Willie Jones III (drums)	2012	
2013	Soul Brother Cool	Cyrus Chestnut	WJ31013	Freddie Hendrix (trumpet), Cyrus Chestnut (piano), Dezron Douglas (bass), Willie Jones III (drums)	2013	
2013	When She Smiles	Jacques Lesure	WJ31014	Jacques Lesure (guitar), Eric Reed (piano), Mike Gurrola (bass), Willie Jones III (drums)	2012	
2013	Reflections Of A Grateful Heart	Eric Reed	WJ31015	Eric Reed (piano)	2012	
2015	Camaraderie	Jacques Lesure	WJ31016	Jacques Lesure (guitar), Warren Wolf (vibes), Eric Reed (piano), Nat Reeves (bass), Tony Dumas (bass), Willie Jones III (drums)	2014	
2015	Groundwork	Willie Jones III	WJ31017	Eddie Henderson (trumpet), Steve Davis (trombone), Stacy Dillard (tenor sax), Warren Wolf (vibes), Eric Reed (piano), Buster Williams (bass), Willie Jones III (drums)	2014	
2017	My Point Is...	Willie Jones III	WJ31018	Eddie Henderson (trumpet), Ralph Moore (tenor sax), Eric Reed (piano), Buster Williams (bass), Willie Jones III (drums)	2016	
2017	For The Love Of You	Jacques Lesure	WJ31019	Jacques Lesure (guitar), Eric Reed (piano), Tony Dumas (bass), Willie Jones III (drums)	2016	
2017	A Light In Darkness	Eric Reed	WJ31020	Tim Green (alto sax), Eric Reed (piano), Ben Williams (bass), McClenty Hunter (drums), Jamison Ross (vocals)	2017	
2019	Three Score	Ralph Moore	WJ31021	Ralph Moore (tenor sax), Eric Reed (piano), Gerald Cannon (bass), Willie Jones III (drums)	2016	
2019	At First Light	Justin Robinson	WJ31022	Justin Robinson (sax), Sharp Radway (piano), Ameen Saleem (bass), Jeremy "Bean" Clemons (drums)	2017	
2018	Turquoise Twice	Rick Germanson	WJ31023	Rick Germanson (piano), Gerald Cannon (bass), Willie Jones III (drums)	2018	
2020	Harlem Stories: The Music of Thelonious Monk	Teodross Avery	WJ31024	Teodross Avery (tenor sax), Anthony Wonsey (piano), D.D. Jackson (piano), Willie Jones III (drums), Marvin "Bugalu" Smith (drums)	2020	
2020	Plays The Music of Buddy Montgomery	Isaiah J. Thompson	WJ31025	Isaiah J. Thompson (piano), Philip Norris (bass), Willie Jones III (drums), Daniel Sadownick (percussion)	2019	
2020	If Time Could Stand Still	Gregory Tardy	WJ31026	Alex Norris (trumpet), Gregory Tardy (tenor sax), Keith Brown (piano), Alexander Claffy (bass), Willie Jones III (drums)	2019	
2021	Fallen Heroes	Willie Jones III	WJ31027	Steve Davis (trombone), Sherman Irby (alto sax), Justin Robinson (alto sax), Isaiah J. Thompson (piano), George Cables (piano), Gerald Cannon (bass), Willie Jones III (drums)	2020	
2022	Sufficient Grace	Gregory Tardy	WJ31028	Marcus Printup (trumpet), Gregory Tardy (tenor sax, bass clarinet, clarinet), Keith Brown (piano), Sean Conly (bass), Willie Jones III (drums)	2021	
2023	Resolution	Ken Fowser	WJ31029	Jeremy Pelt (trumpet), Ken Fowser (tenor sax), Peter Bernstein (guitar), Rick Germanson (piano), Gerald Cannon (bass), Willie Jones III (drums)	2023	
2023	In His Timing	Gregory Tardy	WJ31030	Gregory Tardy (clarinet), Regina Carter (violin), Taber Gable (piano), Matthew Parrish (bass), Alvester Garnett (drums)	2022	
2024	Where Is Love	Abena Koomson Davis	WJ31031	Joshua Bruneau (trumpet), Steve Davis (trombone), Mike DiRubbo (tenor sax), Tony Davis (guitar), Rick Germanson (piano), Nat Reaves (bass), Willie Jones III (drums), Abena Koomson Davis (vocals)	2023	WJ31031 catalog number used twice
2024	Where Have I Been All Your Life?	Rachel Gould	WJ31031	Joshua Bruneau (trumpet), Steve Davis (trombone), Ralph Moore (tenor sax), Jon Davis (piano), Jon Burr (bass), Willie Jones III (drums), Rachel Gould (vocals)	2018	WJ31031 catalog number used twice
2025	Abide In Love	Gregory Tardy	WJ31032	Marcus Printup (trumpet), Gregory Tardy (tenor sax, bass clarinet, clarinet), Keith Brown (piano), Sean Conly (bass), Willie Jones III (drums)	2024	
2026	Solid Perspective	Bruce Williams	WJ31033	Bruce Williams (alto sax), Brandon McCune (piano), Lonnie Plaxico (bass), Willie Jones III (drums)	2023	
