= Critical Mass (Matthew Shipp album) =

Studio album by Matthew Shipp
- Released: 1995
- Recorded: September 23, 1994
- Studio: Sorcerer Sound, New York
- Genre: Jazz
- Length: 41:01
- Label: 2.13.61

Matthew Shipp chronology
| Zo (1994) | Critical Mass (1995) | Symbol Systems (1995) |

Critical Mass is an album by American jazz pianist Matthew Shipp which was recorded in 1994 and released on 2.13, a division of the 2.13.61 label, founded by Henry Rollins. Shipp adds violinist Mat Maneri to his usual trio lineup with bassist William Parker and drummer Whit Dickey. Shipp met Maneri when the violinist was just 17 in Boston, this is their first collaboration on record.

== Reception ==
Professional ratings
Review scores
| Source | Rating |
|---|---|
| The New Rolling Stone Album Guide | 3/5 stars |
| The Penguin Guide to Jazz | 3/4 stars |

The Penguin Guide to Jazz states "An interesting record but rather dour work for listener." By contrast, in an article for the Boston Phoenix, Norman Weinstein says about the album "This is the most accomplished recording of Shipp's career, a breathtaking summary of his complex sense of musical form and lava-like flow of unstoppable imagination."

== Track listing ==
All tracks are written by Matthew Shipp.

| No. | Title | Length |
|---|---|---|
| 1. | "Critical Mass" | 10:07 |
| 2. | "Virgin Complex" | 9:11 |
| 3. | "Density and Eucharist" | 21:43 |

== Personnel ==
- Matthew Shipp – piano
- Mat Maneri – violin
- William Parker – bass
- Whit Dickey – drums
