= Pure Imagination (Eric Reed album) =

Studio album by Eric Reed
- Released: 1998
- Recorded: July 28–29, 1997
- Genre: Jazz, Post-bop
- Length: 49:52
- Label: Impulse!/GRP
- Producer: Tommy LiPuma

Eric Reed chronology
Musicale (1996)	Pure Imagination (1998)	Manhattan Melodies (1999)

Professional ratings
Review scores
Source	Rating
Allmusic	4/5 stars

Pure Imagination is a 1998 album by jazz pianist Eric Reed released through Impulse! Records. This album contains reinterpretations (remakes) of traditional pop songs from classic Broadway and Hollywood productions such as Willy Wonka & the Chocolate Factory, Porgy and Bess, A Little Night Music among others. Pure Imagination has peaked at #8 on Billboard's Top Jazz Album charts. All songs are written by famous songwriters of said productions except for the opening and closing tracks composed by Reed himself.

== Track listing ==
1. "Overture"
2. "Maria" (Leonard Bernstein, Richard Rodgers, & Stephen Sondheim)
3. "Hello, Young Lovers" (Rodgers and Hammerstein)
4. "Pure Imagination" (Leslie Bricusse, & Anthony Newley)
5. "42nd Street" (Harry Warren & Al Dubin)
6. "Send in the Clowns" (Stephen Sondheim)
7. "My Man's Gone Now/Gone, Gone, Gone" (DuBose Heyward, George, & Ira Gershwin)
8. "Nice Work If You Can Get It" (George & Ira Gershwin)
9. "You'll Never Walk Alone" (Rodgers and Hammerstein)
10. "I Got Rhythm" (George & Ira Gershwin)
11. "Finale (Last Trip)"

Although lyrics were written for the songs from tracks 2 to 10, these are instrumental recordings.

== Personnel ==
- Eric Reed – Piano
- Brian Bromberg – Bass
- Reginald Veal - Bass
- Gregory Hutchinson - Drums
- Tommy LiPuma – Producer
