= Big Head Eddie =

Studio album by Ken Vandermark
- Released: 1993
- Recorded: February 22 & 23, 1993
- Studio: Acme Recording Studio, Chicago
- Genre: Jazz
- Length: 60:52
- Label: Platypus
- Producer: The Vandermark Quartet

Ken Vandermark chronology
Big Head Eddie (1993)	Caffeine (1994)

Big Head Eddie is the debut album by American jazz reedist Ken Vandermark, which was recorded in 1993 and released on Platypus.

== Background ==
After moving to Chicago in 1989, Vandermark performed with Hal Russell, whom he replaced in punk jazz band The Flying Luttenbachers and free jazz NRG Ensemble. The Vandermark Quartet, with guitarist Todd Colburn, bassist Kent Kessler and drummer Michael Zerang, was his first major group. Kessler was the bassist on the NRG Ensemble since 1985. Big Head Eddie was Vandermark's first CD as a leader after some obscure recordings with Fourth Stream, Lombard Street and the duo with Curt Newton Concert for Jimmy Lyons, only released on cassette.

== Reception ==
Professional ratings
Review scores
Source	Rating
AllMusic	4/5 stars
The Penguin Guide to Jazz	3/4 stars

In his review for AllMusic, Thom Jurek states: "This is a stunning debut, and a high sign that musically everything was about to get very interesting."

The Penguin Guide to Jazz notes that "Big Head Eddie is a nifty set of tunes, sparked by Colburn's scrawling guitar lines, lurid and alive if not quite focused yet."

== Track listing ==
All compositions by Ken Vandermark except as indicated

1. "Kiss the Plow" – 4:53
2. "Exploding Note Theory" – 6:44
3. "Dog Cliches" – 4:35
4. "Jack Kirby Was Ripped Off" – 5:31
5. "Last Date" – 6:27
6. "Blue Coffee" (Todd Colburn) – 3:56
7. "Ingrid's Napkin #29" (Michael Zerang) – 12:06
8. "Courtesy Desk" – 5:15
9. "Sinner Sinner" (Kent Kessler) – 7:29
10. "Not Actual Size" – 3:56

== Personnel ==
- Ken Vandermark – reeds
- Todd Colburn – guitar
- Kent Kessler – bass
- Michael Zerang – drums
