= Jessica Williams (musician) =

American jazz pianist and composer (1948–2022)

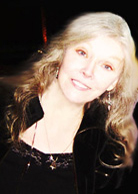
- Williams in 2007

Background information
- Born: March 17, 1948; Baltimore, Maryland, U.S.
- Died: March 10, 2022 (aged 73)
- Genres: Jazz, Electronic
- Occupation: Musician
- Instruments: Piano, Synthesizers, Trap Drums, B3 Organ, Contrabass
- Years active: 1970s–2010s
- Labels: Red and Blue, Candid, Concord, Maxjazz, Timeless, Hep, Jazz Focus

Jessica Jennifer Williams (March 17, 1948 – March 10, 2022) was an American jazz pianist and composer.

== Early life ==
Williams was born in Baltimore, Maryland, on March 17, 1948. She started playing the piano at age four, began music lessons with a private teacher at five, and at age seven was enrolled into the Peabody Preparatory. She studied classical music and ear training with Richard Aitken and George Bellows at the Peabody Conservatory of Music.

At age twelve, Williams was listening to Dave Brubeck, Miles Davis, and Charles Mingus. She began performing jazz in her teens, playing with Richie Cole, Buck Hill, and Mickey Fields. In a radio interview with Marian McPartland on NPR's Piano Jazz from 1992, she stated that her main influences were not pianists, but reed and brass players such as John Coltrane and Miles Davis.

According to her own words, "I was just a problem when it came to authority" and this carried over to her professional life as she developed her own style of playing, as heard on her version of "Getting Sentimental Over You", where she would strum the strings inside the piano itself, a clear way for her to break convention.

== Musical career ==
In June 1976, Williams began performing regularly with the "Philly Joe" Jones band in New Jersey, and with Lex Humphries in Philadelphia and New York City, before moving to the West Coast in October 1976.

In 1977, Williams moved to San Francisco, where she played in house bands at the Keystone Korner. She worked with Eddie Harris, Tony Williams, Stan Getz, Bobby Hutcherson, and Charlie Haden, eventually leading her own jazz trio, and recording regularly for several decades.

In 1997, Williams established her own record label, Red and Blue Recordings. She also started her publishing company, JJW Music/ASCAP, and an internet mail order business.

Williams appeared at the 2004 and 2006 "Mary Lou Williams Women in Jazz Festival" at the John F. Kennedy Center for the Performing Arts in Washington, D.C. She also appeared in festivals and venues worldwide, including The Purcell Room in London, The Bern Jazz Festival, The Monterey Jazz Festival, The New Morning in Paris, Spivey Hall in Georgia, and hundreds of other venues. She was a guest on NPR's Fresh Air with Terry Gross, and Marian McPartland's Piano Jazz on NPR, as well as an appearance at the Brecon Jazz Festival in Wales, which was filmed by the BBC, she was however "disappointed when only a fifteen minute segment was shown and her attempts to get the material for her own use were unsuccessful".

== Personal life ==
Williams was transgender and had gender-affirming surgery at 28 years old. In 2012, Williams had a spinal fusion with internal instrumentation at Swedish Hospital's Neurosurgery Unit in Seattle, Washington, and due to the medical procedures and recovery being lengthy, complicated and expensive, she ended up having to sell her beloved Yamaha piano. She lived with her husband Duncan Atherton in the Pacific Northwest, and no longer toured. She continued to make new music, including electronic music and neoclassical music, and remained a lifelong advocate of civil rights.

== Death ==
Williams died on March 10, 2022, at age 73. Shortly thereafter, her husband opened a now closed Go Fund Me page to recover from the funerary and medical expenses.

== Awards and honors ==
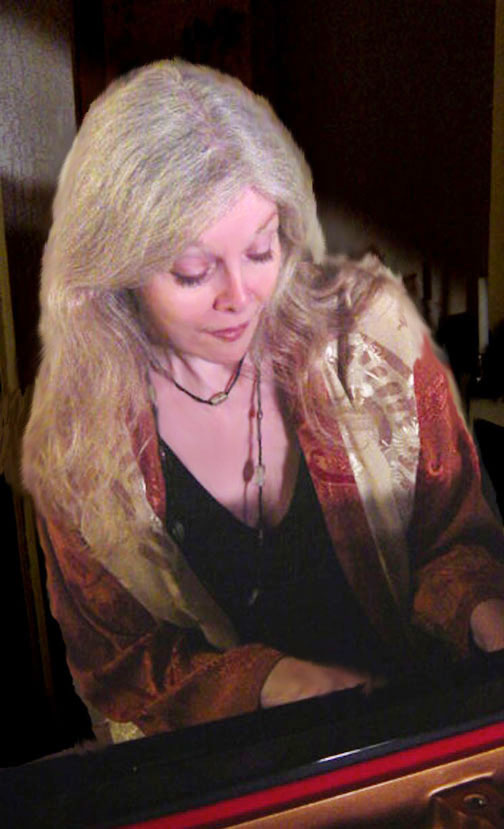
Williams from the album cover for The Real Deal (photo by E Arc)

- Grammy nomination, Nothin' But the Truth, 1986
- Grammy nomination, Live at Yoshi's, Vol. 1, 2004
- Grant, National Endowment for the Arts
- Grant, Rockefeller Foundation, 1989
- Grant, Alice B. Toklas Grant for Women Composers, 1992
- Guggenheim Fellowship, 1995
- Keys to the City, Sacramento, California
- Keys to the City, San Mateo, California
- Artist of the Year, Santa Cruz County, California, 2002
- Jazz Record of the Year, Jazz Journal International Reader's Poll

== Selected discography ==
- 1976 Portal of Antrim (Adelphi)
- 1978 Portraits (Adelphi)
- 1979 Orgonomic Music (Clean Cuts)
- 1980 Rivers of Memory (Clean Cuts)
- 1982 Update featuring Eddie Harris (Clean Cuts)
- 1986 Nothin' But the Truth (BlackHawk)
- 1990 And Then, There's This (Timeless)
- 1992 Live at Maybeck Recital Hall, Vol. 21 (Concord Jazz)
- 1993 Next Step (Hep)
- 1993 Arrival (Jazz Focus)
- 1994 Momentum featuring Dick Berk and Jeff Johnson (Jazz Focus)
- 1994 Song That I Heard (Hep)
- 1994 In the Pocket (Hep)
- 1994 Encounters featuring Leroy Vinnegar (Jazz Focus)
- 1995 Inventions (Jazz Focus)
- 1995 Joy featuring Hadley Caliman (Jazz Focus)
- 1995 Intuition (Jazz Focus)
- 1996 Gratitude (Candid)
- 1996 Jessica's Blues featuring Jay Thomas, Mel Brown and Dave Captein (Jazz Focus)
- 1996 Victoria Concert (Jazz Focus)
- 1997 Higher Standards (Candid)
- 1998 Encounters, Vol. 2 featuring Leroy Vinnegar (Jazz Focus)
- 1998 Joyful Sorrow: A Solo Tribute to Bill Evans (BlackHawk)
- 1999 In the Key of Monk (Jazz Focus)
- 1999 Ain't Misbehavin' (Candid)
- 2000 Jazz in the Afternoon (Candid)
- 2000 Blue Fire (Jazz Focus)
- 2001 I Let a Song Go Out of My Heart (Hep)
- 2001 Some Ballads, Some Blues (Jazz Focus)
- 2002 This Side Up featuring Victor Lewis and Ray Drummond (Maxjazz)
- 2003 All Alone (Maxjazz)
- 2004 Live at Yoshi's, Vol. 1 featuring Victor Lewis and Ray Drummond (Maxjazz)
- 2004 The Real Deal (Hep)
- 2005 Live at Yoshi's, Vol. 2 featuring Victor Lewis and Ray Drummond (Maxjazz)
- 2006 Billy's Theme: A Tribute to Dr. Billy Taylor (Origin)
- 2007 Unity (Red and Blue)
- 2008 Songs for a New Century (Origin)
- 2009 The Art of the Piano (Origin)
- 2010 Touch (Origin)
- 2011 Freedom Trane (Origin)
- 2012 Songs of Earth (Origin)
- 2014 With Love (Origin)
- 2025 Blue Abstraction: Prepared Piano Project 1985–1987 (Pre-Echo Press)

With Charlie Rouse

- Epistrophy (Landmark, 1989)
