= Circular Temple =

Studio album by Matthew Shipp
- Released: 1992
- Recorded: October 16, 1990
- Studio: Seltzer Sound, New York
- Genre: Jazz
- Length: 46:03
- Label: Quinton; Infinite Zero
- Producer: Matthew Shipp, Whit Dickey

Matthew Shipp chronology
Points (1992)	Circular Temple (1992)	Zo (1994)

Circular Temple is an album by American jazz pianist Matthew Shipp featuring his trio with bassist William Parker and drummer Whit Dickey, which was recorded in 1990 and released on the tiny label Quinton Records. The album was reissued in 1994 by Infinite Zero, a label founded by Henry Rollins and Rick Rubin to re-release out-of-print records, which was a division of American Recordings, under the umbrella of Warner Bros. Records. It will be reissued on CD and, for the first time, on vinyl in 2023 on ESP-Disk'.

== Music ==
Circular Temple is a suite for piano, bass and drums in four movements. The second movement, subtitled "Monk's Nighmare", is referred to by Dickey as a "bop extravaganza". According to David Fricke, "the opening keyboard motif finds the pianist twisting a riff marriage of Bud Powell's 'Dance of the Infidels' and Thelonious Monk's 'Well, You Needn't'." The third movement is a duet between Parker and Dickey. The fourth and final movement begins with a piano solo section.

In his book Visions of Jazz: The First Century, Gary Giddins says "If you think there's nothing to be done with Monk but play his tunes, listen to parts two and four of Shipp's Circular Temple, in which he adduces his own Monkian theme with percussive certainty."

== Reception ==
Professional ratings
Review scores
Source	Rating
The Penguin Guide to Jazz	3.5/4 stars
(The New) Rolling Stone Album Guide	3.5/5 stars

The Penguin Guide to Jazz wrote that this album and the previous one, Points, "takes some clues from the avant-garde past – Taylor, Bley, and Shipp's personal favorite, Andrew Hill – while going their own way in a quite dramatic fashion moment to moment."

The album garnered a lead review in Rolling Stone by David Fricke, who wrote: "Even at his most extreme, as in the tidal waves of block-chord fury in "Circular Temple #1" Shipp never resorts to cheap anarchy, preferring the rigorously sculpted discord that Jimi Hendrix aspired to on the guitar."

The 2023 reissue was received as "daringly incongruous yet hypnotically accessible."

== Track listing ==
All compositions by Matthew Shipp

1. "Circular Temple #1" – 6:26
2. "Circular Temple #2 (Monk's Nightmare)" – 10:00
3. "Circular Temple #3" – 3:47
4. "Circular Temple #4" – 25:50

== Personnel ==
- Matthew Shipp – piano
- William Parker – bass
- Whit Dickey – drums
