= Eric Reed (musician) =

American jazz pianist and composer (born 1970)

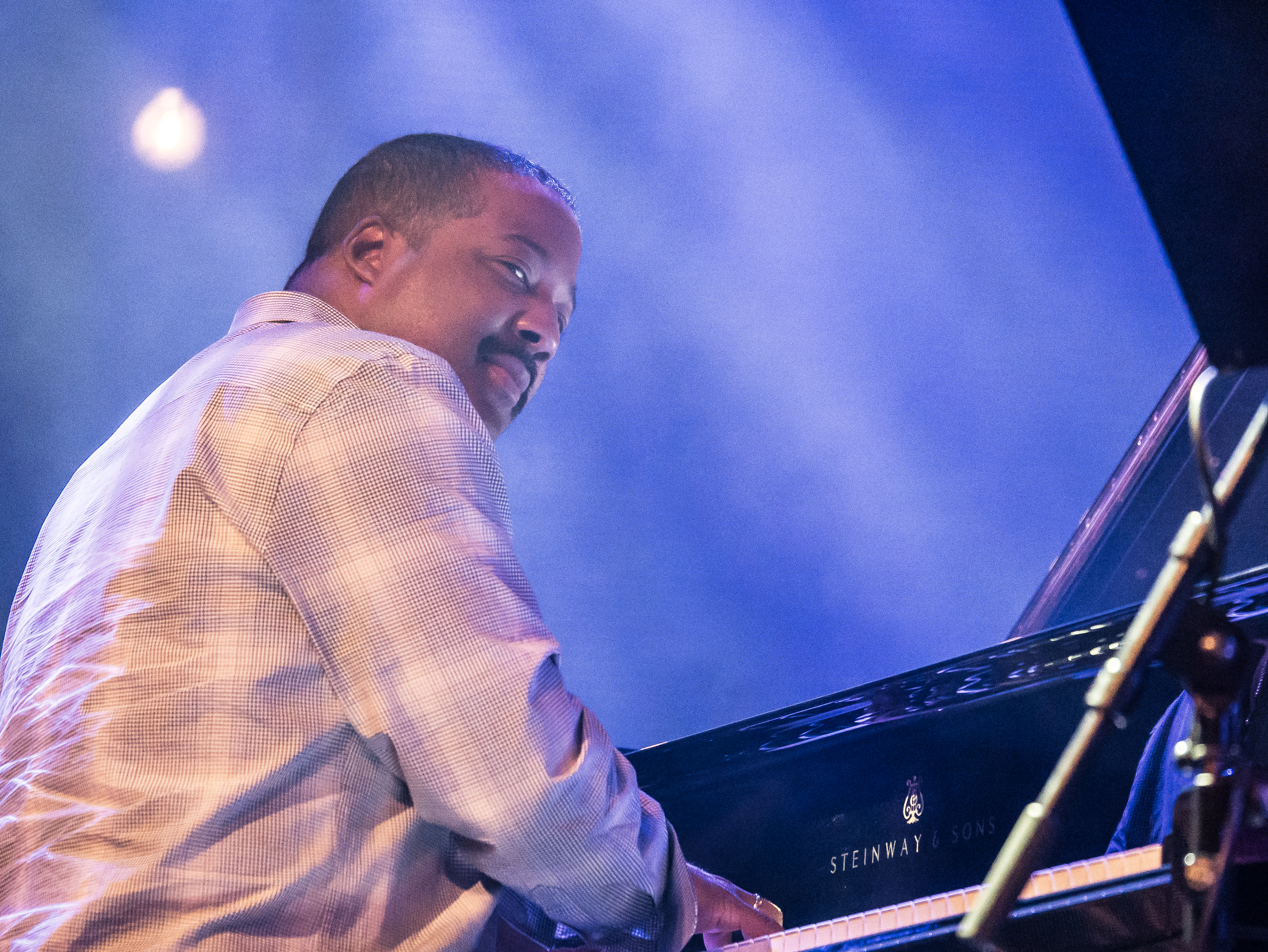
- Eric Reed at the Moers Festival 2015

Background information
- Born: Eric Scott Reed; June 21, 1970 (age 56); Philadelphia, Pennsylvania, U.S.
- Genres: Jazz
- Occupation: Musician
- Instrument: Piano
- Years active: 1990–present
- Labels: Candid, Impulse!, GRP, Nagel-Heyer, Savant, Maxjazz, W3J
- Formerly of: Black Note

Eric Scott Reed (born June 21, 1970) is an American jazz pianist and composer. His group Black Note released several albums in the 1990s.

== Biography ==
Reed was born in Philadelphia, Pennsylvania. He began playing piano at age two, was playing piano in his minister father's church by age five, and at age seven began formal study at Philadelphia's Settlement Music School. At age 11 his family moved to Los Angeles, and he studied at the R. D. Colburn School of Arts.

In May 1986, at Colburn School, Reed met Wynton Marsalis, an encounter that would greatly aid his career. At age 18, during a year of college at California State University, Northridge, Reed briefly toured with Marsalis. He joined Marsalis's septet a year later, and worked with him from 1990 to 1991 (in 1991–1992 he worked with Joe Henderson and Freddie Hubbard), and again from 1992 to 1995. He later worked with the Lincoln Center Jazz Orchestra for two years (1996–1998), and led his own group in 1999.

Reed has worked with Robert Stewart, Irvin Mayfield, Cassandra Wilson, Mary Stallings, Clark Terry, Dianne Reeves, Elvin Jones, Ron Carter, Paula West, and Benny Carter. In 2010 he joined the Christian McBride combo Inside Straight, which produced the album Kind of Brown.

Reed has also worked as a composer, scoring music for independent and mainstream films, including the comedy Life, featuring Eddie Murphy and Martin Lawrence.

Three of his albums have charted on the Billboard' Top Jazz Albums chart: 1995's The Swing and I (peak No. 22); 1998's Pure Imagination (peak No. 8); and 1999's Manhattan Melodies (peak No. 21).

== Discography ==
=== As leader/co-leader ===
- 1990: Soldier's Hymn (Candid, 1991)
- 1993: It's All Right to Swing (MoJazz, 1993)
- 1994: The Swing and I (MoJazz, 1995)
- 1995: West Coast Jazz Summit with Ralph Moore, Robert Hurst, Jeff Hamilton (Mons, 1996)
- 1996: Musicale with Nicholas Payton, Wycliffe Gordon, Wessell Anderson, Ron Carter (Impulse!/GRP, 1996)
- 1997: Pure Imagination (Impulse!/GRP, 1998)
- 1998: Manhattan Melodies (Impulse!/GRP, 1999)
- 2000: EBop (Savant, 2003)
- 2000: Happiness (Nagel-Heyer, 2001)
- 2001: Mercy and Grace (Nagel-Heyer, 2003)
- 2001: WE with Wycliffe Gordon (Nagel-Heyer, 2001)
- 2002: From My Heart (Savant, 2002)
- 2002: Cleopatra's Dream (M&I/Pony Canyon, 2003)
- 2003: Merry Magic (Maxjazz, 2003)
- 2003: Impressive & Romantic: The Great Composers We Love (M&I/Pony Canyon, 2004)
- 2004: Blue Trane (M&I/Pony Canyon, 2005)
- 2005: Here (Maxjazz, 2006)
- 2005: Blue Monk (M&I/Pony Canyon, 2006)
- 2006: WE 2 with Wycliffe Gordon (WJ3, 2007)
- 2008: Stand! (WJ3, 2009)
- 2009: Plenty Swing, Plenty Soul with Cyrus Chestnut (Savant, 2010)
- 2009: The Dancing Monk (Savant, 2011)
- 2009: Something Beautiful (WJ3, 2011)
- 2011: The Baddest Monk (Savant, 2012)
- 2012: Reflections of a Grateful Heart (WJ3, 2013)
- 2013: The Adventurous Monk (Savant, 2014)
- 2013: Groovewise (Smoke Sessions, 2014)
- 2017: A Light in Darkness (WJ3, 2017)
- 2018: Everybody Gets the Blues (Smoke Sessions, 2019)
- 2022: Black, Brown and Blue (Smoke Sessions, 2023)
- 2024: Out Late (Smoke Sessions, 2025)

=== As sideman ===
With Wynton Marsalis

- 1992: Citi Movement (Columbia, 1993)
- 1994: Joe Cool's Blues (Columbia, 1995)
- 1994: Standard Time, Vol. 4: Marsalis Plays Monk (Columbia, 1999)
- 1995: Blood on the Fields (Columbia, 1997)
- 1997: Standard Time, Vol. 5: The Midnight Blues (Columbia, 1998)
- 1999: Standard Time, Vol. 6: Mr. Jelly Lord (Columbia, 1999)
- Box set: Live at the Village Vanguard (Columbia, 1999)[7CD]

With others

- Robert Stewart, Judgement (World Stage, 1994; Red, 1997)
- Carl Allen, Randy Brecker, Javon Jackson, Steve Nelson, Terrell Stafford, Rodney Whitaker, Joanne Brackeen, Thank You, Joe!: Our Tribute To Joe Henderson (Arkadia Jazz, 2000)
- Christian McBride, Kind of Brown (Mack Avenue, 2009)
