= In This House, On This Morning =

Studio album by Wynton Marsalis
- Released: March 22, 1994
- Recorded: May 28–29, 1992; March 20–21, 1993
- Genre: Jazz
- Length: 1:54:52
- Label: Columbia

Wynton Marsalis chronology
Accent on the Offbeat (1994)	In This House, On This Morning (1994)	They Came to Swing (1994)

In This House, On This Morning is an album by the jazz trumpeter Wynton Marsalis, released in 1994 by Columbia Records. The album peaked at number seven on Billboard's Top Jazz Albums chart.

== Critical reception ==
Professional ratings
Review scores
Source	Rating
AllMusic	4/5 stars
The Encyclopedia of Popular Music	3/5 stars
The Penguin Guide to Jazz Recordings	3/4 stars

AllMusic's Scott Yanow wrote, "The set does take quite awhile to get going with much of the first two parts consisting of introductions and transitions to themes that never seem to arrive," but that "due to the memorable final section, this lengthy work is one of the high points of [Marsalis's] career thus far."

== Track listing ==
All tracks are written by Wynton Marsalis.

Disc one
No.	Title	Length
1.	"Devotional"	3:00
2.	"Call to Prayer"	5:58
3.	"Processional"	4:35
4.	"Representative Offerings"	6:46
5.	"The Lord’s Prayer"	3:48
6.	"Hymn"	3:47
7.	"Scripture"	4:11
8.	"Introduction to Prayer"	2:24
9.	"In This House"	3:10
10.	"Choral Response"	5:10
11.	"Local Announcements"	3:34
12.	"Altar Call"	1:30
13.	"Altar Call (Introspection)"	8:41
Total length:		57:03

Disc two
No.	Title	Length
1.	"In the Sweet Embrace of Life Sermon: Father"	16:02
2.	"In the Sweet Embrace of Life Sermon: Son"	4:58
3.	"In the Sweet Embrace of Life Sermon: Holy Ghost"	6:56
4.	"Invitation"	5:59
5.	"Recessional"	10:34
6.	"Benediction"	3:25
7.	"Uptempo Posthude"	7:44
8.	"Pot Blessed Dinner"	2:40
Total length:		58:22

== Personnel ==
- Wess “Warmdaddy” Anderson – alto sax, sopranino sax
- Eric Reed – piano
- Reginald Veal – bass
- Wycliffe Gordon – trombone
- Todd Williams – tenor sax, soprano sax
- Herlin Riley – drums, tambourine
- Marion Williams – vocals
