= Wessell Anderson =

American jazz saxophonist (b. 1966)

- Born: 1966 (age 59–60); Brooklyn, New York, U.S.
- Genre: Jazz
- Occupation: Musician
- Instrument: Saxophone
- Years active: 1980–present

Wessell "Warmdaddy" Anderson (born 1966) is an American jazz alto and sopranino saxophonist.

== Career ==
Anderson grew up in Bedford-Stuyvesant and Crown Heights, and played jazz early on at the urging of his father, who was a drummer. He played in local clubs from his early teenage years, and studied at the Jazzmobile workshops with Frank Wess, Charles Davis, and Frank Foster. He also met Branford Marsalis, who convinced him to study with Alvin Batiste at Southern University in Louisiana.

Soon after this, Anderson began touring with the Wynton Marsalis Septet, and collaborated with Marsalis through the middle of the 1990s. He continued to play with Marsalis's Lincoln Center Jazz Orchestra beyond this. In 1994, he released his debut album on Atlantic Records; pianist Eric Reed and bassist Ben Wolfe were among those who played as sidemen. His 1998 album Live at the Village Vanguard featured trumpeter Irvin Mayfield, bassist Steve Kirby, pianist Xavier Davis and drummer Jaz Sawyer.

== Discography ==
- Warmdaddy in the Garden of Swing (Atlantic, 1994)
- The Ways of Warmdaddy (Atlantic, 1996)
- Live at the Village Vanguard (Leaning House, 1998)
- Space (Self-released, 2006)
- Warm It Up, Warmdaddy! (Nu Jazz, 2009) - Reissue of Space

=== As sideman ===
With Wynton Marsalis

- Big Train (Columbia/Sony Classical, 1999)
- ’’Live at the House of Tribes’’ (Blue Note, 2005)
