= 2001 in jazz =

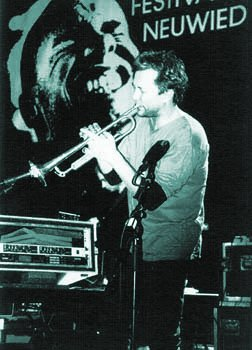
- Nils Petter Molvær in Neuwied, Germany 2001.
- Decade: 2000s in jazz
- Music: 2001 in music
- Standards: List of jazz standards
- See also: 2000 in jazz – 2002 in jazz

This is a timeline documenting events of Jazz in the year 2001.

== Events ==
=== January ===
- 25 – The 4th Polarjazz started in Longyearbyen, Svalbard (January 25 – 28).

=== April ===
- 6
  - The 28th Vossajazz started at Vossavangen, Norway (April 6 – 8).
  - Stein Inge Brækhus was awarded Vossajazzprisen 2003.
- 3 – Eldbjørg Raknes performs the commissioned work So much depends upon a red wheel barrow for Vossajazz 2003.

=== May ===
- 23 – The 29th Nattjazz 2001 started in Bergen, Norway (May 23 – June 2).

=== June ===
- 1 – The 30th Moers Festival started in Moers, Germany (June 1 – 4).
- 19 – The 13th Jazz Fest Wien started in Vienna, Austria (June 19 – July 8).
- 26 – The 18th Stockholm Jazz Festival started in Stockholm, Sweden (June 26 – July 22).
- 29 – The 22nd Montreal International Jazz Festival started in Montreal, Quebec, Canada (June 29 - July 10).

=== July ===
- 6 – The 35th Montreux Jazz Festival started in Montreux, Switzerland (July 6 – 22).
- 13 – The 26th North Sea Jazz Festival started in The Hague, Netherlands (July 13 – 15).
- 14 – The 36th Pori Jazz Festival started in Pori, Finland (July 14 – 22).
- 16 – The 41st Moldejazz started in Molde, Norway (July 16 – 21).
- 21 – The 54th Nice Jazz Festival started in Nice, France (July 21 – 28).
- 24 – The 36th San Sebastian Jazz Festival started in San Sebastian, Spain (July 24 – 29).

=== August ===
- 6 – The 16th Oslo Jazzfestival started in Oslo, Norway (August 6–12).
- 8 – The 15th Sildajazz started in Haugesund, Norway (August 8 – 12).
- 10
  - The 47th Newport Jazz Festival started in Newport, Rhode Island (August 10 – 12).
  - The 19th Brecon Jazz Festival started in Brecon, Wales (August 10 – 12).

=== September ===
- 21 – The 44th Monterey Jazz Festival started in Monterey, California (September 21 – 23).

=== October ===
- 11 – The DølaJazz started in Lillehammer, Norway (Oktober 11 - 14).

=== November ===
- 8 – The Trondheim Jazz Festival started in Trondheim, Norway (November 8 – 11).
- 9 – The 10th London Jazz Festival started in London, England (November 9 – 18).

== Albums released ==
=== April ===
| Day | Album | Artist | Label | Notes | Ref. |
|---|---|---|---|---|---|
| 17 | Nocturne | Charlie Haden | Verve Records | Executive producer Daniel Richard | |

=== Unknown date ===
#

B

- Michael Brecker: Nearness Of You: The Ballad Book (Verve)

C

- Marilyn Crispell: Blue (Black Saint)

G

- Gordon Goodwin's Big Phat Band: Swingin' For The Fences (Silverline)

H

- Herbie Hancock: Future 2 Future (Transparent, Columbia)
- Gordon Haskell: Look Out (Flying Sparks)

K

- Olga Konkova Trio: Some Things From Home (Candid)
- Diana Krall: The Look of Love (Verve)

M

- James Morrison: Scream Machine (Morrison Records)

S

- Matthew Shipp: Expansion Power Release (hatOLOGY)

T

- The Idea of North: The Sum of Us (Magnetic Records)

W

- Robbie Williams: Swing When You're Winning (Capitol ) More Easy Listening Style
- World Saxophone Quartet: 25th Anniversary: The New Chapter (Justin Time)

== Deaths ==
January

- 4 – Les Brown, American bandleader (born 1912).
- 13 – Stan Freeman, American composer, lyricist, musical arranger, conductor, and pianist (born 1920).
- 17 – Norris Turney, American flautist and saxophonist (born 1921).
- 23
  - Jack McDuff, American organist and organ trio bandleader (born 1926).
  - Lou Levy, American pianist (born 1928).

February

- 4 – J. J. Johnson, American trombonist, composer, and arranger (born 1924).
- 10 – Buddy Tate, American saxophonist and clarinetist (born 1913).
- 13
  - George T. Simon, American writer and drummer (born 1912).
  - Moses Taiwa Molelekwa, South African pianist (born 1973).

March

- 7 – Frankie Carle, American pianist and bandleader (born 1903).
- 18 – Rupert Nurse, Trinidadian-British pianist, upright bassist, and saxophonist (born 1910).
- 19 – Herbie Jones, American trumpeter and arranger (born 1926).
- 20 – Jay Cameron, American baritone saxophonist and reedist (born 1928).
- 28 – Moe Koffman, Canadian saxophonist, flautist, composer, and arranger (born 1928).
- 29 – John Lewis, American pianist, composer and arranger (born 1920).

April

- 5 – Sonya Hedenbratt, Swedish singer and actress (born 1931).
- 9 – Ken Rattenbury, English trumpeter, pianist, composer, and author (born 1920).
- 18 – Billy Mitchell, American tenor saxophonist (born 1926).
- 24 – Al Hibbler, American baritone singer, Duke Ellington Orchestra (born 1915).

May

- 3 – Billy Higgins, American drummer (born 1936).
- 19 – Susannah McCorkle, American singer (born 1946).
- 22 – Lorez Alexandria, American singer (born 1929).
- 27 – Glauco Masetti, Italian jazz reedist (born 1922).

June

- 13 – Makanda Ken McIntyre, American musician and composer (born 1931).
- 19 – Lindsay L. Cooper, Scottish upright bass, electric bass and cello player (born 1940).
- 30
  - Chet Atkins, American guitarist, songwriter, and record producer (born 1924).
  - Joe Henderson, American tenor saxophonist (born 1937).

July

- 27 – Harold Land, American hard bop and post-bop tenor saxophonist (born 1928).

August

- 6 – Larry Adler, American harmonica player (born 1914).
- 17 – Flip Phillips, American tenor saxophonist and clarinetist (born 1915).
- 23 – Eric Allandale, Dominican-English trombonist, songwriter, and bandleader (born 1936).
- 27 – Cal Collins, American guitarist (born 1933).

September

- 1 – Sil Austin, American saxophonist (born 1929).
- 2 – Jay Migliori, American saxophonist (born 1930).

October

- 2 – Manny Albam, American baritone saxophonist, composer, arranger, producer, and educator (born 1922).
- 4 – John Collins, American guitarist (born 1913).
- 11 – Billy Maxted, American pianist (born 1917).
- 16 – Etta Jones, American singer (born 1928).
- 29 – Spike Robinson, American tenor saxophonist (born 1930).
- 31 – Bill Le Sage, British pianist, vibraphonist, arranger, composer, and bandleader (born 1927).

November

- 13
  - Babik Reinhardt, French jazz guitarist (born 1944).
  - Panama Francis, American drummer (born 1918).
- 16 – Tommy Flanagan, American jazz pianist and composer (born 1930).
- 21 – Ralph Burns, American pianist, composer, and arranger (born 1922).

December

- 14 – Conte Candoli, American trumpeter (born 1927).
- 22 – Gene Taylor, American upright bassist (born 1929).
- 30 – Ralph Sutton, American pianist (born 1922).

Unknown date

- David Batey, English pianist (born 1939)
- Oliver Todd, American band leader, organist, pianist, and trumpeter (born 1916).

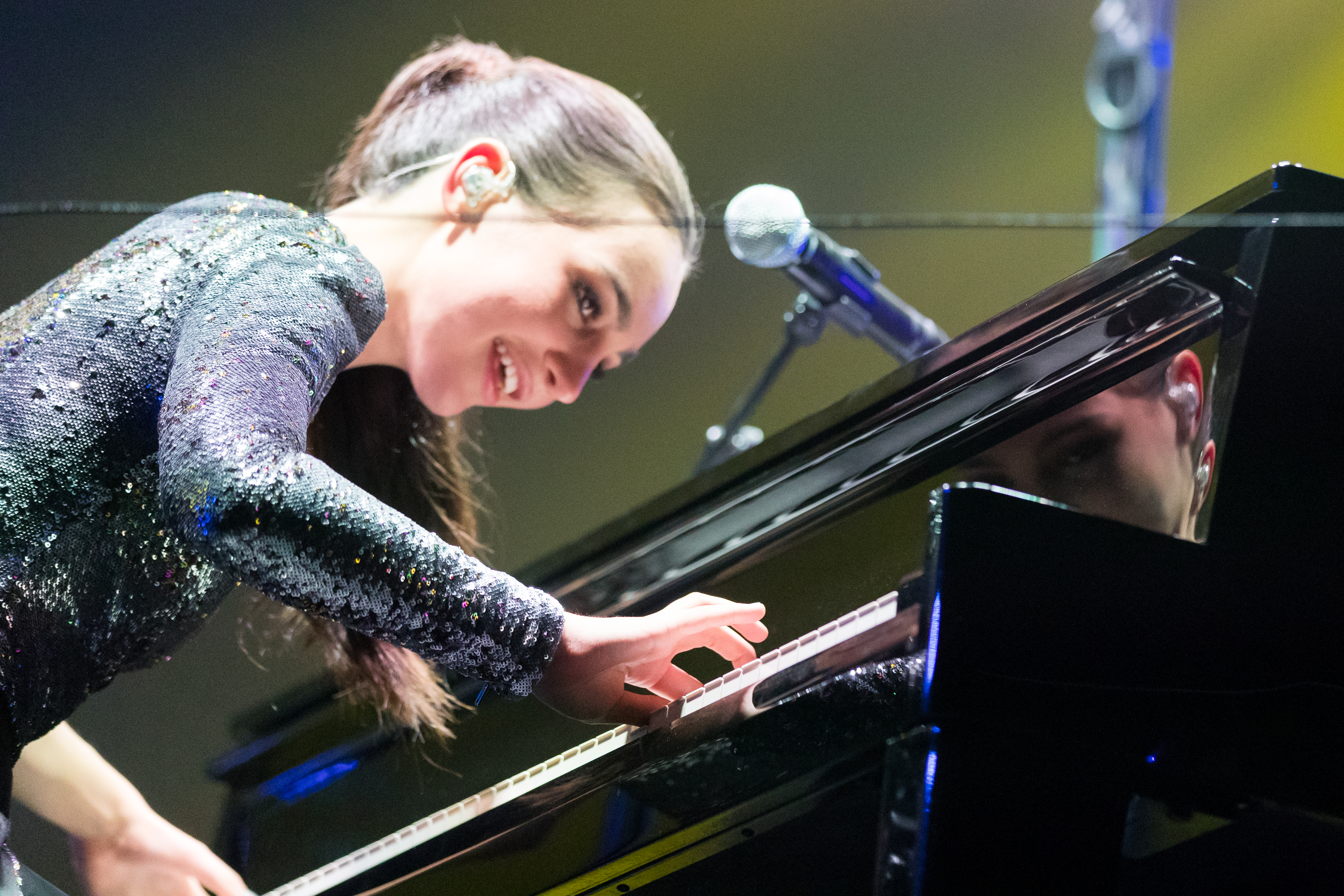
Emily Bear at the 2017 Night of the Proms in Mannheim, Germany.

== Births ==
August

- 30 – Emily Bear, American composer and pianist.

== See also ==
- 2000s in jazz
- List of years in jazz
- 2001 in music
