= 1926 in jazz =

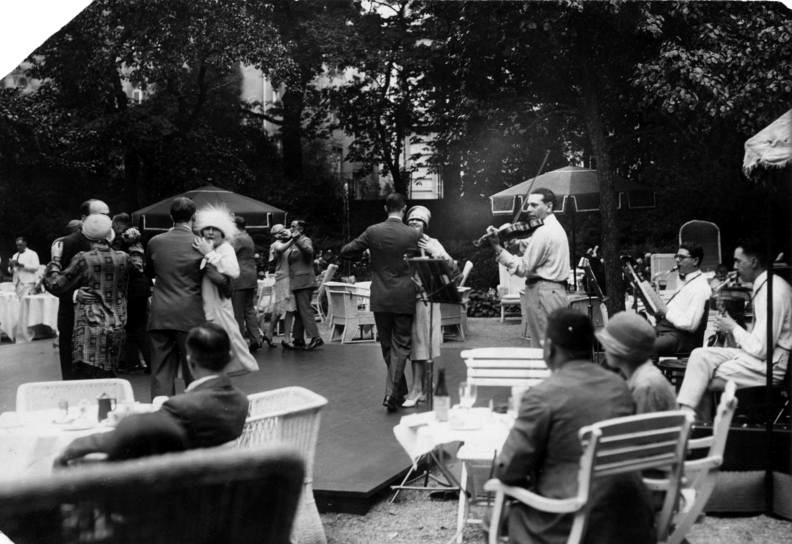
- A jazz ensemble playing in Berlin in the summer of 1926
- Decade: 1920s in jazz
- Music: 1926 in music
- Standards: List of 1920s jazz standards
- See also: 1925 in jazz – 1927 in jazz

This is a timeline documenting events of Jazz in the year 1926.

Musicians born that year included Miles Davis and John Coltrane.

== Events ==
- American author and dramatist Edna Ferber publishes the novel Show Boat, popularizing life in the Southern United States. Although Ferber never visited the south and invented her story from fictional minstrel themes, the real American Show Boats were steeped in the black Riverboat Jazz music of Mississippi and the Ohio Valley.
- American ragtime jazz pianist, bandleader and composer Jelly Roll Morton is signed by Victor and begins recording with the Red Hot Peppers, featuring Kid Ory, Omer Simeon, George Mitchell, Johnny St. Cyr, Barney Bigard, Johnny Dodds, and Baby Dodds.
- Duke Ellington and his band record "East St Louis Toodle-o" on November 29.
- The Jean Goldkette band with Bix Beiderbecke and Frankie Trumbauer start playing the Roseland Ballroom in Manhattan in early October.

== Record releases ==
- Louis Armstrong's Hot Five releases recordings on Okeh: including Heebie Jeebies.
- Jelly Roll Morton's Red Hot Peppers recordings on Victor:"Sidewalk Blues."

=== Standards ===
- In 1926 standards published included "Big Butter and Egg Man", "Bye Bye Blackbird" and "'Deed I Do".

=== Music criticism ===
- August: David Stanley Smith (1877–1949) Professor of Music at Yale University, dismisses Jazz as a serious art form in The Musician.
- November: Andrè Coeuroy (1895–1980) and Andrè Schaeffner publish Le Jazz.
- Jacques Émile Blanche (1861–1942) criticizes Jazz music and dance in La Revue nouvelle as a foreign import that threatens the nationality of France.

== Deaths ==
Unknown date

- Edmund Jenkins, African-American composer during the Harlem Renaissance (born 1894).

== Births ==
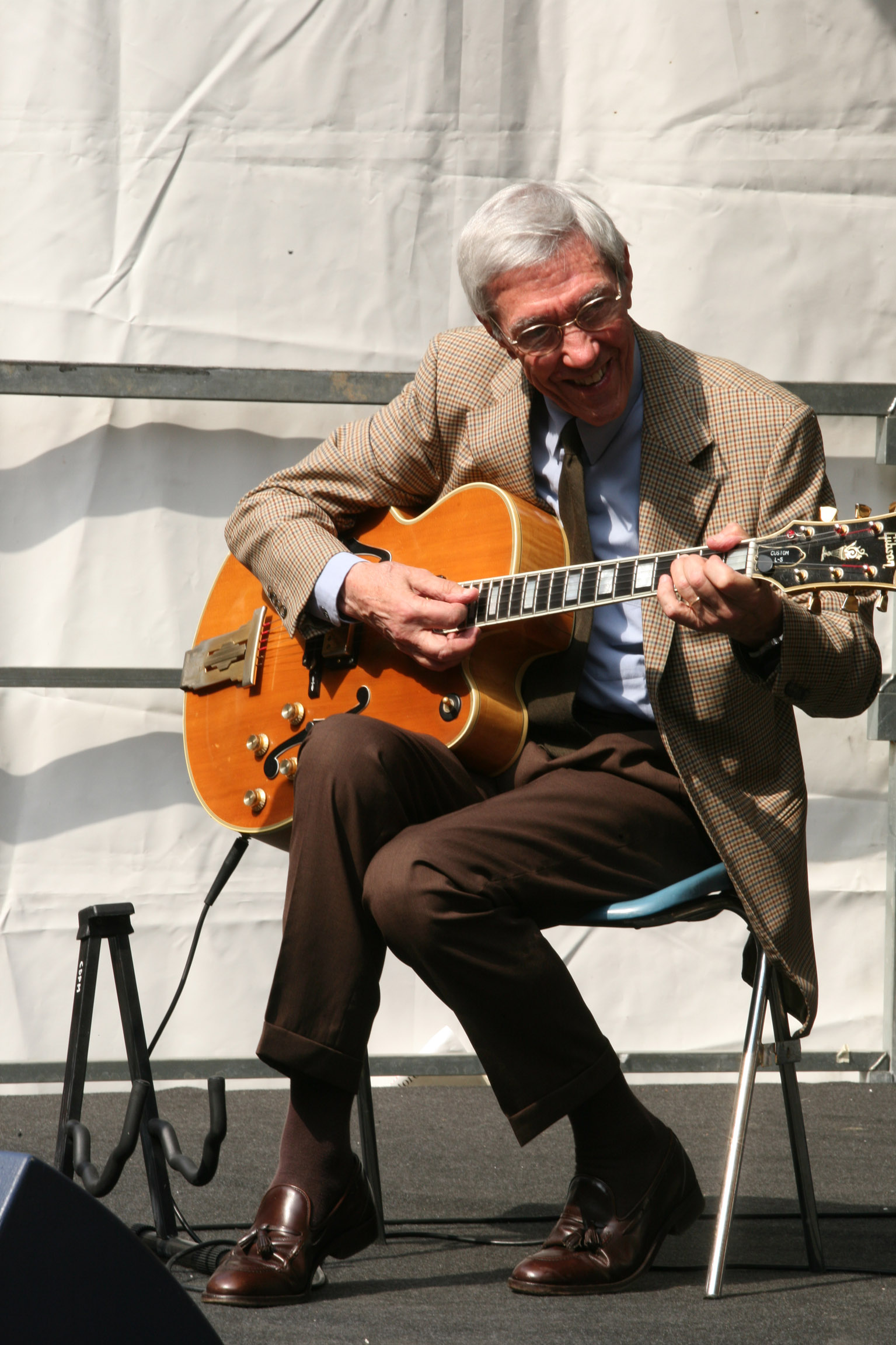
Jazz guitarist Franco Cerri in Milan, Italy in September 2008

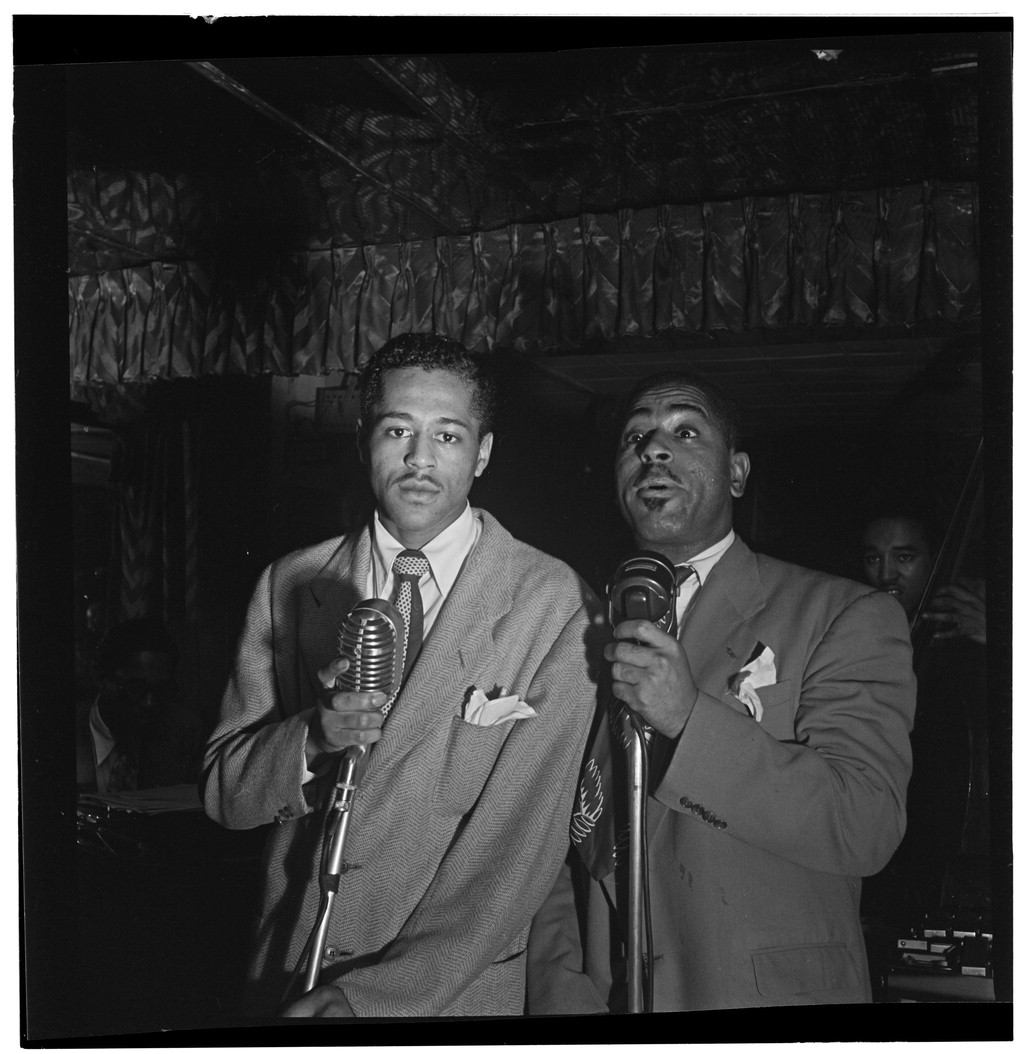
Kenny Hagood with Dizzy Gillespie.

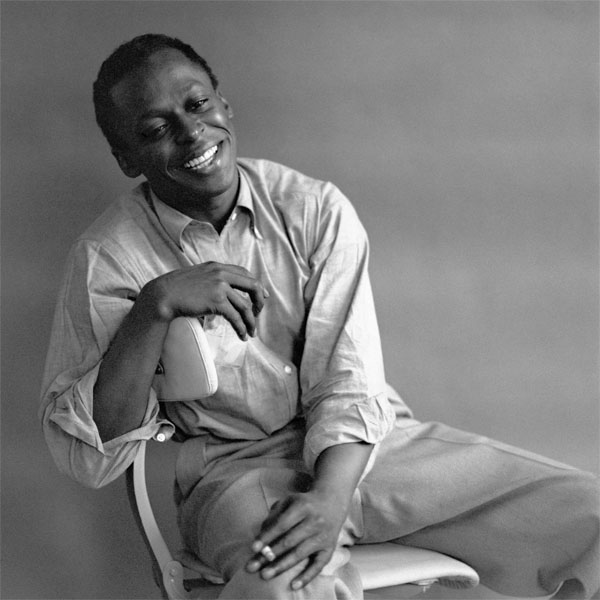
Jazz musician Miles Davis

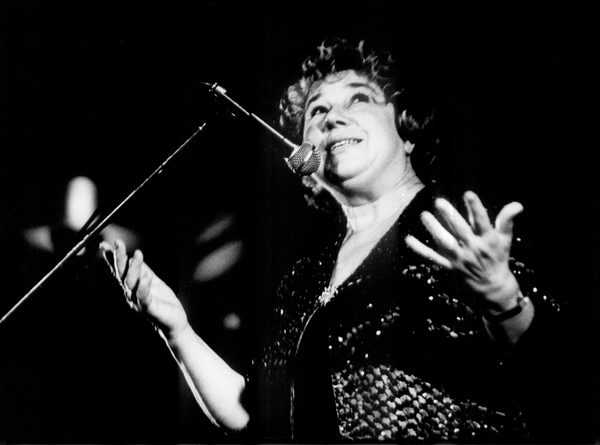
Czech jazz singer Vlasta Pruchova, Lucerna Hall, Prague 1985

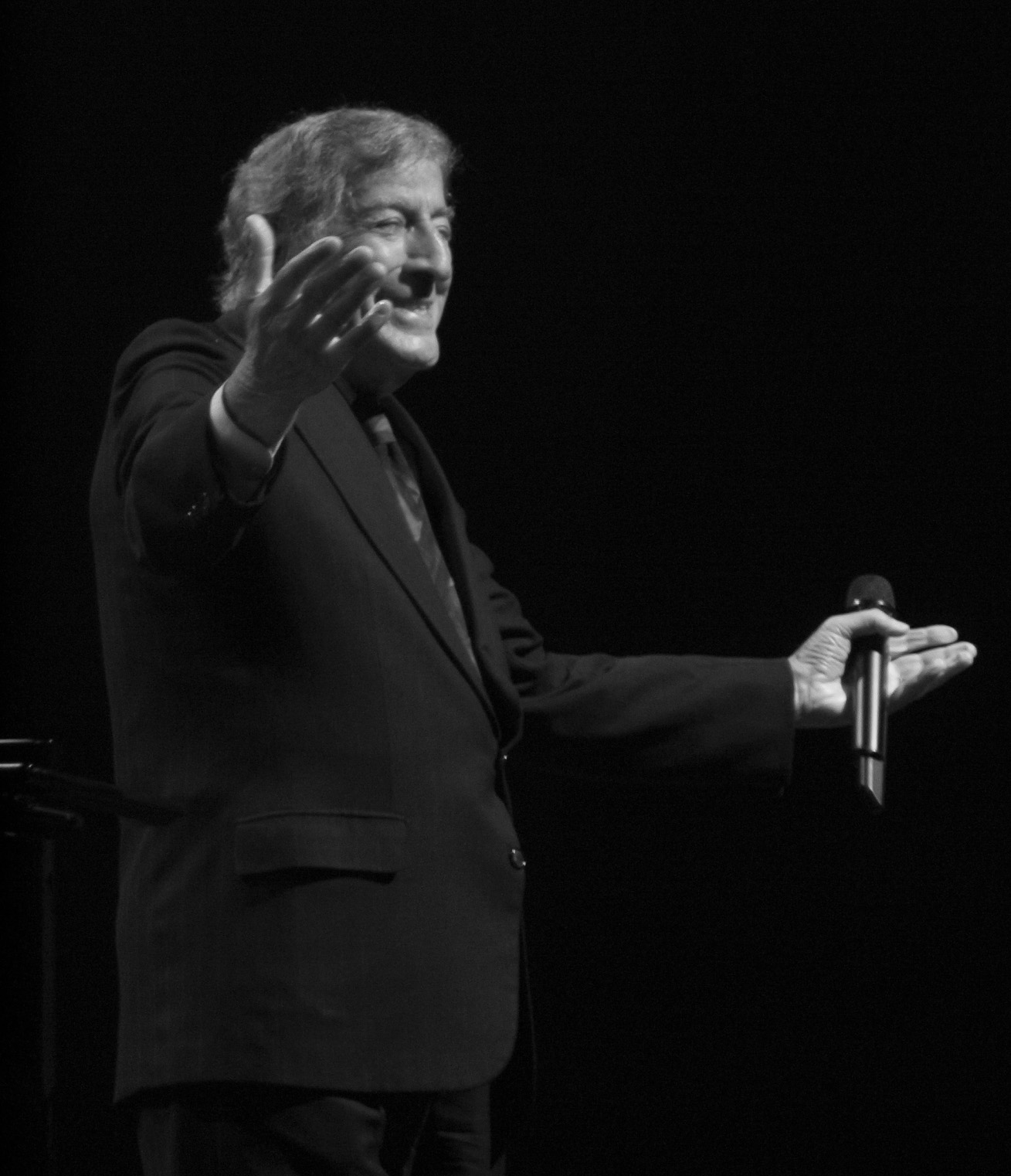
Tony Bennett in 2012.

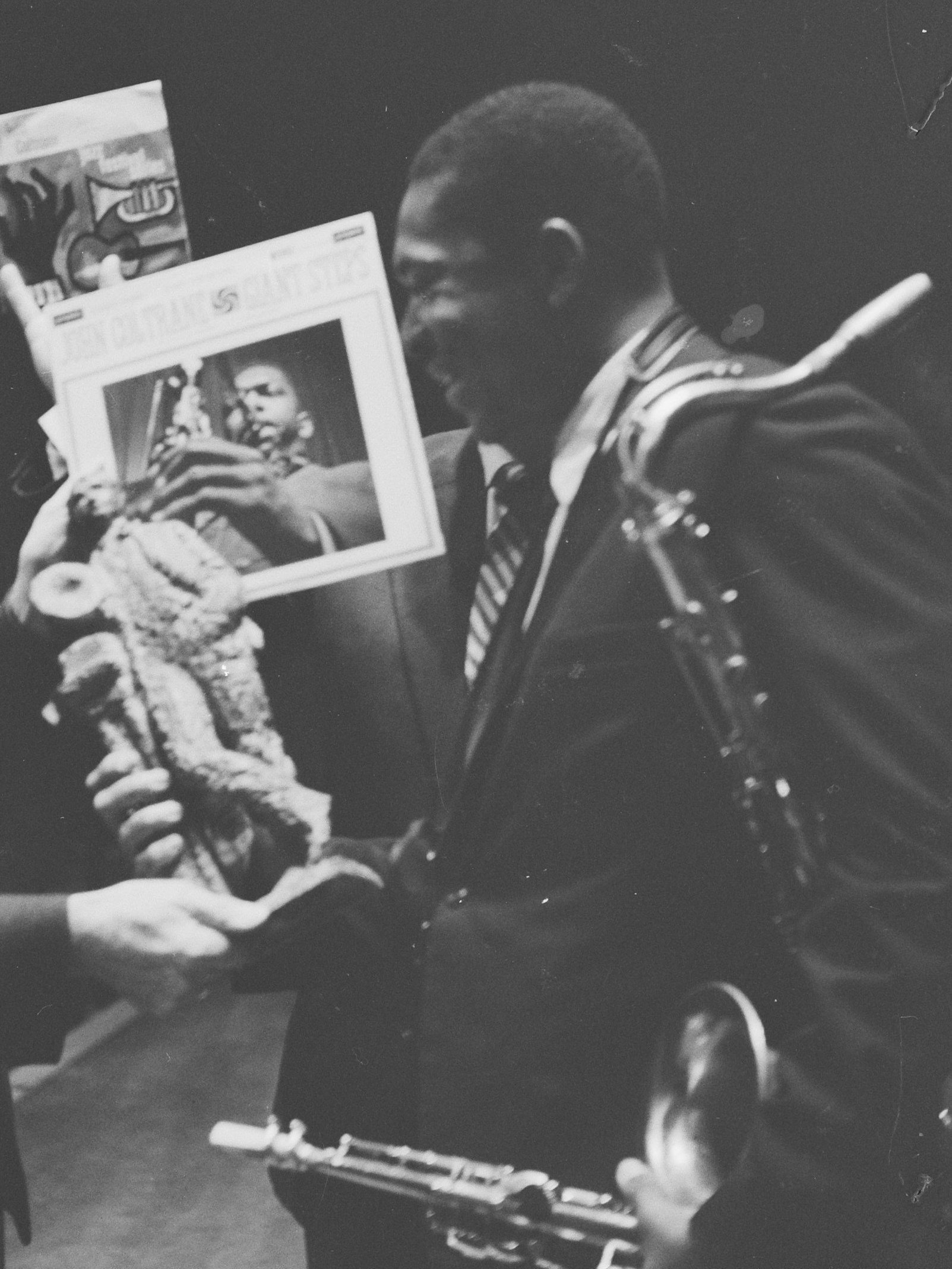
John Coltrane in 1961.

January

- 5 – Jack Brokensha, Australian-born American vibraphonist (died 2010).
- 8 – Renato Sellani, Italian pianist and composer (died 2014).
- 9
  - Bucky Pizzarelli, American guitarist and banjo player (died 2020).
  - Randi Hultin, Norwegian jazz critic and impresario (died 2000).
  - Roger Guérin, French trumpeter and singer (died 2010).
- 10 – Willie Dennis, American trombonist (died 1965).
- 13 – Melba Liston, American trombonist (died 1999).
- 16 – Stan Reynolds, British trumpeter, guitarist and bandleader (died 2018).
- 23 – Curtis Counce, American upright bassist (died 1963).
- 29 – Franco Cerri, Italian guitarist and upright bassist (died 2021).

February

- 2 – Mimi Perrin, French pianist and singer (died 2010).
- 6 – Bernie Glow, American trumpet player (died 1982).
- 8 – Pony Poindexter, American saxophonist (died 1988).
- 12 – Buddy Childers, American trumpet player (died 2007).
- 17 – Will Davis, American pianist (died 1984).
- 20 – Bobby Jaspar, Belgian saxophonist and flautist (died 1963).
- 21 – Ronnie Verrell, English drummer (died 2002).
- 22 – Dave Bailey, American drummer (died 2023).
- 26 – Chris Anderson, American pianist (died 2008).

March

- 4 – Don Rendell, English saxophonist (died 2015).
- 19 – Bill Henderson, American singer and actor (died 2016).
- 22 – Avo Uvezian, Armenian-American pianist, composer, and cigar manufacturer (died 2017).
- 23 – Herbie Jones, American trumpeter (died 2001).
- 25 – Riz Ortolani, Italian film composer (died 2014).
- 26 – Sonny Bradshaw, Jamaican trumpeter (died 2009).

April

- 2 – Kenny Hagood, American vocalist (died 1989).
- 5 – Stan Levey, American drummer (died 2005).
- 6 – Randy Weston, American pianist and composer (died 2018).
- 17 – Whitney Balliett, American journalist and jazz critic (died 2007).
- 20 – Cy Laurie, English clarinettist and bandleader (died 2002).
- 30 – Buddy Arnold, American saxophonist (died 2003).

May

- 3
  - Jimmy Cleveland, American trombonist (died 2008).
  - Jymie Merritt, American upright bassist (died 2020).
- 4 – Sonny Payne, American drummer (died 1979).
- 7 – Herbie Steward, American saxophonist (died 2003).
- 15 – Bonnie Wetzel, American upright bassist (died 1965).
- 18 – Lou Bennett, American organist (died 1997).
- 22 – Elek Bacsik, Hungarian-American guitarist and violinist (died 1993).
- 24 – Stan Barker, English pianist (died 1997).
- 25 – Milt Bernhart, American trombonist (died 2004).
- 26 – Miles Davis, American trumpeter (died 1991).
- 27 – Bud Shank, American saxophonist and flautist (died 2009).
- 28 – Russ Freeman, American pianist and composer (died 2002).
- 30 – Tony Terran, American trumpet player (died 2017).

June

- 6 – Kristian Bergheim, Norwegian saxophonist (died 2010).
- 9
  - CeDell Davis, American guitarist and singer (died 2017).
  - Jimmy Gourley, American guitarist (died 2008).
- 10 – Joe Negri, American guitarist and educator.
- 11 – Jim Caine, British pianist and radio presenter (died 2018).
- 16 – Clarence Shaw, American trumpet player (died 1973).
- 29 – Ove Lind, Swedish clarinetist (died 1991).

July

- 2 – Billy Usselton, American reed player (died 1994).
- 3
  - Johnny Coles, American trumpeter (died 1997).
  - Walt Harper, American pianist (died 2006).
- 6 – Frank Rehak, American trombonist (died 1987).
- 12
  - Vlasta Průchová, Czech singer (died 2006).
  - Joe Houston, American saxophonist (died 2015).
- 13 – Bengt-Arne Wallin, Swedish composer, arrangeur, trumpeter, and flugelhornist (died 2015).
- 17 – Ray Copeland, American trumpeter (died 1984).
- 28 – Charlie Biddle, Canadian upright bassist (died 2003).

August

- 3 – Tony Bennett, Italian-American singer (died 2023).
- 5 – Jeri Southern, American pianist and singer (died 1991).
- 8 – Urbie Green, American trombonist (died 2018).
- 12 – Dave Lee, English pianist, orchestra leader, arranger, songwriter, and film composer.
- 14 – Buddy Greco, American singer and pianist (died 2017).
- 17 – George Melly, English singer (died 2007).
- 20 – Frank Rosolino, American trombonist (died 1978).
- 22 – Bob Flanigan, American vocalist (died 2011).
- 28
  - Hal Russell, American saxophonist and mult-instrumentalist (died 1992).
  - Phil Seamen, English drummer (died 1972).

September

- 3 – Ernie Henry, American saxophonist (died 1957).
- 17 – Jack McDuff, American organist (died 2001).
- 19 – Nini Rosso, Italian jazz trumpeter and composer (died 1994).
- 20 – Jackie Paris, American singer and guitarist (died 2004).
- 22 – Bill Smith, American clarinetist and composer (died 2020).
- 23
  - Jimmy Woode, American bassist (died 2005).
  - John Coltrane, American saxophonist (died 1967).
- 26 – Julie London, American singer (died 2000).

October

- 10 – Oscar Brown, American singer (died 2005).
- 12 – Hidehiko Matsumoto, Japanese saxophonist and bandleader (died 2000).
- 13
  - Ray Brown, American upright bassist (died 2002).
  - Tommy Whittle, British saxophonist (died 2013).
- 18 – Chuck Berry, American guitarist, singer and songwriter (died 2017).
- 21 – Don Elliott, American trumpeter and vibraphonist (died 1984).
- 25 – Jimmy Heath, American saxophonist called "Little Bird" (died 2020).

November

- 1 – Lou Donaldson, American alto saxophonist (died 2024).
- 3 – Billy Mitchell, American saxophonist (died 2001).
- 4 – Carlos Valdes, Cuban-born conga player (died 2007).
- 5 – Johnny Windhurst, American trumpeter (died 1981).
- 17 – George Masso, American trombonist and vibraphonist (died 2019).
- 18 – Claude Williamson, American pianist (died 2016).
- 19 – Nobuo Hara, Japanese saxophonist and bandleader (died 2021).

December

- 2 – Rob Swope, American trombonist (died 1967).
- 25
  - Hitoshi Ueki, Japanese singer and guitarist (died 2007).
  - Rick Fay, American clarinetist and saxophonist (died 1999).
- 26 – Monty Budwig, American upright bassist (died 1992).
- 28 – Donna Hightower, American singer and guitarist (died 2013).
- 30 – Stan Tracey, British pianist and composer (died 2013).

Unknown date

- Jimmy "Jammin'" Smith, American trumpeter (died 1953).

== See also ==
- 1920s in jazz
- Jazz Age
- Roaring Twenties
