= 2005 in jazz =

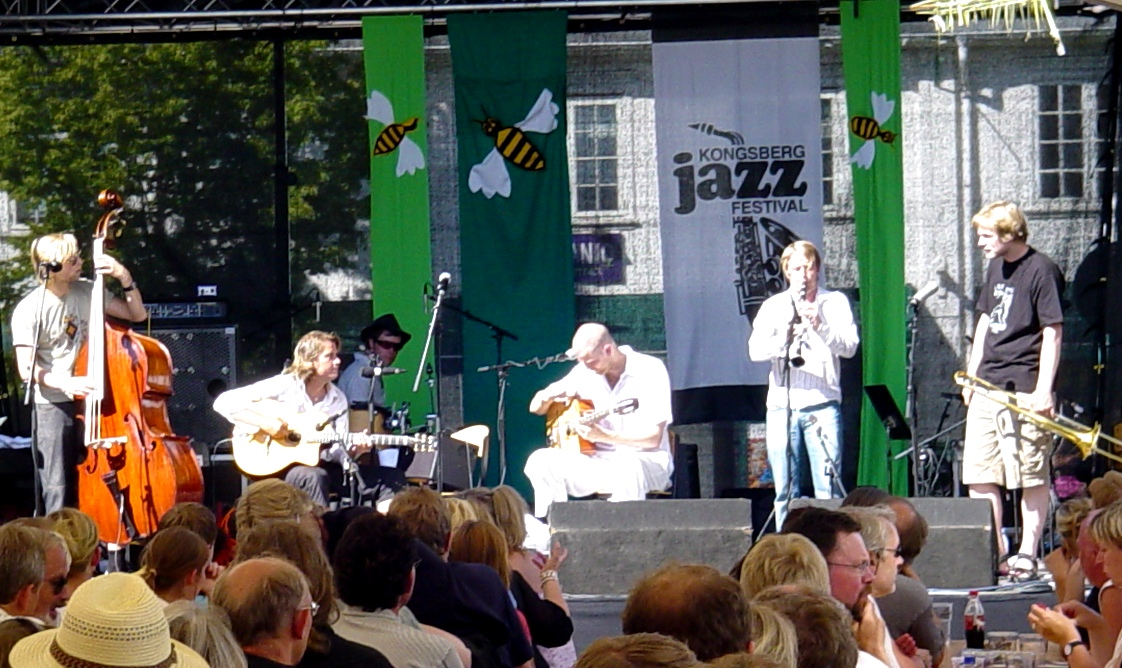
- Christianssand String Swing Ensemble at Kongsberg Jazzfestival 2005.
- Decade: 2000s in jazz
- Music: 2005 in music
- Standards: List of jazz standards
- See also: 2004 in jazz – 2006 in jazz

This is a timeline documenting events of Jazz in the year 2005.

== Events ==
=== January ===
- 27 – The 8th Polarjazz Festival started in Longyearbyen, Svalbard (January 27 – 29).

=== February ===
- 13 – The 47th Annual Grammy Awards
  - Ray Charles & Norah Jones in the categories Record of the Year and Best Pop Collaboration with Vocals for the song "Here We Go Again"
  - Ray Charles & Various Artists in the category Album of the Year and Best Pop Vocal Album for Genius Loves Company
  - The Maria Schneider Orchestra in the category Best Large Jazz Ensemble Album for Concert in the Garden
  - Bill Frisell in the category Best Contemporary Jazz Album for Unspeakable
  - Herbie Hancock in the category Best Jazz Instrumental Solo for the album Speak Like a Child
  - McCoy Tyner with Gary Bartz, Terence Blanchard, Christian McBride and Lewis Nash in the category Best Jazz Instrumental Album, Individual or Group for Illuminations
  - Nancy Wilson in the category Best Jazz Vocal Album for R.S.V.P. (Rare Songs, Very Personal)
  - Charlie Haden in the category Best Latin Jazz Album for Land of the Sun

=== March ===
- 3 – The very first Jakarta International Java Jazz Festival started in Jakarta, Indonesia (January 3 – 5).
- 18
  - The 32nd Vossajazz started at Vossavangen, Norway (March 18 – 20).
  - Berit Opheim was awarded Vossajazzprisen 2005.
- 19 – Jan Gunnar Hoff performs the commissioned work Free flow songs for Vossajazz 2005.

=== May ===
- 13 – The 34th Moers Festival started in Moers, Germany (May 13 – 16).
- 25 – The 33rd Nattjazz 2005 started in Bergen, Norway (May 25 – June 4).

=== June ===
- 23 – The very first Punktfestivalen started in Kristiansand, Norway (June 23–25).
- 28 – The 17th Jazz Fest Wien started in Vienna, Austria (June 28 – July 29).
- 30 – The 26th Montreal International Jazz Festival started in Montreal, Quebec, Canada (June 30 - July 10).

=== July ===
- 1
  - The 27th Copenhagen Jazz Festival started in Copenhagen, Denmark (July 1 – 10).
  - The 39th Montreux Jazz Festival started in Montreux, Switzerland (July 1 – 16).
- 6 – The 41st Kongsberg Jazzfestival started in Kongsberg, Norway (July 6 – 8).
- 8 – The 30th North Sea Jazz Festival started in The Hague, Netherlands (July 8 – 10).
- 16 – The 40th Pori Jazz Festival started in Pori, Finland (July 16 – 24).
- 18 – The 45th Moldejazz started in Molde, Norway with Arild Andersen as artist in residence (July 18 – 23).
- 19 – The 22nd Stockholm Jazz Festival started in Stockholm, Sweden (July 19 – 23).
- 20 – The 58th Nice Jazz Festival started in Nice, France (July 20 – 27).
- 22 – The 40th San Sebastian Jazz Festival started in San Sebastian, Spain (July 22 – 27).

=== August ===
- 10 – The 19th Sildajazz started in Haugesund, Norway (August 10 – 14).
- 12
  - The 51st Newport Jazz Festival started in Newport, Rhode Island (August 12 – 14).
  - The 22nd Brecon Jazz Festival started in Brecon, Wales (August 12 – 14).
- 15 – The 20th Oslo Jazzfestival started in Oslo, Norway (August 15 – 21).
- 23 – Hurricane Katrina destroys the "Cradle of Jazz", New Orleans (August 23–31).

=== September ===
- 16 – The 48th Monterey Jazz Festival started in Monterey, California (September 16 – 18).

=== November ===
- 11 – The 14th London Jazz Festival started in London, England (November 11 – 20).

== Album released ==
=== January ===
Day	Album	Artist	Label	Notes	Ref.
25	The Way Up	Pat Metheny	Nonesuch Records	Produced by Pat Metheny	

=== October ===
Day	Album	Artist	Label	Notes	Ref.
17	Floating	Ketil Bjørnstad	EmArcy Records	Produced by Ketil Bjørnstad	
31	In a Trance	Lionel Loueke	Space Time Records	Produced by Lionel Loueke	

== Deaths ==
January

- 4 — Humphrey Carpenter, English biographer, writer, and radio broadcaster (born 1946).

February

- 8 — Jimmy Smith, American jazz organist (born 1928).
- 15 – Bill Potts, American pianist and arranger (born 1928).
- 20 – Pam Bricker, American singer and professor of music (born 1954).

March

- 8 — Larry Bunker, American drummer (born 1928).

April

- 7 — José Melis, Cuban-American bandleader and television personality (born 1920).
- 14
  - Andrew Bisset, Australian author, music educator, and singer (born 1953).
  - Benny Bailey, American bebop and hard-bop trumpeter (born 1925).
- 19
  - Niels-Henning Ørsted Pedersen, Danish jazz bassist (heart attack) (born 1946).
  - Stan Levey, American drummer (born 1926).
- 22 – Arnie Lawrence, American saxophonist (born 1938).
- 23 – Jimmy Woode, American upright bassist (born 1926).
- 28 – Percy Heath, American upright bassist (born 1923).
- 29 – Dianne Brooks, American singer (born 1939).

May

- 12 – Monica Zetterlund, Swedish singer and actress (born 1937).
- 13 – Victor Sproles, American bassist (born 1927).
- 29 – Oscar Brown, American singer, songwriter, playwright, poet, civil rights activist, and actor (born 1926).

June

- 15 – Per Henrik Wallin, Swedish pianist and composer (born 1946).
- 16 – Billy Bauer, American cool jazz guitarist (born 1915).
- 18
  - Chris Griffin, American trumpeter (born 1915)
  - Basil Kirchin, English drummer and composer (born 1927).
- 29 – Mikkel Flagstad, Norwegian saxophonist (born 1930).

July

- 2 — Tom Talbert, American jazz pianist, composer, and band leader (born 1924).
- 4 — John Stubblefield, American saxophonist, flautist, and oboist (born 1945).
- 16 – Blue Barron, American orchestra leader (born 1913).
- 23 – Ted Greene, American fingerstyle jazz guitarist, columnist, and session musician (born 1946).
- 25 – Albert Mangelsdorff, German trombonists and composer (born 1928).
- 27 – Dom Um Romão, Brazilian drummer and percussionist (born 1935).
- 29 – Al McKibbon, American jazz double bassist (born 1919).
- 30 – Lucky Thompson, American jazz tenor and soprano saxophonist (born 1924).

August

- 6 — Keter Betts, American upright bassist (born 1928).
- 12
  - Charlie Norman, Swedish pianist and entertainer (born 1920).
  - Francy Boland, Belgian composer and pianist (born 1929).
- 15 – Earl Zindars, American composer, Bill Evans (born 1927).
- 23 – Glenn Corneille, Dutch pianist (born 1970).

September

- 11 – Al Casey, American guitarist, Fats Waller's band (born 1915).
- 17 – Jack Lesberg, American upright bassist (born 1920).
- 25 – Georges Arvanitas, French pianist and organist (born 1931).

October

- 3 — Alfredo Rodríguez, Cuban pianist (born 1936).
- 14 – Oleg Lundstrem, Soviet and Russian composer and conductor, Oleg Lundstrem Orchestra (born 1916).
- 16 – Elmer Dresslar Jr., American voice actor and singer (born 1925).
- 20 – Shirley Horn, American singer and pianist (born 1934).

November

- 13 – Harry Gold, British saxophonist and bandleader (born 1907).
- 15 – Roy Brooks, American drummer (born 1938).
- 19 – Bob Enevoldsen, American tenor saxophonist and valve trombonist (born 1920).

December

- 5 — Harry Pepl (60), Austrian guitarist (born 1945).
- 19 – Billy Amstell, British reedist (born 1911).
- 25 – Derek Bailey, English guitarist (born 1930).
- 26 – Bill DeArango, American guitarist (born 1921).

== See also ==
- List of years in jazz
- 2000s in jazz
- 2005 in music
- 2005 in Swiss music
