= 1920 in jazz =

- Decade: 1920s in jazz
- Music: 1920 in music
- Standards: List of 1920s jazz standards

This is a detailed summary documenting events of Jazz in the year 1920.

Jazz musicians born that year included Peggy Lee, Dave Bartholomew and Dave Brubeck.

== Overview of jazz in 1920 ==
Throughout much of the 1920s, the Chicago jazz scene was developing rapidly, aided by the migration of over 40 prominent New Orleans jazz men, including the New Orleans Rhythm Kings who began playing at Friar's Inn. Additionally, following Prohibition in 1920, the cabaret business began in New York City and the growing number of speakeasies developing in cellars provided many aspiring jazz musicians with new venues. This gradually saw many musicians who had moved to Chicago ending up on the East Coast of the United States. Meanwhile, classic blues and symphonic jazz were becoming more and more prominent as additional sub genres of jazz to consider.

== Culture surrounding jazz in 1920 ==
The birth of a more urban and industrialized America was in part marked by the new style of music: jazz. Leading up to 1920, America was becoming much more industrialized which led to the decade starting off with many strikes across different fields. However, as the decade progressed, the number of those in labor unions steadily decreased. Meanwhile, just before 1920, a racial division began to emerge between black workers and the veterans they replaced during World War I. During this time, many blacks trying to get out of rural poverty moved north to big, bustling cities such as Chicago and New York City; however, racial segregation and invasions of black neighborhood by whites led to many race riots in 1919. As prohibition led to many entertainment businesses expanding to include live music performances, it opened the door for many black jazz musicians to gain a following. Allowing jazz to rise up in American culture brought many unique things to music in 1920. New instrumental, orchestral, and rhythmic techniques were introduced, as well as twelve-bar blues, emotional expressiveness, a new scale, and unique forms. In 1917, many jazz record companies began to conceal their identity because racial tension was on the rise and showed no signs of slowing down. This allowed them to overcome identity threats such as their association with illegitimate, but profitable products.

== The jazz debate in 1920 ==
"One can plausibly argue that the debate over jazz was just one of many that characterized American social discourse in the 1920s". In 1919, jazz was being described to white people as “a music originating about the turn of the twentieth century in New Orleans that featured wind instruments exploiting new timbres and performance techniques and improvisation”. On the other hand, famous jazz musician Jelly Roll Morton said jazz is centered around melody, rhythm, and harmony. While white people often saw jazz as nothing more than syncopation and technique, black jazz musicians argued that improvisation and harmony are just as important. In addition to this, although jazz has mostly black roots, most people associate it today with white musicians.

== Jazz in Chicago ==
By 1920, the African American population in Chicago was up to 109,594 out of 2,701,705 total residents. As African American culture in Chicago grew, so did racial segregation. This resulted in many black jazz musicians in 1920 having to defend their music against people who were trying to run them out of popular music and entertainment venues. After racially motivated violence broke out in Chicago in 1919, the local government created the Chicago Commission on Race Relations to hopefully help with the animosity between white people and black people in the city. In the midst of this rising racial tension, job opportunities for the majority of the black community became limited. Because many black people had previous experience playing musical instruments as a child, playing in nightclubs and other entertainment venues was proven to be one of the only options.

== Race relating to jazz in 1920 ==
Despite the racial indifference that stemmed from jazz in the United States, white people were quickly catching onto the fact that this new music style wasn’t going anywhere and would eventually just have to be accepted and embraced. Many white critics in 1920 would often refer to black jazz musicians as "savages" instead of musical artists and put down the genre altogether by saying that jazz was "strict rhythm without melody". Because jazz had caused so much segregation and tension between people living in big, urbanized cities, Chicago soon became a city of intense disconnect.

== Births ==
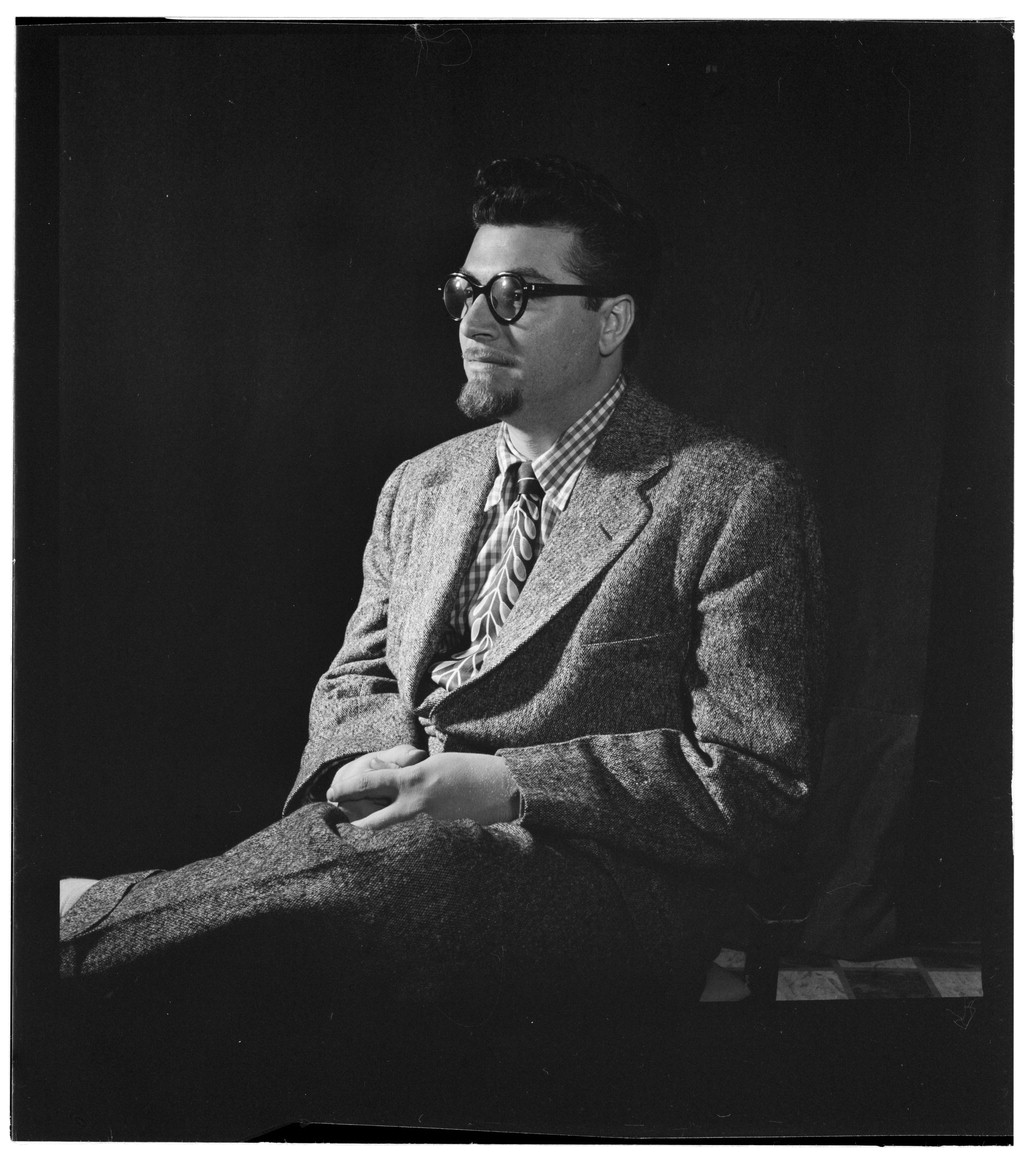
George Handy, ca. January 1947

January

- 17 – George Handy, American pianist (died 1997).
- 22 – Bob Hames, American jazz guitarist (died 1998).
- 23 – Ray Abrams, American tenor saxophonist (died 1992).
- 24 – Jimmy Forrest, American saxophonist (died 1987).
- 27 – Helmut Zacharias, German violinist (died 2002).

February

- 2 – Joe Mondragon, American bassist (died 1987).
- 3 – Alfred "Chico" Alvarez, American trumpeter (died 1992).
- 14 – Jack Lesberg, American upright bassist (died 2005).
- 21 – Sam Ranelli, American big band drummer (died 1999).
- 23
  - Gene Leis, American guitarist (died 1993).
  - Hall Overton, American composer and pianist (died 1972).
- 27 – José Melis, Cuban pianist (died 2005).

March

- 3 – Hubert Giraud, French composer and lyricist (died 2016).
- 10 – Boris Vian, French polymath: writer, poet, musician, and singer (died 1959).
- 23 – Bea Booze, American R&B and jazz singer (died 1986).
- 27 – Carl-Henrik Norin, Swedish saxophonist (died 1967).

April

- 3 – Stan Freeman, American composer, lyricist, and musician (died 2001).
- 8 – Carmen McRae, American singer, composer, pianist, and actress (died 1994).
- 9 – Art Van Damme, American accordionist (died 2010).
- 13
  - John LaPorta, American clarinetist and saxophonist (died 2004).
  - Ken Nordine, American Spoken Word Jazz Artist (died 2019).
- 14 – Gil Fuller, American arranger (died 1994).
- 22
  - Alfred Burt, American composer and trumpeter (died 1954).
  - Buzzy Drootin, American drummer (died 2000).

May

- 3 – John Lewis, American pianist and composer (died 2001).
- 11 – Beryl Bryden, English jazz singer (died 1998).
- 21 – Bill Barder, American tuba player (died 2007).
- 26
  - Peggy Lee, American singer and songwriter (died 2002).
  - Roland Shaw, English composer and band leader (died 2012).

June

- 4
  - Britt Woodman, American jazz trombonist (died 2000).
  - Ginger Smock, American violinist (died 1995).
- 5 – Kurt Edelhagen, German big band leader (died 1982).
- 11
  - Hazel Scott, Trinidad and Tobago pianist and singer (died 1981).
  - Shelly Manne, American drummer (died 1984).

July

- 2 – Herbie Harper, American trombonist (died 2012).
- 12 – Paul Gonsalves, American tenor saxophonist (died 1974).
- 16 – Elizete Cardoso, Brazilian singer and actress (died 1990).

August

- 3 – Charlie Shavers, American trumpeter (died 1971).
- 7 – Harry Arnold, Swedish jazz saxophonist (died 1971).
- 8 – Jimmy Witherspoon, American blues singer (died 1997).
- 12 – Sam Ulano, American drummer and teacher (died 2014).
- 15 – Tommy Pederson, American trombonist and composer (died 1998).
- 16 – Lennie Felix, British pianist (died 1980).
- 17 – George Duvivier, American upright bassist (died 1985).
- 18 – Don Lamond, American drummer (died 2003).
- 25 – Leonard Gaskin, American bassist (died 2009).
- 28 – Rowland Greenberg, Norwegian trumpeter (died 1994).
- 29 – Charlie Parker, American alto saxophonist (died 1955).

September

- 7 – Al Caiola, American guitarist (died 2016).
- 10 – Ken Rattenbury, English trumpeter, pianist and composer (died 2001).
- 11 – Bob Enevoldsen, American tenor saxophonist and valve trombonist (died 2005).
- 28 – Alan Davie, Scottish tenor saxophonist (died 2014).

October

- 4 – Charlie Norman, Swedish pianist and entertainer (died 2005).
- 9 – Yusef Lateef, American saxophonist (died 2013).
- 20 – Ray Linn, American trumpeter (died 1996).
- 24 – Wendell Marshall, American upright bassist (died 2002).

December

- 2 – Géo Voumard, Swiss jazz pianist (died 2008).
- 5 – Kay Davis, American singer (died 2012).
- 6 – Dave Brubeck, American pianist (died 2012).
- 11 – Eddie Johnson, American tenor saxophonist (died 2010).
- 14 – Clark Terry, American swing and bop trumpeter (died 2015).
- 21 – Marshall Brown, American trombonist (died 1983).
- 25 – Jerome Richardson, American saxophonist and flautist (died 2000).
- 29 – Irving Ashby, American jazz guitarist (died 1987).

== Bibliography ==
- The New Real Book, Volume I. Sher Music. 1988. ISBN 0-9614701-4-3.
- The New Real Book, Volume II. Sher Music. 1991. ISBN 0-9614701-7-8.
- The New Real Book, Volume III. Sher Music. 1995. ISBN 1-883217-30-X.
- The Real Book, Volume I (6th ed.). Hal Leonard. 2004. ISBN 0-634-06038-4.
- The Real Book, Volume II (2nd ed.). Hal Leonard. 2007. ISBN 978-1-4234-2452-9.
- The Real Book, Volume III (2nd ed.). Hal Leonard. 2006. ISBN 0-634-06136-4.
- The Real Jazz Book. Warner Bros. ISBN 978-91-85041-36-7.
- The Real Vocal Book, Volume I. Hal Leonard. 2006. ISBN 0-634-06080-5.
