= Morrison Records =

Morrison Records may refer to:

- Morrison Records (Australia), an independent Australian jazz record label
- Morrison Records (Seattle), an independent 20th century Seattle record label
