= 1994 in jazz =

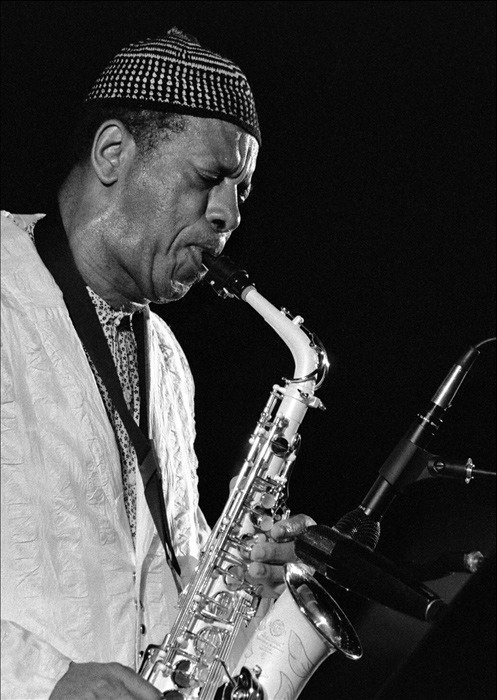
- Ornette Coleman, 1994
- Decade: 1990s in jazz
- Music: 1994 in music
- Standards: List of post-1950 jazz standards
- See also: 1993 in jazz – 1995 in jazz

This is a timeline documenting events of jazz in the year 1994.

== Events ==
=== March ===
- 25 – The 21st Vossajazz started in Vossavangen, Norway (March 25 – 27).

=== May ===
- 20 – The 23rd Moers Festival started in Moers, Germany (June 20 – 23).
- 26 – The 22nd Nattjazz started in Bergen, Norway (May 26 – June 5).

=== July ===
- 1
  - The 17th Copenhagen Jazz Festival started in Copenhagen, Denmark (July 1–10).
  - The 4th Jazz Fest Wien started in Wien, Austria (July 1–15).
  - The 15th Montreal International Jazz Festival started in Montreal, Quebec, Canada (July 1–16).
  - The 28th Montreux Jazz Festival started in Montreux, Switzerland (July 1–16).
- 8 – The 19th North Sea Jazz Festival started in The Hague (July 8–10).
- 16 – The 29th Pori Jazz started in Pori, Finland (July 16–24).
- 18 – The 35th Moldejazz started in Molde, Norway (July 18–23).

=== August ===
- 12 – The 11th Brecon Jazz Festival started in Brecon, Wales (August 12–14).

=== September ===
- 16 – The 37th Monterey Jazz Festival started in Monterey, California (September 16–18).

== Album releases ==
- Myra Melford: Even the Sounds Shine
- Toshiko Akiyoshi: Desert Lady
- Matthew Shipp: Critical Mass
- Pat Metheny: Zero Tolerance for Silence
- Henry Threadgill: Carry the Day
- Ken Vandermark: Solid Action
- Steve Coleman: Def Trance Beat
- Chick Corea: Expressions
- Misha Mengelberg: Mix
- Bobby Previte: Slay the Suitors
- Joshua Redman: MoodSwing
- Franklin Kiermyer: Solomon's Daughter
- Mark Helias: Loopin' the Cool
- Jessica Williams: Momentum
- Fred Anderson: Vintage Duets
- Norman Brown: After the Storm
- David S. Ware: Earthquation
- Eliane Elias: Solos and Duets
- Hugh Masekela: Hope
- Ray Anderson, Han Bennink and Christy Doran: Azurety
- John Surman Quartet: Stranger Than Fiction
- Wallace Roney: Mistérios
- Peter Erskine: Time Being
- Louis Sclavis and Dominique Pifarély: Acoustic Quartet
- Carol Sloane: When I Look in Your Eyes
- Edward Vesala with Sound & Fury: Nordic Gallery
- Red Sun and SamulNori: Then Comes The White Tiger
- Krakatau: Matinale
- John Abercrombie Trio: Speak of the Devil
- Trevor Watts and the Moire Music Ensemble: A Wider Embrace
- Jan Garbarek with Anouar Brahem and Ustad Shaukat Hussain: Madar
- Don Cherry with Bobo Stenson and Lennart Åberg: Dona Nostra
- Vincent Herring: The Days of Wine and Roses
- Michel Camilo: One More Once
- Marilyn Crispell: Stellar Pulsations / Three Composers
- Karl Berger: Conversations
- Charlie Haden's Quartet West: Always Say Goodbye
- European Music Orchestra: Guest

== Deaths ==
January

- 1 – James Clay, American tenor saxophonist and flutist (born 1935).
- 30 – Tiny Davis, American trumpeter and vocalist (born 1909).

February

- 8 – Raymond Scott, American composer, band leader, pianist, and electronic instrument inventor (born 1908).

March

- 9 – Maurice Purtill or Moe Purtill, American drummer, Glenn Miller Orchestra (born 1916).
- 13 – Danny Barker, American guitarist, banjoist, vocalist, and author (born 1909).
- 19 – Rafig Babayev, Azerbaijani musician and composer (born 1937).
- 24 – Tommy Benford, American drummer (born 1905).

April

- 2 – Rowland Greenberg, Norwegian trumpeter (born 1920).
- 6 – Dick Cary, American trumpeter, composer, and arranger (born 1916).
- 16 – Ralph Ellison, American novelist and literary critic (born 1913).
- 22 – Jack Bentley, English trombonist, journalist, and scriptwriter (born 1913).

May

- 23 – Joe Pass, American guitarist of Sicilian descent (born 1929).
- 25 – Eric Gale, American guitarist (born 1938).
- 26
  - Gil Fuller, American composer and arranger (born 1920).
  - Sonny Sharrock, American guitarist (born 1940).
- 27 – Red Rodney, American trumpeter (born 1927).
- 29 – Oliver Jackson, American drummer (born 1933).
- 30 – Jean Omer, Belgian reedist and bandleader (born 1912).

June

- 7 – Willie Humphrey, American clarinetist (born 1900).
- 14
  - Henry Mancini, American composer, conductor, and arranger (born 1924).
  - Lionel Grigson, British pianist, cornettist, trumpeter, and composer (born 1942).
- 21 – Dennis Berry, English saxophonist, composer, arranger, and producer (born 1921).

July

- 11 – Lex Humphries, American drummer (born 1936).

August

- 6 – Jacques Pelzer, Belgian alto saxophonist and flautist (born 1924).
- 12 – Gene Cherico, American upright bassist (born 1935).
- 18 – Charles Redland, Swedish saxophonist, bandleader, and composer (born 1911).

September

- 5 – Billy Usselton, American jazz reed player (born 1926).
- 6 – Max Kaminsky, American trumpeter and bandleader (born 1908).
- 13 – John Stevens, English drummer, Spontaneous Music Ensemble (born 1940).
- 16 – Bernie Leighton, American pianist (born 1921).
- 20 – Jimmy Hamilton, American clarinetist, tenor saxophonist, and composer (born 1917).
- 22
  - Bob Lively, American saxophonist (born 1923).
  - Leonard Feather, British pianist, composer, and producer (born 1914).
- 29 – David van Kriedt, American composer, saxophonist, and music teacher (born 1922).

October

- 3 – Scoville Browne, American reedist (born 1909).
- 4 – Danny Gatton, American guitarist (born 1945).
- 5 – Nini Rosso, Italian jazz trumpeter and composer (born 1926).
- 8 – John Neely, American tenor saxophonist and arranger (born 1930).
- 21
  - Lanny Steele, American pianist and composer (born 1933).
  - Thore Ehrling, Swedish trumpeter, composer, and bandleader (born 1912).

November

- 4 – Jack Sharpe, English saxophonist and bandleader (born 1930).
- 7 – Shorty Rogers, American trumpeter and flugelhornist (born 1924).
- 10 – Carmen McRae, American singer, composer, pianist, and actress (born 1922).
- 18 – Cab Calloway, American singer and bandleader (born 1907).
- 28 – Al Levitt, American drummer (born 1932).
- 30 – Connie Kay, American drummer (born 1927).

December

- 8 – Antonio Carlos Jobim, Brazilian composer, pianist, songwriter, arranger, and singer (born 1927).
- 14 – Mary Ann McCall, American singer (born 1919).
- 19
  - Bill Douglass, American drummer (born 1923).
  - Noel Pointer, American jazz violinist and record producer (born 1954).

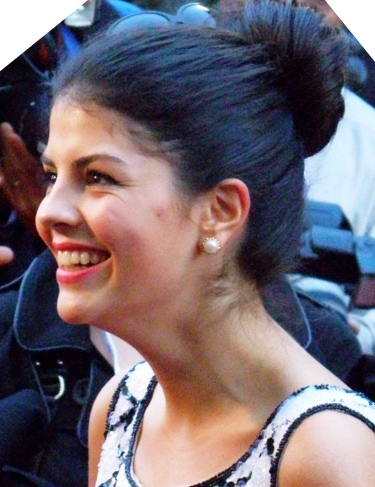
Nikki Yanofsky

== Births ==
February

- 8 – Nikki Yanofsky, Canadian singer.

March

- 23 – Gentle Bones, Singaporean singer and composer.

April

- 9 – Jo David Meyer Lysne, Norwegian guitarist and composer.

May

Unknown date

- Amalie Holt Kleive, Norwegian singer and composer.
- Billie Black, British singer.
- Veronica Swift, American singer.

== See also ==
- 1990s in jazz
- List of years in jazz
- 1994 in music
