= 1924 in jazz =

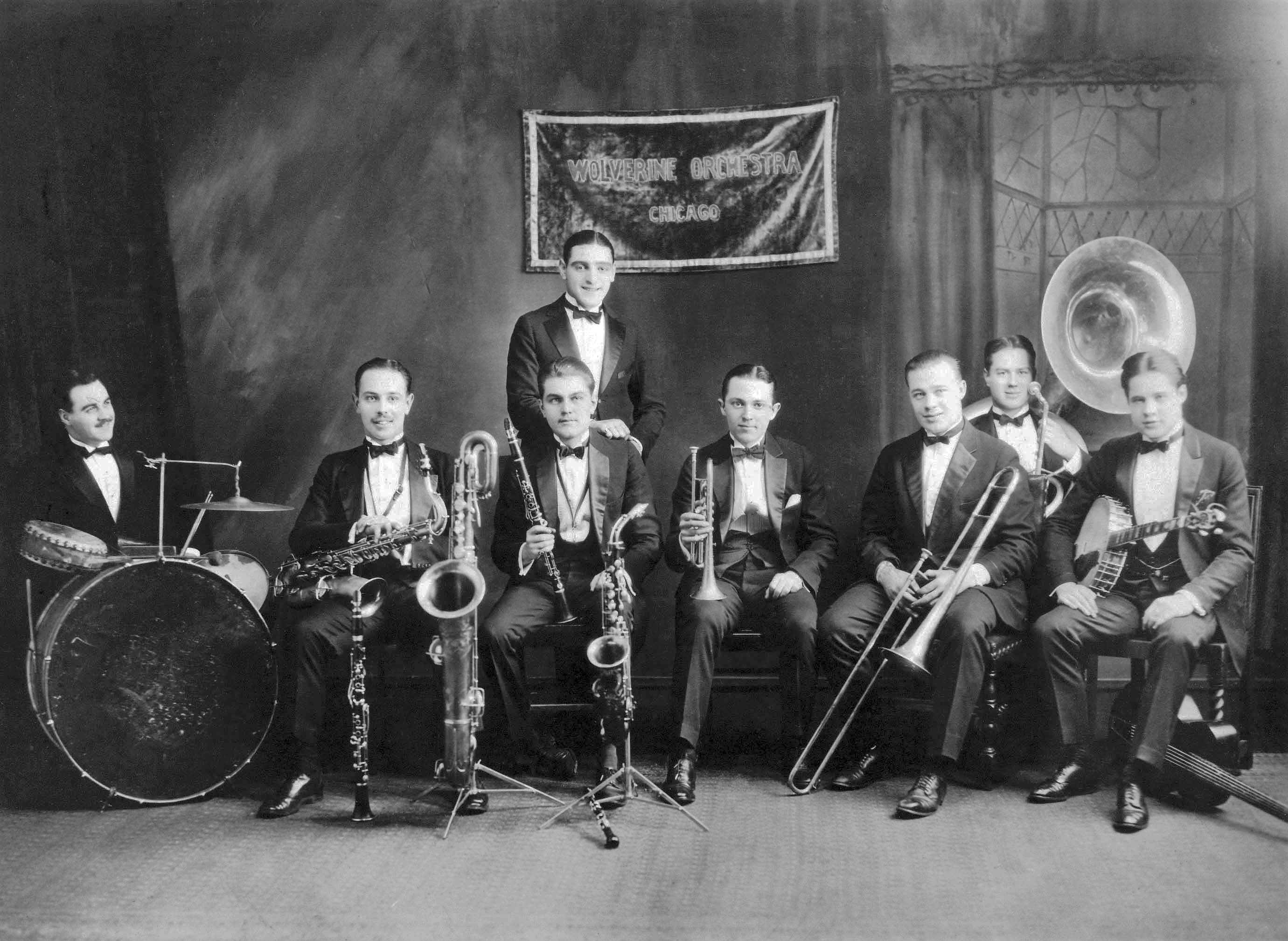
- The Wolverines with Bix Beiderbecke at Doyle's Academy of Music in Cincinnati, Ohio in 1924
- Decade: 1920s in jazz
- Music: 1924 in music
- Standards: List of 1920s jazz standards
- See also: 1923 in jazz – 1925 in jazz

This is a timeline documenting events of jazz in the year 1924.

Musicians born that year included the drummer Max Roach and singers Sarah Vaughan and Dinah Washington. In 1924, Leopold Stokowski, the British orchestral conductor of the Philadelphia Orchestra, observed that jazz had "come to stay."

== Jazz scene ==
In 1924 the improvised solo had become an integral part of most jazz performances Jazz was becoming increasingly popular in New Orleans, Kansas City, Chicago and New York City and 1924 was something of a benchmark of jazz being seen as a serious musical form. John Alden Carpenter insisted that jazz was now 'our contemporary popular music', and Irving Berlin made a statement that jazz was the "rhythmic beat of our everyday lives" and the music's "swiftness is interpretive of our verve and speed". Leopold Stokowski, the conductor of the Philadelphia Orchestra in 1924, publicly embraced jazz as a musical art form and praised jazz musicians. In 1924, George Gershwin wrote Rhapsody in Blue, widely regarded as one of the finest compositions of the 20th century, saying he conceived it "as a sort of musical kaleidoscope of America–of our vast melting pot, of our incomparable national pep, our blues, our metropolitan madness."

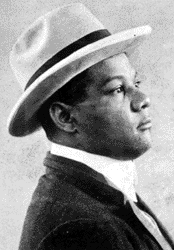
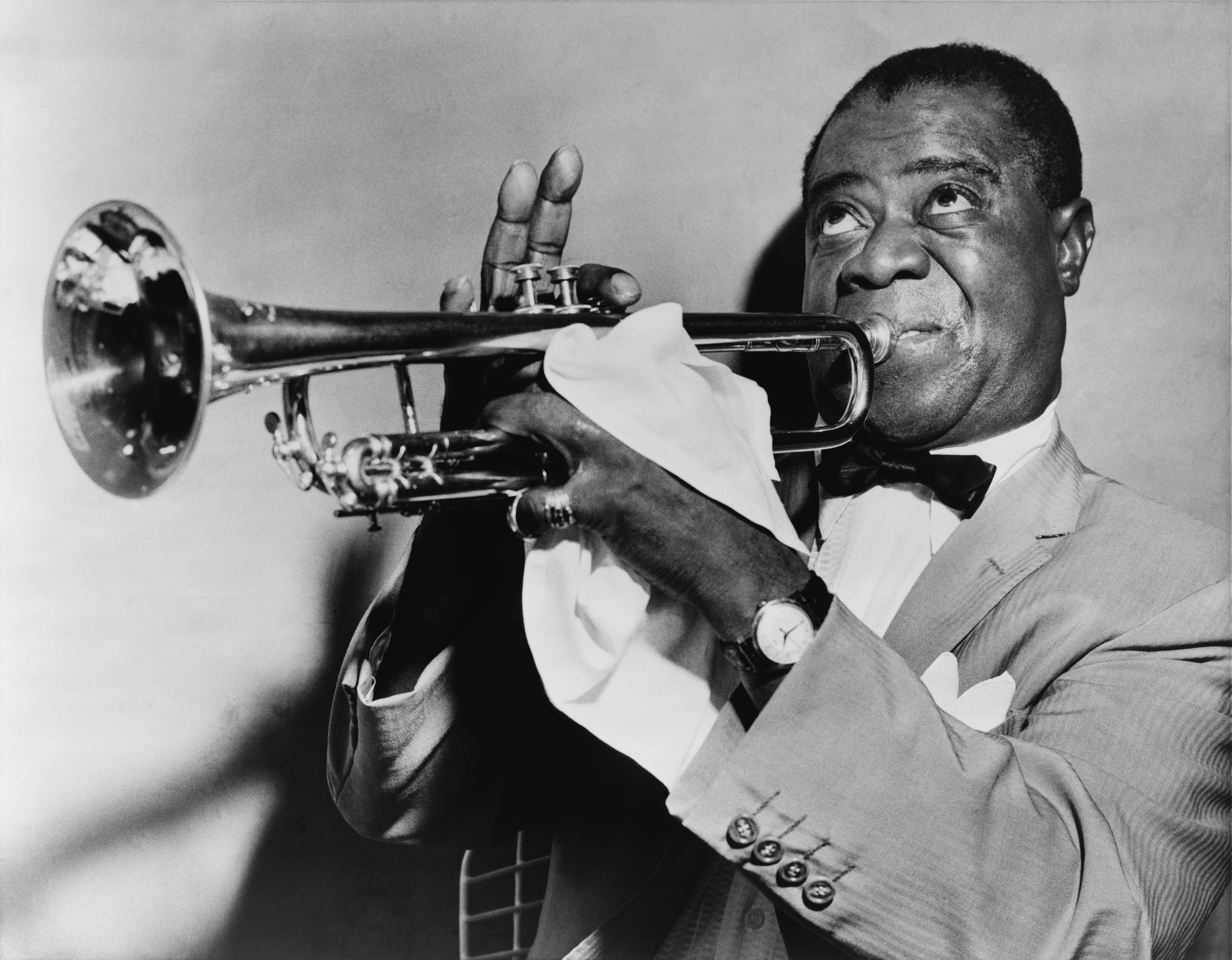
Left: Sidney Bechet. Right: Louis Armstrong.

Black jazz entrepreneur and producer Clarence Williams recorded groups in New Orleans, among them Sidney Bechet and Louis Armstrong. Williams moved from New Orleans to Chicago and opened a record store. In Chicago, Earl Hines formed a group and incidentally inhabited the neighboring apartment to Armstrong while he was in Chicago. Also in Chicago, trumpeter Tommy Ladnier begins playing in King Oliver's band. Bechet moved to New England with Ellington during the summer of 1924, playing dances.

While in 1924 in jazz, ensembles in the Kansas City area began play a style with a four even beat ground beat as opposed to a New Orleans two beat ground beat behind a 4/4 melody, European jazz included a fox trot by the Swiss composer Frank Martin for the Marionette Theatre in Paris.

Charlie Parker grew up in Kansas City listening to this style of jazz. In 1924, Django Reinhardt became a guitarist and began playing the clubs of Paris. Noted Classic Blues singer Bessie Smith began to achieve major fame.

== Events ==
- 5 February: Louis Armstrong marries pianist and composer Lil Hardin.
- 12 February: Paul Whiteman brings jazz to the concert stage, at Aeolian Hall in New York City. The concert includes such jazz tunes as Livery Stable Blues, and was the premier of George Gershwin's Rhapsody in Blue. According to jazz historian Marshall Stearns, "Paul Whiteman made jazz semi-respectable in 1924."
- 18 February: A 20-year-old Bix Beiderbecke (cornet), Min Lelbrook (tuba), Jimmy Hartwell (clarinet), George Johnson (tenor sax), Bob Gilette (banjo), Vic Moore (drums), Dick Voynow (piano) and Al Gandee (trombone) form The Wolverines and make their first recording at the Gennett studios in Richmond, Indiana with "Fidgety Feet".
- June: Armstrong quits the Oliver band upon the request of his wife much to his dismay and is later rejected by Sammy Stewart because he "wasn't dicty enough".
- July: Meyer Davis was reportedly offered a hundred dollars to come up with a new name for "jazz". Concern over the name disappeared by the end of 1924 and did not resurface until 1949 when Down Beat Magazine ran a $1000 contest in the searching for a new name, remarking that the name "jazz" had lost all significance.
- 30 September: Louis Armstrong, having left King Oliver's band in Chicago to be replaced by Lee Collins, arrives in New York City.
- October: Armstrong joins Fletcher Henderson's band in New York City upon his wife's insistence. They begin performing at the Roseland Ballroom on 51st street and Broadway in Manhattan. His new style of jazz playing greatly influences the style of other New York musicians such as Coleman Hawkins and Duke Ellington. Ellington and his Washingtonians perform at the Hollywood Club on 49th street and Broadway, whilst Bix Beiderbecke and the Wolverines, renamed Personality Kids perform at the Cinderella Ballroom on 41st street and Broadway. Hoagy Carmichael is much impressed by Beiderbecke and the Wolverines and later states, "I could feel my hands trying to shake and getting cold when I saw Bix getting out his horn. Just four notes...But he didn't blow them; he hit 'em like a mallet hits a chime..."
- 5 December – A 17-year-old Jimmy McPartland replaces Beiderbecke in the Wolverines (Personality Kids) band and violinist Dave Harmon joins. Bix reportedly quietly sat in the back of the club during the audition, later revealing himself with the compliment, "I like ya, kid. Ya sound like me, but you don't copy me." They became friends and roomed together while Bix gave McPartland pointers. At that time, Bix picked out a cornet for McPartland that he then played throughout his career.

== Standards ==
- Standards published that year included "Everybody Loves My Baby" and Jelly Roll Morton's "King Porter Stomp".
- "When My Sugar Walks Down the Street", a sweet jazz song written in 1924 by Gene Austin, Jimmy McHugh and Irving Mills. Victor Talking Machine (later known as RCA Victor) recorded the song in January 1925. Victor A&R executive Nathaniel Shilkret selected Aileen Stanley, a well-known Victor artist, and Austin, then unknown, as the recording artists, accompanied by Shilkret and the Victor Orchestra. The recording was very popular and launched Austin's career. Austin estimated his lifetime sales at 80 million records. It was recorded by the Wolverines late in 1924, Duke Ellington, and numerous other artists.

== Criticism ==
Both Europe and the US had critics of jazz in 1924. While the songwriter and music business executive Arnold Shaw wrote in 1989 that "1924 was a 'hot' year in jazz...", a columnist for The New York Times wrote in 1924 that "Jazz is to real music exactly what most of the 'new poetry,' so-called, is to real poetry. Both are without the structure and form essential to music and poetry alike, and both are the products, not of innovators, but of incompetents." The American composer and critic, Virgil Thomson, wrote in 1924 that jazz rhythm shakes but doesn't flow; it lacks a climax; and it "never gets anywhere emotionally". Jazz in 1924 was just "popular syncopated music" according to the Austrian composer Hugo Riesenfeld.

== Deaths ==
Unknown date

- Black Benny, New Orleans–based bass drummer (born 1890).

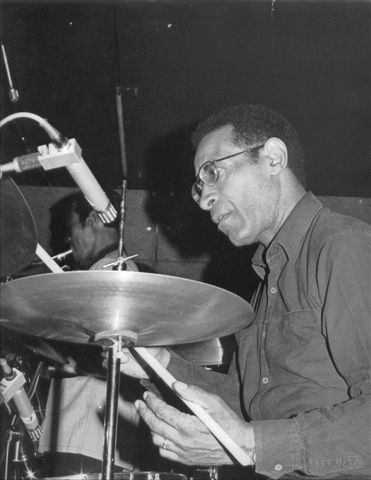
Max Roach in Holland, around 1979

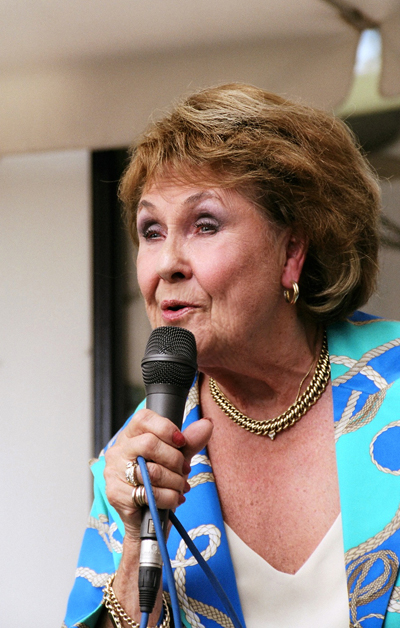
Rita Reys at Hotel De Watergeus, Noorden (The Netherlands) in 2004

== Births ==
January

- 5 – Shotaro Moriyasu, Japanese pianist (died 1955).
- 10 – Max Roach, American drummer and composer (died 2007).
- 22 – J. J. Johnson, American trombonist (died 2001).
- 24 – Joe Albany, American pianist (died 1988).
- 26
  - Alice Babs, Swedish singer and actress (died 2014).
  - Bob Bain, American guitarist (died 2018).

February

- 2
  - Dinah Kaye, Scottish singer (died 2011).
  - Sonny Stitt, American saxophonist (died 1982).
- 6 – Sammy Nestico, American composer and arranger of big band music (died 2021).
- 7 – Ray Crawford, American guitarist (died 1997).
- 15 – Jiří Šlitr, Czech songwriter, pianist, and singer (died 1969).

March

- 13 – Dick Katz, American pianist (died 2009).
- 16 – Beryl Davis, English singer (died 2011).
- 18 – Vojislav Simic, Serbian musician, conductor and composer (died 2025).
- 26 – Brew Moore, American tenor saxophonist (died 1973).
- 27 – Sarah Vaughan, American singer (died 1990).

April

- 3 – Jacky June, Belgian saxophonist, clarinetist, and bandleader (died 2012).
- 6
  - Charlie Rouse, American hard bop tenor saxophonist and flautist (died 1988).
  - Jimmy Roberts, American tenor singer (died 1999).
- 12 – Dick Marx, American pianist (died 1997).
- 14 – Shorty Rogers, American trumpet and flugelhorn player (died 1994).
- 16
  - Henry Mancini, American composer and conductor (died 1994).
  - Rudy Pompilli, American saxophonist and singer (died 1976).
- 17 – Chuck Higgins, American saxophonist (died 1999).
- 20 – Orlando DiGirolamo, American accordionist and pianist (died 1998).
- 23 – Bobby Rosengarden, American drummer (died 2007).
- 26 – Teddy Edwards, American saxophonist (died 2003).
- 28 – Blossom Dearie, American singer and pianist (died 2009).

May

- 6 – Denny Wright, English guitarist (died 1992).
- 10 – Teddy Riley, American trumpeter (died 1992).
- 11 – Oscar Valdambrini, Italian jazz trumpeter (died 1996).
- 14 – Coco Schumann, German guitarist (died 2018).
- 25 – Marshall Allen, American saxophonist.
- 30 – Armando Peraza, American percussionist (died 2014).

June

- 1
  - Hal McKusick, American alto saxophonist, clarinetist, and flutist (died 2012).
  - Herbie Lovelle, American drummer (died 2009).
- 6 – Gil Cuppini, Italian drummer and bandleader (died 1996).
- 16 – Lucky Thompson, American saxophonist (died 2005).
- 18
  - Jimmy Cheatham, American trombonist (died 2007).
  - Mat Mathews, Dutch accordionist (died 2009).
- 20 – Chet Atkins, American guitarist (died 2001).
- 24 – Jacques Pelzer, Belgian alto saxophonist and flautist (died 1994).

July

- 1 – Ruth Olay, American singer (died 2021).
- 6 – Louie Bellson, American drummer (died 2009).
- 10 – Major Holley, American upright bassist (died 1990).
- 19 – Al Haig, American pianist (died 1982).
- 22 – Bill Perkins, American saxophonist and flutist (died 2003).
- 28 – Corky Corcoran, American tenor saxophonist (died 1979).

August

- 4 – Tom Talbert, American pianist (died 2005).
- 20 – Joya Sherrill, American singer (died 2010).
- 26
  - Dick Buckley, American radio presenter (died 2010).
  - Frances Wayne, American singer (died 1978).
- 29 – Dinah Washington, American singer and pianist (died 1963).
- 30 – Kenny Dorham, American trumpeter and singer (died 1972).

September

- 1 – Stewart "Dirk" Fischer, American composer (died 2013).
- 10 – Putte Wickman, Swedish clarinetist (died 2006).
- 20 – Jackie Paris, American singer and guitarist (died 2004).
- 22 – Ray Wetzel, American trumpeter (died 1951).
- 26 – Lammar Wright, Jr., American trumpeter (died 1983).
- 27 – Bud Powell, American pianist (died 1966).

October

- 1 – Roger Williams, American pianist (died 2011).
- 7 – Marty Flax, American saxophonist (died 1972).
- 13 – Terry Gibbs, American vibraphonist and band leader.
- 19 – Pete Chilver, British guitarist and hotelier (died 2008).
- 22 – Jesse Drakes, American trumpet player (died 2010).
- 25 – Earl Palmer, American drummer (died 2008).
- 27
  - Gary Chester, American drummer (died 1987).
  - George Wallington, American pianist and composer (died 1993).

November

- 2 – Rudy Van Gelder, American recording engineer (died 2016).
- 6
  - Bruno Canfora, Italian composer, conductor, and music arranger (died 2017).
  - Dick Cathcart, American trumpeter (died 1993).
- 12 – Sam Jones, American upright bassist and cellist (died 1981).
- 25 – Paul Desmond, American saxophonist and composer (died 1977).

December

- 11 – Nunzio Rotondo, Italian trumpeter and bandleader (died 2009).
- 20 – Arne Domnérus, Swedish saxophonist and clarinetist (died 2008).
- 21 – Rita Reys, Dutch singer (died 2013).
- 24 – Pupo De Luca, Italian actor and musician (died 2006).
- 31 – Wilbur Harden, American trumpeter (died 1969).

== Bibliography ==
- Giddins, Gary (2000). Visions of Jazz: The First Century. Oxford University Press US. ISBN 978-0-19-513241-0.
- Jasen, David A. (2003). Tin Pan Alley: An Encyclopedia of the Golden Age of American Song. Taylor & Francis. ISBN 978-0-415-93877-8.
- Jasen, David A. (2007). Ragtime: An Encyclopedia, Discography, and Sheetography. CRC Press. ISBN 978-0-415-97862-0.
- Nollen, Scott Allen (2004). Louis Armstrong: The Life, Music, and Screen Career. McFarland. ISBN 978-0-7864-1857-2.
- Oliphant, Dave (1996). Texan Jazz. University of Texas Press. ISBN 978-0-292-76045-5.
- Schuller, Gunther (1991). The Swing Era: The Development of Jazz, 1930–1945. Oxford University Press US. ISBN 978-0-19-507140-5.
- Shaw, Arnold (1989). The jazz age: popular music in the 1920s. Oxford University Press US. ISBN 978-0-19-506082-9.
- Sudhalter, Richard M. (2003). Stardust Melody: The Life and Music of Hoagy Carmichael. Oxford University Press US. ISBN 978-0-19-516898-3.
