= 1929 in jazz =

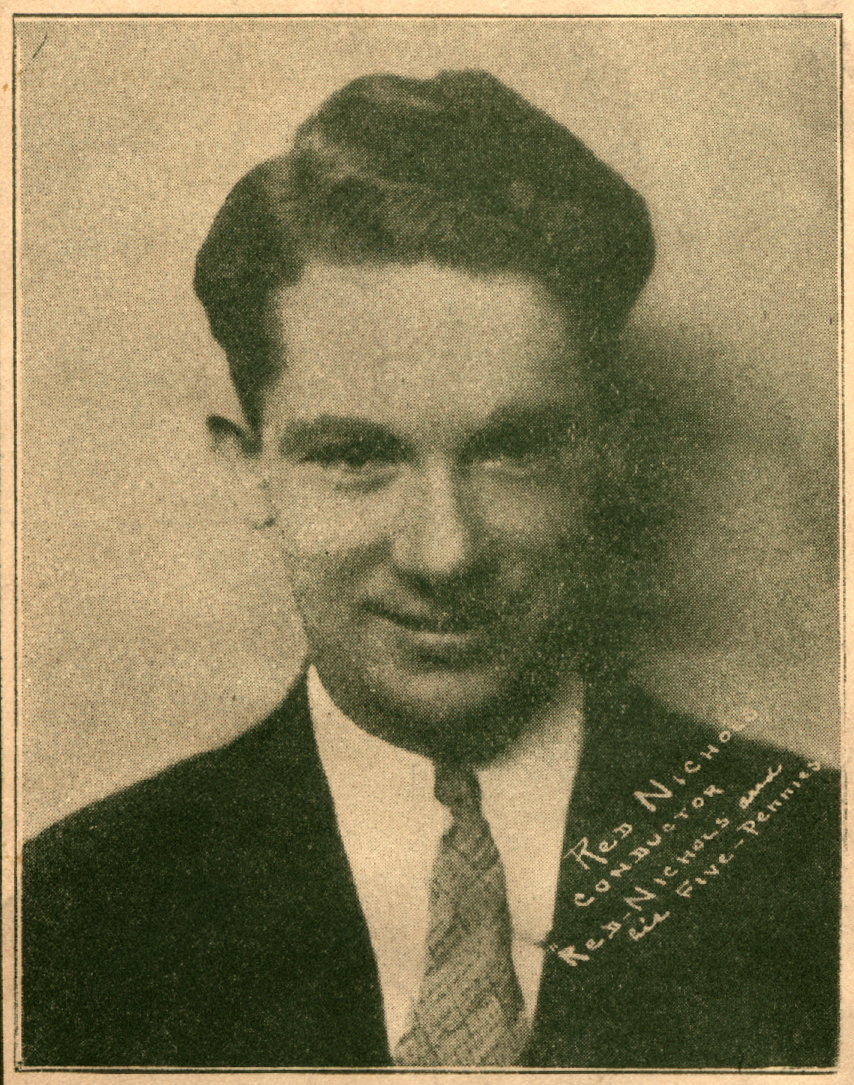
- Red Nichols (1905–1965), American jazz cornetist. Sheet music cover for On The Alamo by Gus Kahn & Isham Jones
- Decade: 1920s in jazz
- Music: 1929 in music
- Standards: List of 1920s jazz standards
- See also: 1928 in jazz – 1930 in jazz

This is a timeline documenting events of jazz in 1929.

Jazz musicians born that year included Chet Baker and Joe Pass.

== Standards ==
- In 1929 the standards "Ain't Misbehavin'", "Black and Blue" and "Honeysuckle Rose" were published.

== Deaths ==
March

- 15 – Pinetop Smith, American pianist (born 1904).

June

- 2 – Don Murray, American clarinet and saxophone player (born 1904).

August

- 19 – Chris Kelly, American trumpeter (born 1890).

December

- 19 – Blind Lemon Jefferson, American singer, songwriter, and musician (born 1893).

== Births ==
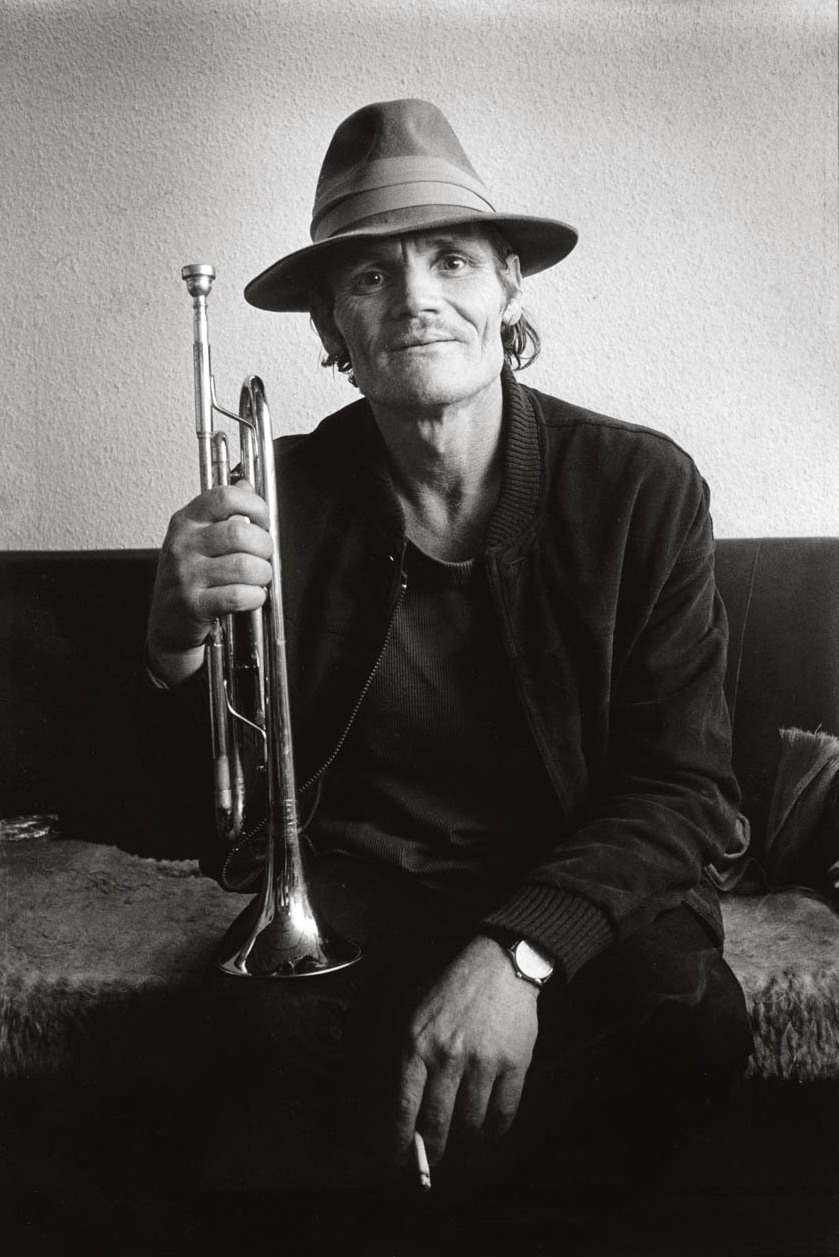
Chet Baker, American jazz trumpeter, flugelhorn player and singer, in Belgium 1983

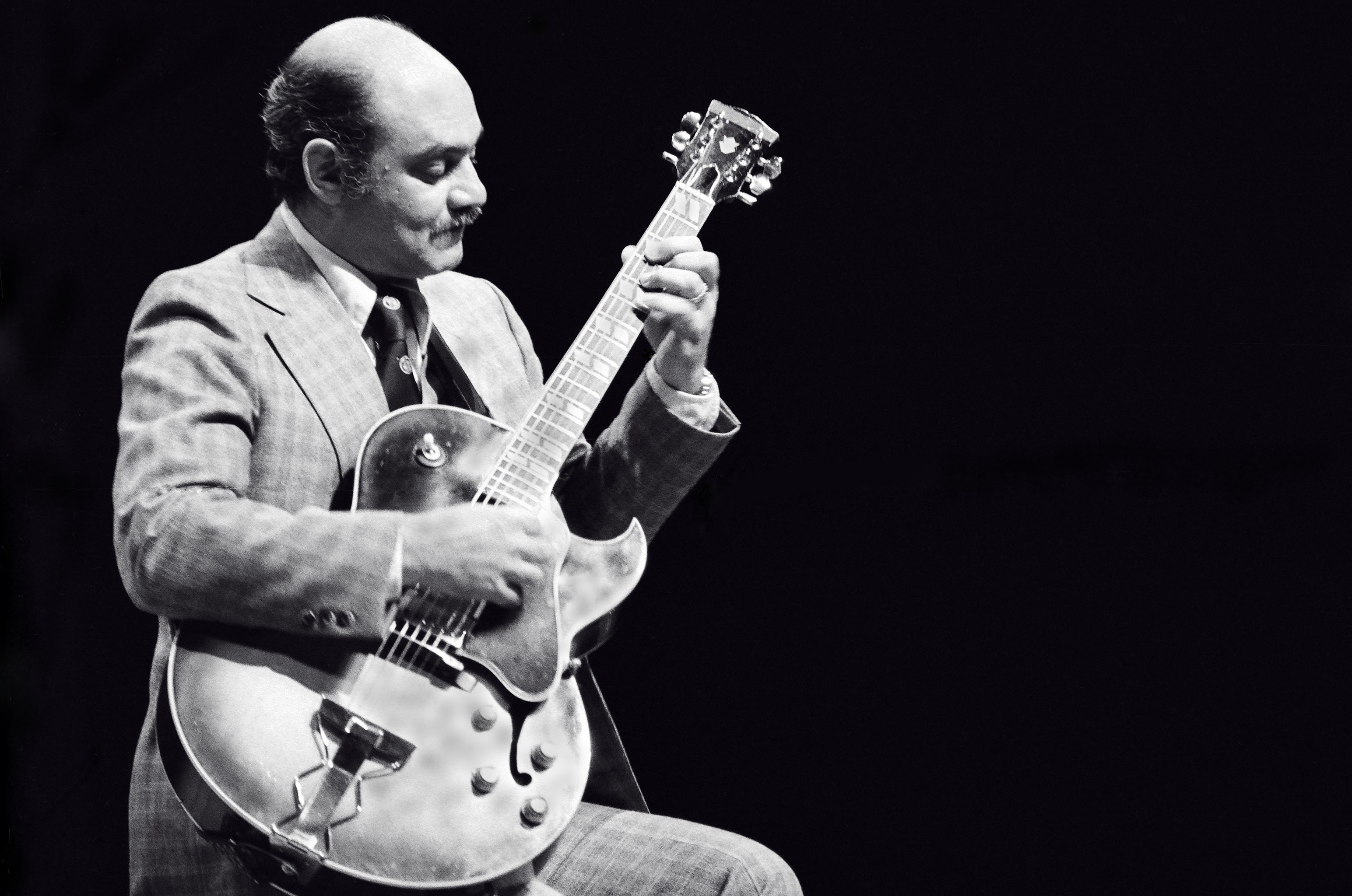
Joe Pass in 1975

January

- 1 – Arthur Prysock, American singer (died 1997).
- 4 – Al Dreares, American drummer (died 2011).
- 12 – Rich Matteson, American euphoniumist (died 1993).
- 13 – Joe Pass, American guitarist (died 1994).
- 16 – G. T. Hogan, American drummer (died 2004).
- 20 – Jimmy Cobb, American drummer (died 2020).
- 23 – Harold Ousley, American tenor saxophonist and flautist (died 2015).
- 25 – Benny Golson, American saxophonist (died 2024).
- 28 – Acker Bilk, English clarinettist and vocalist (died 2014).
- 29 – Ed Shaughnessy, American drummer (died 2013).

February

- 7 – Dave Shepherd, English clarinettist (died 2016).
- 13 – Frankie Sakai, Japanese comedian, actor, and musician (died 1996).
- 25
  - Sandy Brown, Scottish clarinettist (died 1975).
  - Tommy Newsom, American saxophonist (died 2007).
- 27 – Betty Loo Taylor, Hawaii-American pianist (died 2016).

March

- 1 – Eddie Jones, American upright bassist (died 1997).
- 3 – Dupree Bolton, American trumpeter (died 1993).
- 17 – Simon Flem Devold, Norwegian clarinetist and columnist (died 2015).
- 19 – Gene Taylor, American dupright bassist (died 2001).
- 20 – Sonny Russo, American trombonist (died 2013).
- 22 – Fred Anderson, American tenor saxophonist (died 2010).
- 25 – Cecil Taylor, American pianist and poet (died 2018).
- 26 – Maurice Simon, American saxophonist (died 2019).
- 30 – Valdo Williams, Canadian pianist (died 2010).

April

- 4 –Buster Cooper, American trombonist (died 2016).
- 6
  - Art Taylor, American drummer (died 1995).
  - Edmund Percey, English architect and pianist (died 2014).
  - Guylaine Guy, Canadian singer and painter (died 2024).
- 8 – Eiji Kitamura, Japanese clarinetist.
- 17 – James Last, German bassist, composer, and big band leader (died 2015).
- 18 – Walt Levinsky, American clarinetist (died 1999).
- 29 – Ray Barretto, American percussionist (died 2006).

May

- 10 – Mel Lewis, American drummer (died 1990).
- 16 – Betty Carter, American singer and bandleader (died 1998).
- 17 – Karl Drewo, Austrian saxophonist (died 1995).
- 21 – Larance Marable, American drummer (died 2012).
- 23 – Julian Euell, American bassist (died 2019).
- 29 – Sandy Mosse, American saxophonist (died 1983).

June

- 1 – Lennie Niehaus, American alto saxophonist, arranger, and composer (died 2020).
- 2 – Gildo Mahones, American pianist (died 2018).
- 8 – Kenny Clare, English drummer (died 1985).
- 14 – Cy Coleman, American composer and songwriter (died 2004).

July

- 9 – Alex Welsh, Scottish singer, cornetist, and trumpeter (died 1982).
- 13 – Pedro Iturralde, Spanish saxophonist, saxophone teacher and composer (died 2020).
- 14 – Alan Dawson, American drummer (died 1996).
- 17 – Joe Morello, American drummer (died 2011).
- 23 – Danny Barcelona, Filipino-American drummer (died 2007).
- 26 – Charlie Persip, American drummer (died 2020).

August

- 2 – Roy Crimmins, English trombonist and composer (died 2014).
- 5 – John Armatage, English drummer and arranger.
- 6 – Mike Elliott, Jamaican saxophonist.
- 14 – Lorez Alexandria, American singer (died 2001).
- 16 – Bill Evans, American pianist (died 1980).
- 23 – Pete King, British saxophonist (died 2009).
- 29 – Algia Mae Hinton, American guitarist and singer (died 2018).

September

- 6 – Charles Moffett, American drummer (died 1997).
- 7 – Harry South, English pianist, composer, and arranger (died 1990).
- 10 – Prince Lasha, American saxophonist, flautist, and clarinetist (died 2008).
- 17 – Sil Austin, American saxophonist (died 2001).
- 18 – Teddi King, American singer (died 1977).
- 19 – Mel Stewart, American saxophonist and actor (died 2002).
- 20 – Joe Temperley, Scottish saxophonist (died 2016).
- 24 – John Carter, American clarinetist and saxophonist (died 1991).
- 27 – Calvin Jones, American trombonist, bassist, and composer (died 2004).
- 29 – Rolf Kühn, German clarinetist and saxophonist (died 2022).

October

- 2 – Howard Roberts, American guitarist (died 1992).
- 10
  - Ayten Alpman, Turkish singer (died 2012).
  - Ed Blackwell, American drummer (died 1992).
- 11 - Ludek Hulan, Czech upright bassist (died 1979).
- 19 – Jack Noren, American drummer (died 1990).
- 22 – Giorgio Gaslini, Italian pianist, composer, and conductor (died 2014).
- 24 – Dan Morgenstern, German-born American jazz historian (died 2024).
- 27 – Elmon Wright, American trumpeter (died 1984).

November

- 1 – Gabe Baltazar, Asian-American alto saxophonist and woodwind doubler (died 2022).
- 25 – Rusty Bryant, American saxophonist (died 1991).
- 29 – Francy Boland, Belgian composer and pianist (died 2005).

December

- 12 – Toshiko Akiyoshi, Japanese composer, bandleader, and pianist.
- 15 – Barry Harris, American pianist and bandleader (died 2021).
- 18 – Nick Stabulas, American drummer (died 1973).
- 19 – Bob Brookmeyer, American trombonist, pianist, arranger, and bandleader (died 2011).
- 22 – Red Balaban, American tubist and sousaphonist (died 2013).
- 23 – Chet Baker, American trumpeter and singer (died 1988).
- 24 – Noel DaCosta, Nigerian-Jamaican composer and violinist (died 2002).
- 29
  - Matt Murphy, American guitarist, The Blues Brothers (died 2018).
  - Susie Garrett, African-American singer and actress (died 2002).

Unknown date

- Jacques Denjean, French composer and arranger, Les Double Six (died 1995).
- Yusuf Salim, American pianist and composer (died 2008).

== Bibliography ==
- The New Real Book, Volume I. Sher Music. 1988. ISBN 0-9614701-4-3.
- The New Real Book, Volume II. Sher Music. 1991. ISBN 0-9614701-7-8.
- The New Real Book, Volume III. Sher Music. 1995. ISBN 1-883217-30-X.
- The Real Book, Volume I (6th ed.). Hal Leonard. 2004. ISBN 0-634-06038-4.
- The Real Book, Volume II (2nd ed.). Hal Leonard. 2007. ISBN 978-1-4234-2452-9.
- The Real Book, Volume III (2nd ed.). Hal Leonard. 2006. ISBN 0-634-06136-4.
- The Real Jazz Book. Warner Bros. ISBN 978-91-85041-36-7.
- The Real Vocal Book, Volume I. Hal Leonard. 2006. ISBN 0-634-06080-5.
