= 1930 in jazz =

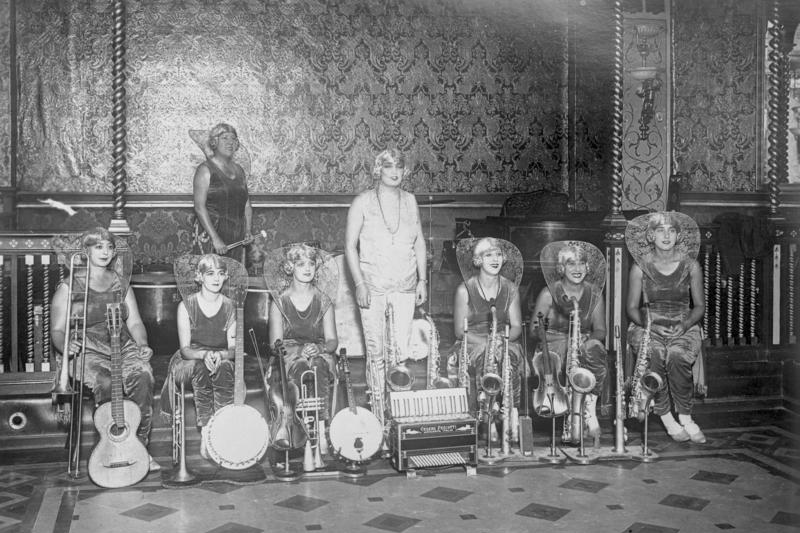
- The Italian female jazz band "Delores" in 1930
- Decade: 1930s in jazz
- Music: 1930 in music
- Standards: List of 1930s jazz standards
- See also: 1929 in jazz – 1931 in jazz

This is a timeline documenting events of Jazz in the year 1930.

Musicians born that year included Ornette Coleman, Herbie Mann, Helen Merrill, Sonny Rollins, Ray Charles and Clifford Brown.

== Events ==
- The Great Depression had started. Unemployment rates had risen to 25% of the workforce, and up to 60% of African American men were out of work. Cities were crowded with workseekers. Black musicians were not allowed to play in studios or on radio. However, jazz music was resilient. While businesses, including the record industry, were down, the dance halls were packed with people dancing the jitterbug to the music of big bands, which would come to be called swing music.

== Standards ==
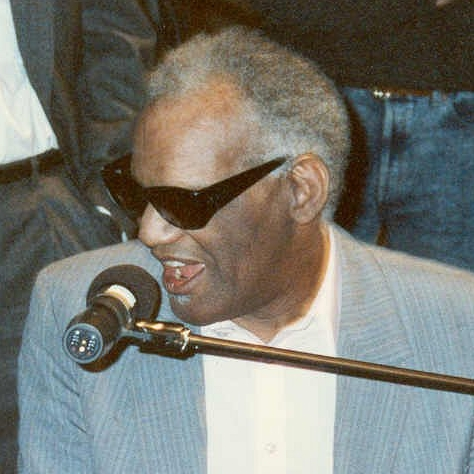
Ray Charles at Grammy Awards rehearsal, 1990

- In 1930 standards published included "Body and Soul", "But Not for Me" and "Embraceable You".

== Births ==
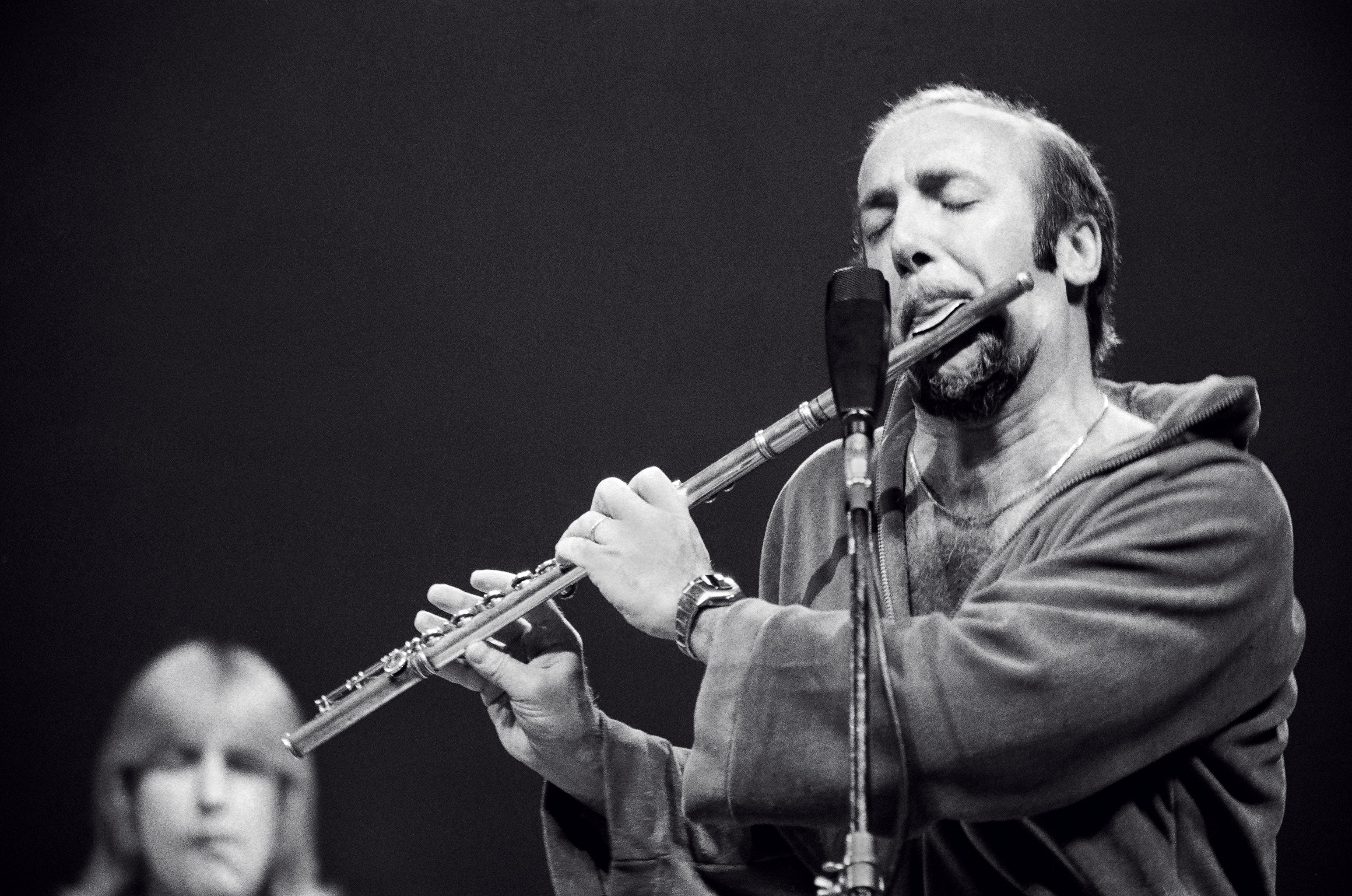
Will Lee & Herbie Mann at the Eastman Theatre, Rochester, N.Y. 1975

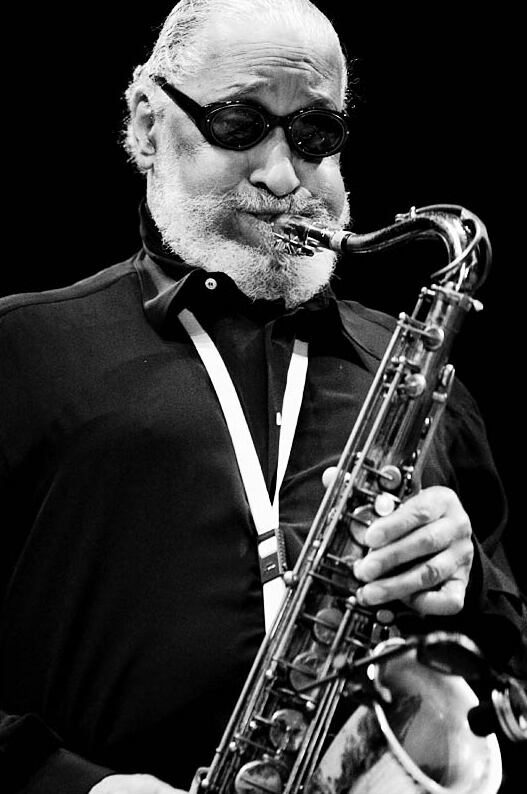
Sonny Rollins in concert, 2007

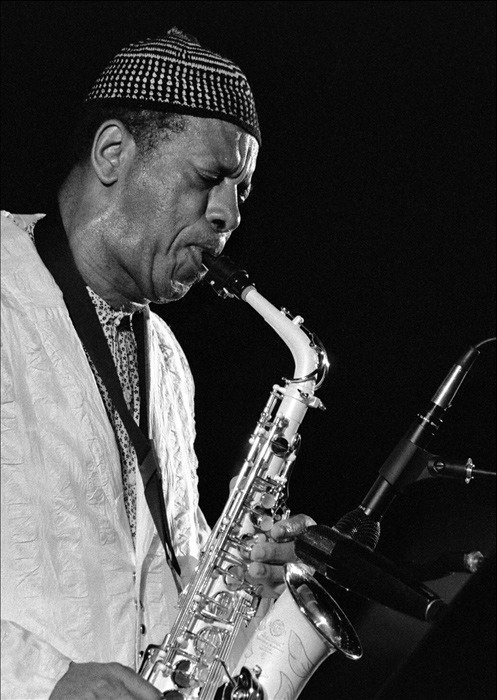
Ornette Coleman in 1994

January

- 1 – Ack van Rooyen, Dutch trumpeter and flugelhornist (died 2021).
- 5 – Oscar Klein, Austrian trumpeter (died 2006).
- 11
  - Jack Nimitz, American baritone saxophonist (died 2009).
  - Johnny Varro, American pianist.
- 14 – Kenny Wheeler, Canadian composer and trumpeter (died 2014).
- 16 – Spike Robinson, British tenor saxophonist (died 2001).
- 23 – Erich Kleinschuster, Austrian trombonist and bandleader (died 2018).
- 29
  - Derek Bailey, English guitarist (died 2005).
  - John Neely, American saxophonist (died 1994).
- 30 – Buddy Montgomery, American vibraphonist and pianist (died 2009).

February

- 5 – Don Goldie, American trumpeter (died 1995).
- 8 – Joe Maini, American alto saxophonist (died 1964).
- 10 – Shungo Sawada, Japanese guitarist (died 2006).
- 24 – Richard B. Boone, American musician and scat singer (died 1999).
- 28 – Marty Grosz, American guitarist, banjoist, singer, and composer.

March

- 1 – Benny Powell, American trombonist (died 2010).
- 3 – Bob Hammer, American jazz pianist, composer and arranger.
- 9
  - Ornette Coleman, American saxophonist, violinist, and trumpeter (died 2015).
  - Vic Ash, English saxophonist and clarinetist (died 2014).
- 13 – Blue Mitchell, American trumpeter and composer (died 1979).
- 14 – Ed Wiley Jr., American tenor saxophonist (died 2010).
- 16 – Tommy Flanagan, American jazz pianist and composer (died 2001).
- 17
  - Grover Mitchell, American trombonist (died 2003).
  - Paul Horn, American flautist and saxophonist (died 2014).
- 18 – Pat Halcox, English trumpeter (died 2013).
- 26 – Sivuca, Brazilian accordionist and guitarist (died 2006).
- 28
  - Bill Hughes, American trombonist and bandleader (died 2018).
  - Eric Dixon, American saxophonist (died 1989).

April

- 10 – Claude Bolling, French pianist and composer (died 2020).
- 15
  - Herb Pomeroy, American trumpeter (died 2007).
  - Richard Davis, American upright bassist (died 2023).
- 16 – Herbie Mann, American flutist (died 2003).
- 17
  - Chris Barber, English bandleader and trombonist (died 2021).
  - Sam Noto, American trumpeter.
- 23 – Mikkel Flagstad, Norwegian saxophonist (died 2005).
- 24 – Frank Strazzeri, American pianist (died 2014).
- 29 – Joe Porcaro, American drummer (died 2020).

May

- 1 – Little Walter, American singer and harmonica player (died 1968).
- 3 – Bob Havens, American trombonist.
- 4 – Bill Eyden, English drummer (died 2004).
- 5 – Joyce Collins, American pianist and singer (died 2010).
- 8 – Papa Bue, Danish trombonist (died 2011).
- 13 – Erik Moseholm, Danish bassist (died 2012).
- 16 – Friedrich Gulda, Austrian pianist and composer (died 2000).
- 18 – Mike Zwerin, American trombonist and author (died 2010).
- 21 – Tommy Bryant, American upright bassist (died 1982).
- 22 – Kenny Ball, English trumpeter, bandleader, and vocalist (died 2013).
- 30 – Dave McKenna, American pianist (died 2008).

June

- 3 – Dakota Staton, American singer (died 2007).
- 4 – Morgana King, American singer and actress (died 2018).
- 11 – Roy Fisher, British poet and pianist (died 2017).
- 16 – Marilyn Moore, American singer (died 1992).
- 26 – Jimmy Deuchar, Scottish trumpeter (died 1993).

July

- 2 – Ahmad Jamal, American jazz pianist and composer (died 2023).
- 3
  - Pete Fountain, American jazz clarinetist (died 2016).
  - Ron Collier, Canadian jazz trombonist (died 2003).
  - Ronnell Bright, American jazz pianist (died 2021).
  - Tommy Tedesco, American guitarist (died 1997).
- 7 – Hank Mobley, American saxophonist and composer (died 1986).
- 9 – Buddy Bregman, American arranger, producer, and composer (died 2017).
- 14 – Sabu Martinez, American conguero and percussionist (died 1979).
- 23 – Richie Kamuca, American jazz tenor saxophonist (died 1977).
- 25 – Annie Ross, British-American singer and actress (died 2020).
- 27
  - Andy White, Scottish drummer (died 2015).
  - Einar Iversen, Norwegian pianist and composer (died 2019).

August

- 2 – Eddie Locke, American drummer (died 2009).
- 6 – Abbey Lincoln, American singer and songwriter (died 2010).
- 11 – John Fischer, American pianist (died 2016).
- 12 – Stan Greig, Scottish pianist, drummer, and bandleader (died 2012).
- 14 – Eddie Costa, American pianist (died 1962).
- 19 – Jack Sharpe, English saxophonist and bandleader (died 1994).
- 21 – Christiane Legrand, French soprano, The Swingle Singers (died 2011).
- 22 – Rolf Billberg, Swedish alto saxophonist (died 1966).
- 31 – Big Tiny Little, American pianist (died 2010).

September

- 7
  - Francis Coppieters, Belgian pianist (died 1990).
  - Sonny Rollins, American tenor saxophonist (died 2026).
- 8 – Walter Benton, American tenor saxophonist (died 2000).
- 14 – Bill Berry, American trumpeter, Duke Ellington Orchestra (died 2002).
- 19 – Muhal Richard Abrams, American clarinetist, cellist, and jazz pianist (died 2017).
- 20 – Eddie Bo, American singer and pianist (died 2009).
- 23
  - Irene Reid, American singer (died 2008).
  - Ray Charles, American singer-songwriter (died 2004).
- 27 – Gerhard Aspheim, Norwegian trombonist (died 2009).

October

- 3 – Nancy Harrow, American jazz singer and songwriter.
- 7 – George Girard, American trumpeter (died 1957).
- 8 – Pepper Adams, American baritone saxophonist and composer (died 1986).
- 28 – John Mayer, Indian composer (died 2004).
- 30 – Clifford Brown, American trumpeter (died 1956).
- 31 – Booker Ervin, American saxophonist (died 1970).

November

- 2 – Maxine Daniels, English singer (died 2003).
- 11 – Hank Garland, American guitarist (died 2004).
- 14 – Jay Migliori, American saxophonist (died 2001).
- 17 – David Amram, American composer, conductor, and multi-instrumentalist.

December

- 4 – Jim Hall, American guitarist (died 2013).
- 13 – Ben Tucker, American upright bassist (murder) (died 2013).
- 16 – Sam Most, American jazz flautist, clarinetist and saxophonist (died 2013).
- 28 – Ed Thigpen, American drummer (died 2010).

Unknown date

- Derek Humble, English alto saxophonist (died 1971).
- Donald Washington Sr., American saxophonist (died 2009).
- Jackie Dougan, British drummer (died 1973).

== See also ==
- 1930 in music
