= Jimmy "Jammin'" Smith =

American jazz musician (1926–1953)

James Darwin Smith (1926–1953) was an American jazz trumpet player who reached his peak in the early 1950s.

After a bebop debut with Miles Davis in a small group setting, Smith continued to record for Blue Note and played a number of gigs in Chicago. His first self-composed stylistic jazz was a piece called "Cold Jammin", which earned him his nickname Jimmy "Jammin" Smith. Smith died at the early age of 27 from a heroin overdose after one of his concerts.
