= 2000s in jazz =

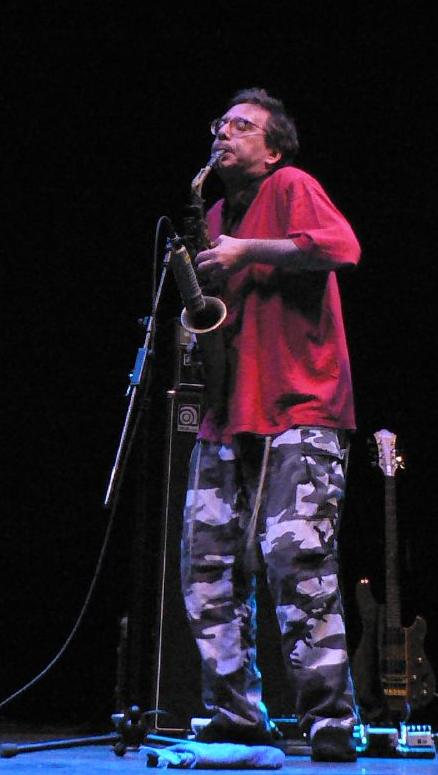
John Zorn performing in 2006.

In the 2000s in jazz, there was a gradual decline in popularity for the smooth jazz subgenre which had flourished in the previous decade

In the 2000s, a number of young musicians emerged, including the US band The Bad Plus, pianists Brad Mehldau, Jason Moran and Vijay Iyer, guitarist Kurt Rosenwinkel, vibraphonist Stefon Harris, trumpeters Roy Hargrove and Terence Blanchard, bassist/singer Esperanza Spalding, and bassist Christian McBride. Well-established jazz musicians, such as Dave Brubeck, Wynton Marsalis, Sonny Rollins, Wayne Shorter, Jessica Williams, Michael Franks and George Benson, continued to perform and record.

== 2000 ==
=== Events ===
January

- 28 – The 3rd Polarjazz started in Longyearbyen, Svalbard (February 28 – 30).

April

- 14 – The 27th Vossajazz started in Vossavangen, Norway (April 14 – 16).

May

- 10 – The 11th MaiJazz started in Stavanger, Norway (May 10 – 14).
- 25 – The 28th Nattjazz started in Bergen, Norway (May 25 – June 3).

June

- 9 – The 29th Moers Festival started in Moers, Germany (June 9 – 12).
- 13 – The 10th Jazz Fest Wien started in Wien, Austria (June 13 – July 9).
- 29 – The 21st Montreal International Jazz Festival started in Montreal, Quebec, Canada (June 29 – July 9).

July

- 5 – The 37th Kongsberg Jazzfestival started in Kongsberg, Norway (July 5 – 8).
- 7 – The 34th Montreux Jazz Festival started in Montreux, Switzerland (July 7 – 22).
- 11 – The 53rd Nice Jazz Festival started in Nice, France (July 11 – 18).
- 14
  - The 25th North Sea Jazz Festival started in The Hague (July 14 – 16).
  - The 35th Pori Jazz started in Pori, Finland (July 14 – 23).
- 17 – The 40th Moldejazz started in Molde, Norway (July 17 – 22).
- 21 – The 35th San Sebastian Jazz Festival started in San Sebastian, Spain (July 21 – 26).

August

- 9 – The 14th Sildajazz started in Haugesund, Norway (August 9 – 13).
- 11
  - The 46th Newport Jazz Festival started in Newport, Rhode Island (August 11 – 13).
  - The 15th Oslo Jazzfestival started in Oslo, Norway (August 11–19).
- 13 – The 17th Brecon Jazz Festival started in Brecon, Wales (August 13 – 15).

September

- 15 – The 43rd Monterey Jazz Festival started in Monterey, California (September 15 – 17).

October

- 12 – The DølaJazz started in Lillehammer, Norway (October 12 – 15).

November

- 2 – The Trondheim Jazz Festival started in Trondheim, Norway (November 2 – 5).
- 15 – The 9th London Jazz Festival started in London, England (November 15 – 24).

=== Album releases ===
- Pat Metheny: Trio 99 → 00 (Warner Bros.)
- Joshua Redman: Beyond (Warner Bros.)
- Parker / Guy / Lytton and Marilyn Crispell: After Appleby (Leo Records)
- Branford Marsalis Quartet: Contemporary Jazz (Columbia)
- Dave Douglas: El Trilogy (BMG)
- Guillermo Gregorio: Faktura (Hat[now]Art)
- Pat Metheny: Trio → Live (Warner Bros.)
- Joe Maneri: Going To Church (AUM Fidelity)
- Marilyn Crispell: Red (Black Saint)
- Myra Melford: Dance Beyond the Color (Arabesque)
- The Rippingtons: Life in the Tropics (Peak)
- Spring Heel Jack: Disappeared (Thirsty Ear)
- Pat Metheny & The Heath Brothers + Ralph Towner & Charlie Haden: Move To The Groove (West Wind)
- World Saxophone Quartet: Requiem for Julius (Justin Time)
- Terence Blanchard: Wandering Moon (Sony Classical)
- Misha Mengelberg: Solo (BUZZ Records)
- Bill Dixon: Papyrus Volume I (Soul Note)
- Bill Dixon: Papyrus Volume II (Soul Note)
- Marty Ehrlich's Traveler's Tales: Malinke's Dance (OmniTone)
- Magni Wentzel: Porgy and Bess (Hot Club)
- Olga Konkova Trio: Northern Crossings (Candid)
- Hugh Masekela: Sixty (Shanachie)

=== Deaths ===
January

- 2 – Nat Adderley, American trumpeter (born 1931).
- 4 – Roger Frampton, Australian pianist, saxophonist, composer, and educator (born 1948).
- 16 – Gene Harris, American pianist (born 1933).
- 20 – Don Abney, American pianist (born 1923).
- 25 – Lin Halliday, American saxophonist (born 1936).
- 31 – Si Zentner, American trombonist and big-band leader (born 1917).

February

- 15 – Gus Johnson, American drummer (born 1913).
- 29 – Hidehiko Matsumoto, Japanese saxophonist and bandleader (born 1926).

March

- 6 – Ole Jacob Hansen, Norwegian drummer (born 1940).
- 13 – Cab Kaye, English singer and pianist (born 1921).
- 18 – Randi Hultin, Norwegian jazz critic and impresario (born 1926).
- 24 – Al Grey, American trombonist (born 1925).

April

- 13 – Pete Minger, American trumpeter (born 1943).
- 29 – Jonah Jones, American trumpeter (born 1909)

May

- 2
  - Billy Munn, British pianist and arranger (born 1911).
  - Teri Thornton, American singer (born 1934).
- 21 – Buzzy Drootin, American drummer (born 1920).
- 31 – Tito Puente, American drummer, songwriter, and record producer (born 1923).

June

- 3 – Glenn Horiuchi, American jazz pianist, composer, and shamisen player (born 1955).
- 7 – Clint Houston, American upright bassist (born 1946).
- 12 – Bruno Martino, Italian jazz composer, singer, and pianist (born 1925).
- 22 – Svein Finnerud, Norwegian pianist, painter, and graphic artist (born 1945).
- 23 – Jerome Richardson, American saxophonist and flautist (born 1920).
- 25 – Wilson Simonal, Brazilian singer (born 1938).

July

- 6 – Akira Miyazawa, Japanese saxophonist, clarinetist, and flautist (born 1927).

August

- 14 – Walter Benton, American tenor saxophonist (born 1930).
- 20 – Chris Columbus, American drummer (born 1902).
- 25 – Jack Nitzsche, American musician, arranger, songwriter, record producer, and film score composer (born 1937).

September

- 12 – Stanley Turrentine, American tenor saxophonist (born 1934).
- 22 – Willie Cook, American trumpeter (born 1923).
- 26
  - Baden Powell, Brazilian guitarist and composer (born 1937).
  - Nick Fatool, American drummer (born 1915).

October

- 6 – Pat Flowers, American pianist and singer (born 1917).
- 11 – Sture Nordin, Swedish upright bassist (born 1933).
- 13 – Britt Woodman, American trombonist (born 1920).
- 18 – Julie London, American singer and actress (born 1926).
- 25 – Jeanne Lee, American singer, poet, and composer (born 1939).
- 30 – Steve Allen, American singer, songwriter, and television personality (born 1921).

November

- 4 – Vernel Fournier, American drummer (born 1928).
- 8 – Dick Morrissey, British saxophonist and composer (born 1908).

December

- 1
  - George Finola, American cornetist (born 1945).
  - Neal Creque, American organist and composer (born 1940).
- 8 – Al Timothy, Trinidadian jazz and calypso musician (born 1915).
- 12 – Rosa King, American saxophonist and singer (born 1939).

== 2001 ==
=== Album releases ===
- Michael Brecker: Nearness Of You: The Ballad Book (Verve)
- Diana Krall: The Look of Love (Verve)
- Gordon Goodwin's Big Phat Band: Swingin' For The Fences (Silverline)
- Herbie Hancock: Future 2 Future (Transparent, Columbia)
- Gordon Haskell: Look Out (Flying Sparks)
- The Idea of North: The Sum of Us (Magnetic Records)
- Robbie Williams: Swing When You're Winning (Capitol)
- James Morrison: Scream Machine (Morrison Records)
- World Saxophone Quartet: 25th Anniversary: The New Chapter (Justin Time)
- Marilyn Crispell: Blue (Black Saint)
- Matthew Shipp: Expansion Power Release (hatOLOGY)
- Olga Konkova Trio: Some Things From Home (Candid)

=== Deaths ===
- Moses Taiwa Molelekwa (17 April 1973 – 13 February), South African pianist
- John Lewis (May 3, 1920 – March 29), American pianist, composer and arranger

== 2002 ==
=== Events ===
January

- 25 – The 5th Polarjazz started in Longyearbyen, Svalbard (January 25 – 27).

March

- 22 – The 29th Vossajazz started in Vossavangen, Norway (March 22 – 24).

May

- 5 – The 13th MaiJazz started in Stavanger, Norway (May 6 – 10).
- 17 – The 30th Moers Festival started in Moers, Germany (May 17 – 20).
- 24 – The 30th Nattjazz started in Bergen, Norway (May 24 – June 1).

June

- 24 – The 12th Jazz Fest Wien started in Wien, Austria (June 24 – July 7).
- 27 – The 23rd Montreal International Jazz Festival started in Montreal, Quebec, Canada (June 27 – July 7).

July

- 3 – The 38th Kongsberg Jazzfestival started in Kongsberg, Norway (July 3 – 6).
- 5 – The 36th Montreux Jazz Festival started in Montreux, Switzerland (July 5 – 22).
- 12 – 27th North Sea Jazz Festival started in The Hague (July 12 – 14).
- 13 – 37th Pori Jazz started in Pori, Finland (July 13 – 21).
- 15 – The 42nd Moldejazz started in Molde, Norway (July 15 – 20).

August

- 5 – The 17th Oslo Jazzfestival started in Oslo, Norway (August 5 – 10).
- 7 – The 16th Sildajazz started in Haugesund, Norway (August 7 – 11).
- 9
  - The 48th Newport Jazz Festival started in Newport, Rhode Island (August 9 – 11).
  - The 19th Brecon Jazz Festival started in Brecon, Wales (August 9 – 11).

September

- 20 – The 45th Monterey Jazz Festival started in Monterey, California (September 20 – 22).

November

- 15 – The 11th London Jazz Festival started in London, England (November 15 – 24).

=== Album releases ===
- Norah Jones: Come Away with Me
- Rova Saxophone Quartet: Freedom in Fragments (composed by Fred Frith)
- Herbie Hancock: Directions in Music: Live at Massey Hall, live album with Michael Brecker and Roy Hargrove
- Gordon Haskell: Harry's Bar
- Kenny Garrett: Happy People
- James Morrison: So Far So Good
- Wayne Shorter: Footprints Live!
- World Saxophone Quartet: Steppenwolf (Justin Time)
- Fred Frith and Maybe Monday: Digital Wildlife (Winter & Winter)
- Kausland/Mathisen Quartet: Good Bait (Hot Club)
- Hugh Masekela: Time (Sony Music Distribution)

=== Deaths ===
January

- 21 – Peggy Lee, American singer, songwriter, composer, and actress (born 1920).

February

- 1 – Streamline Ewing, American trombonist (born 1917).
- 2 – Remo Palmier, American guitarist (born 1923).
- 6 – Wendell Marshall, American upright bassist (born 1920).
- 8 – Nick Brignola, American baritone saxophonist (born 1936).
- 10 – Dave Van Ronk, American folk singer (born 1936).
- 22 – Ronnie Verrell, English drummer (born 1926).
- 24 – Mel Stewart, American character actor, television director, and saxophonist (born 1929).
- 28 – Helmut Zacharias, German violinist and composer (born 1920).

March

- 10 – Shirley Scott, African-American organist (born 1934).
- 19 – John Patton, American pianist and organist (born 1935).
- 27 – Dudley Moore, English actor, comedian, pianist, and composer (born 1935).

April

- 8 – Wilber Morris, American upright bassist and bandleader (born 1937).
- 9 – Weldon Irvine, American composer, playwright, poet, pianist, organist, and keyboardist (born 1943).
- 11 – Bubba Brooks, American tenor saxophonist (born 1922).
- 16 – Claudio Slon, Brazilian drummer (born 1943).
- 18 – Cy Laurie, English clarinetist and bandleader (born 1926).
- 29
  - Noel DaCosta, Nigerian-Jamaican composer, violinist, and choral conductor (born 1929).
  - Pete Jacobsen, English pianist (born 1950).

May

- 6 – Bjørn Johansen, Norwegian saxophonist (born 1940).
- 12 – Bob Berg, American saxophonist (born 1951).
- 24 – Susie Garrett, African-American actress, vocalist, and acting teacher (born 1929).

June

- 5
  - Curtis Amy, American tenor saxophonist (born 1929).
  - Truck Parham, American upright bassist (born 1911).
- 27
  - Russ Freeman, American pianist and composer (born 1926).
  - Chico O'Farrill, Cuban composer, arranger, and conductor (born 1921).

July

- 2 – Ray Brown, American upright bassist (born 1926).
- 20 – Jimmy Maxwell, American trumpeter (born 1917).
- 22 – Marion Montgomery, American singer (born 1934).
- 25 – Idrees Sulieman, American trumpeter and alto saxophonist (born 1923).

August

- 2 – Roy Kral, American pianist and vocalist (born 1921).
- 31 – Lionel Hampton, American vibraphonist (born 1908).

September

- 5 – Frank Hewitt, American hard bop pianist (born 1935).
- 17 – Dodo Marmarosa, American pianist, composer, and arranger (born 1925).
- 21 – Peter Kowald, German upright bassist and tubist (born 1944).
- 30 – Ellis Larkins, American pianist (born 1923).

October

- 17
  - Chuck Domanico, American bassist (born 1944).
  - Henri Renaud, French jazz pianist and record company executive (born 1925).

November

- 3 – Lonnie Donegan, Scottish skiffle singer, songwriter, and guitarist (born 1931).
- 13
  - Bill Berry, American trumpeter, Duke Ellington Orchestra (born 1930).
  - Roland Hanna, American pianist, composer, and teacher (born 1932).
- 16 – Mose Vinson, American pianist and singer (born 1917).
- 20 – Webster Lewis, American keyboardist (born 1943).
- 21 – Hadda Brooks, American pianist, vocalist, and composer (born 1916).
- 27
  - John McLevy, Scottish trumpeter (born 1927).
  - Stanley Black, English bandleader, composer, conductor, arranger and pianist (born 1913).

December

- 2 – Mal Waldron, American pianist, composer, and arranger (born 1925).
- 5 – Arvell Shaw, American upright bassist (born 1923).
- 7 – Clare Deniz, British pianist (born 1911).
- 11 – Lou Stein, American pianist (born 1922).
- 13 – Stella Brooks, American singer (born 1910).

== 2003 ==
=== Album releases ===
- Michael Brecker: Wide Angles
- Michael Franks: Watching the Snow
- Kenny Garrett: Standard of Language
- Gordon Goodwin's Big Phat Band: XXL
- The Idea of North: Here & Now
- James Morrison: On The Edge (with Simon Stockhausen)
- Mike Nock: Changing Seasons with Brett Hirst and Toby Hall
- The Rippingtons: Let It Ripp
- Wayne Shorter: Alegria
- Amy Winehouse: Frank
- Tord Gustavsen Trio: Changing Places (ECM)

=== Deaths ===
- Nina Simone (February 21, 1933 – April 21), American singer

== 2004 ==
=== Album releases ===
- Jamie Cullum: Twentysomething
- Fourplay: Journey
- The Idea of North: Evidence
- Norah Jones: Feels Like Home
- Diana Krall: The Girl in the Other Room
- Mike Nock: Duologue (Birdland, 2004) live concert recording with Dave Liebman
- Ben Sidran: Nick's Bump
- World Saxophone Quartet: Experience (Justin Time)
- Gordon Haskell: The Lady Wants To Know

=== Deaths ===
- Ray Charles (September 23, 1930 – June 10), American singer, pianist and composer
- Bjørnar Andresen (April 1, 1945 – October 2), Norwegian upright bassist
- Artie Shaw (May 23, 1910 – December 30), American clarinetist

== 2005 ==
=== Album releases ===
- Herbie Hancock: Possibilities
- Diana Krall: Christmas Songs
- James Morrison: Gospel Collection
- The Rippingtons: Wild Card
- Wayne Shorter: Beyond the Sound Barrier
- Tord Gustavsen Trio: The Ground (ECM)
- Hans Mathisen: Quiet Songs (Curling Legs)

=== Deaths ===
- Pierre Michelot (March 3, 1928 – July 3), French upright-bassist

== 2006 ==
=== Album releases ===
- Eddie Daniels: Brief Encounter (Muse, 2006)
- Michael Franks: Rendezvous in Rio
- Gordon Goodwin's Big Phat Band: The Phat Pack
- The Idea of North: The Gospel Project
- Diana Krall: From This Moment On
- James Morrison: Gospel Collection Volume II
- James Morrison: 2x2 with Joe Chindamo
- The Rippingtons: 20th Anniversary
- World Saxophone Quartet: Political Blues (Justin Time)
- Olga Konkova and Per Mathisen: Unbound (Alessa)

=== Deaths ===
- Lou Rawls (December 1, 1933 – January 6), American singer
- Maynard Ferguson (May 4, 1928 – August 23), American trumpet player, composer
- Ruth Brown (January 12, 1928 – November 17), American singer, actress
- Anita O'Day (October 18, 1919 – November 23), American singer
- Jay McShann (January 12, 1916 – December 7), American pianist
- Kenneth Sivertsen (January 16, 1961 – December 24), Norwegian guitarist, composer, and entertainer

=== Births ===
- Angelina Jordan (January 10), Norwegian singer.

== 2007 ==
=== Album releases ===
- Michael Brecker: Pilgrimage
- Herbie Hancock: River: The Joni Letters
- The Idea of North: Live at the Powerhouse (CD and DVD)
- James Morrison: The Other Woman with Deni Hines
- James Morrison: Christmas
- Tord Gustavsen Trio: Being There (ECM)

=== Deaths ===
- Michael Brecker (March 29, 1949 – January 13), American tenor saxophonist, composer
- Al Viola (June 16, 1919 – February 21), American guitarist
- Art Davis (December 5, 1934 – July 29), American upright-bassist
- Max Roach (January 10, 1924 – August 16), American drummer, percussionist, and composer
- Joe Zawinul (July 7, 1932 – September 11), Austrian keyboardist and composer
- Specs Powell (June 5, 1922 – September 15), American drummer and percussionist
- Teresa Brewer (May 7, 1931 – October 17), American singer
- Joel Dorn (April 7, 1942 – December 17), American music producer and record label entrepreneur
- Oscar Peterson (August 15, 1925 – December 23), Canadian pianist

== 2008 ==
=== Album releases ===
- Gordon Goodwin's Big Phat Band: Act Your Age
- Steve Tyrell: Back to Bacharach

=== Deaths ===
- Esbjörn Svensson (April 16, 1964 – June 14), Swedish pianist and bandleader of Esbjörn Svensson Trio
- Cachao (September 14, 1918 – March 22), Cuban upright-bassist
- Earle Hagen (July 9, 1919 – May 26), American composer
- LeRoi Moore (September 7, 1961 – August 19), American saxophonist
- Bheki Mseleku (March 3, 1955 – September 9), South African pianist
- Richard Wright (July 28, 1943 – September 15), English keyboarder, composer, singer and songwriter
- Merl Saunders (February 14, 1934 – October 24), American pianist and keyboardist
- Miriam Makeba (March 4, 1932 – November 9), South African singer

== 2009 ==
=== Album releases ===
- Diana Krall: Quiet Nights
- The Rippingtons: Modern Art
- Ben Sidran: Dylan Different
- Tord Gustavsen Ensemble: Restored, Returned (ECM)
- Olga Konkova: Improvisational Four (Candid)

=== Deaths ===
- David "Fathead" Newman (February 24, 1933 – January 20), American saxophonist
- Gerry Niewood (April 6, 1943 – February 12), American saxophonist
- Blossom Dearie (April 28, 1924 – February 7), American singer and pianist
- Coleman Mellett (May 27, 1974 – February 12), American guitarist
- Koko Taylor (September 28, 1928 – June 3), American singer
- Kenny Rankin (February 10, 1940 – June 7), American singer and composer
- Tina Marsh (January 18, 1954 – June 16), American singer and composer

== See also ==
- List of years in jazz
- 2000 in music
