= Ken Rattenbury =

- Born: Kenneth Miller Rattenbury; 10 September 1920
- Origin: Spilsby, Lincolnshire, England
- Died: 9 April 2001 (aged 80)
- Genres: Jazz
- Instruments: trumpet piano

Ken Rattenbury (10 September 1920 – 9 April 2001) was an English jazz trumpeter, pianist and composer and author.

== Early life ==
Rattenbury was born in Spilsby, Lincolnshire to Sidney, a postmaster and Maude (nee Miller), a housewife. He would go on to serve in the British Army from 1940 to 1946. He received a World War II Victory Medal, Defence Medal, and the British Expeditionary Forces medal.

== Jazz career ==
He first joined a jazz band playing the piano in 1933. While in the army, he took up the trumpet and toured the European Theatre of World War II leading his own band. In 1946 he had a stint with Stars in Battledress, and after being demobilised lived in the English Midlands. He mostly did freelancing until he formed his own band in 1951. He wrote an extended jazz suite in honour of Bix Beiderbecke, called Mirror to Bix, and had George Chisholm and Steve Race in his group. During 1963 and 1964, he composed and broadcast two thirty-minute jazz suites, The Seven Ages of Man and The Rime of the Ancient Mariner, and again had some of the greats of jazz play with him, Kenny Baker and had Michael Hordern reciting the famous Shakespearean soliloquy, "All the world's a stage ..." in the Seven Ages suite. He then worked for EMI to produce full-length albums of incidental music to stories by Hans Christian Andersen and The Brothers Grimm. He then established the Jazz Four.

He got his M.A. from University of Keele in 1984. Rattenbury is most notable for his Duke Ellington biography, but also had been commissioned by the BBC in the 1960s to compose two half-hour jazz suites titled The Seven Ages of Man and The Rime Of The Ancient Mariner.

== Personal life ==
He married Elsie May Cross on 8 May 1941. He appeared on BBC Light Programme on Friday nights. With Ted Heath in the early 1960s he wrote and performed 30 minute jazz soliloquies.

== Works ==
- Duke Ellington, Jazz Composer Yale University Press, 1990; ISBN 0-300-04428-3
- Jazz Journey 1925-94, 1995; autobiography

== Notes ==
Bibliography

- Contemporary Authors Online, Detroit: Gale, 2002, ISBN 978-0-7876-3995-2
