= Billy Usselton =

American jazz musician

- Birth name: William Usselton
- Born: July 2, 1926; New Castle, Pennsylvania, U.S.
- Died: September 5, 1994 (aged 68); Tempe, Arizona, U.S.
- Genres: Jazz
- Instruments: Clarinet, tenor saxophone, oboe

William "Billy" Usselton (July 2, 1926 – September 5, 1994) was an American jazz reed player.

== Early life ==
Usselton was born in New Castle, Pennsylvania. Proficient on tenor saxophone, clarinet, and oboe, he began playing professionally in high school with Bubbles Becker. Although his parents wanted him to attend college in Pennsylvania, he wanted to play for a living.

== Career ==
Usselton then played with Sonny Dunham in the 1940s before joining Ray Anthony in 1948–1949 and again in 1951–1952. In the interim, he joined Tommy Dorsey's band and recommended Mel Lewis after Buddy Rich was fired. After his second stint with Anthony, he played with Bill Harris in Florida.

In 1954 Usselton joined Les Brown's band, and played with him for decades. Usselton plays on nearly all of Brown's records released on Coral Records and Capitol Records, and toured with him worldwide as part of Bob Hope's United Service Organizations Tours. Usselton's only album as a leader was the 1957 release His First Album, issued on Kapp Records.

== Personal life ==
He married Lauri Johnson, a vocalist in Brown's ensemble, in 1958. Billy and family lived in Chicago in the 1960s where he gigged and was a jazz clinician for the Conn Corporation. The Usselton family moved to Phoenix, Arizona, in 1977. Usselton died in Tempe, Arizona, in September 1994.
