= Morrison Records (Australia) =

Morrison Records is an independent Australian jazz record label that is co-owned and run by James Morrison, his brother John Morrison and friend David Green. Artists currently on the label include James himself, his brother John's Swing City big band and renowned vocalist Emma Pask.

== See also ==
- List of record labels
