= 2022 in jazz =

- Decade: 2020s in jazz
- Music: 2022 in music
- Standards: List of jazz standards
- See also: 2021 in jazz – 2023 in jazz

This is a timeline documenting events of jazz in the year 2022.

== Events ==
=== April ===
- April 3 - The 64th Annual Grammy Awards occur.
- April 29 - After being cancelled in 2020 and 2021 due to COVID-19, JazzFest reopens
- April 29 - Domi and JD Beck sign a contract with Anderson .Paak's label APESHIT in partnership with Blue Note Records and release their debut single "SMiLE"
- April 30 - International Jazz Day occurs with a concert at the United Nations directed by Herbie Hancock

=== May ===
- May 26 - Subgenre MUMBLE JAZZ is invented with Unc D's single HPHCPH.MMBL. MUMBLE JAZZ mixes jazz scatting with autotune modern hip hop flow.

=== June ===
- June 1 - Sons of Kemet announced the band would be dispanding after their final live tours this year, making Black To The Future from 2021 their final studio album

=== July ===
- July 26 - Geri Allen is inducted into the DownBeat hall of fame
- July 29 - July 31 - The 2022 Blue Note Jazz Festival occurs hosted by Dave Chappelle.

=== August ===
- Jon Batiste wins top Jazz Artist in the 70th Annual DownBeat critics poll, Charles Lloyd & The Marvels wins top Jazz group

=== September ===
- The 65th Monterey Jazz Festival Occurs

=== October ===
- October 1 to November 12 - Snarky Puppy set to go on tour in Europe to support their September 30 Album Empire Central
- October 6 to November 12 - French Kiwi Juice set to go on a North American tour
- October 10 - Domi and JD Beck start their first ever live tour in their hometown of Dallas, Texas and quickly sell out
- October 20 - Fergus McCreadie wins the Scottish Album of the Year Award for his album Forest Floor
- October 21 - Finding The Right Notes, a PBS documentary about the life of Ron Carter, releases
- October 28 - Black And Blues, a documentary about the life of Louis Armstrong, releases

=== November ===
- November 30 - The New York Times ranks Cécile McLorin Salvant's Ghost Song as the best jazz album of 2022, followed by Immanuel Wilkins' The 7th Hand in #2

=== December ===
- December 21 - NPR Music ranks Domi and JD Beck's NOT TiGHT in the top 10 albums of 2022 at No. 10
- December 30 - The Guardian ranks Charles Lloyd's Trios: Sacred Thread as the best jazz album of 2022, followed by Mary Halvorson's Amaryllis/Belladonna (treated as one album) in #2
- December 30 - Jazzmeia Horn and Her Noble Force's 2021 album Dear Love ends off the year at the #1 spot with most radio airplay of the year as documented by JazzWeek.

== Albums ==
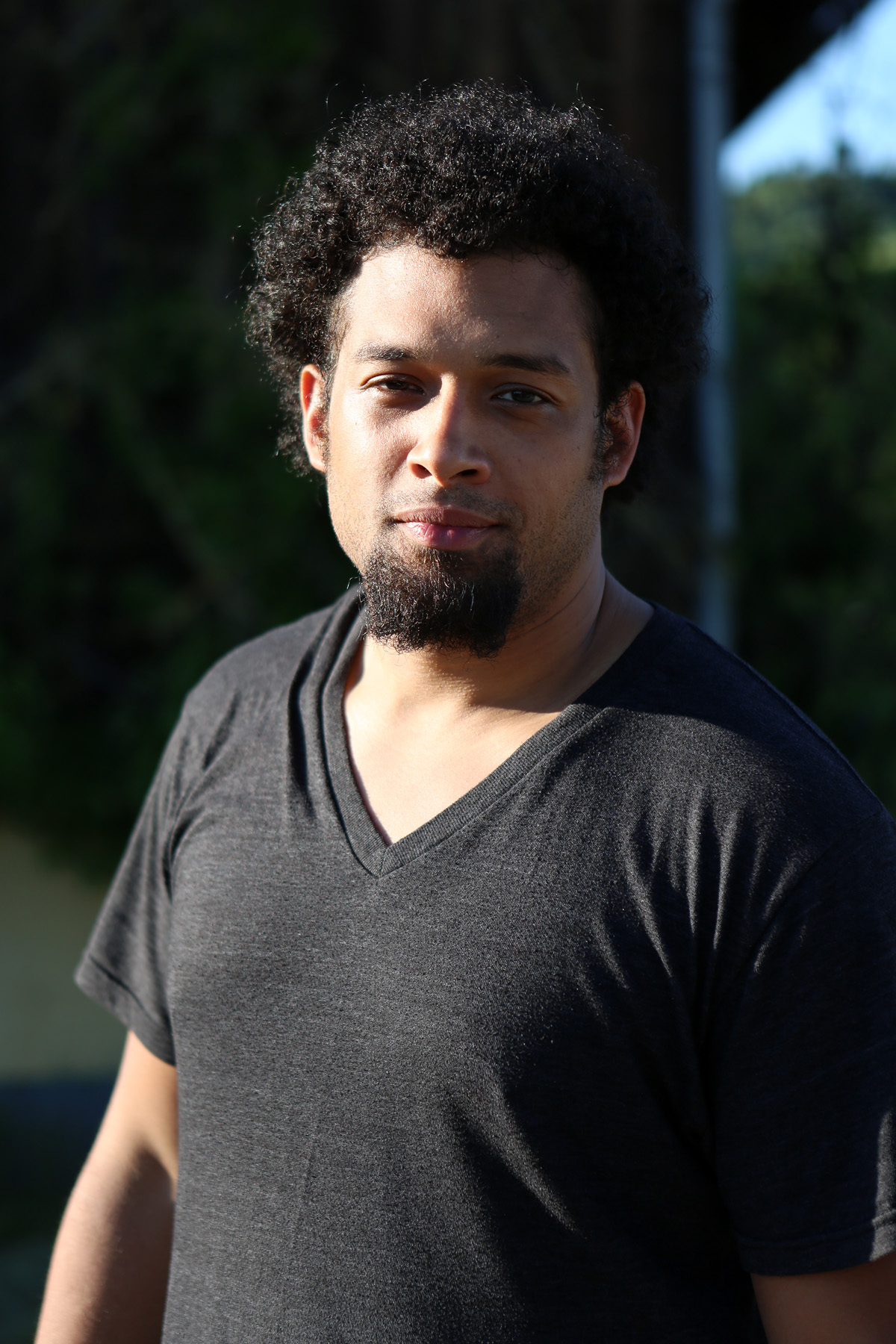
Makaya McCraven, who released In These Times, one of the most acclaimed albums of 2022. Photo taken in 2013

Month	Day	Album	Artist	Label	Notes	Ref.
January	21	Flow of Everything	Michael Bisio & Matthew Shipp	Fundacja Słuchaj		
January	21	2 Blues for Cecil	Andrew Cyrille, William Parker, Enrico Rava	TUM Records		
January	28	The 7th Hand	Immanuel Wilkins	Blue Note Records		
February	4	Father's Wing	Rob Mazurek Quartet	Rogueart		
February	25	Feed The Machine	Binker and Moses	Gearbox Records		
March	4	Ghost Song	Cécile McLorin Salvant	Nonesuch Records		
March	4	Pray For Me, I Don't Fit In	Melt Yourself Down	Universal International Music		
March	8	Four Brothers	Tony Monaco	Chicken Coup Records		
March	11	Live at GroundUP Music Festival	Snarky Puppy	GroundUP Music		
April	1	GOLD	Alabaster DePlume	International Anthem Recording Company		
April	4	Forest Floor	Fergus McCreadie	Edition Records		
April	15	Pursuit of Ends	High Pulp	ANTI-records		
May	6	John Scofield	John Scofield	ECM Records		
May	13	Amaryllis	Mary Halvorson	Nonesuch Records		
May	13	Belladonna	Mary Halvorson	Nonesuch Records		
May	13	Red Balloon	Tank and the Bangas	Verve Forecast		
May	20	Origin	Joey Alexander	Mack Avenue Records		
May	27	In The Spirit Of Ntu	Nduduzo Makhathini	Blue Note Records		
May	27	Bluesthetic	Steve Davis	Smoke Sessions Records		
June	10	Vincent	French Kiwi Juice	Mom + Pop Music		
June	15	Holding Space, Live In Berlin	Lizz Wright	Blues & Greens Records		
June	17	Pink Dolphins	Anteloper	International Anthem Recording Company		
June	17	Golden Hour	Jocelyn Gould			
July	1	Jazz Codes	Moor Mother	Anti- Records		
July	15	Elastic Wave	Gard Nilssen Acoustic Unity, André Roligheten, Petter Eldh	ECM Records		
July	29	Not Tight	Domi and JD Beck	Blue Note Records		
August	26	Everything I Know About Love	Laufey	AWAL		
September	9	LongGone	Joshua Redman, Christian McBride, Brian Blade	Nonesuch Records		
September	16	Linger Awhile	Samara Joy	Verve Records		
September	16	View with a Room	Julian Lage	Blue Note Records		
September	23	Hyper-Dimensional Expansion Beam	The Comet Is Coming	Impulse Records		
September	23	In These Times	Makaya McCraven	International Anthem, Nonesuch, XL		
September	23	Weather Alive	Beth Orton	Partisan Records		
September	23	Secrets of Inanna	Connie Han	Mack Avenue Records	Quintet with Bill Wysaske (drums), John Patitucci (bass, acoustic), Rich Perry (tenor sax), Katisse Buckingham (flute)	
September	23	Sparkle Beings	Angelica Sanchez Trio	Sunnyside Records		
September	30	Empire Central	Snarky Puppy	GroundUP Music		
October	21	Nikki by Starlight	Nikki Yanofsky	MNRK Music Group		
November	4	Voices of Bishara	Tom Skinner	Nonesuch; International Anthem; Brownswood		
November	4	Where I'm Meant to Be	Ezra Collective	Partisan Records		
November	11	KALAK	Sarathy Korwar	The Leaf Label	Produced by Photay	
November	18	Trios: Sacred Thread	Charles Lloyd	Blue Note Records		

== Awards ==
=== Grammy Awards ===
The 64th Annual Grammy Awards were held on April 3, 2022, honoring the best recordings, compositions, and artists from September 1, 2020, to September 30, 2021, as chosen by the members of the Recording Academy.

Best Improvised Jazz Solo

- "Humpty Dumpty (Set 2)" – Chick Corea
- "Sackodougou" – Christian Scott aTunde Adjuah
- "Kick Those Feet" – Kenny Barron
- "Bigger Than Us" – Jon Batiste
- "Absence" – Terence Blanchard

Best Jazz Vocal Album

- Songwrights Apothecary Lab – Esperanza Spalding
- Generations – The Baylor Project
- SuperBlue – Kurt Elling and Charlie Hunter
- Time Traveler – Nnenna Freelon
- Flor – Gretchen Parlato

Best Jazz Instrumental Album

- Skyline – Ron Carter, Jack DeJohnette and Gonzalo Rubalcaba
- Jazz Selections: Music from and Inspired by Soul – Jon Batiste
- Absence – Terence Blanchard featuring the E Collective and the Turtle Island Quartet
- Akoustic Band Live – Chick Corea, John Patitucci and Dave Weckl
- Side-Eye NYC (V1.IV) – Pat Metheny

Best Large Jazz Ensemble Album

- For Jimmy, Wes and Oliver – Christian McBride Big Band
- Live at Birdland! – The Count Basie Orchestra directed by Scotty Barnhart
- Dear Love – Jazzmeia Horn and her Noble Force
- Swirling – Sun Ra Arkestra
- Jackets XL – Yellowjackets + WDR Big Band

Best Latin Jazz Album

- Mirror Mirror – Eliane Elias with Chick Corea and Chucho Valdés
- The South Bronx Story – Carlos Henriquez
- Virtual Birdland – Arturo O'Farrill and the Afro Latin Jazz Orchestra
- Transparency – Dafnis Prieto Sextet
- El Arte del Bolero – Miguel Zenón and Luis Perdomo

== All critically reviewed albums ranked ==
=== Metacritic ===
Number	Artist	Album	Average score	Number of reviews	Reference
1	Binker And Moses	Feeding The Machine	89	8 reviews	
2	Joshua Redman, Christian McBride, Brian Blade	LongGone	88	4 reviews	
3	Makaya McCraven	In These Times	87	11 reviews	
4	Sarathy Korwar	KALAK	87	6 reviews	
5	Immanuel Wilkins	The 7th Hand	87	4 reviews	
6	Cécile McLorin Salvant	Ghost Song	87	4 reviews	
7	Mary Halvorson	Belladonna	86	6 reviews	
8	Jeff Parker	Mondays at the Enfield Tennis Academy	85	5 reviews	
9	Brian Jackson	This Is Brian Jackson	85	4 reviews	
10	The Revelators	Revelators Sound System	85	5 reviews	
11	Ezra Collective	Where I'm Meant to Be	84	8 reviews	
12	Flora Purim	If You Will	84	5 reviews	
13	Charles Lloyd	Trios: Ocean	84	4 reviews	
14	Keith Jarrett	Bordeaux Concert	84	4 reviews	
15	Melt Yourself Down	Pray for Me I Don't Fit In	83	5 reviews	
16	The Comet Is Coming	Hyper-Dimensional Expansion Beam	82	8 reviews	
17	Laufey	Everything I Know About Love	82	4 reviews	
18	Mary Halvorson	Amaryllis	82	6 reviews	
19	Oren Ambarchi	Shebang	82	6 reviews	
20	DOMi & JD BECK	NOT TiGHT	82	5 reviews	
21	Bruce Hornsby	'Flicted	82	5 reviews	
22	The Bad Plus	The Bad Plus	82	4 reviews	
23	Alabaster DePlume	Gold	81	6 reviews	
24	Anteloper	Pink Dolphins	81	6 reviews	
25	Tyshawn Sorey	Mesmerism	81	4 reviews	
26	Sun Ra Arkestra	Living Sky	80	7 reviews	
27	Charles Lloyd	Trios: Sacred Thread	80	4 reviews	
28	Ben Marc	Glass Effect	79	5 reviews	
29	Bill Frisell	Four	79	4 reviews	

=== AnyDecentMusic ===
Number	Artist	Album	Average score	Number of reviews	Reference
1	Binker And Moses	Feeding The Machine	8.3	6 reviews	
2	Sarathy Korwar	KALAK	8.0	5 reviews	
3	Makaya McCraven	In These Times	7.9	7 reviews	
4	Ezra Collective	Where I'm Meant to Be	7.8	9 reviews	
5	Melt Yourself Down	Pray For Me I Don't Fit In	7.8	5 reviews	
6	The Comet Is Coming	Hyper-Dimensional Expansion Beam	7.5	10 reviews	
7	Kokoroko	Could We Be More	7.1	8 reviews	

== Deaths ==
=== January ===
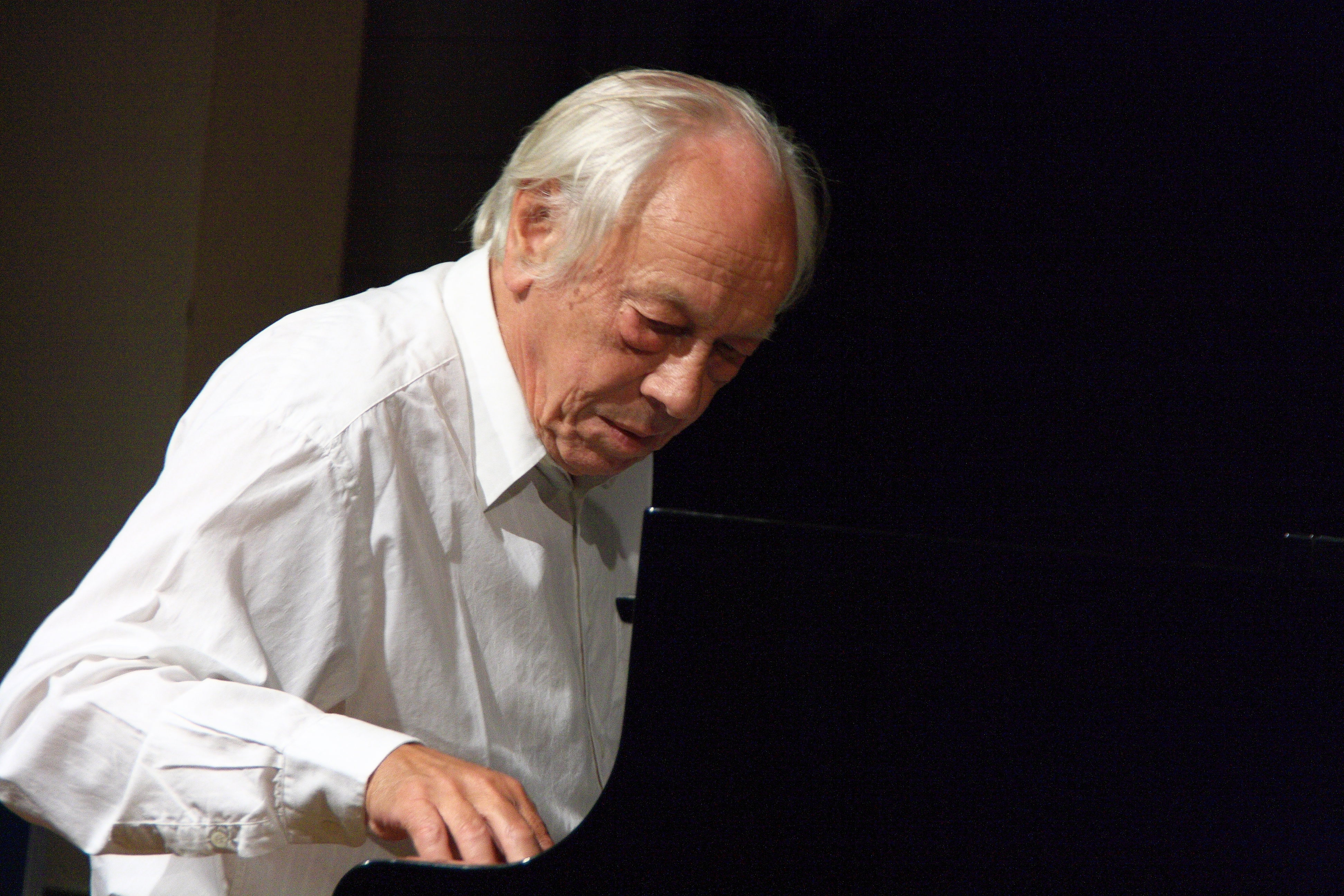
Fred Van Hove, who died January 13

- January 13 – Fred Van Hove, 84, Belgian jazz musician

=== February ===
- February 21 – Ernie Andrews, Jazz and R&B singer

=== March ===
- March 8 - Ron Miles, 58, jazz trumpeter, cornetist, and composer

=== June ===
- June 3 – Grachan Moncur III, 85, American jazz musician
- June 14 – Meghan Stabile, 39, American jazz producer/marketer

=== July ===
- July 9 – Barbara Thompson, 77, British jazz saxophonist, flautist and composer
- July 19 – Michael Henderson, 71, American jazz fusion bassist
- July 25 – Milenko Stefanović, 92, Serbian classical and jazz clarinetist

=== August ===
- August 9 – Della Griffin, 100, American jazz vocalist and drummer
- August 10 – Abdul Wadud, 75, American jazz cellist
- August 18 – Rolf Kühn, 92, German jazz clarinetist and saxophonist
- August 22 – Fredy Studer, 74, Swiss percussionist
- August 22 – Jaimie Branch, 39, American jazz trumpeter
- August 25 - Joey DeFrancesco, 51, Jazz Organist and Multi Instrumentalist

=== September ===
- September 12 - Ramsey Lewis, 87, Jazz pianist, composer, and radio personality
- September 24 - Pharoah Sanders, 81, Tenor Saxophonist

=== October ===
- October 30 - Anthony Ortega, 94, clarinetist, saxophonist, and flautist.

=== November ===
- November 16 - Mick Goodrick, 77, jazz guitarist and music teacher

== See also ==
- Lists of 2022 albums
- List of jazz festivals
- List of years in jazz
- 2022 in music
