= 2023 in jazz =

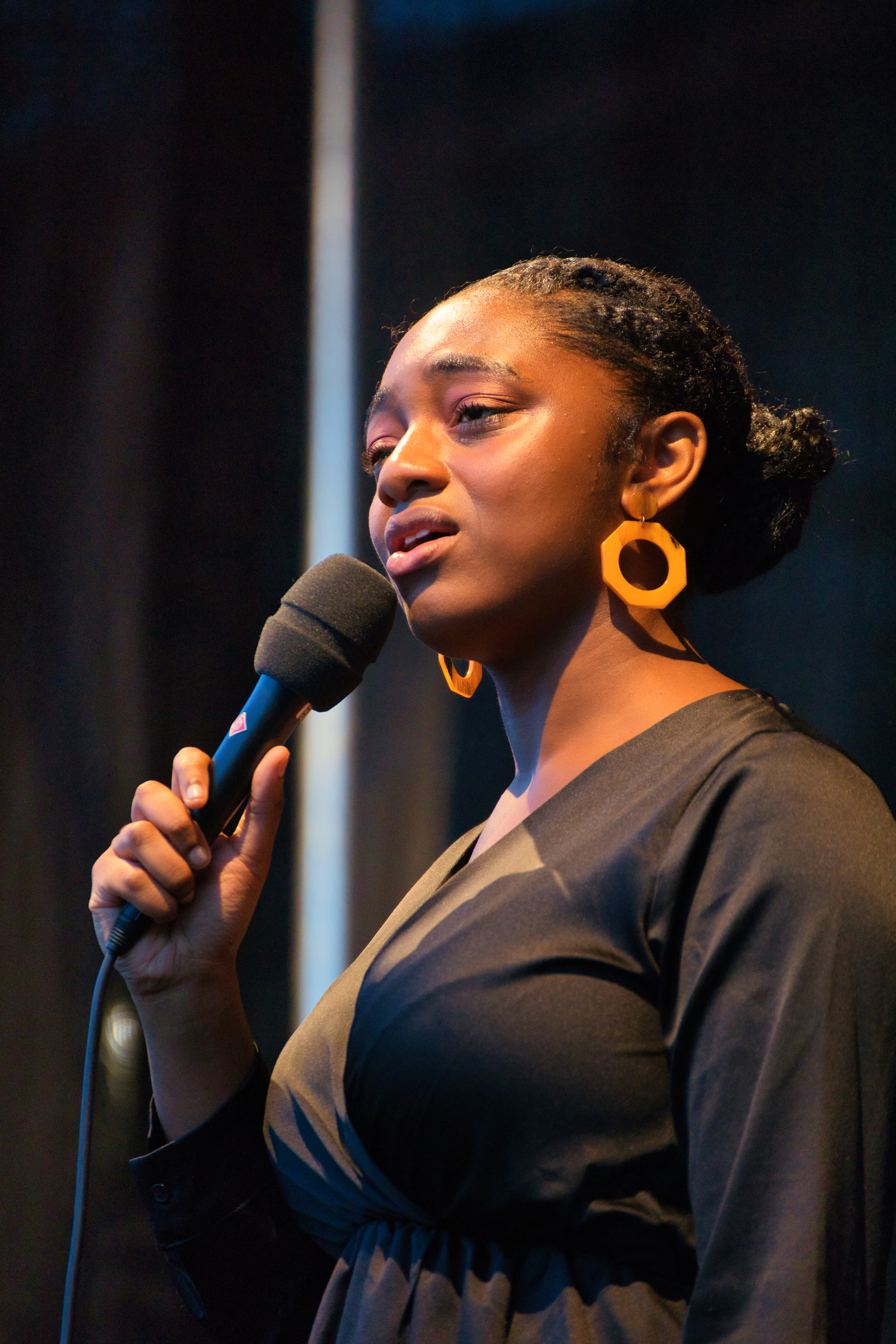
- Samara Joy, who won Best New Artist in the 2023 Grammy Awards
- Decade: 2020s in jazz
- Music: 2023 in music
- Standards: List of jazz standards
- See also: 2022 in jazz – 2024 in jazz

This is a timeline documenting events of jazz in the year 2023.

== Events ==
=== February ===
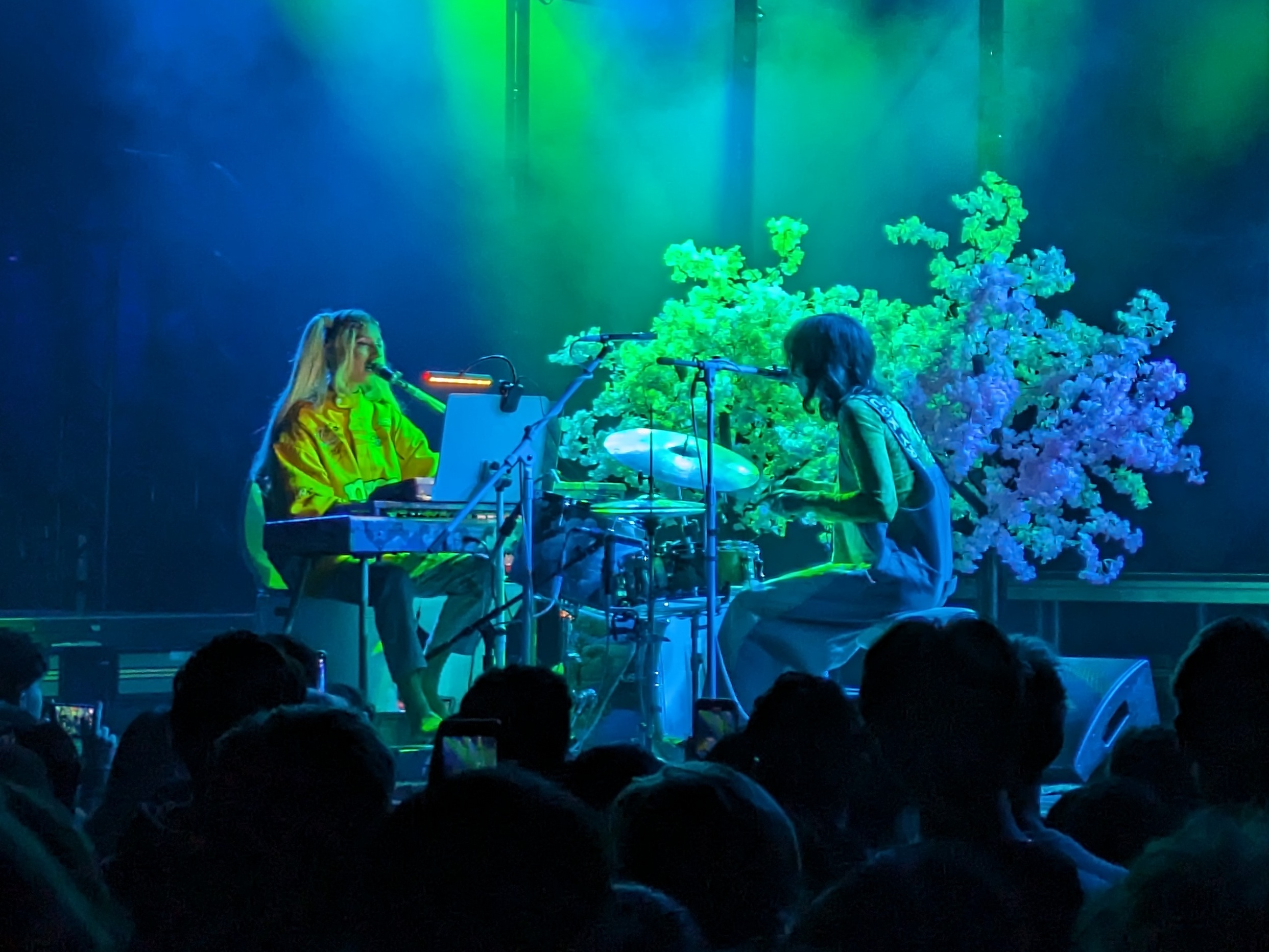
Domi and JD Beck performing at History in Toronto, Canada

- February 5 – At the 65th Annual Grammy Awards, winners include Wayne Shorter, Samara Joy, and Arturo O'Farrill. Snarky Puppy wins best contemporary instrumental album for their 2022 album Empire Central, Samara Joy wins best Vocal Jazz album for her 2022 album Linger Awhile. Terri Lyne Carrington, Kris Davis, Linda May Han Oh, Nicholas Payton & Matthew Stevens win Best Jazz Instrumental Album for their album New Standards Volume 1.

=== April ===
- April 14 – First day of Coachella 2023, a two weekend event, occurs. Jazz musicians in attendance are The Comet is Coming and Domi and JD Beck
- April 15 – After 8 years, British band GoGo Penguin's contract with Blue Note Records ends, and the band switches to XXIM Records, a record label more typically associated with neoclassical music and progressive electronic music.

=== May ===
- May 17 – The Jazz Journalists Association Jazz Awards are presented. Charles Lloyd wins Lifetime Achievement in Jazz award. Drummer Terri Lyne Carrington wins Musician of The Year. Singer Samara Joy wins Up & Coming Musician of the Year and Female Vocalist of the Year. Ashley Kahn wins Lifetime Achievement in Jazz Journalism award.
- May 19 – Lionel Loueke and Gretchen Parlato released their collaborative album Lean In.
- May 31 – The tapes for a long lost, unreleased John Coltrane live album with Eric Dolphy are found at the New York Public Library for the Performing Arts.

=== June ===
- June 7 – The San Francisco Jazz Festival takes place in the United States. Jacob Collier and Samara Joy are in attendance.
- June 13 – The Grammys announce a new award category: Best Alternative Jazz Album
- June 21 – The 37th Annual Syracuse Jazz Fest takes place in the United States. Herbie Hancock and Gladys Knight are in attendance
- June 30 – The 36th annual Saskatchewan Jazz Festival kicked off in Saskatoon, Saskatchewan.

=== July ===
- July 7 – The 56th Pori Jazz Festival is scheduled to take place in Finland.
- July 28 – The Blue Note Jazz Festival opens in Napa, California, hosted by Dave Chappelle and headlined by Mary Blige, Chance The Rapper and Nas. Robert Glasper is the artist in residence. Notable attendees include George Clinton, Anderson .Paak, Domi and JD Beck

=== August ===
- August 4 – The Newport Jazz Festival opens in the United States. Notable attendees include Kamasi Washington, Domi and JD Beck, Immanuel Wilkins Quartet, Herbie Hancock, Samara Joy, Lakecia Benjamin and Thundercat
- August 25 - A 3 episode Amazon Prime biographical documentary miniseries about the life of Wayne Shorter through several decades releases, titled Wayne Shorter: Zero Gravity

=== September ===
- September 22 – The 65th Monterey Jazz Festival is scheduled to take place in the United States, with Lakecia Benjamin as the artist in residence. Notable attendees include Herbie Hancock, Snarky Puppy, Samara Joy, and Thundercat

=== October ===
- October 13 – Stockholm Jazz Festival took place in Sweden.

=== December ===
- December 5 - NPR Music ranks Meshell Ndegeocello's The Omnichord Real Book and Yussef Dayes's Black Classical Music among the 50 best albums of 2023.
- December 7 - The New York Times ranks Chief Xian aTunde Adjuah's Bark Out Thunder Roar Out Lightning as the best jazz album of 2023, followed by Jaimie Branch's Fly or Die Fly or Die Fly or Die ((World War)) in #2
- December 13 - Stereogum ranks Matana Roberts' Coin Coin Chapter 5: In The Garden as the best jazz album of 2023, followed by Jaimie Branch's Fly or Die Fly or Die Fly or Die ((World War)) in #2
- December 19 - NPR Music ranks Meshell Ndegeocello's The Omnichord Real Book as the best jazz album of 2023
- December 26 - The Guardian ranks Tyshawn Sorey's Continuing as the best jazz album of 2023
- December 31 - Ed Cherry's Are We There Yet? ends off the year with the most radio airplay as documented by JazzWeek

== Albums ==
Month	Day	Album	Artist	Label	Notes	Ref.
January	6	Alive at the Village Vanguard	Fred Hersch and Esperanza Spalding	Palmetto Records	Live album	
January	27	Portrait Of A Dog	Jonah Yano	Innovative Leisure		
January	27	Letters to George	George (Note: GEORGE is a quartet led by John Hollenbeck)	Out of Your Head		
January	27	Where You Wish You Were	Bill Laurance and Michael League	ACT		
January	27	Phoenix	Lakecia Benjamin	Whirlwind Recordings		
February	3	Dance Kobina	Joe Chambers	Blue Note Records		
February	3	Carmen Rhapsody	Aki Takase	BMC		
February	17	Transmissions From Total Refreshment Centre	Total Refreshment Centre	Blue Note Records		
February	17	Guilty Pleasures	Kurt Elling, Charlie Hunter, Nate Smith	Edition Records	EP	
February	17	Zurich Concert	Joëlle Léandre	Intakt Records	Live album	
February	17	By The Way	Theo Croker, Ego Ella May, D'LEAU	Sony Masterworks	EP	
February	24	Travel	The Necks	Northern Spy Records		
February	24	Prime	Christian McBride's New Jawn	Mack Avenue		
March	3	London Brew	London Brew	Concord Jazz		
March	3	Therapy	Brendan Eder Ensemble	No label		
March	10	Moving On Skiffle	Van Morrison	Virgin Music		
March	10	Jasmine on a Night in July	Scree	Ruination		
March	17	The Layers	Julian Lage	Blue Note Records	EP	
March	24	Requiem For Jazz	Angel Bat Dawid	International Anthem Recording Company		
March	24	Mélusine	Cécile McLorin Salvant	Nonesuch Records		
March	31	Lightning Dreamers	Rob Mazurek and the Exploding Star Orchestra	International Anthem Recording Company		
March	31	Fire Illuminations	Wadada Leo Smith	Kabell Records		
April	7	return to casual	Walter Smith III	Blue Note Records		
April	7	KAL (Real World)	Sarathy Korwar	The Leaf Label		
April	14	Echoes	The Fire! Orchestra	Rune Grammofon		
April	14	Variables	Alfa Mist	Anti- Records		
April	14	Everything Is Going To Be Okay	GoGo Penguin	XXIM Records		
April	14	Enigmatic Society	Dinner Party (Note: Dinner Party is a supergroup featuring pianist Robert Glasper, saxophonist Kamasi Washington, multi-instrumentalist Terrace Martin and producer 9th Wonder)	Sounds of Crenshaw, Empire Records		
April	14	Brand New Life	Brandee Younger	Impulse! Records		
April	21	All One	Ben Wendel	Edition Records		
April	21	Loyal Returns	David Cook	Sunnyside Records		
April	21	Stage & Screen	John Pizzarelli	Palmetto Records		
April	28	Always on my Mind	Rebekka Bakken	Sony Music		
April	28	Pieces of Treasure	Rickie Lee Jones	BMG		
April	28	Savoy	Taj Mahal	Stony Plain Records		
May	7	In Real Time	ARTEMIS	Blue Note Records		
May	12	Routes	Samuel Blaser	Enja Records/Yellowbird Records		
May	12	In Search Of A Better Tomorrow	Eabs Meets Jaubi	Astigmatic Records		
May	16	Oedipe Redux	Lucian Ban and Mat Maneri	Sunnyside Records		
May	19	Lean In	Gretchen Parlato and Lionel Loueke	Edition Records		
May	26	Animals	Kassa Overall	Warp Records		
May	26	The New Standard (Reissue)	Herbie Hancock			
May	26	Dance of the Mystic Bliss	Michael Blake and Chroma Nova	P&M		
May	26	The Sport Of Love	Asma Maroof, Patrick Belaga, Tapiwa Svosve	PAN Records		
June	2	Beloved! Paradise! Jazz?!	McKinley Dixon	City Slang	Jazz-rap	
June	9	When the Poems Do What They Do	Aja Monet	Drink Sum Wtr		
June	9	Rituals + Routines	Marquis Hill	Edition Records		
June	16	The Omnichord Real Book	Meshell Ndegeocello	Blue Note Records		
June	16	Dream Box	Pat Metheny	Modern Recordings		
June	16	Dolphin	Greg Foat / Gigi Masin	Strut Records		
June	16	A Time to Remember	Elina Duni	ECM Records		
June	16	I Want More	Donny McCaslin	Edition Records		
June	23	Sun Arcs	Blue Lake	Tonal Union		
June	30	Blowout	John Carroll Kirby	Stones Throw Records		
July	14	Connection	Ceramic Dog, Marc Ribot	Knockwurst Records		
July	28	Joni Mitchell At Newport	Joni Mitchell	Rhino Records		
August	25	Fly or Die Fly or Die Fly or Die	Jaimie Branch (Note: Recorded in 2022 and released Posthumously)	International Anthem Recording Company		
September	1	Diatom Ribbons Live at the Village Vanguard	Kris Davis	Pyroclastic Records		
September	7	Talàn	Raphael Rogiński	Instant Classic		
September	8	Come with Fierce Grace	Alabaster DePlume	International Anthem Recording Company		
September	8	Black Classical Music	Yussef Dayes	Brownswood Recordings / Nonesuch Records		
September	8	For Mahalia With Love	James Brandon Lewis Red Lily Quintet	Tao Forms		
September	15	Ex Machina	Steve Lehman and Orchestre National De Jazz	ONJ Records		
September	15	Where Are We	Joshua Redman	Blue Note Records		
September	15	The Intrinsic Nature of Shipp	Matthew Shipp	Mahakala		
September	22	Afro Futuristic Dreams	Idris Ackamoor & The Pyramids	Strut Records		
September	29	Coin Coin Chapter Five: In the Garden	Matana Roberts	Constellation Records		
September	29	FluXkit Vancouver (its suite but sacred)	Darius Jones	Saltern/Universal		
October	6	Next Door	Leo Takami	Unseen Worlds		
October	20	Shimmer Wince	Anna Webber	Intakt		
October	20	Vol. 1	Chris Botti	Blue Note Records, UMG		
November	17	New Blue Sun	André 3000	Epic Records, Sony Music		
November	17	The Near North Side	Calvin Keys & Terrace Martin	Sounds of Crenshaw, BMG		

== Awards ==
=== Grammy Awards ===
The 65th Annual Grammy Awards were held on February 5, 2023 honoring the best recordings, compositions, and artists from October 1, 2021, to September 30, 2022, as chosen by the members of the Recording Academy.

Best Improvised Jazz Solo

- "Endangered Species" – Wayne Shorter and Leo Genovese
- "Rounds (Live)" – Ambrose Akinmusire
- "Keep Holding On" – Gerald Albright
- "Falling" – Melissa Aldana
- "Call of the Drum" – Marcus Baylor
- "Cherokee/Koko" – John Beasley

Best Jazz Vocal Album

- Linger Awhile – Samara Joy
- The Evening: Live at Apparatus – The Baylor Project
- Fade to Black – Carmen Lundy
- Fifty – The Manhattan Transfer with The WDR Funkhausorchester
- Ghost Song – Cécile McLorin Salvant

Best Jazz Instrumental Album

- New Standards Vol. 1 – Terri Lyne Carrington, Kris Davis, Linda May Han Oh, Nicholas Payton and Matthew Stevens
- Live in Italy – Peter Erskine Trio
- LongGone – Joshua Redman, Brad Mehldau, Christian McBride, and Brian Blade
- Live at the Detroit Jazz Festival – Wayne Shorter, Terri Lyne Carrington, Leo Genovese and Esperanza Spalding
- Parallel Motion – Yellowjackets

Best Large Jazz Ensemble Album

- Generation Gap Jazz Orchestra – Steven Feifke, Bijon Watson, Generation Gap Jazz Orchestra
- Bird Lives – John Beasley, Magnus Lindgren and SWR Big Band
- Remembering Bob Freedman – Ron Carter and The Jazzaar Festival Big Band directed by Christian Jacob
- Center Stage – Steve Gadd, Eddie Gómez, Ronnie Cuber and WDR Big Band conducted by Michael Abene
- Architecture of Storms – Remy Le Boeuf's Assembly of Shadows

Best Latin Jazz Album

- Fandango at the Wall in New York – Arturo O'Farrill and The Afro Latin Jazz Orchestra featuring The Congra Patria Son Jarocho Collective
- Crisálida – Danilo Pérez featuring The Global Messengers
- If You Will – Flora Purim
- Rhythm & Soul – Arturo Sandoval
- Música de las Américas – Miguel Zenón

== All critically reviewed albums ranked ==
=== Metacritic ===
Number	Artist	Album	Average score	Number of reviews	Reference
1	Jaimie Branch	Fly or Die Fly or Die Fly or Die (world war)	96	8 reviews	
2	The Necks	Travel	91	5 reviews	
3	Joni Mitchell	Joni Mitchell Archives, Vol. 3: The Asylum Years 1972-1975	90	11 reviews	
4	Cécile McLorin Salvant	Melusine	89	4 reviews	
5	James Brandon Lewis	For Mahalia With Love	87	5 reviews	
6	Matana Roberts	Coin Coin: Chapter Five in The Garden	86	7 reviews	
7	Yussef Dayes	Black Classical Music	86	5 reviews	
8	Brad Mehldau	Your Mother Should Know: Brad Mehldau Plays the Beatles	86	4 reviews	
9	Arooj Aftab, Vijay Iyer, and Shahzad Ismaily	Love in Exile	85	5 reviews	
10	London Brew	London Brew	84	6 reviews	
11	Alfa Mist	Variables	84	6 reviews	
12	Rob Mazurek	Lightning Dreamers	84	4 reviews	
13	Natural Information Society	Since Time Is Gravity	84	5 reviews	
14	Idris Ackamoor	Afro Futuristic Dreams	84	5 reviews	
15	Taj Mahal	Savoy	83	6 reviews	
16	Alabaster DePlume	Come with Fierce Grace	83	5 reviews	
17	Irreversible Entanglements	Protect Your Light	81	7 reviews	
18	Thandi Ntuli	Rainbow Revisited	81	6 reviews	
19	John Carroll Kirby	Blowout	81	5 reviews	
20	Joni Mitchell	Joni Mitchell at Newport	80	11 reviews	
21	Kassa	Animals	80	5 reviews	
22	Rickie Lee Jones	Pieces of Treasure	79	6 reviews	
23	High Pulp	Days in the Desert	79	4 reviews	
24	James Brandon Lewis	Eye of I	78	7 reviews	
25	Damon Locks	New Future City Radio	78	4 reviews	
26	Sam Gendel	COOKUP	78	4 reviews	
27	Jonah Yano	Portrait of a Dog	78	4 reviews	
28	Joe Chambers	Dance Kobina	77	4 reviews	
29	Adrian Younge	Tony Allen JID018	77	4 reviews	
20	Pat Metheny	Dream Box	76	5 reviews	
31	Sissoko Segal Parisien Peirani	Les Égarés	76	4 reviews	
32	André 3000	New Blue Sun	75	12 reviews	
33	Angel Bat Dawid	Requiem for Jazz	74	5 reviews	
34	Dinner Party	Enigmatic Society	70	5 reviews	

=== AnyDecentMusic ===
Number	Artist	Album	Average score	Number of reviews	Reference
1	Van Morrison	Moving on Skiffle	7.5	7 reviews	
2	Alfa Mist	Variables	7.5	6 reviews	

== Deaths ==
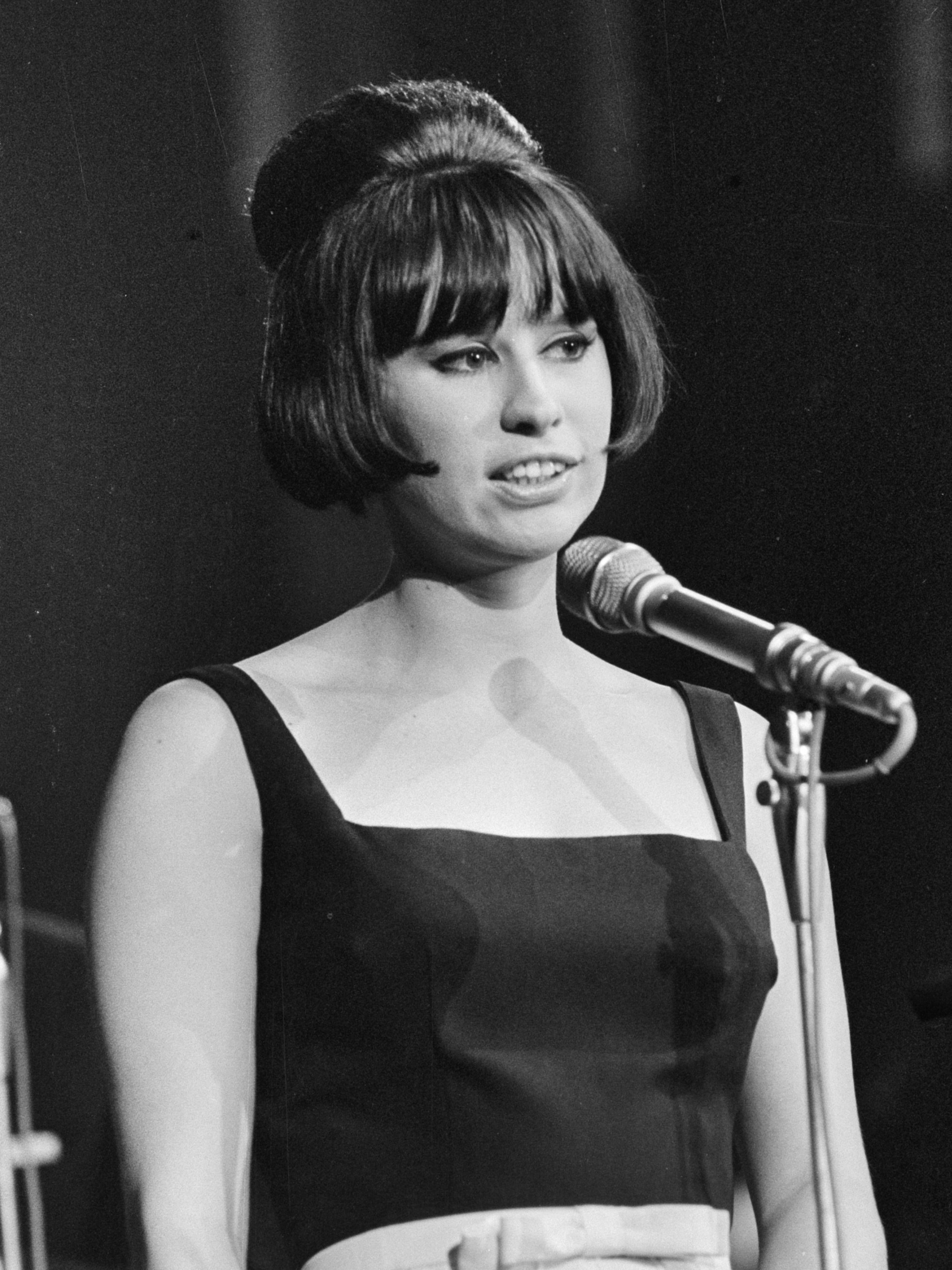
Astrud Gilberto, Brazilian vocalist, who died in June

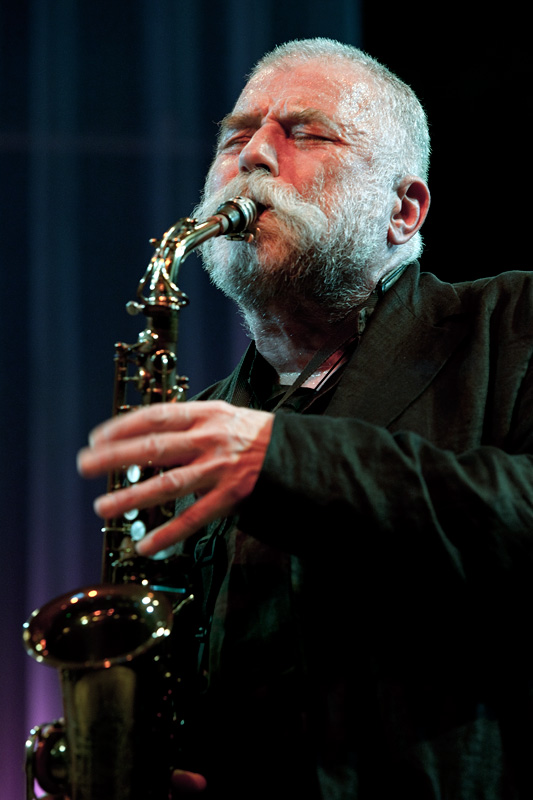
Peter Brötzmann, an influential Free Jazz saxophonist, who died in June

=== January ===
- January 10 – Dennis Budimir, 84, American jazz and rock guitarist (The Wrecking Crew)
- January 17 – Richard Oesterreicher, 90, Austrian jazz guitarist and conductor
- January 18 – Marcel Zanini, 99, Turkish-born French jazz clarinetist
- January 23 – Carol Sloane, 85, American jazz singer

=== February ===
- February 2 – Butch Miles, 78, American drummer
- February 13
  - Guido Basso, 85, Canadian trumpeter.
  - Alain Goraguer, 91, French pianist, arranger and film composer
- February 17 – Jerry Dodgion, 90, American saxophonist and flautist
- February 25 – Carl Saunders, 80, American trumpeter, composer and educator

=== March ===
- March 1 – Wally Fawkes, 98, Canadian-British clarinettist and satirical cartoonist
- March 2 – Wayne Shorter, 89, tenor saxophonist
- March 3 – Carlos Garnett, 84, Panamanian-born jazz saxophonist
- March 9 – Robin Lumley, 74, British jazz keyboardist (Brand X)
- March 13 – Simon Emmerson, 67, English jazz and worldbeat guitarist (Weekend, Working Week, Afro Celt Sound System)
- March 14 – Gloria Bosman, 50, South African jazz singer
- March 15 – Théo de Barros, 80, Brazilian jazz multi-instrumentalist and composer (Quarteto Novo)
- March 16 – Tony Coe, 88, English jazz clarinetist and saxophonist

=== April ===
- April 5 – Duško Gojković, 91, Serbian jazz trumpeter, composer, and arranger
- April 7 – Kidd Jordan, 87, American saxophonist
- April 9 – Karl Berger, 88, German jazz pianist, composer, and educator
- April 16 - Ahmad Jamal, 92, American jazz pianist, composer, and bandleader

=== May ===
- May 14 – Bernt Rosengren, 85, Swedish jazz tenor saxophonist
- May 24 – Bill Lee, 94, American bassist
- May 28 - George Cassidy, 86, Northern Irish tenor saxophonist and music teacher to Van Morrison

=== June ===
- June 5 – Astrud Gilberto, 83, Brazilian vocalist
- June 16 – Peter Dickinson, 88, English experimental pianist and composer
- June 20 – Peter Brötzmann, 82, German free jazz saxophonist
- June 29 – Lilian Terry, 92, Italian jazz singer and composer.

=== July ===
- July 17 – Barry Martyn, 82, English jazz drummer
- July 21 – Tony Bennett, 96, American jazz and traditional pop singer
- July 22 – Knut Riisnæs, 77, Norwegian jazz musician

=== October ===
- October 17 – Carla Bley, 87, American jazz composer and pianist

=== November ===
- November 4 – Michel Pilz, 78, German jazz clarinetist
- November 8 – Dino Piana, 93, Italian jazz musician
- November 20 – Mars Williams, 68, American jazz and rock saxophonist (The Psychedelic Furs, The Waitresses)
- November 21 – Horacio Malvicino, 94, Argentine jazz and tango guitarist and composer

=== December ===
- December 6 – Michel Sardaby, 88, French jazz pianist
- December 26 – Tony Oxley, 85, English jazz drummer
- December 29 – Les McCann, 88, American jazz pianist and singer

== See also ==
- List of 2023 albums
- List of jazz festivals
- List of years in jazz
- 2023 in music
