= 1939 in jazz =

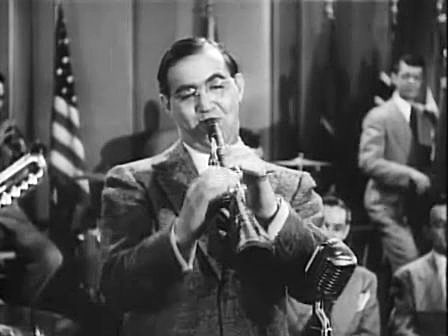
- Clarinetist and bandleader Benny Goodman popularized many of the 1930s standards, including "Darn That Dream", How Deep Is the Ocean, and "Stompin' at the Savoy".
- Decade: 1930s in jazz
- Music: 1939 in music
- Standards: List of 1930s jazz standards
- See also: 1938 in jazz – 1940 in jazz

This is a timeline documenting events of Jazz in the year 1939.

== Events ==
- The earliest formal books on jazz begin to appear, including Wilder Hobson's American Jazz Music and Frederick Ramsey and Charles Edward Smith's Jazzmen.
- Fletcher Henderson becomes the first black musician who is a regular member of a white big band when he joins Benny Goodman, although he does not became a featured artist in the band.
- Charlie Christian makes some revolutionary electric guitar records which allow to the guitar to play lead with the trumpet and the saxophone for the first time.
- The Duke Ellington Band experiences major success. Django Reinhardt records "Montmartre", "Solid Old Man", "Low Cotton" and "Finesse" with the band.

== Deaths ==
February

- 9 – Herschel Evans, tenor saxophonist (born 1909).

May

- 19 – Louis Douglas, American dancer, choreographer, and music businessman (born 1889).

June

- 4 – Tommy Ladnier, American jazz trumpeter (born 1900).
- 16 – Chick Webb, American jazz and swing music drummer as well as a band leader (born 1905).

December

- 22 – Ma Rainey, Blues singer (born 1882).

Unknown date

- Charlie Irvis, American jazz trombonist (born 1899).
- John Robichaux, American jazz bandleader, drummer, and violinist (born 1866).

== Births ==
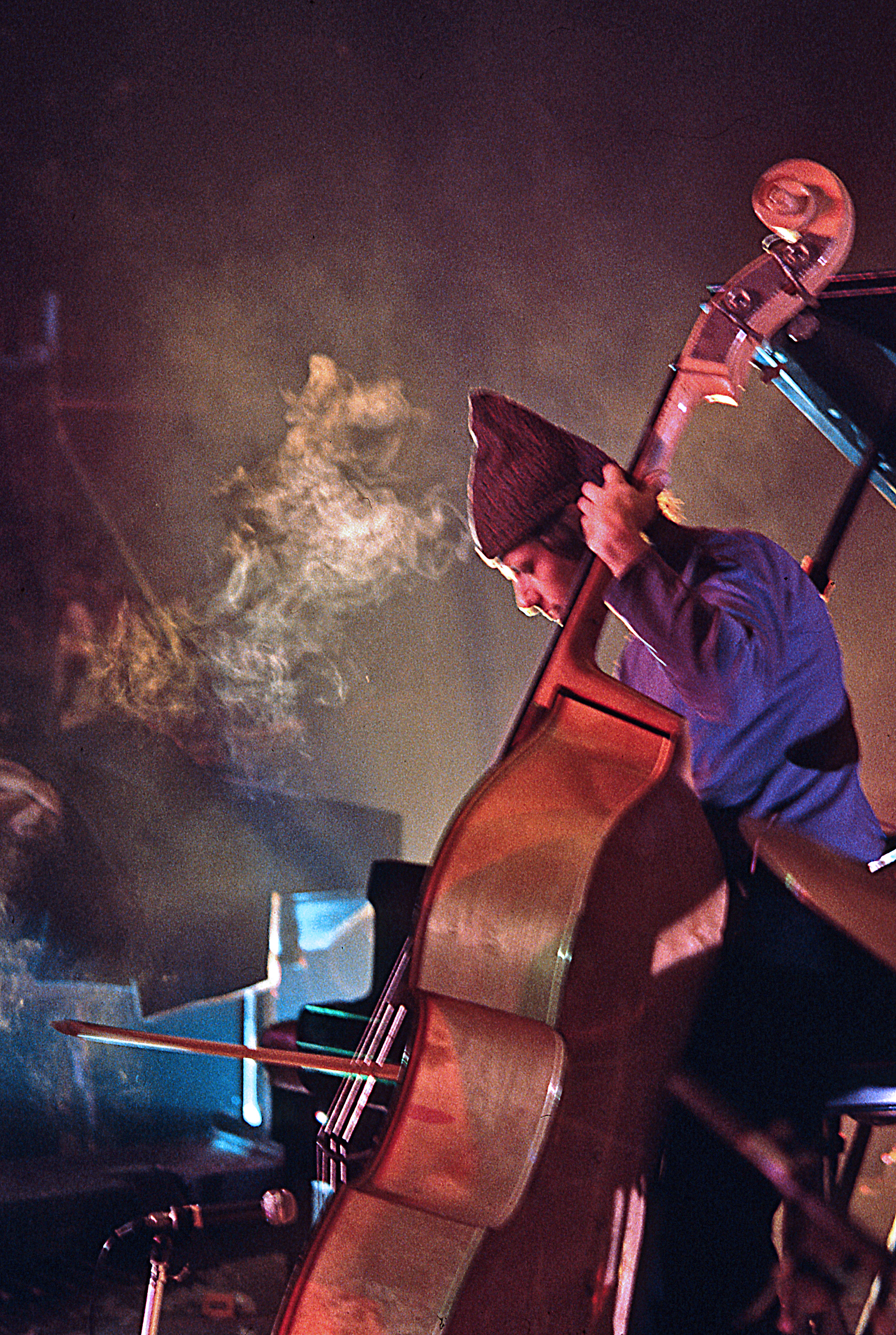
Alan Silva in Belgium in 1969

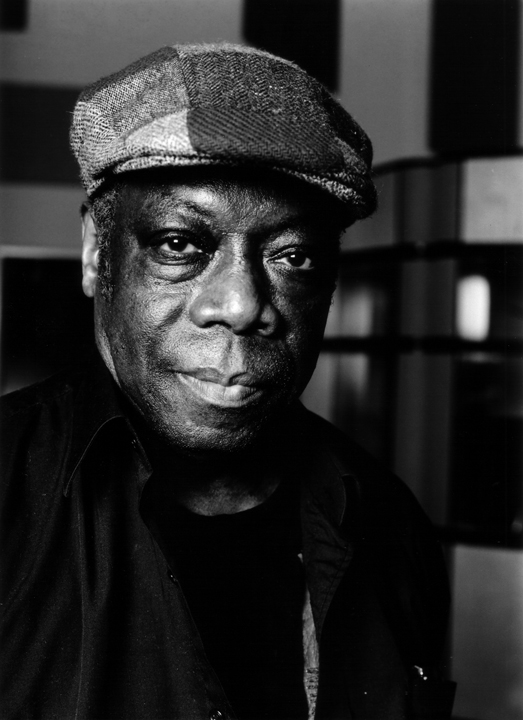
Andrew Cyrille

January

- 3
  - Brian Smith, American saxophonist.
  - Dianne Brooks, American singer (died 2005).
- 15 – Hartmut Geerken, German musician and composer (died 2021).
- 19 – Sam Brown, guitarist (died 1977).
- 22 – Alan Silva, American upright bassist and keyboarder.
- 29 – Jeanne Lee, American singer (died 2000).

February

- 1 – Joe Sample, American pianist, keyboarder and composer (died 2014).
- 5 – Derek Wadsworth, English trombonist, composer, and arranger (died 2008).
- 6 – Jair Rodrigues, Brazilian singer (died 2014).
- 11 – Okay Temiz, Turkish percussionist and drummer.
- 14 – Chris Pyne, English trombonist (died 1995).
- 15 – Csaba Deseo, Hungarian violinist.
- 17 – Bruce Cale, Australian upright bassist and composer.
- 24 – Abu Talib (musician), African-American guitarist, singer, and harmonica player (died 2009).
- 26 – Trevor Watts, English alto and soprano saxophonist.
- 28 – Charles Gayle, American saxophonist, pianist, bass clarinetist, bassist, and percussionist (died 2023).

March

- 14 – Rosa King, American saxophonist/singer (died 2000).
- 19 – Mike Longo, American pianist and composer (died 2020).
- 20 – Larry Harlow, American pianist (died 2021).
- 21 – Christer Boustedt, Swedish saxophonist and actor (died 1986).

April

- 4 – Hugh Masekela, South African trumpeter, singer, and composer (died 2018).
- 23 – Patrick Williams, American composer, arranger, and conductor (died 2018).

May

- 19
  - Sonny Fortune, American saxophonist (died 2018).
  - Richard Teitelbaum, American keyboardist (died 2020).
- 22 – Dick Berk, American drummer and bandleader (died 2014).
- 23
  - Marvin Stamm, American trumpeter.
  - Michel Colombier, French keyboarder and composer (died 2004).
- 25 – Phil Ranelin, American trombonist.
- 28 – Wojciech Karolak, Polish-born organist (died 2021).

June

- 8 – Bill Watrous, American trombonist (died 2018).
- 14 – Kent Carter, American upright bassist.
- 16
  - Albert Dailey, American pianist (died 1984).
  - Lou Gare, English saxophonist (died 2017).
- 22 – Heikki Sarmanto, Finnish jazz pianist, composer
- 26 – George Braith, American saxophonist.
- 30 – Tony Hatch, English composer, songwriter, pianist, arranger, and producer.

July

- 13 – György Szabados, Hungarian pianist (died 2011).
- 16 – Denise LaSalle, African-American blues and R&B/soul singer, songwriter and record producer (d. 2018)
- 18 – Brian Auger, English keyboardist.
- 21 – Jamey Aebersold, American saxophonist and music educator.
- 22 – Mario Rivera, Dominican saxophonist and multi-instrumentalist (died 2007).
- 24 – Charles McPherson, American alto saxophonist.

August

- 9
  - Butch Warren, American upright bassist (died 2013).
  - Ove Stokstad, Norwegian printmaker, clarinetist and saxophonist (died 2018).
- 12 – Mike Cotton, English trumpeter.
- 16 – Mary Stallings, American vocalist.
- 18 – Harald Heide-Steen Jr., (lung cancer), Norwegian actor, comedian and jazz singer (died 2008).
- 19 – Ginger Baker, English drummer, Cream (died 2019).
- 20 – Enrico Rava, Italian trumpeter.
- 31
  - Cleveland Eaton, American upright bassist (died 2020).
  - Paul Winter, American saxophonist.

September

- 9 – Zbigniew Namyslowski, Polish saxophonist, flautist, cellist, trombonist, and pianist (died 2022).
- 10 – Campbell Burnap, British trombonist and broadcaster (died 2008).
- 13 – Elaine Delmar, English singer.
- 18
  - Kate Westbrook, English singer, English-horn player, and flautist.
  - Steve Marcus, American saxophonist (died 2005).
- 24 – Wayne Henderson, American trombonist (died 2014).

October

- 8 – Aladár Pege, Hungarian upright bassist (died 2006).
- 14 – Chris Karan, Australian percussionist.
- 15 – Joe Roccisano, American saxophonist and arranger (died 1997).
- 16 – Andrzej Jastrzebski, Polish tubist.
- 18 – Jan Erik Vold, Norwegian jazz poet.
- 19 – Masabumi Kikuchi, Japanese pianist and composer (died 2015).
- 28 – Andy Bey, American singer and pianist.
- 31 – John Guerin, American percussionist (died 2004).

November

- 1 – Roger Kellaway, American composer, arranger and pianist.
- 3 – Joe McPhee, American multi-instrumentalist.
- 6 – Carlos Emilio Morales, Cuban guitarist (died 2014).
- 10
  - Andrew Cyrille, American drummer.
  - Hubert Laws, American flutist and saxophonist.
- 13 – Idris Muhammad, American drummer (died 2014).
- 16 – Henrik Otto Donner, Finnish composer and trumpeter (died 2013).
- 19 – Tommy Stewart, American trumpeter.
- 26
  - Art Themen, British saxophonist.
  - Greetje Kauffeld, Dutch singer.
- 29
  - Claudio Fasoli, Italian tenor and soprano saxophonist, and composer
  - Meco, American record producer and musician.

December

- 10 – Pekka Pöyry, Finnish saxophonist and flutist (died 1980).
- 17 – James Booker, American keyboardist (died 1983).
- 22 – Nick Ceroli, American drummer (died 1985).
- 25
  - Bob James, American pianist, keyboardist, arranger, and record producer.
  - Don Alias, American percussionist (died 2006).
