= Earl Cross =

- Born: December 8, 1933; St. Louis, Missouri, U.S.
- Died: 1987 (aged 53–54)
- Genre: Free jazz
- Occupation: Musician
- Instruments: Trumpet, flugelhorn, mellophone

Earl Cross (December 8, 1933 – 1987) was a free jazz trumpeter best known for his association with saxophonists Noah Howard and Charles Tyler and percussionist Juma Sultan, as well as with the 1970s loft jazz scene in New York City.

== Career ==
Cross was born and raised in St. Louis, Missouri, and began playing music in his mid-teens. After high school, he entered the Air Force, where he associated with trumpeter Richard Williams, saxophonist Frank Haynes, and pianist Freddie Redd. He then went to California, where he performed in bands led by Larry Williams and Monty Waters, and also led his own group, which featured saxophonists Waters and Dewey Redman, trumpeters Alden Griggs and Norman Spiller, pianist Sonny Donaldson, bassist Benny Wilson, and drummer Art Lewis.

In 1967, Cross moved to New York City and joined a band led by Sun Ra, whom he described as "an institution." During the 1970s, he participated in the loft jazz scene, and recorded with Rashied Ali, Noah Howard, Juma Sultan, and Charles Tyler. He also led ensembles of varying size; a recording of a 1973 live performance by Cross's sextet was released by the Circle label in 1977 with the title Sam Rivers Tuba Trio & Earl Cross Sextet: Jazz of the Seventies.

In 1977, he moved to Holland, where he continued to perform. In 1980, he participated in a concert with saxophonist Idris Ackamoor, bassist Rashied Al Akbar, and drummer Muhammad Ali, a recording of which was released 34 years later by NoBusiness Records with the title Ascent of the Nether Creatures. In 1981, he reunited with Tyler in Stockholm, recording the live albums Definite Volumes 1 and 2, both of which feature his compositions.

Cross died in 1987.

== Tribute ==
The 2003 album Live at the Vision Festival by saxophonist Jemeel Moondoc features a composition titled "Blues for Earl Cross."

== Discography ==
=== As leader or co-leader ===
- Jazz of the Seventies: Sam Rivers Tuba Trio & Earl Cross Sextet (Circle, 1977)
- Ascent of the Nether Creatures with Rashied Al Akbar, Muhammad Ali, and Idris Ackamoor (NoBusiness, 2014) recorded in 1980

=== As sideman ===
With Rashied Ali

- Rashied Ali Quintet (Survival, 1973)

With Noah Howard

- The Black Ark (Freedom, 1972)

With Jackson Krall

- Jackson Krall and the Secret Music Society (Stork, 1991) recorded in 1984

With Juma Sultan's Aboriginal Music Society

- Father of Origin (Eremite, 2011) recorded in 1970–1971
- Whispers from the Archive (Porter, 2012)

With Charles Tyler

- Voyage from Jericho (AK-BA, 1975)
- Saga of the Outlaws (Nessa, 1978)
- At WKCR (Sinner Lady Gloria, 2014) recorded in 1974
- Definite – Volume 1 (Storyville, 1982)
- Definite – Volume 2 (Storyville, 1984)
