= Kalak (album) =

Studio album by Sarathy Korwar
- Released: 11 November 2022
- Studio: Real World Studios
- Genre: Jazz
- Length: 42:38
- Label: The Leaf Label
- Producer: Photay

Kalak (stylized as KALAK) is the fourth studio album by London-based jazz musician Sarathy Korwar. The album, which was produced by Photay, was released via The Leaf Label on 11 November 2022.

== Artwork ==
The album's cover was created by Sijya Gupta and Fabrice Bourgelle. The cover is based on sacred geometry. The circular symbol on the cover represents the circular nature of time and music.

== Release ==
The lead single, "Utopia Is a Colonial Project", was released on 16 August 2022, with a music video directed by Elliott Gonzo.

== Critical response ==
Professional ratings
Aggregate scores
Source	Rating
AnyDecentMusic?	8.0/10
Metacritic	87/100
Review scores
Source	Rating
AllMusic	4/5 stars
The Guardian	5/5 stars
Mojo	4/5 stars
The Observer	4/5 stars
Uncut	8/10

Kalak received positive reviews from critics upon its release. At Metacritic, which assigns a normalized rating out of 100 to reviews from mainstream publications, the album received an average score of 87, based on six reviews, indicating "universal acclaim". Aggregator AnyDecentMusic? gave it 8.0 out of 10, based on their assessment of the critical consensus.

The album was featured on multiple publications' year end lists. Suraya Mohamed of NPR Music placed the album in her top ten of 2022. Jim Carroll, writing for RTÉ, ranked the album as the second best album of 2022. John Mulvey of Mojo ranked it as the 39th best album of 2022 out of 110.
