= Father of Origin =

Studio album by Juma Sultan's Aboriginal Music Society
- Released: 2011
- Recorded: 1970–1971
- Studios: Intermedia Sound Studios, Boston, Massachusetts; AMS studio, New York City; Tinker Street Cinema, Woodstock New York
- Genre: Free jazz
- Labels: Eremite; MTE-54/55/56
- Producer: Michael Ehlers

Juma Sultan chronology
Father of Origin (2011)	Whispers from the Archive (2012)

Father of Origin is a box set album by multi-instrumentalist Juma Sultan and his open-ended ensemble the Aboriginal Music Society. Drawn from Sultan's archive of recorded material, and released by Eremite Records in 2011, it consists of two vinyl LPs, a CD, and a book containing photos and an extensive essay by jazz scholar Michael Heller, all of which help to document aspects of the loft jazz era of the early 1970s.

The first LP of the set was recorded on September 31, 1970, at Intermedia Sound Studios in Boston, Massachusetts, and features Sultan on a variety of instruments, joined by his primary musical partner at the time, percussionist Ali Abuwi, along with saxophonist Gene Dinwiddie, trumpeter Earl Cross, electric guitarist Ralph Walsh, and drummer Phillip Wilson. On the second LP, recorded on April 2, 1971, at AMS studio in New York City, we hear a trio composed of Sultan, Abuwi, and saxophonist Frank Lowe. (Side one of this LP is played at 33 rpm, while side two is played at 45 rpm.) The CD, recorded "post 1969" at Tinker Street Cinema in Woodstock, New York, documents a meeting during which members of Sultan's organization (Sultan, Abuwi, Dinwiddie, and Wilson) played with musicians from the Black Artists Group, based in St. Louis, Missouri, and featuring saxophonist Julius Hemphill, cellist Abdul Wadud, bassist Rod Hicks, and percussionist Charles "Bobo" Shaw.

The album title is related to Sultan's concept of "Aboriginal Music", and refers to his search for the music's "Father of Origin" (interpreting the root of "aboriginal" as "abba", or father).

Eremite customers who purchased the first 100 copies of Father of Origin also received a 7" release that featured "dub" remixes of two of the album's tracks, created by Joshua Abrams.

== Reception ==
Professional ratings
Review scores
Source	Rating
DownBeat	4/5 stars
Jazzwise	4/5 stars

In a review for The New York Times, Ben Ratliff called Sultan "a link between free jazz and Jimi Hendrix, and a puzzle piece in the history of musicians' cooperatives." He described the album as "a lavish and thorough monument to a chapter of jazz in which the cultural politics were sometimes more interesting than the music... a cool, collected document of a wobbly, scratchy time" and stated that the recordings "suggest the struggle and chaos of the most purely democratic free jazz, in which there wasn't really a stable common language."

DownBeat's Peter Margasak noted that the album "pulls back the curtain on one of the more intriguing and forgotten figures from the earliest days of New York's loft jazz scene," and commented: "Sultan and... Abuwi lay down thick but open African-derived grooves in lengthy collective jams... The music subscribes to a strong ensemble orientation - it's all improvised, and there's no grandstanding."

Edwin Pouncey of Jazzwise called the box set "astonishing," and remarked: "there is an alluring sense of psychedelia trailing through this set that mingles with the more revolutionary free jazz gusts... Recorded when most of the major labels had lost all interest in the free jazz movement, Sultan's AMS recordings returns to the liberated underground roots of the music to celebrate its unique message and carry it further."

Writing for Dusted Magazine, Bill Meyer stated: "It's thrilling stuff, and it's easy to get lost in the music's white water flow. While packaging aficionados will swoon over Father of Origin's beautiful execution, it's the way the sounds take you away that proves its significance."

In an article for Point of Departure, Stuart Broomer commented: "The music of the Aboriginal Music Society is real and in this treatment sounds real in a way that music rarely can now... This is forceful music that aims to strip away the limitations of jazz, including the limitations of received language and virtuosity. It's a stirring aesthetic for improvised music. Even if very few people seem to want to listen to it, far more people should actually do it."

Clifford Allen of Tiny Mix Tapes wrote: "The whole set is beautifully presented... With hands and feet in the upstate artists' environment as well as the Black Arts lofts that formed part of the architecture of 1970s New York jazz, the Aboriginal Music Society's branches could be traced to almost any other ensemble or musician during this time period. Thankfully recorded documentation has been preserved and the fragments presented here are choice."

The Downtown Music Gallery's Bruce Lee Gallanter remarked: "This old-school multi-media extravaganza exposes some of the most extraordinary & explosive free jazz of the period to the light of day for the first time... AMS synthesized an African approach to percussion and collective performance with the revolutionary jazz of its day. In open-ended free improvisations they played an incendiary mix of massive trap kit & hand drum grooves & heaven-storming free jazz. The music was a cry of freedom, a declaration of black cultural artistic & political independence; & until now it has not been heard since the day it was made."

The editors of The New York City Jazz Record included the album in their "Best of 2011" listing in two categories: "Unearthed Gems" and "Boxed Sets." Nate Chinen of JazzTimes featured the album in his 2011 Critic's List in the "Historical/Reissue" category.

== Track listings and personnel ==
LP #1 track listing

1. "Fan Dance Part I" (group improvisation) – 16:18
2. "Fan Dance Part II" (group improvisation) – 3:06
3. "Fan Dance Part III" (group improvisation) – 3:49
4. "Ode to a Gypsy Son" (Juma Sultan) – 13:48

LP #1 personnel

- Juma Sultan – bass, hand drums, percussion, ahoudt, wooden flutes
- Ali Abuwi – hand drums, percussion, flutes
- Gene Dinwiddie – tenor saxophone, soprano saxophone, flute
- Earl Cross – trumpet, mellophone, piano
- Ralph Walsh – electric guitar
- Phillip Wilson – drums

LP #2 track listing

1. "Untitled" (group improvisation) – 17:54
2. "Sundance" (Juma Sultan) – 8:05

LP #2 personnel

- Juma Sultan – bass, hand drums, percussion, alto saxophone
- Ali Abuwi – hand drums, percussion
- Frank Lowe – tenor saxophone, percussion

CD track listing

1. "Untitled" (group improvisation) – 25:43
2. "Untitled Part II" (group improvisation) – 21:57

CD personnel

- Juma Sultan – bass, hand drums, percussion
- Ali Abuwi – hand drums, percussion, oboe
- Gene Dinwiddie – flute
- Julius Hemphill – alto saxophone
- Abdul Wadud – cello
- Rod Hicks – bass
- Charles "Bobo" Shaw – hand drums, percussion
- Phillip Wilson – drums
