= More Arriving =

Studio album by Sarathy Korwar
- Released: 26 July 2019
- Genre: Jazz
- Label: The Leaf Label

More Arriving is the second studio album by US-born, Indian-raised, London-based drummer, percussionist, composer and bandleader Sarathy Korwar.

== Background ==
More Arriving was released on 26 July 2019 through The Leaf Label. The album was recorded over three years in Mumbai and London and incorporates rappers from Mumbai and New Delhi with spoken word and Korwar's own Indian classical influence and jazz instrumentation. The album features the Jamaican-Indian rapper Delhi Sultanate, the London poet Zia Ahmed and the Abu Dhabi writer Deepak Unnikrishnan among others. “This is what Indian music sounds like to me right now", says Korwar in The Guardian. "That means incorporating multiple brown voices. If anyone has a problem with that, they should be questioning what they think Indian music should be.”

== Critical reception ==
On the Metacritic website, which aggregates various media and press reviews and assigns a normalised rating out of 100, More Arriving received a score of 87. The Quietus called the album "confrontational" and "musically far-reaching" and praised its "bursts of reggae wooziness, gnarled free-jazz atonality, and electronic noise". Supreme Standard called the album "biting and acerbic, funny and furious, and [featuring] some of its creator’s finest, most accessible compositions to date" and made it Album Of The Week upon its release. The Guardian praised the "Carnatic rhythms and lyrical dexterity" of the track "Mumbay", where "MC Mawali puns in Hindi on the colonial resonance of “Bombay” compared to the rightwing nationalism of “Mumbai”".

More Arriving won Best Independent Album at The AIM Awards in 2020.

== Track listing ==
| No. | Title | Length |
|---|---|---|
| 1. | "Mumbay (feat. MC Mawali)" | 5:28 |
| 2. | "Jallaad" | 0:23 |
| 3. | "C****e (feat. Delhi Sultanate & Prabh Deep)" | 5:25 |
| 4. | "Bol (feat. Zia Ahmed & Aditya Prakash)" | 9:20 |
| 5. | "Mango (feat. Zia Ahmed)" | 3:39 |
| 6. | "City Of Words (feat. TRAP POJU & Mirande)" | 12:02 |
| 7. | "Good Ol' Vilayati (feat. Mirande)" | 4:21 |
| 8. | "Pravasis (feat. Deepak Unnikishnan)" | 2:17 |

== Personnel ==
- Sarathy Korwar - drums, percussion, composition
- Zia Ahmed - Vocals
- Mirande - vocals
- MC Mawali - vocals
- Delhi Sultanate - vocals
- Prabh Deep - vocals
- Aditya Prakash - vocals
- TRAP POJU - vocals
- Deepak Unnikrishnan - vocals
- Tamar Osborne - baritone saxophone, soprano saxophone, flute
- Al McSween - keys
- Dan Leavers - synthesiser
- Chris Williams - alto saxophone
- Ruth Goller - bass guitar
- Giuliano Modarelli - guitar
- Aditya Prakash - percussion
- Magnus Mehta - percussion
- Gandhaar Amin - flute
- Karim Sultan - oud
