= 2021 in jazz =

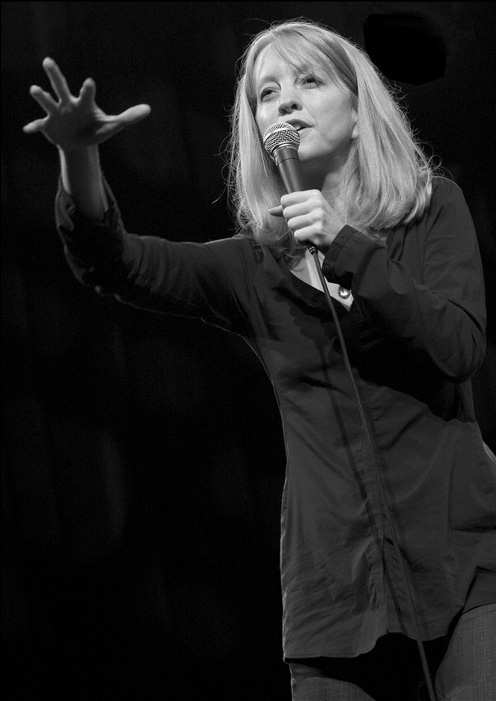
- Maria Schneider, whose album Data Lords was voted best of 2020 by critics in January 2021
- Decade: 2020s in jazz
- Music: 2021 in music
- Standards: List of jazz standards
- See also: 2020 in jazz – 2022 in jazz

This is a timeline documenting events of jazz in the year 2021.

== Events ==
=== January ===
- January 14 – The 2020 NPR Music Jazz Critics Poll rates Maria Schneider's Data Lords as the best album of 2020.

=== March ===
- March 14 - The 63rd Annual Grammy Awards occur. Jazz winners include:
  - Kurt Elling wins Best Jazz Vocal Album for his 2019 album Secrets are the Best Stories
  - Chick Corea, Christian McBride & Brian Blade win Best Jazz Instrumental Album for their 2021 album Trilogy 2
  - The Maria Schneider Orchestra wins Best Large Jazz Ensemble Album for its 2020 album Data Lords
  - Arturo O'Farrill & The Afro Latin Jazz Orchestra win Best Latin Jazz Album for their album Four Questions

=== July ===
- July 30 - Shabaka Hutchings from Sons Of Kemet founds a new UK Jazz record label, "Native Rebel Recordings"
  - July 30-August 1 – The Newport Jazz Festival takes place in the US state of Rhode Island. Performers include Gerald Clayton, Charles Lloyd, Mavis Staples, Trombone Shorty, Kamasi Washington and Brandee Younger.

=== September ===
October

- October 21 - Takuya Kuroda releases "Midnight Crisp"

November

=== December ===
- December 4 - Promises (Floating Points, Pharoah Sanders and the London Symphony Orchestra album) is named album of the year 2021 by TIME magazine

== Albums ==
Month	Day	Album	Artist	Label	Notes	Ref.
March	5	Flor	Gretchen Parlato	Edition Records	Received nomination for Grammy Award for Best Jazz Vocal Album	
March	5	Road to the Sun	Pat Metheny	Sony BMG		
March	26	Daring Mind	Jihye Lee Orchestra	Motema Music		
March	26	Promises	Floating Points, Pharoah Sanders and the London Symphony Orchestra	Luaka Bop		
April	9	Uneasy (album)	Vijay Iyer, Linda May Han Oh, Tyshawn Sorey	ECM Records		
May	14	Black To The Future	Sons Of Kemet	Impulse! Records		
May	28	Another Land	Dave Holland	Edition Records	with Kevin Eubanks and Obed Calvaire	
May	28	Nafs at Peace	Jaubi	Astigmatic Records		
June	11	Squint	Julian Lage	Blue Note Records		
July	9	Now Pronouncing	Caity Gyorgy		Awarded Juno Award for Vocal Jazz Album of the Year	
August	20	Martian Kitties	Gordon Grdina and Jim Black			
August	27	Sounds from the Ancestors	Kenny Garrett	Mack Avenue Records		
September	3	Kinds of Love	Renee Rosnes	Smoke Sessions Records		
September	10	Side-Eye (V1. IV)	Pat Metheny	BMG Modern Recordings		
September	14	The Cave Of Winds	Tony Malaby	Pyroclastic		
September	24	Songwrights Apothecary Lab	Esperanza Spalding	Concord Records	Awarded Grammy Award for Best Jazz Vocal Album	
October	8	SuperBlue	Kurt Elling	Edition Records		
November	12	Crisis	Louis Hayes	Savant Records		
November	19	A Love Sonnet for Billie Holiday	Jack DeJohnette, Vijay Iyer, Wadada Leo Smith	TUM Records		
December	3	New Standards	Kenny G	Concord Records		

== Deaths ==
- January 6 – Bobby Few, 85, American jazz pianist
- January 17 – Sammy Nestico, 96, American composer and arranger
- January 20 – Keith Nichols, 75, British instrumentalist and bandleader (COVID-19)
- January 23 – Jonas Gwangwa, 83, South African jazz trombonist
- February 9 – Chick Corea, 79, American pianist, composer and bandleader
- February 12 – Milford Graves, 79, American drummer and polymath
- March 2 – Chris Barber, 90, British bandleader and trombonist
- March 7 – Josky Kiambukuta, 72, Congolese singer (TPOK Jazz)
- March 8 – Julien-François Zbinden, 103, Swiss composer and jazz pianist
- March 10 – János Gonda, 89, Hungarian jazz pianist
- March 19 – Cristián Cuturrufo, 48, Chilean jazz trumpeter (COVID-19)
- March 28 – Malcolm Cecil, 84, British jazz bassist and record producer
- April 7 – Sonny Simmons, 87, American jazz saxophonist
- May 8 – Curtis Fuller, 88, American jazz trombonist
- May 15 – Mario Pavone, 80, American jazz bassist, composer and bandleader
- June 21 – Nobuo Hara, 94, Japanese saxophonist
- July 4 – Rick Laird, 80, Irish jazz bassist (Mahavishnu Orchestra)
- July 31 – Jerzy Matuszkiewicz, 93, Polish jazz musician and composer
- August 28 – Francesc Burrull, 86, Spanish musician and composer
- September 16 –George Mraz, 77, Czech-American jazz bassist
- September 28 - Dr. Lonnie Smith, 79, American jazz Hammond B3 organist
- October 18 – Franco Cerri, 95, Italian jazz guitarist.
- November 1 – Pat Martino, 77, American jazz guitarist.
- November 18 - Slide Hampton, 89, American jazz trombonist, composer and arranger.
- December 8 - Barry Harris, 91, American jazz pianist, bandleader, composer, arranger, and educator

== See also ==
- List of 2021 albums
- List of jazz festivals
- List of years in jazz
- 2020s in jazz
- 2021 in music
