= Hagaw =

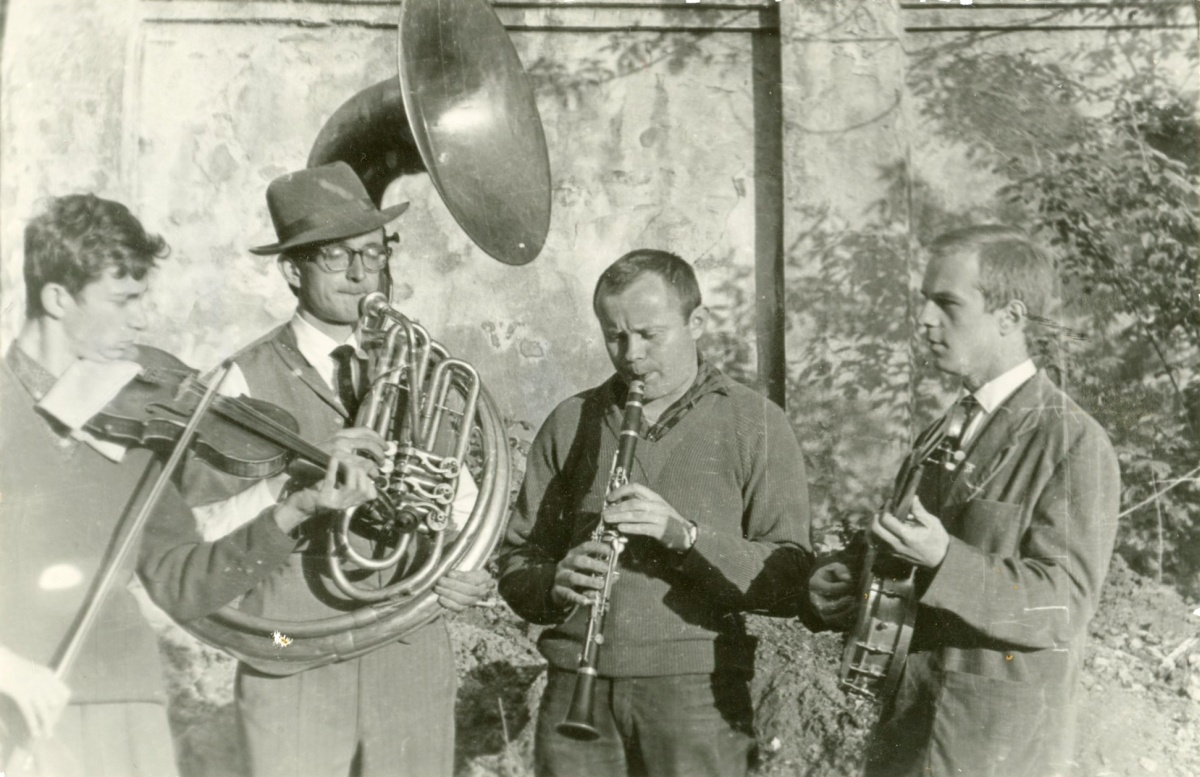
- The original Hagaw lineup: Kowalski (violin), Jastrzebski (sousaphone), Bielecki (clarinet), Brudko (banjo)

Background information
- Also known as: Asocjacja Hagaw
- Origin: Warsaw, Poland
- Genres: Jazz
- Years active: 1964–present

Hagaw, also known as Asocjacja Hagaw, is a Polish traditional jazz band, formed as a quintet at the Klub Stodoła in Warsaw in 1964 by Andrzej Jastrzębski, and named from the initials of the first names of its founding members. The original lineup consisted of Jastrzębski, Grzegorz Brudko, Henryk Kowalski, Wiesław Papliński, and Andrzej Bielecki. The lineup has since changed many times.

== Discography ==
- 1967 - Do you love Hagaw?
- 1970 - Asocjacja Hagaw i Andrzej Rosiewicz
- 1971 - Assoziation Hagaw "with Goldies But Goodies"
- 1974 - Assoziation Hagaw "Ich hab' das Fraeulein Helen Baden sehen"
- 1975 - Asocjacja Hagaw & Andrzej Rosiewicz
- 1976 - Hagaw "Veronika, der Lenz ist da"
- 1977 - Asocjacja Hagaw Andrzej Rosiewicz Ewa Olszewska
- 1979 - Hagaw
- 1980 - Manhattan
- 1980 - A.Rosiewicz i Hagaw "Ufo/Zniwo"
- 1986 - Please
- 2006 - Association Hagaw in Koncert /Berlin 2006
