= Ascent of the Nether Creatures =

Live album by Rashied Al Akbar, Muhammad Ali, Earl Cross, and Idris Ackamoor
- Released: 2014
- Recorded: July 12, 1980
- Venue: Netherlands
- Genre: Free jazz
- Labels: NoBusiness Records; NBLP 78
- Producer: Danas Mikailionis

Ascent of the Nether Creatures is a live album by bassist Rashied Al Akbar, drummer Muhammad Ali, trumpeter Earl Cross, and saxophonist Idris Ackamoor. It was recorded on July 12, 1980, in the Netherlands, and was released on LP in limited quantities by NoBusiness Records in 2014.

== Reception ==
Professional ratings
Review scores
Source	Rating
All About Jazz	3.5/5 stars

In a review for All About Jazz, John Sharpe described the album as "spirited and still vital music," and wrote: "The polyphonic blending of Cross' waspish angularities and Ackamoor's sinuous legato is what creates the excitement on this date... on bass Rashied Al Akbar furnishes a sturdy foundation in tandem with drummer Muhammad Ali."

Derek Taylor of Dusted Magazine stated: "the music offers more than trading card scarcity in its snapshot of American players holding court in Europe at the cusp of the loft jazz era."

Writing for The List, Stewart Smith called the album "a thrilling live set from four undersung Loft-era musicians," and commented: "The raw fidelity only adds to the excitement, with the music working itself into a blurry ecstasy as the small crowd whoops and cheers."

A reviewer for The Quietus remarked: "Cross tilts his trumpet towards heaven, unspooling knotty bop themes and engaging in spiralling interplay with Ackamoor's saxophone... Ali is on explosive form throughout, maintaining a free pulse while unleashing rolling thunder around the toms. Encompassing classic fire music, free bop and abstract night-music, Ascent is one of the archival jazz releases of the year."

The New York City Jazz Record's Ken Waxman described the recording as "Startlingly high-class free jazz from an unheralded quartet of journeymen Americans," noting that "certainly no one in this sometimes raggedly recorded club date from somewhere in the Netherlands, was drawn by star power." He wrote: "The organization of this strong performance shows that avant-garde impulses had permeated the DNA of even less-celebrated players working clubs in the '80s. More crucially, a long-drawn-out near-orgasmic squeal from someone present as the quartet concluded its performance corroborates that the audience was enthralled as well."

== Track listing ==
Track timings not provided.

Side A

1. "Earl's Tune" (Earl Cross)
2. "Ascent of the Nether Creatures" (Idris Ackamoor)

Side B

1. "Ascent of the Nether Creatures (Continues)" (Idris Ackamoor)
2. "Evenings" (Earl Cross, Rashied Al Akbar, Muhammad Ali, Idris Ackamoor)
3. "4 for 1" (Earl Cross, Rashied Al Akbar, Muhammad Ali, Idris Ackamoor)

== Personnel ==
- Idris Ackamoor – alto and tenor saxophone
- Earl Cross – trumpet
- Rashied Al Akbar – bass
- Muhammad Ali – drums
