= Idris Ackamoor =

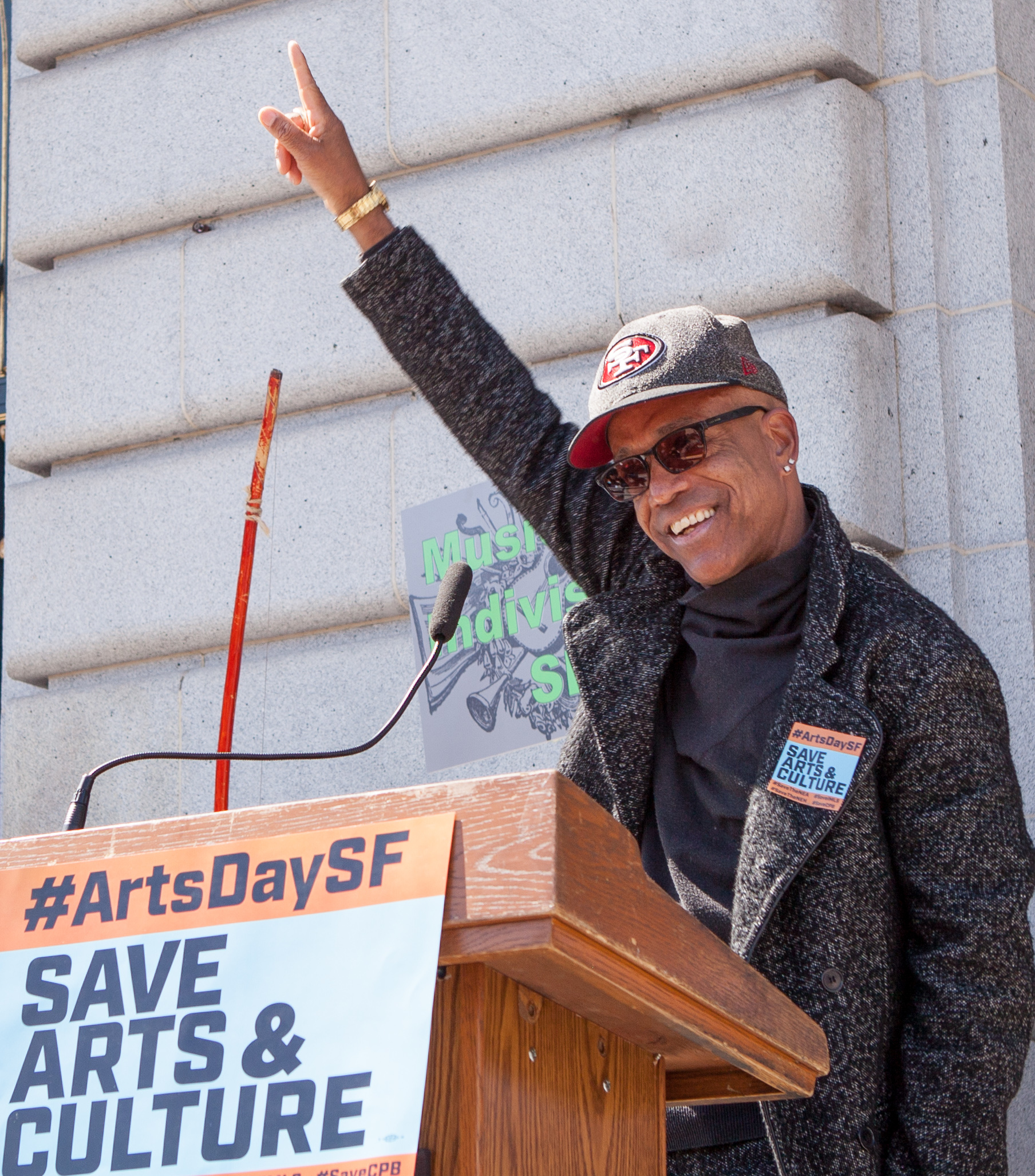
- At San Francisco City Hall, March 2017

Background information
- Born: Bruce Baker; January 9, 1951 (age 75); Chicago, Illinois, US
- Origin: Yellow Springs, Ohio, US
- Genres: Jazz, afrobeat
- Member of: The Pyramids

Idris Ackamoor (born Bruce Baker, January 9, 1951) is an American multi-instrumentalist, composer, actor, tap dancer, producer, administrator, and director. He is also artistic director of the jazz ensemble The Pyramids.

== The Pyramids ==
He founded the band The Pyramids in the early 1970s at Antioch College in Ohio as part of Cecil Taylor's Black Music Ensemble. The band toured Africa in the 1970s, adding musicians and new instruments, before settling in San Francisco in the US. Exploratory self-releases Lalibela (1973), King Of Kings (1974), and Birth / Speed / Merging (1976) had very limited runs, being sold only at concerts out of the trunks of their cars.

The band split up in 1977, but Ackamoor has reformed the Pyramids several times. Strut Records released new studio albums by the band in the 2010s: We Be All Africans and An Angel Fell. Their 2023 album Afro Futuristic Dreams refers to the work of science fiction writers Octavia E. Butler and Samuel R. Delany.

== Discography ==
- Portrait (1998)
- Centurian (2000)
- Homage to Cuba (2004)
- An Angel Fell (2018)
- Shaman! (2020)
- Afro Futuristic Dreams (2023)

With Earl Cross, Rashied Al Akbar, and Muhammad Ali

- Ascent of the Nether Creatures (NoBusiness, 2014) recorded in 1980
