= Nafs at Peace =

Studio album by Jaubi
- Released: May 28, 2021
- Recorded: April & August 2019
- Studio: Riot Studios (Lahore, Pakistan); Newtone Studios (Oslo, Norway)
- Genre: Spiritual jazz; Hindustani classical music
- Length: 42:38
- Label: Astigmatic

Jaubi chronology
The Deconstructed Ego (2016)	Nafs at Peace (2021)	In Search of a Better Tomorrow (2023)

Nafs at Peace is the debut studio album by the Lahore-based jazz quartet Jaubi. The album was released on May 28, 2021, via Astigmatic Records.

== Background and recording ==
Jaubi consists of Ali Riaz Baqar, Zohaib Hassan Khan, Qammar "Vicky" Abbas, and Kashif Ali Dhani. The band formed in 2013 in Lahore, Pakistan. After a collaboration on Ed "Tenderlonious" Cawthorne's 2020 album Ragas from Lahore, the band gained wider international recognition. The music in Nafs at Peace draws from two recording sessions, both including Marek "Latarnik" Pędziwiatr of EABS and Tenderlonious. The first session took place in one day at Riot Studios in Lahore in April 2019, while the second took place at Newtone Studios in Oslo, Norway in August 2019.

The album's title comes from the Sufi word for "self". The self is described in the Quran as having three parts; due to this, the album is split into three parts. According to Dhruva Balram of DJ Mag, the album is entwined with themes of "death, divorce, unemployment, drug addiction and religion". The album cover is the mother of Ali Riaz Baqar.

== Music ==
Critics have found elements of spiritual jazz, Hindustani classical music, hip-hop, funk, ragas, and ambient in the album. The album uses the tabla, electric guitar, sarangi, flute, saxophone, keyboards, synths, drum kit, and electronics.

The opening track "Seek Refuge" is ambient and uses electronic drones and vocals from Oslo's Vox Humana choir. "Insia" was described by Thom Jurek of AllMusic as "elliptically funky". "Straight Path” is the album's thematic and musical centerpiece according to Bhanuj Kappal of Pitchfork. Its title comes from the first chapter of the Quran. Jurek described "Zari" as a contemporary jazz jam. The eight-minute closer "Nafs At Peace" takes influence from John Coltrane's A Love Supreme and is the closest on the album to a more traditional jazz sound.

== Reception ==
Professional ratings
Review scores
Source	Rating
Thom Jurek of AllMusic	4/5 stars
Ammar Kalia of The Guardian	4/5 stars
Bhanuj Kappal of Pitchfork	7.6 / 10

Thom Jurek of AllMusic gave the album four out of five stars and wrote "simply put, Nafs at Peace is stellar". According to Dhruva Balram of DJ Mag, Jaubi "have created an album that functions as a balm for souls in need of calming". Bhanuj Kappal of Pitchfork gave the album 7.6 points out of 10, and praised it for pushing Hindustani classical music to new places.

== Track listing ==
1. "Seek Refuge" – 2:18
2. "Insia" – 5:15
3. "Raga Gurji Todi" – 6:13
4. "Straight Path" – 7:27
5. "Mosty" – 7:40
6. "Zari" – 5:51
7. "Nafs at Peace" – 7:54

Total length – 42:38

== Personnel ==
Adapted from the album's liner notes on Bandcamp.

=== Musicians ===
- Ali Riaz Baqar – guitar, composer (all tracks except 5), photography
- Zohaib Hassan Khan – sarangi
- Qammar "Vicky" Abbas – drums
- Kashif Ali Dhani – tabla, vocals
- Ed "Tenderlonious" Cawthorne – flute, soprano saxophone
- Marek "Latarnik" Pędziwiatr – rhodes, keyboards, synths, composer (track 5)
- Vox Humana choir – vocals (track 1)

=== Additional personnel ===
- André Viervoll – audio engineer
- Farhad Humayun – audio engineer
- Rhys Downing – mixing
- Paweł Bartnik – mastering
- Łukasz Wojciechowski – executive producer, A&R
- Sebastian Jóźwiak – A&R, photography
- Oliver Reeves – A&R
- Uzma Rao – photography
- Animisiewasz – graphic design
- İlkay Kanar – calligraphy
