= Not Tight =

Studio album by Domi and JD Beck
- Released: July 29, 2022
- Studios: DOMi & JD BECK Headquarters; Larrabee Sound Studios (North Hollywood, CA)
- Genre: Jazz fusion
- Length: 44:08
- Labels: Apeshit Inc., Blue Note Records
- Producers: DOMi & JD BECK

Domi and JD Beck chronology
Not Tight (2022)	Who Asked? (2026)

Singles from Not Tight
- 1. "Thank U" Released: April 22, 2022; 2. "Smile" Released: April 29, 2022; 3. "Whatup" Released: June 24, 2022; 4. "Take a Chance" Released: July 6, 2022

Not Tight (stylized as NOT TiGHT) is the debut studio album by Domi and JD Beck. It was released on July 29, 2022, through Apeshit Inc. and Blue Note Records. It was nominated for Best Contemporary Instrumental Album at the 65th Grammy Awards.

== Release ==
Domi and JD Beck announced the release of Not Tight in June 2022 shortly after signing to Anderson .Paak's label Apeshit Inc. The album's release was preceded by four singles, including "Take a Chance", which featured Paak and was accompanied by a music video directed by Paak.

In August 2022, Domi and JD Beck performed a Tiny Desk Concert for NPR, featuring four tracks from the album. It was their first time performing the song "U Don't Have to Rob Me" in front of a live audience, which features both artists on vocals.

== Critical reception ==
Professional ratings
Aggregate scores
Source	Rating
Metacritic	82/100
Review scores
Source	Rating
AllMusic	3.5/5 stars
NME	4/5 stars
Pitchfork	7.3/10
PopMatters	9/10

Not Tight was met with critical acclaim. At Metacritic, the album received an aggregate score of 82 based on 5 reviews, indicating "universal acclaim".

Writing for Pitchfork, writer Kieran Press-Reynolds praised Domi and JD Beck's technical virtuosity, calling the album "a smooth but frenetic set aimed at bringing jazz fusion to a new hyper-brained generation." In a positive review for PopMatters, contributor Brandon Miller complimented the duo's "jaw-dropping" musicianship and chemistry, noting the album's "incredible time feel, unconventional beats, not to mention neo-soul and gospel-stretching harmonies." Other critics praised the album's "youthful charm", "stacked lineup" of featured artists, and rapid-fire breakbeats and chord changes over complex time signatures.

NPR's Bobby Carter called the album "ironically titled." Reviewing the album for AllMusic, Matt Collar wrote that, "DOMi & JD BECK often favor the overall vibe of a given track over, say, soloing in a traditional jazz sense. Consequently, it can be easy to ignore just how technically gifted Louna and Beck are in pure jazz terms."

== Track listing ==
All tracks are written by Domi Louna and JD Beck, except as noted.

No.	Title	Writer(s)	Length
1.	"Louna's Intro"		1:01
2.	"Whatup"		2:28
3.	"Smile"		3:11
4.	"Bowling" (feat. Thundercat)	Louna, Beck, Stephen Bruner	1:59
5.	"Not Tight" (feat. Thundercat)	Louna, Beck, Bruner	4:08
6.	"Two Shrimps" (feat. Mac DeMarco)	Louna, Beck, DeMarco	3:05
7.	"U Don't Have to Rob Me"		2:41
8.	"Moon" (feat. Herbie Hancock)	Louna, Beck, Brandon Anderson, Hancock	4:31
9.	"Duke"		2:21
10.	"Take a Chance" (feat. Anderson .Paak)	Louna, Beck, Anderson, Tayla Parx	4:24
11.	"Space Mountain"		2:26
12.	"Pilot" (feat. Snoop Dogg, Busta Rhymes, and Anderson .Paak)	Louna, Beck, Anderson, Trevor George Smith Jr., Calvin Broadus	3:22
13.	"Whoa" (feat. Kurt Rosenwinkel)		4:03
14.	"Sniff"		3:35
15.	"Thank U"		0:45
Total length:			44:08

Notes

- Every song title is stylized in all capital letters, except every letter "i" is lowercase.

== Personnel ==
Domi & JD Beck

- Domi Louna – keyboards (all), vocals (4, 7, 10), backing vocals (5, 6, 8), producer, recording engineer
- JD Beck – drums (2–14), vocals (7, 10), producer, recording engineer

Additional musicians

- Lara Somogyi – harp (1, 15)
- Leah Zeger – viola, violin (1, 15)
- Isaiah Cage – cello (1, 15)
- Chloe Tallet – flute, piccolo (1, 15)
- Stephen Pfeifer – contrabass (1, 15)
- Thundercat – bass (4, 5), vocals (4)
- Mac DeMarco – vocals (6)
- Herbie Hancock – piano, vocoder (8)
- Anderson .Paak – vocals (10, 12)
- Snoop Dogg – vocals (12)
- Busta Rhymes – vocals (12)
- Kurt Rosenwinkel – guitar (13)

Production

- Jhair "Jha" Lazo – recording engineer, mixing
- Julio Ulloa – assistant mixing engineer
- Delaney Leyden – recording engineer (13)
- Mike Bozzi - mastering
- McKay Felt – painting
- Carlos Lopez – set design
- Tehillah De Castro – photography
- Dante Pasquinelli – colorist

== Charts ==
Chart (2022)	Peak position
US Top Contemporary Jazz Albums (Billboard)	1
