= Andrzej Jastrzębski =

Polish jazz tuba player (born 1939)

Andrzej Jastrzębski (born October 16, 1939) is a Polish jazz tuba player.

He debuted in 1960 as a member of Beat Back Step Jazz. In the period 1962-1967 he was associated with the Ragtime Jazz Band. He was the founder of the band Hagaw, with whom he collaborated from 1964 until the end of 1965. In the years 1969-1983 he belonged to the Vistula River Brass Band.

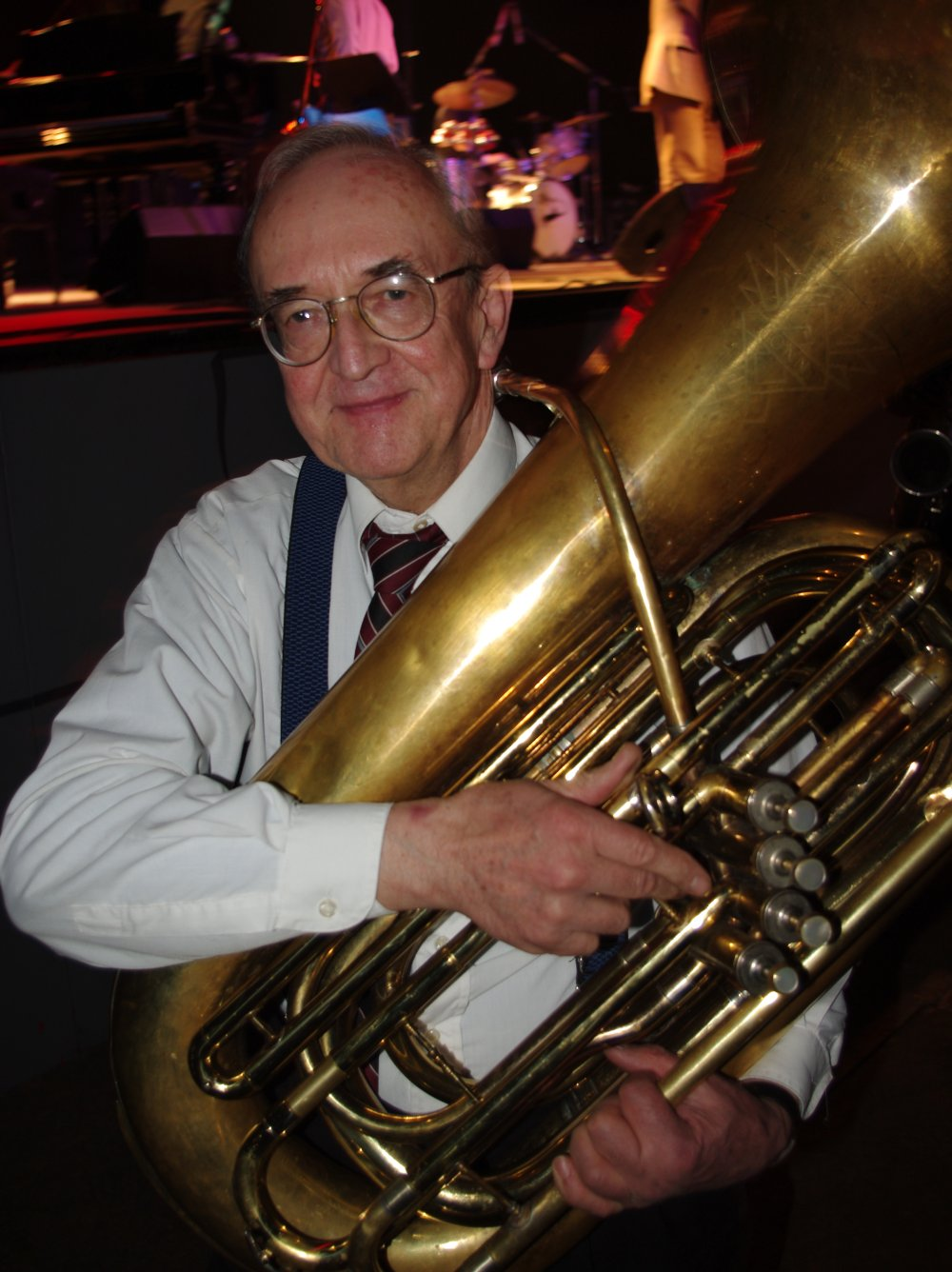
Polish jazz tuba player Andrzej Jastrzebski

In 1983, along with jazz pianist Mieczysławem Mazurem, he founded the Ragtime Duo. This cooperation lasted until late 1987 and 1988. Then in 1989-1992 he joined the Warsaw Snajpers.
