= Afro Futuristic Dreams =

Studio album by Idris Ackamoor and the Pyramids
- Released: September 22, 2023
- Studio: Quatermass
- Length: 68:02
- Label: Strut

Idris Ackamoor and the Pyramids chronology
Shaman! (2020)	Afro Futuristic Dreams (2023)

Afro Futuristic Dreams is a studio album by American musician Idris Ackamoor and his band the Pyramids. It was released on September 22, 2023, by Strut Records.

== Background ==
The album was recorded between San Francisco and London by British record producer Malcolm Catto at his Quatermass Studios.

== Critical reception ==
Professional ratings
Aggregate scores
Source	Rating
Metacritic	84/100
Review scores
Source	Rating
AllMusic	4.5/5 stars
All About Jazz	4/5 stars

Afro Futuristic Dreams was met with "universal acclaim" reviews from critics. At Metacritic, which assigns a weighted average rating out of 100 to reviews from mainstream publications, this release received an average score of 84, based on 5 reviews.

=== Accolades ===
Publications' year-end list appearances for Afro Futuristic Dreams
Critic/Publication	List	Rank	Ref
Passion of the Weiss	Passion of the Weiss' Best Albums of 2023	43	

== Track listing ==
Afro Futuristic Dreams track listing
No.	Title	Length
1.	"Afro Futuristic Dreams"	5:29
2.	"Thank You God"	13:20
3.	"Police Dem"	9:02
4.	"First Peoples"	6:55
5.	"Truth to Power"	7:21
6.	"Re-Memory"	5:33
7.	"Garland Rose"	6:46
8.	"Requiem for the Ancestors"	6:36
9.	"Nice It Up"	7:35
Total length:		68:08
