= Francesc Burrull =

Spanish composer and musician (1934–2021)

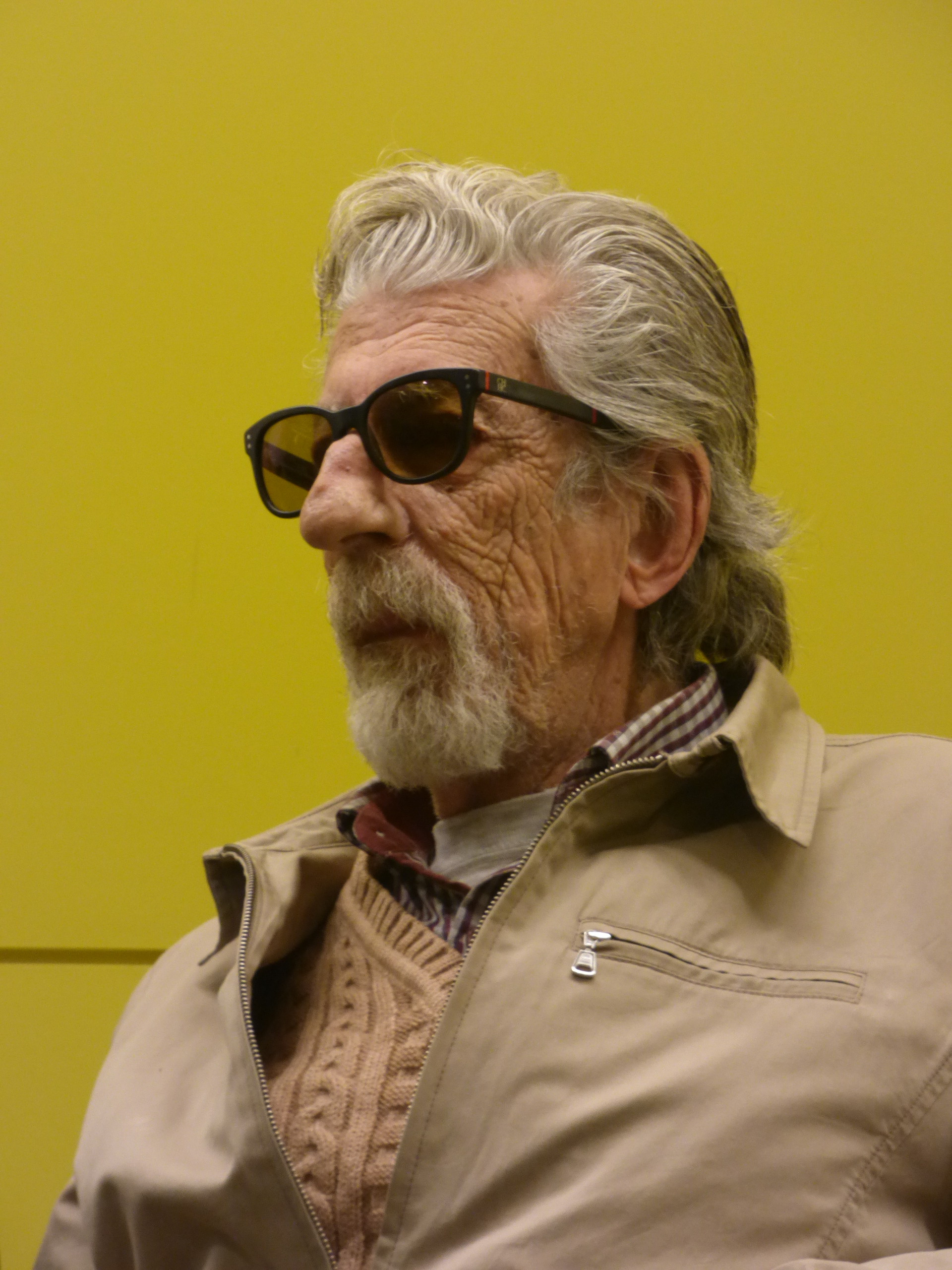
- Burrull in 2018

Background information
- Born: Francesc Burrull i Ill; October 18, 1934; Barcelona, Spanish Republic
- Died: August 28, 2021 (aged 86) Sant Pere de Ribes, Spain
- Genre: Jazz
- Occupations: Composer, pianist
- Instrument: Piano

Francesc Burrull (October 18, 1934 – August 28, 2021) was a Spanish jazz musician and composer. In 2017, he was awarded the Creu de Sant Jordi.

== Early life and education ==
Burrull studied at the Superior Conservatory of Music of the Gran Teatro del Liceo in Barcelona. His teacher was Pere Vallribera i Moliné. After completing his career in music and piano, he began to be noticed in the music scene of Barcelona, which had a large and active jazz scene.

== Artistic career ==
Burrull performed alongside names of the first rank, such as Sidney Bechet, Bill Coleman (trumpeter), Chet Baker, Don Byas, and Jean-Luc Ponty. He also appeared as vibraphonist on two of the albums of Tete Montoliu.

In 1992, he received the Premio Nacional de Música de Cataluña, in the category of Jazz, from the Generalitat de Catalunya, recognizing his achievements in music.

== Death ==
Burrull died on August 28, 2021, at 86 years old, due to a kidney disease.

== Partial discography ==
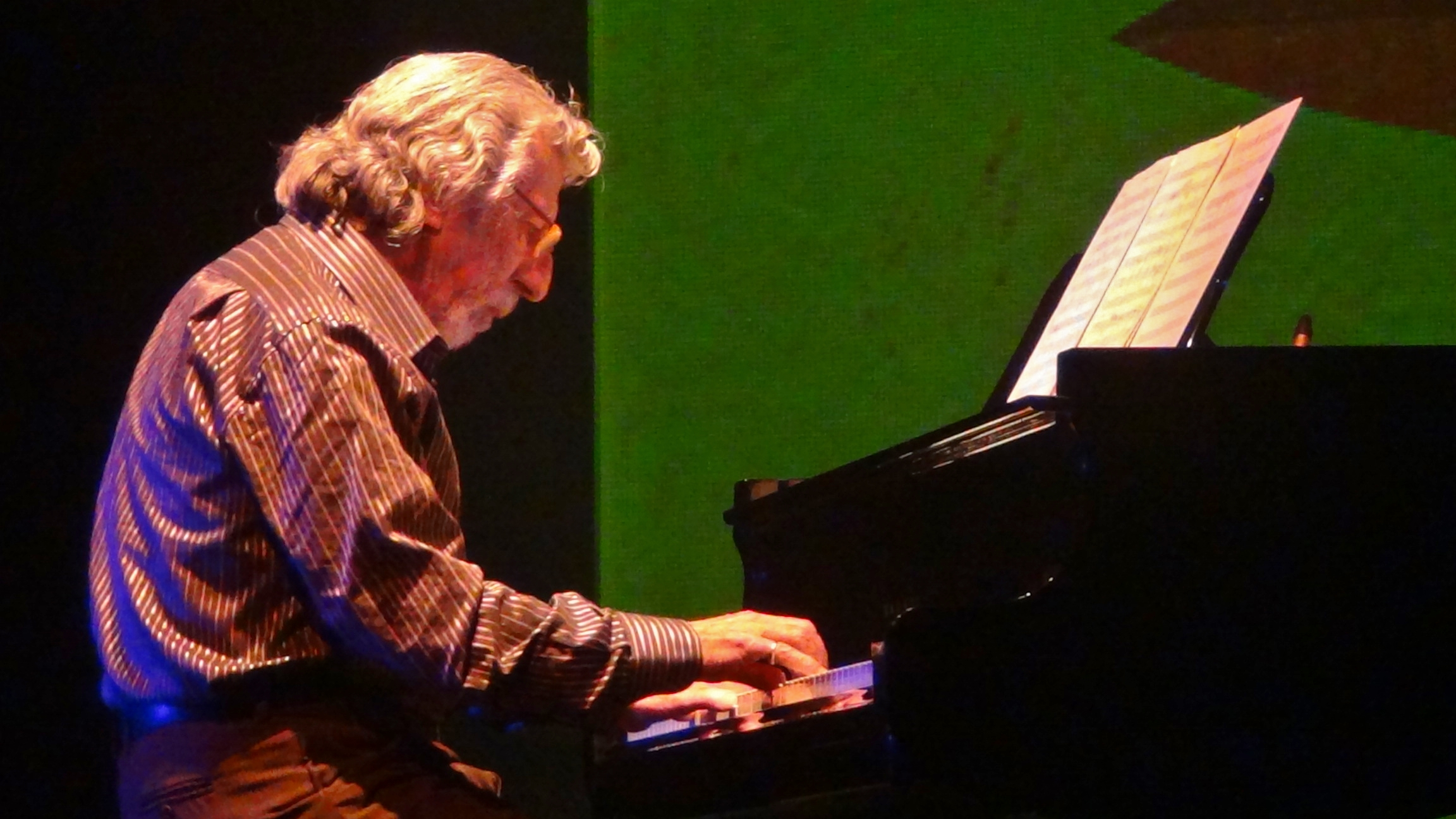
Burrull at the piano, 2012

- Fantasía musical thailandesa, EP con la Orquesta Montoliu (1962)
- Negro Spirituals (1971)
- Miguel Hernández (1972) con Joan Manuel Serrat
- Recordando a Duke Ellington (1974)
- Diálogos con Joan Baptista Humet (1975)
- Manuel de Falla avui (con Leonora Milà: piano; Albert Moraleda: bajo y contrabajo; Miguel Ángel Lizandra: batería). Catalonia Concerts Jazz (1976)
- Sinceritat..., con Ricard Roda (1995)
- No son... boleros, con La Voss del Trópico (1996)
- Blanc i negre (1997), piano solo
- Un poema de amor, con La Voss del Trópico (1999)
- Passeig de Gràcia, grabado con su trío: Llorenç Ametller: bajo; Quim Soler: batería; Francesc Burrull: piano
- Barcelona Jazz, grabado con su trío de jazz.
- Laura Simó & Francesc Burrull interpreten Serrat (2007)
- Temps de pluja (2010), un segundo conjunto de versiones de canciones de Joan Manuel Serrat acompañando a Laura Simó.
