= Connie Han =

Pianist, Composer, and Arranger

- Born: February 4, 1996 (age 30); Los Angeles, California, US
- Genres: Jazz
- Occupations: Musician, composer
- Instrument: Piano
- Label: Mack Avenue
- Website: www.conniehan.com

Connie Han (born 4 February 1996) is an American composer and pianist in the jazz, 20th-century classical, and experimental music idioms. She has recorded three albums as a leader for Mack Avenue Records.

== Early life ==
Han was born in Los Angeles, California, to Chinese parents, both of whom were professional musicians. She was taught piano from the age of five, initially by her mother. She became interested in jazz in high school, where she was taught by drummer Bill Wysaske. Han opted not to study music in college, and became a professional musician at the age of 17, with Wysaske as her trio's musical director.

== Later life and career ==
Wysaske produced Han's debut album, The Richard Rodgers Songbook, which was self-released in 2015. She subsequently signed to Mack Avenue Records, which released her Crime Zone in 2018. Han wrote seven of the album's ten tracks. The album included Wysaske and Edwin Livingston (bass) and the guest musicians Walter Smith III (saxophone) and Brian Swartz (trumpet). The title track is inspired by films such as Blade Runner and the anime movie Akira. A New York Times reviewer at the time praised her technique and knowledge of the history of the music.

In 2019, Han was named a Steinway Artist. In the same year, Jazzizz wrote that her original compositions from Crime Zone "were firmly stamped with her own artistic vision, and it's a vision that she will certainly continue to expand through 2019 and beyond."

== Composing and playing style ==
The DownBeat reviewer of Crime Zone described Han's compositions on the album as having "angular melodies and odd, abruptly shifting meters".

The DownBeat reviewer of Iron Starlet wrote that, compared with Han's piano playing on the album, on Fender Rhodes "her approach to the music shifts considerably. The emphasis turns to repeating melodic phrases and finding the right glassy tones to apply".

== Discography ==
Year recorded	Year released	Title	Label	Notes
	2015	The Richard Rodgers Songbook	Self-released	with Chris Colangelo (bass), Bill Wysaske (drums)
	2018	Crime Zone	Mack Avenue	Some tracks trio, with Edwin Livingston (bass), Bill Wysaske (drums); some tracks quartet, with Walter Smith III (tenor sax) added; one track quintet, with Brian Swartz (trumpet) added; one track solo piano
2019	2020	Iron Starlet	Mack Avenue	Quintet, with Walter Smith III (tenor sax), Jeremy Pelt (trumpet), Ivan Taylor (bass), Bill Wysaske (drums)
	2022	Secrets of Inanna	Mack Avenue	Quintet with Bill Wysaske (drums), John Patitucci (bass, acoustic), Rich Perry (tenor sax), Katisse Buckingham (flute)
