= Meghan Stabile =

American jazz promoter (1982–2022)

Meghan Erin Stabile
- Born: July 26, 1982; Corpus Christi, Texas, U.S.
- Died: June 12, 2022 (aged 39) Valrico, Florida, U.S.
- Genres: Jazz, Hip hop
- Occupations: Jazz promoter, producer, organizer and CEO
- Years active: 2006–2022
- Website: Revive Music

Meghan Erin Stabile (July 26, 1982 – June 12, 2022) was an American jazz promoter, producer and organizer who was described by The New York Times in a 2013 profile as a "modern Impresario".

She was the founder and chief executive officer of Revive Music Group, a New York-based jazz promotion and strategy company.

She organized shows and concerts to promote black American music.

== Early life ==
Meghan Stabile was born on July 26, 1982, in Corpus Christi, Texas. She grew up in Dover, New Hampshire, and was raised by her grandmother and an aunt.

She never met her father and was estranged from her mother, Gina Marie Skidds, who died in 2021.

In an interview with John Leland of the New York Times in 2013, she said she was expelled from three high schools and a middle school

She attended Berklee College of Music in Boston, learning how to play a guitar and singing. While studying there, she worked as a bartender at Wally's Cafe jazz club in the South end of Boston. This enabled her to meet with younger and older musicians and to take an interest in their music. This led her to change her studies from training as a guitarist and singer to music business management.

== Career ==
Meghan Stabile founded Revive Music while she was a student at Berklee College of Music. Her mission was to promote an underrecognized group of jazz musicians, specifically those who tackled hip-hop-influenced jazz. She abandoned her studies before completing her degree and moved to New York in September 2006 where she organized shows to promote jazz and hip hop musicians. She arranged collaborations between musicians including vibraphonist Roy Ayers and rapper Pete Rock, as well as Mos Def and the Robert Glasper Experiment. She worked with keyboardists Robert Glasper and Ray Angry; harpist Brandee Younger; saxophonists Pharoah Sanders, Ravi Coltrane, and Marcus Strickland; and drummers Otis Brown III and Chris Dave. Through her leadership, the Revive Big Band was formed in 2010 and has worked with artists such as tap dancer Savion Glover, singer/rapper Lauryn Hill, trumpet player Nicholas Payton, singer/rapper Talib Kweli and many others.

She also provided a venue for musical exploration with the Revive Da Live concert series. In addition, she promoted emerging talent in Revive's online publication, The Revivalist. She organized concerts in which artists mixed new and old musical styles, adding hip-hop's beats and lyrics to classic jazz clips.

In 2013, she created an annual showcase for Revive artists at New York's Winter JazzFest. Her efforts paid off and Don Was, president of Blue Note Records took notice and soon thereafter he signed her to a contract with the label as a producer and curator.

She organized the 2015 compilation album "Revive Music Presents: Supreme Sonacy (Vol. 1)" through Blue Note Records.

The Revivalist website which she set up in 2010 is one of leading platforms for promoting jazz music.

When Covid-19 hit in 2020, she was unable to book live performances and as result, "Revive Yo Feelings" was among her last productions.

== Death ==
Meghan Stabile died in Valrico, Florida, on June 12, 2022, aged 39. The cause of death was suicide.

She is survived by her maternal grandmother, Maureen Stabile, her sister, Caitlin Chaloux, and her brother, Michael Skidds.
