= Domi and JD Beck =

French-American jazz duo

Domi & JD Beck
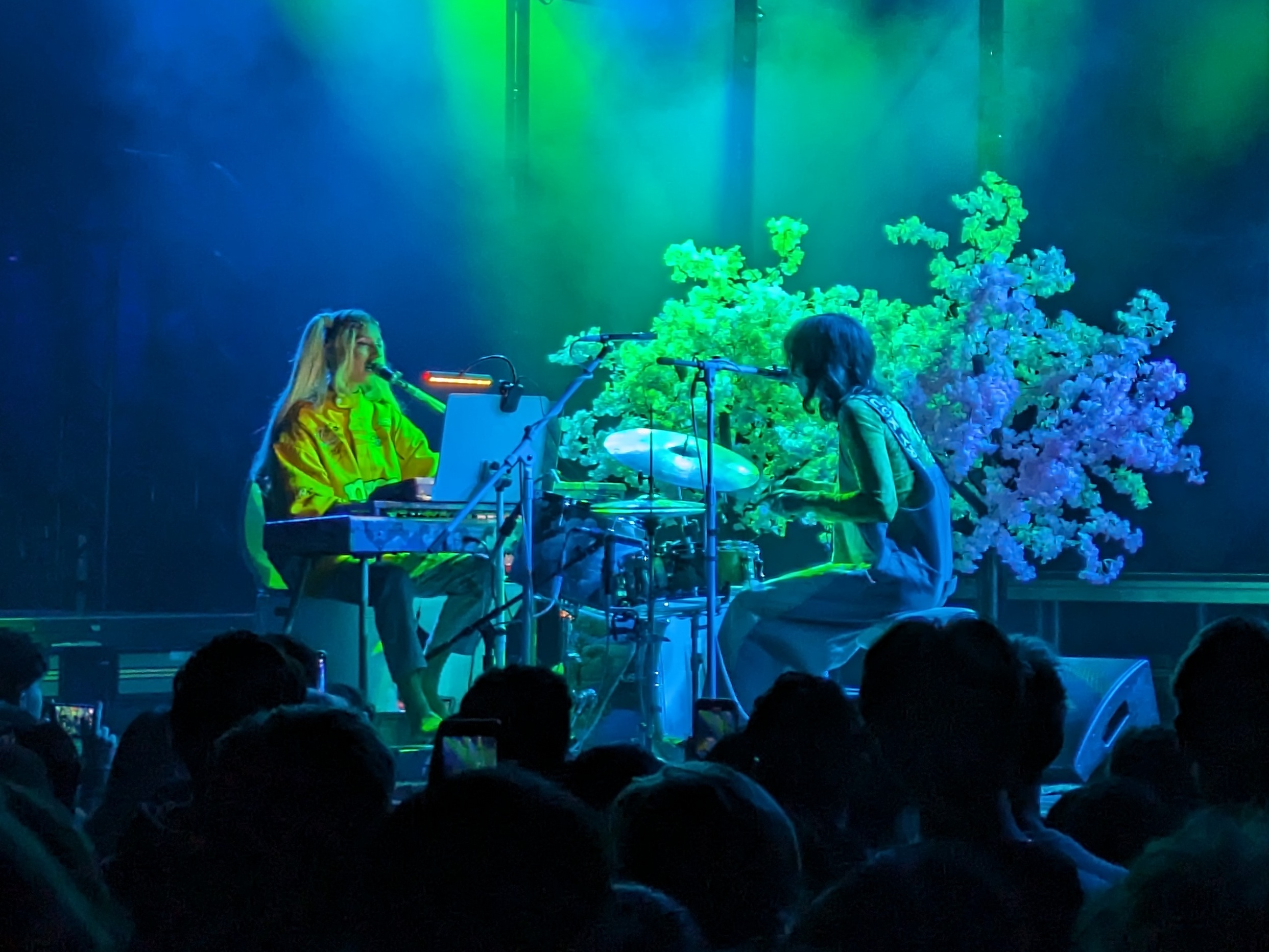
- DOMi & JD BECK performing in 2023

Background information
- Origin: Dallas, Texas, U.S.
- Genres: Jazz; instrumental hip hop; drum and bass
- Years active: 2018–present
- Labels: Blue Note; Apeshit
- Members: Domi; JD Beck
- Website: domiandjdbeck.com

Domi and JD Beck (stylized as DOMi & JD BECK) are a jazz duo consisting of French keyboardist Domi Louna and American drummer JD Beck. The two met in 2018 and have since worked with Thundercat, Anderson .Paak, Herbie Hancock, Eric Andre, Ariana Grande, Earl Sweatshirt, Bruno Mars, Kim Namjoon, and many more. They released their first single, "Smile", and debut album, Not Tight, as a duo in 2022. They received two Grammy Award nominations in 2022, for Best New Artist and Best Contemporary Instrumental Album for Not Tight. In July 2026, they released their second album, "Who Asked?".

== Background ==
Domi Louna (born Domitille Degalle) is originally from France and began playing piano, keyboard, and drums at age 3. She was enrolled in the Conservatoire de Nancy at age five to study jazz and classical music, and later studied at both the Conservatoire de Paris and the Berklee College of Music in Boston, Massachusetts after moving to the United States. Her videos performing original works later gained the notice of several prominent jazz and hip-hop musicians, such as Anderson .Paak, Louis Cole, and Thundercat, who have worked with her in several music projects and performances.

JD Beck grew up near Dallas, Texas. He began playing piano at age 5 and switched to drums at age 9. At around 10, he began playing gigs with and receiving mentorship from Cleon Edwards (of Erykah Badu's band), Robert "Sput" Searight (of Snarky Puppy), and soul musician Jon Bap. In 2021, he began playing in Mac DeMarco's touring band.

Both Domi Louna and JD Beck have been described as child prodigies.

== Career ==
Domi and JD Beck first met at the 2018 NAMM Show, kept in contact and met again a month later at Erykah Badu's birthday party. They then started playing and writing music together. In 2019, they appeared as backing musicians for acts like Thundercat and Anderson .Paak, and toured with progressive rock band Chon. The duo began receiving attention after posting videos of their performances online. In November 2020, they appeared live alongside Thundercat and Ariana Grande at the virtual Adult Swim Festival playing Thundercat's "Them Changes". In 2021, Domi and JD Beck co-wrote the song "Skate" by the Anderson .Paak and Bruno Mars collaboration, Silk Sonic.

In April 2022, Domi and JD Beck released "Smile", the first single from their debut album after signing with Anderson .Paak's label Apeshit partnering with Blue Note Records. On July 18, 2022, the duo appeared on Jimmy Kimmel Live! to perform their single "Take a Chance" with Anderson .Paak. On July 29, 2022, the duo released their debut studio album, Not Tight. The album features Thundercat, Mac Demarco, Anderson .Paak, Herbie Hancock, Snoop Dogg, Busta Rhymes, and Kurt Rosenwinkel. Not Tight was met with critical acclaim. At Metacritic, the album received an average score of 82, based on 5 reviews. The album has been nominated for the Grammy Award for Best Contemporary Instrumental Album and they were nominated for the Grammy Award for Best New Artist.

On August 10, 2022, the duo performed an NPR Tiny Desk Concert. On November 30, the duo performed their track "Two Shrimps" alongside Mac DeMarco on The Tonight Show Starring Jimmy Fallon.

== Discography ==
- Not Tight (2022)
- WHO ASKED? (2026)
- YOU ASKED! (2026)
