= Photay =

American electronic musician and producer

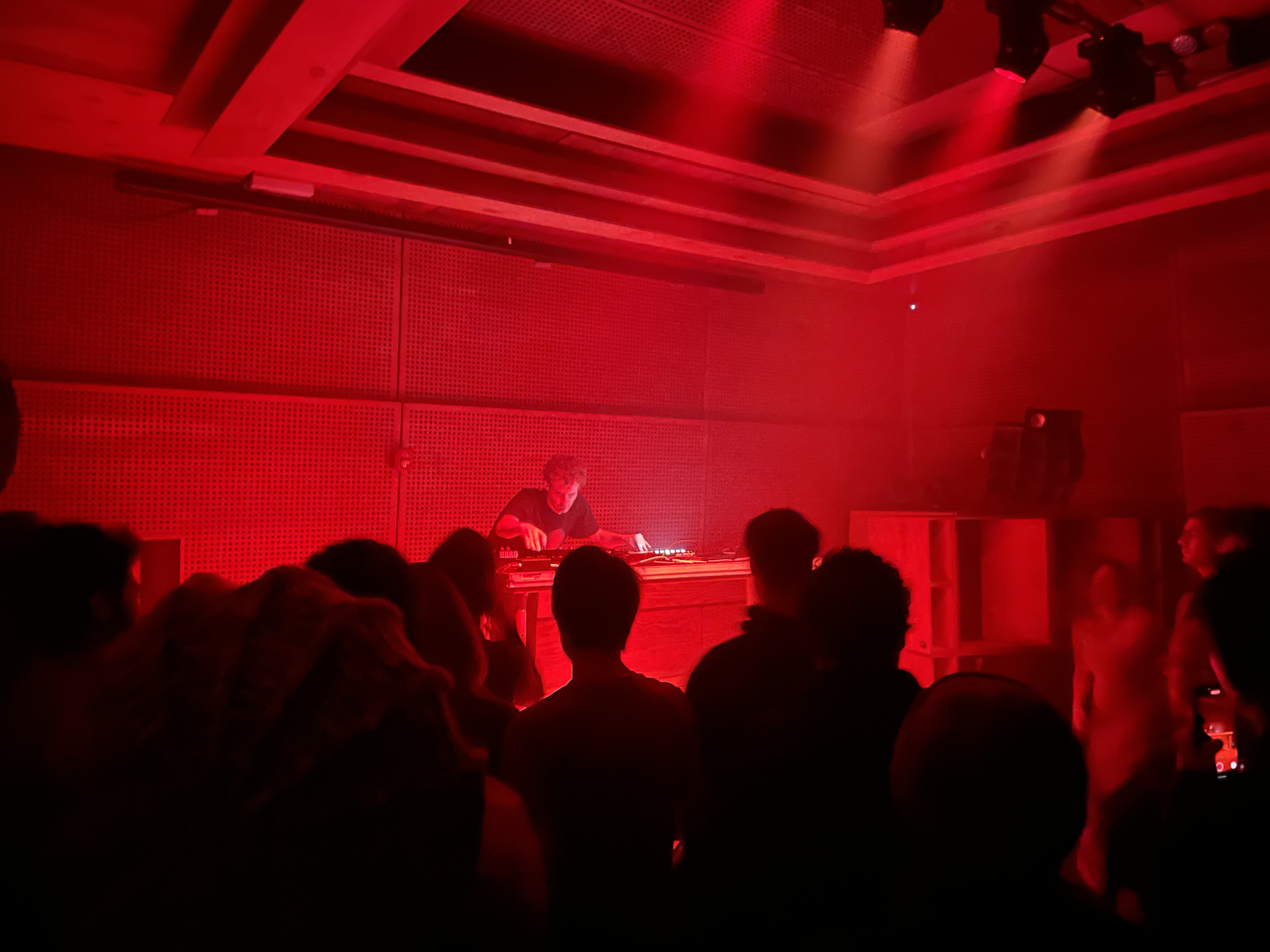
- Photay at Public Records, NYC – 2026

Background information
- Born: Evan Shornstein
- Genres: Electronic; experimental; ambient; house
- Occupations: Producer; drummer; DJ
- Years active: 2012–present
- Labels: Astro Nautico; Mexican Summer; International Anthem; Extravagant Frequencies; Multi Culti; Copyright Control
- Member of: Carlos Niño & Friends; Ensemble Entendu
- Website: https://photay.net/

Evan Shornstein, also known as Photay, is an American composer, drummer, DJ, and producer from Woodstock, New York, United States.

== Music ==
While a student at Purchase College, Shornstein took a trip to Guinea to study drumming, where he shortly released his debut album 1st in 2012. The influence of this exposure led to the creation of an EP, released as Photay in 2014 on the label Astro Nautico. He released several remixes for the Ninja Tune label soon after.

A full-length album, Onism, followed in 2017 on Astro Nautico. In 2020, a sophomore full-length, Waking Hours, arrived on the label Mexican Summer, and in 2022, he released On Hold, a record stitched together from samples of telephone hold music. In 2024, Photay released a new album, Windswept, on Mexican Summer. Windswept explores natural phenomena, notably "wind". Following the release of Windswept, its expanded album Windswept: Expansions was released in 2025, featuring two additional tracks "Jet Stream" and "Aeolian", and a remix of the album's track "Air Lock", titled "Air Lock (Air Tight Mix)".

Shornstein collaborates on a musical project titled "Ensemble Entendu" with musician Sam O.B.

== Personal life ==
As of 2025 he is in a relationship with composer Celia Hollander. Their house in Altadena burned down in the 2025 Eaton Fire.

== Discography ==
=== As Photay ===
==== Albums ====
Title	Details
1st	Released: November 30, 2012; Label: Self-released
Onism	Featuring: Madison McFerrin; Released: August 11, 2017; Label: Astro Nautico
On Hold	Released: March 16, 2020 (Note: This date is from the Bandcamp release of On Hold and a few other platforms such as YouTube and Discogs. On the other hand, Photay has released On Hold in Spotify a year later on March 5, 2021. "Roaming" is labeled with the year "2021" for this reason, since it's a Spotify-exclusive single.); Label: Mexican Summer
Waking Hours	Released: June 12, 2020; Label: Mexican Summer
An Offering (with Carlos Niño & Friends)	Featuring: Randal Fisher, Mikaela Davis, lasos; Released: October 1, 2021; Label: International Anthem
More Offerings (with Carlos Niño & Friends)	Featuring: Randal Fisher, Laraaji, Mia Doi Todd, lasos, Club Diego; Released: December 9, 2022; Label: International Anthem
Windswept	Released: September 20, 2024; Label: Mexican Summer
Windswept: Expansions	Released: March 28, 2025; Label: Mexican Summer

==== EPs ====
- Photay (Astro Nautico, 2014)
- Sadie (Astro Nautico, 2016)
- Onism: Remixed (Astro Nautico, 2018)
- Waking Hours: Remixed (Mexican Summer, 2020)
- Always Cosmic (Multi Culti & Copyright Control, 2026)

==== Singles ====
- "Outré Lux (feat. Madison McFerrin)" (Astro Nautico, 2017)
- "The People" (Mexican Summer, 2020)
- "Is It Right?" (Mexican Summer, 2020)
- "Quest of the Pseudacris" (Mexican Summer, 2020)
- "Villain (feat. golda may)" (Mexican Summer, 2021)
- "Roaming" (Mexican Summer, 2021)
- "Derecho" (Mexican Summer, 2024)
- "Air Lock" (Mexican Summer, 2024)
- "Air Lock (Air Tight Mix)" (Mexican Summer, 2024)
- "Jet Stream" (Mexican Summer, 2025)
- "Aeolian" (Mexican Summer, 2025)
- "Land of Make Believe" (Mexican Summer, 2026)

==== Guest appearances ====
- "No Sass" on Nova - Haute musique II (Nova Records, 2017)
- "Ode to the Pleiades (Photay Remix)" by Clap! Clap! on Black Acre: Once Around the Sun 2018 (Black Acre Records, 2018)
- "Forest Pulse" (with Laraaji, Photay) on Bliss On Dear Oneness by Carlos Niño & Friends (Leaving Records, 2019)
- "Sea Urchin" on Atlantics X (Astro Nautico, 2020)
- "Monday" on Nova le grand mix 2015 (Nova Records, 2023)
- "Continuum Part 1–3" (with Stuart Bogie, Photay) & "Continuum Part 4 - The Slow Fawn Rises" (with Stuart Bogie, Photay) (featuring Hannah Cohen) on Slow Fawn Music No. 2 by Sam Cohen (Slow Fawn Music, 2025)
- "Light Beam Extended" (with Cochemea, Photay) by Sam Cohen (30th Century Records, 2025)

==== Remixes ====
- "Em Bora (Photay Remix)" on Long Ways Off Remixes by Matas (Outlier Recordings, 2014)
- "Can't Forget (Photay Remix)" on The Meaning by Rights (Infinite Machine, 2015)
- "Bismillah (Photay Remix)" on Day To Day Remixes by Sarathy Korwar (Ninja Tune, 2016)
- "In Stone (Photay Remix)" on In Stone Remixes by BASECAMP (OWSLA, 2016)
- "Season 2 Episode 3 (Photay Remix)" by Glass Animals (Wolf Tone Limited, 2016)
- "Sorceress (Photay Remix)" by Jordan Rakei (Ninja Tune, 2017)
- "Balance (Photay Equilibrium Dub Mix)" on Positive Noise (The Remixes) by Sam O.B. (LuckyMe, 2017)
- "Get Lost (Photay Remix)" on Get Lost (Remixes) by D-Pulse (Downtown & Interscope Records, 2017)
- "Ode to the Pleiades (Photay Remix)" by Clap! Clap! (Black Acre, 2018)
- "Ocean Flow Zither (Photay Remix)" on Sun Transformations by Laraaji (All Saints Records, 2018)
- "Cham Bomb (Photay Remix)" on Super Liminal (Remixed) by Penya (On The Corner Records, 2018)
- "Rain Makes The River (Photay Remix)" on Rain Makes The River (Remixes) by Jazzanova (Sonar Kollektiv, 2019)
- "Gold Rush (Photay Remix)" by Death Cab for Cutie (Atlantic Records, 2018)
- "Falls (Photay Remix) [Radio Edit]" on Falls Remixes (featuring Sasha Alex Sloan) by ODESZA (Self-released, 2018)
- "Checkpoint Charlie (Photay Remix)" by Ghost Against Ghost (Our Silent Canvas, 2019)
- "Learn Your Lesson (Photay Remix)" on Finding Foudations: THE REMIXES by Madison McFerrin (Self-released, 2019)
- "The Workers of Art (Photay Remix)" on To Believe (Remixes) by The Cinematic Orchestra (Ninja Tune, 2020)
- "All the Way Round (Photay Remix)" on All the Ways Round by Kelpe (DRUT Recordings, 2020)
- "MMXX — XII (Photay Remix)" (featuring Rhye) on MMXX (Remixes) by Diplo (Higher Ground, 2021)
- "Love is Loving (Photay Remix)" (featuring Omar, XANA, Faye Houston) by Scrimshire (Self-released, 2021)
- "Blue to Red (Photay Remix)" & "Blue to Red (Photay No Drums Remix)" on Blue to Red Remixed by Chip Wickham (Lovemonk, 2021)
- "All That I Need (Photay Remix)", "All That I Need (Photay Lullaby Remix)" & "All That I Need (Photay Remix Radio Edit)" (featuring Sharin) on Conclave (The Remixes) by Conclave (Love Injection, 2021)
- "Another Like This (Photay Remix)" (featuring Yazmin Lacey) by Steve Spacek (Boomerang Records, 2022)
- "ZEZE (Photay Version)" (with Msafiri Zawose, Penya) on ZEZE (Remixes) by WEMA (!K7 Music, 2022)
- "P U P I L (Photay's Tributary Mix)", "E X I S T E N C E (Photay's Infinite Mix)" & "E X I S T E N C E (Photay's Infinite Mix with Club Diego)" on More Offerings by Photay (with Carlos Niño) (International Anthem, 2022)
- "Naturally (Photay Remix)", "Naturally (Photay Remix) - Radio Edit" & "Naturally (Photay Remix) - Radio Edit Instrumental" on Naturally Remixes by Turn On The Sunlight (Plant Bass & Jesse Peterson, 2023)
- "Alma Del Mundo (Photay Remix)" by Phil Moffa (Love Injection Records, 2023)
- "Help (Photay Remix)" on Bonus Prize by Rozi Plain (Memphis Industries, 2023)
- "Always Open (Falle's Roots) - Photay Remix" by United Freedom Collective on Always Cosmic by Photay (Multi Culti & Copyright Control, 2026)
- "Loango Weaver (Photay Remix)" by Les Mamans du Congo (with RROBIN) (Shika Shika, 2026)
- "Indigo Dye (Photay Remix)" by Stavroz (Moodfamily, 2026)

=== As Ensemble Entendu ===
==== Albums ====
Title	Details
Selected Rhythm Works, Vol. 1	Released: November 18, 2016; Label: Astro Nautico

==== EPs ====
- Music for the Densely Populated, Vol. 2 (Astro Nautico, 2019)
- Pastoral Dark Themes, Vol. 3 (Astro Nautico, 2019)
- Reckless Mechanical Anthems, Vol. 4 (Extravagant Frequencies, 2025)

==== Singles ====
- "Time Is Certainly Passing" (Astro Nautico, 2018)
- "Azalea Chuva" (Astro Nautico, 2019)
- "Big Break" (Astro Nautico, 2019)
- "Hot Heads" (Extravagant Frequencies, 2025)

==== Remixes ====
- "The People (Ensemble Entendu Remix)" on Waking Hours: Remixed by Photay (Mexican Summer, 2020)

=== As Evan Shornstein ===
==== Albums ====
Title	Details
Frog Ragg (with Will Epstein)	Released: April 22, 2025; Label: Extravagant Frequencies
OOPS! (with Evan Shortstein)	By: Booker Stardrum; Released: June 5, 2026; Label: Sudden Quarterly

==== EPs ====
- Rafting / Tall Grass (with Booker Stardrum) (Extravagant Frequencies, 2025)
- Might Slip (with Will Epstein) (Extravagant Frequencies, 2025)
- Unexpected Music II (with Evan Shortstein) by Celia Hollander (Extravagant Frequencies, 2026)

==== Singles ====
- "VI" (with Will Epstein) (Extravagant Frequencies, 2025)
