= 1928 in jazz =

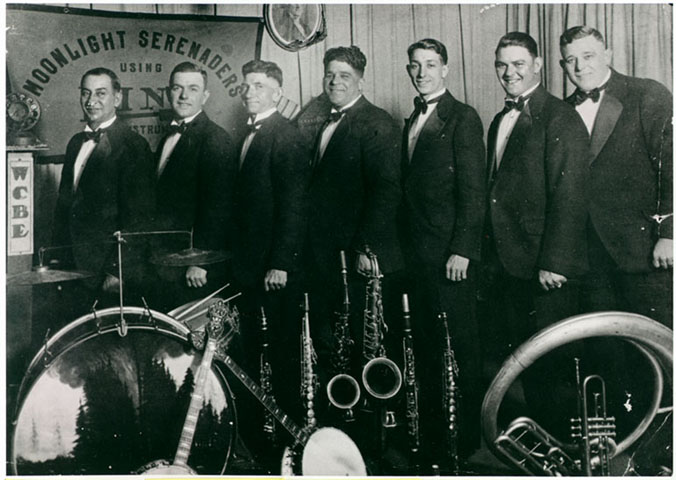
- The Moonlight Serenaders perform over WCBE New Orleans, late 1920s
- Decade: 1920s in jazz
- Music: 1928 in music
- Standards: List of 1920s jazz standards
- See also: 1927 in jazz – 1929 in jazz

This is a timeline documenting events of Jazz in the year 1928.

Musicians born that year included Cannonball Adderley, Etta Jones and Fats Domino.

== Events ==
- By 1928, jazz was becoming popular in Germany and was being taught in Frankfurt.

== Standards ==
- In 1928 the standards "Basin Street Blues", "Sweet Lorraine" and "Mack the Knife" were published.

== Deaths ==
June

- 24 – Jimmy O'Bryant, American jazz clarinetist (born 1896).

August

- 29 – Stump Evans, American jazz saxophonist (born 1904).

== Births ==
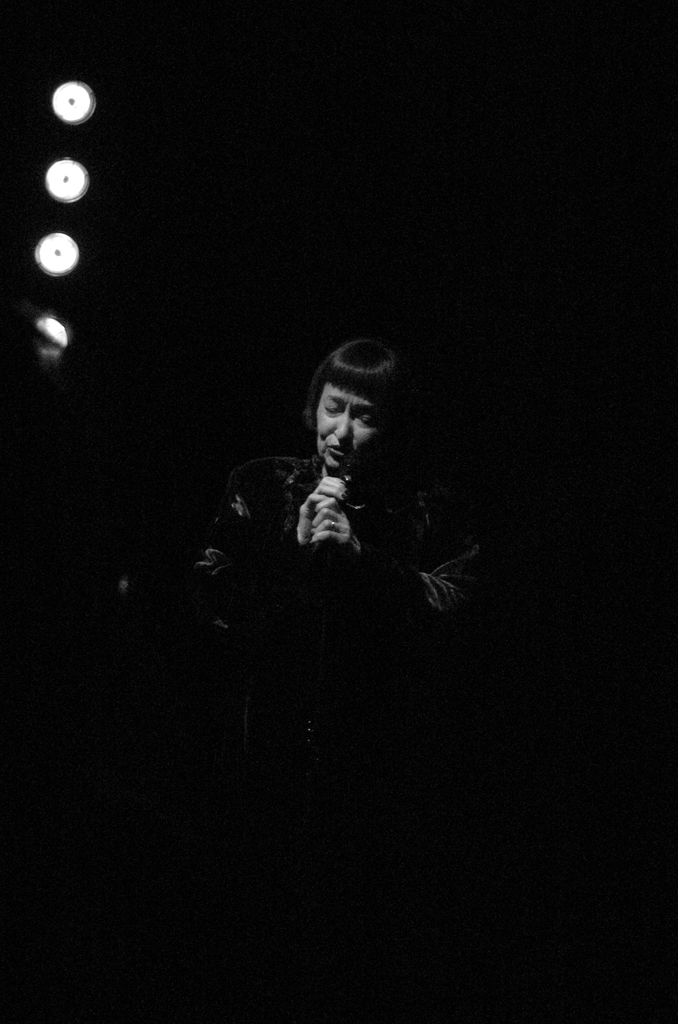
Sheila Jordan in Jerusalem, 2007

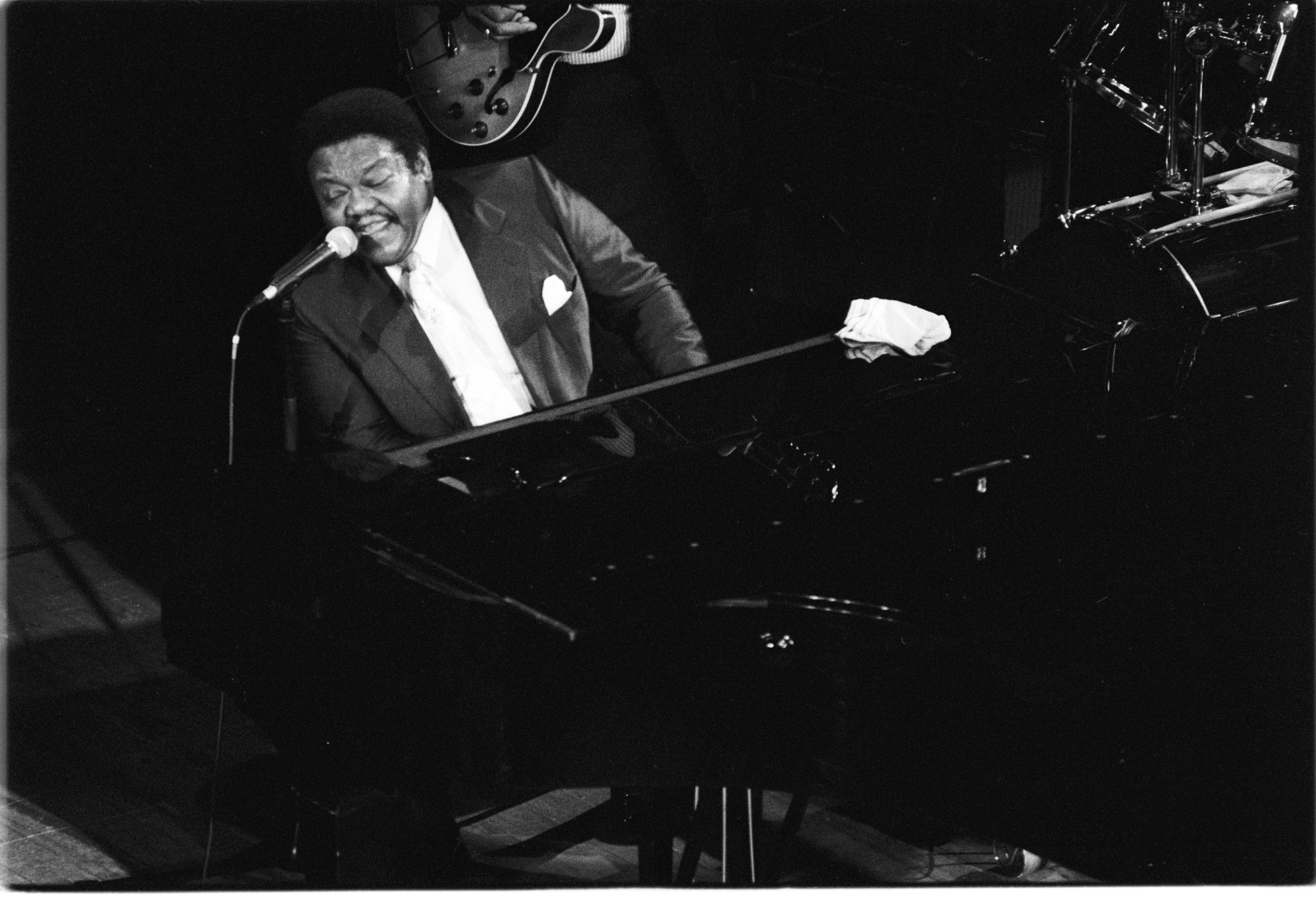
Fats Domino in concert at Deauville (Normandy, France) in 1992.

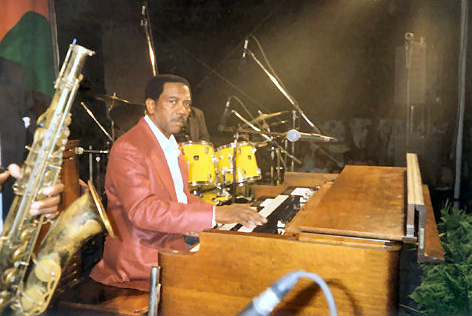
Jimmy Smith at Festival Jazz Sori – Italy, July 1994

January

- 3 – Al Belletto, American saxophonist and clarinetist (died 2014).
- 4 – Alan Littlejohn, British trumpeter (died 1996).
- 11 – Cal Massey, American trumpeter (died 1972).
- 12 – Ruth Brown, American singer-songwriter and actress (died 2006).
- 14 – Joe Muranyi, Hungarian-American clarinetist (died 2012).
- 15 – Werner Dies, German tenor saxophonist, clarinetist, guitarist, composer, and arranger (died 2003).
- 23 – Dave Black, American drummer (died 2006).
- 24 – Mick Mulligan, English trumpeter and bandleader (died 2006).
- 26 – Dick Nash, American trombonist.
- 29 – Beverly Kenney, American singer (died 1960).
- 31 – Keshav Sathe, Indian tabla player (died 2012).

February

- 6 – Nelson Boyd, American bassist (died 1985).
- 11 – Conrad Janis, American trombonist and actor (died 2022).
- 18 – Frank Butler, American drummer (died 1984).
- 25 – Mike Hennessey, English music journalist and pianist (died 2017).
- 26 – Fats Domino, American pianist and singer-songwriter (died 2017).

March

- 5
  - Lou Levy, American pianist (died 2001).
  - Wilbur Little, African-American bassist (died 1987).
- 9 – Keely Smith, American singer (died 2017).
- 12
  - Aldemaro Romero, Venezuelan pianist and composer (died 2007).
  - Paul Kuhn, German pianist, singer, and band leader (died 2013).
  - Willie Maiden, American saxophonist and arranger (died 1976).
- 15 – Bob Wilber, American clarinetist and saxophonist (died 2019).
- 31 – Archie Semple, Scottish clarinettist (died 1974).

April

- 3 – Bill Potts, American pianist (died 2005).
- 4 – Alfredo "Chocolate" Armenteros, Cuban trumpeter (died 2016).
- 6 – Eddie Hubble, American trombonist (died 2016).
- 8 – Derek Hogg, English drummer.
- 9 – Monty Sunshine, English clarinettist (died 2010).
- 10
  - Fraser MacPherson, Canadian saxophonist (died 1993).
  - Jerzy Matuszkiewicz, Polish saxophonist and composer (died 2021).
  - Marilyn Maye, American singer and actress.
- 13 – Teddy Charles, American vibraphonist, pianist, and drummer (died 2012).
- 14
  - Egil Monn-Iversen, composer and pianist (died 2017).
  - Norman Amadio, Canadian pianist and composer (died 2020).
- 18 – Ken Colyer, English trumpeter and cornetist (died 1988).
- 22 – Tommy Turrentine, American trumpeter (died 1997).
- 23 – Mike Daniels, British trumpeter and bandleader (died 2016).
- 24 – Johnny Griffin, American jazz saxophonist (heart attack) (died 2008).
- 25 – Rick Henderson, American saxophonist (died 2004).
- 26 – Herman Foster, American pianist (died 1999).
- 29 – Errol Buddle, Australian bassoonist and saxophonist (died 2018).

May

- 4
  - Lars Gullin, Swedish saxophonist (died 1976).
  - Maynard Ferguson, Canadian jazz trumpeter and bandleader (died 2006).
- 15 – Joe Gordon, American trumpeter (died 1963).
- 22 – Jackie Cain, American singer (died 2014).
- 24 – Max Bennett, American bassist, L.A. Express, The Wrecking Crew (died 2018).
- 26 – Jack Kevorkian, American musician and composer (died 2011).
- 29 – Freddie Redd, American pianist and composer (died 2021).
- 30 – Priscilla Bowman, American singer (died 1988).

June

- 1 – Frank Parr, English trombonist and cricketer (died 2012).
- 4 – Teddy Kotick, American bassist (died 1986).
- 11 – Bob Gordon, American saxophonist (died 1955).
- 12 – Vic Damone, American singer, songwriter, and actor (died 2018).
- 20 – Eric Dolphy, American alto saxophonist, flutist, and bass clarinetist (died 1964).
- 23 – Bob Badgley, American upright bassist (died 2012).
- 26 – Don Lanphere, American saxophonist (died 2003).

July

- 2 – Richard Wyands, American pianist, composer, and arranger (died 2019).
- 4 – Ted Joans, American trumpeter and jazz poet (died 2003).
- 13 – Leroy Vinnegar, American upright bassist (died 1999).
- 15 – Joe Harriott, Jamaican saxophonist and composer (died 1973).
- 17
  - Joe Morello, American drummer (died 2011).
  - Vince Guaraldi, American pianist (died 1976).
- 18 – Carl Fontana, American trombonist (died 2003).
- 20 – Peter Ind, British upright bassist and record producer (died 2021).
- 22 – Keter Betts, American upright bassist (died 2005).
- 29 – Konstantin Orbelyan, Armenian pianist, composer, and head of the State Estrada Orchestra of Armenia (died 2014).
- 30 – Vernel Fournier, American drummer (died 2000).

August

- 3 – Lyn Christie, Australian-born American-based bassist (died 2020).
- 8 – Don Burrows, Australian clarinetist, saxophonist and flautist (died 2020).
- 15 – Bobby Orr, Scottish drummer (died 2020).
- 16 – Carl Perkins, American pianist (died 1958).
- 21
  - Addison Farmer, American bassist (died 1963).
  - Art Farmer, American trumpeter (died 1999).
- 23 – Gil Coggins, American pianist (died 2004).
- 26 – Peter Appleyard, British–Canadian vibraphonist and percussionist (died 2016).
- 28 – Kenny Drew, American pianist (died 1993).

September

- 1 – Ed Summerlin, American composer, arranger, saxophonist, and music educator (died 2006).
- 2 – Horace Silver, American pianist and composer (died 2014).
- 5
  - Albert Mangelsdorff, German trombonist (died 2005).
  - Hal Stein, American saxophonist (died 2008).
- 11 – Lorraine Geller, American pianist (died 1958).
- 14 – Jay Cameron, American saxophonist (died 2001).
- 15 – Cannonball Adderley, American saxophonist (died 1975).
- 20 – Vi Redd, American alto saxophonist and singer (died 2022).
- 21 – William Russo, American trombonist, composer, and arranger (died 2003).
- 23
  - Frank Foster, American saxophonist and flautist (died 2011).
  - Michel Gaudry, French upright bassist (died 2019).
- 28 – Koko Taylor, American singer (died 2009).
- 30 – Jon Eardley, American trumpeter (died 1991).

October

- 10 – Junior Mance, American pianist and composer (died 2021).
- 22 – Clare Fischer, American keyboardist (died 2012).
- 28 – Ronaldo Bôscoli, Brazilian composer (died 1994).
- 30 – Bobby Jones, American saxophonist (died 1980).

November

- 2 – Herb Geller, American saxophonist (died 2013).
- 4 – Larry Bunker, American drummer and vibraphonist (died 2005).
- 11 – Ernestine Anderson, American singer (died 2016).
- 12 – Audrey Morris, American singer and pianist (died 2018).
- 13
  - Ernie Farrow, American pianist and multi-instrumentalist (died 1969).
  - Hampton Hawes, American pianist (died 1977).
- 15 – Seldon Powell, American saxophonist and flautist (died 1997).
- 17
  - Chuck Andrus, American upright bassist (died 1997).
  - John Sangster, Australian composer, arranger, drummer, cornettist, and vibraphonist (died 1995).
- 18 – Sheila Jordan, American singer and songwriter.
- 22 – John Brimhall, American pianist and musical arranger (died 2003).
- 25 – Etta Jones, American singer (died 2001).

December

- 4 – Frank Tiberi, American saxophonist.
- 5 – Gene Allen, American jazz reedist (died 2008).
- 6
  - Alan Abel, American percussionist (died 2020).
  - Frankie Dunlop, American drummer (died 2014).
- 8 – Jimmy Smith, American Hammond organist (died 2005).
- 18 – Harold Land, American saxophonist (died 2001)
- 28 – Moe Koffman, Canadian saxophonist and flautist (died 2001).
- 30 – Jack Montrose, American saxophonist (died 2006).
- 31 – Jerry van Rooyen, Dutch trumpeter, conductor, and composer (died 2009).

== Bibliography ==
- The New Real Book, Volume I. Sher Music. 1988. ISBN 0-9614701-4-3.
- The New Real Book, Volume II. Sher Music. 1991. ISBN 0-9614701-7-8.
- The New Real Book, Volume III. Sher Music. 1995. ISBN 1-883217-30-X.
- The Real Book, Volume I (6th ed.). Hal Leonard. 2004. ISBN 0-634-06038-4.
- The Real Book, Volume II (2nd ed.). Hal Leonard. 2007. ISBN 978-1-4234-2452-9.
- The Real Book, Volume III (2nd ed.). Hal Leonard. 2006. ISBN 0-634-06136-4.
- The Real Jazz Book. Warner Bros. ISBN 978-91-85041-36-7.
- The Real Vocal Book, Volume I. Hal Leonard. 2006. ISBN 0-634-06080-5.
