= 2012 in jazz =

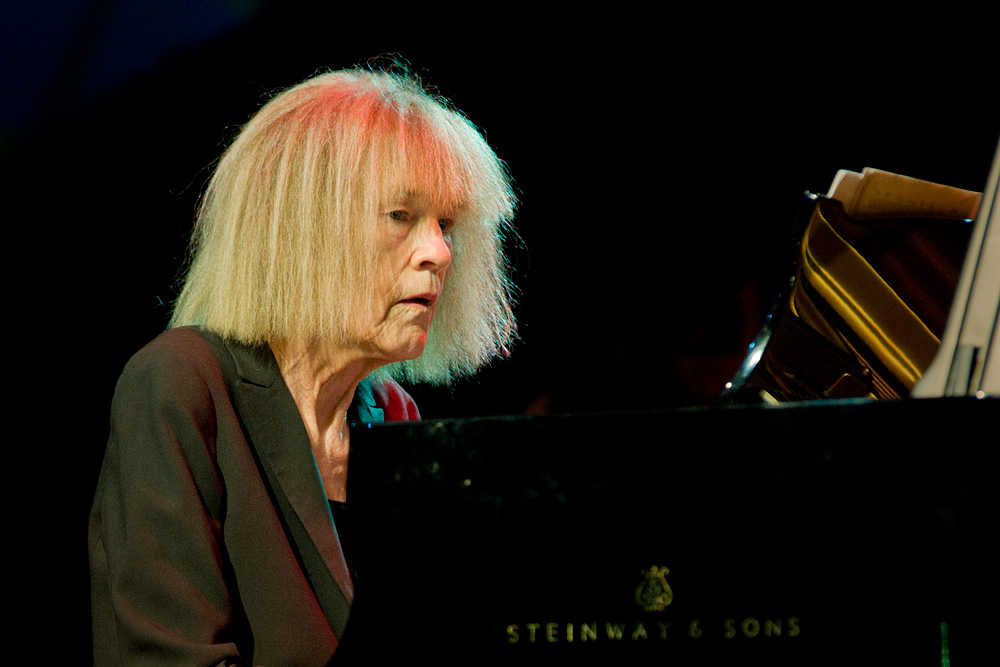
- Carla Bley, Moers Festival 2012.
- Decade: 2010s in jazz
- Music: 2012 in music
- Standards: List of jazz standards
- See also: 2011 in jazz – 2013 in jazz

This is a timeline documenting events of Jazz in the year 2012.

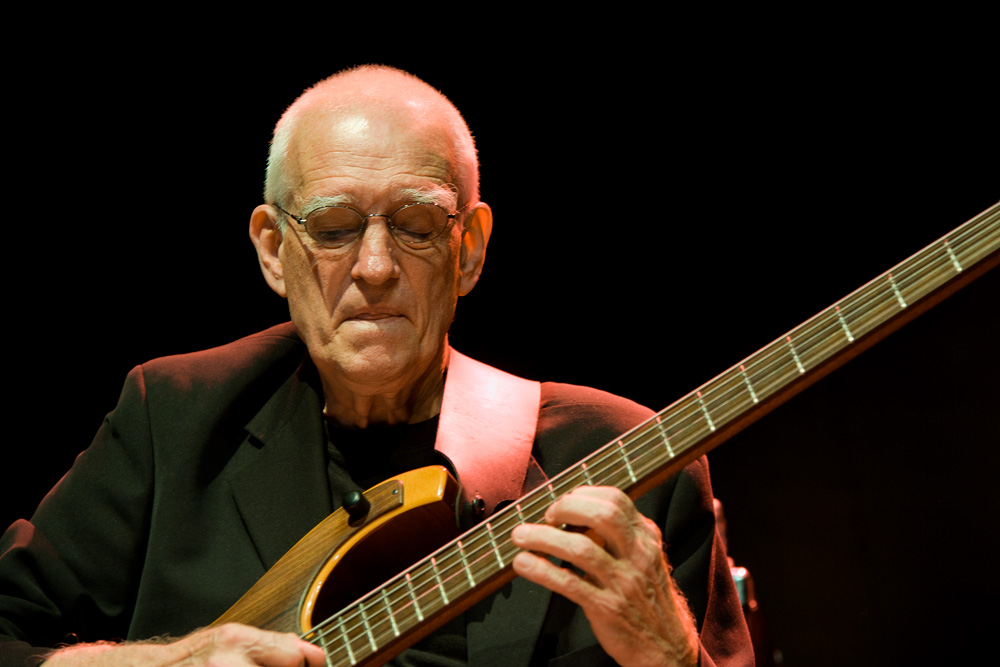
Steve Swallow at the Moers Festival 2012.

== Events ==
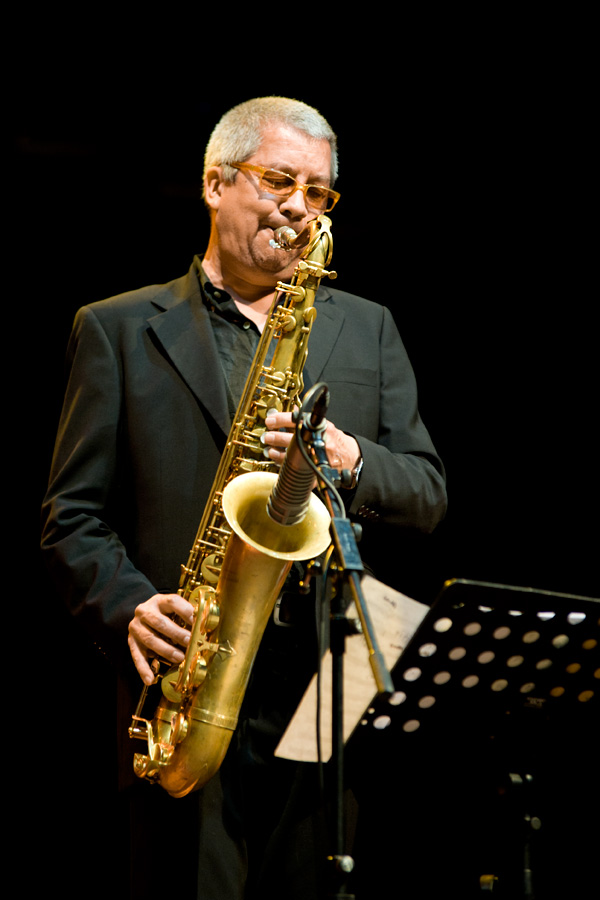
Andy Sheppard at the Moers Festival 2012.

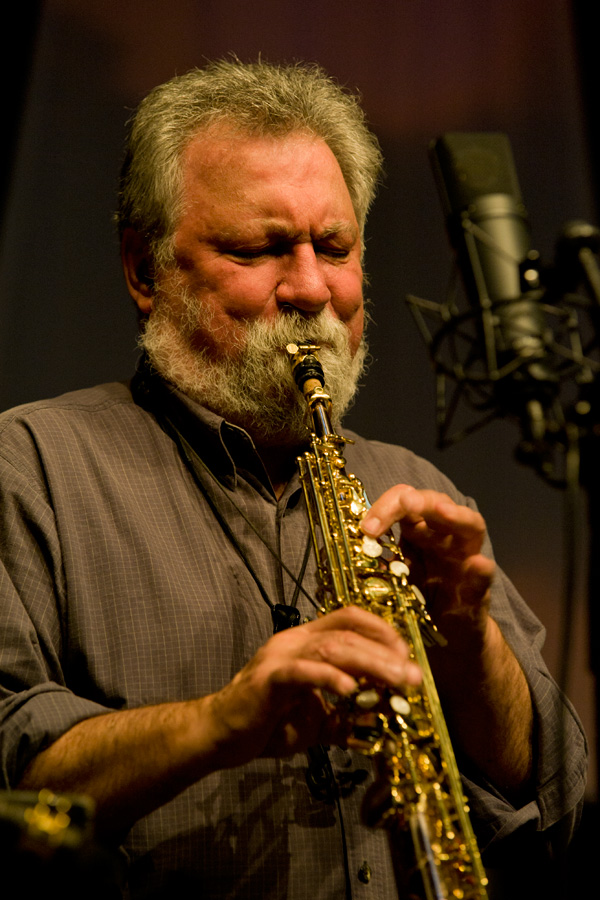
Evan Parker at the Moers Festival 2012.

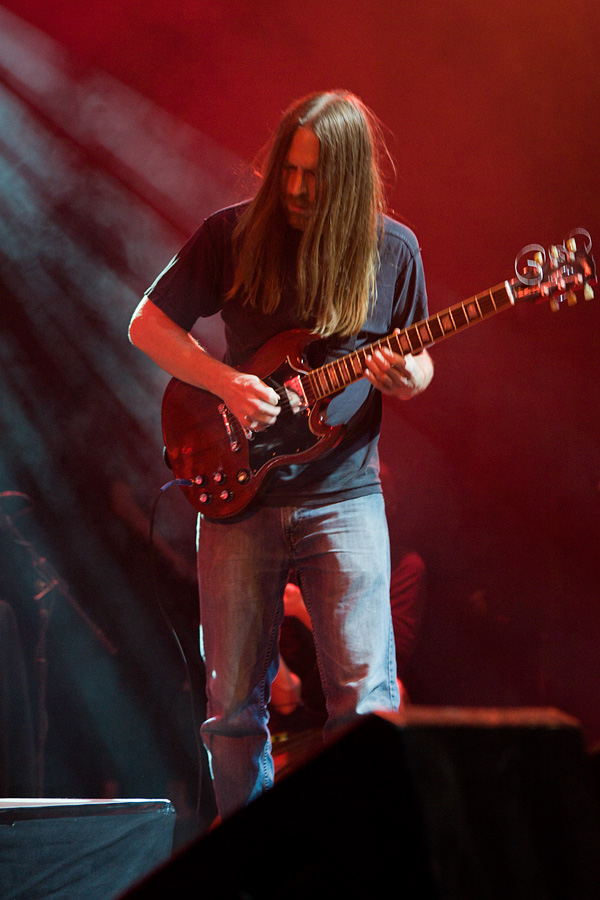
Mick Barr at the Moers Festival 2012.

=== January ===
- 25 – The very first Bodø Jazz Open started in Bodø, Norway (January 25–28).

=== February ===
- 3
  - April 30 is designated as International Jazz Day to celebrate Jazz music as a rich cultural heritage, a product of cultural collaboration and a universal language of tolerance and freedom, unanimously by the United Nations Educational, Scientific & Cultural Organization (UNESCO).
  - The 14th Polarjazz Festival started in Longyearbyen, Svalbard (February 1–5).
- 7 – The 7th Ice Music Festival started in Geilo, Norway (February 7 – 10).

=== March ===
- 2 – The 8th Jakarta International Java Jazz Festival started in Jakarta, Indonesia (March 2–4).
- 30 – The 39th Vossajazz started in Voss, Norway (March 30 - April 2).
- 31
  - Sigrid Moldestad was awarded Vossajazzprisen 2012.
  - Karl Seglem performs the commissioned work Som Spor at Vossajazz.

=== April ===
- 25 – The 18th SoddJazz started in Inderøy, Norway (April 25–29).
- 27 – The 1st Torino Jazz Festival started in Turin (April 27 – May 1).
- 30 – The International Jazz Day.

=== May ===
- 5 – The Norwegian trumpeter Mathias Eick Quintet was recipient of the 2012 BMW Welt Jazz Award in Germany.
- 23 – The 40th Nattjazz started in Bergen, Norway (May 23 – June 2)
- 25 – The 41st Moers Festival started in Moers, Germany (May 25 – 28).

=== June ===
- 17 – The 24th Jazz Fest Wien started in Vienna, Austria (June 17 – July 9).
- 28 – The 32nd Montreal International Jazz Festival started in Montreal, Quebec, Canada (June 28 - July 7).
- 29 – The 46th Montreux Jazz Festival started in Montreux, Switzerland (June 29 – July 14).

=== July ===
- 4 – The 48th Kongsberg Jazzfestival started at Kongsberg, Norway (July 4–7).
- 6
  - The 37th North Sea Jazz Festival started in The Hague, Netherlands (July 6 – 8).
  - The 34th Copenhagen Jazz Festival started in Copenhagen, Denmark (July 6 – 15).
- 7 – Ola Kvernberg was recipient of the Kongsberg Jazz Award (DNB.prisen) 2012 at the Kongsberg Jazzfestival.
- 8 – The 65th Nice Jazz Festival started in Nice, France (July 8 – 12).
- 14 – The 47th Pori Jazz Festival started in Pori, Finland (July 14 – 21).
- 16 – The 52nd Moldejazz started in Molde, Norway with Jon Balke as artist in residence (July 16–21).
- 17
  - Mopti was awarded the JazzIntro 2012 at Moldejazz.
  - Anja Eline Skybakmoen was awarded the Jazztalent 2012 at Moldejazz.
  - Albatrosh was awarded the JazZtipendiat 2012 at Moldejazz.
- 19 – The 47th San Sebastian Jazz Festival started in San Sebastian, Spain (July 19 – 23).

=== August ===
- 3 – The 56th Newport Jazz Festival started in Newport, Rhode Island (August 3 – 5).
- 8 – The 26th Sildajazz started in Haugesund, Norway (August 8–12).
- 10
  - Marte Eberson was awarded the Sildajazzprisen 2012.
  - The 28th Brecon Jazz Festival started in Brecon, Wales (August 10 – 12).
- 13
  - The 27th Oslo Jazzfestival started in Oslo, Norway (August 13–18).
  - Bugge Wesseltoft was recipient of the Ella-prisen 2012 at the Oslo Jazzfestival.

=== September ===
- 3 – The 8th Punktfestivalen started in Kristiansand, Norway (September 3 – 5).
- 16 – The 55th Monterey Jazz Festival started in Monterey, California (September 16 – 18).

=== October ===
- 1 – The 29th Stockholm Jazz Festival started in Sweden (October 1 – 7).

=== November ===
- 9 – 21st London Jazz Festival started in London, England (November 9 – 18).
- November 19 - New jazz band GoGo Penguin is formed and releases their debut album

== Album released ==
Month	Day	Album	Artist	Label	Notes	Ref.
January	27	The Well	Tord Gustavsen Quartet	ECM Records		
January	27	Klangkammer 1	Stian Omenås	NorCD		
February	28	Black Radio	Robert Glasper Experiment	Blue Note Records	Awarded Grammy Award for Best R&B Album at the 55th Annual Grammy Awards	
March	20	Radio Music Society	Esperanza Spalding	Heads Up International	Awarded Grammy Award for Best Jazz Vocal Album and Grammy Award for Best Arrangement Accompanying Vocalist(s) at the 55th Annual Grammy Awards	
April	10	Seeds from the Underground	Kenny Garrett	Mack Avenue Records	Nominated for Grammy Award for Best Jazz Instrumental Album and Grammy Award for Best Improvised Jazz Solo at the 55th Annual Grammy Awards	
May	8	Reminder	Pixel	Cuneiform Records		
May	15	Double Exposure	John Pizzarelli	Telarc		
May	22	Initial Here	Linda May Han Oh	Greenleaf Music		
June	12	Unity Band	Pat Metheny	Nonesuch Records		
September	1	Barxeta	Acuña • Hoff • Mathisen	Losen Records		
September	11	Alive at the Vangaurd	Fred Hersch Trio		Recorded at the Village Vanguard	
September	25	Made Possible	The Bad Plus	E1 music		
October	16	Siren Terpsichore	Ike Moriz	Mosquito Records London Pty Ltd.	produced by Ike Moriz	
October	16	Now Here This	John McLaughlin and the 4th Dimension	Abstract Logix		
November	12	Dream Logic	Eivind Aarset	ECM Records	Produced by Jan Bang	
November	13	Star of Jupiter	Kurt Rosenwinkel			
November	19	Fanfares	GoGo Penguin	Gondwana Records		

== Deaths ==
January

- 4 – Totti Bergh, Norwegian saxophonist (born 1935).
- 9 – Ernie Carson, American cornetist, pianist, and singer (born 1937).
- 18 – Keshav Sathe, Indian tabla player (born 1928).
- 20
  - Etta James, American singer (born 1938).
  - John Levy, American upright-bassist (born 1912).
- 21 – Herbie Harper, American trombonist (born 1920).
- 26 – Clare Fischer, American keyboardist, composer, arranger, and bandleader (born 1928).
- 27 – Kay Davis, American singer (born 1920).

February

- 6
  - Billy Bean, American guitarist (born 1933).
  - Noel Kelehan, Irish musician and conductor, RTÉ Concert Orchestra (died 2012).
- 22
  - Eivin One Pedersen, Norwegian accordionist and pianist (born 1956).
  - Mike Melvoin, American pianist, composer, and arranger (born 1937).
- 24 – Bob Badgley, American upright bassist (born 1928).
- 25 – Red Holloway, American tenor saxophonist (born 1927).

March

- 1 – Lucio Dalla, Italian singer, clarinetist and actor (born 1943).
- 3 – Frank Marocco, American piano-accordionist, arranger and composer (born 1916).
- 11 – Leon Spencer, American organist (born 1945).

April

- 11 – Hal McKusick, American alto saxophonist, clarinetist, and flutist (born 1924).
- 12 – Rodgers Grant, American jazz pianist, composer, and lyricist (born 1936).
- 16 – Teddy Charles, American vibraphonist, pianist, drummer, and composer (born 1928).
- 20
  - Ayten Alpman, Turkish singer (born 1929).
  - Joe Muranyi, Hungarian-American clarinetist, producer, and critic (born 1928).
  - Virgil Jones, American trumpeter (born 1939).
- 23 – Peter Boothman, Australian guitarist, composer and educator (born 1943).

May

- 8 – Frank Parr, English trombonist and cricketer (born 1928).
- 10 - Bernardo Sassetti, Portuguese pianist and composer (born 1970).
- 11 – Roland Shaw, English composer, musical arranger, and orchestra leader (born 1920).
- 30 – Pete Cosey, American guitarist (born 1943).

June

- 3 – Andy Hamilton, Jamaican-British saxophonist and composer (born 1918).
- 13 – Graeme Bell, Australian pianist, composer and band leader (born 1914).
- 14 – Margie Hyams, American jazz vibraphonist, pianist, and arranger (born 1920).
- 15 – Rune Gustafsson, Swedish guitarist and composer (born 1933).
- 19 – Tale Ognenovski, Macedonian clarinetist and multi-instrumentalist (born 1922).

July

- 1 – Fritz Pauer, Austrian pianist, composer, and bandleader (born 1943).
- 4 – Larance Marable, American drummer (born 1929).
- 8 – Lionel Batiste, American bass drummer and singer (born 1931).
- 10 - Lol Coxhill, English saxophonist and raconteur (born 1932).
- 13 – Harry Betts, American trombonist (born 1922).
- 14 – Victor Gaskin, American bassist (born 1932).
- 16 – Ed Lincoln, Brazilian pianist, upright bassist, Hammond organist, and composer (born 1932).
- 26 – Don Bagley, American bassist (born 1927).

August

- 2 – Tomasz Szukalski, Polish saxophonist, composer, and improviser (born 1947).
- 11 – Von Freeman, American saxophonist (born 1923).
- 21 – Flavio Ambrosetti, Swiss vibraphonist, saxophonist, and engineer (born 1919).
- 23 – Byard Lancaster, American saxophonist and flutist (born 1942).

September

- 2 – John C. Marshall, British guitarist, vocalist, and songwriter (born 1941).
- 10 – Steven Springer, American guitarist, Trinidad Tripoli Steel Band (born 1951).
- 27 – Eddie Bert, American trombonist (born 1922).
- 28 – Jacky June, Belgian saxophonist, clarinetist, and bandleader (born 1924).

October

- 8 – John Tchicai, Danish saxophonist and composer (born 1936).
- 9 – Eddie Harvey, British pianist, trombonist, arranger, and educator (born 1925).
- 12 – Erik Moseholm, Danish bassist, composer, and bandleader (born 1930).
- 18
  - Borah Bergman, American pianist (born 1926).
  - David S. Ware, American saxophonist, composer, and bandleader (born 1949).
- 20 – Candy Johnson, American singer and dancer (born 1944).
- 26 – Carlos Azevedo, Portuguese composer and pianist (born 1949).

November

- 4 – Ted Curson, American trumpeter (born 1935).
- 15 – Frode Thingnæs, Norwegian jazz trombonist and bandleader (complications from a heart attack) (born 1940).
- 18 – Stan Greig, Scottish pianist, drummer, and bandleader (born 1930).
- 20 – Pete La Roca, American drummer (born 1938).
- 21 – Austin Peralta, American pianist and composer (born 1990).
- 27 – Mickey Baker, American guitarist (born 1925).

December

- 5 – Dave Brubeck, American jazz pianist and composer (born 1920).
- 6 – Ed Cassidy, American drummer (born 1923).
- 22 – Frances Klein, American trumpeter (born 1915).

== See also ==
- List of 2012 albums
- List of years in jazz
- 2010s in jazz
- 2012 in music
