= 1927 in jazz =

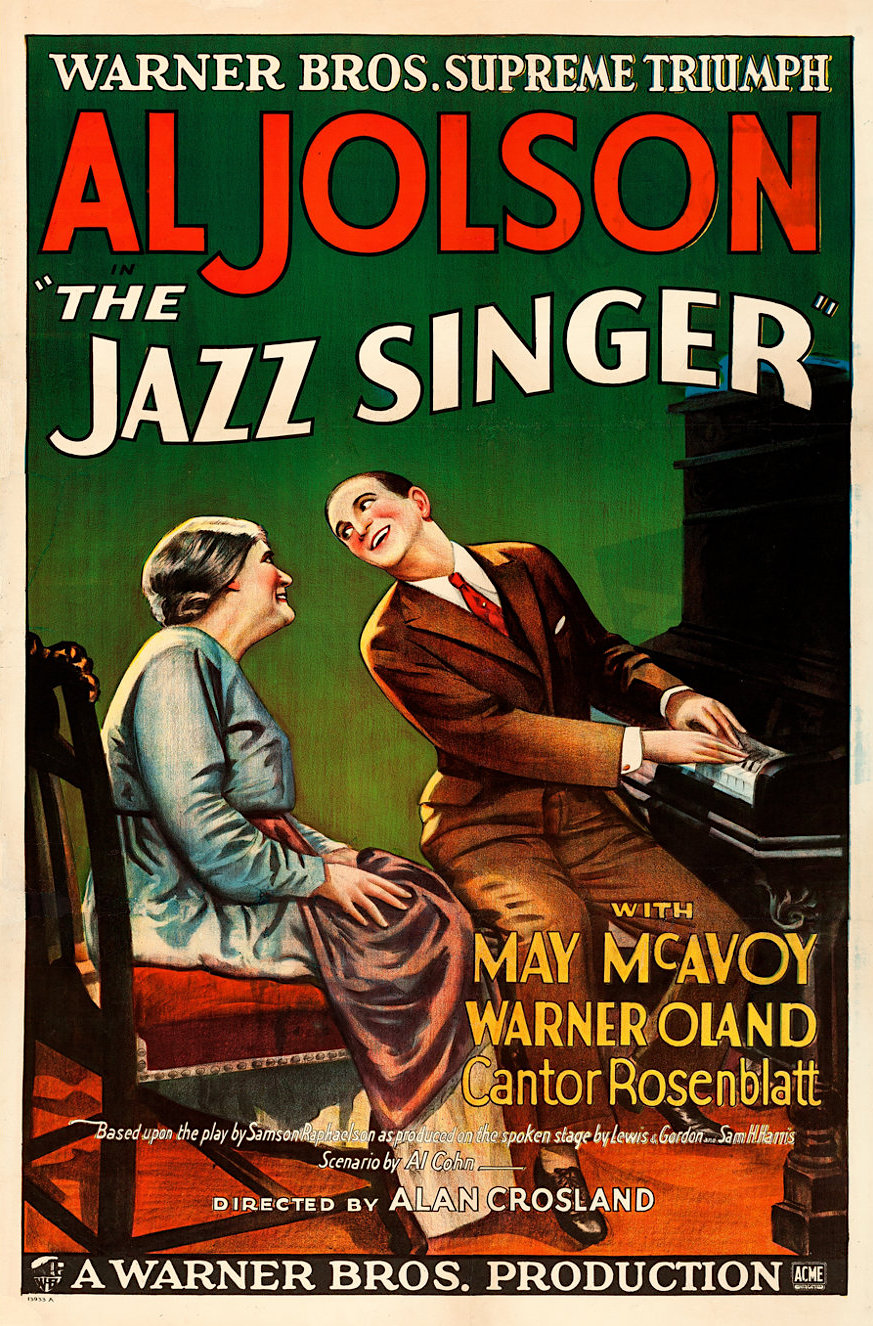
- Poster for the film The Jazz Singer (1927), featuring stars Eugenie Besserer and Al Jolson
- Decade: 1920s in jazz
- Music: 1927 in music
- Standards: List of 1920s jazz standards
- See also: 1926 in jazz – 1928 in jazz

This is a timeline documenting events of Jazz in the year 1927.

Musicians born that year included John Dankworth, Cleo Laine and Stan Getz.

== Events ==
- April 21 – Electric re-recording of George Gershwin's "Rhapsody in Blue" by Paul Whiteman's Orchestra directed by Nathaniel Shilkret, with Gershwin at the piano. In 1925, electrical recording vastly improved the quality of recordings, and many important recordings, including Whiteman's 1924 recording of the Rhapsody, were re-recorded electrically. Whiteman was at the podium, but left the studio because of a disagreement with Gershwin over the tempo. Shilkret, Victor's Director of Light Music at the time, took the baton, and the recording was completed as scheduled. The recording was inducted into the Grammy Hall of Fame in 1974.

== Standards ==
- In 1927 standards published included "Blue Skies" and "'S Wonderful".

== Deaths ==
October

- 17 – Louis Cottrell, Sr., American drummer and father of Louis Cottrell, Jr. (born 1878).

November

- 1 – Florence Mills, American cabaret singer, dancer, and comedian (born 1896).

Unknown date

== Births ==
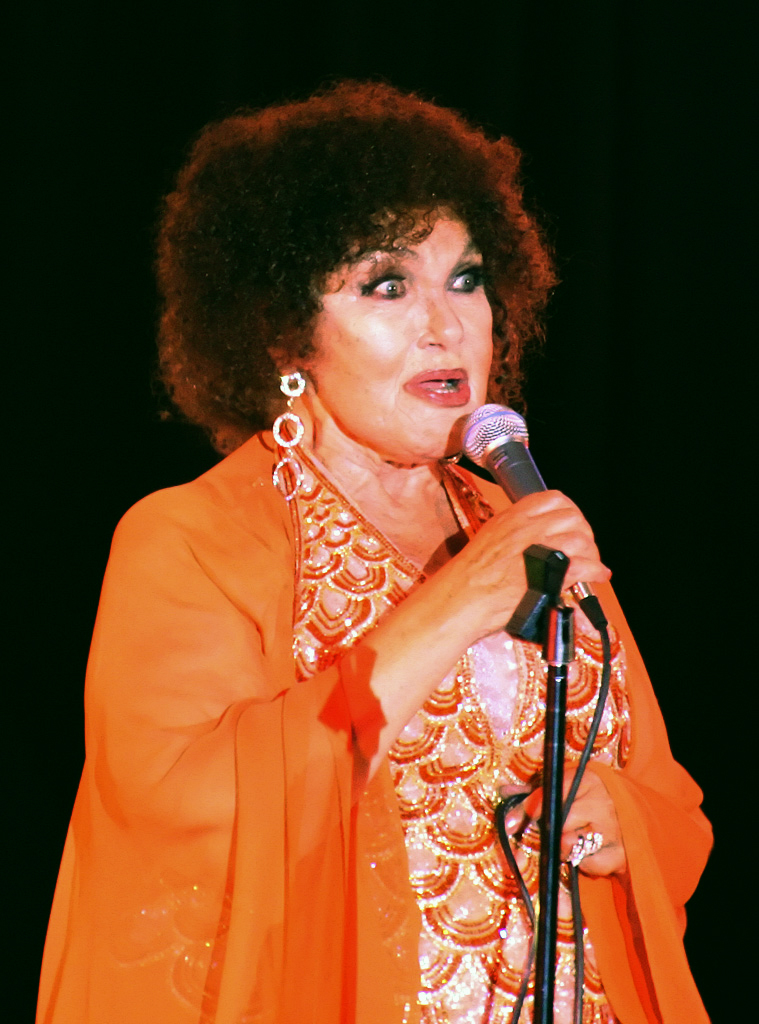
Cleo Laine

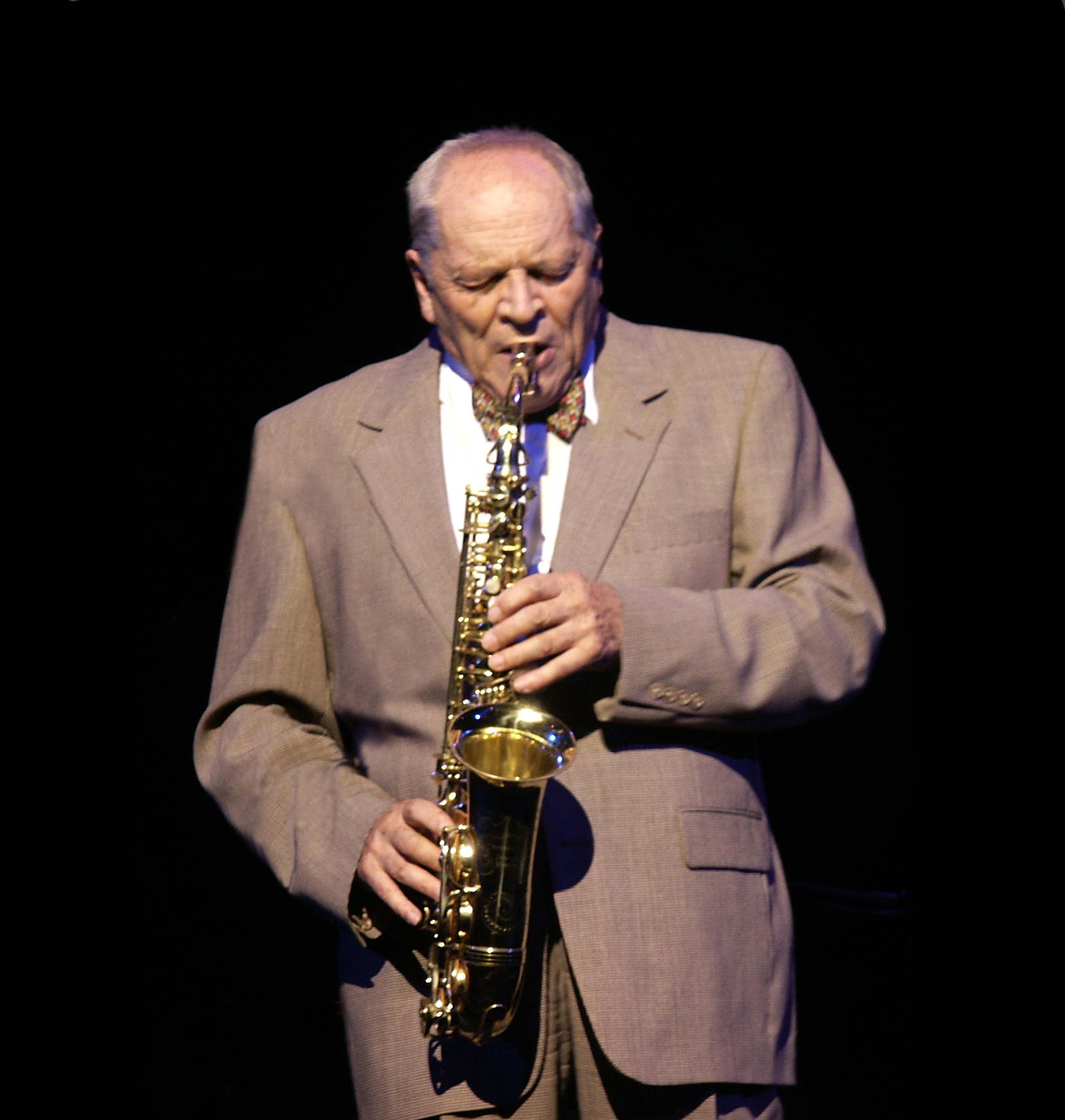
John Dankworth at Buxton Opera House on 4 November 2002, while in concert with Cleo Laine.

=== January ===
- 2 – John McLevy, Scottish trumpeter (died 2002).
- 5 – Lennie Hastings, English drummer (died 1978).
- 10 – Allen Eager, American saxophonist (died 2003).
- 11 – Wilton Gaynair, Jamaican saxophonist (died 1995).
- 12 – Guy Lafitte, French tenor saxophonist (died 1998).
- 13 – Dick Wetmore, American violinist (died 2007).
- 15 – Buddy Banks, Canadian upright bassist (died 2005).
- 17 – Eartha Kitt, American singer and actress (died 2008).
- 19 – J. R. Monterose, American saxophonist (died 1993).
- 20 – Bill Le Sage, British pianist, and vibraphonist (died 2001).
- 25 – Antônio Carlos Jobim, Brazilian composer (died 1994).
- 28 – Ronnie Scott, English saxophonist (died 1996).
- 29 – Don Shirley, American-Jamaican pianist (died 2013).
- 30
  - Ahmed Abdul-Malik, American upright bassist (died 1993).
  - Hank Marr, American organist (died 2004).

=== February ===
- 2 – Stan Getz, American saxophonist (died 1991).
- 4 – Tony Fruscella, American trumpeter (died 1969).
- 6 – Don Fagerquist, American trumpeter (died 1974).
- 8 – John Hubbard Beecher, American trumpeter (died 1987).
- 9 – Joe Maneri, American saxophonist (died 2009).
- 13 – Buck Hill, American saxophonist (died 2017).
- 25 – René Thomas, Belgian guitarist (died 1975).

=== March ===
- 4 – Cy Touff, American bass trumpeter (died 2003).
- 8 – Dick Hyman, American pianist and composer.
- 10 – Donn Trenner, American pianist and arranger (died 2020).
- 16 – Ruby Braff, American trumpeter (died 2003).
- 17 – Horst Lippmann, German drummer (died 1997).
- 20 – John R. T. Davies, English trombonist, trumpeter, alto saxophonistaudio, and sound engineer (died 2004).

=== April ===
- 6 – Gerry Mulligan, American saxophonist (died 1996).
- 10 – George Freeman, American guitarist.
- 17 – Junior Collins, American French horn player (died 1976).
- 27
  - Connie Kay, American drummer (died 1994).
  - Sal Mosca, American jazz pianist (died 2007).
- 29 – Big Jay McNeely, American saxophonist (died 2018).

=== May ===
- 1 – Billy Byers, American trombonist (died 1996).
- 8 – Phil Cohran, American trumpeter (died 2017).
- 12 – Barbara Dane, American singer.(died 2024).
- 16 – Lucy Ann Polk, American jazz singer (died 2011).
- 21
  - Bill Holman, American composer, conductor, and saxophonist.
  - Chuck Stewart, American photographer (died 2017).
- 24 – Charles Greenlww, American trombonist (died 1993).
- 30
  - Clora Bryant, American trumpeter (died 2019).
  - Dick Noel, American singer (died 2017).
  - Shake Keane, Jamaican trumpeter (died 1997).
- 31 – Red Holloway, American tenor saxophonist (died 2012).

=== June ===
- 6 – Eddie Cano, Afro-Cuban pianist (died 1988).
- 12 – Al Fairweather, British trumpeter (died 1993).
- 13 – Attila Zoller, Hungarian-born American guitarist (died 1998).
- 24 – Ian Christie, English clarinettist (died 2010).

=== July ===
- 2
  - Charlie Kennedy, American saxophonist (died 2009).
  - Tommy Turk, American trombonist (died 1981).
- 7 – Doc Severinsen, American trumpeter.
- 10
  - Luigi Waites, American drummer and vibraphonist (died 2010).
  - Marcel Azzola, French accordionist (died 2019).
- 12 – Conte Candoli, American trumpeter (died 2001).
- 13 – Ike Cole, American pianist and composer (died 2001).
- 14 – Max Brüel, Danish pianist and saxophonist (died 1995).
- 18 – Don Bagley, American bassist (died 2012).

=== August ===
- 4 – Johnny Maddox, American pianist (died 2018).
- 6 – Bucky Calabrese, American upright bassist (died 1995).
- 8 – Frank Traynor, Australian trombonist (died 1985).
- 13 – Joe Puma, American guitarist (died 2000).
- 15 – Joe Castro, American pianist (died 2009).
- 16 – Danny Moss, British jazz saxophonist (died 2008).
- 17 – Sam Butera, American saxophonist (died 2009).
- 20
  - Basil Kirchin, English drummer and composer (died 2005).
  - Jimmy Raney, American guitarist (died 1995).
- 22 – Malachi Favors, American bassist (died 2004).
- 23 – Martial Solal, French pianist.(died 2024).

=== September ===
- 8 – Specs Wright, American drummer (died 1963).
- 9
  - Benny Green, British saxophonist (died 1998).
  - Elvin Jones, American drummer (died 2004).
- 20
  - Colette Bonheur, Canadian singer (died 1966).
  - John Dankworth, English saxophonist (died 2010).
  - Red Mitchell, American upright bassist (died 1992).
- 21 – Ward Swingle, American singer and pianist (died 2015).
- 25 – Earl Zindars, American composer (died 2005).
- 26 – Romano Mussolini, Italian pianist (died 2006).
- 27 – Red Rodney, American trumpeter (died 1994).

=== October ===
- 4 – Walter Bishop Jr., American pianist (died 1998).
- 7 – Al Martino, American singer and actor (died 2009).
- 11
  - Curtis Amy, American tenor saxophonist (died 2002).
  - Tony Kinsey, English drummer and composer.
- 13
  - Anita Kerr, American singer, pianist, and composer (died 2022).
  - Lee Konitz, American composer and alto saxophonist (died 2020).
- 20 – Ross McManus, English trumpeter (died 2011).
- 23
  - Fats Sadi, Belgian vibraphonist and percussionist (died 2009).
  - Sonny Criss, American saxophonist (died 1977).
- 26 – Warne Marsh, American tenor saxophonist (died 1987).
- 28 – Cleo Laine, British scat singer and actress.(died 2025).

=== November ===
- 3 – Andy McGhee, American tenor saxophonist and educator (died 2017).
- 6 – Don Lusher, English trombonist (died 2006).
- 8 – Chris Connor, American singer (died 2009).
- 11 – Mose Allison, American pianist and singer (died 2016).
- 16 – Dolo Coker, American pianist (died 1983).
- 18 – Victor Sproles, American bassist (died 2005).
- 22 – Jimmy Knepper, American trombonist (died 2003).
- 25 – Dick Wellstood, American pianist (died 1987).

=== December ===
- 5 – Bhumibol Adulyadej, Taj saxophonist (died 2016).
- 6
  - Akira Miyazawa, Japanese saxophonist, clarinetist, and flautist (died 2000).
  - Tom McIntosh, American trombonist and composer (died 2017).
- 10 – Gerorge Tucker, American upright bassist (died 1965).
- 15 – Gene Quill, American alto saxophonist (died 1988).
- 20 – Charlie Callas, American comedian and actor (died 2011).
- 22 – Ronnie Ball, English pianist (died 1984).
- 25 – Ernie Andrews, American singer (died 2022).
- 27 – Bill Crow, American bassist and author.

== Bibliography ==
- The New Real Book, Volume I. Sher Music. 1988. ISBN 0-9614701-4-3.
- The New Real Book, Volume II. Sher Music. 1991. ISBN 0-9614701-7-8.
- The New Real Book, Volume III. Sher Music. 1995. ISBN 1-883217-30-X.
- The Real Book, Volume I (6th ed.). Hal Leonard. 2004. ISBN 0-634-06038-4.
- The Real Book, Volume II (2nd ed.). Hal Leonard. 2007. ISBN 978-1-4234-2452-9.
- The Real Book, Volume III (2nd ed.). Hal Leonard. 2006. ISBN 0-634-06136-4.
- The Real Jazz Book. Warner Bros. ISBN 978-91-85041-36-7.
- The Real Vocal Book, Volume I. Hal Leonard. 2006. ISBN 0-634-06080-5.
