= 2003 in jazz =

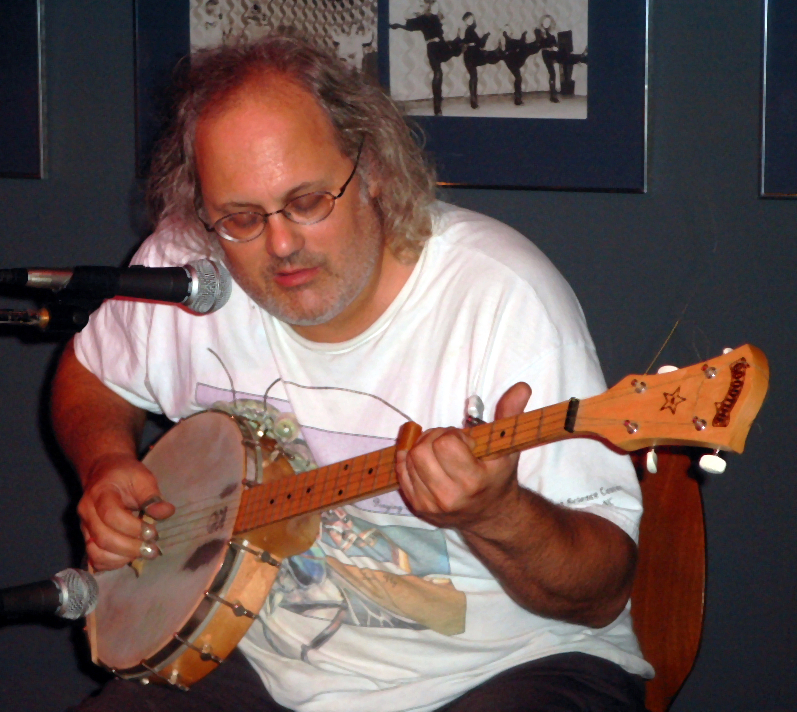
- Eugene Chadbourne in 2003.
- Decade: 2000s in jazz
- Music: 2003 in music
- Standards: List of jazz standards
- See also: 2002 in jazz – 2004 in jazz

This is a timeline documenting events of jazz in the year 2003.

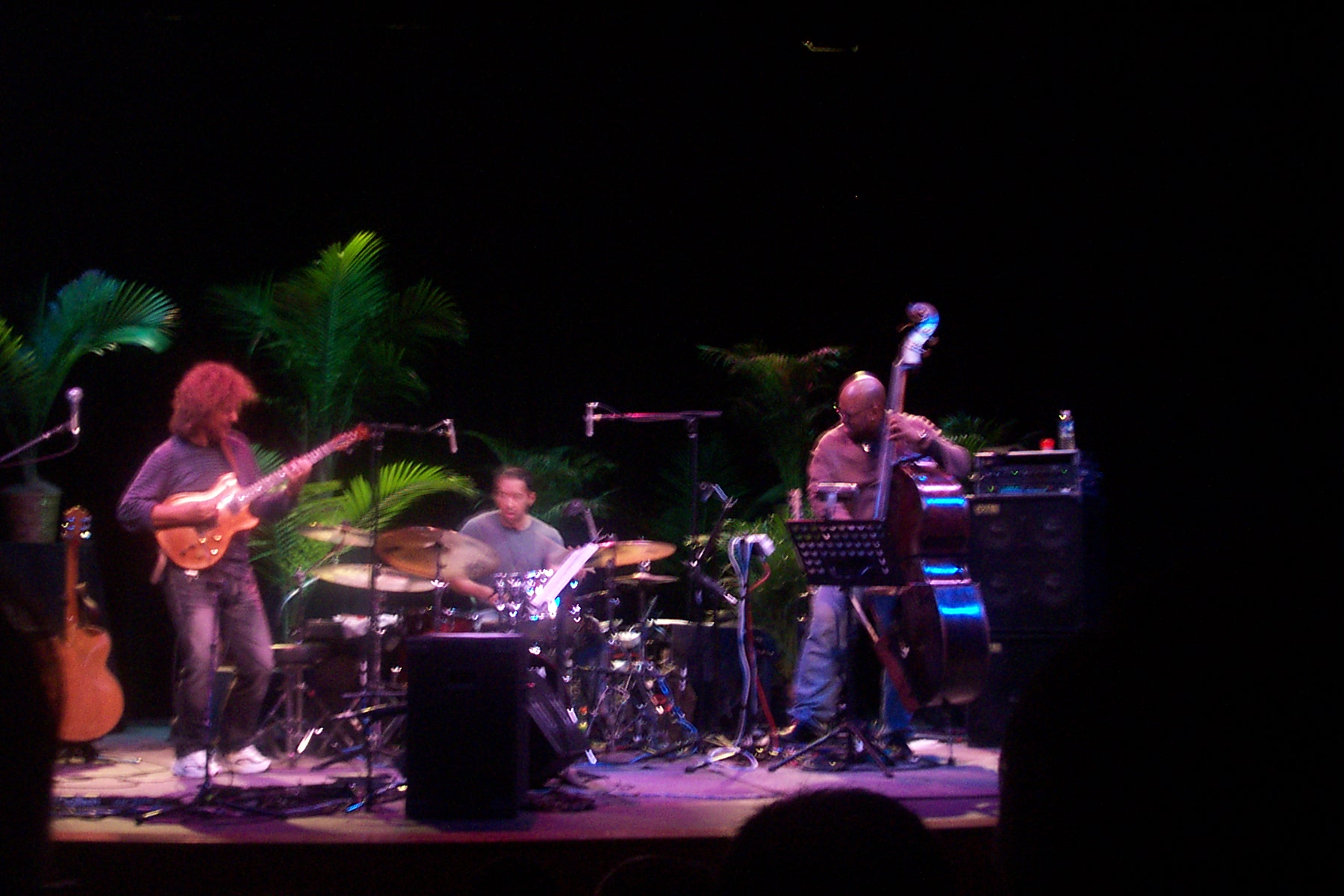
Pat Metheny Trio 2003 in Pitsburg.

== Events ==
=== January ===
- 30 – The 6th Polarjazz started in Longyearbyen, Svalbard (January 30 – February 2).

=== April ===
- 11
  - The 30th Vossajazz started at Vossavangen, Norway (April 11 – 13).
  - Kåre Opheim was awarded Vossajazzprisen 2003.
- 3 – Terje Rypdal performs the commissioned work Vossabrygg for Vossajazz 2003.

=== May ===
- 21 – The 31st Nattjazz 2004 started in Bergen, Norway (May 21 – 31).

=== June ===
- 6 – The 32nd Moers Festival started in Moers, Germany (June 6 – 9).
- 23 – The 15th Jazz Fest Wien started in Vienna, Austria (June 23 – July 13).
- 26 – The 24th Montreal International Jazz Festival started in Montreal, Canada (June 26 - July 6).

=== July ===
- 4 – The 37th Montreux Jazz Festival started in Montreux, Switzerland (July 4 – 20).
  - The 25th Copenhagen Jazz Festival started in Copenhagen, Denmark (July 2 – 11).
- 11 – The 28th North Sea Jazz Festival started in The Hague, Netherlands (July 11 – 13).
- 12 – The 38th Pori Jazz Festival started in Pori, Finland (July 12 – 20).
- 14 – The 43rd Moldejazz started in Molde, Norway (July 14 – 19).
- 22 – The 56th Nice Jazz Festival started in Nice, France (July 22 – 29).
- 24 – The 38th San Sebastian Jazz Festival started in San Sebastian, Spain (July 24 – 29).
- 25 – The 20th Stockholm Jazz Festival started in Stockholm, Sweden (July 25 – August 2).

=== August ===
- 6 – The 17th Sildajazz started in Haugesund, Norway (August 6 – 10).
- 8 – The 20th Brecon Jazz Festival started in Brecon, Wales (August 8 – 10).
- 11
  - The 49th Newport Jazz Festival started in Newport, Rhode Island (April 11 – 15).
  - The 18th Oslo Jazzfestival started in Oslo, Norway (August 11–17).
- 18
  - The Public Law 108 - 72 - Smithsonian Facilities Authorization Act, which includes language strongly endorsing Jazz and urging that "musicians, schools, colleges, libraries, concert halls, museums, radio and television stations, and other organizations should develop programs to explore, perpetuate, and honor Jazz as a national and world treasure", was signed by President George W. Bush.

=== September ===
- 19 – The 46th Monterey Jazz Festival started in Monterey, California (September 19 – 21).

=== November ===
- 14 – The 12th London Jazz Festival started in London, England (November 14 – 23).

== Album released ==
=== May ===
| Day | Album | Artist | Label | Notes | Ref. |
|---|---|---|---|---|---|
| 13 | One Quiet Night | Pat Metheny | Warner Bros. | Produced by Pat Metheny, Steve Rodby | |

=== June ===
| Day | Album | Artist | Label | Notes | Ref. |
|---|---|---|---|---|---|
| 3 | Big Band Reflections of Cole Porter | Jazz Orchestra of the Delta, Jack Cooper | Summit Records | Produced by Jack Cooper | |

=== August ===
| Day | Album | Artist | Label | Notes | Ref. |
|---|---|---|---|---|---|
| 1 | Eclectikos | Dekajaz | DJR | Produced by Megan foley | |

=== Unknown date ===
#

B

- Michael Brecker: Wide Angles

F

- Michael Franks: Watching the Snow

G

- Kenny Garrett: Standard of Language
- Gordon Goodwin's Big Phat Band: XXL

i

- The Idea of North: Here & Now

M

- James Morrison: On The Edge (with Simon Stockhausen)

N

- Mike Nock: Changing Seasons with Brett Hirst and Toby Hall

R

- The Rippingtons: Let It Ripp

S

- Wayne Shorter: Alegria

W

- Amy Winehouse: Frank

== Deaths ==
January

- 5 – Ramon Carranza, Venezuelan saxophonist and composer (born 1940).
- 11 – William Russo, American composer, conductor, and trombonist (born 1928).
- 24 – Cy Touff, American bass trumpeter (born 1927).

February

- 1 – Mongo Santamaría, Afro-Cuban Latin jazz percussionist (born 1917).
- 4 – Charlie Biddle, Canadian upright bassist (born 1926).
- 5 – Werner Dies, German tenor saxophonist, clarinetist, guitarist, composer, and arranger (born 1928).
- 9 – Ruby Braff, American trumpeter and cornetist (born 1927).

March

- 6 – Linton Garner, American pianist (born 1915).
- 24 – Artie Shapiro, American upright bassist (born 1916).

April

- 7 – Jutta Hipp, German pianist and composer (born 1925).
- 13 – Allen Eager, American tenor and alto saxophonist (born 1927).
- 20 – Teddy Edwards, American saxophonist (born 1924).
- 21 – Nina Simone, American singer, songwriter, pianist, arranger, and civil rights activist (born 1933).
- 25 – Ted Joans, American poet, surrealist, trumpeter, and painter (born 1928).

May

- 5 – Jerry Rusch, American trumpeter (born 1943).
- 12 – Bross Townsend, American pianist (born 1933).

June

- 11 – Rudolf Tomsits, Hungarian trumpeter, flugelhornist, and composer (born 1946).
- 13 – Harold Ashby, American tenor saxophonist, Duke Ellington Orchestra (born 1925).
- 14 – Jimmy Knepper, American trombonist (born 1927).
- 15 – Volker Kriegel, German guitarist, United Jazz + Rock Ensemble
- 19 – Peanuts Hucko, American clarinetist and saxophonist (born 1918).
- 29 – Norman O'Connor, American pianist (born 1921).

July

- 1 – Herbie Mann, American flautist (prostate cancer) (born 1930).
- 10 – Alvin Alcorn, American trumpeter (born 1912).
- 12 – Benny Carter, American jazz saxophonist, composer, arranger and bandleader (bronchitis) (born 1907).
- 23 – Gary King, American bassist (born 1947).
- 28 – Aaron Bell, American upright bassist (born 1921).
- 29 – Luther Henderson, American arranger, composer, orchestrator, and pianist (born 1919).

August

- 6 – Grover Mitchell, American trombonist, Count Basie Orchestra (born 1930).
- 9 – Herbie Steward, American saxophonist, Four Brothers (born 1926).
- 10 – Bill Perkins, American saxophonist and flutist (born 1924).
- 26 – Wayne Andre, American trombonist (born 1931).

September

- 14 – John Serry Sr., American accordion virtuoso, composer, and arranger (born 1915).
- 19 – Frank Lowe, American saxophonist and composer (born 1943).
- 21 – Chris McGale, Canadian violinist (born 1923).
- 30 – Eddie Gladden, American jazz drummer (born 1937).

October

- 1 – Chubby Jackson, American upright bassist and band leader (born 1918).
- 9
  - Carl Fontana, American trombonist (born 1928).
  - Don Lanphere, American tenor and soprano saxophonist (born 1928).
- 20 – Maxine Daniels, English singer (born 1930).
- 22 – Ron Collier, Canadian trombonist, composer, and arranger (born 1930).
- 23 – Eraldo Volonté, Italian saxophonist and bandleader (born 1918).

November

- 3 – Aaron Bridgers, African-American pianist (born 1918).
- 9 – Buddy Arnold, American saxophonist (born 1926).
- 10 – Jed Williams, Welsh jazz journalist and the founder of the Brecon Jazz Festival (born 1952).

December

- 2 – John Brimhall, American musical arranger and author (born 1928).
- 13 – Webster Young, American trumpeter and cornetist (born 1932).
- 21 – Hans Koller, Austrian tenor saxophonist and bandleader (born 1921).
- 23 – Don Lamond, American drummer (born 1920).

Unknown date

- Jacques Butler, American trumpeter and vocalist (born 1909).

== Births ==
June

- 25 – Joey Alexander, Indonesian pianist.

== See also ==
- List of years in jazz
- 2000s in jazz
- 2003 in music
