= 2009 in jazz =

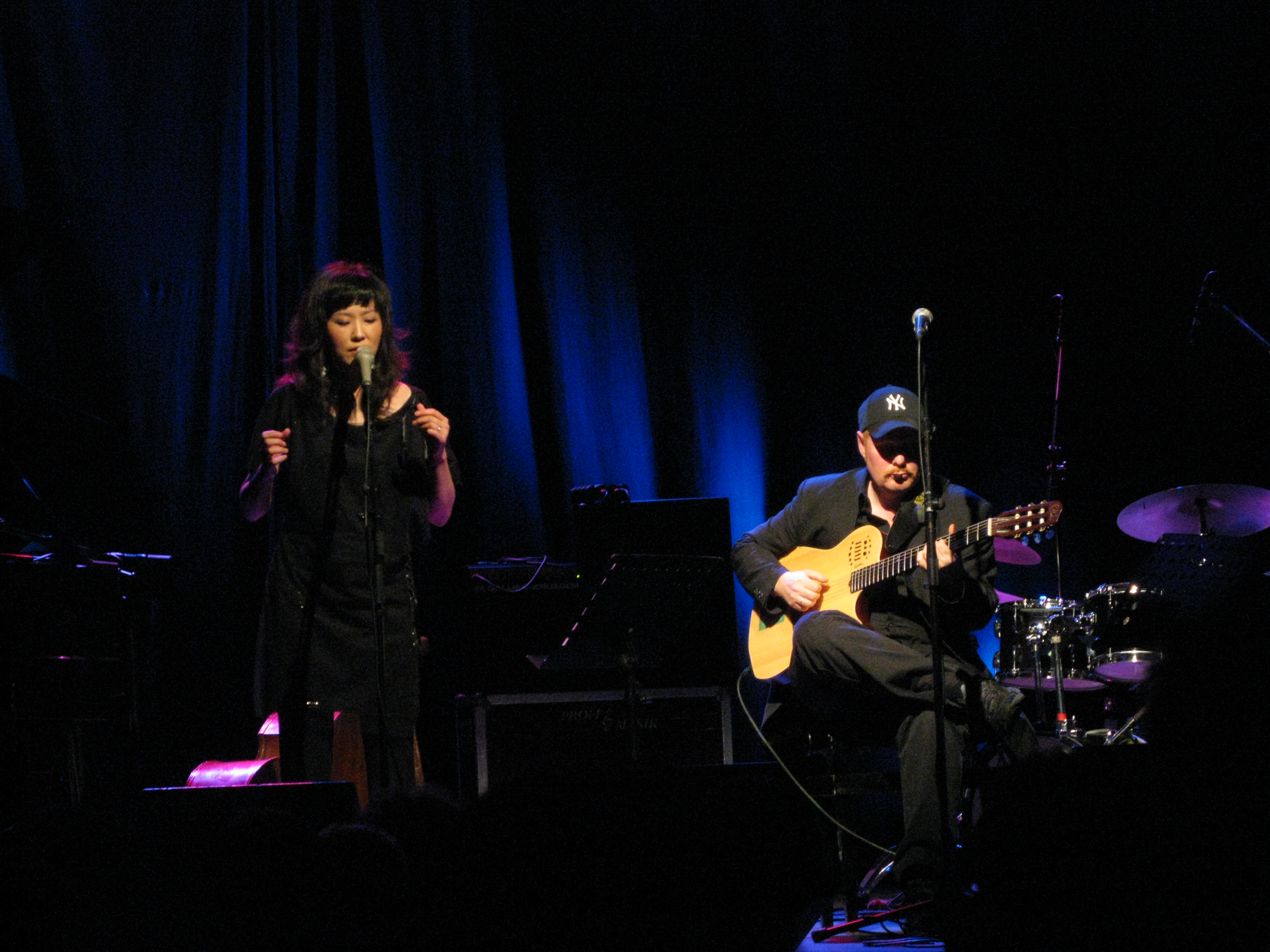
- Ulf Wakenius with Youn Sun Nah, 2009.
- Decade: 2000s in jazz
- Music: 2009 in music
- Standards: List of jazz standards
- See also: 2008 in jazz – 2010 in jazz

This is a timeline documenting events of Jazz in the year 2009.

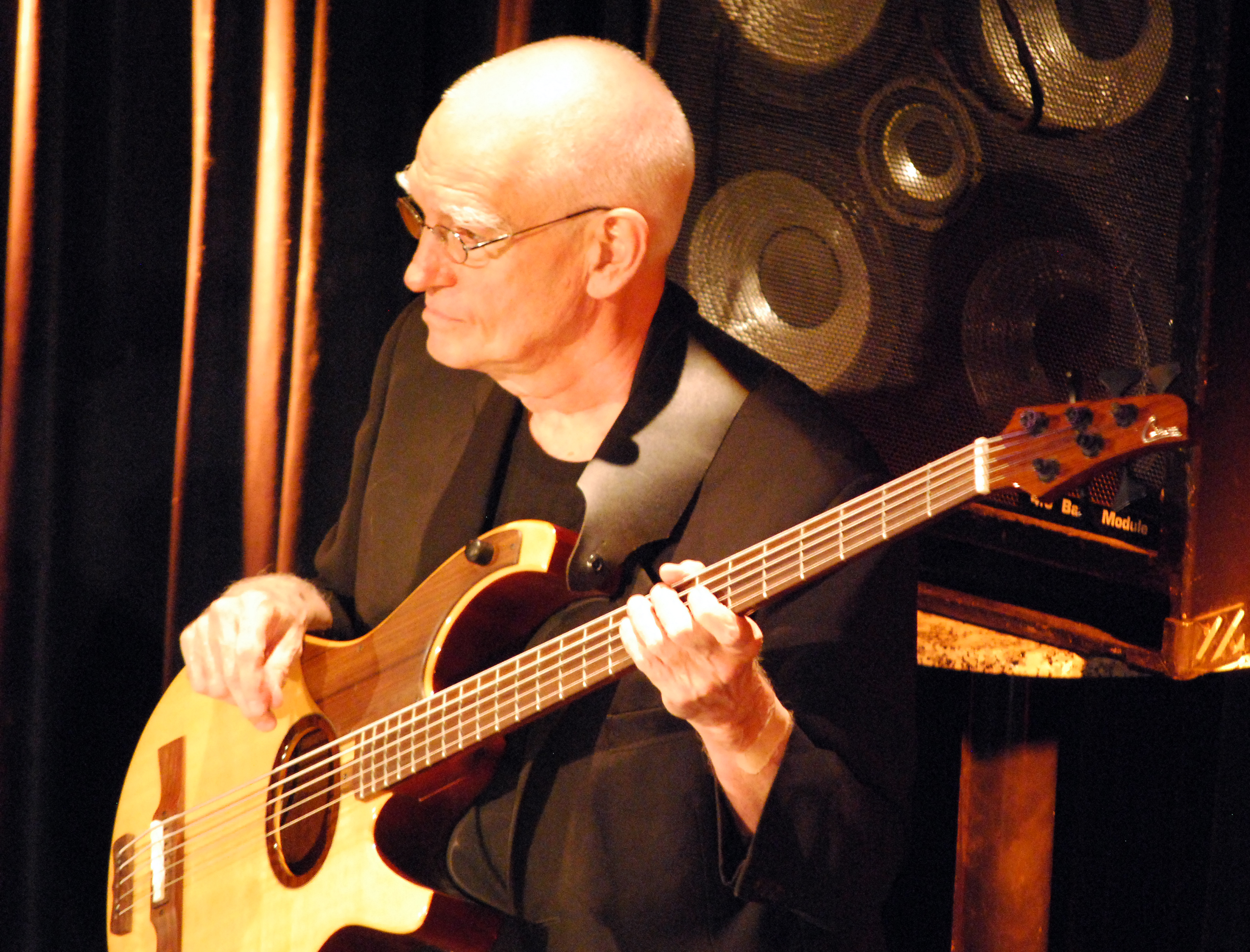
Steve Swallow at Treibhaus, Innsbruck 2009.

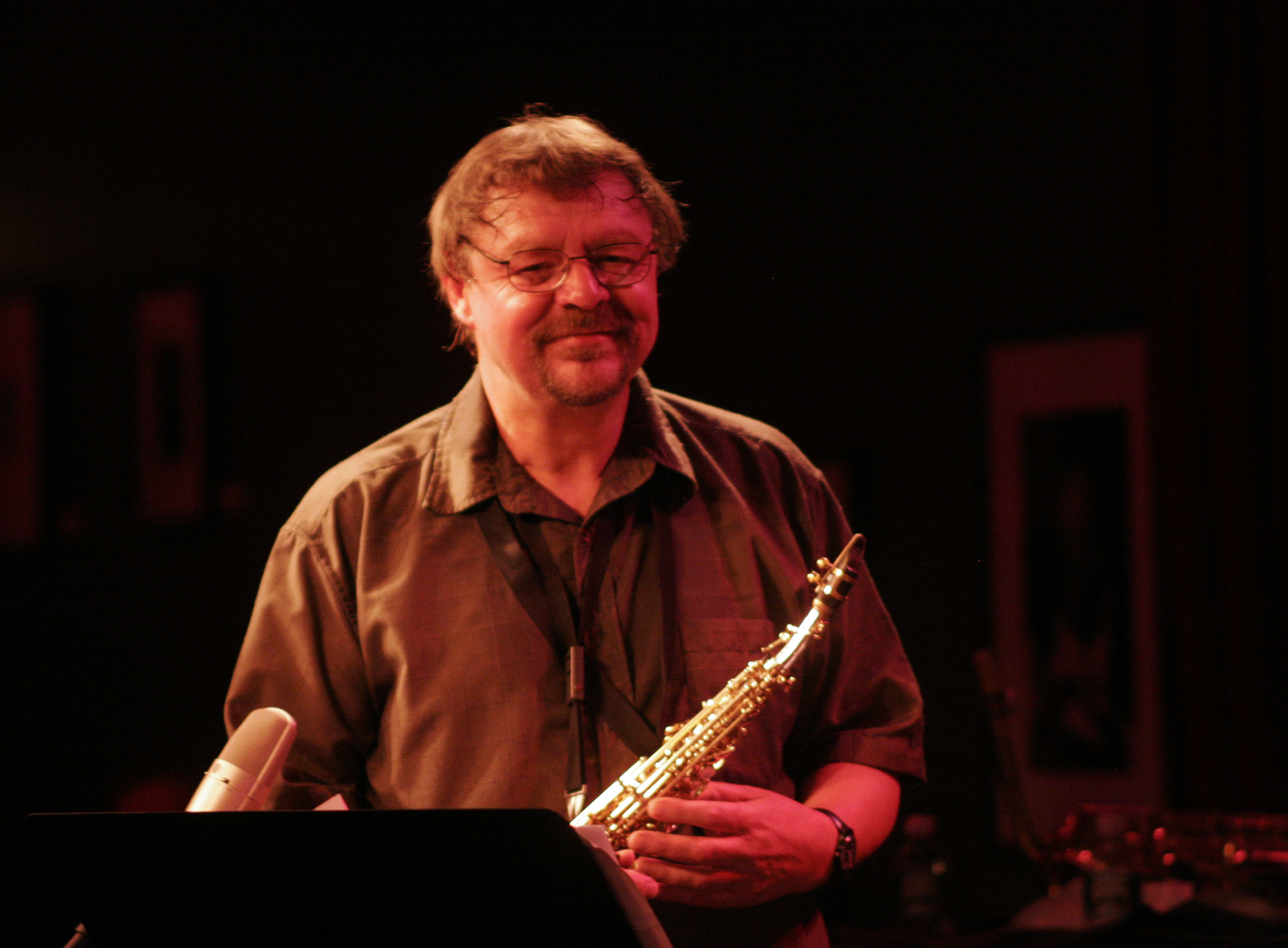
John Surman at Birdland 2009.

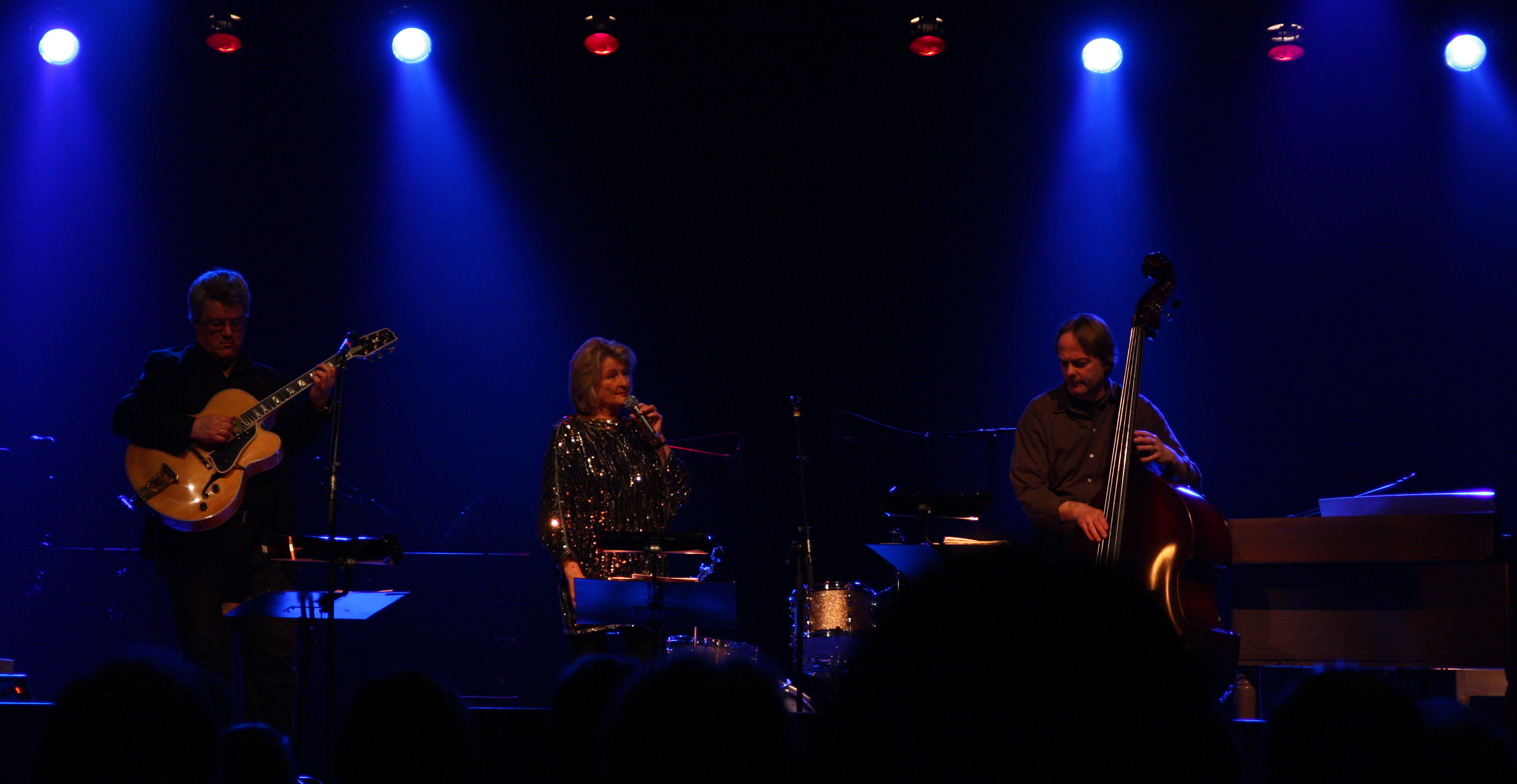
Karin Krog with Staffan William-Olsson and Terje Gewelt 2009.

== Events ==
=== January ===
- 9 – The 5th Ice Music Festival started in Geilo, Norway (January 9 – 11).

=== February ===
- 4 – The 12th Polarjazz Festival started in Longyearbyen, Svalbard (February 4–8).

=== March ===
- 6 – The 5th Jakarta International Java Jazz Festival started in Jakarta, Indonesia (March 6–8).
- 18
  - The 36th Vossajazz started at Voss, Norway (March 18–20).
  - Kjetil Møster was awarded Vossajazzprisen 2009.
- 19 – Solveig Slettahjell performs the commissioned work Tarpan Seasons for Vossajazz 2009.

=== April ===
- 22 – The 15th SoddJazz started in Inderøy, Norway (April 22–26).

=== May ===
- 20 – The 37th Nattjazz started in Bergen, Norway (May 26–30).
- 29 – The 38th Moers Festival started in Moers, Germany (May 29 – June 1).

=== June ===
- 29 – The 21st Jazz Fest Wien started in Vienna, Austria (June 29 – July 9).
- 30 – The 29th Montreal International Jazz Festival started in Montreal, Quebec, Canada (June 30 - July 12).

=== July ===
- 1 – The 45th Kongsberg Jazzfestival started in Kongsberg, Norway (July 1 – 4).
- 3
  - The 31st Copenhagen Jazz Festival started in Copenhagen, Denmark (July 3 – 12).
  - The 43rd Montreux Jazz Festival started in Montreux, Switzerland (July 3 – 18).
- 10
  - The 34th North Sea Jazz Festival started in The Hague, Netherlands (July 10 – 12).
  - The 44th Pori Jazz Festival started in Pori, Finland (July 10 – 19).
- 13 – The 49th Moldejazz started in Molde, Norway (July 13 – 18).
- 15 – The 26th Stockholm Jazz Festival started in Stockholm, Sweden (July 15 – 18).
- 18
  - The 44th San Sebastian Jazz Festival started in San Sebastian, Spain (July 18 – 20).
  - The 62nd Nice Jazz Festival started in Nice, France (July 18 – 25).

=== August ===
- 7 – The 25th Brecon Jazz Festival started in Brecon, Wales (August 7 – 9).
- 8 – The 53rd Newport Jazz Festival started in Newport, Rhode Island (August 8 – 10).
- 9 – The 24th Oslo Jazzfestival started in Oslo, Norway (August 9 – 15).
- 12 – The 23rd Sildajazz starts in Haugesund, Norway (August 12 – 16).

=== September ===
- 2 – The 5th Punktfestivalen started in Kristiansand, Norway (September 2 – 5).
- 19 – The 52nd Monterey Jazz Festival started in Monterey, California (September 19 – 21).

=== November ===
- 13 – The 18th London Jazz Festival started in England (November 13 – 22).

== Album released ==
=== March ===
Day	Album	Artist	Label	Notes	Ref.
2	Piety Street	John Scofield	Universal Classics		
24	Sounding Point	Julian Lage	EmArcy Records		

=== April ===
Day	Album	Artist	Label	Notes	Ref.
14	La Línea del Sur	Renaud Garcia-Fons	Enja Records		
16	Remembrance	Ketil Bjørnstad	ECM Records	Produced by Manfred Eicher	

=== May ===
Day	Album	Artist	Label	Notes	Ref.
26	Quartet Live	Gary Burton, Pat Metheny, Steve Swallow, Antonio Sanchez	Concord Music Group	Produced by Gary Burton, Pat Metheny	

=== September ===
Day	Album	Artist	Label	Notes	Ref.
4	Jungle City	Acuña • Hoff • Mathisen	Alessa Records		

=== October ===
Day	Album	Artist	Label	Notes	Ref.
12	Restored, Returned	Tord Gustavsen Ensemble	ECM Records	Produced by Manfred Eicher	

=== December ===
Day	Album	Artist	Label	Notes	Ref.
28	Coming Through Slaughter: The Bolden Legend	Dave Lisik	SkyDeck Music	Produced by Dave Lisik	

== Deaths ==
January

- 17 – Whitey Mitchell, American jazz bassist and television writer/producer (born 1932).
- 20 – David "Fathead" Newman, American saxophonist (born 1933).
- 24 – Leonard Gaskin, American bassist (born 1920).
- 29 – Hank Crawford, American alto saxophonist, arranger, and songwriter (born 1934).

February

- 7 – Blossom Dearie, American jazz singer and pianist (born 1924).
- 9
  - Vic Lewis, British guitarist (born 1919).
  - Orlando "Cachaito" López, Cuban bassist and composer (born 1933).
- 12
  - Coleman Mellett, American jazz guitarist (plane crash) (born 1974).
  - Gerry Niewood, American jazz saxophonist (plane crash) (born 1943).
  - Mat Mathews, Dutch jazz accordionist (born 1924).
- 14 – Louie Bellson, American jazz drummer (born 1924).
- 15 – Joe Cuba, Puerto Rican jazz percussionist (born 1931).
- 18 – Snooks Eaglin, American guitarist and singer (born 1936).
- 19 – Harrison Ridley Jr., American jazz presenter (born 1938).
- 20 – Fats Sadi, Belgian jazz musician, vocalist and composer (born 1927).
- 25
  - Ian Carr, Scottish trumpeter, composer, writer, and educator (born 1933).
  - Lyman Woodard, American organist (born 1942).
- 27 – William L. Fowler, American jazz guitarist and educator (born 1917).
- 28 – Arthur Jenkins, American keyboardist, composer, arranger, and percussionist (born 1936).

March

- 11 – Lars Erstrand, Swedish vibraphonist (born 1936).
- 18
  - Eddie Bo, American singer and pianist (born 1930).
  - Moultrie Patten, American pianist and actor (born 1919).
- 25 – Tito Alberti, Argentine drummer (born 1923).

April

- 2 – Bud Shank, American alto saxophonist and flautist (born 1926).
- 3 – Charlie Kennedy, American alto saxophonist (born 1927).
- 7 – Gugge Hedrenius, Swedish pianist and bandleader (born 1938).
- 8 – Herbie Lovelle, American drummer (born 1924).
- 12 – Zeke Zarchy, American trumpeter (born 1915).
- 16 – Viktor Paskov, Bulgarian writer, singer, musicologist, and screenwriter (born 1949).
- 29 – Tom McGrath, Scottish playwright and pianist (born 1940).

May

- 14 – Buddy Montgomery, American jazz vibraphonist and pianist (born 1930).
- 15 – Wayman Tisdale, American basketball player and bass guitarist (born 1964).
- 21 – Uli Trepte, German upright bassist (born 1941).

June

- 3
  - Koko Taylor, American singer (born 1928).
  - Sam Butera, American tenor saxophonist (born 1927).
- 7
  - Hugh Hopper, British bass guitarist (born 1945).
  - Kenny Rankin, American singer and songwriter (born 1940).
- 10 – Jack Nimitz, American baritone saxophonist (born 1930).
- 11 – Jarmo Savolainen, Finnish pianist and composer (born 1961).
- 16
  - Charlie Mariano, American saxophonist (born 1923).
  - Tina Marsh, American jazz singer and composer (cancer) (born 1954).
- 22 – Eddie Preston, American jazz trumpeter (born 1925).
- 23 – Raymond Berthiaume, Canadian singer, producer, and composer (born 1931).

July

- 4 – Jim Chapin, American drummer (born 1919).
- 22 – Sonny Dallas, American bassist and singer (born 1931).
- 27 – George Russell, American jazz pianist, composer, arranger, and theorist (born 1923).

August

- 11 – Kitty White, American singer (born 1923).
- 12 – Rashied Ali, American drummer (born 1933).
- 13 – Les Paul, American jazz guitarist and inventor of solid-body electric guitar, and multi-track recording (born 1915).
- 24 – Joe Maneri, American composer, saxophonist, and clarinetist (born 1927).
- 29 – Chris Connor, American jazz singer (born 1927).
- 31 – Eddie Higgins, American pianist, composer, and orchestrator (born 1932).

September

- 7 – Eddie Locke, American jazz drummer (born 1930).
- 8 – Luther Thomas, American alto saxophonist and multi-instrumentalist (born 1950).
- 14 – Bobby Graham, English session drummer, composer, arranger, and record producer (born 1940).
- 15 – Nunzio Rotondo, Italian trumpeter and bandleader (born 1924).

October

- 8 – Abu Talib, African-American guitarist (born 1939).
- 10 – Sonny Bradshaw, Jamaican bandleader, trumpeter, broadcaster, and promoter (born 1926).
- 13
  - Al Martino, American singer and actor (born 1927).
  - Winston Mankunku Ngozi, South African tenor saxophonist (born 1943).
- 14 – Jerry van Rooyen, Dutch trumpeter, conductor, and composer (born 1928).
- 21 – Sirone, American bassist and composer (born 1940).

November

- 6 – Kjell Bartholdsen, Norwegian saxophonist (stroke) (born 1938).
- 10 – Dick Katz, American pianist, arranger, and record producer (born 1924).
- 16 – Jeff Clyne, British bassist (born 1937).
- 20 – Billy James, American drummer (born 1936).
- 21 – Gerhard Aspheim, Norwegian trombonist (born 1930).
- 22 – Haydain Neale, Canadian singer-songwriter (born 1970).
- 24 – Hale Smith, American composer, pianist, educator, arranger, and editor (born 1925).
- 26 – Pia Beck, Dutch pianist and singer (born 1925).

December

- 8 – Su Cruickshank, Australian singer, actress, and writer (born 1946).
- 16 – Terry Pollard, American pianist and vibraphonist (born 1931).
- 20 – Pete King, British tenor saxophonist(born 1929).
- 25 – Rusty Dedrick, American trumpeter and composer (born 1918).

Unknown date

- Pocho Lapouble, Argentine drummer, composer and arranger (born 1942).

== See also ==
- List of 2009 albums
- List of years in jazz
- 2000s in jazz
- 2009 in music
