= 2011 in jazz =

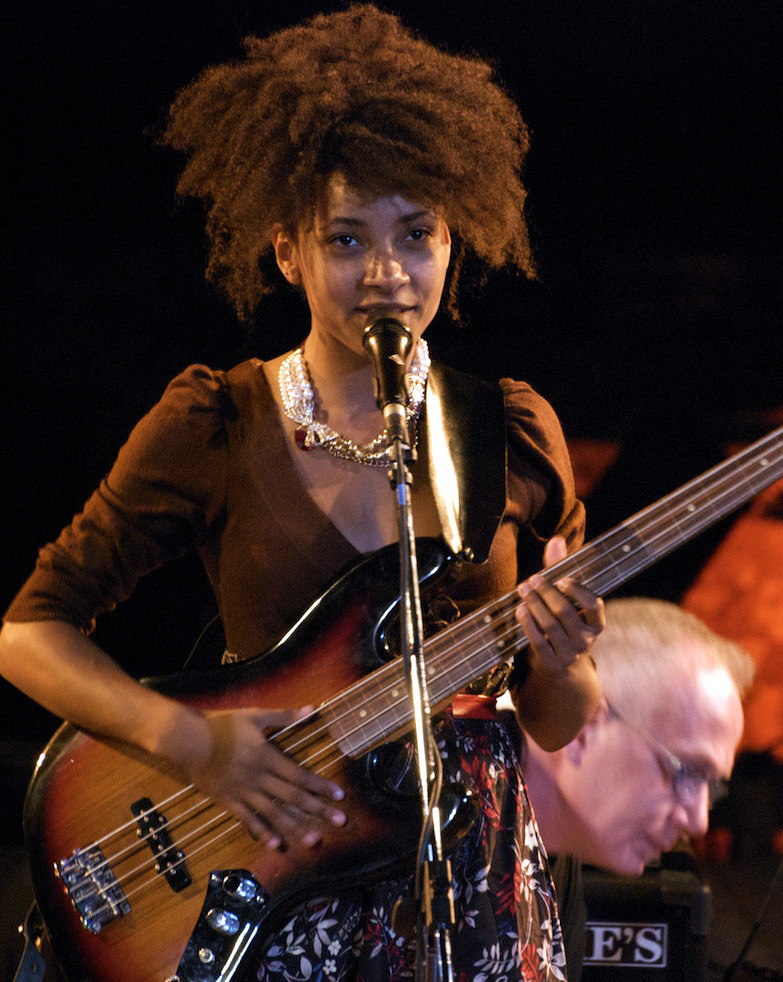
- Esperanza Spalding, who won Best New Artist in the 2011 Grammy Awards
- Decade: 2010s in jazz
- Music: 2011 in music
- Standards: List of jazz standards
- See also: 2010 in jazz – 2012 in jazz

This is a timeline documenting events of Jazz in the year 2011.

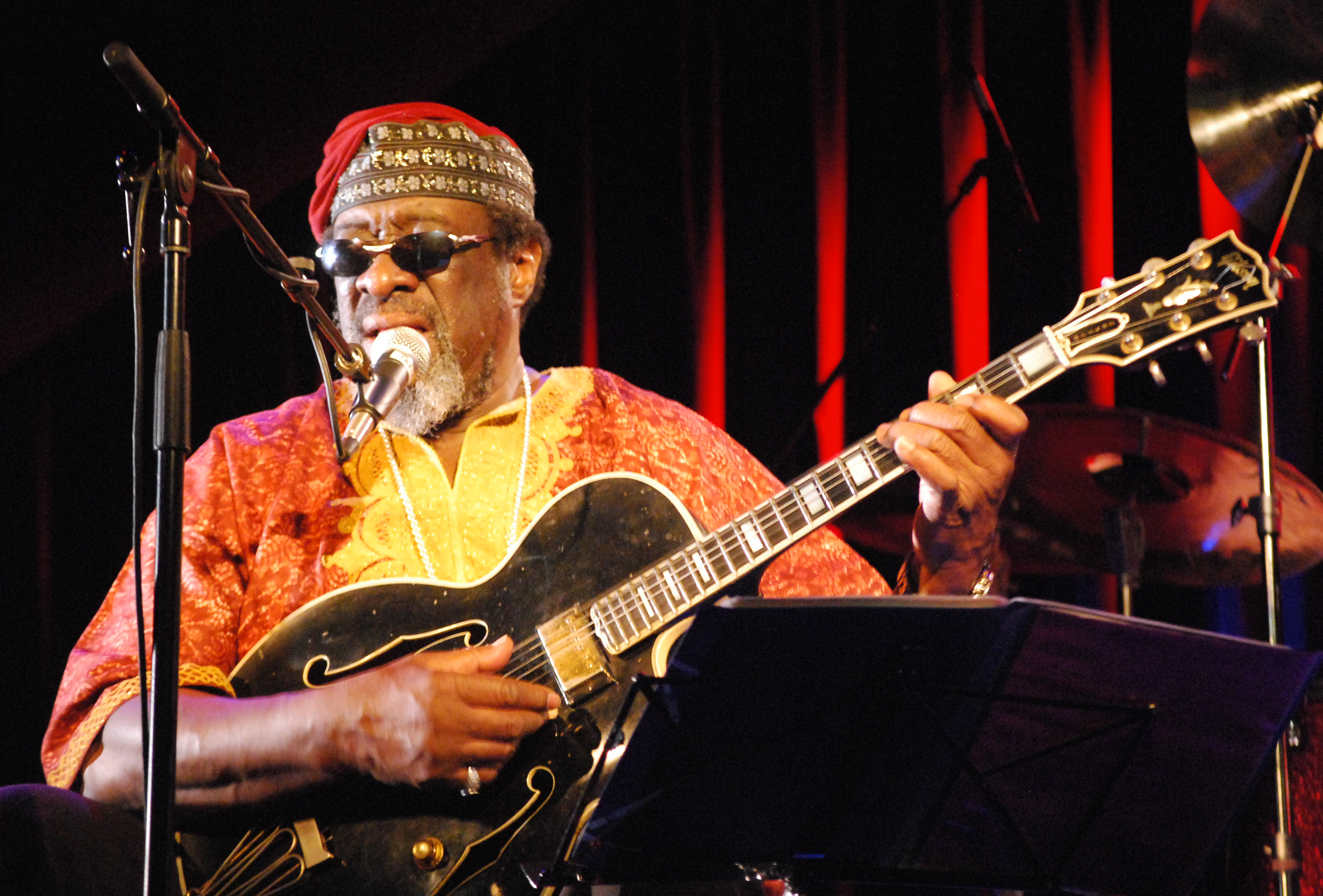
James Blood Ulmer Innsbruck 2011.

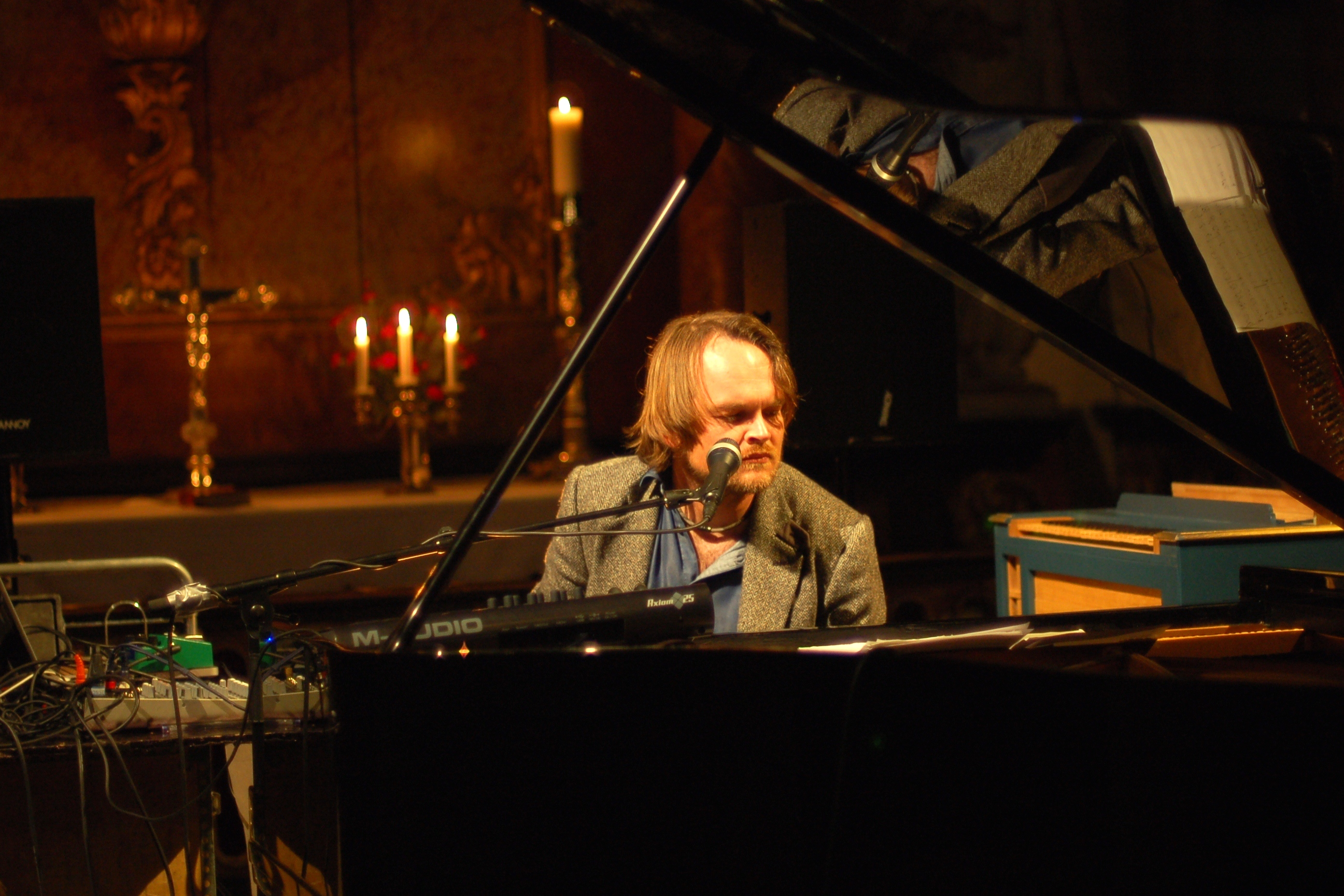
Morten Qvenild solo concert 2011.

== Events ==
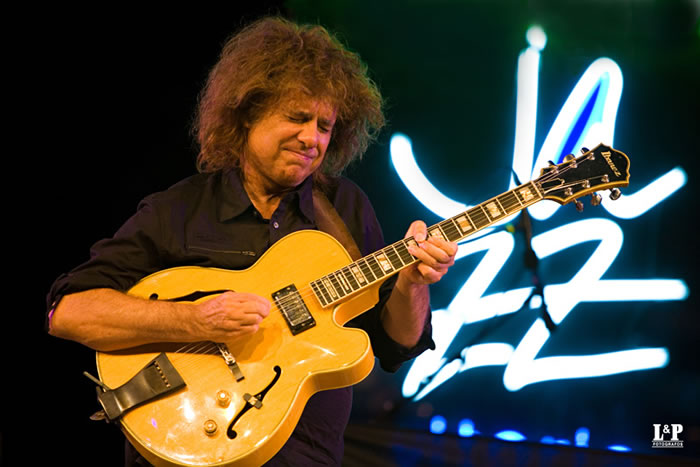
Pat Metheny at Jazzvitoria 2011.

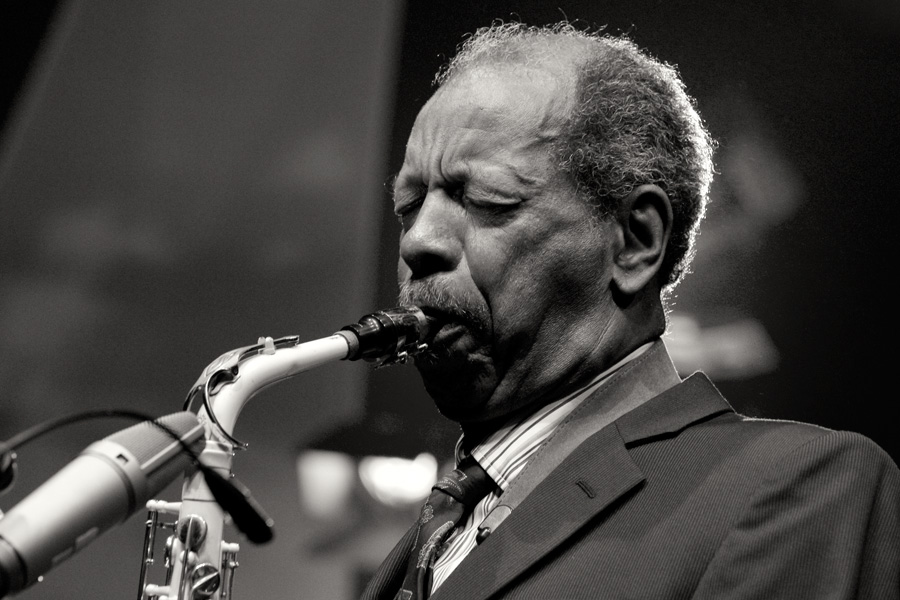
Ornette Coleman at Moers Festival 2011.

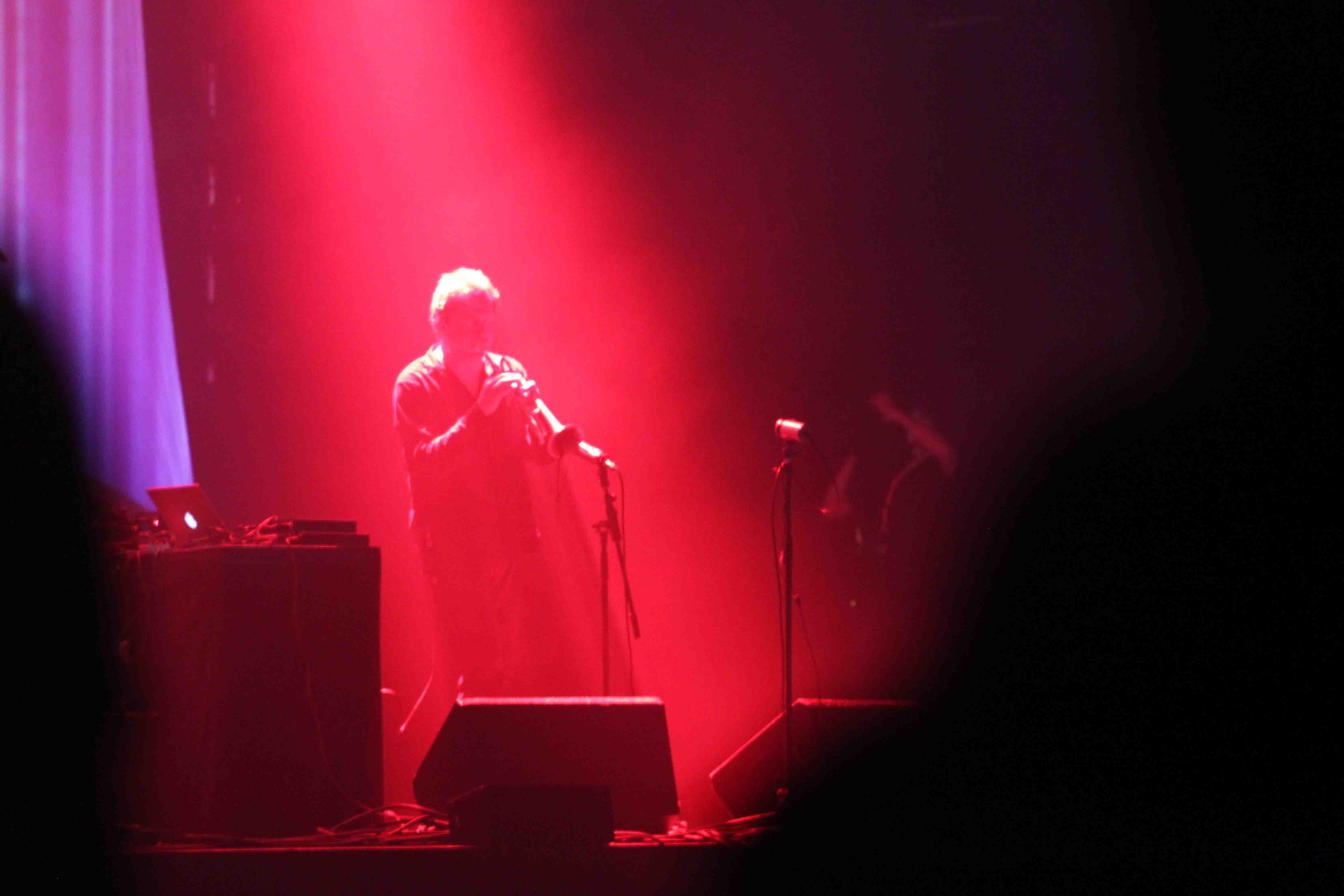
Nils Petter Molvær at Moers Festival 2011.

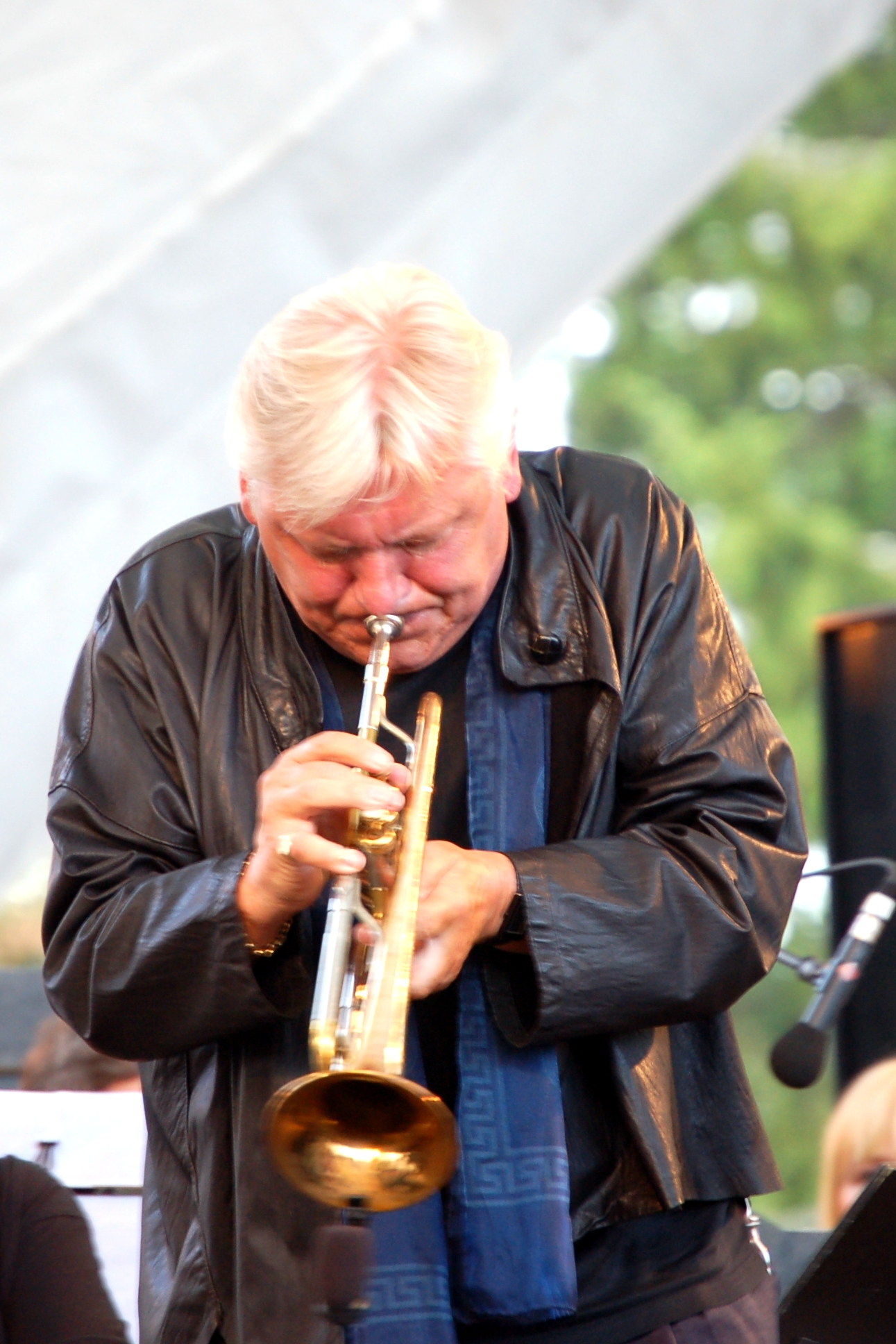
Palle Mikkelborg at Kongsberg Jazzfestival 2011.

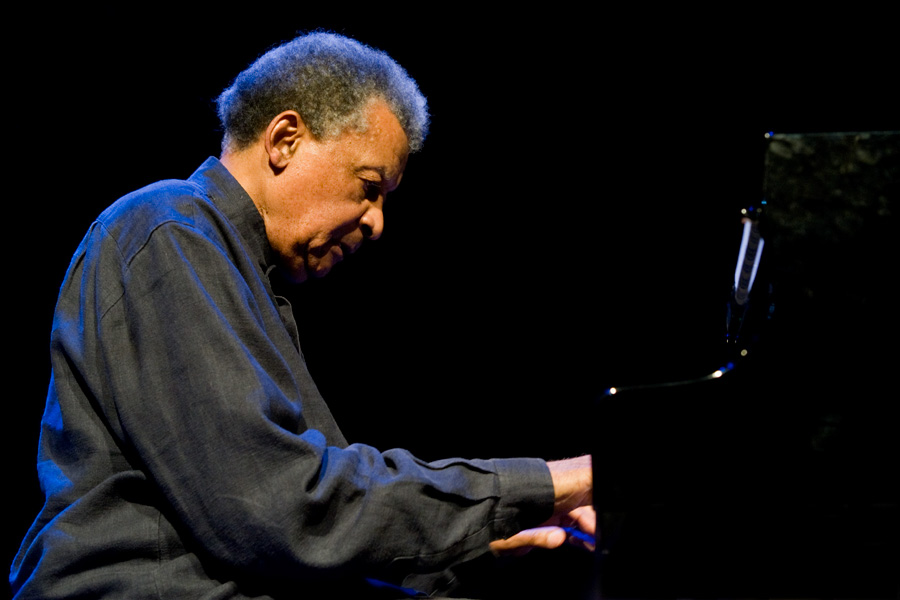
Abdullah Ibrahim at Moers Festival 2011.

=== January ===
- 20 – The 6th Ice Music Festival started in Geilo, Norway (January 20 – 23).
- 26 – The first Bodø Jazz Open started in Bodø, Norway (January 26 – 29).

=== February ===
- 3 – The 13th Polarjazz Festival started in Longyearbyen, Svalbard (February 3 – 7).

=== March ===
- 4 – The 7th Jakarta International Java Jazz Festival started in Jakarta, Indonesia (March 4 – 6).

=== April ===
- 15 – The 38th Vossajazz started in Voss, Norway (April 15 – 17).
- 16
  - Mari Kvien Brunvoll was awarded Vossajazzprisen 2011.
  - Mathias Eick performed the commissioned work Voss at Vossajazz
- 27 – The 17th SoddJazz started in Inderøy, Norway (April 27 – May 1).
- 30 – The International Jazz Day.

=== May ===
- Sons of Kemet is formed by members Shabaka Hutchings, Seb Rochford, Tom Skinner, Theon Cross, and Eddie Hick
- 25 – The 39th Nattjazz started in Bergen, Norway (May 25 – June 4).

=== June ===
- 10 – The 40th Moers Festival started in Moers, Germany (June 10 – 11).
- 15 – The 23rd Jazz Fest Wien started in Vienna, Austria (June 15 – July 17).
- 17 – The 28th Stockholm Jazz Festival started in Stockholm, Sweden (June 17 – 19).
- 25 – The 31st Montreal International Jazz Festival started in Montreal, Quebec, Canada (June 25 – July 4).

=== July ===
- 1
  - The 33rd Copenhagen Jazz Festival started in Copenhagen, Denmark (July 1 – 10).
  - The 45th Montreux Jazz Festival started in Montreux, Switzerland (July 1 – 16).
- 6 – The 47th Kongsberg Jazzfestival started in Kongsberg, Norway (July 6 – 9).
- 8
  - The 36th North Sea Jazz Festival started in The Hague, Netherlands (July 8 – 10).
  - The 64th Nice Jazz Festival started in Nice, France (July 8 – 12).
- 9 – The 46th Pori Jazz Festival started in Pori, Finland (July 9 – 17).
- 18 – The 51st Moldejazz started in Molde, Norway (July 18 – 23).
- 21 – The 46th San Sebastian Jazz Festival started in San Sebastian, Spain (July 21 – 25).

=== August ===
- 5 – The 55th Newport Jazz Festival started in Newport, Rhode Island (August 5 – 7).
- 10 – The 25th Sildajazz started in Haugesund, Norway (August 10–14).
- 12
  - Marius Neset is awarded the Sildajazzprisen 2011.
  - The 27th Brecon Jazz Festival started in Brecon, Wales (August 12 – 14).
- 15 – The 26th Oslo Jazzfestival started in Oslo, Norway (August 15 – 20).

=== September ===
- 1 – The 7th Punktfestivalen started in Kristiansand, Norway (September 1 – 3).
- 16 – The 54th Monterey Jazz Festival started in Monterey, California (September 16 – 18).

=== November ===
- 11 – 20th London Jazz Festival started in London, England (November 11 – 20).

=== December ===
- 18 – Eldbjørg Raknes was awarded the Norwegian jazz award Buddyprisen 2011.

== Album released ==
Month	Day	Album	Artist	Label	Notes	Ref.
January	11	Méditerranées	Renaud Garcia-Fons	Enja Records		
January	12	Come Sunday	Charlie Haden and Hank Jones	EmArcy Records	Produced by Jean-Philippe Allard, Ruth Cameron, Charlie Haden	
January	18	Before the Rain	Noah Preminger			
February	7	The Gate	Kurt Elling	Concord Records	Nominated for Grammy Award for Best Jazz Vocal Album at the 54th Annual Grammy Awards	
February	22	New History Warfare, Vol. 2: Judges	Colin Stetson			
March	1	Field Day Rituals	Splashgirl	Hubro Music		
March	11	Elastics	Ole Mathisen, Per Mathisen and Paolo Vinaccia	Losen Records		
March	18	Jeg Vil Hjem Til Menneskene	Susanna Wallumrød	Grappa Music	lyrics by Gunvor Hofmo	
April	5	The Lost and Found	Gretchen Parlato		Produced by Gretchen Parlato and Robert Glasper	
April	18	Lines of Oppression	Ari Hoenig		with Gilad Hekselman, Tigran Hamasyan, Orlando le Fleming, and Chris Tordini	
May	2	A Moment's Peace	John Scofield	EmArcy Records		
June	26	What's It All About	Pat Metheny	Nonesuch Records		
August	30	Alma Adentro: The Puerto Rican Songbook	Miguel Zenón		Nominated for the Grammy Award for Best Large Jazz Ensemble Album at the 54th Annual Grammy Awards	

== Deaths ==
January

- 1 – Charles Fambrough, American bassist, composer, and record producer (born 1950).
- 27 – Charlie Callas, American drummer, comedian, and actor (born 1924).
- 29 – Milton Babbitt, American composer, music theorist, and teacher (born 1916).

February

- 3 – Tony Levin, English jazz drummer (born 1940).
- 8 – Eugenio Toussaint, Mexican composer, arranger, and musician (born 1954).
- 14 – George Shearing, British jazz pianist (born 1919).
- 24 – Jens Winther, Danish jazz trumpeter, composer, and bandleader (born 1960).

March

- 4 – Tom Vaughn, American pianist (born 1936).
- 11 – Billy Bang, American violinist and composer (born 1947).
- 12 – Joe Morello, American drummer (born 1928).
- 15 – Melvin Sparks, American guitarist (born 1946).

April

- 26 – Phoebe Snow, American singer, songwriter, and guitarist (born 1950).

May

- 8 – Cornell Dupree, American guitarist (born 1942).
- 10 – Norma Zimmer, American singer (born 1923).
- 11 – Snooky Young, American trumpeter (born 1919).
- 12 – Ted Nash, American saxophonist, flautist, and clarinetist (born 1922).
- 15 – Bob Flanigan, American tenor vocalist and founding member of The Four Freshmen (born 1926).
- 28 – Alys Robi, French-Canadian singer (born 1923).

June

- 2 – Ray Bryant, American pianist and composer (born 1931).
- 3 – Jack Kevorkian, American flautist, composer, pathologist, and euthanasia proponent (born 1928).
- 10 – György Szabados, Hungarian jazz pianist (born 1939).
- 20 – Ottilie Patterson, Northern Irish singer (born 1932).

July

- 2 – Paul Weeden, American-born Norwegian jazz guitarist (born 1923)
- 17 – Joe Lee Wilson, American singer (born 1935).
- 23 – Amy Winehouse, English singer and songwriter (born 1983).
- 24 – Harald Johnsen, Norwegian bassist (heart attack) (born 1970).
- 26 – Frank Foster, American tenor and soprano saxophonist, flautist, arranger, and composer (born 1928).

August

- 7 – Jiří Traxler, Czech-Canadian pianist, composer, lyricist, and arranger (born 1912).

September

- 7 – Eddie Marshall, American drummer (born 1938).
- 9 – Graham Collier, English bassist, bandleader, and composer (born 1937).
- 12 – Dinah Kaye, Scottish singer (born 1924).
- 19 – Johnny Răducanu, Romanian pianist (born 1931).

October

- 1 – Butch Ballard, American drummer (born 1918).
- 8 – Roger Williams, American pianist (born 1924).
- 10 – Lucy Ann Polk, American singer (born 1927).
- 19 – Lars Sjösten, Swedish pianist and composer (born 1941).
- 28 – Beryl Davis, English singer (born 1924).
- 29 – Walter Norris, American pianist and composer (born 1931).

November

- 1
  - André Hodeir, French violinist, composer, arranger, and musicologist (born 1921).
  - Christiane Legrand, French soprano, The Swingle Singers (born 1930).
- 2 – Papa Bue, Danish trombonist and bandleader (born 1930).
- 6 – Gordon Beck, English pianist and composer (born 1935).
- 11 – Michael Garrick, English pianist and composer (born 1933).
- 19 – Russell Garcia, American composer and music arranger (born 1916).
- 22 – Paul Motian, American drummer (born 1931).
- 24 – Ross McManus, Irish-English trumpeter (born 1927).

December

- 2 – Bill Tapia, American guitarist (born 1908).
- 15 – Bob Brookmeyer, American valve trombonist, pianist, and composer (born 1929).
- 17 – Cesária Évora, Cape Verdean singer (born 1941).
- 18 – Ralph MacDonald, Trinbagonian-American percussionist, songwriter, and steelpan virtuoso (born 1941).
- 26 – Sam Rivers, American saxophonist, bass clarinetist, flautist, harmonica player and pianist, and composer (born 1923).

== See also ==
- List of 2011 albums
- List of years in jazz
- 2010s in jazz
- 2011 in music
