= Dave Black (drummer) =

American jazz musician

David Black (January 23, 1928 in Philadelphia – December 4, 2006) was an American jazz drummer who is most notable for his work with Duke Ellington from 1953 to 1955. Prior to that, Black had been the drummer in the house band at the Philadelphia Blue Note Jazz Club where he played with the likes of Charlie Parker, Buddy DeFranco and Zoot Sims. In 1955 Black contracted polio and left the Duke Ellington Orchestra. After recovering, he moved to the San Francisco Bay Area and partnered with Bob Scobey until the latter's death in 1963. Dave Black continued to perform with Bay Area and various international jazz musicians until his death in 2006.
