= Al Belletto =

American jazz musician

- Born: January 3, 1928; New Orleans, Louisiana, U.S.
- Died: December 26, 2014 (aged 86) Metairie, Louisiana, U.S.
- Genre: Jazz
- Instruments: Clarinet, saxophone

Al Belletto (January 3, 1928 – December 26, 2014) was an American jazz saxophonist and clarinetist.

== Early life and education ==
Belletto was born and raised in New Orleans, where he led his own bands as a college student. He graduated from Warren Easton Charter High School before studying music at Loyola University New Orleans and earning a master's degree from Louisiana State University.

== Career ==
Belletto played with Sharkey Bonano, Louis Prima, Wingy Manone and the Dukes of Dixieland in the 1940s and 1950s, then led his own band for several albums on Capitol Records from 1952. He and his ensemble became part of Woody Herman's band for United States Department of State tours of South America in 1958 and 1959.

In the 1960s, Belletto worked at the New Orleans Playboy Club fronting the house band and serving as Musical/Entertainment Director, booking nationally known acts into the venue.

== Personal life ==
Belletto and his wife, Linda, had one son. Belletto died in Metairie, Louisiana, in 2014.

== Discography ==
- Sounds and Songs (Capitol Records, 1955)
- Half and Half (Capitol, 1956)
- Whisper Not (Capitol, 1957)
- The Big Sound (King Records, 1962)
- Coach's Choice (ART Records, 1973)
- Jazznocracy (Louisiana Red Hot, 1998)
