= Alan Littlejohn =

British musician

Alan Littlejohn (4 January 1928 – 12 November 1996) was a British jazz trumpeter, flugelhornist and bandleader born in London, England, most notable for his work with artists such as Ben Webster, Earl Hines, Bill Coleman, Sonny Dee, Laurie Chescoe, Alvin Roy, and Billy Butterfield.
