= Bucky Calabrese =

American upright bassist

Bucky Calabrese (8 June 1927 - 6 May 1995), was an American upright bassist.

== Life and career ==
Born Frederick Philip in Hicksville, New York, Calabrese was trained at the Hartnett School of Music and privately with Charles Mingus and Clyde Lombardi. In 1957 he played with Ray Eberle and Dizzy Gillespie. He then performed with Sal Salvador (1958) and Kai Winding (1959). In 1962 he toured and recorded with Stan Kenton, and in 1963 he performed with Edmond Hall and his dixieland band in New York City. He remained in New York City in 1964 and 1965, performing in bands led by Eddie Condon and Max Kaminsky. In 1968 he performed in a duo with pianist Teddy Wilson, and in the early 1970s he performed in a trio with pianist Dave McKenna. In his later career he performed and recorded with Doc Cheatham.

== Discography (in selection) ==
- 1962: Adventures In Time, A Concerto For Orchestra (Capitol Records), with Stan Kenton.
- 1972: From Puerto Rico To Soulsville (Zanzee), with Ray Rivera
- 1973: Cookin' At Michael's Pub (Halcyon Records), with Dave McKenna
- 1986: Where Have You Been? (DRG Records), with Elisabeth Welch
- 1987: Live At The West End Cafe New York City (Bean Records), with Pete Compo Jazz Violin Quartet
- 1992: The Eighty-Seven Years Of Doc Cheatham (Columbia), with Doc Cheatham
- 1996: More Mellophonium Moods (Status), with Stan Kenton and his Orchestra
- 1996: Alternate Routes (Tantara Productions), with Ray Starling, New York Neophonic Orchestra, Joel Kaye, New York Sound Stage One Orchestra
- 2010: This Is An Orchestra! (Tantara Productions), with Stan Kenton
- 2014: Horns Of Plenty, Vol. 3 (Tantara Productions), with Stan Kenton Orchestra and Trinity Big Band
- 2017: Mellophonium Memoirs (Tantara Productions), with Stan Kenton Orchestra
