= Frank Parr (musician) =

English cricketer and jazz musician

Personal information
- Full name: Francis David Parr
- Born: 1 June 1928; Wallasey, Cheshire, England
- Died: 8 May 2012 (aged 83); Hampstead Hospice, Middlesex, England
- Batting: Left-handed
- Role: Wicketkeeper

Domestic team information
- Years: Team
- 1951–1954: Lancashire

Career statistics
| Competition | First-class |
|---|---|
| Matches | 49 |
| Runs scored | 507 |
| Batting average | 12.07 |
| 100s/50s | 0/0 |
| Top score | 42 |
| Catches/stumpings | 71/20 |
- Source: Cricinfo, 8 May 2012

Francis David Parr (1 June 1928 – 8 May 2012) was an English cricketer who played for Lancashire and a jazz trombonist with the Mick Mulligan Band.

== Early life ==
Parr was born at Wallasey and went to the local grammar school, where as well as showing promise as a cricketer he was a fine athlete. While still at school he began playing the trombone with the Merseysippi Jazz Band.

== Cricket ==
Parr played first-class cricket for Lancashire as a wicketkeeper and a lower-order batsman, in his career of 49 matches spanning from 1951 to 1954. Bert Strudwick said that he was "the most promising keeper I've seen in years", and in 1952 he was tipped to play for England. At the end of the following season, he was almost selected for that winter's tour of the West Indies.

His Lancashire teammate Brian Statham described him as "an arty, untidy type who looked what he was, a spare-time musician". Lancashire's captain, Nigel Howard, had been prepared to overlook Parr's scruffiness and laid-back approach, but in 1954 Cyril Washbrook took over the captaincy. A stricter disciplinarian than Howard, Washbrook insisted on tidier dress and better behaviour from his side, and dropped Parr after only five matches. Worcestershire offered Parr a job, but withdrew after Washbrook wrote to warn them against employing him, saying that he could be "a grave social risk". That marked the end of his cricket career. Parr himself said: "I thought it was the end of the world. It's probably why I took up serious drinking." In his book Owning Up, George Melly, who performed with him in the Mick Mulligan Band, wrote that Parr's fellow band members never learned the reason for his quarrel with Washbrook, but that "after a month or two in his company we realised it must have been inevitable". He also wrote that Parr "was an extreme social rebel" who "concealed a formidable and well-read intelligence behind a stylised oafishness".

== Music ==
Having played with the Merseysippi Jazz Band for six years, in 1956 Parr joined the Mick Mulligan Band as a full-time professional musician and moved to London. By the late 1950s, he had become a fine trombonist, though Melly said that his music was "aimed beyond his technique. Sometimes a very beautiful idea came off, more often you were aware of a beautiful idea which existed in Frank's head." The band's performances often suffered from the effects of alcohol, and Parr himself was often drunk.

The band's style of revivalist "trad" jazz was becoming less popular by the end of the 1950s. In 1961 it disbanded, and Parr's career as a performer ended. He was Acker Bilk's manager for ten years, and subsequently worked in advertising. Later he had small parts in television shows and films, including The King's Speech (2010).

He remained a cricket enthusiast, captaining a team of jazz musicians called The Ravers and attending Lancashire Players' Association functions at Old Trafford.
