= Charlie Kennedy (saxophonist) =

American musician (1927–2009)

- Born: Charles Sumner Kennedy; July 2, 1927; Staten Island, New York, U.S.
- Died: April 3, 2009 (aged 81) Ventura, California, U.S.
- Genres: Jazz, big band
- Instruments: Alto saxophone

Charles Sumner Kennedy (July 2, 1927 – April 3, 2009) was an American big band-era alto saxophonist.

== Early life ==
Kennedy was born on Staten Island in New York City.

== Career ==
Kennedy played with Louis Prima's big band orchestra in the 1940s. He performed a solo on that band's 1943 recording of "The White Cliffs of Dover". After a brief stint in his own band, he joined Gene Krupa's big band.

Over the course of his career, he also played with Terry Gibbs's Dream Band, as well as Charlie Ventura, Flip Phillips, Chico O'Farrill, and Bill Holman.

In addition to live performances and recordings with big-name bands, he also was a frequent studio musician. He played in the orchestras for popular movies including My Fair Lady and West Side Story.

== Personal life ==
In the 1970s, for more stable income to support his family with six children, he gave up his career as a full-time musician, but continued to perform in clubs near his home in southern California. He died of pulmonary disease in Ventura, California, at the age of 81.

== Discography ==
=== As leader ===
- Crazy Rhythms with Charlie Ventura (Regent, 1957)

=== As sideman ===
With Terry Gibbs

- Launching a New Band (Mercury, 1959)
- More Vibes On Velvet (Mercury, 1959)
- Swing Is Here! (Verve, 1960)
- The Exciting Terry Gibbs Big Band (Verve, 1961)
- Explosion! (Mercury, 1962)
- Dream Band (Contemporary, 1986)
- Volume Two The Sundown Sessions (Contemporary, 1987)
- Flying Home Volume 3 (Contemporary, 1988)
- The Big Cat Volume 5 (Contemporary, 1991)
- Main Stem Volume 4 (Contemporary, 2002)
- One More Time Vol. 6 (Contemporary, 2002)

With Bill Holman

- In a Jazz Orbit (Andex, 1958)
- The Fabulous Bill Holman (Coral, 1958)
- Bill Holman's Great Big Band (Mercury, 1960)

With Gene Krupa

- Gene Krupa's Sidekicks (Columbia, 1955)
- Gene Krupa Plays Gerry Mulligan Arrangements (Verve, 1958)
- Drummin' Man (Columbia, 1963)

With others

- June Christy, Big Band Specials (Mercury, 1962)
- Med Flory, Jazz Wave (Jubilee, 1958)
- Dizzy Gillespie, The New Continent (Limelight, 1965)
- Neal Hefti, Jazz Pops (Reprise, 1962)
- Chubby Jackson, Sextet And Big Band (Prestige, 1969)
- Shelly Manne, My Fair Lady with the Un-original Cast (Mercury, 1964)
- Anita O'Day, Swings Cole Porter with Billy May (Verve, 1959)
- Anita O'Day, Incomparable (Verve, 1964)
- Chico O'Farrill, Cuban Blues: The Chico O'Farrill Sessions (Verve, 1996)
- Art Pepper, Art Pepper + Eleven Modern Jazz Classics (Contemporary, 1959)
- Flip Phillips, Swinging With Flip (Clef, 1956)
- Zoot Sims, Good Old Zoot (New Jazz, 1963)
