= 2020 in jazz =

- Decade: 2020s in jazz
- Music: 2020 in music
- Standards: List of jazz standards
- See also: 2019 in jazz – 2021 in jazz

This is a timeline documenting events of jazz in the year 2020.

== Events ==
=== May ===
- May 6 – Gregory Porter's brother Lloyd dies of COVID-19, two months after the singer is forced to interrupt his world tour by the pandemic.

=== June ===
- June 26 - Immanuel Wilkins signs with Blue Note Records

=== August ===
- August 6-8 – The Newport Jazz Festival is replaced by a programme of virtual events created by founder George Wein.

== Albums ==
| Month | Day | Album | Artist | Label | Notes | Ref. |
|---|---|---|---|---|---|---|
| January | 17 | Is That So? | John McLaughlin (musician), Shankar Mahadevan, Zakir Hussain (musician) | Abstract Logix | | |
| February | 14 | Life Goes On | Carla Bley, Andy Sheppard, Steve Swallow | ECM Records | | |
| February | 21 | From This Place | Pat Metheny | Nonesuch Records | | |
| March | 20 | Elegant Traveller | Jocelyn Gould | | | |
| March | 20 | Rejoice | Hugh Masekela and Tony Allen | World Circuit | Masekela died in 2018 | |
| March | 27 | Big Vicious | Avishai Cohen (trumpeter) | ECM Records | | |
| March | 27 | Pursuance : The Coltranes | Lakecia Benjamin | Ropeadope Records | | |
| April | 10 | Iron Starlet | Connie Han | Mack Avenue Records | | |
| June | 12 | Angels Around | Kurt Rosenwinkel | | | |
| June | 20 | Swallow Tales | John Scofield and Steve Swallow | ECM Records | | |
| July | 10 | RoundAgain | Joshua Redman, Brad Mehldau, Christian McBride and Brian Blade | Nonesuch | | |
| August | 7 | Just Coolin' | Art Blakey, The Jazz Messengers | Blue Note Records | recorded in 1959. | |
| August | 14 | Omega | Immanuel Wilkins | Blue Note Records | | |
| August | 21 | Source | Nubya Garcia | Concord | | |
| August | 28 | The Call Within | Tigran Hamasyan | Nonesuch | | |
| August | 28 | Axiom | Chief Xian aTunde Adjuah | Ropeadope Records | | |
| September | 11 | Artemis | Artemis (Renee Rosnes, Cécile McLorin Salvant, Anat Cohen, Melissa Aldana, Ingrid Jensen, Noriko Ueda, Allison Miller) | Blue Note Records | | |
| September | 23 | Van | Clown Core | | Songs released individually initially | |
| October | 30 | Artlessly Falling | Mary Halvorson's Code Girl | | | |

== Deaths ==
- January 10 – Wolfgang Dauner, 84, German jazz pianist
- February 10 – Lyle Mays, 66, American jazz fusion keyboardist (Pat Metheny Group)
- February 16 – Graeme Allwright, 93, New Zealand-French folk and jazz singer-songwriter
- February 18 – Jon Christensen, 76m Norwegian jazz drummer
- March 2 – Susan Weinert, 54, German jazz fusion guitarist (cancer)
- March 6 – McCoy Tyner, 81, American jazz pianist
- March 10 – Marcelo Peralta, 59, Argentine jazz saxophonist (COVID-19)
- April 1 - Ellis Marsalis, Jr., 85, American jazz pianist and educator
- April 15 - Lee Konitz, 92, American jazz saxophonist
- October 17 – Toshinori Kondo, 71, Japanese jazz and jazz fusion trumpeter
- October 31 – Marc Fosset, 71, French jazz guitarist
- November 1 – Pedro Iturralde, 91, Spanish jazz saxophonist
- November 7 – Cándido Camero, 99, Cuban jazz percussionist
- November 11 – Andrew White, 78, American jazz saxophonist
- November 26 – Allan Botschinsky, 80, Danish jazz trumpeter
- December 30 – Eugene Wright, 97, American jazz bassist (Dave Brubeck Quartet)

== See also ==
- List of 2020 albums
- List of jazz festivals
- List of years in jazz
- 2020s in jazz
- 2020 in music
