= Bob Badgley =

American jazz musician (1928–2012)

Robert L. "Bob" Badgley (June 23, 1928, in Detroit – February 24, 2012, in Las Vegas) was an American jazz double-bassist.

Badgley learned piano from age six and played trombone in high school. He served in the United States Army from 1946 to 1953 in Berlin, where he played in bands (one of which included Chet Baker. After his discharge he worked on the West Coast, playing with Virgil Gonsalves in the San Francisco Bay Area, and then with Dick Stabile, Maynard Ferguson, Tommy Gumina, Bobby Troup, and Matty Matlock in southern California in the late 1960s. He toured worldwide with Julie Andrews in the late 1960s and played Las Vegas with Julie London in 1971. Late in the 1970s he toured with Frank Sinatra and was a member of Bob Florence's trio from 1979 to 1986 (which accompanied Sue Raney among others). He toured and recorded several times with Joe Williams (1984-1990), and moved to Las Vegas later in the 1990s, where he taught at the University of Nevada-Las Vegas.
