= John Brimhall =

American musical arranger and author

John Brimhall (November 22, 1928 – December 2, 2003) was an American musical arranger and author of books on music composition, theory, and performance.

== Career ==
Brimhall is perhaps best known for his easy arrangements of classical and American popular music for piano students.

He studied at Loyola University, the University of San Francisco and Stanford University. Brimhall is thought to be the most published arranger of printed music in history, having sold over 75 million copies of over 500 books. His books are also published in Braille.

Brimhall pioneered the "Bach to the Beatles with Brimhall" approach to music education, which became a global success by enabling beginning pianists to play the music of the Beatles while learning the classical lessons of musical theory.

Brimhall's books have been used by piano teachers for over 50 years and he has contributed immensely to the arrangements available to beginning students of piano, making classical and popular piano music accessible to those with limited skills and blindness. His 1800+ titles in the Library of Congress include piano and organ methods for all ages, popular and classical music arrangements, theory books, and choir and choral arrangements.
