= Werner Dies =

German musician

Werner Dies (January 15, 1928, Frankfurt - February 5, 2003) was a German jazz tenor saxophonist, clarinetist, guitarist, composer, and arranger.

Dies was an autodidact on guitar and saxophone, and studied clarinet and composition starting in 1947. From 1947 to 1955 he played guitar in the dance band of Willy Berking, and was a member of the bands Hotclub Combo and Two Beat Stompers. He also led his own ensemble, which went on a tour of Yugoslavia in 1955. From 1955 to 1965 he was a member of Hazy Osterwald's sextet, and also worked as a session musician and arranger. He toured with Joe Turner and, in 1968, Charly Antolini.

He had a hit in Germany in 1954 with "Schuster bleib bei deinen Leisten", the German-language version of the song "The Little Shoemaker". This spent eight weeks at #1 on the German hit parade starting in October 1954. He also wrote a treatise on clarinet improvisation, published by Schott in 1967. He later worked for Howard Carpendale, Adam & Eve, Graham Bonney, and other singers, and produced easy listening music with his own ensemble, the Werner Dies Sax Band. He produced the group Bläck Fööss from 1973 to 2003.
