= Jazz Fest Wien =

Annual Jazz festival in Vienna, Austria

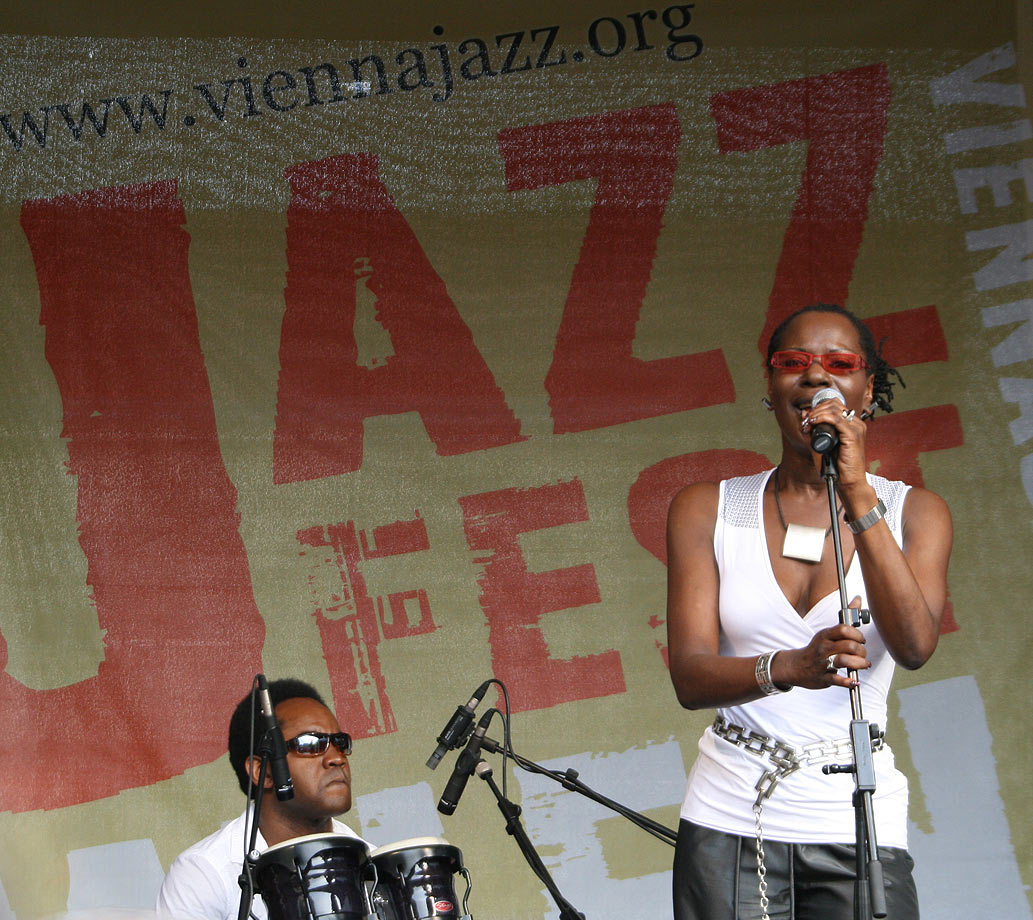
Dorretta Carter (Museumsquartier, 2007)

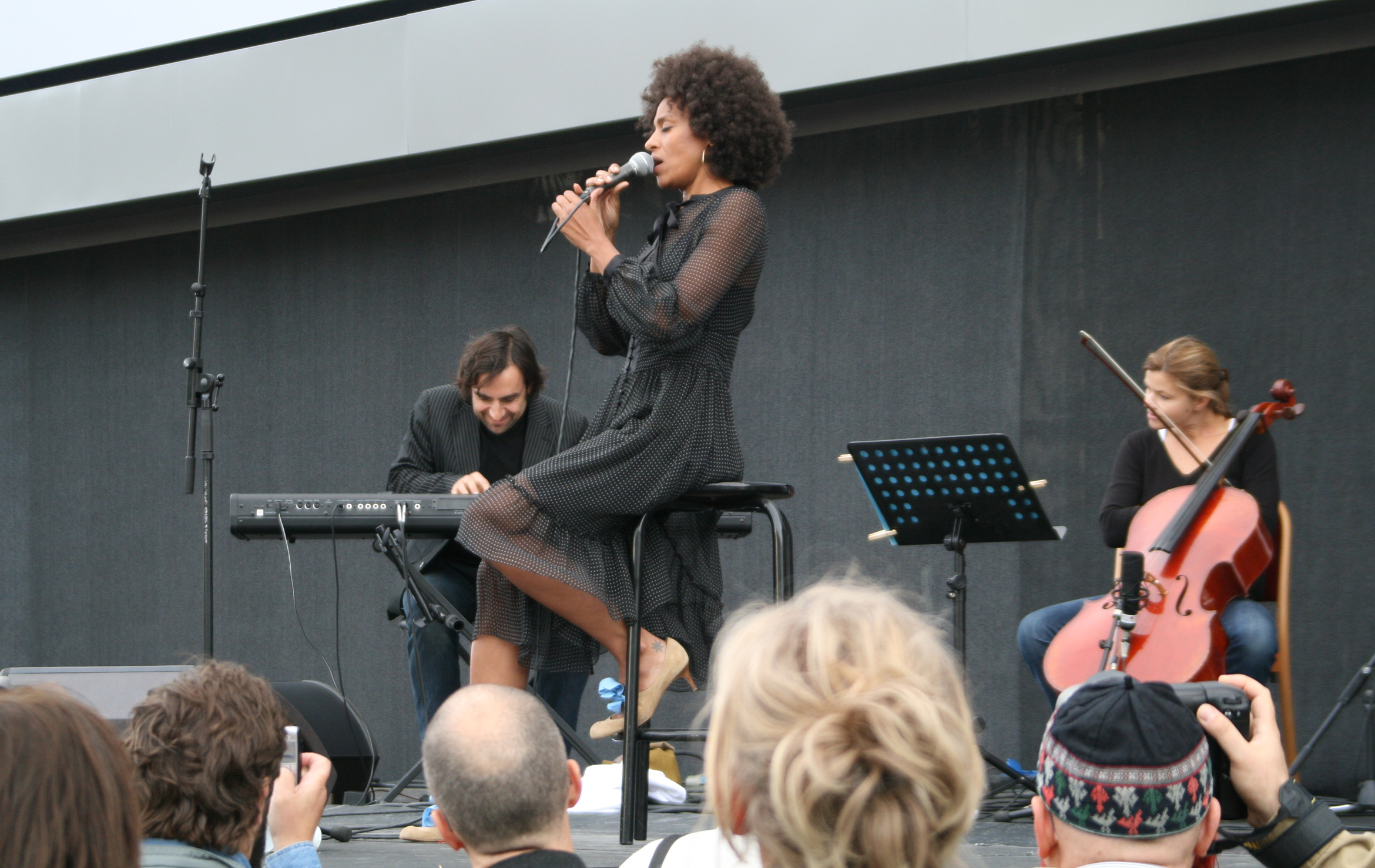
Malia (Rathausplatz, 2007)

Jazz Fest Wien or Vienna Jazz Festival is a jazz festival in Vienna, held annually at the end of June and beginning of July since 1991. An international festival, in 2007 it was attended by some 60,000 spectators. It is now considered one of the world's top jazz festivals.

== Overview ==
The festival is supported by the City of Vienna. Venues include the Museumsquartier, the Stadthalle Wien and the Vienna State Opera as the central venue, among others. Some concerts are freely accessible, such as those at the Town Hall Square. Apart from jazz, soul, blues, rock and pop musicians and a diversity of world and fusion musicians and many genres of jazz participate, usually about 50 artists annually.

At the very first festival in 1991 were artists such as Jan Garbarek, Oscar Peterson, John Scofield, Pat Metheny, Manhattan Transfer, Dizzy Gillespie, Pharoah Sanders, Archie Shepp, John Zorn, Elvin Jones, Gilberto Gil, Miles Davis, George Benson, Carlos Santana, Charlie Haden, Elvin Jones and Joe Zawinul etc.

The 2006 festival saw the likes of Michiel Borstlap, Madeleine Peyroux, Chick Corea, Richard Galliano, Candy Dulfer, the Neville Brothers, Herbie Hancock, Randy Newman and Airto Moreira performing, and 2007 performers included Juliette Gréco, Dionne Warwick, Al Jarreau and George Benson, Roger Chapman, David Murray, Gato Barbieri, Holly Cole, Sheila Jordan, Archie Shepp, John Scofield, Malia etc. The 2012 festival will host elite jazz musicians such as Herbie Hancock, Keith Jarrett, John Scofield and Mike Stern.
