= 1941 in jazz =

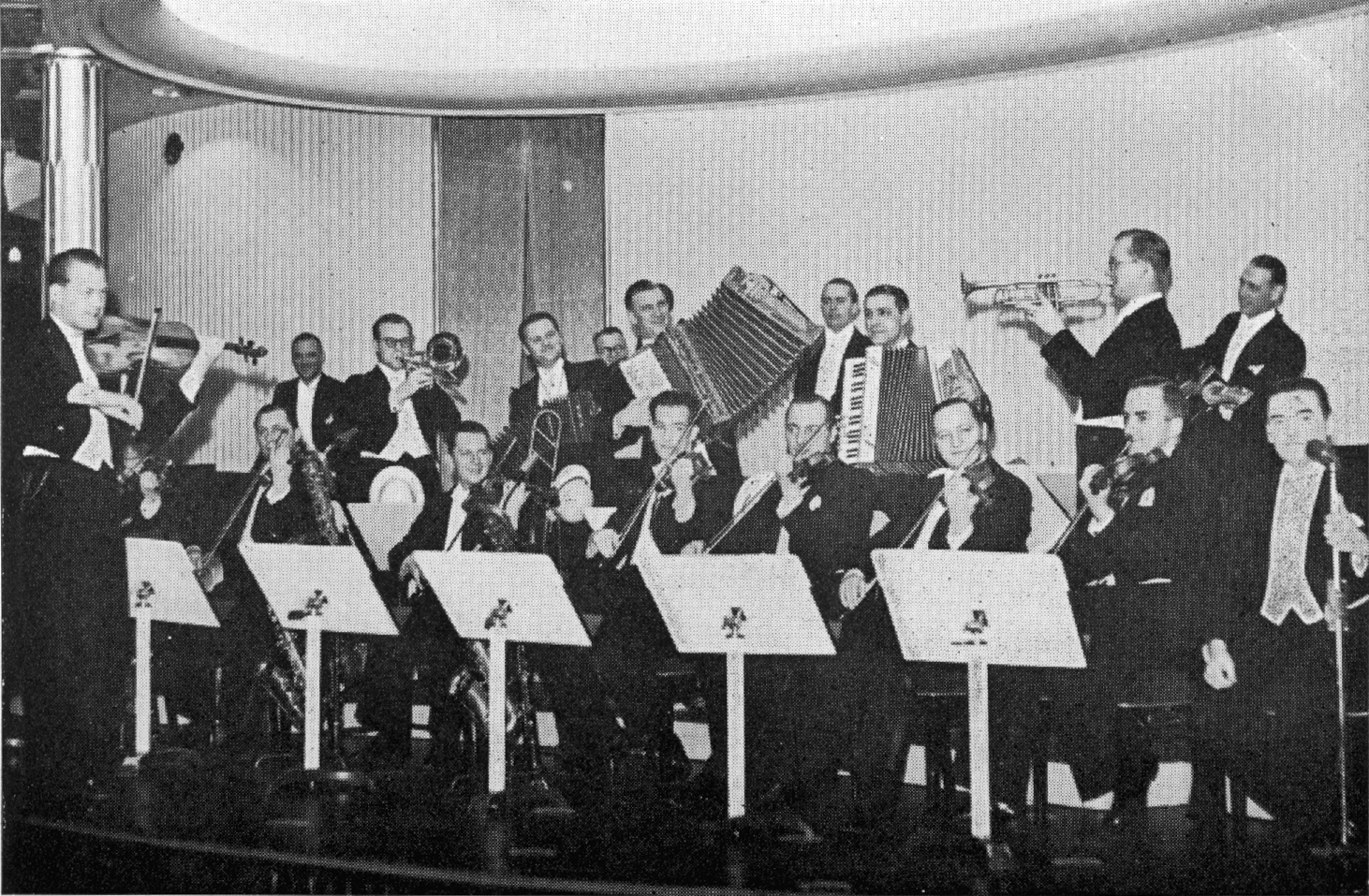
- Danish bandleader Teddy Petersen (1892-1991) with his orchestra
- Decade: 1940s in jazz
- Music: 1941 in music
- Standards: List of 1940s jazz standards
- See also: 1940 in jazz – 1942 in jazz

This is a timeline documenting events of Jazz in the year 1941.

== Events ==
- Cab Calloway is struck by a spitball during a concert in Hartford, Connecticut. He then fights Dizzy Gillespie. Dizzy is consequently fired.

== Deaths ==
February

- 24 – David Plunket Greene, English musician, Bright Young Things (suicide) (born 1904).

March

- 8 – Ken Snakehips Johnson, band leader and dancer, originally from British Guiana (born 1914).
- 9 – Casper Reardon, American harpist (born 1907).

July

- 10 – Jelly Roll Morton, American pianist, bandleader and composer (born 1890).

September

- 1 – Frank Melrose, American pianist (born 1907).

October

- 25 – Nisse Lind, Swedish accordionist and pianist (born 1904).
- 30 – Chu Berry, American tenor saxophonist (born 1908).

November

- 24 – Dick Wilson, American tenor saxophonist (born 1911).

Unknown date

- Steve Lewis, New Orleans pianist and composer (born 1896).

== Births ==
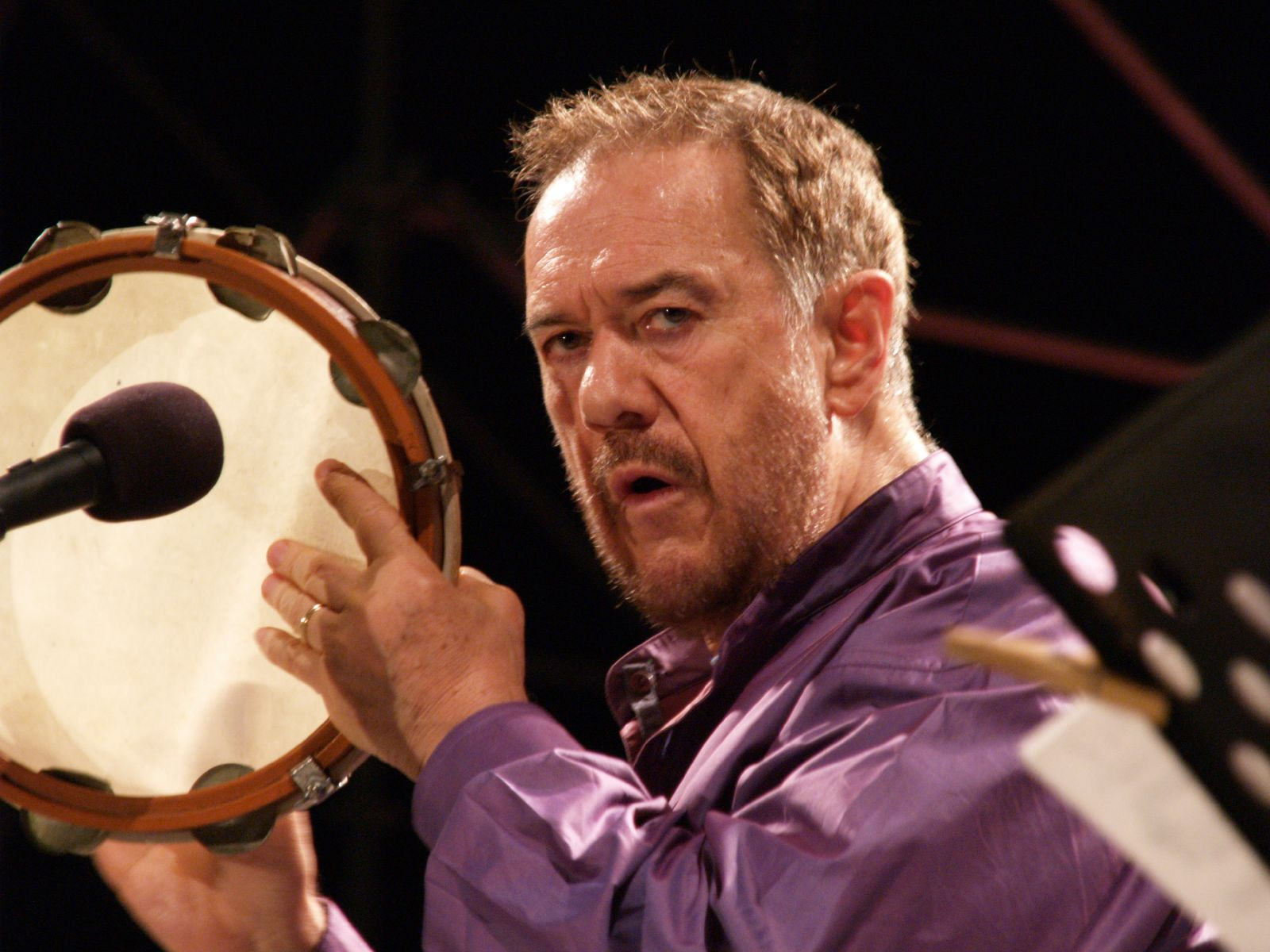
Airto Moreira in 2007

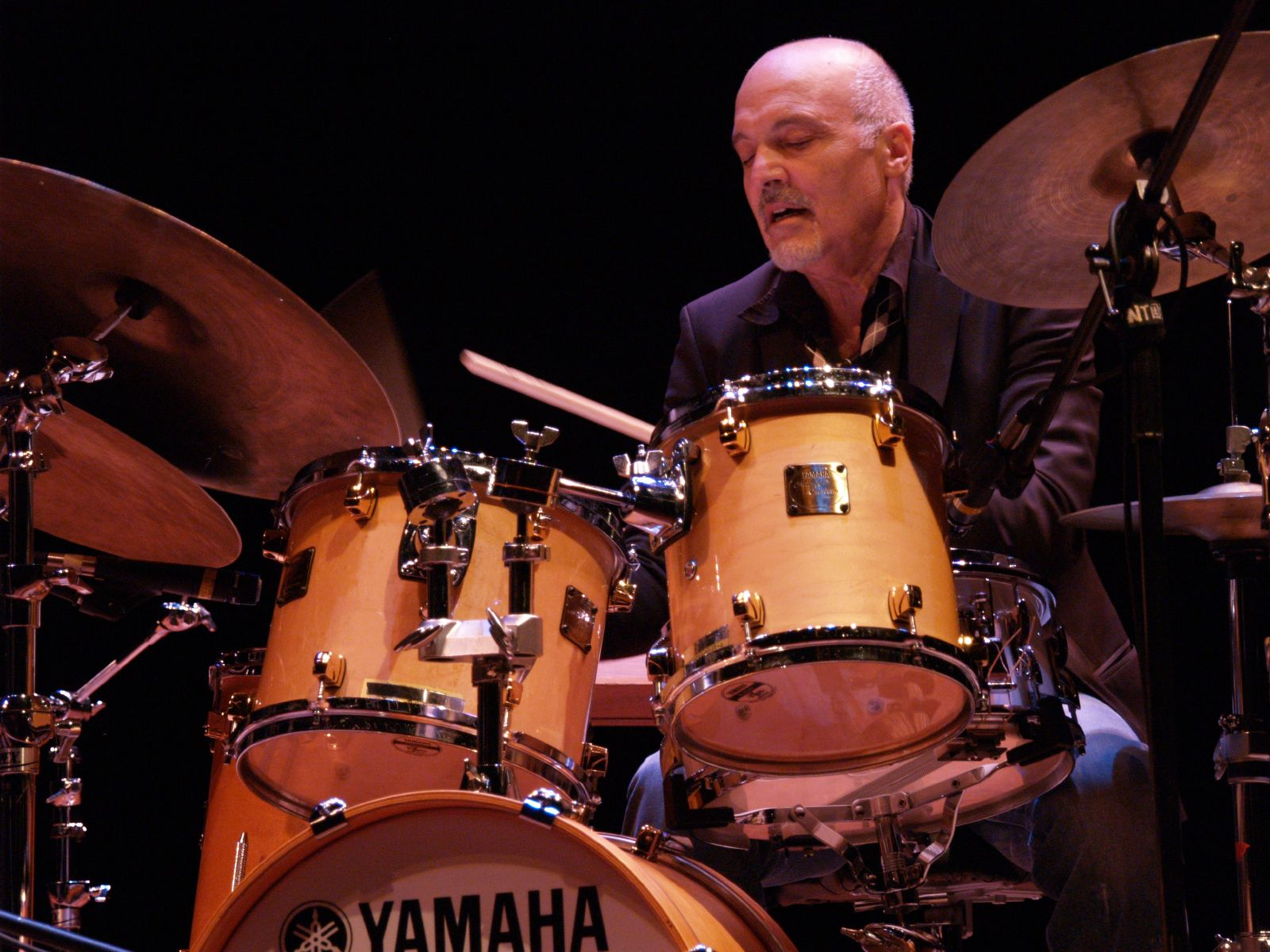
Aldo Romano in 2008

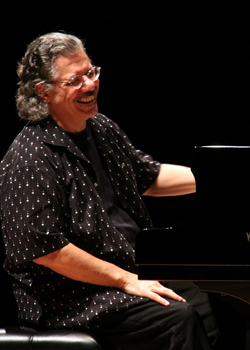
Chick Corea in 2009

January

- 3 – Roger Neumann, American saxophonist, flutist, and composer (died 2018).
- 12 – Olu Dara, American cornetist, guitarist and singer.
- 13 – Frankie Armstrong, English singer and voice teacher, Feminist Improvising Group.
- 15 – Captain Beefheart, American singer (died 2010).
- 16 – Aldo Romano, Italian drummer.
- 19
  - Putter Smith, American bassist.
  - R. Winston Morris, American tubist.
- 27 – Bobby Hutcherson, American vibraphone and marimba player (died 2016).

February

- 5 – Rick Laird, American bassist (died 2021).
- 6 – Palle Mikkelborg, Danish trumpeter.
- 11
  - Louis Banks, Indian keyboardist, singer composer, and record producer.
  - Sérgio Mendes, Brazilian musician.
- 16 – Jim Richardson, British bassist and session musician.
- 17 – Herbie Lewis, American upright bassist (died 2007).
- 18 – Lajos Dudas, German-Hungarian clarinetist and composer.
- 23 – Barry Martyn, English born drummer and bandleader (died 2023).

March

- 4 – Bobby Shew, American trumpet and flugelhorn player.
- 6 – Peter Brötzmann, German saxophonist and clarinetist (died 2023).
- 8 – Franco D'Andrea, Italian pianist and composer.
- 22 – Hugo Rasmussen, Danish upright bassist (died 2015).
- 23 – Carola Standertskjöld, Finnish singer (died 1997).
- 28 – Meredith D'Ambrosio, American singer.

April

- 5 – Michael Moriarty, American-Canadian actor and musician.
- 17 – John C. Marshall, British guitarist, vocalist, and songwriter (died 2012).
- 21
  - Alfred "Pee Wee" Ellis, American saxophonist, composer, and arranger (died 2021).
  - Fredrik Norén, Swedish drummer (died 2016).
- 22 – Don Grusin, American songwriter, producer, and keyboardist.
- 25 – Harry Miller, South African upright bassist (died 1983).
- 28 – Mickey Tucker, American pianist and organist.

May

- 2
  - Connie Crothers, American pianist (died 2016).
  - Eddy Louiss, French Hammon organist and singer (died 2015).
- 5 – Stanley Cowell, American pianist and founder of Strata-East Records (died 2020).
- 7 – Lars Sjösten, Swedish pianist and composer (died 2011).
- 8 – Cornel Chiriac, Romanian journalist, producer, and drummer (died 1975).
- 11 – Eric Burdon, English singer.
- 12 – Trevor Tomkins, English drummer (died 2022).
- 13
  - John Von Ohlen, American drummer, Blue Wisp Big Band (died 2018).
  - Miles Kington, British journalist, musician, and broadcaster (died 2008).
- 20 – Gia Maione, American singer (died 2013).
- 24 – Charles Earland, American composer, organist, and saxophonist (died 1999).
- 27 – Teppo Hauta-aho, Finnish upright bassist and composer (died 2021).

June

- 2
  - Charlie Watts, English drummer, The Rolling Stones (died 2021).
  - Irène Schweizer, Swiss pianist, Feminist Improvising Group.
- 3 – Janusz Muniak, Polish saxophonist, flautist, arranger, and composer (died 2016).
- 12 – Chick Corea, American pianist, keyboardist, and composer (died 2021).
- 18 – Jim Pepper, American saxophonist and singer (died 1992).
- 25 – David T. Walker, American guitarist.
- 26 – Wayne Dockery, American upright bassist (died 2018).

July

- 1 – Robertinho Silva, Brazilian drummer.
- 18 – Pete Yellin, American saxophonist and educator (died 2016).
- 19 – Phil Upchurch, American guitarist and bassist.
- 24 – Bobby Matos, American percussionist (died 2017).
- 28 – Jim Riggs, American saxophonist.

August

- 5
  - Airto Moreira, Brazilian drummer and percussionist.
  - Lenny Breau, American guitarist and music educator (died 1984).
- 6 – Svein Christiansen, Norwegian drummer (died 2015).
- 7 – Howard Johnson, American tubist and saxophonist (died 2021).
- 15 – Eddie Gale, American trumpeter (died 2020).
- 20 – Milford Graves, American drummer and percussionist (died 2021).
- 21 – Tom Coster, American keyboardist and composer.
- 26 – Clifford Jarvis, American drummer (died 1999).
- 27
  - Anders Linder, Swedish actor and musician.
  - Cesária Évora, Cape Verdean singer (died 2011).
- 28 – John Marshall, English drummer, Nucleus.
- 30 – Carmen Fanzone, American horn players.

September

- 8 – Phillip Wilson, American percussionist (died 1992).
- 13 - Knut Kiesewetter, German musician, singer, and songwriter (died 2016).
- 20 – Jim Cullum Jr., American cornetist (died 2019).
- 23 – Norma Winstone, British singer and lyricist.
- 26 – Terry Rosen, American jazz guitarist, concert promoter, and radio DJ. (died 1999).
- 27 – Uli Trepte, German bassist (died 2009).
- 28 – Mike Osborne, English alto saxophonist, pianist, and clarinetist (died 2007).

October

- 1 – LaMont Johnson, American pianist (died 1999).
- 6 – Masahiko Satoh, Japanese pianist, composer, and arranger.
- 9 – Chucho Valdés, Cuban pianist, bandleader, and composer.
- 11 – Lester Bowie, American trumpet player and composer (died 1999).
- 19
  - Eddie Daniels, American clarinetist, saxophonist, and composer.
  - Jonas Gwangwa, South African trombone player (died 2021).
- 28
  - Glen Moore, American bassist.
  - Hank Marvin, English guitarist, multi-instrumentalist, singer, and songwriter.
  - Jay Clayton, American vocalist and jazz educator.

November

- 7 – Gary Windo, American tenor saxophonist (died 1992).
- 22 – Ron McClure, American bassist.
- 25 – Eleni Karaindrou, Greek pianist and composer.
- 28
  - Adelhard Roidinger, Austrian bassist, electronic musician, composer, and computer graphic designer (died 2022).
  - Jesper Thilo, Danish tenor saxophonist, alto saxophonist, and clarinetist.

December

- 2 – P. J. Perry, Canadian saxophonist.
- 19 – Franco Ambrosetti, Swiss trumpeter, flugelhornist and composer.
- 11 – Rogier van Otterloo, Dutch composer and conductor (died 1988).
- 12
  - Gary Barone, American trumpeter and flugelhornist (died 2019).
  - Tim Hauser, American singer (died 2014).
- 18 – Wadada Leo Smith, American trumpeter and composer.
- 19
  - Don Weller, British tenor saxophonist and composer (died 2020).
  - Maurice White, American singer-songwriter, musician, record producer, and bandleader, Earth, Wind & Fire (died 2016).
- 21 – John Hicks, American pianist and composer (died 2006).
- 25
  - Don Pullen, American pianist and organist (died 1995).
  - Ronnie Cuber, American saxophonist (died 2022).
- 29 – Ray Thomas, British flautist and singer, The Moody Blues (died 2018).
- 31 – Elisa Gabbai, German-singing Israeli singer (died 2010).

Unknown date

- Annette Peacock, American composer, singer, songwriter, producer, arranger, and musician.
- Lowell Davidson, American pianist (died 1990).

== See also ==
- 1940s in jazz
- List of years in jazz
- 1941 in music

== Bibliography ==
- The New Real Book, Volume I. Sher Music. 1988. ISBN 0-9614701-4-3.
- The New Real Book, Volume II. Sher Music. 1991. ISBN 0-9614701-7-8.
- The New Real Book, Volume III. Sher Music. 1995. ISBN 1-883217-30-X.
- The Real Book, Volume I (6th ed.). Hal Leonard. 2004. ISBN 0-634-06038-4.
- The Real Book, Volume II (2nd ed.). Hal Leonard. 2007. ISBN 978-1-4234-2452-9.
- The Real Book, Volume III (2nd ed.). Hal Leonard. 2006. ISBN 0-634-06136-4.
- The Real Jazz Book. Warner Bros. ISBN 978-91-85041-36-7.
- The Real Vocal Book, Volume I. Hal Leonard. 2006. ISBN 0-634-06080-5.
