= 1940 in jazz =

- Decade: 1940s in jazz
- Music: 1940 in music
- Standards: List of 1940s jazz standards
- See also: 1939 in jazz – 1941 in jazz

This is a timeline documenting events of Jazz in the year 1940.

== Events ==
March

- The American Society of Composers, Artists and Producers (ASCAP) proposed a new contract, increasing by 100 percent the royalties which they received from broadcast use.

== Top hits of the year ==
On February 8, 1940, “How High the Moon” was introduced during the Broadway revue Two for the Show. The musical would run at the Booth Theatre for 124 performances. Music and Lyrics by Alfred Drake and Frances Comstock.

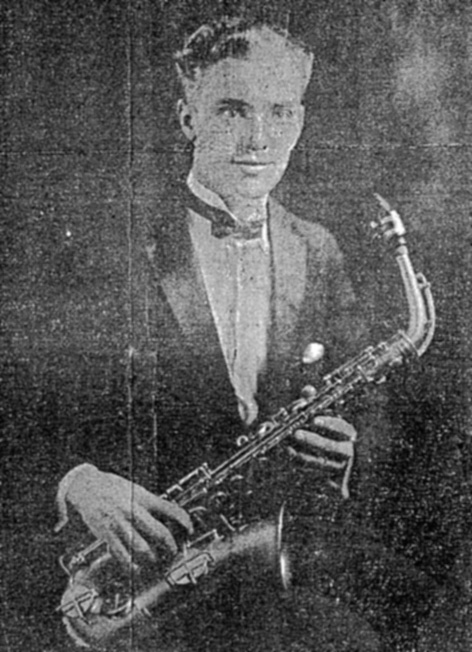
Einar Aaron Swan from newspaper article in Worcester Telegram 1927

== Album releases ==
- Duke Ellington: In a Mellotone
- Duke Ellington: Sophisticated Lady

== Deaths ==
February

- 24 – Guy Kelly, American jazz trumpeter (born 1906).

April

- 23 – Walter Barnes, American jazz clarinetist, saxophonist and bandleader (born 1905).

May

- 1 – Arthur Whetsel, "sweet" trumpeter for Duke Ellington's Washingtonians (born 1905).

August

- 8
  - Einar Aaron Swan, American musician, arranger and composer (born 1903).
  - Johnny Dodds, New Orleans–based jazz clarinetist and alto saxophonist (born 1892).

September

- Charley Straight, American pianist, bandleader and composer (born 1891).

December

- 6 – Charlie Dixon, American jazz banjoist (born 1898).
- 21 – Hal Kemp, jazz alto saxophonist, clarinetist, bandleader, composer, and arranger (born 1904).

== Births ==
January

- 6 – Laudir de Oliveira, Brazilian percussionist in Chicago (died 2017).
- 10 – Waymon Reed, American trumpeter (died 1983).
- 12 – Ronald Shannon Jackson, American drummer (died 2013).
- 18
  - Don Thompson, Canadian double-bassist, pianist, and vibraphonist.
  - Lindsay L. Cooper, Scottish upright bass, electric bass and cello player (died 2001).
- 22 – Eberhard Weber, German double-bassist and composer.
- 30 – Tony Levin, English drummer (died 2011).

February

- 4 – Maurice J. Summerfield, British guitarist, author, publisher, and businessman.
- 10 – Kenny Rankin, American singer and songwriter (died 2009).
- 14 – Bob Kerr, English trumpeter and cornetist, Bonzo Dog Doo-Dah Band.
- 29 – Paul Rutherford, English trombonist (died 2007).

March

- 1
  - Gene Perla, American bassist.
  - Ralph Towner, American guitarist, multi-instrumentalist, and composer.
- 10 – Louis Moholo, South African drummer (died 2025).
- 11 – Bobby Graham, English drummer (died 2009).
- 12 – Al Jarreau, American singer (died 2017).
- 16 – Vagif Mustafazadeh, Azerbaijani pianist and composer (died 1979).
- 19
  - Keith Smith, English trumpeter (died 2008).
  - Roger Dawson, American percussionist.
- 20 – Frode Thingnæs, Norwegian trombonist and orchestra leader (died 2012).
- 22 – Keith Relf, English singer, The Yardbirds (died 1976).
- 24 – S. Frederick Starr, American clarinetist.
- 25 – Lonnie Hillyer, American trumpeter (died 1985).
- 26 – Lew Tabackin, American flutist and tenor saxophonist.
- 29 – Allan Botschinsky, Danish trumpeter, flugelhornist, and composer (died 2020).
- 30 – Astrud Gilberto, Brazilian singer (died 2023).

April

- 2 – Dave MacRae, New Zealand keyboardist.
- 6 – Don Myrick, American saxophonist, The Pharaohs (died 1993).
- 12 – Herbie Hancock, American pianist, keyboardist, bandleader, and composer.
- 13
  - Bjørn Stokstad, Norwegian clarinettist and architect.
  - Neal Creque, American organist and composer (died 2000).
- 16 – Ole Jacob Hansen, Norwegian drummer (died 2000).
- 23 – Pierre Courbois, Dutch drummer, bandleader and composer.
- 28 – Doudou Gouirand, French saxophonist and composer.
- 29 – George Adams, American saxophonist (died 1992).

May

- 1 – Carlos Ward, saxophonist and flautist.
- 9 – Dick Morrissey, British saxophonist and composer (died 2000).
- 15 – Bob Cornford, British jazz pianist and composer (died 1983).
- 17 – Alan Kay, American guitarist and computer scientist.
- 23 – Bjørn Johansen, Norwegian saxophonist (died 2002).
- 25 – Larry Rosen, American drummer, entrepreneur, and music producer (died 2015).
- 28 – Hans Dulfer, Dutch tenor saxophonist.

June

- 2 – Karel Růžička, Czech jazz pianist, composer, and music teacher (died 2016).
- 9 – Curtis Boyd, American drummer.
- 10 – John Stevens, English drummer (died 1994).
- 15 – Nancy King, American singer.
- 17 – Chuck Rainey, American bass guitarist.
- 18 – Sue Raney, American singer.

July

- 5 – Arthur Blythe, American alto saxophonist and composer (died 2017).
- 10 – Brian Priestley, English writer, pianist and arranger.
- 19 – John Roache, American pianist (died 1999).
- 20 – Monica Dominique, Swedish pianist, composer and actress.
- 26 – Casey Jones, American drummer, singer, and record producer (died 2017).

August

- 3
  - Ray Draper, American tuba player (died 1982).
  - Roscoe Mitchell, American saxophonist and composer.
- 6 – Egil Kapstad, Norwegian pianist (died 2017).
- 11 – Peter King, English saxophonist, clarinetist, and composer (died 2020).
- 12 – Thurman Green, American trombonist (died 1997).
- 18 – Adam Makowicz, Polish pianist and composer.
- 27 – Sonny Sharrock, American guitarist (died 1994).
- 29 – Bennie Maupin, American saxophonist, flautist, and bass clarinetist.
- 31 – Wilton Felder, American saxophone and bass player (died 2015).

September

- 2 – Mick Pyne, English pianist (died 1995).
- 3 – James Dapogny, American musicologist, pianist and bandleader (died 2019).
- 10
  - Dave Burrell, American pianist.
  - Roy Ayers, American composer and vibraphone player.
- 12 – John DeFrancesco, American organist and vocalist.
- 13 – Alex Riel, Danish drummer.
- 16
  - Hamiet Bluiett, American saxophonist, clarinetist and composer (died 2018).
  - Lisle Atkinson, American upright bassist (died 2019).
- 21
  - Dick Shearer, American jazz trombonist (died 1997).
  - John Pochee, Australian drummer and bandleader (died 2022).
- 26 – Gary Bartz, American saxophonist and clarinetist.
- 27 – Mike Nock, New Zealand pianist.
- 28
  - Rod Mason, English trumpeter and singer (died 2017).
  - Sirone, American bassist and composer (died 2009).

October

- 1
  - Henry Franklin, American upright bassist.
  - Ramon Carranza, Venezuelan saxophonist and composer (died 2003).
- 4 – Steve Swallow, American bassist and composer.
- 7 – Larry Young, American organist and pianist (died 1978).
- 12 – John Brunious, American trumpeter and bandleader (died 2008).
- 13 – Pharoah Sanders, American saxophonist (died 2022).
- 21 – Manfred Mann, South African–British keyboard player, guitarist, and vocalist, Manfred Mann's Earth Band.
- 23 – Tom McGrath, Scottish pianist and playwright (died 2009).
- 26 – Eddie Henderson, American trumpet and flugelhornist.

November

- 8
  - Kenny Cox, American pianist (died 2008).
  - Terri Quaye, English singer, pianist and percussionist.
- 11 – Mario Pavone, American bassist (died 2021).
- 13 – Janet Lawson, American singer and educator (died 2021).
- 24 – Wendell Logan, American composer (died 2010).
- 28 – Clem Curtis, Trinidadian British singer (died 2017).
- 29
  - Billy Hart, American drummer and educator.
  - Chuck Mangione, American flugelhorn player and composer.

December

- 6 – Jay Leonhart, American upright bassist, singer, and songwriter.
- 14 – Gustavo Bergalli, Argentine trumpeter and bandleader.
- 20 – Larry Willis, American pianist and composer (died 2019).
- 21 – Frank Zappa, American guitarist, record producer (died 1993).
- 22 – Boris Lindqvist, Swedish singer and musician (died 2017).
- 28 – Lonnie Liston Smith, American keyboarder.
- 30 – Jerry Granelli, American-Canadian jazz drummer (died 2021).
- 31 – Mani Neumeier, German drummer.

== See also ==
- 1940s in jazz
- List of years in jazz
- 1940 in music

== Bibliography ==
- The New Real Book, Volume I. Sher Music. 1988. ISBN 0-9614701-4-3.
- The New Real Book, Volume II. Sher Music. 1991. ISBN 0-9614701-7-8.
- The New Real Book, Volume III. Sher Music. 1995. ISBN 1-883217-30-X.
- The Real Book, Volume I (6th ed.). Hal Leonard. 2004. ISBN 0-634-06038-4.
- The Real Book, Volume II (2nd ed.). Hal Leonard. 2007. ISBN 978-1-4234-2452-9.
- The Real Book, Volume III (2nd ed.). Hal Leonard. 2006. ISBN 0-634-06136-4.
- The Real Jazz Book. Warner Bros. ISBN 978-91-85041-36-7.
- The Real Vocal Book, Volume I. Hal Leonard. 2006. ISBN 0-634-06080-5.
