= 2010 in jazz =

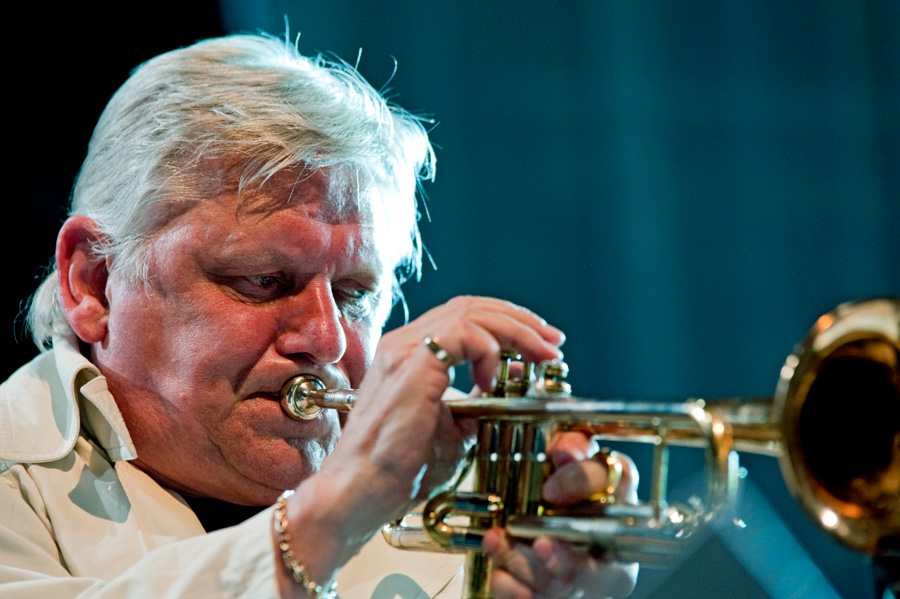
- Palle Mikkelborg, Moers Festival 2010.
- Decade: 2010s in jazz
- Music: 2010 in music
- Standards: List of jazz standards
- See also: 2009 in jazz – 2011 in jazz

This is a timeline documenting events of Jazz in the year 2010.

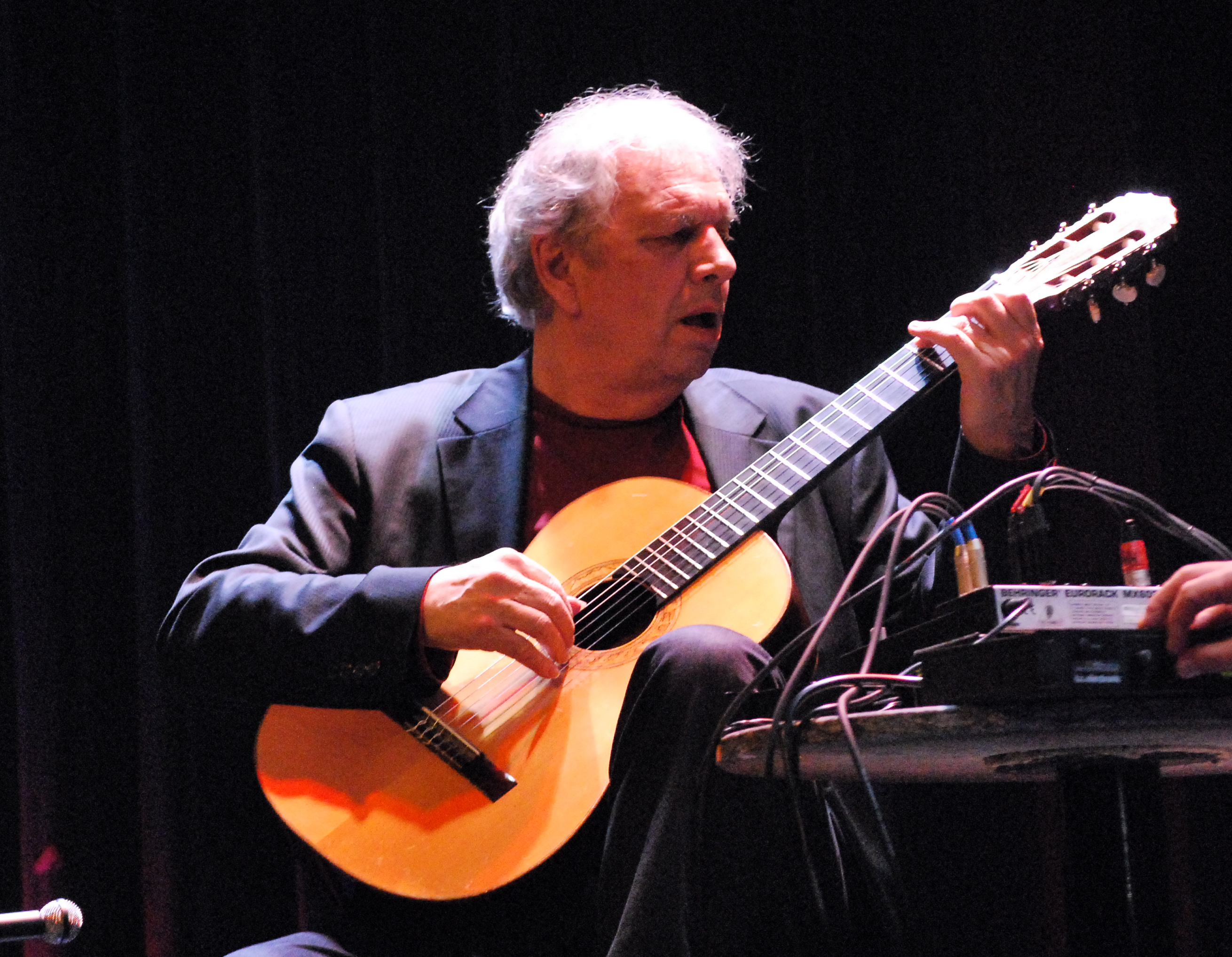
Ralph Towner with Paolo Fresu, Treibhaus Innsbruck 2010.

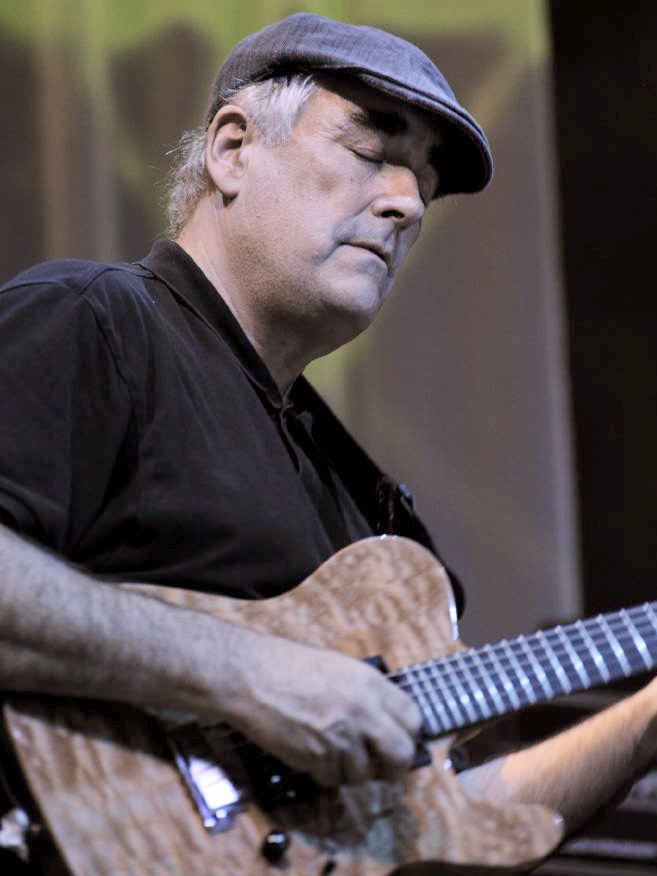
Fred Frith at the 2010 Moers Festival.

== Events ==
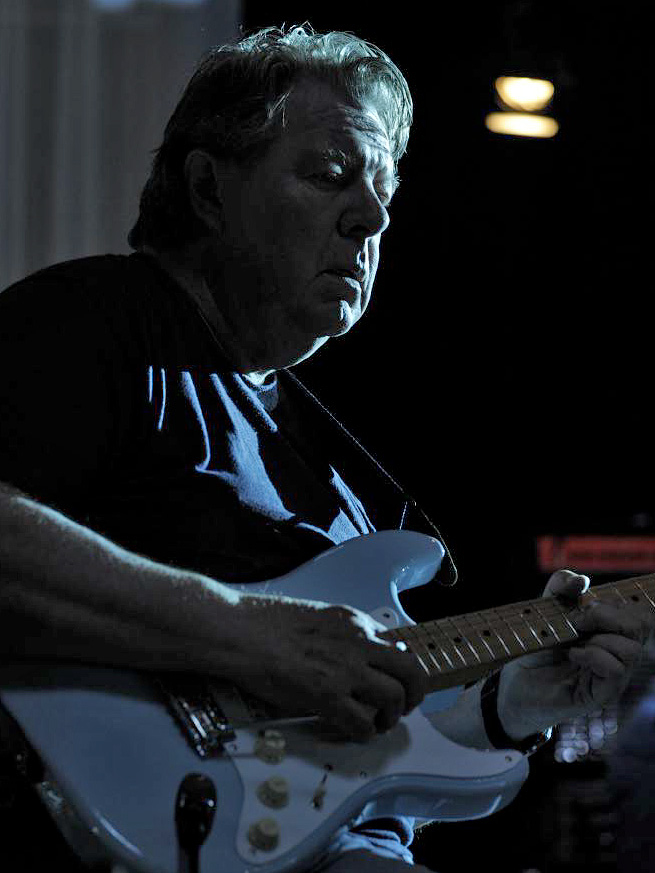
Terje Rypdal, Moers Festival 2010.

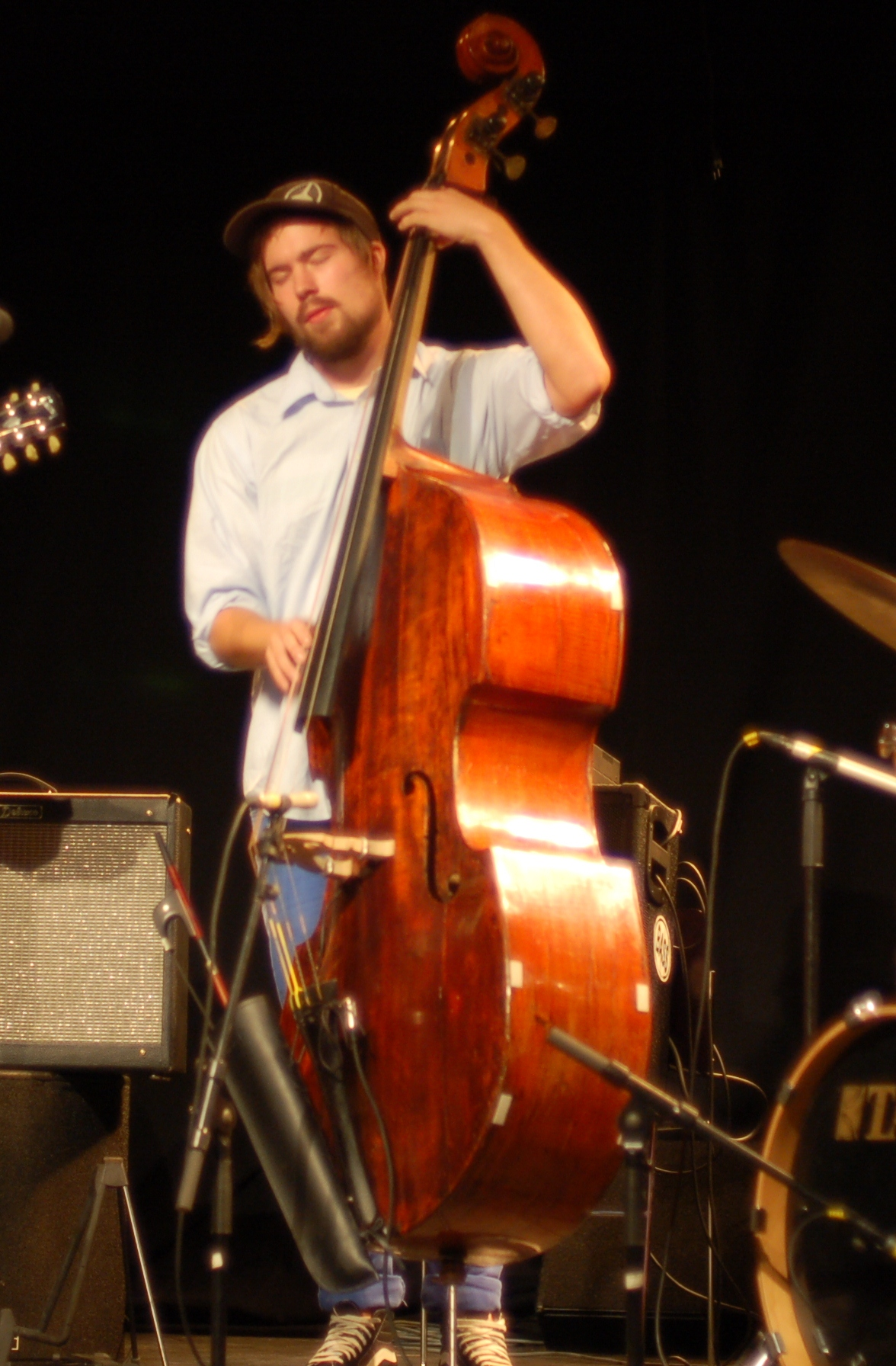
Christian Meaas Svendsen, with Mopti at EnergiMølla, Kongsberg, 2010.

=== January ===
- 29 – The 5th Ice Music Festival started in Geilo, Norway (January 29 – 31).

=== February ===
- 3 – The 13th Polarjazz Festival started in Longyearbyen, Svalbard (February 3–7).

=== March ===
- 5 – The 6th Jakarta International Java Jazz Festival started in Jakarta, Indonesia (March 5–7).
- 26 The 37th Vossajazz started in Voss, Norway (April 26–28).
- 27 Stein Urheim was awarded Vossajazzprisen 2010.
- 27 Karin Krog and John Surman performs the commissioned work Songs about this and that for Vossajazz 2010.

=== April ===
- 28 – The 16th SoddJazz started in Inderøy, Norway (April 28 - May 2).

=== May ===
- 21 – The 39th Moers Festival started in Moers, Germany (May 21 – 24).
- 26 – The 38th Nattjazz started in Bergen, Norway (May 26 - June 7).

=== June ===
- 10 – The 27th Stockholm Jazz Festival started in Stockholm, Sweden (June 10 – 12).
- 25 – The 30th Montreal International Jazz Festival started in Montreal, Quebec, Canada (June 25 - July 6).
- 30 – The 22nd Jazz Fest Wien started in Vienna, Austria (June 30 – July 9).

=== July ===
- 2
  - The 32nd Copenhagen Jazz Festival started in Copenhagen, Denmark (July 2 – 11).
  - The 44th Montreux Jazz Festival started in Montreux, Switzerland (July 2 – 17).
- 7 – The 46th Kongsberg Jazzfestival started in Kongsberg, Norway (July 7 – 11).
- 9 – The 35th North Sea Jazz Festival started in The Hague, Netherlands (July 9 – 11).
- 16 – The 45th Pori Jazz Festival started in Pori, Finland (July 16 – 25).
- 17 – The 63rd Nice Jazz Festival started in Nice, France (July 17 – 24).
- 19 – The 50th Moldejazz started in Molde, Norway (July 19–24).
- 20 – The 45th San Sebastian Jazz Festival started in San Sebastian, Spain (July 20 – 25).

=== August ===
- 6
  - The 54th Newport Jazz Festival started in Newport, Rhode Island (August 6 – 8).
  - The 26th Brecon Jazz Festival started in Brecon, Wales (August 6 – 8).
- 11 – The 24th Sildajazz starts in Haugesund, Norway (August 11–15).
- 16 – The 25th Oslo Jazzfestival started in Oslo, Norway (August 16 – 22).

=== September ===
- 2 – The 6th Punktfestivalen started in Kristiansand, Norway (September 2 – 4).
- 17 – The 53rd Monterey Jazz Festival started in Monterey, California (September 17 – 19).

=== November ===
- 12 – The 19th London Jazz Festival started in London, England (November 12 – 21).

== Album released ==
=== January ===
Day	Album	Artist	Label	Notes	Ref.
11	I.S.	Tore Johansen feat. Steve Swallow	Inner Ear		
18	Heavy Metal Fruit	Motorpsycho	Stickman Records, Rune Grammofon		
26	Orchestrion	Pat Metheny	Nonesuch Records		
29	Private Corner	Jacky Cheung	Universal Music		

=== March ===
Day	Album	Artist	Label	Notes	Ref.
1	Clown Core	Clown Core	N/A	Unknown Producer	
18	Emotion & Commotion	Jeff Beck	ATCO	Produced by Steve Lipson, Trevor Horn	

=== April ===
Day	Album	Artist	Label	Notes	Ref.
16	Crime Scene	Terje Rypdal	ECM Records	Produced by Manfred Eicher	
19	Live Extracts	Eivind Aarset's Sonic Codex Orchestra	ECM Records	Produced by Manfred Eicher	
20	To the One	John McLaughlin	Abstract Logix	Produced by John McLaughlin	

=== May ===
Day	Album	Artist	Label	Notes	Ref.
18	Plan	Oliver Lake Organ Quartet	Passin' Thru		

=== June ===
Day	Album	Artist	Label	Notes	Ref.
15	The Stanley Clarke Band	The Stanley Clarke Band	Heads Up	Produced by Lenny White, Stanley Clarke	
22	The Imagine Project	Herbie Hancock	Hancock Music	Produced by John Alagia, Derek Trucks	

=== July ===
Day	Album	Artist	Label	Notes	Ref.
10	Celebrating Mary Lou Williams–Live at Birdland New York	Trio 3 (Oliver Lake, Reggie Workman & Andrew Cyrille) + Geri Allen	Intakt Records	Produced by Patrik Landolt	

=== September ===
Day	Album	Artist	Label	Notes	Ref.
20	Officium Novum	Jan Garbarek and The Hilliard Ensemble	ECM Records	Produced by Manfred Eicher	

=== October ===
Day	Album	Artist	Label	Notes	Ref.
19	Norwegian Song 3	Dag Arnesen Trio	Losen Records		
26	Live and Exclusive from the Grammy Museum	Jeff Beck	ATCO	Produced by David May	

=== November ===
Day	Album	Artist	Label	Notes	Ref.
1	Synlige Hjerteslag	Frida Ånnevik	Grappa Music		

=== December ===
Day	Album	Artist	Label	Notes	Ref.
1	License To Chill	Haakon Graf with Per Mathisen and Erik Smith	Nordic Records		

=== Unknown date ===
#

A

- Atomic – Theater Tilters Vol 1.
- Atomic – Theater Tilters Vol 2.

E

- Eple Trio – In The Clearing / In The Cavern.

H

- Daniel Herskedal – City Stories.

V

- Very Much Alive by Paolo Vinaccia featuring Terje Rypdal, Ståle Storløkken and Palle Mikkelborg.

== Deaths ==
January

- 3 – Joyce Collins, American pianist, singer, and educator (born 1930).
- 10 – Dick Johnson, American big band clarinetist (born 1925).
- 11 – Georgy Garanian, Armenian-Russian saxophonist, bandleader, and composer (born 1934).
- 13 – Ed Thigpen, American drummer, Oscar Peterson Trio (born 1930).
- 16 – Jimmy Wyble, American guitarist (born 1922).
- 17 – Maki Asakawa, Japanese jazz and blues singer, lyricist and composer (born 1942).
- 19 – Ian Christie, English clarinettist (born 1927).
- 23 – Earl Wild, American pianist (born 1915).
- 25 – Jane Jarvis, American pianist (born 1915).

February

- 6
  - John Dankworth, English saxophonist, clarinettist and composer (born 1927).
  - Roger Guérin, French trumpeter and singer (born 1926).
- 12 – Jake Hanna, American jazz drummer (born 1931).
- 13 – Jamil Nasser, American bassist, and tubist (born 1932).
- 15 – Art Van Damme, American accordionist (born 1920).

March

- 7 – Tony Campise, American saxophonist (born 1943).
- 15 – Sam Mtukudzi, Zimbabwean saxophonist and guitarist (born 1988).
- 20 – Erwin Lehn, German composer, bandleader, and musician (born 1919).
- 22 – Diz Disley, Anglo-Canadian guitarist (born 1931).
- 23 – Marva Wright, American blues singer (born 1948).
- 27 – Peter Herbolzheimer, German trombonist and bandleader (born 1935).
- 28 – Herb Ellis, American guitarist (born 1921).
- 29 – Luigi Trussardi, French upright bassist (born 1938).
- 30 – John Bunch, American pianist (born 1921).

April

- 2 – Mike Zwerin, American musician and author (born 1930).
- 7
  - Eddie Johnson, American tenor saxophonist (born 1920).
  - Graciela, Afro-Cuban singer (born 1915).
- 11 – Julia Tsenova, Bulgarian composer, pianist, and musical pedagogue (born 1948).
- 13 – Steve Reid, American drummer (born 1944).

May

- 1
  - Jesse Drakes, American trumpeter (born 1924).
  - Rob McConnell, Canadian jazz trombonist, composer, and arranger (born 1935).
- 7 – Francisco Aguabella, Afro-Cuban percussionist (born 1925).
- 9 – Lena Horne, American singer (born 1917).
- 16 – Hank Jones, American pianist, bandleader, arranger, and composer (born 1918).
- 30 – Kristian Bergheim, Norwegian saxophonist (born 1926).

June

- 5 – Danny Bank, American saxophonist, clarinetist, and flautist (born 1922).
- 9
  - Harold Ivory Williams Jr., American keyboardist (born 1949).
  - Paul Moer, American pianist (born 1916).
- 15 – Wendell Logan, American composer (born 1940).
- 16 – Bill Dixon, American trumpeter, flugelhornist, pianist, composer, and visual artist (born 1925).
- 24 – Fred Anderson, American tenor saxophonist (born 1929).
- 26 – Benny Powell, African-American jazz trombonist (born 1930).
- 28 – Joya Sherrill, American singer and children's television show host (born 1924).

July

- 8
  - Lelio Luttazzi, Italian composer, musician, actor, singer, and conductor (born 1923).
  - Valdo Williams, Canadian pianist (born 1928).
- 14 – Gene Ludwig, American organist (born 1937).
- 22
  - Dick Buckley, American radio presenter (born 1924).
  - Harry Beckett, British trumpeter and flugelhornist (born 1935).
- 23 – Willem Breuker, Dutch bandleader, composer, arranger, saxophonist, and clarinetist (born 1944).
- 29 – Martin Drew, English drummer (born 1944).

August

- 8 – Jack Parnell, English producer, bandleader, drummer, and pianist (born 1923).
- 11 – Leon Breeden, clarinetist, American saxophonist, composer, and arranger (born 1921).
- 14 – Abbey Lincoln, American singer (born 1930).
- 15 – Ahmad Alaadeen, American saxophonist (born 1934).
- 19 – Dick Maloney, Canadian singer and radio host (born 1933).

September

- 8 – Hadley Caliman, American saxophonist and flautist (born 1932).
- 11 – Gunnar Hoffsten, Swedish composer, bandleader, trumpeter, and pianist (born 1923).
- 14 – Alf Kjellman, Norwegian saxophonist (born 1938).
- 19 – Buddy Collette, American flautist, saxophonist, and clarinetist (born 1921).
- 27
  - Buddy Morrow, American trombonist and bandleader (born 1919).
  - Ed Wiley Jr., American tenor saxophonist (born 1930).

October

- 7 – T Lavitz, American keyboardist, composer and producer (born 1956).
- 17 – Dennis Taylor, American saxophonist, clarinet, and arranger (born 1953).
- 18 – Marion Brown, American jazz alto saxophonist and ethnomusicologist (born 1939).
- 28
  - Jack Brokensha, Australian-American vibraphonist (born 1926).
  - Walter Payton, American bassist and sousaphonist (born 1942).

November

- 16 – Mimi Perrin, French pianist and singer, and translator (born 1926).
- 30 – Monty Sunshine, English clarinettist (born 1928).

December

- 9 – James Moody, American saxophonist (cancer) (born 1925).
- 14 – Elisa Gabbai, Israeli singer (born 1933).
- 17
  - Captain Beefheart, American singer (born 1941).
  - Lina Romay, Mexican-American actress and singer (born 1919).
- 19 – Trudy Pitts, American soul jazz keyboardist (born 1932).
- 28 – Billy Taylor, American pianist (born 1921).

== See also ==
- List of 2010 albums
- List of years in jazz
- 2010s in jazz
- 2010 in music
