= 1938 in jazz =

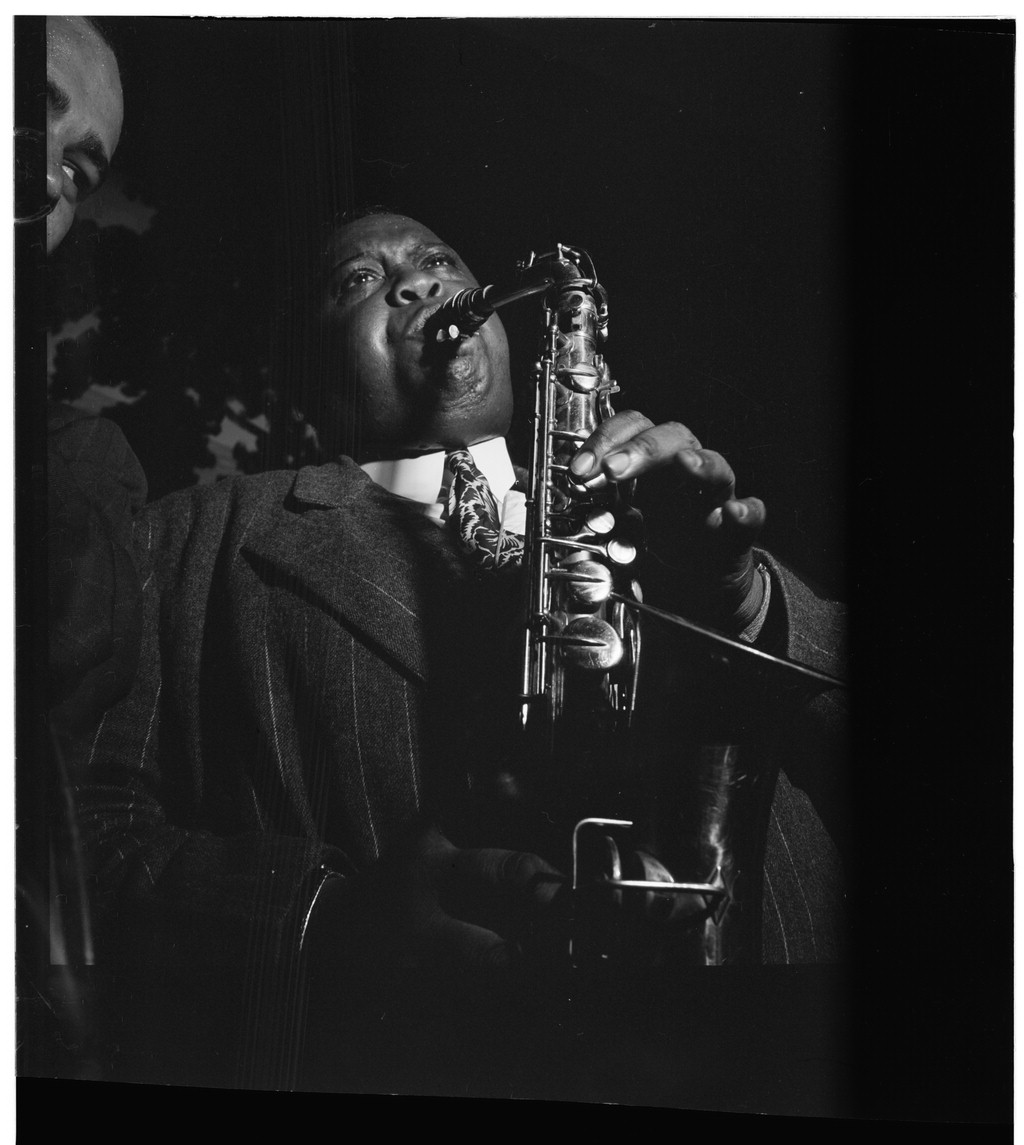
- Pete Brown, between 1938 and 1948 by William P. Gottlieb
- Decade: 1930s in jazz
- Music: 1938 in music
- Standards: List of 1930s jazz standards
- See also: 1937 in jazz – 1939 in jazz

This is a timeline documenting events of Jazz in the year 1938.

== Events ==
- Benny Goodman performs The Famous 1938 Carnegie Hall Jazz Concert.

== Deaths ==
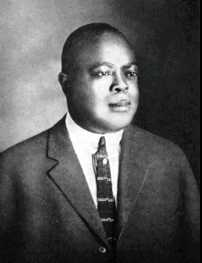
Joe "King" Oliver c. 1915

May

- 25 – Dick McDonough, American guitarist and composer (born 1904).

April

- 10 – Joe "King" Oliver, American cornet player and bandleader (born 1885).

August

- 16 – Robert Johnson, American guitarist, singer, and composer (born 1911).

Unknown date

- Garnet Clark, American pianist (born 1917).

== Births ==
January

- 13 – Daevid Allen, Australian poet, guitarist, singer, and composer, Soft Machine and Gong (died 2015).
- 17 – Alf Kjellman, Norwegian saxophonist (died 2010).
- 24 – Julius Hemphill, American composer and saxophonist (died 1995).
- 25
  - Etta James, American singer (died 2012).
- 27 – Jimmie Smith, American drummer.

February

- 1 – Jimmy Carl Black, American drummer and singer of The Mothers of Invention (died 2008).
- 11 – Slim Richey, American jazz guitarist (died 2015).
- 17 – John Coates Jr., American pianist (died 2017).
- 23 – Wilson Simonal, Brazilian singer (died 2000).
- 24 – Louie Ramirez, American percussionist and vibraphonist (died 1993).
- 28 – Mike Wofford, American pianist.

March

- 7 – Petr Skoumal, Czech pianist and composer (died 2014).
- 9
  - Lill-Babs or Barbro Svensson, Swedish singer and actress (died 2018).
  - Marzette Watts, American saxophonist (died 1998).
  - Roy Brooks, American drummer (died 2005).
- 15 – Charles Lloyd, American tenor saxophonist and flautist.
- 23 – Dave Pike, American vibraphone and marimba player (died 2015).
- 24 – Steve Kuhn, American pianist and composer.
- 29 – Laco Déczi, Slovak-American trumpeter and composer.

April

- 2
  - Booker Little, American trumpeter and composer (died 1961).
  - Sal Nistico, American tenor saxophonist (died 1991).
- 7
  - Alexander von Schlippenbach, German pianist and composer.
  - Freddie Hubbard, American trumpeter (died 2008).
  - Pete La Roca, American drummer (died 2012).
- 10 – Denny Zeitlin, American pianist and composer.
- 13 – Eddie Marshall, American drummer (died 2011).
- 14 – Monty Waters, American saxophonist, flautist, and singer (died 2008).
- 18
  - Bob Parlocha, American jazz expert and radio host (died 2015).
  - Hal Galper, American pianist and composer.
- 27 – Ruth Price, American singer.

May

- 2 – Fred Braceful, American-German drummer (died 1995).
- 12 – Jimmy Hastings, British saxophonist, Canterbury scene.
- 13 – Ross Tompkins, American pianist (died 2006).
- 23 – Daniel Humair, Swiss drummer and composer.
- 26 – Jaki Liebezeit, German drummer (died 2017).

June

- 6 – Luigi Trussardi, French upright bassist (died 2010).
- 9 – Eje Thelin, Swedist trombonist (died 1990).
- 11 – Stu Martin, American drummer (died 1980).
- 15 – Tony Oxley, English drummer.
- 18 – Don "Sugarcane" Harris, American violinist (died 1999).
- 20 – Dennis Budimir, American guitarist (died 2023).

July

- 1 – Robert Schulz, American cornetist.
- 3 – Rhoda Scott, African-American organist.
- 4 – Mike Mainieri, American vibraphonist.
- 10
  - Arnie Lawrence, American saxophonist (died 2005).
  - Lee Morgan, American trumpeter (died 1972).
- 14 – Tommy Vig, Portuguese vibraharpist, drummer, percussionist, big band leader, and composer.
- 18
  - Buschi Niebergall, German musician (died 1990).
  - Dudu Pukwana, South African saxophonist (died 1990).
- 26 – Joanne Brackeen, American pianist.
- 31 – Gap Mangione, American pianist, composer, arranger, and bandleader.

August

- 13 – Michael Joseph Smith, American composer and pianist.
- 14 – Don Moore, American upright bassist (died 2025).
- 15 – Stix Hooper, American drummer.

September

- 7 – Jon Mayer, American pianist and composer.
- 17 – Perry Robinson, American clarinetist and composer (died 2018).
- 20 – Eric Gale, American guitarist (died 1994).
- 28
  - Gerd Dudek, German saxophonist, clarinetist and flautist (died 2022).
  - Ray Warleigh, Australian-born saxophonist and flautist (died 2015).

October

- 2
  - Kjell Bartholdsen, Norwegian saxophonist (died 2009).
  - Gugge Hedrenius, Swedish pianist and bandleader (died 2009).
- 4 – Mark Levine, American jazz pianist, trombonist, and composer (died 2022).
- 15 – Fela Kuti, Nigerian multi-instrumentalist, saxophonist, and composer (died 1997).
- 22 – Harrison Ridley Jr., American jazz presenter (died 2009).
- 24 – Odean Pope, American tenor saxophonist.
- 26 – John "Jabo" Starks, American drummer (died 2018).

November

- 12 – Warren Bernhardt, American pianist (died 2022).

December

- 9 – William Thomas McKinley, American composer and pianist (died 2015).
- 11 – McCoy Tyner, American pianist (died 2020).
- 19 – Pete Strange, English trombonist (died 2004).
- 28
  - Charles Neville, American R&B saxophonist, The Neville Brothers (died 2018).
  - Dick Sudhalter, American trumpeter and criti (died 2008).

Unknown date

- Barry Buckley, Australian upright bassist (died 2006).
- Pat LaCroix, Canadian musician and photographer.
