= 1904 in jazz =

- Decade: Pre-1920 in jazz
- Music: 1904 in music
- Standards: List of pre-1920 jazz standards
- See also: 1903 in jazz – 1905 in jazz

This is a timeline documenting events of Jazz in the year 1904.

== Events ==
- Jelly Roll Morton started touring in the Southern United States, working in minstrel shows, including Will Benbow's Chocolate Drops.

== Births ==
January

- 21 – Juice Wilson, American violinist (died 1993).

February

- 1 – Tricky Sam Nanton, American trombonist (died 1946).
- 12 – Donald Lambert, American stride pianist (died 1962).
- 23 – Cie Frazier, American drummer (died 1985).
- 29 – Jimmy Dorsey, American clarinetist, saxophonist, composer and big band leader (died 1957).

March

- 1 – Glenn Miller, American trombonist, arranger, composer, and bandleader (died 1944).
- 12 – Freddy Johnson, American pianist and singer (died 1961).
- 25 – Pete Johnson, American pianist (died 1967).
- 27 – Hal Kemp, American alto saxophonist, clarinetist, bandleader, composer, and arranger (died 1940).

April

- 4
  - Arne Hülphers, Swedish pianist and bandleader (died 1978).
  - Peter van Steeden, Dutchc-American composer (died 1990).
- 9 – Sharkey Bonano, American trumpeter, band leader, and vocalist (died 1972).
- 21 – Leo Adde, American jazz drummer (died 1942).
- 29 – Russ Morgan, American big band leader and musical arranger (died 1969).

May

- 21 – Fats Waller, American jazz pianist, organist, composer, singer, and comedic entertainer (died 1943).
- 26 – George Formby, English actor, singer-songwriter, and comedian (died 1961).
- 31
  - Otto Hardwick, American saxophonist (died 1970).
  - Stan Brenders, Belgian pianist and bandleader (died 1969).

June

- 2 – Valaida Snow, African-American trumpeter and entertainer (died 1956).
- 6 – Raymond Burke, American clarinetist (died 1986).
- 7 – Don Murray, American clarinetist and saxophonist (died 1929).
- 11 – Pinetop Smith, American pianist (died 1929).
- 24 – Phil Harris, American comedian, actor, and singer (died 1995).

July

- 30 – Dick McDonough, American guitarist and banjoist (died 1938).

August

- 4 – Bill Coleman, American trumpeter (died 1981).
- 8 – Peter Packay, Belgian trumpeter, arranger, and composer (died 1965).
- 10 – Geraldo, English bandleader and composer (died 1974).
- 11 – Jess Stacy, American pianist (died 1995).
- 13 – Charles Rogers, American film actor and musician (died 1999).
- 21 – Count Basie, American pianist, organist, bandleader, and composer (died 1984).
- 24 – Buster Smith, American alto saxophonist (died 1991).
- 30 – Floyd Bean, American jazz pianist (died 1974).

October

- 4 – Greely Walton, American tenor saxophonist (died 1993).
- 18 – Stump Evans, American saxophonist (died 1928).
- 27 – Nisse Lind, Swedish accordionist and pianist (died 1941).

November

- 14 – Art Hodes, Ukrainian-American pianist (died 1993).
- 19 – David Plunket Greene, English musician, Bright Young Things (suicide) (died 1941).
- 21 – Coleman Hawkins, American tenor saxophonist (died 1969).
- 27 – Eddie South, American jazz violinist (died 1962).

December

- 4 – Herman Autrey, American trumpeter (died 1980).

Unknown date

- Arthur Rosebery, English pianist and singer (died 1986).
