= 1999 in jazz =

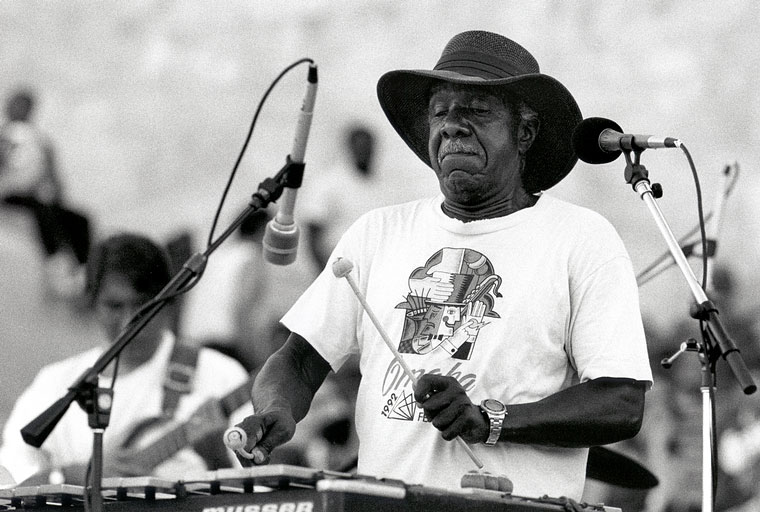
- Luigi Waites plays the vibraphone during a tribute to Duke Ellington, July 29, 1999
- Decade: 1990s in jazz
- Music: 1999 in music
- Standards: List of post-1950 jazz standards
- See also: 1998 in jazz – 2000 in jazz

This is a timeline documenting events of Jazz in the year 1999.

== Events ==
=== March ===
- 26 – The 26th Vossajazz started in Vossavangen, Norway (March 26 – 28).

=== May ===
- 13 – The 27th Nattjazz started in Bergen, Norway (May 13 – 29).
- 21 – The 28th Moers Festival started in Moers, Germany (May 21 – 24).

=== June ===
- 30 – The 35th Kongsberg Jazzfestival started in Kongsberg, Norway (June 30 – July 3).

=== July ===
- 1 – The 20th Montreal International Jazz Festival started in Montreal, Quebec, Canada (July 1 – 11).
- 2 – The 9th Jazz Fest Wien started in Wien, Austria (July 2 – 10).
- 3 – The 33rd Montreux Jazz Festival started in Montreux, Switzerland (July 3 – 18).
- 10
  - The 24th North Sea Jazz Festival started in The Hague (July 10 – 12).
  - The 34th Pori Jazz started in Pori, Finland (July 10 – 19).
- 11 – The 52nd Nice Jazz Festival started in Nice, France (July 11 – 18).
- 12 – The 39th Moldejazz started in Molde, Norway (July 12 – 17).
- 21 – The 34th San Sebastian Jazz Festival started in San Sebastian, Spain (July 22 – 27).

=== August ===
- 9 – The 14th Oslo Jazzfestival started in Oslo, Norway (August 9 – 15).
- 11 – The 13th Sildajazz started in Haugesund, Norway (August 11 – 15).
- 13 – The 16th Brecon Jazz Festival started in Brecon, Wales (August 13 – 15).

=== September ===
- 17 – The 42nd Monterey Jazz Festival started in Monterey, California (September 17 – 19).

=== Unknown date ===
- "Don't Know Why" by Jesse Harris appears on his 1999 album, Jesse Harris & the Ferdinandos.
- The Magic City Jazz Orchestra (MCJO) American jazz ensemble is founded.
- The Pulitzer Prize Board bestows a special posthumous honor on Duke Ellington.
- WEAA is named 1999 Jazz Station of the Year by Gavin magazine.
- Atomic, Norwegian / Swedish jazz band formed.
- Radioactive Sago Project, a Filipino jazz rock band formed in Quezon City, Metro Manila, Philippines.
- III Records, a record label based in Japan is founded.
- Zoe Rahman, British jazz composer and pianist, won the "Perrier Young Jazz Musician of the Year" Award.

== Album releases ==
=== July ===
Day	Album	Artist	Label	Notes	Ref.
27	The Art of the Song	Charlie Haden	Polygram Records	Produced by Charlie Haden, Ruth Cameron	

=== With Wikipedia articles ===
- 1999 Remixes, the third compilation album released by British acid jazz band Jamiroquai
- April Kisses, by Bucky Pizzarelli
- Contemporary Jazz, by the Branford Marsalis Quartet
- Continuance, by jazz fusion band Greetings From Mercury, recorded live at Vooruit, Ghent, Belgium
- Live at the Floating Jazz Festival, from the 1997 jazz festival of the same name by violinist Johnny Frigo and his quartet.
- Peculiar Situation, a smooth jazz studio album by Earl Klugh
- Synergy, studio album by jazz-fusion group Dave Weckl Band
- Time's Mirror, big band album by jazz trumpeter, composer and arranger, Tom Harrell
- Without Kuryokhin, American jazz multi-instrumentalist Kenny Millions and Japanese experimental musician Otomo Yoshihide.
- Barefoot on the Beach, by American smooth jazz vocalist Michael Franks.

=== Other ===
- Jane Ira Bloom: The Red Quartets
- Steve Coleman: The Sonic Language of Myth – Believing Learning Knowing
- Marty Ehrlich: Malinke's Dance
- Bill Dixon: Papyrus I
- Guillermo Gregorio: Red Cubed
- Paul Dunmall: Bebop Starburst
- Matthew Shipp: Expansion, Power, Release
- Misha Mengelberg: Solo
- Marilyn Crispell: ⋅Red
- Marilyn Crispell: Blue
- Evan Parker: After Appleby
- Joshua Redman: Beyond
- Maybe Monday: Saturn's Finger
- Richard Lee Johnson: Fingertip Ship (Metro Blue)

== Deaths ==
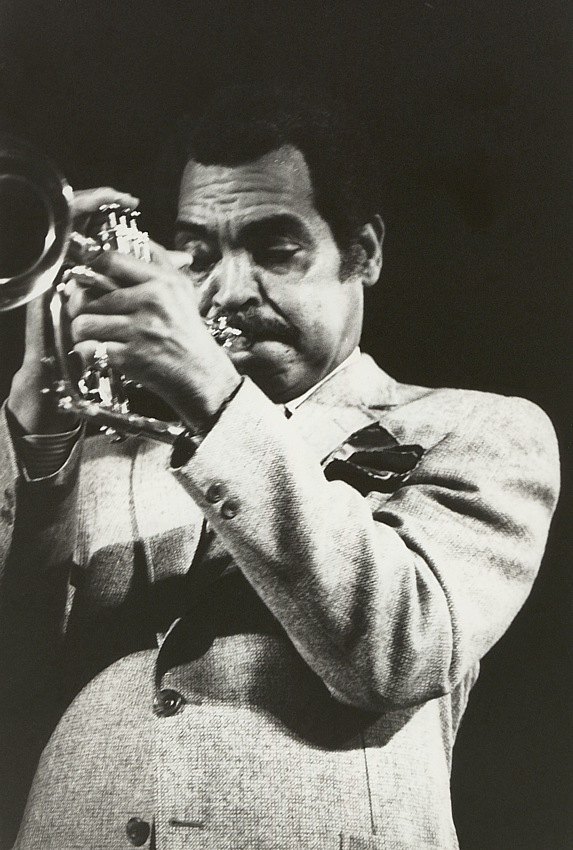
Art Farmer

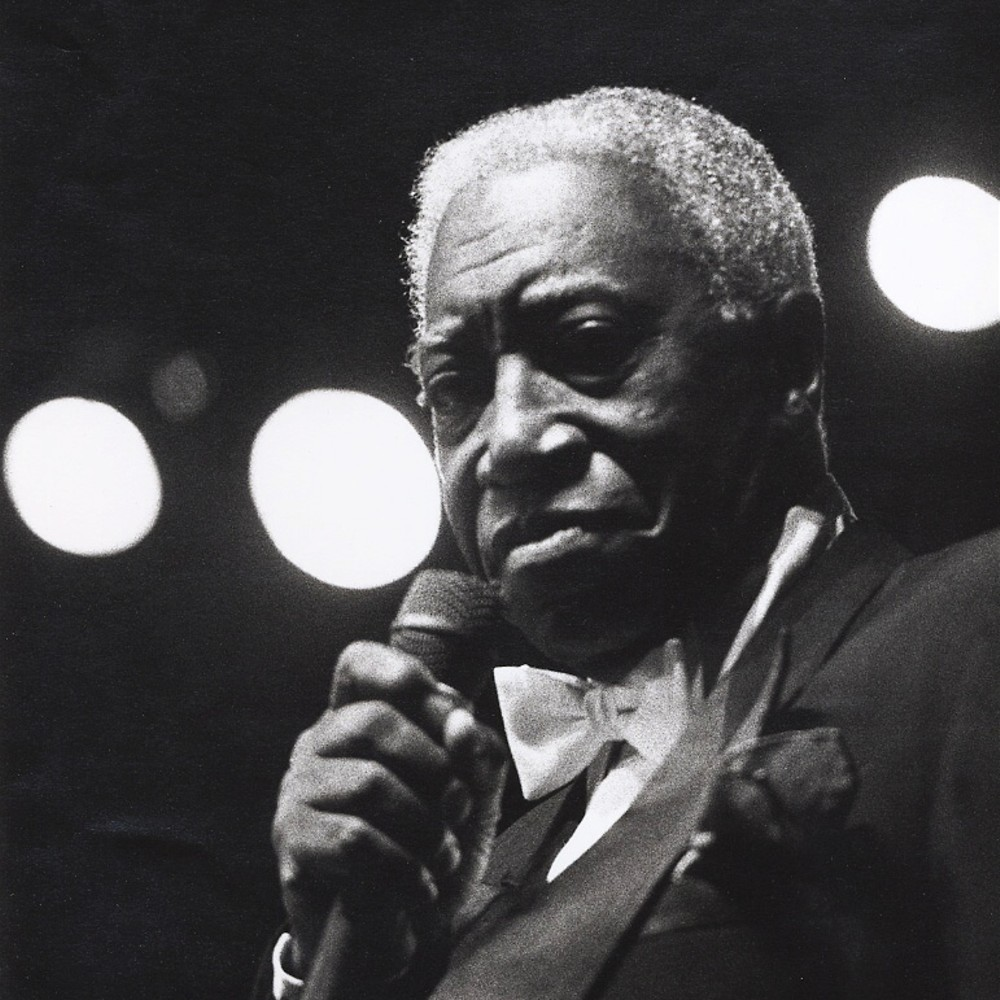
Jazz singer Joe Williams

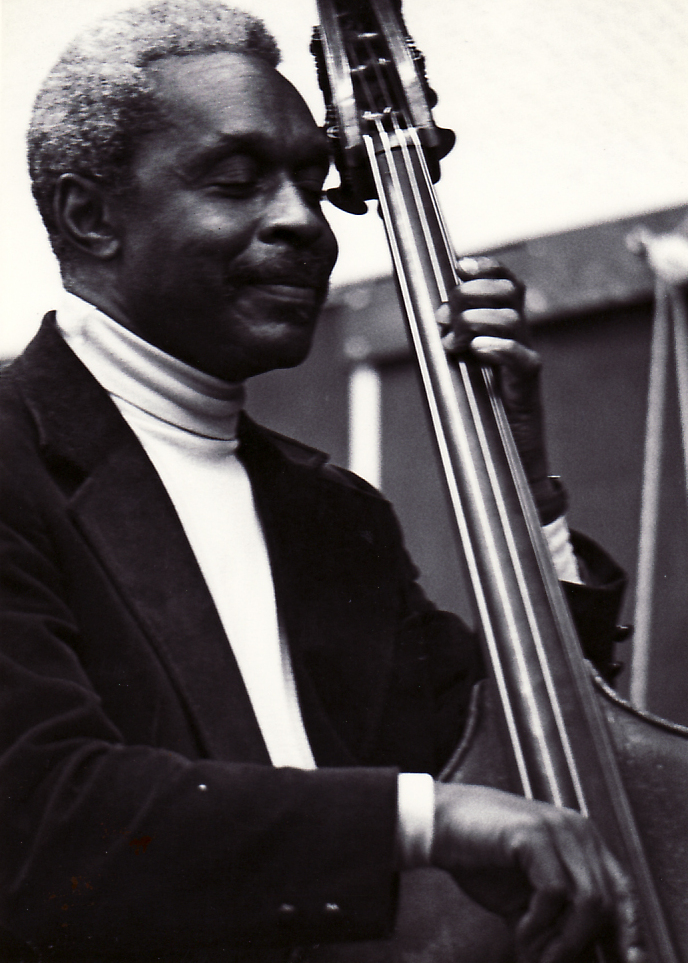
Wyatt Ruther

January

- 6 – Michel Petrucciani, French pianist and composer (born 1962).
- 7 – Fred Hopkins, American upright bassist (born 1947).

February

- 1 – Julius Wechter, American vibraphonist and composer (born 1935).
- 5 – Colin Purbrook, English pianist, upright bassist, and trumpeter (born 1936).
- 6 – Jimmy Roberts, American singer (born 1923).
- 8 – Richard B. Boone, American jazz musician, trombonist, and vocalist (born 1930).
- 7 – Bobby Troup, American pianist and songwriter (born 1918).
- 11 – Jaki Byard, American jazz pianist and composer who also played trumpet and saxophone (born 1922).
- 16 – Betty Roché, American singer (born 1918).
- 19
  - Lauderic Caton, Trinidadian guitarist (born 1910).
  - Trudy Desmond, Canadian singer (born 1945).
- 27 – Horace Tapscott, American pianist and composer (born 1934).

March

- 3 – John Roache, American pianist and composer of Ragtime (born 1940).
- 4 – Teddy McRae, American tenor saxophonist and arranger (born 1908).
- 12 – Yehudi Menuhin, Russian Jewish American violinist and conductor (born 1916).
- 22 – Rick Fay, American clarinetist and saxophonist (born 1926).
- 29 – Joe Williams, American vocalist (born 1918).

April

- 1 – Jesse Stone, American pianist and songwriter (born 1901).
- 3 – Herman Foster, American pianist (born 1928).
- 6 – Red Norvo, American vibraphonist (born 1908).
- 21 – Charles Rogers, American film actor and musician (born 1904).
- 23 – Melba Liston, American trombonist, composer, and musical arranger (born 1926).
- 27 – Al Hirt, American trumpeter and bandleader (born 1922).

May

- 8 – Leon Thomas, American avant-garde jazz singer (born 1937).
- 18 – Freddy Randall, English jazz trumpeter and bandleader (born 1921).
- 19 – Candy Candido, American bassist and vocalist (born 1913).

June

- 2 – Andy Simpkins, American bassist (born 1932).
- 5
  - Ernie Wilkins, American tenor saxophonist (born 1922).
  - Mel Tormé, American singer (born 1925).
- 8 – Rosy McHargue, American clarinetist (born 1902).
- 15 – Fausto Papetti, Italian alto saxophonist (born 1923).

July

- 9 – Talib Dawud, American trumpeter (born 1923).
- 11 – Helen Forrest, American singer (born 1917).
- 22 – Gar Samuelson, American drummer (born 1958).
- 27 – Sweets Edison, American trumpeter (born 1915).

August

- 3 – Leroy Vinnegar, American bassist (born 1928).
- 24 – Warren Covington, American trombonist (born 1921).
- 25 – Spiegle Willcox, American trombonist (born 1903).

September

- 6 – Arnold Fishkind, American bassist (born 1919).
- 8 – Moondog, American musician, composer, theoretician, poet and inventor (born 1916).
- 30 – Anna Mae Winburn, African-American vocalist and bandleader (born 1913).

October

- 2 – Sal Salvador, American bebop jazz guitarist and a prominent music educator (born 1925).
- 4 – Art Farmer, American trumpeter and flugelhorn player (born 1928).
- 8 – Manfredo Fest, Brazilian pianist and keyboardist (born 1936).
- 9 – Milt Jackson, American vibraphonist (born 1923).
- 18 – Tony Crombie, English jazz drummer, pianist, bandleader, and composer (born 1925).
- 21 – LaMont Johnson, American pianist who played in the hard bop and post-bop genres (born 1941).
- 31 – Wyatt Ruther, American upright bassist (born 1923).

November

- 8 – Lester Bowie, American trumpet player and composer (born 1941).
- 13
  - John Benson Brooks, American jazz pianist, songwriter, arranger, and composer (born 1917).
  - Donald Mills, American singer, The Mills Brothers (born 1915).
- 26
  - Clifford Jarvis, American hard bop and free jazz drummer (born 1941).
  - Henry Nemo, American musician, songwriter, and actor (born 1909).
- 30 – Don "Sugarcane" Harris, American violinist (born 1938).

December

- 2 – Charlie Byrd, American guitarist (born 1925).
- 4 – Edward Vesala, Finnish avant-garde jazz composer, bandleader and drummer (born 1945).
- 7 – Kenny Baker, English trumpeter, cornetist, flugelhornist, and composer (born 1921).
- 11 – Charles Earland, American jazz composer, organist and saxophonist in the soul jazz idiom (born 1941).
- 14 – Walt Levinsky, American big band and orchestral player, composer, arranger, and band leader (born 1929).
- 17 – Grover Washington Jr., American saxophonist (born 1943).
- 26 – Curtis Mayfield, American singer and songwriter (born 1942).
- 28 – Terry Rosen, American guitarist, concert promoter and radio DJ (born 1939).
- 30 – Sam Ranelli, American drummer (born 1920).

== Births ==
October

- 3 – Tom Ibarra, French guitarist and composer.

== See also ==
- 1990s in jazz
- List of years in jazz
- 1999 in music
