= Dick Maloney =

Dick Maloney may refer to:

- Dick Maloney (singer) (1933–2010), jazz singer, entertainer and radio host based in Ottawa, Canada
- Dick Maloney (American football) (born 1950), American football coach
