= 1943 in jazz =

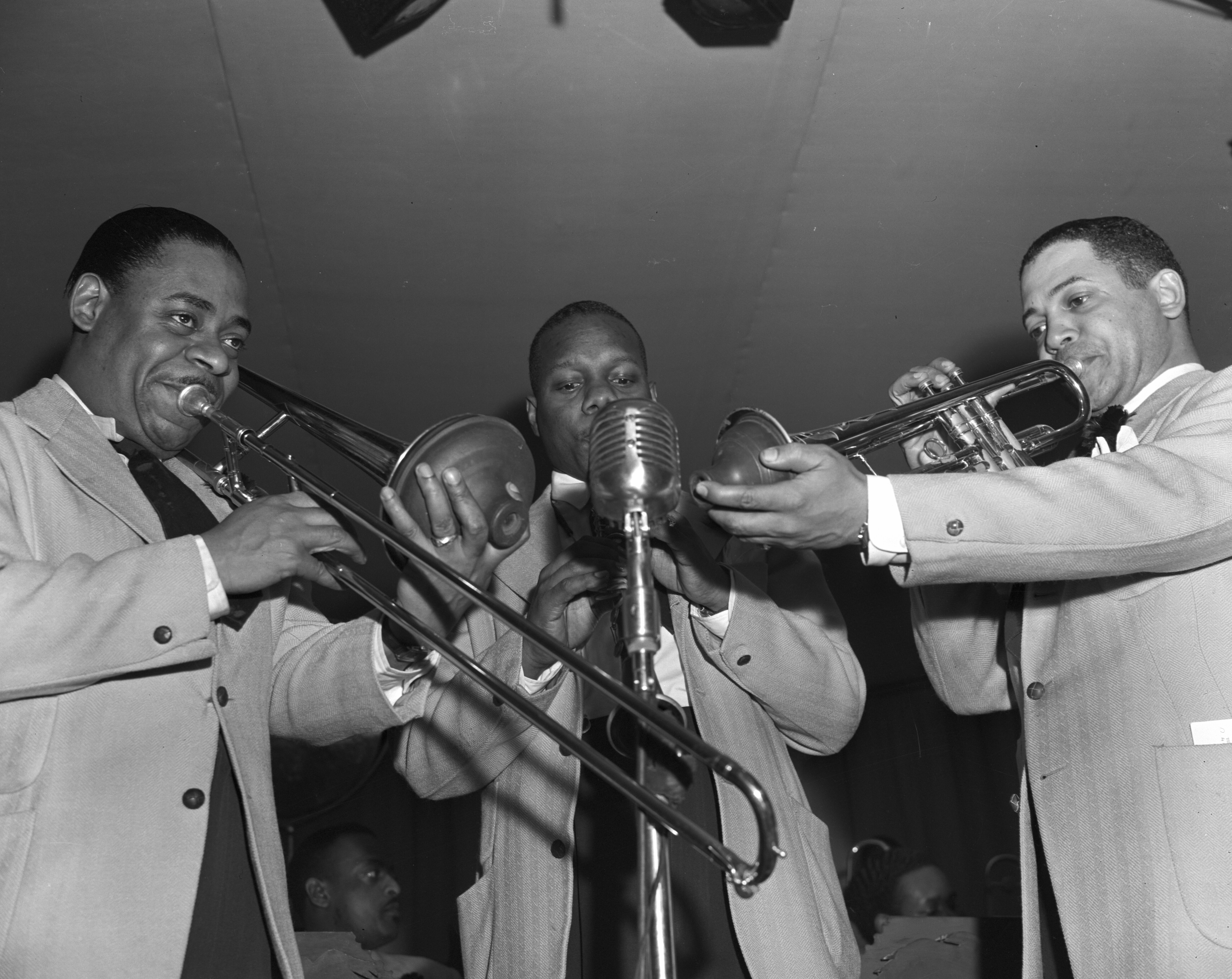
- A trio of musicians from Duke Ellington's orchestra during the early morning broadcast
- Decade: 1940s in jazz
- Music: 1943 in music
- Standards: List of 1940s jazz standards
- See also: 1942 in jazz – 1944 in jazz

This is a timeline documenting events of Jazz in the year 1943.

== Events ==
- The American Federation of Musicians recording ban, called by James Petrillo, continued through 1943. Django Reinhardt records "Cavalerie" on the 17 February 1943 in Paris after an aborted attempt at recording it in 1937.
- The musical Early to Bed, with songs by Fats Waller, premieres at the Shubert Theatre in Boston on 24 May, before moving to the Broadhurst Theatre on 17 June.

== Album releases ==
- Duke Ellington: Black, Brown and Beige (1943)

== Deaths ==
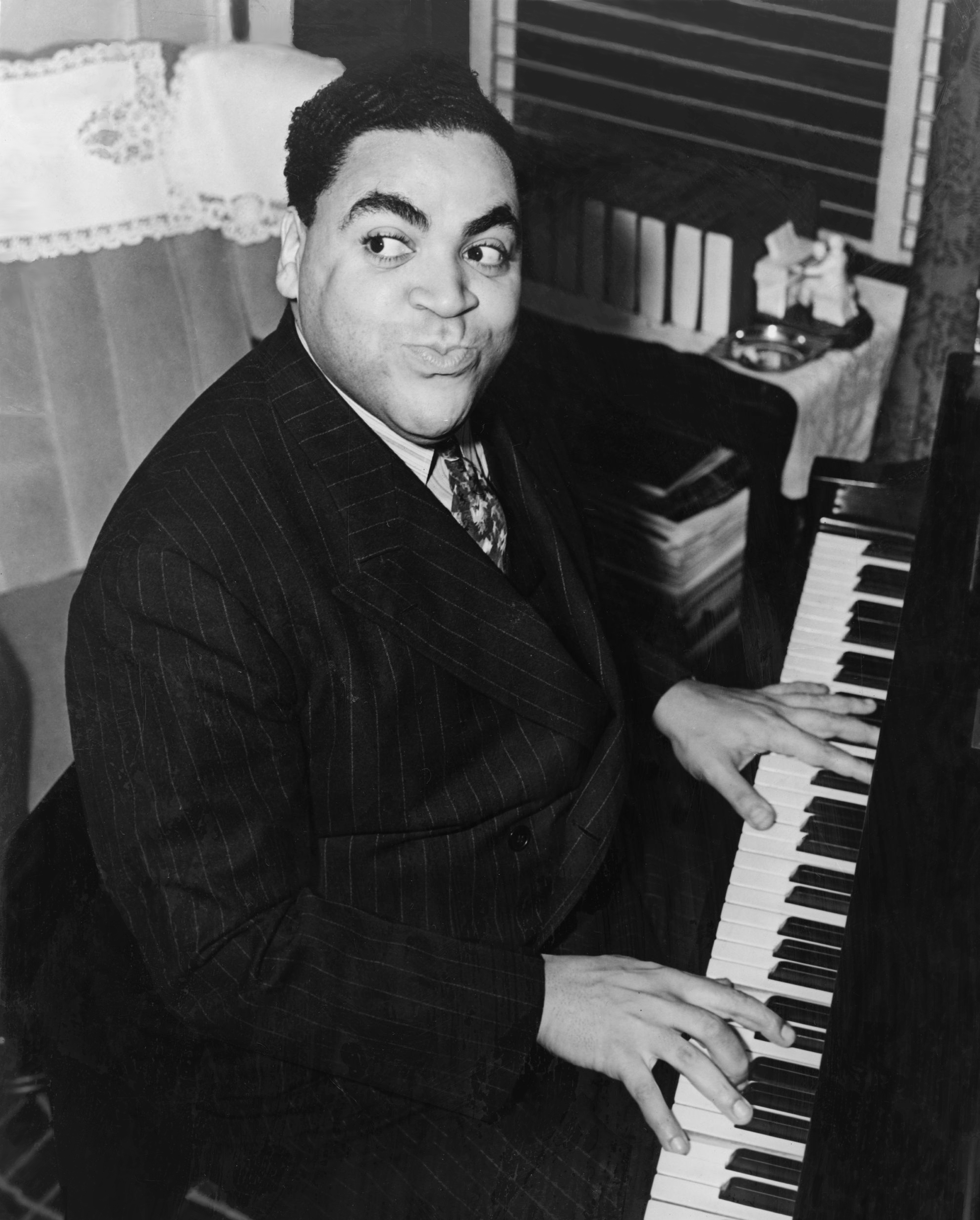
Fats Waller

February

- 17 – Armand J. Piron, American violinist, band leader, and composer (born 1888).
- 22 – Tamara Drasin, American singer and actress (born 1905).

April

- 4 – Tiny Parham, Canadian-born bandleader and pianist (born 1900).

May

- 28 – Vaughn De Leath, American singer (born 1894).

June

- 8 – Min Leibrook, American tubist and bassist (born 1903).

August

- 3 – Corky Cornelius, American trumpeter (born 1914).

October

- 5 – Leon Roppolo, American clarinetist (born 1902).
- 23 – Ben Bernie, American violinist and radio personality (born 1891).

December

- 15 – Fats Waller, American pianist, organist, composer, singer, and comedic entertainer (born 1904).

Unknown date

- Zue Robertson, American trombonist (born 1891).

== Births ==
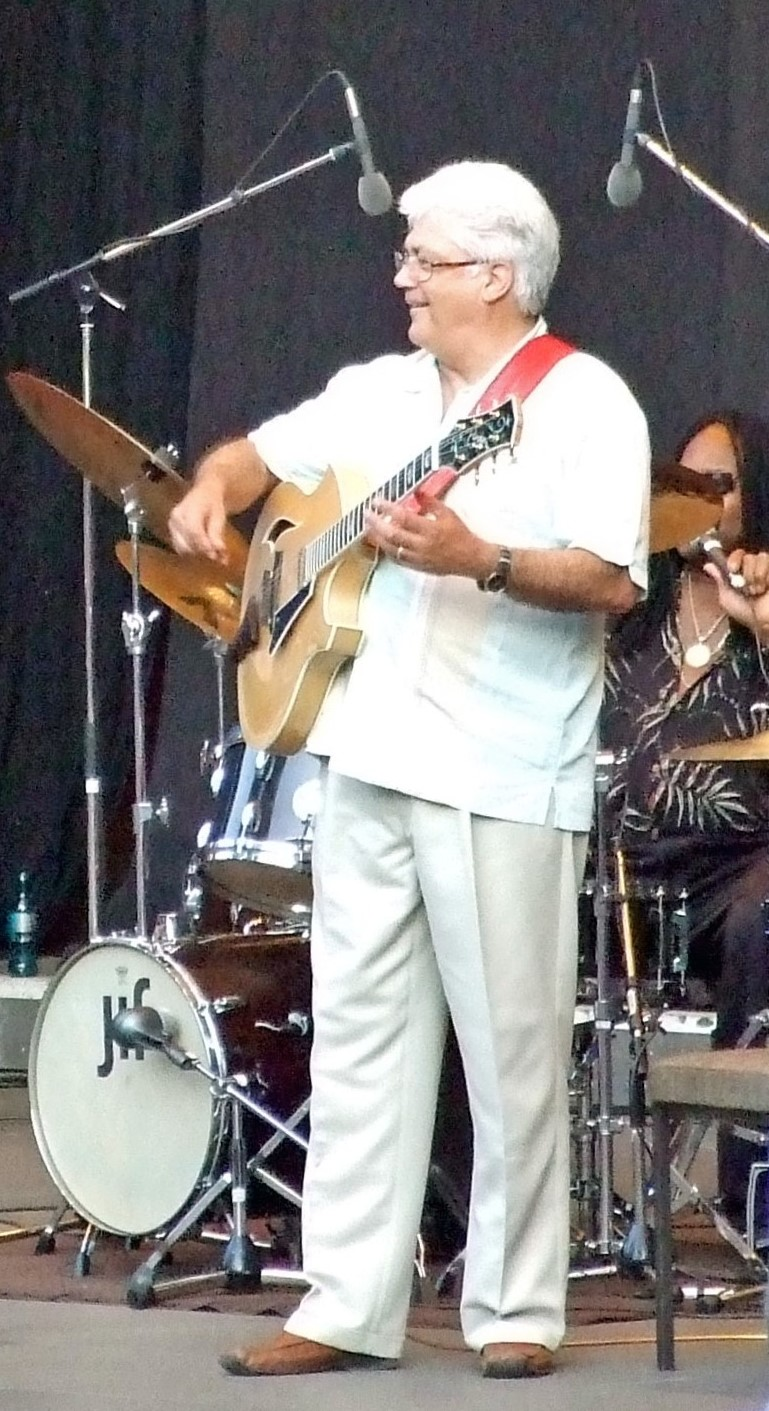
Larry Coryell

January

- 3 – Brian Hopper, British guitarist and saxophonist.
- 6 – Barry Altschul, American drummer.
- 16 – Gavin Bryars, English composer and upright bassist.
- 17 – Billy Harper, American saxophonist.
- 18 – Al Foster, American drummer.
- 20 – Valery Ponomarev, Russian trumpeter.
- 21
  - Steve Gilmore, American upright bassist.
  - Steve Potts, American saxophonist.
- 22
  - Didier Malherbe, French saxophonist, flautist and duduk player.
  - Maarten Altena, Dutch composer and upright bassist.
  - Michal Urbaniak, American musician and composer.
  - Pete Minger, American trumpeter (died 2000).
  - Tony Campise, American saxophonist (died 2010).
- 23 – Gary Burton, American vibraphonist.
- 26 – Leny Andrade, Brazilian singer and musician (died 2023).

February

- 4 – Newman Taylor Baker, African-American drummer.
- 6 – Calvin Keys, American guitarist.
- 14 – Maceo Parker, American saxophonist.
- 19 – Laurie Allan, English drummer, Delivery and Gong.
- 21 – Duncan Swift, British pianist (died 1997).
- 25 – Howie Smith, American saxophonist, composer and educator.
- 28 – Claudio Mattone, Italian composer, lyricist and music producer.

March

- 4 – Lucio Dalla, Italian singer, clarinetist and actor (died 2012).
- 9 – Mayuto Correa, Brazilian percussionist, guitarist, and composer.
- 11 – Richie Pratt, American drummer (died 2015).
- 20 – Jon Christensen, Norwegian drummer and percussionist (died 2020).
- 21 – Vivian Stanshall, English singer-songwriter, musician, author, poet, and wit, Bonzo Dog Doo-Dah Band (died 1995).
- 22
  - George Benson, American guitarist.
  - Keith Relf, English singer and harmonica player, The Yardbirds (died 1976).

April

- 2 – Larry Coryell, American guitarist (died 2017).
- 6
  - Noah Howard, American alto saxophonist (died 2010).
  - Gerry Niewood, American saxophonist (died 2009).
- 8 – Phil Lee, English guitarist.
- 18 – Clyde Stubblefield, American drummer best known for his work with James Brown (kidney failure) (died 2017).
- 27 – Freddie Waits, American drummer (died 1989).

May

- 8 – Jerry Rusch, American trumpeter (died 2003).
- 14 – Jack Bruce, Scottish musician and songwriter (died 2014).
- 20
  - Bobby Enriquez, Filipino pianist (born 1996).
  - Terry Smith, British guitarist.
- 23 – Felix Slováček, Czech clarinetist, conductor, film composer and saxophonist.
- 24 – Gary Burghoff, American actor and singer.
- 30 – Peter Lipa, Slovak singer, composer and promoter of jazz.

June

- 9 – Kenny Barron, American pianist.
- 24 – Frank Lowe, American saxophonist and composer (died 2003).
- 26 – Georgie Fame, English singer and keyboard player.

July

- 4
  - Conny Bauer, German trombonist.
  - Fred Wesley, American trombonist.
- 9 – Manfred Eicher, German record producer, ECM Records.

August

- 10
  - Bjørn Krokfoss, Norwegian drummer.
  - Michael Mantler, Austrian trumpeter and composer.
- 14 – Ben Sidran, American pianist, organist, vocalist and writer.
- 20 – Jiggs Whigham, American trombonist.
- 23 – Pino Presti, Italian bassist, arranger, composer, and conductor.
- 28 – Richard Wright, English keyboardist, composer, singer and songwriter (died 2008).
- 29
  - Dick Halligan, American musician and composer (died 2022).
  - Edu Lobo, Brazilian singer, guitarist, and composer.

September

- 1 – Webster Lewis, American keyboardist (died 2002).
- 3 – Kjell Öhman, Swedish pianist, Hammond organist, and accordionist (died 2015).
- 10
  - David Horler, English trombonist.
  - Garrett List, American trombonist, vocalist and composer (died 2019).
- 14 – Marcos Valle, Brazilian singer, instrumentalist, and songwriter.

October

- 9 – Pete Cosey, American guitarist (died 2012).
- 14 – Fritz Pauer, Austrian pianist, composer, and bandleader (died 2012).
- 22 – Urszula Dudziak, Polish vocalist.
- 27 – Weldon Irvine, American composer, playwright, poet, pianist and organist (died 2002).

November

- 7 – Joni Mitchell, American singer and songwriter.
- 12
  - Claudio Slon, Brazilian drummer (died 2002).
  - Thorgeir Stubø, Norwegian guitarist (died 1986).
- 17
  - Richard Anthony Hewson, English producer, arranger, conductor.
  - Willie Murphy, American singer and pianist (died 2019).
- 22 – Ricky May, New Zealand musician (died 1988).
- 23 – Alan Lawrence Turnbull, Australian drummer (died 2014).
- 28 – Butch Thompson, American pianist and clarinetist (died 2022).

December

- 12 – Grover Washington, Jr., American saxophonist (died 1999).
- 13 – Skip Prokop, Canadian rock and jazz fusion drummer in Lighthouse, The Paupers (died 2017).
- 24 – Volker Kriegel, German guitarist and composer (died 2003).

Unknown date

- Fred Tompkins, American flautist and composer.
- Peter Boothman, Australian guitarist, composer and educator (died 2012).
- Sven-Åke Johansson, Swedish drummer and composer.
- Ted Milton, English poet and musician.
- Winston Mankunku Ngozi, South African tenor saxophonist (died 2009).

== See also ==
- 1940s in jazz
- List of years in jazz
- 1943 in music

== Bibliography ==
- The New Real Book, Volume I. Sher Music. 1988. ISBN 0-9614701-4-3.
- The New Real Book, Volume II. Sher Music. 1991. ISBN 0-9614701-7-8.
- The New Real Book, Volume III. Sher Music. 1995. ISBN 1-883217-30-X.
- The Real Book, Volume I (6th ed.). Hal Leonard. 2004. ISBN 0-634-06038-4.
- The Real Book, Volume II (2nd ed.). Hal Leonard. 2007. ISBN 978-1-4234-2452-9.
- The Real Book, Volume III (2nd ed.). Hal Leonard. 2006. ISBN 0-634-06136-4.
- The Real Jazz Book. Warner Bros. ISBN 978-91-85041-36-7.
- The Real Vocal Book, Volume I. Hal Leonard. 2006. ISBN 0-634-06080-5.
