= Paul Carter Harrison =

American playwright and professor (1936–2021)

Paul Carter Harrison (March 1, 1936 – December 27, 2021) was an American playwright and professor. Harrison was known for works such as his Obie Award winning play The Great MacDaddy and scholarly writings on theater and performance. Between 1962 and 1982, he produced or directed numerous American and Dutch plays and screenplays.

== Early years ==
Paul Carter Harrison was an African American, born on March 1, 1936, to Thelma Inez and Paul Randolph Harrison who were born in North and South Carolina but raised in New York City. His brother, Kenneth Allen Harrison was the first black basketball player on scholarship at Villanova University. Harrison attended Commerce High School and graduated in 1952. While attending New York University, Harrison was introduced to many writers and theater artists such as Lou Gossett, Jr., Billy Dee Williams, Amiri Baraka (LeRoi Jones), and Ted Joans. He transferred to Indiana University where he interacted with musicians such as Freddie Hubbard, Larry Ridley, and David Baker.

== Biography ==
Born in New York City, Harrison earned a Bachelor of Arts in liberal arts from Indiana University Bloomington in 1957. Harrison earned an M.A. in psychology and phenomenology from New York City's New School for Social Research in 1962. He then went to live in Europe to write and direct for the theater.

Harrison taught theater at Howard University from 1968 to 1970. His students included Phylicia Rashad, Debbie Allen, Linda Goss, Pearl Cleage and Clinton Turner Davis.

While teaching at California State University, Sacramento (1970–1972), Harrison helped conceive and directed Melvin Van Peebles' "Ain't Supposed To Die a Natural Death" prior to its Broadway production, and wrote his play The Great MacDaddy which was produced by the Negro Ensemble Company in 1973, and won an Obie Award.

Harrison taught at the University of Massachusetts Amherst from 1972 to 1976 before moving on to Columbia College Chicago in 1976 to work as Chair, Professor, and Writer in Residence at the Theatre Department until his retirement in 2002. He was Professor Emeritus.

Harrison died on December 27, 2021, at the age of 85 at a retirement home in Atlanta.

== Europe ==
After graduating from the New School, Harrison went to Spain and the Netherlands for seven years where he worked on his writing and theatre skills. He lived in Amsterdam from 1960 to 1967. During his time out of the country he wrote a movie called "Stranger On The Square". His first book of edited essays "The Modern Drama Footnote", was published in Amsterdam, as well as his plays, "Pavane for a Deadpan Minstrel" and "Tophat". Other plays written, performed and directed in the Netherlands included, "The Post Clerks" and "The Experimental Leader", the latter becoming the center piece for his book commonly known as "Dialogue from the Opposition". However, since the English version of this work isn't available the title "Dialogue from the Opposition" seems to be a rather tame re-translation of its Dutch version's title. The Dutch publication is named "Dialoog van het verzet" which is more accurately translated as "Dialogue of (the) resistance/rebellion". The original English title as it was written by Harrison is noted in the book by Dutch translators (friend of Harrison: H.J.A. Hofland and, Carla van Splunteren) as "A Rebel's Dialogue". While living in Amsterdam, Harrison married the Dutch actress, Ria Vroemen who gave birth to his daughter, Fonteyn in 1963.

== Accomplishments ==
On August 6 of 1988, Paul Carter Harrison married his wife, Wanda Malone. Harrison's work as a playwright and theatre theorist has been published and produced in Europe and the United States, causing him to win awards for his work. His play, "Great Macdaddy" won an Obie Award and "Tabernacle" won the Audelco Award for Best Creative Musical. He also has written and edited many other plays, anthologies, and books that involved theatre and jazz performers. "The Drama of Nommo" is a book he wrote, which is a collection of essays that identified African retentions in the aesthetic of African American culture and has helped many directors in the Black Theatre practice. Harrison is known for coming up with terms such as "Nommo" and Mother/Word" as constructive references for Black Theatre. His most recent book, "Black Theatre: Ritual Performance in the African Diaspora", was published in the Spring of 2002. His most recent task was writing the libretto for "Doxology Opera: the Doxy Canticles", a full-length opera composed by Wendell Logan which was premiered in a concert version at the Chicago Museum of Contemporary Art in 2002. He has also written the text for the operetta, "Goree Crossing" with music by Olu Dara that was also given a concert performance at the Museum of Science and Industry in Chicago. As Dramaturg for the ETA Theatre in Chicago, Harrison developed Marcia Leslie's highly successful play, "The Trial of One Short-sighted Black Woman vs Mammie Louise and Safreeta Mae". His most recent conceptualization and direction is "Sweet Thunder: the Billie Strayhorn Story" which has been performed at the Phoenix Black Theatre Troupe and the Kuntu Repertory Theatre in Pittsburgh. He was living in New York City and continued to travel to Spain every year with his daughter.

== Bibliography ==
- The Drama of Nommo and Totem Voices: Plays From the Black World Repertory (1972) ISBN 978-0-8021-3126-3
- Kuntu Drama: Plays of the African Continuum (1974) ISBN 978-0-394-17806-6
- Black Light: The African American Hero (1993) ISBN 978-1-56025-060-9
- Classic Plays from the Negro Ensemble Company (1995) ISBN 978-0-8229-5560-3
- Black Theatre: Ritual Performance in the African Diaspora (2002) ISBN 978-1-56639-944-9
