= Stan Brenders =

Belgian jazz pianist and bandleader

Stan Constant Brenders (May 31, 1904, Brussels - June 1, 1969, Brussels) was a Belgian jazz pianist and bandleader, who founded the first jazz radio orchestra in Belgium and recorded with Django Reinhardt.
