= Maurice J. Summerfield =

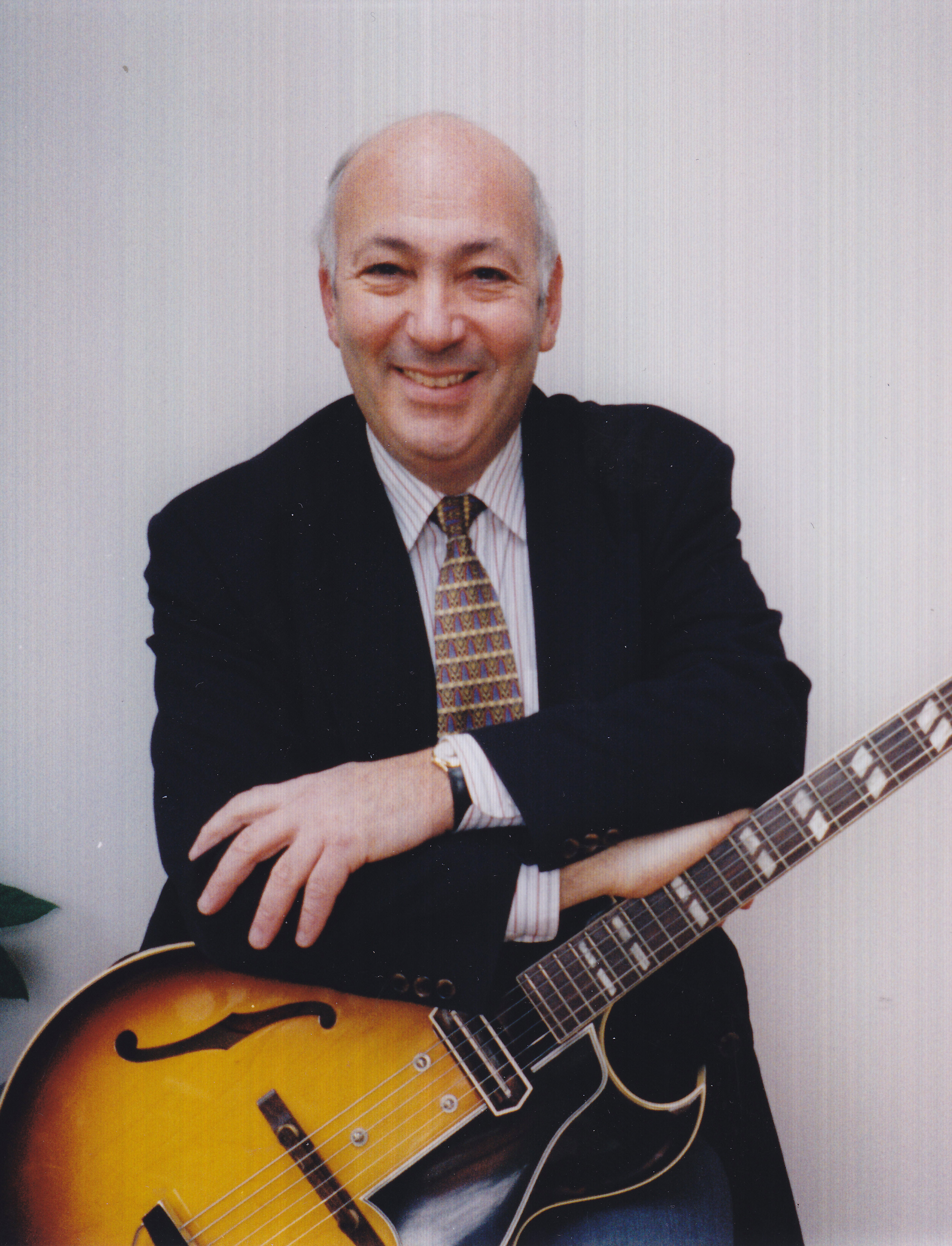
- Maurice Joseph Summerfield

Background information
- Born: Maurice Joseph Summerfield; 4 February 1940 (age 86); Newcastle-upon-Tyne, England
- Genres: Jazz, classical
- Occupations: Musician, author, publisher, businessman
- Instrument: Guitar

Maurice Joseph Summerfield (born 4 February 1940) is a British guitarist, author, publisher, and businessman. He is the founder of Classical Guitar magazine. He produced several recordings for his company's label, Guitar Masters Records, from 1981 to 1985.

== Career ==
Maurice Summerfield was born in Newcastle-upon-Tyne in the UK. He played the guitar professionally in jazz groups and dance bands in the North East of England in his late teens and early twenties. In 1957 he studied with Ivor Mairants in London and in the same year made first contact with guitarist Barney Kessel. During the next year he joined the family business, which was founded in 1900. Several years later he began importing and selling musical instruments and products made by Ibanez, Guild Guitar Company, CSL and Levin, Tama, D'Addario, C. F. Martin & Company, Savarez, and La Bella. The company emphasized guitar, fretted instruments, and accessories.

Summerfield instigated the production of the first authentic reproductions (CSL 'Gypsy' range) of the original 1930s Maccaferri/Selmer guitars used by Django Reinhardt and the Joe Pass JP20 guitar for the Ibanez company. He has had a special relationship over many years with Jorge Morel, Argentinian guitarist. He produced three recordings and published 15 volumes of guitar solos and arrangements by Morel. In 1978 Summerfield established the Ashley Mark Publishing Company, a mail order business that sold guitar books and music. In 1981 he founded Guitar Masters Records, a company producing guitar recordings by David Russell, Jorge Morel, Jorge Cardoso, Maria Isabel Siewers, Neil Smith, and Krzysztof Pelech.

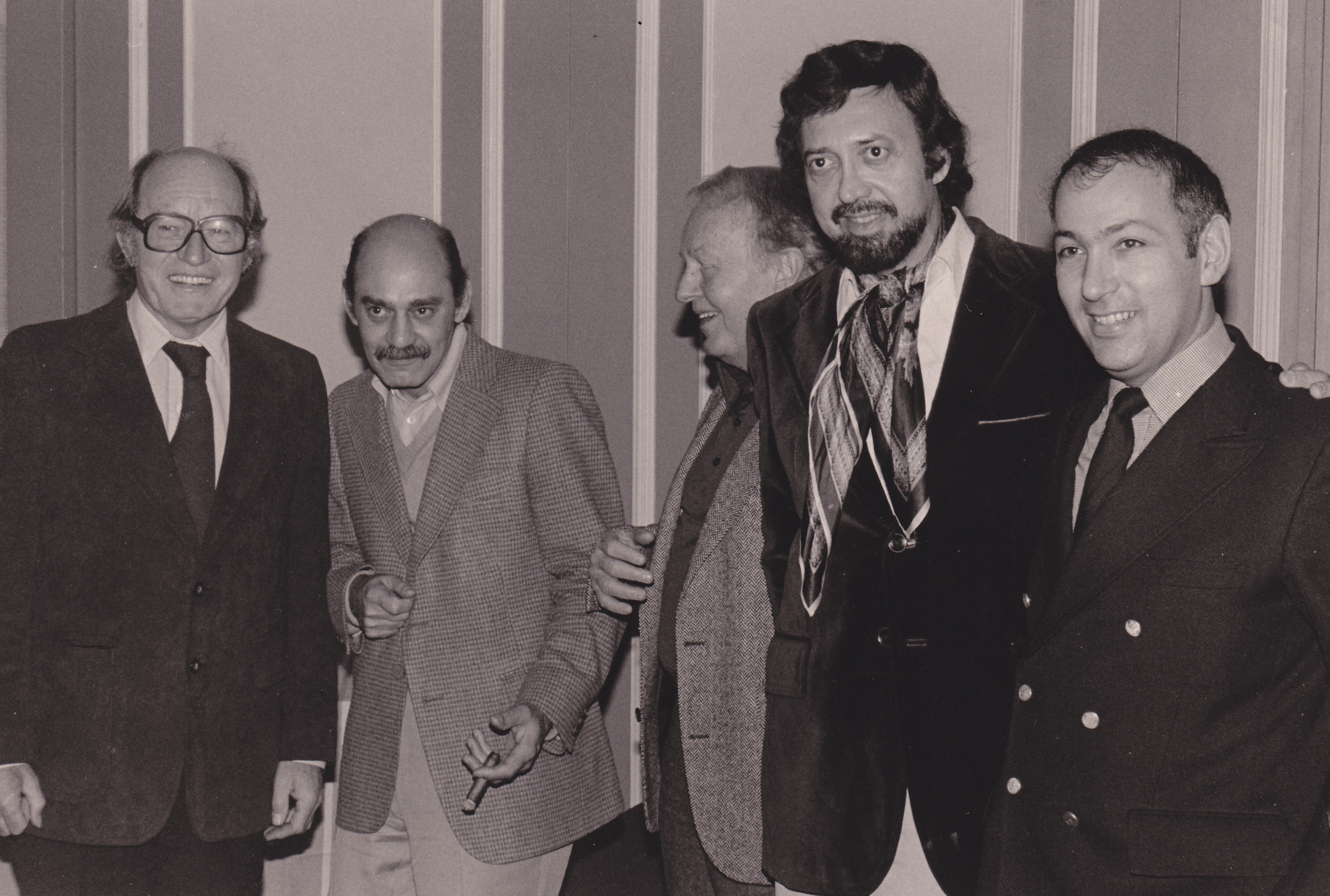
Maurice J. Summerfield with (right to left) Barney Kessel, Herb Ellis, Joe Pass, and Charlie Byrd

Summerfield developed a close relationship with Barney Kessel, resulting in his presenting the guitarist in concert and master classes, publishing three volumes of guitar solos, and writing the Kessel's authorized biography. In 1976 Summerfield and two friends founded the Guitar Appreciation Society of North East England. This society presented classical, jazz, and flamenco guitarists in concert in the Newcastle-upon-Tyne area.

In September 1982 he founded Classical Guitar magazine. He sold this magazine to String Letter Media (US) in 2014.

Summerfield promoted many concerts, including an annual classical guitar series at the Wigmore Hall in London. Starting in 1984, these concerts featured guitarists from different countries. From 1991 Summerfield helped organize, with the Edward James Foundation, the first twenty annual international classical guitar festivals at West Dean College in West Sussex, UK.

For over 38 years Summerfield was a council member of the UK's Music Industries Association (MIA-formerly AMII and then AMI) general committee. In July 1997 he was elected to the Freedom of the Worshipful Company of Musicians (The Musicians Company) a City of London livery company. In December 1997 he received the Freedom of the City of London. In October 2003 he was elected to serve on the Court of the Musicians Company and was installed as its Master in November 2009. In May 2010 Summerfield was made an Honorary Associate of the Royal Academy of Music.

In June 2013 he was inducted into the Guitar Foundation of America's Hall of Fame in Louisville, Kentucky. In 2015 he donated part of his archives to the International Guitar Research Centre (IGRC) at the University of Surrey under the name The Maurice J. Summerfield Collection.

In January 2021 Maurice Summerfield received the National Association of Music Merchants (NAMM) Believe in Music Award in a special online event.

== Selected bibliography ==
=== Books ===
- Bacon, Tony. The Ibanez Electric Guitar Book. Backbeat: Milwaukee, Wisconsin, 2013. ISBN 978-1-61713-453-1
- Charle, Francois. The Story of Selmer-Maccaferri Guitars. F. Charle: Paris, 1999. ISBN 978-2951351615
- D'Addario: The Player's Choice 1905–2005. D'Addario, 2005.
- Specht, Paul. Ibanez: The Untold Story. Hoshino: Bensalem, Pennsylvania, 2005. ISBN 0-9764277-0-2
- Summerfield, Maurice. The Classical Guitar: Its Evolution and Its Players Since 1800. Ashley Mark: Blaydon on Tyne, 2002. (Five editions 1982, 1991, 1992, 1996, 2002) ISBN 1-872639-46-1
- Summerfield, Maurice. The Jazz Guitar: Its Evolution, Players and Personalities Since 1900. Ashley Mark, 1998. (Four editions 1978, 1979, 1993, 1998) ISBN 1-872639-26-7
- Summerfield, Maurice. Barney Kessel: A Jazz Legend. Ashley Mark: Blaydon on Tyne, 2008. ISBN 978-1-872639-69-7
- Wright, Michael. Guitar Stories. Vintage Guitar Books: Bismarck, North Dakota, 1995. ISBN 978-1-884883-08-8

=== Articles ===
- "The Summerfield Story", Music Trade International, August 1978
- Interview, Swiat Gitary, August 2004
- "The Summerfield Story", Music Trade News, July 2007
- "Maurice Summerfield – Man of Many Talents", Just Jazz Guitar magazine, May 2011
- "The Mind of Maurice", Classical Guitar magazine, September 2015
