= Ramón Carranza =

Venezuelan politician (1940–2003)

Ramon "Moncho" Carranza
- Also known as: "Moncho"
- Born: Ramon Carranza Lazo; October 1, 1940
- Origin: Barquisimeto, Edo. Lara, Venezuela
- Died: 5 January 2003 (aged 62)
- Genres: Latin jazz, bebop, post-bop, hard bop, free jazz, modal jazz
- Occupations: Saxophonist, composer, teacher
- Instruments: Soprano saxophone, Alto saxophone, Tenor saxophone, Baritone saxophone, flute, clarinet
- Years active: 45
- Label: Independent
- Formerly of: Aldemaro Romero, Mario Rivera, Socrates de Leon, Manolo Freites, Lorenzo Blanco

Ramon "Moncho" Carranza Lazo (1940–2003) was a Venezuelan jazz saxophonist and composer.

== Biography ==
=== Early life and career ===
He was born in Barquisimeto. "Moncho" started his career at an early age in Barquisimeto with drums and trumpet. He later developed an interest for the clarinet, motivated by Ugo Stegnani. He occupied outstanding spots in famous regional orchestras, such as the Orquesta Filarmonica de Lara. He moved to Caracas to further develop his Saxophone skills. From 1979 to 1984, he was part of the Orquesta Filarmonica de Caracas, and invited many times to play with the Orquesta Sinfonica de Venezuela and the Orquesta Sinfonica Municipal.

=== Projects and fellow musicians ===
He was involved in several musical projects in his life long career:

- Festival "Onda Nueva" - Aldemaro Romero, Dave Grusig, Tom Scott, Joe Sample, Zimbo Trio, Milton Nascimento, Ástor Piazzolla, Paul Muriat, Paquito D'Rivera.

=== Discography ===
- Carranza Jazz (1996)
- Carranza Jazz Vol 2 (2001)

== See also ==
- Venezuelan music
