= 1995 in jazz =

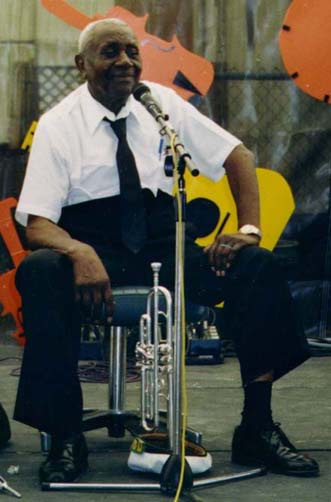
- Trumpeter and bandleader Doc Paulin at 1995 New Orleans Jazz & Heritage Festival.
- Decade: 1990s in jazz
- Music: 1995 in music
- Standards: List of post-1950 jazz standards
- See also: 1994 in jazz – 1996 in jazz

This is a timeline documenting events of Jazz in the year 1995.

== Events ==
=== April ===
- 7 – The 22nd Vossajazz started in Vossavangen, Norway (April 7 – 9).

=== May ===
- 23 – The 23rd Nattjazz started in Bergen, Norway (May 23 – June 4).

=== June ===
- 2 – The 24th Moers Festival started in Moers, Germany (June 2 – 5).
- 29 – The 16th Montreal International Jazz Festival started in Canada (June 29 – July 9).

=== July ===
- 1 – The 5th Jazz Fest Wien started in Wien, Austria (July 1 – 12).
- 7 – The 29th Montreux Jazz Festival started in Switzerland (July 7 – 22).
- 14 – The 20th North Sea Jazz Festival started in The Hague, Netherlands (July 14 – 16).
- 15 – The 30th Pori Jazz Festival started in Finland (July 15 – 23).
- 17 – The 36th Moldejazz started in Molde, Norway (July 17 – 22).
  - The 48th Nice Jazz Festival started in France (July 7 – 16).
- 21 – The 30th San Sebastian Jazz Festival started in San Sebastian, Spain (July 21 – 25).

=== August ===
- 11 – The 12th Brecon Jazz Festival started in Brecon, Wales (August 11 – 13).

=== September ===
- 15 – The 38th Monterey Jazz Festival started in Monterey, California (September 15 – 17).

=== Unknown date ===
- The Thelonious Monk Institute of Jazz opens their first performance classes of jazz.

== Album releases ==
- Butch Morris: Testament
- Dave Douglas: In Our Lifetime
- Matthew Shipp: The Flow of X
- Charlie Hunter: Bing, Bing, Bing!
- Marvin Peterson: African Portraits
- Guy Klucevsek: Citrus My Love
- Marty Ehrlich: Just Before The Dawn
- Matthew Shipp: Symbol Systems
- Gerry Hemingway: Marmalade King
- Steve Turre: Rhythm Within
- Medeski Martin and Wood: Friday Afternoon in the Universe
- Reggie Workman: Cerebral Caverns
- Muhal Richard Abrams: One Line, Two Views
- Dave Douglas: Five
- Bill Frisell: Go West
- Pat Metheny Group: We Live Here
- Henry Threadgill: Makin' a Move
- Dave Holland: Dream of the Elders
- Paul Plimley: Everything in Stage
- John Scofield: Groove Elation
- Chick Corea Quartet: Time Warp
- Matthew Shipp: Before the World
- Don Byron: Music for Six Musicians
- Uri Caine: Toys
- Carol Sloane with Phil Woods: The Songs Carmen Sang
- Michael Franks: Abandoned Garden
- Roy Campbell:Communion
- Marilyn Crispell: Destiny
- David S. Ware: Cryptology
- Stanley Clarke, Al Di Meola, Jean-Luc Ponty: The Rite of Strings

== Deaths ==
January

- 1 – Jess Stacy, American pianist (born 1904).

February

- 6 – Art Taylor, American drummer (born 1929).

March

- 5 – Vivian Stanshall, English singer-songwriter, musician, author, poet, and wit, Bonzo Dog Doo-Dah Band (born 1943).
- 30 – Rozelle Claxton, American pianist (born 1913).
- 31 – Max Brüel, Danish pianist and saxophonist (born 1927).

April

- 2 – Julius Hemphill, American composer and saxophonist (born 1938).

May

- 7 – Ray McKinley, American drummer, singer, and bandleader (born 1910).
- 9 – Marshall Royal, American clarinetist and alto saxophonist (born 1912).
- 10
  - Jimmy Raney, American guitarist (born 1927).
  - Karl Drewo, Austrian saxophonist (born 1929).
- 15 – Minoru Matsuya, Japanese pianist (born 1910).
- 23 – Mick Pyne, English pianist (born 1940).

June

- 4 – Earle Warren, American alto saxophonist and singer (born 1914).
- 5 – Bucky Calabrese, American upright bassist (born 1927).
- 30 – Phyllis Hyman, American singer and actress (born 1949).

July

- 13 – Aimé Barelli, French trumpeter, vocalist, and band leader (born 1917).
- 22 – Percy Humphrey, American trumpeter and bandleader (born 1905).

August

- 11 – Phil Harris, American comedian, actor, singer, and musician (born 1904).
- 20 – John Gilmore, American saxophonist (born 1931).

September

- 12 – Larry Gales, American upright bassist (born 1936).

October

- 19 – Don Cherry, American trumpeter (born 1936).

November

- 19 – Don Goldie, American trumpeter (born 1930).

December

- 30 – Ralph Flanagan, American pianist, composer, and arranger (born 1914).

Unknown date

- Jacques Denjean, French composer and arranger, Les Double Six (born 1929).
- Roger Chaput, French guitarist and visual artist, Quintette du Hot Club de France (born 1909).

== Births ==
April

- 21 – Alma Macbride, American pianist, composer, and film maker.

May

- 9 – Andrea Motis, Spanish singer and trumpeter.

Unknown date

- 9 – Selma French Bolstad, Norwegian singer, fiddler, and composer.

== See also ==
- 1990s in jazz
- List of years in jazz
- 1995 in music
