= Teddy Petersen =

Danish bandleader (1892–1991)

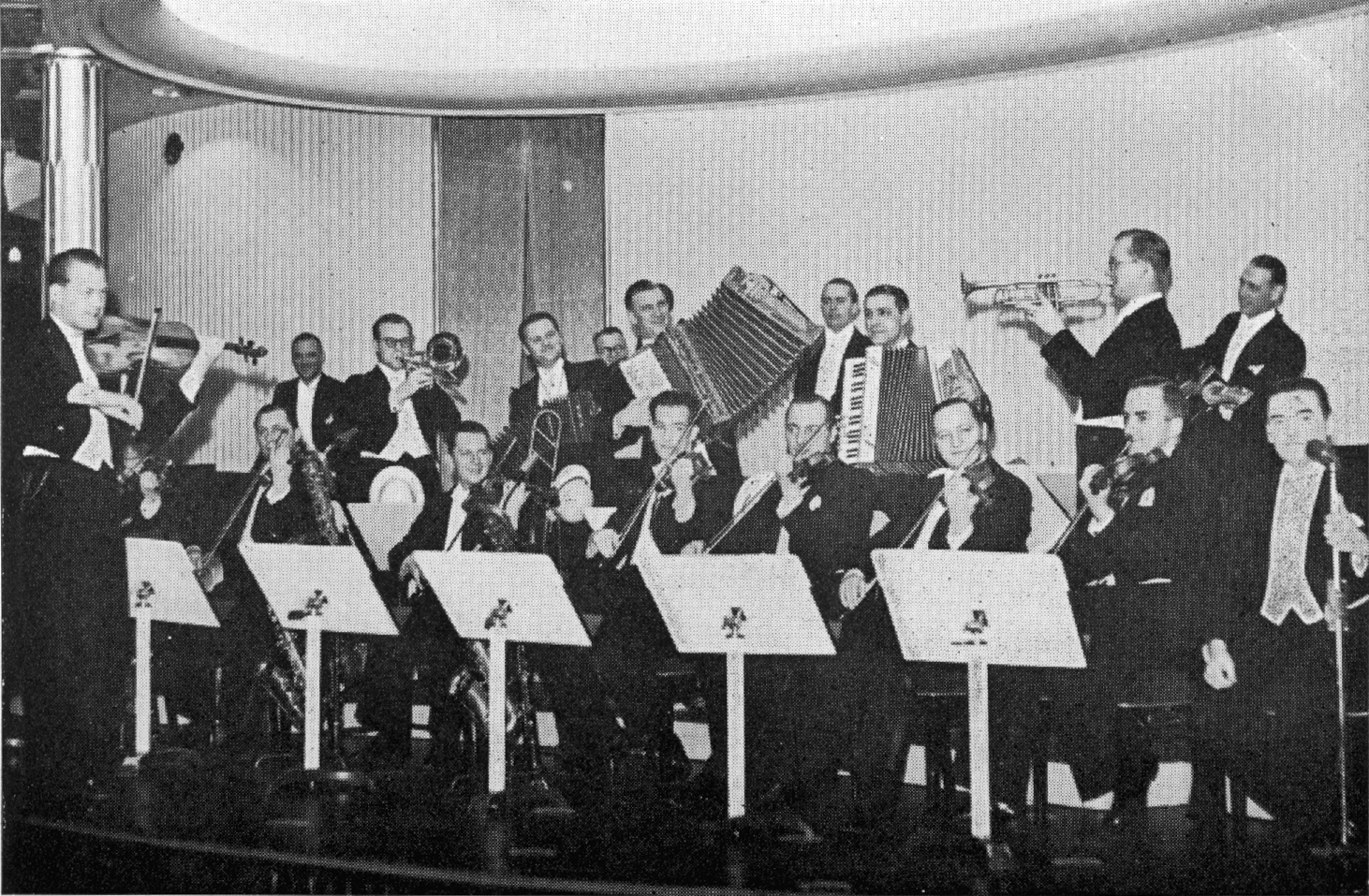
Teddy Petersen's orchestra circa 1941

Teddy Petersen (21 November 1892 – 15 April 1991) was a Danish bandleader and violinist. He was formally trained at the conservatory in Copenhagen and worked with many orchestras, directed music for numerous films, and recorded approximately 1,000 records.

== Personal life ==
Petersen married Jenny Koefoed on 17 May 1919.

== Filmography (as conductor) ==
- 1938 - Bolettes brudefærd
- 1940 - En pige med pep
- 1940 - Sørensen og Rasmussen
- 1941 - Far skal giftes
- 1942 - Frk. Vildkat
- 1942 - A Gentleman in Top Hat and Tails
- 1942 - Lykken kommer
- 1943 - Alt for karrieren
- 1944 - Det bødes der for
- 1945 - Man elsker kun en gang
- 1949 - Lejlighed til leje
- 1950 - Min kone er uskyldig
