= Knut Kiesewetter =

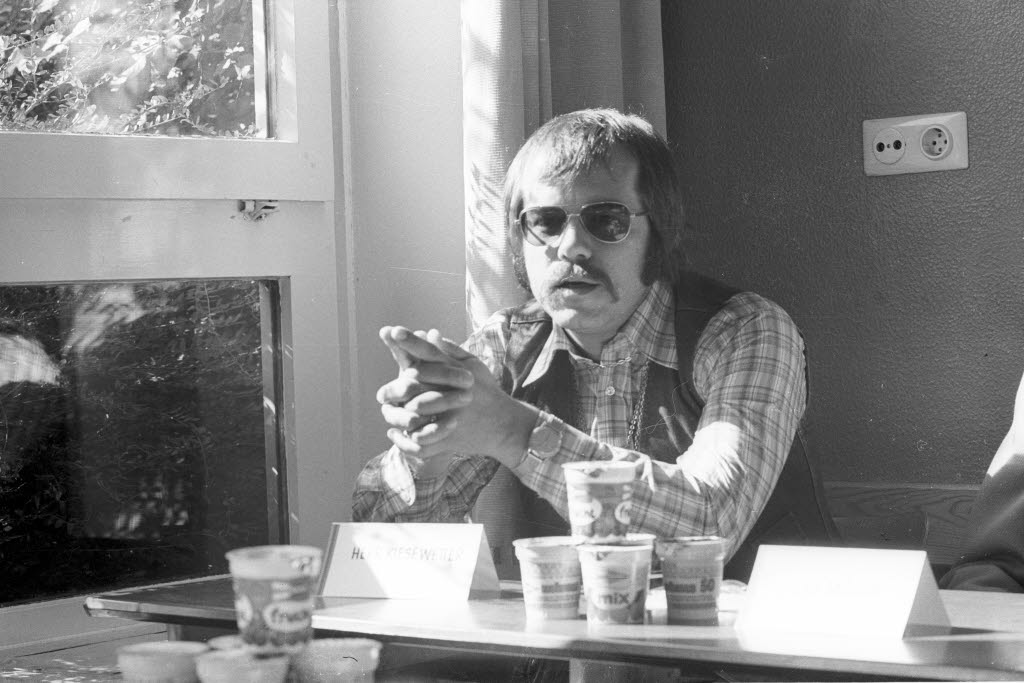
Knut Kiesewetter

Knut Kiesewetter (13 September 1941 – 28 December 2016) was a German jazz musician, singer, songwriter, and producer.

Kiesewetter was born in Stettin (Szczecin). He began his career in the age of 14, playing trombone and singing. He issued his first single at the age of 19. As a songwriter, his songs were recorded by Gitte Haenning and Eartha Kitt, among others. As a producer he worked together with Hannes Wader, Volker Lechtenbrink, and Fiede Kay. He became very popular throughout the 1970s with his songs in Low German, such as "Fresenhof" and "De Möhl".

He taught at the Hochschule für Musik und Theater Hamburg. Kiesewetter died on 28 December 2016 at the age of 75.

== Discography ==
- 1964: Songs und Balladen (mit Hartmut und Sigrun Kiesewetter)
- 1964: Halleluja - Deutsche Spirituals (Polydor)
- 1968: The Gospel Train
- 1968: Happy Dixie
- 1972: Das darf doch nicht wahr sein (Somerset)
- 1972: Die besten Ostfriesenwitze vertellt vun Knut Kiesewetter
- 1973: Ihr solltet mich nicht vergessen (BASF)
- 1974: Keiner hat mich richtig lieb (Polydor)
- 1976: Leeder vun mien Fresenhof (Polydor)
- 1976: Vom Traum ein großer Mann zu sein
- 1978: Wo büst du ween
- 1980: Jazz Again (Polydor)
- 1982: So sing ich nur für dich
- 1987: Wiehnachtstied op uns Fresenhof
- 1989: Wenn man nicht in ist (BMG Ariola)
- 1991: Morgenlicht (Dino, Knut Kiesewetter und Familie)
- 2005: Wiehnachtstied (4 CD)
- 2007: 50 Years on Stage (4 CD)
