= Harrison Ridley Jr. =

Harrison Ridley Jr. (October 22, 1938 – February 19, 2009) was an American radio broadcaster and music critic.

== Life ==
Ridley was the host of The Historical Approach to the Positive Music radio show on WRTI (90.1 FM). The "historical approach" Ridley took was to focus on one musician per show, sometimes on a specific period in the musician's career.

Dubbed a "walking encyclopedia of jazz" Ridley was in demand on radio and television. He was an archivist for the Philadelphia Clef Club of Jazz and Performing Arts.

== Teaching and outreach ==
Ridley did not use the term "jazz," opting instead for "this music referred to as jazz" or simply, "the positive music." He taught music history at Temple University and Villanova University. He was a custodian for the Philadelphia School District for 39 years. He visited schools to teach students, parents, and staff about jazz.

== Awards and honors ==
Ridley received more than 80 awards, including recognition from the Philadelphia City Hall and the Pennsylvania House of Representatives, and an honorary doctorate in Music from Villanova University (given in May 2008). He also worked as a consultant for the Library of Congress.

== Death ==
Ridley died on February 19, 2009, weeks after a stroke.

== Collector ==
A record collector and archivist, Ridley over fifty years, amassed more than 8,500 LPs, 3,000 78s, 200 45s, 300 CDs, and 6,000 books on African American history and music. He specialized in Duke Ellington albums (he had more than 600) and Benny Carter (he had 200 Benny Carter albums).
