= Tom Ibarra =

French jazz guitarist and composer (born 1999)

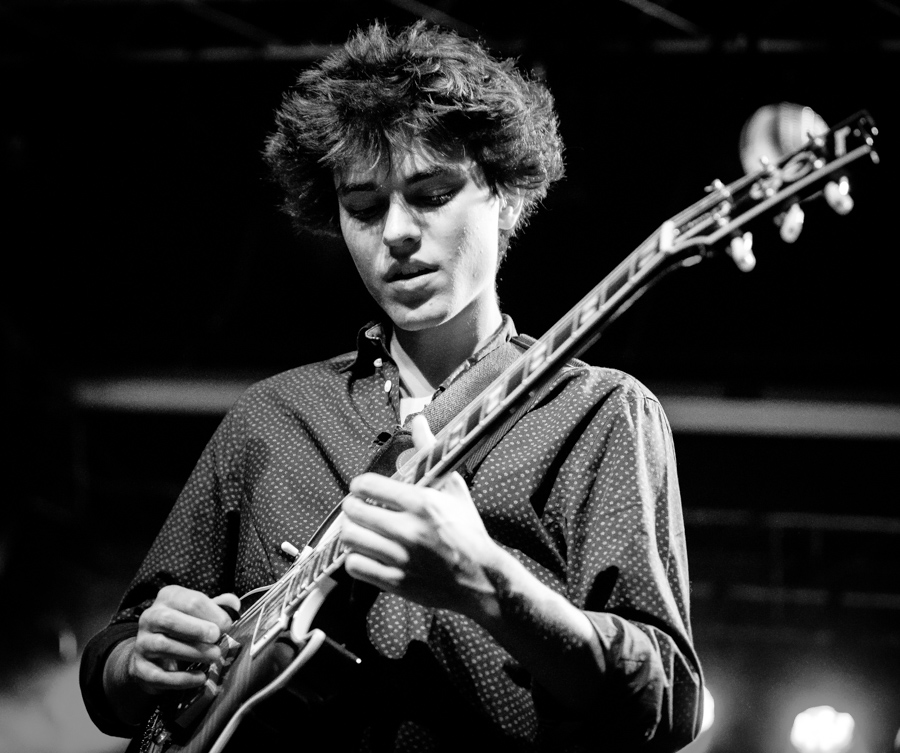
Ibarra at the 2018 Kongsberg Jazz Festival

Tom Ibarra (born 3 October 1999) is a French jazz guitarist and composer.

== Biography ==
In 2013 and 2014 Ibarra won the 1st prize young talent SACEM. He played alone with his guitar and backing tracks he had composed.

In 2016 he won the Young Hope Action Jazz at the "Springboard Action Jazz" with his band. The same year he was invited on stage at the Saint Emilion Jazz Festival by Marcus Miller.

In 2017 he won the LetterOne Rising Stars Jazz Award.

In 2018 Ibarra shared the stage with Marcus Miller and his band in June at Leopolis Jazz Festival (Ukraine), then in July at Jazzopen in Stuttgart (Germany).

He has also composed pieces of music that he proposed to great international musicians, such as Gergő Borlai, Federico Malaman, Igor Falecki or Etibar Asadli.

== Honors ==
- 2016: Jeune Espoir Action Jazz lors at "Tremplin Action Jazz"
- 2017: LetterOne Rising Stars Jazz Award

== Discography ==
- 2015: 15 (Tom Ibarra)
- 2018: Sparkling (Tom Ibarra) with Michael League as guest on Sparkling, and Stéphane Guillaume as guest on Aurore.
- 2021: LUMA (Tom Ibarra)
