= Dick Maloney (singer) =

- Born: March 17, 1933; Ottawa, Ontario, Canada
- Died: August 19, 2010 (aged 77) Ottawa
- Genres: Jazz
- Occupations: Vocalist, radio host

Dick Maloney (March 17, 1933 – August 19, 2010) was a Canadian jazz singer and radio host in Ottawa, Ontario, who performed for over forty years. In recognition for his achievements, the City of Ottawa named December 10, 1994, as Dick Maloney Day. He hosted the radio program, Sentimental Journey, on Oldies 1310.

Filmography:

'Miss Cast Away And The Island Girls'
