= John Roache =

American jazz musician

John Edward Roache (July 19, 1940 – March 3, 1999) was an American pianist, and prolific MIDI sequencer, exponent, and composer of ragtime; notable for his involvement with and contribution to the international "Ragtime Ring"^{1} and eminent, affiliated Swedish Ragtime Society^{2} (which houses a number of Roache's creations and a posthumous biography pertaining to him^{3}, alongside works by a number of contemporary ragtime composers). Monument to his work in this field is his expansive MIDI library^{4}, which is maintained in his memory to the present day, and comprises – for the most part – his own output. He resided in Torrance, California and worked as a pharmacist.
