= Luigi Trussardi =

French jazz bassist

Luigi Trussardi (6 June 1938 – 29 April 2010) was a French jazz bassist.

He was born Louis Félix Angelo Trussardi in Clichy on 6 June 1938.
