= Nisse Lind =

Swedish jazz accordionist and pianist

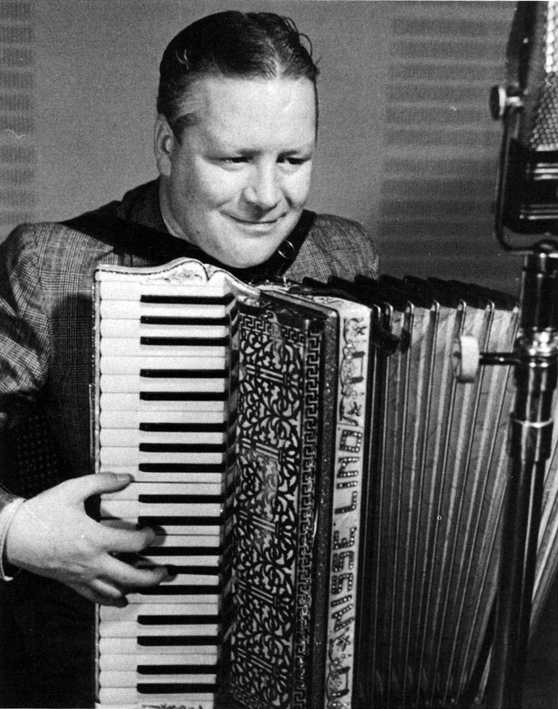
Nisse Lind

Nils Einar Lind, nicknamed "Nisse" or "Bagarn" (October 27, 1904 in Stockholm – October 25, 1941 in Stockholm) was a Swedish jazz accordionist and pianist. He recorded frequently in the 1930s and was a regular performer on radio and film soundtracks up to the time of his death.

== Filmography ==
- 1932 – Jag gifta mig – aldrig
- 1935 – Munkbrogreven
- 1936 – Alla tiders Karlsson
- 1937 – En flicka kommer till sta'n
- 1937 – Familjen Andersson
- 1940 – Kronans käcka gossar
