= Wendell Logan =

American musician (1940–2010)

Wendell Morris Logan
- Born: November 24, 1940; Thomson, Georgia
- Died: June 15, 2010 (aged 69); Cleveland, Ohio
- Occupation: Composer

Wendell Morris Logan (November 24, 1940 – June 15, 2010), was an American jazz and concert music composer who created the jazz department at the Oberlin Conservatory of Music.

== Biography ==
Wendell Logan was born in Thomson, Georgia on November 24, 1940. His first musical studies were with his father, an amateur alto saxophonist. He graduated with a bachelor's degree in music in 1962 from the historically black Florida A&M University, which he had attended on a football scholarship. At Florida A&M in 1962, Logan heard Igor Stravinsky's Firebird Suite for the first time. This initial exposure to the twelve-tone technique led Logan to undertake a path leading to a career as a composer. He earned a master's degree in music in 1964 from Southern Illinois University Carbondale and was awarded a Ph.D. in music theory and composition in 1968 from the University of Iowa.

After graduating from college, Logan served on the faculties of Ball State University, Florida A&M University and Western Illinois University, before joining the faculty of the Oberlin Conservatory of Music in 1973, where he eventually become chairman of the jazz studies department and professor of African-American music. When Logan first arrived at Oberlin, jazz was exclusively an extracurricular activity. Dr. Logan began teaching jazz music shortly after joining Oberlin, forming the Oberlin Jazz Ensemble in 1973. Logan developed a curriculum for a jazz major in 1989, and by 1991 he helped modify Oberlin's admission standards to allow students to be selected for admission to the conservatory based on their talent as jazz performers.

In addition to playing soprano saxophone and trumpet, Logan composed both jazz and concert music. Among his concert works are the 1989 "Runagate, Runagate" based on a poem by Robert Hayden about a fugitive slave and "Doxology Opera: The Doxy Canticles" in 2001 which features a libretto by Paul Carter Harrison. Logan's music has been recorded on Orion Records and other labels.

Logan believed that being described as a "black composer" was a two-edged sword. He would have preferred music by African-American composers to simply be performed alongside works by other composers. Regarding that distinction, he remarked: "No one is asking for a special day: 'Here's the day for black American composers.' That's kind of demeaning. But it's better than nothing". On his Oberlin College profile, Logan described jazz as "our classical music" and said that it "belongs here just as much as Americans belong on this soil."

He was selected for a Guggenheim Fellowship in 1991.

A resident of Oberlin, Ohio, Logan died in Cleveland at age 69 on June 15, 2010, after suffering a short illness. He was survived by his wife, the former Bettye Reese, as well as by a daughter, a son and four grandchildren.

== Selected works ==
=== Orchestral ===
- Concert Music (1963)
- Polyphony I (1968)
- Orbits, sym. band (1982)
- The Drum Major: in memoriam Dr M.L. King (1983)
- Ibo Landing (1994–5)

=== Vocal ===
- What time is it? for soprano and piano (1967)
- Songs of our Time for SATB and chamber ensemble (1969)
- 3 Fragments (K. Patchen) for soprano, clarinet, piano, percussion (1974)
- Ice and Fire (M. Evans), song cycle for soprano, baritone, and piano (1975)
- Malcolm, Malcolm for SATB and tape (1976)
- Hughes Set (L. Hughes) for TTB and percussion (1978)
- Dream Boogie for voice and piano (1979)
- Sling Along (J.W. Johnson) for baritone (1982)
- Runagate, Runagate for tenor, flute, clarinet, piano, violin, and violoncello (1990)
- Runagate, Runagate for tenor and orchestra (1993–1994)
- My Lord What a Morning for SATB (1988)
- Variations on Doo-Wah for TTBB (1988)

=== Chamber and solo instrumental ===
- Ww Qnt (1964)
- Stanza for 3 Players for flute, violoncello, and piano (1967)
- Evocation, harmonica, tape, (1973)
- Music for Brass for brass quintet (1976)
- Song of the Witchdoktor for flute, violoncello, piano, and percussion (1976)
- 3 Pieces for violin and piano (1977)
- Duo Exchanges for clarinet and percussion (1978)
- To Mingus for vibraphone (1979)
- Praeludium for wind ensemble (1983)
- 4 Miniatures for saxophone (1985)
- Children's Pieces (1989)
- Roots, Branches, Shapes and Shades (of Green) for piano and chamber orchestra (1991)
- Moments for alto flute, piccolo, clarinet and bass clarinet, piano, percussion, violin, and violoncello (1992)

=== Multimedia ===
- From Hell to Breakfast for jazz quintet, speakers, lights, tape (1973)
- Noah (A Jazz Cant.) for narrator, chorus, dancers, jazz quintet, tape (1983)
- Return of the Collard People for dancers, tape (1988)
