= 2017 in jazz =

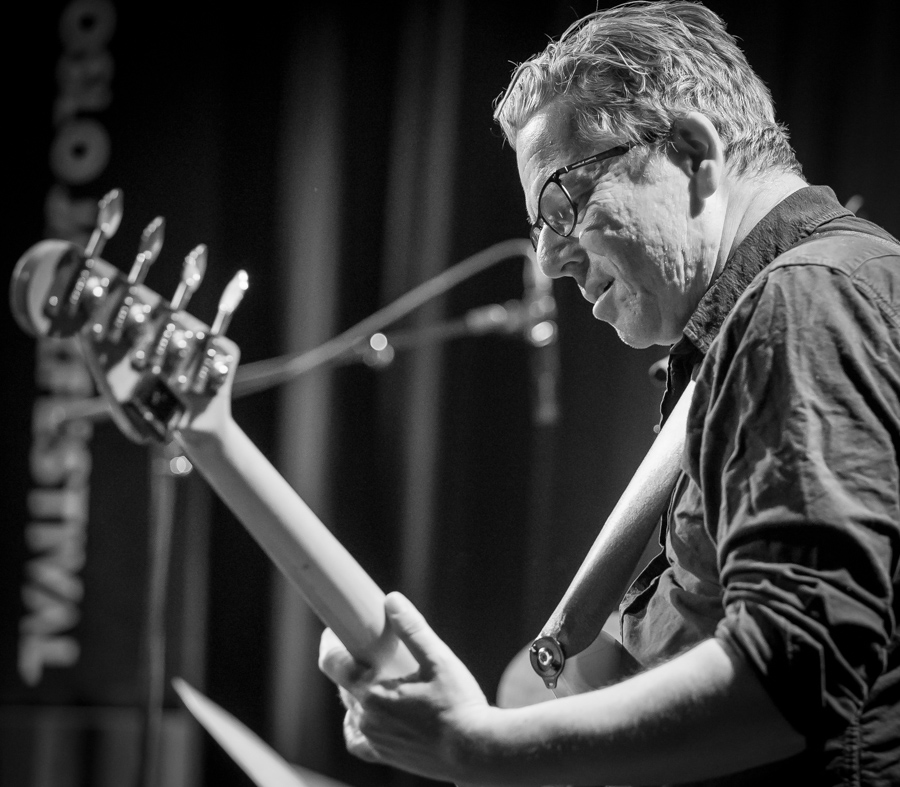
- Audun Erlien
- Decade: 2010s in jazz
- Music: 2017 in music
- Standards: List of jazz standards
- See also: 2016 in jazz – 2018 in jazz

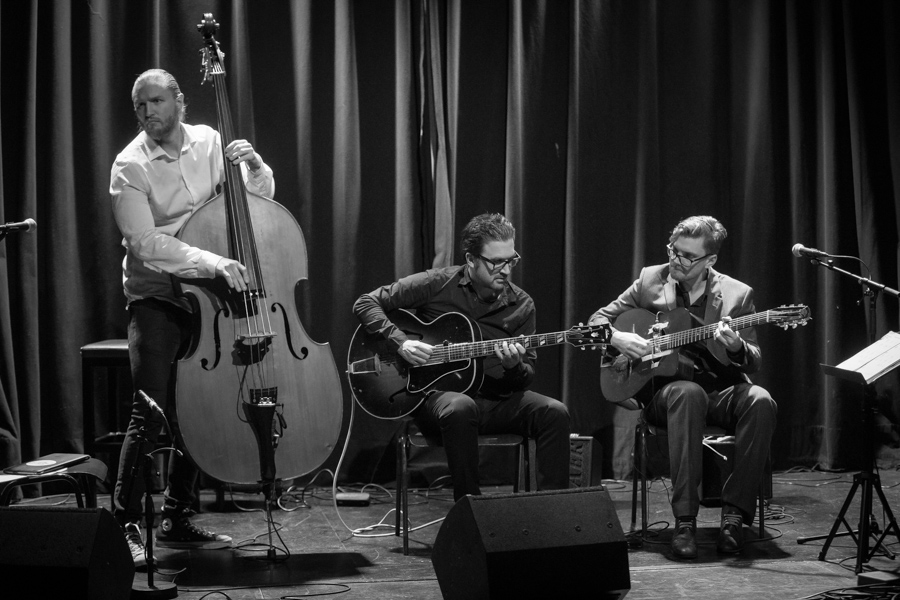
Touche during Djangofestivalen at Cosmopolite at Cosmopolite in Oslo

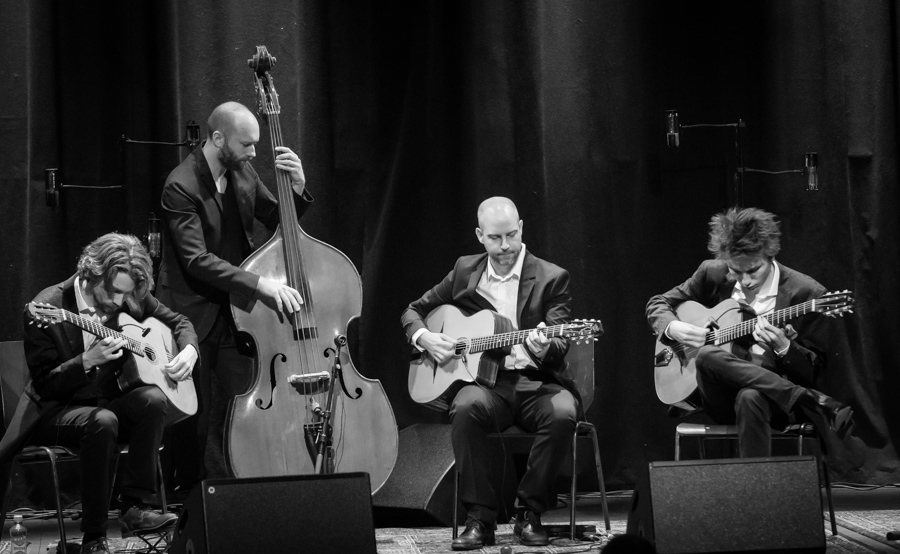
Acoustic Connection during Djangofestivalen at Cosmopolite in Oslo

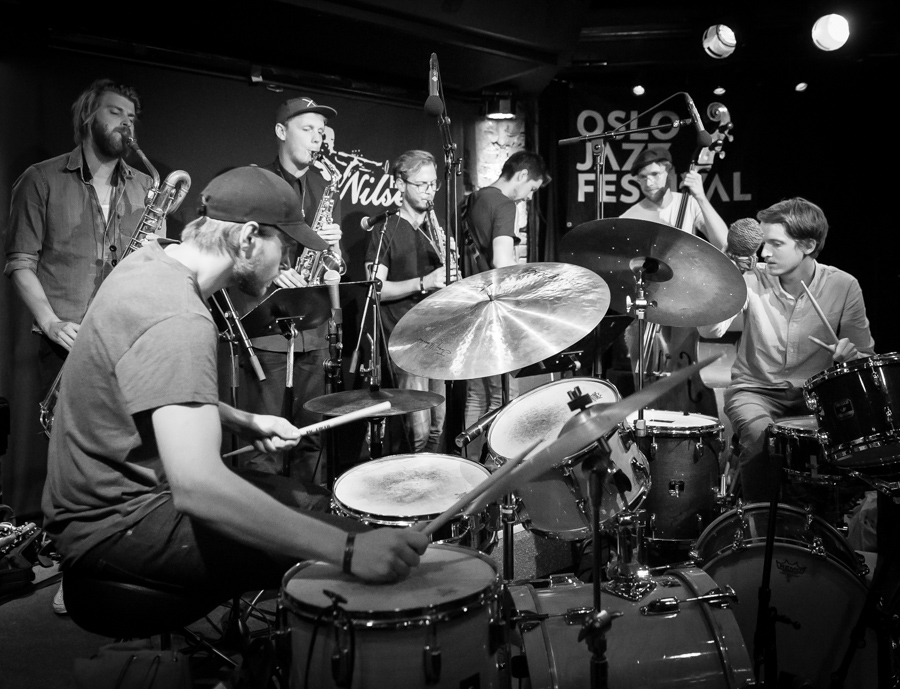
Megalodon Collective

This is a timeline documenting events of Jazz in the year 2017.

== Events ==
=== January ===
- 12
  - The 16th All Ears festival started in Oslo (January 12–15).
  - The 3rd annual Tucson Jazz Festival started in Tucson, Arizona (January 12 – 22).
- 20 – The 36th annual Djangofestival started on Cosmopolite in Oslo, Norway (January 20 – 21).
- 21 – Hot Club de Norvège headline at the annual Djangofestival at Cosmopolite in Oslo, Norway.
- 28 – Nils Petter Molvær is presented as winner of the 2016 Spellemannprisen Jazz award.

=== February ===
- 1 – The 6th Bodø Jazz Open started in Bodø, Norway (February 1 – 4).
- 2 – The 19th Polarjazz Festival started in Longyearbyen, Svalbard (February 2–5).
- 9 – The 12th Ice Music Festival started in Geilo, Norway (February 9 – 11).

=== March ===
- 3 – The 13th Jakarta International Java Jazz Festival started in Jakarta, Indonesia (March 3 – 5).
- 31 – The 18th Cape Town International Jazz Festival started in Cape Town, South Africa (March 31 – April 1).

=== April ===
- 7 – The 44th Vossajazz started in Voss, Norway (April 7 – 9).
- 30 – The International Jazz Day.

=== May ===
- 5 – The Balejazz started in Balestrand (May 5 – 7).
- 9 – The 28th MaiJazz started in Stavanger, Norway (May 9 – 14).
- 10 – The 13th AnJazz, the Hamar Jazz Festival started at Hamar, Norway (May 10 – 14).
- 11 – The 17th Festival Jazz à Saint-Germain-des-Prés started in Paris, France (May 11 – 22).
- 18 – The 6th Torino Jazz Festival started in Turin (May 18–22).
- 26 – The 45th Nattjazz started in Bergen, Norway (May 26 – June 4).

=== June ===
- 1 – Proceedings of the Echo Jazz Awards in Hamburg, Germany.
- 22 – The 27th JazzBaltica started in Schloss Salzau close to Kiel, Germany (June 22–25).
- 23 – The 7th Alfa Jazz Fest started in Lviv, Ukraine (June 23–27).
- 28 – The 28th Jazz Fest Wien started in Vienna, Austria (June 28 – July 10).
- 29
  - The 37th Montreal International Jazz Festival started in Montreal, Quebec, Canada (June 29 - July 8).
  - The 37th Jazz à Vienne started in Vienne, France (June 29 - July 13).
- 30
  - The 5th Love Supreme Festival started in Glynde Place, East Sussex (June 30 – July 2).
  - The 51st Montreux Jazz Festival started in Montreux, Switzerland (June 30 – July 15).

=== July ===
- 5 – The 53rd Kongsberg Jazzfestival started in Kongsberg, Norway (July 5 – 8).
- 6
  - The 17th Stavernfestivalen started in Stavern, Norway (July 6 – 8).
  - The 21st Skånevik Bluesfestival started in Skånevik, Norway (July 6 – 8).
- 7
  - The 39th Copenhagen Jazz Festival started in Copenhagen, Denmark (July 7 – 16).
  - The 44th Umbria Jazz Festival started in Perugia, Italy (July 7 – 16).
  - The 42nd North Sea Jazz Festival started in The Hague, Netherlands (July 7–9).
- 8 – The 52nd Pori Jazz Festival started in Pori, Finland (July 8 – 16).
- 11 – The 41st Jazz de Vitoria started in Gasteiz, Spain (July 11 – 15).
- 15 – The 29th Aarhus Jazz Festival started in Aarhus, Denmark (July 15 – 22).
- 17
  - The 70th Nice Jazz Festival started in Nice, France (July 17 – 21).
  - The 56th Moldejazz started in Molde, Norway (July 17 – 22).
- 26 – The 22nd Canal Street started in Arendal, Norway (July 26 – 29).
- 28 – The 40th Jazz in Marciac started in Marciac, France (July 28 – August 14).

=== August ===
- 4 – The 61st Newport Jazz Festival started in Newport, Rhode Island (August 4 – 6).
- 8 – The 18th Øyafestivalen started in Oslo, Norway (August 8 – 12).
- 10
  - The Nišville International Jazz Festival started in Niš, Serbia (August 10–13).
  - The 31st Sildajazz started in Haugesund, Norway (August 10 – 14).
- 11 – The 33rd Brecon Jazz Festival started in Brecon, Wales (August 11 – 13).
- 12 – The 32nd Oslo Jazzfestival started in Oslo, Norway (August 12 – 19).
- 31 – The 12th Punktfestivalen started in Kristiansand, Norway (August 31 - September 2).

=== September ===
- 1 – The 16th Tokyo Jazz Festival, started at North Door in Tokyo, Japan (September 1 – 3).
- 14 – The 4th Everfest, Sonic Transmissions started at North Door in Austin, Texas (September 14 – 16).
- 15 – The 60th Monterey Jazz Festival started in Monterey, California (September 15 – 17).

=== October ===
- 6 – The 34th Stockholm Jazz Festival started in Stockholm, Sweden (October 6 – 15).
- 19 – The 34th DølaJazz started in Lillehammer, Norway (October 19 – 22).
- 25 – The 49th Umeå Jazz Festival started in Umeå, Sweden (October 25 – 29).
- 27 – The 38th Cork Jazz Festival started in Cork, Ireland (October 27 – 30).

=== November ===
- 2 – The 53rd Jazz Fest Berlin started in Berlin, Germany (November 2 – 5).
- 10 – The 25th London Jazz Festival started in London, England (November 10 – 19).
- 23 – The São Paulo Jazz Festival started in São Paulo, Brazil (November 23 – 26).

=== December ===
- 28 – The 25th Umbria Jazz Winter started in Orvieto, Italy (December 28 – January 1).

== Albums released ==
Month	Day	Album	Artist	Label	Notes	Ref.
January	6	Pentagon Tapes	Dag Arnesen Trio	Losen		
January	13	Hà Nội Duo	Nguyên Lê featuring Paolo Fresu	ACT	Executive producer Siggi Loch	
January	13	Danse	Colin Vallon Trio	ECM	Produced by Manfred Eicher	
January	13	Up and Coming	John Abercrombie Quartet (Marc Copland, Drew Gress, Joey Baron)	ECM	Produced by Manfred Eicher	
January	13	The Invariant	Benedikt Jahnel Trio (Antonio Miguel, Owen Howard)	ECM	Produced by Manfred Eicher	
January	13	Politur Passiarer	Scheen Jazzorkester & Audun Kleive	Losen		
January	20	Chromola	1982 (Nils Økland, Sigbjørn Apeland, Øyvind Skarbø)	Heilo		
January	20	Vit	Christer Fredriksen	Losen	Produced by Christer Fredriksen	
January	27	Elegy	Theo Bleckmann with Ben Monder, Shai Maestro, Chris Tordini, John Hollenbeck	ECM	Produced by Manfred Eicher	
January	27	Godspeed	Morten Schantz	Edition	Produced by Morten Schantz with Kristian Thomsen	
January	27	Meet Me At The Movies	Viktoria Tolstoy	ACT	Produced by Nils Landgren executive producer Siggi Loch	
January	27	Piano Song	Matthew Shipp Trio	Thirsty Ear	Produced by Peter Gordon	
January	27	Potsdamer Platz	Jan Lundgren	ACT	Produced by Siggi Loch	
January	27	Quiet Dreams	Hilde Hefte	Ponca Jazz		
February	3	Daylight Ghosts	Craig Taborn	ECM	Produced by Manfred Eicher	
February	3	Ut Og Se Noe Annet	Marthe Wang	Kirkelig Kulturverksted	Produced by Markus Lillehaug Johnsen. Nominated for the folk Spellemannprisen	
February	3	My Foolish Heart	Ralph Towner	ECM	Produced by Manfred Eicher	
February	10	La Diversité	Nicolas Kummert	Edition		
February	10	Third Set	Oleta Adams			
February	17	Axis	Irabagon, Hegre & Drønen	Rune Grammofon		
February	24	Drunk	Thundercat	Brainfeeder	Produced by Flying Lotus, Mono/Poly, Sounwave, Thundercat	
February	24	Potsdamer Platz	Jan Lundgren	ACT	Produced by Siggi Loch	
February	24	The Roc	Daniel Herskedal	Edition	Produced by Daniel Herskedal	
February	24	Sooner And Later	Julia Hülsmann Trio	ECM	Produced by Manfred Eicher	
March	3	Rímur	Trio Mediaeval / Arve Henriksen	ECM	Produced by Manfred Eicher	
March	7	Animals	Megalodon Collective	Jazzland		
March	17	Asian Field Variations	Louis Sclavis, Dominique Pifarely, Vincent Courtois	ECM	Produced by Manfred Eicher	
March	17	Metrics	Stephan Meidell	Hubro		
March	24	Dance of Time	Eliane Elias	Concord	Produced by Eliane Elias, Marc Johnson, Steve Rodby	
March	24	Preverbal	Matthew Stevens	Ropeadope		
March	24	Vessel in Orbit	Whit Dickey, Mat Maneri, and Matthew Shipp	AUM Fidelity	Produced by Whit Dickey	
March	31	December Avenue	Tomasz Stanko New York Quartet	ECM	Produced by Manfred Eicher	
March	31	Skinner Plays Skinner	David Arthur Skinner	Losen	Produced by David Arthur Skinner	
April	7	Charlie Watts Meets The Danish Radio Big Band	Charlie Watts	Impulse!		
April	7	East West Time Line	Kevin Eubanks	Mack Avenue	Produced by Kevin Eubanks	
April	7	Gratitude	Dayna Stephens	Contagious Music	Produced by Matt Pierson	
April	7	Nattsongar	Erlend Apneseth / Ole Morten Vågan / Hans Hulbækmo	Hubro	Produced by Andreas R Meland and Erlend Apneseth	
April	7	Nuit Blanche	François Couturier, Tarkovsky Quartet	ECM	Produced by Manfred Eicher	
April	7	Thunder of the Gods	Sun Ra and His Arkestra	Modern Harmonic		
April	7	Silent Light	Dominic Miller	ECM	Produced by Manfred Eicher	
April	14	Walk Against Wind	Linda May Han Oh	Biophilia		
April	21	The Dreamer Is The Dream	Chris Potter, David Virelles, Joe Martin, and Marcus Gilmore	ECM	Produced by Manfred Eicher	
April	21	Find The Way	Aaron Parks, Ben Street, and Billy Hart	ECM		
April	21	Guzuguzu	Helge Lien Trio	Ozella	Nominated for the jazz Spellemannprisen	
April	21	Sabiduría	Eddie Palmieri	Ropeadope		
April	21	Titok	Ferenc Snétberger, Anders Jormin, and Joey Baron	ECM	Produced by Manfred Eicher	
April	22	Death to the Planet	The Comet Is Coming	The Leaf Label	Produced by Dan Leavers	
April	28	Flowers: Beautiful Life, Volume 2	Jimmy Greene	Mack Avenue	Produced by Jimmy Greene, executive producer Gretchen Valade	
April	28	Nightfall	Quercus (June Tabor, Iain Ballamy, Huw Warren)	ECM	Produced by Huw Warren, Iain Ballamy	
May	5	Cross My Palm With Silver	Avishai Cohen Quartet	ECM	Produced by Manfred Eicher	
May	5	Fly Or Die	Jaimie Branch	International Anthem Recording Co.		
May	5	Kingdom	Alexi Tuomarila, Mats Eilertsen, and Olavi Louhivuori	Edition	Produced by Alexi Tuomarila, executive producer Dave Stapleton	
May	5	Towards Language	Arve Henriksen	Rune Grammofon	Produced by Jan Bang, co-produced by Arve Henriksen	
May	5	Turn Up the Quiet	Diana Krall	Verve	Produced by Tommy LiPuma	
May	12	La Saboteuse	Yazz Ahmed	Naim Audio	Produced by Noel Jangley and Yazz Ahmed	
May	17	She Moves On	Youn Sun Nah	ACT	Produced by Jamie Saft	
May	19	Music From Our Soul	Charnett Moffett	Motema		
May	26	Dizzy	Jukka Perko Tritone	We Jazz Records		
May	26	Loneliness Road	Jamie Saft, Steve Swallow, Bobby Previte, with Iggy Pop	RareNoise Records	Produced by Christian Castagno, Jamie Saft	
May	26	Planetary Prince	Cameron Graves	Mack Avenue	Produced by Cameron Graves	
May	26	Serenade for Horace	Louis Hayes	Blue Note	Produced by Dezron Douglas, Don Was	
May	26	Small Town	Bill Frisell and Thomas Morgan	ECM	Produced by Manfred Eicher	
May	31	Ruler Rebel	Christian Scott aTunde Adjuah	Ropeadope	Produced by Chris Dunn	
June	16	Bells for the South Side	Roscoe Mitchell	ECM		
June	16	The Late Trane	Denys Baptiste	Edition	Produced by Jason Yarde	
June	16	A Piece Of The Apple	Frode Kjekstad	Losen	Produced by Frode Kjekstad	
June	23	Diaspora	Christian Scott	Ropeadope		
June	23	Interactions	Kåre Kolve	Curling Legs	Commission for Vossajazz	
June	30	Unbreakable	Nils Landgren Funk Unit featuring Ray Parker Jr.	ACT	Produced by Magnum Coltrane Price and Nils Landgren, executive producer Siggi Loch	
July	7	Saluting Sgt. Pepper	Django Bates	Edition	Produced by Django Bates and Tim Adnitt	
July	14	Passin’ Thru	Charles Lloyd New Quartet	Blue Note		
July	28	Sinatra & Jobim @ 50	John Pizzarelli	Concord Jazz	Featuring Daniel Jobim	
August	18	Rathkes Gate 12:21:58	Bendik Hofseth / Jacob Young / Paolo Vinaccia	Oslo Session Recordings		
August	18	Aqustico Vol 2	Luca Aquino	Losen	Produced by RVB – AeA societa cooperativa	
August	18	Utopian Tales	Stein Urheim	Hubro	Produced by Jørgen Træen and Stein Urheim	
August	25	Far from Over	Vijay Iyer Sextet	ECM		
August	25	Incidentals	Tim Berne's Snakeoil	ECM	Produced by David Torn	
August	25	Tangents	Gary Peacock Trio including with Marc Copland and Joey Baron	ECM	Produced by Manfred Eicher	
August	25	Brothers	Adam Baldych and Helge Lien Trio featuring Tore Brunborg	ACT	Produced by Siggi Loch with the artist	
August	25	Kind Of Spain	Wolfgang Haffner	ACT	Produced by Lars Danielsson with Wolfgang Haffner, executive producer & curator Siggi LochSiggi Loch with the artist	
August	25	Stockholm Underground	Magnus Lindgren	ACT	Produced by Nils Landgren and Siggi Loch	
September	1	5	Eple Trio	Shipwreckords		
September	1	Blank Out	Ellen Andrea Wang	Jazzland	Nominated for the jazz Spellemannprisen	
September	1	Carla. The Fish	Espen Rud	Curling Legs		
September	4	Some Place Called Where	Marilena Paradisi and Kirk Lightsey	Losen	Produced by Marilena Paradisi	
September	8	Clocks	Erland Dahlen	Hubro	Produced by Erland Dahlen	
September	8	Trip	Mike Stern	Heads Up		
September	15	Åra	Erlend Apneseth Trio	Hubro	Produced by Andreas R Meland and Erlend Apneseth Trio. Nominated for the open class Spellemannprisen	
September	15	Gnosis	David Virelles	ECM	Produced by Manfred Eicher	
September	15	Provenance	Björn Meyer	ECM	Produced by Manfred Eicher	
September	22	Bringin' It	Christian McBride Big Band	Mack Avenue	Produced by Christian McBride	
September	22	Old Songs	Olga Konkova and Jens Thoresen	Losen	Produced by Olga Konkova and Jens Thoresen	
September	25	Vi Är Ledsna Men Du Får Inte Längre Vara Barn	Hegge	Particular Recordings	Recipient of the jazz Spellemannprisen	
September	29	Dreams and Daggers	Cécile McLorin Salvant	Mack Avenue	Produced by Al Pryor Awarded Grammy Award for Best Jazz Vocal Album at the 60th Annual Grammy Awards	
September	29	Circle Of Chimes	Marius Neset	ACT	Produced by Marius Neset, co-produced by Anton Eger. Nominated for the jazz Spellemannprisen	
September	29	Everybody Loves Angels	Bugge Wesseltoft	ACT	Produced by Siggi Loch with the artist	
September	29	A Meeting of Spirits	Gary Husband	Edition		
September	29	Pastor´n	Asmundsen & Co	Losen	Produced by Tine Asmundsen and Vidar Johansen. All compositions by Einar “Pastor´n” Iversen.	
October	6	Bandes Originales	Vincent Courtois, Daniel Erdmann, Robin Fincker	La Buissonne	Produced by 22D Music, RJAL for La Buissonne	
October	6	Freedom Nation	Natalie Sandtorv	Øra Fonogram	Commission for Moldejazz	
October	6	Setembro	Mário Laginha, Julian Argüelles, and Helge Andreas Norbakken	Edition	Executive producer Dave Stapleton	
October	13	Blue Maqams	Anouar Brahem (Dave Holland, Jack DeJohnette, Django Bates)	ECM	Produced by Manfred Eicher	
October	13	Flyge Fra	Frida Ånnevik	Grappa Music	Recipient of the folk Spellemannprisen	
October	20	The Emancipation Procrastination	Chief Xian aTunde Adjuah	Ropeadope		
October	22	Kornstad + KORK Live	Kornstad Ensemble & Norwegian Radio Orchestra	Grappa Music	Produced by Geoff Miles and Håkon Kornstad	
October	27	Autumn Wind	Scott DuBois	ACT	Produced by Scott DuBoi	
October	27	Good Stuff	Iiro Rantala & Ulf Wakenius	ACT	Produced by Siggi Loch	
October	27	Not Nearly Enough To Buy A House	Kjetil Mulelid Trio	Rune Grammofon		
November	3	Mediterraneo: Jazz at Berlin Phil VIII	Stefano Bollani Trio	ACT	ACT98492	
November	3	Comment C'est	Michael Mantler	ECM	Produced by Manfred Eicher	
November	3	Nahnou Houm	Jon Balke, Siwan	ECM	Produced by Manfred Eicher	
November	3	The Study Of Touch	Django Bates' Belovèd	ECM	Produced by Manfred Eicher	
November	3	Unloved	Maciej Obara Quartet (Dominik Wania, Ole Morten Vågan, Gard Nilssen)	ECM	Produced by Manfred Eicher	
November	10	Jazzkammer	Helge Iberg	Odin	ODINCD9563	
November	17	Music Without Borders	Annbjørg Lien	Heilo	HCD7324	
November	17	Louder Than You	Molecules & Erlend Skomsvoll	Øra Fonogram	OF121	
November	17	Sundown	Kristoffer Kompen	Kompis Records	KRE111	
November	17	Worst Generation	Nakama	Nakama Records	NKM013CD	
November	24	Plastic Sun (Remastered)	Svein Finnerud Trio	Odin	Originally released in 1970. ODINCD9558	
November	24	Space In Between	Vigleik Storaas/Tor Yttredal	Inner Ear	INEA24	
November	24	Steamdome	Ola Kvernberg	Grappa	Nominated for the open class Spellemannprisen	
November	24	You I Me	Kim Myhr	Hubro	HUBROLP3593	
December	1	Kroks Bok	Bjørn Krokfoss	Hot Club Records	HCRBOK556	
December	1	Orchestral Works	Hans Mathisen	Curling Legs	CLPCD161	
December	1	Meander	Jo David Meyer Lysne & Mats Eilertsen	Øra Fonogram	OF128	

== Deaths ==
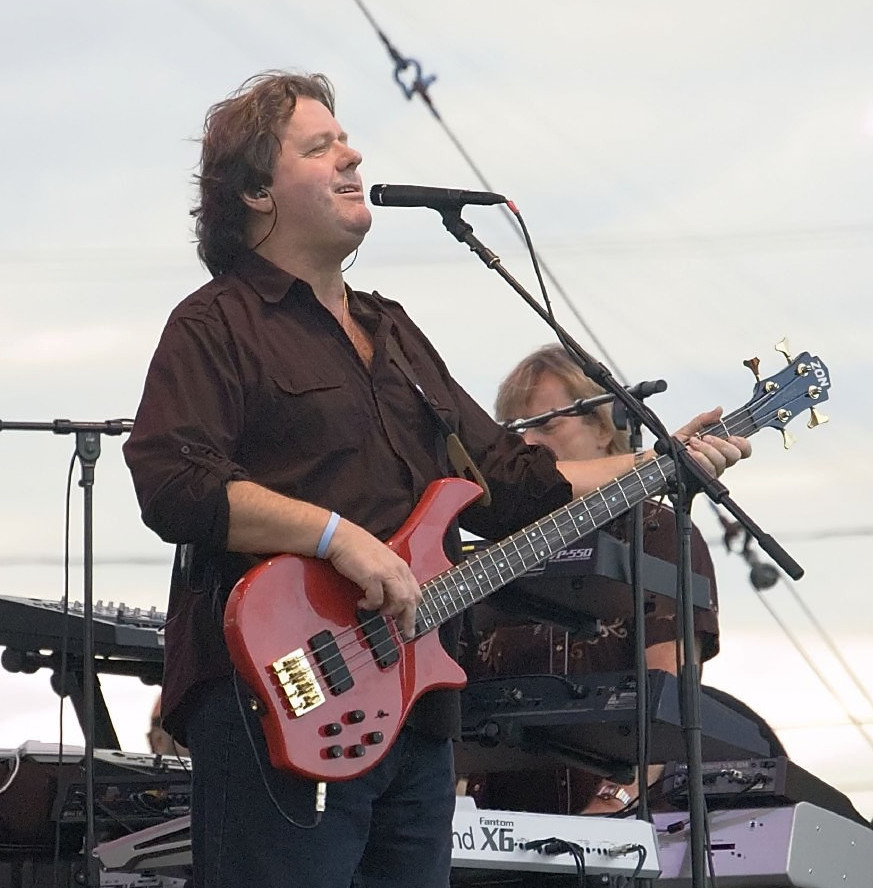
John Wetton

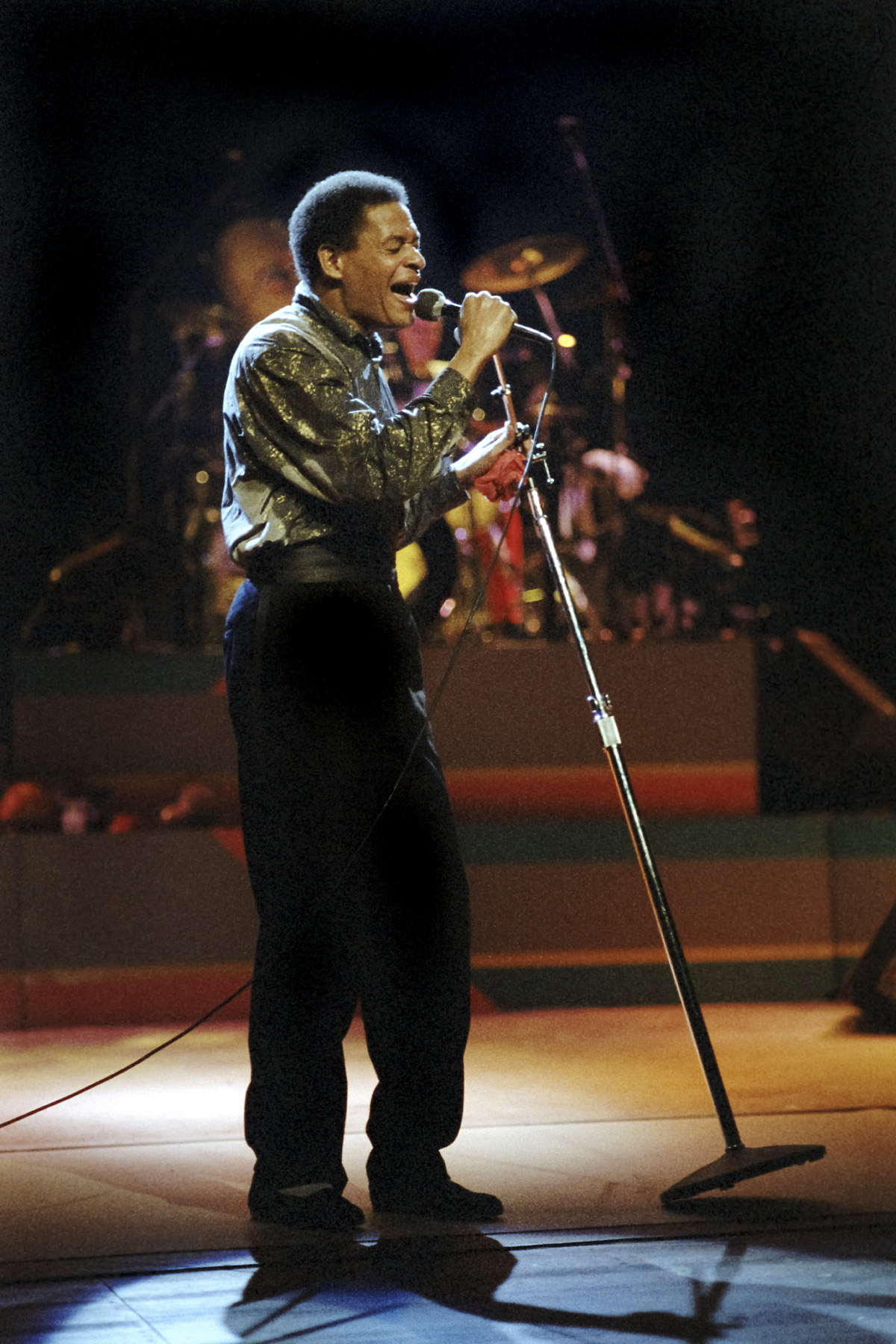
Al Jarreau Berlin 1986.

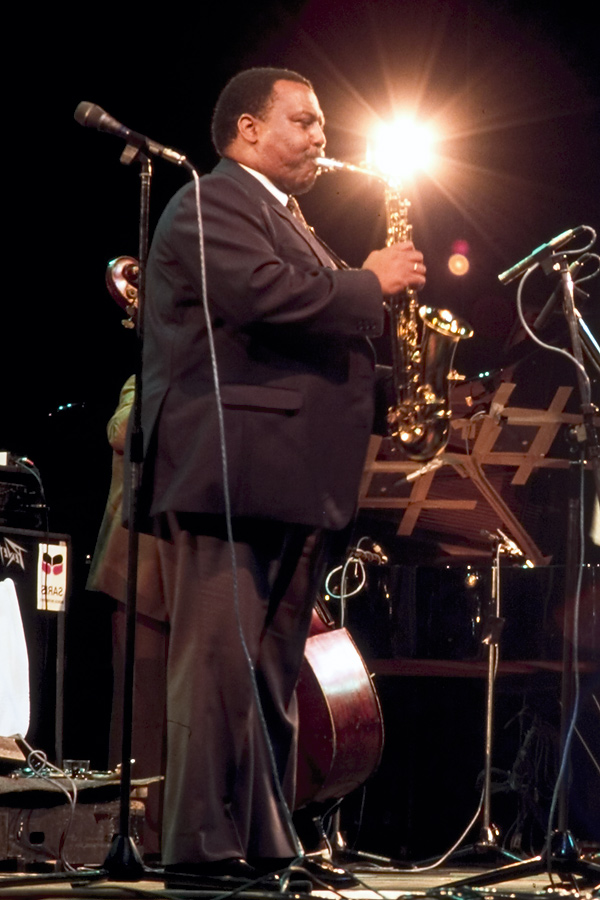
Arthur Blythe in 1989.

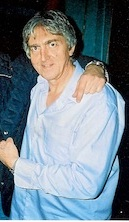
Allan Holdsworth

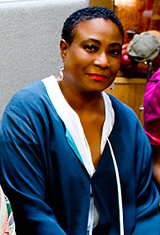
Geri Allen

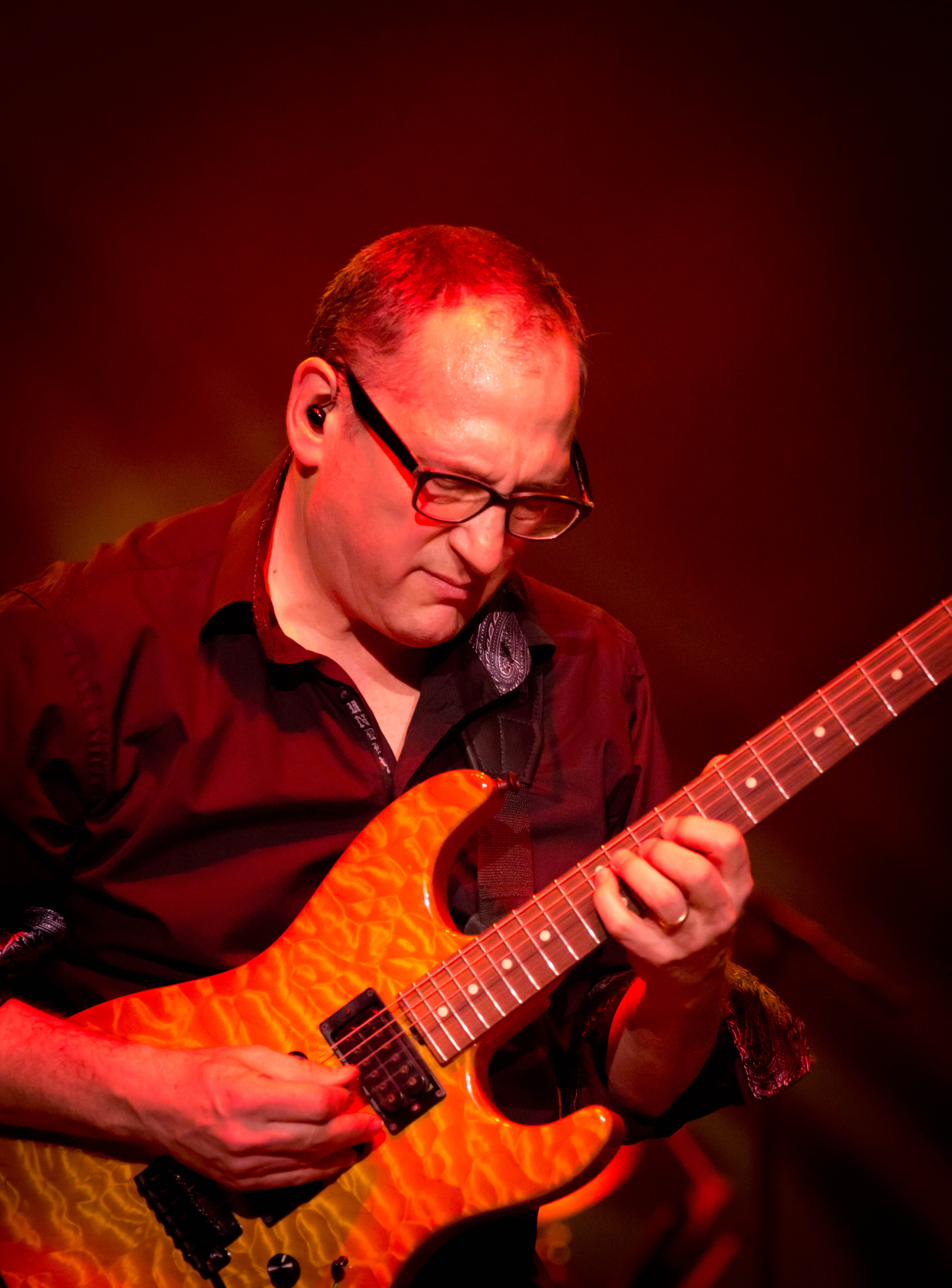
Chuck Loeb

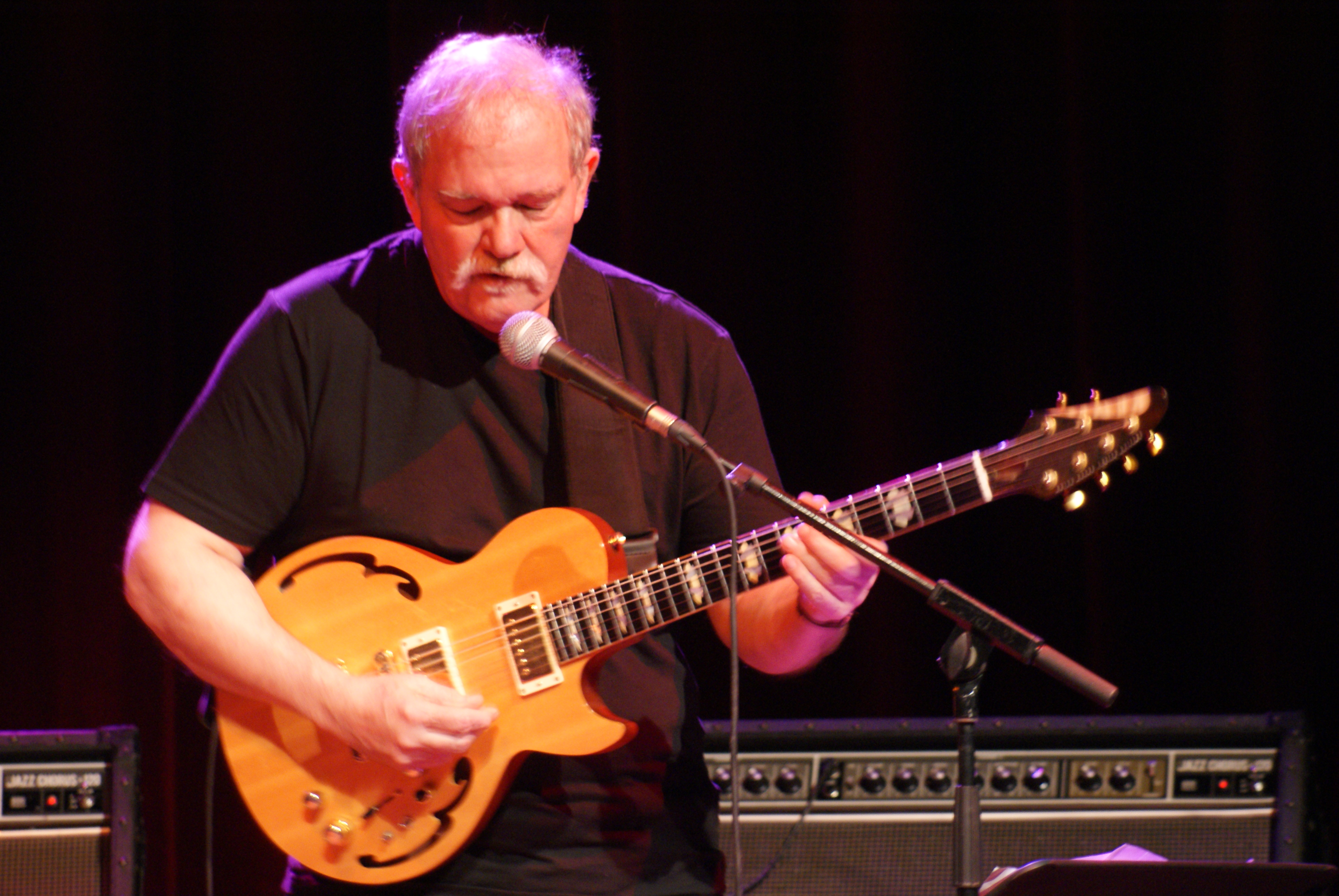
John Abercrombie

=== January ===
- 8
  - Buddy Bregman, American arranger, producer, and composer (born 1930).
  - Rod Mason, British trumpeter (born 1940).
- 10 – Buddy Greco, American singer and pianist (born 1926).
- 14 – John Boudreaux, American drummer (born 1936).
- 15
  - Terry Cryer, British jazz and blues photographer (born 1934).
  - Thandi Klaasen, South African singer (pancreatic cancer) (born 1931).
- 16 – Charles "Bobo" Shaw, American drummer (born 1947).
- 20 – Chuck Stewart, American photographer (born 1927).
- 22 – Jaki Liebezeit, German drummer (died 1939).
- 28 – Guitar Gable, American singer, guitarist, and songwriter (born 1937).
- 31 – John Wetton, English singer, bassist, and songwriter (cancer) (born 1949).

=== February ===
- 5 – David Axelrod, American musician and producer (born 1931).
- 7 – Svend Asmussen, Danish violinist, known as "The Fiddling Viking" (born 1916).
- 12
  - Al Jarreau, American singer (born 1940).
  - Barbara Carroll, American pianist and singer (born 1925).
- 18 – Clyde Stubblefield, American drummer best known for his work with James Brown (kidney failure) (born 1943).
- 19 – Larry Coryell, American guitarist (born 1943).
- 20 – Nicolai Munch-Hansen, Danish bassist and composer (born 1977).
- 23 – Horace Parlan, American pianist (born 1931).
- 24 – Fumio Karashima, Japanese pianist (born 1948).

=== March ===
- 3 – Misha Mengelberg, Dutch pianist and composer (born 1935).
- 8 – Dave Valentin, American flautist (born 1952).
- 13 – Tommy LiPuma, American music producer (born 1936).
- 16 – James Cotton, American blues harmonica player, singer and songwriter (born 1935).
- 18 – Chuck Berry, American guitarist, singer and songwriter (born 1926).
- 20
  - Buck Hill, American saxophonist (born 1927).
  - Tony Terran, American trumpeter and session musician (born 1926).
- 21 – Roy Fisher, British poet and pianist (born 1930).
- 24 – Avo Uvezian, Armenian-American pianist, composer, and cigar manufacturer (born 1926).
- 26 – Jimmy Dotson, American singer, guitarist, and drummer (born 1933).
- 27
  - Arthur Blythe, American alto saxophonist and composer (died 1940).
  - Clem Curtis, Trinidadian British singer in The Foundations (born 1940).

=== April ===
- 1
  - Bob Cunningham, American bassist (born 1934).
  - Lonnie Brooks, American blues singer and guitarist (born 1933).
- 9
  - Knut Borge, Norwegian journalist, entertainer, and jazz enthusiast (born 1949).
  - Stan Robinson, English tenor saxophonist (born 1936).
- 11
  - J. Geils, American jazz and blues guitarist in The J. Geils Band (born 1946).
  - Toby Smith, British keyboardist and songwriter for Jamiroquai (born 1970).
- 15 – Allan Holdsworth, British jazz fusion guitarist in Gong, Soft Machine (born 1946).
- 27 – John Shifflett, American bassist (born 1953).
- 29 – Ian Cruickshank, English guitarist, educator, author and columnist (born 1947).

=== May ===
- 1 – Bruce Hampton, American singer and guitarist, Hampton Grease Band (born 1947).
- 3 – Casey Jones, American drummer, singer, and record producer (born 1940).
- 7 – Dave Pell, American jazz saxophonist and bandleader (born 1925).
- 12 – Bill Dowdy, American drummer in The Three Sounds (born 1932).
- 14 – Tom McClung, American pianist and composer (born 1957).
- 22 – Mickey Roker, American drummer (born 1932).
- 27 – Gregg Allman, American singer, guitarist, pianist, and songwriter, the Allman Brothers Band (born 1947).
- 31 – Bern Nix, American guitarist (born 1947).

=== June ===
- 17 – Thara Memory, American trumpeter (born 1948).
- 18 – Chris Murrell, American singer (born 1956).
- 22 – Jimmy Nalls, American guitarist and singer, Sea Level (born 1951).
- 27 – Geri Allen, American pianist (born 1957).
- 28 – Phil Cohran, American trumpeter (born 1927).

=== July ===
- 4 – John Blackwell American drummer, Prince (born 1973).
- 7 – Egil Monn-Iversen, Norwegian composer and pianist (born 1928).
- 12 – Ray Phiri, South African jazz fusion singer and guitarist (born 1947).
- 13 – Egil Kapstad, Norwegian pianist and composer (born 1940).
- 19 – Graham Wood, Australian pianist (born 1971).
- 21 – Errol Dyers, South African guitarist (born 1952).
- 26 – Tom McIntosh, American trombonist and composer (born 1927).
- 30 – Charlie Tagawa, Japanese-American musical entertainer and banjoist (born 1935).
- 31 – Chuck Loeb, American guitarist and composer (born 1955).

=== August ===
- 4 – Bruno Canfora, Italian composer, conductor, and music arranger (born 1924).
- 7 – Janet Seidel, Australian singer and pianist (born 1955).
- 16 – Mike Hennessey, English music journalist and pianist (born 1928).
- 19 – Bea Wain, American Big Band-era singer (born 1917).
- 22 – John Abercrombie, American guitarist, composer and bandleader (born 1944).
- 26 – Wilson das Neves, Brazilian bossa nova singer and percussionist (born 1936).
- 29 – Larry Elgart, American jazz bandleader (born 1922).
- 30 – Skip Prokop, Canadian rock and jazz fusion drummer in Lighthouse, The Paupers (born 1943).
- 31 – Janne Carlsson, Swedish drummer and actor (born 1937).

=== September ===
- 3 – Walter Becker, American guitarist in Steely Dan, songwriter, and record producer (born 1950).
- 5 – Leo Cuypers, Dutch pianist and composer (born 1947).
- 11 – Frank Capp, American drummer (born 1931).
- 17 – Laudir de Oliveira, Brazilian rock and jazz percussionist in Chicago (born 1940).
- 22 – Mike Carr, English organist, pianist and vibraphonist (born 1937).
- 27 – CeDell Davis, American guitarist and singer (born 1926).

=== October ===
- 6 – Lou Gare, English saxophonist (born 1939).
- 8 – Grady Tate, American drummer and singer (born 1932).
- 12 – Andy McGhee, American tenor saxophonist and educator (born 1927).
- 18 – Phil Miller, English guitarist (born 1949).
- 20 – Boris Lindqvist, Swedish singer and musician (born 1940).
- 22 – Atle Hammer, Norwegian trumpeter (born 1932).
- 24 – Fats Domino, American pianist and singer-songwriter of French Creole descent (born 1928).
- 27 – Dick Noel, American singer (born 1927).
- 29
  - Frank Holder, Guyanese singer and percussionist (born 1925).
  - Muhal Richard Abrams, American clarinetist, cellist, and jazz pianist (born 1930).
- 30 – Theo Bophela, South African band leader, composer, pianist, arranger, and music educator (born 1931).

=== November ===
- 7 – Wendell Eugene, American trombonist (born 1923).
- 18 – Ben Riley, American drummer known for playing with Thelonious Monk (born 1933).
- 19 – Della Reese, American singer (born 1931).
- 23
  - John Coates Jr., American pianist (born 1938).
  - Jon Hendricks, American singer (born 1921).
- 27 – Robert Popwell, American bass guitarist, The Young Rascals and The Crusaders (born 1950).
- 29 – Robert Walker, American guitarist (born 1937).

=== December ===
- 2 – Mundell Lowe, American guitarist (born 1922).
- 7 – Sunny Murray, American drummer (born 1936).
- 13 – Willie Pickens, American pianist (born 1931).
- 15 – John Critchinson, English pianist (born 1934).
- 16
  - Keely Smith, American singer (born 1928).
  - Ralph Carney, American saxophonist and clarinetist, Tin Huey (born 1956).
- 17 – Kevin Mahogany, American vocalist (born 1958).
- 19 – Leo Welch, American guitarist, singer, and songwriter (born 1932).
- 21
  - Dominic Frontiere, American composer, arranger, and accordionist (born 1931).
  - Halvard Kausland, Norwegian guitarist (born 1945).
  - Roswell Rudd, American trombonist (born 1935).
- 28 – Melton Mustafa, American trumpeter and flugelhornist, Count Basie Orchestra (born 1947).

== See also ==
- List of 2017 albums
- List of jazz festivals
- List of years in jazz
- 2010s in jazz
- 2017 in music
