= 1934 in jazz =

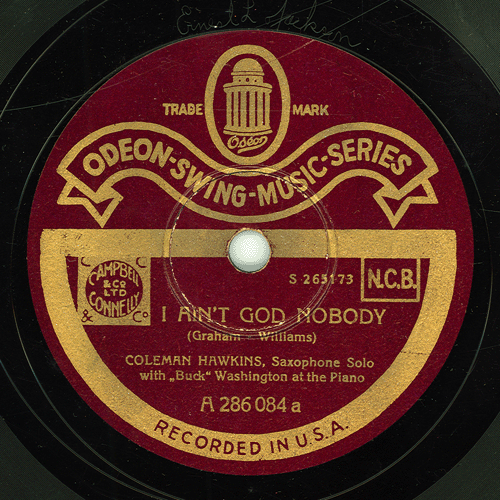
- "I Ain't Got Nobody" – Coleman Hawkins & Buck Washington, March 8, 1934
- Decade: 1930s in jazz
- Music: 1934 in music
- Standards: List of 1930s jazz standards
- See also: 1933 in jazz – 1935 in jazz

This is a timeline documenting events of Jazz in the year 1934.

== Events ==
- Louis Armstrong is in Europe, recording with French Polydor.
- Trumpeter Rex Stewart joins the Duke Ellington Band.

== Deaths ==
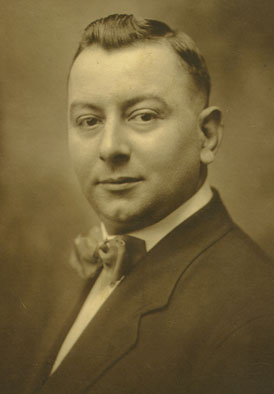
Alcide Nunez, 1918

February

- 27 – Gene Rodemich, pianist and orchestra leader (born 1890).

September

- 2
  - Alcide Nunez, United States jazz clarinetist (born 1884).
  - Russ Columbo, American singer, violinist and actor, most famous for his signature tune, "You Call It Madness, But I Call It Love" (born 1908).

Unknown date

- Eddie Anthony, American country blues and jazz musician. He played the violin (born 1890).
- Jack Carey, trombonist, the leader of the Crescent City Orchestra (born 1889).

== Births ==
January

- 5 – Phil Ramone, South African-American record producer, violinist, and composer (died 2013).
- 8 – Georg Riedel, Swedish upright bassist.
- 10
  - Joe Licari, American clarinetist.
  - Sheila Tracy, British broadcaster, writer, trombonist, and singer (died 2014).
- 11 – Egil "Bop" Johansen, Norwegian-Swedish drummer (died 1998).
- 17 – Cedar Walton, American pianist (died 2013).
- 21 – Eva Olmerová, Czech singer (died 1993).

February

- 4 – Wade Legge, American pianist and bassist (died 1963).
- 7 – King Curtis, American saxophonist (died 1971).
- 8 – Art Porter Sr., American pianist (died 1993).
- 14 – Merl Saunders, American multi-genre musician who played piano and keyboards (died 2008).
- 17 – Hacke Björksten, Finnish-Swedish bandleader and saxophonist (died 2020).
- 20 – Selçuk Sun, Turkish upright bassist and composer (died 2016).
- 23 – Inger Berggren, Swedish singer (died 2019).
- 28 – Willie Bobo, American percussionist (died 1983).

March

- 2 – Doug Watkins, American upright bassist (died 1962).
- 14 – Shirley Scott, American organist (died 2002).
- 26 – Don Bailey, American drummer (died 2013).
- 30 – Lanny Morgan, American alto saxophonist.

April

- 5 – Stanley Turrentine, American tenor saxophonist (died 2000).
- 6 – Horace Tapscott, American pianist and composer (died 1999).
- 7 – Victor Feldman, British pianist (died 1987).
- 8 – Bảo Vàng, Vietnamese trumpeter and composer (died 2016).
- 13 – Kirk Stuart, American pianist (died 1982).
- 17 – Warren Chiasson, Canadian vibraphonist.
- 29 – Norman Edge, American upright bassist (died 2018).

May

- 1 – Shirley Horn, American singer and pianist (died 2005).
- 14 – Warren Smith, American percussionist.
- 17 – John Picard, English trombonist.
- 19 – Bobby Bryant, American trumpeter and flugelhornist (died 1998).
- 21 – Bob Northern, American French hornist (died 2020).

June

- 3 – Bob Wallis, British musician (died 1991).
- 6 – Raymond Premru, American trombonist (died 1998).
- 22 – Ray Mantilla, American drummer (died 2020).
- 24 – Terry Cryer, British jazz and blues photographer (died 2017).
- 26 – Dave Grusin, American composer, arranger, and pianist.

July

- 9 – Vinko Globokar, Slovene-French avant-garde composer and trombonist.
- 9 – Colin Bailey, British-American drummer (died 2021).
- 19 – Bobby Bradford, American trumpeter and cornetist.
- 22 – Junior Cook, American tenor saxophonist (died 1992).
- 23
  - Steve Lacy, American saxophonist and composer (died 2004).
  - Tony Lee, British pianist (died 2004).
- 24
  - Ahmad Alaadeen, American saxophonist (died 2010).
  - Rudy Collins, American drummer (died 1988).
- 25 – Don Ellis, American trumpeter, and drummer (died 1978).

August

- 15 – Georgy Garanian, Russian saxophonist (died 2010).
- 27 – Sylvia Telles, Brazilian singer (died 1966).
- 28 – Ethel Azama, American singer (died 1984).

September

- 1 – Teri Thornton, American singer (died 2000).
- 3 – Freddie King, American guitarist and singer (died 1976).
- 23 – Gino Paoli, Italian singer-songwriter.
- 26 – Dick Heckstall-Smith, English saxophonist (died 2004).
- 27 – Ib Glindemann, Danish trumpeter and orchestra leader (died 2019).

October

- 7 – Amiri Baraka, African-American writer and music critic (died 2014).
- 9 – Abdullah Ibrahim, South African pianist and composer.
- 20
  - Bill Chase, American trumpeter (died 1974).
  - Eddie Harris, American saxophonist (died 1996).
- 26 – Jacques Loussier, French pianist and composer (died 2019).
- 27
  - Barre Phillips, American upright bassist (died 2024).
  - Ivan Jullien, French trumpeter (died 2015).
- 29
  - Jimmy Woods, American alto saxophonist (died 2018).
  - Pim Jacobs, Dutch pianist (died 1996).

November

- 7 – Jan Allan, Swedish trumpeter and composer.
- 10 – Houston Person, American tenor saxophonist.
- 14 – Ellis Marsalis Jr., American pianist (died 2020).
- 17 – Marion Montgomery, American-born singer (died 2002).
- 20 – Colin Smith, English trumpeter (died 2004).
- 23 – Victor Gaskin, American upright bassist (died 2012).
- 29 – Tony Coe, English clarinettist and tenor saxophonist (died 2023).

December

- 5 – Art Davis, American upright bassist (died 2007).
- 6 – Norio Maeda, Japanese composer and pianist (died 2018).
- 21 – Hank Crawford, American alto saxophonist, arranger and songwriter (died 2009).
- 24 – John Critchinson, English pianist (died 2017).
- 28 – Bob Cunningham, American bassist (died 2017).

Unknown date

- Delisa Newton, American vocalist (died 2004).
- Pat Moran McCoy, American pianist.
