= 1946 in jazz =

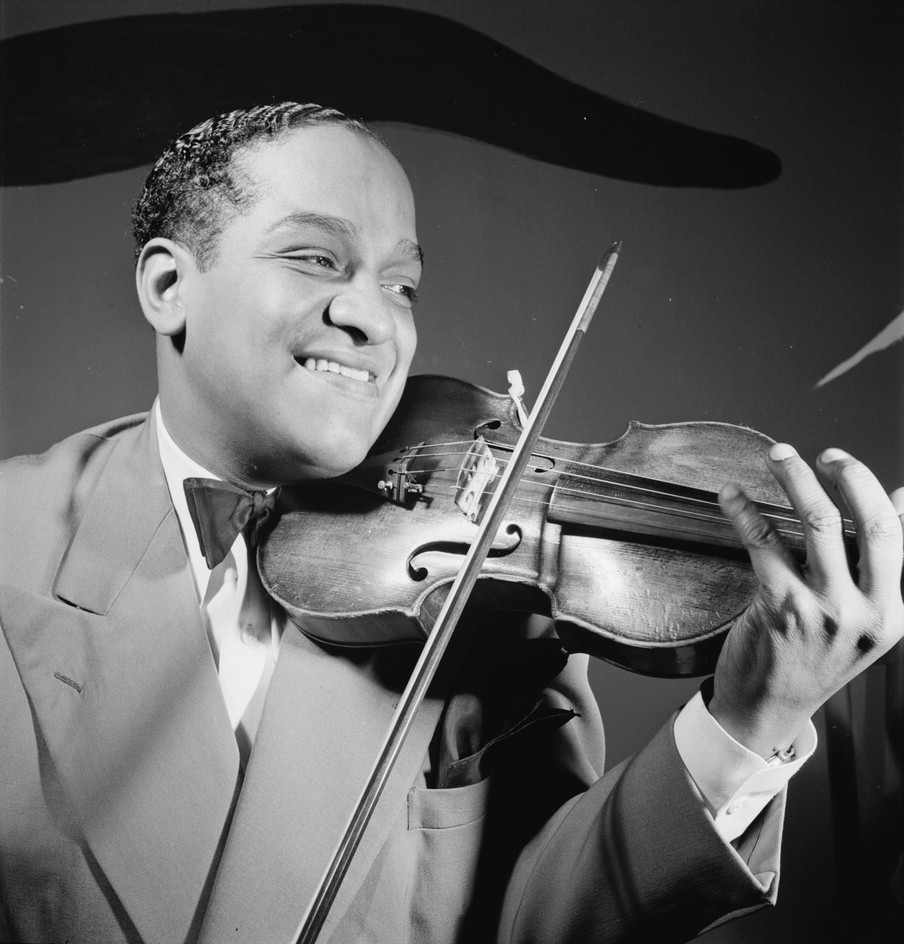
- Eddie South, New York City, December 1946
- Decade: 1940s in jazz
- Music: 1946 in music
- Standards: List of 1940s jazz standards
- See also: 1945 in jazz – 1947 in jazz

This is a timeline documenting events in Jazz in the year 1946.

== Events ==
- The Jazz Journal is established in London by Sinclair Traill, originally under the title Pick Up.
- Armstrong wins the Esquire Gold award for Vocalist.
- John Serry appears as the featured guest artist on Gordon MacRae's radio show "SkyLine Roof" on the CBS network under the musical direction of Archie Bleyer.

== Album releases ==
- Accordion Capers (Sonora, 1946) - with the Joe Biviano Accordion Rhythm Sextette, guitarist Tony Mottola and accordionist John Serry
- Artistry in Rhythm – Stan Kenton

== Births ==
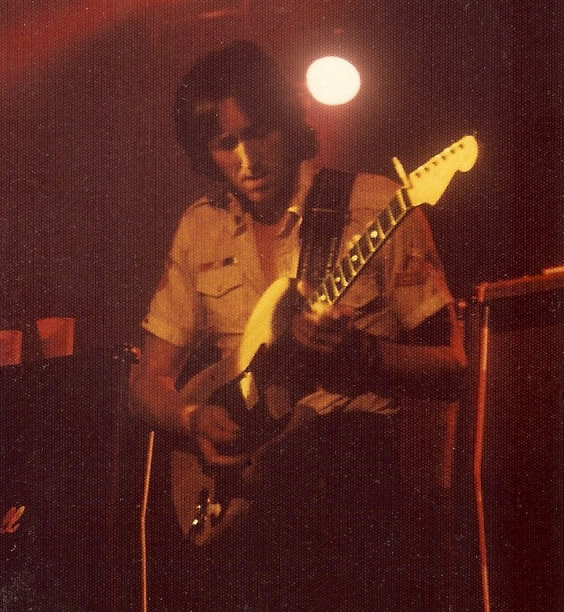
Allan Holdsworth

January

- 4 — Susannah McCorkle, American singer (died 2001).
- 4 — André Ceccarelli, French drummer and composer.
- 3 — James Mtume, American percussionist, keyboardist, songwriter and record producer, Mtume (died 2022).
- 12 – George Duke, American keyboard pioneer, composer, singer and producer (died 2013).
- 16 – Spike Wells, English drummer and priest.
- 20 – John Sheridan, American pianist.
- 24 – Marion Cowings, American singer and university teacher.
- 30 – Michael S. Smith, American drummer and percussionist (died 2006).
- 31 – Terry Kath, American guitarist and vocalist, Chicago (died 1978).

February

- 20 – J. Geils, American jazz and blues guitarist in The J. Geils Band (died 2017).
- 21 – Terry Bradds, American guitarist.
- 22 – Tom Grant, American pianist and vocalist.
- 24 – Tullio De Piscopo, Italian drummer and singer.
- 28
  - Mike Renzi, American pianist, arranger and musical director.
  - Pierre Dørge, Danish guitarist, bandleader, and composer.

March

- 1 — Vinny Golia, American composer and multi-instrumentalist.
- 11 – Patty Waters, American singer.
- 19 – Jack Schaeffer, American musician, recording artist, producer and arranger.
- 22
  - Jerry Jemmott, American bass guitarist.
  - Melvin Sparks, American guitarist (died 2011).

April

- 13 – Al Green, American singer.
- 14 – Knut Kristiansen, Norwegian pianist and orchestra leader.
- 16 – Ivar Antonsen, Norwegian pianist.
- 24 – Stafford James, American bassist.
- 25 – Digby Fairweather, British cornettist and broadcaster.
- 29 – Humphrey Carpenter, English musician, biographer, and writer (died 2005).
- 30 – Joel Futterman, American pianist and curved soprano saxophonist.

May

- 2 — Joel Forrester, American composer and pianist.
- 5 — Jack Walrath, American trumpeter and arranger.
- 10 – Jimmy Ponder, American guitarist (died 2013).
- 12 – Rudolf Tomsits, Hungarian trumpeter, flugelhornist, and composer (died 2003).
- 22 – Martin Kratochvíl, American jazz rock musician.
- 23 – Don Moye, American percussionist and drummer.
- 27 – Niels-Henning Ørsted Pedersen, Danish upright bassist (died 2005).
- 28 – Claudio Roditi, Brazilian trumpeter (died 2020).

June

- 7 — Zbigniew Seifert, Polish violinist (died 1979).
- 16 – Tom Harrell, American trumpet and flugelhorn player.
- 17 – B. J. Cole, English pedal steel guitarist.
- 18 – William Hooker, American drummer and composer.
- 24 – Clint Houston, American upright bassist (died 2000).
- 29 – Ken Hyder, Scottish fusion drummer.

July

- 3 — John Klemmer, American saxophonist, composer, songwriter, and arranger.
- 6 — Toquinho, Brazilian singer and guitarist.
- 11 – Kimiko Itoh, Japanese singer.
- 17
  - Ellade Bandini, Italian drummer.
  - Per Henrik Wallin, Swedish pianist and composer (died 2005).
- 20 – Bob McHugh, American pianist, composer, and educator.
- 23 – Khan Jamal, American vibraphone and marimba player.
- 24 – Al Lowe, American video game designer, programmer, and musician.

August

- 6 — Allan Holdsworth, English guitarist (died 2017).
- 14 – Bjørn Kruse, Norwegian saxophonist and composer.
- 27 – Roland Prince, Antiguan guitarist (died 2016).
- 31
  - Cooper-Moore, American pianist, composer, and instrument builder/designer.
  - Su Cruickshank, Australian singer (died 2009).

September

- 4 — Dave Liebman, American saxophonist and flautist.
- 18 – Benjamín Brea, Venezuelan woodwind player (died 2014).
- 23 – Duster Bennett, British singer and guitarist, Fleetwood Mac (died 1976).
- 26 – Ted Greene, American guitarist (died 2005).
- 28 – Helen Shapiro, English singer.

October

- 1 — Dave Holland, English upright bassist, composer, and bandleader.
- 3 — Mike Clark, American drummer.
- 11 – Daryl Hall, American singer, keyboardist, guitarist, songwriter, and producer.
- 12 – Daryl Runswick, English composer, arranger, musician, producer, and educationalist.
- 15
  - Bo Stief, Danish bassist, composer and arranger.
  - Palle Danielsson, Swedish upright bassist.
- 22 – Jac Berrocal, French trumpeter, singer, and composer.

November

- 4 — Billy Hancock, American singer, guitarist, bassist, and multiinstrumentalist (died 2018).
- 7 — Raymond Harry Brown, American composer, arranger, and trumpeter.
- 18 – Bennie Wallace, American tenor saxophonist.
- 20 – Bruno Tommaso, Italian upright bassist and composer.
- 23 – Ray Drummond, American upright bassist and teacher.
- 25 – Guilherme Franco, Brazilian percussionist (died 2016).

December

- 7
  - Phil Treloar, Australian drummer, percussionist and composer.
  - Trent Kynaston, American saxophonist, music educator and composer.
- 12
  - Bruce Ditmas, American drummer and percussionist.
  - Denny Dias, American musician.
- 14 – Jerome Cooper, American drummer (died 2015).
- 16 – René McLean, American saxophonist and flutist.

Unknown date

- Atilla Engin, Turkish-American drummer.
- Carter Jefferson, American tenor saxophonist (died 1993).
- Douglas Ewart, Jamaican multi-instrumentalist and instrument builder.
- Frank Gibson, Jr., New Zealand drummer and drum tutor.
- Peter Langston, American guitarist and computer programmer.
- Riccardo Zegna, Italian pianist.
- Roger Turner, English percussionist.

== Deaths ==
January

- 30 – Fred Beckett, American trombonist (born 1917).

February

- 15 Putney Dandridge, American bandleader, jazz pianist and vocalist (born 1902).

July

- 20 – Tricky Sam Nanton, American trombonist with the Duke Ellington Orchestra (born 1904).

September

- 16 Mamie Smith, American vaudeville singer, dancer, pianist and actress (born 1883).

October

- 3 – James Tim Brymn, American conductor, arranger, composer, and pianist (born 1881).

Unknown date

- Joseph Petit, American jazz trombonist (born 1873).
- Manuel Perez, New Orleans jazz cornetist and bandleader (born 1871).

== See also ==
- 1940s in jazz
- List of years in jazz
- 1946 in music

== Bibliography ==
- The New Real Book, Volume I. Sher Music. 1988. ISBN 0-9614701-4-3.
- The New Real Book, Volume II. Sher Music. 1991. ISBN 0-9614701-7-8.
- The New Real Book, Volume III. Sher Music. 1995. ISBN 1-883217-30-X.
- The Real Book, Volume I (6th ed.). Hal Leonard. 2004. ISBN 0-634-06038-4.
- The Real Book, Volume II (2nd ed.). Hal Leonard. 2007. ISBN 978-1-4234-2452-9.
- The Real Book, Volume III (2nd ed.). Hal Leonard. 2006. ISBN 0-634-06136-4.
- The Real Jazz Book. Warner Bros. ISBN 978-91-85041-36-7.
- The Real Vocal Book, Volume I. Hal Leonard. 2006. ISBN 0-634-06080-5.
