= Bob McHugh =

Bob McHugh may refer to:

- Bob McHugh (footballer)
- Bob McHugh (musician)
