= Licence to Funk =

Studio album by Nils Landgren Funk Unit
- Released: April 10–13, 2007
- Recorded: Recorded at Atlantis Studios Stockholm by Ranne Hansson on April 10–13, 2007 and by Stefan Boman on April 14, 2007
- Genre: Jazz
- Label: ACT

Nils Landgren Funk Unit chronology
Christmas with My Friends (2006)	Licence to Funk (2007)	Funk for Life (2010)

Licence to Funk is a 2007 jazz / funk album by Nils Landgren.

Christian Genzel of AllMusic rated the album 3.5 out of 5 stars, describing it as "basically an homage to various types of old-school '70s funk".

== Track listing ==
1. "House Party" 5:05 (Fred Wesley)
2. "Freak U" 4:34 (Magnum Coltrane Price)
3. "24 Hours" 4:30 (Nils Landgren)
4. "Stuff Like That" 5:39 (Quincy Jones, Nick Ashford, Valerie Simpson)
5. "Slowfoot" 5:49 (Wolfgang Haffner)
6. "Capetown Shuffle" 5:51 (Min Nils Landgren)
7. "Secret" 4:39 (Wolfgang Haffner, Magnum Coltrane Price)
8. "Samplerayt" 5:40 (Ida Sandlund)
9. "For Those Who Like to Party" 4:25 (Ida Sandlund)
10. "At Home" 5:21 (Ray Parker Jr.)
11. "Tomomis Tune" 6:57 (Stix Hooper)
12. "Brazos River Breakdown" 5:10 (Magnum Coltrane Price)

== Performers ==
- Magnus Lindgren - vocals / tenor saxophone / flute
- Ray Parker Jr. - guitar
- Nils Landgren - trombone
- Ida Sandlund - keyboards
- Magnum Coltrane Price - bass guitar
- Wolfgang Haffner - drums
