= Bengt-Arne Wallin =

Swedish jazz composer, arranger, and musician

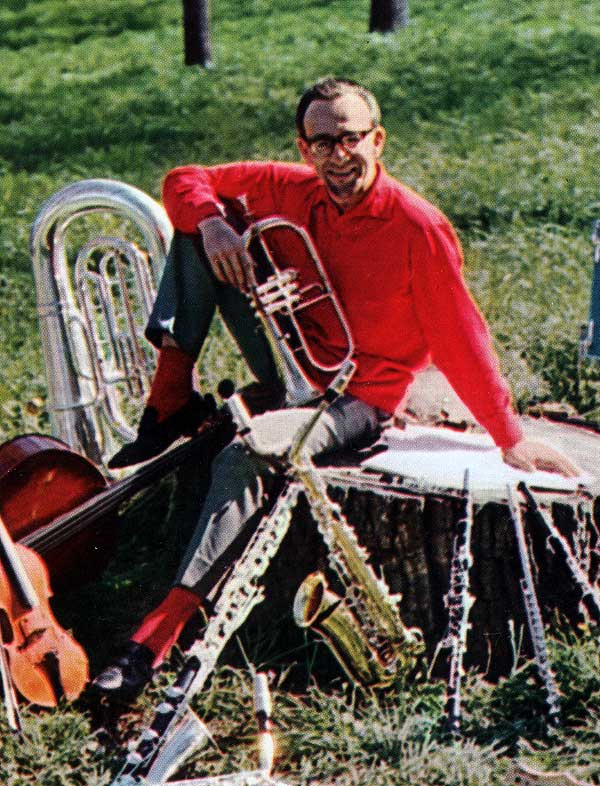

Background information
- Born: 13 July 1926
- Died: 23 November 2015 (aged 89)
- Genres: jazz
- Instruments: trumpet and flugelhorn

Bengt-Arne Wallin (13 July 1926 – 23 November 2015) was a Swedish jazz composer, arranger, trumpeter, and flugelhorn player who played jazz influenced by Swedish traditional folk music. He also wrote film scores.

== Biography ==
Wallin was born in Linköping. Between 1953 and 1965, he worked in the ensembles of Arne Domnérus and Lars Gullin, as well as the Radiobandet with Harry Arnold. He performed with Lill Lindfors and Svante Thuresson. During this time he also participated in Benny Golson's sessions with Scandinavian musicians.

His arrangements of Swedish folklore, which were initially recorded under the title Old Folklore in Swedish Modern 1962 with a big band, featured soloists such as Domnérus, Idrees Sulieman, Sahib Shihab and Georg Riedel and strings. He returned to this musical area in 1997 with the JazzBaltica ensemble (including Tomasz Stańko, Nils Landgren, Bugge Wesseltoft and Wolfgang Schlüter). From 1972 to 1993, he worked as a lecturer at the Royal College of Music, Stockholm.

== Awards and honors ==
In 1962 and 2002, he was awarded the Swedish jazz prize Gyllene Skivan. For his music production Visa fran Barnrike he received in 1970 the international radio award Prix Triumph Variete. He was awarded the Illis quorum by the Swedish government in 2002. In 2010 he was honored with the Swedish Django d'Or as "Master of Jazz".

== Discography ==
- Isn't It Romantic (Vik, 1957)
- Old Folklore in Swedish Modern (DUX, 1962)
- Adventures in Jazz and Folklore (DUX, 1965)
- Barnkammarmusik (Megafon, 1966)
- Dear John (Dunhill, 1966)
- Visa Fran Barnrike (SR, 1970)
- The Magic Box (SR, 1971)
- Wallin/Wallin (DUX, 1971)
- Varmluft (Sonet, 1972)
- The Unexpected Symphony (Sonet, 1979)
- Live at Montreux Jazz Festival (Dragon, 1983)
- Miles from Duke (Phono Suecia, 1986)
- A Swedish Tribute to Duke (Phono Suecia, 1995)
- The Birth and Rebirth of Swedish Folk Jazz (ACT, 1998)
