= Jazz Baltica =

Annual jazz festival near Kiel, Germany

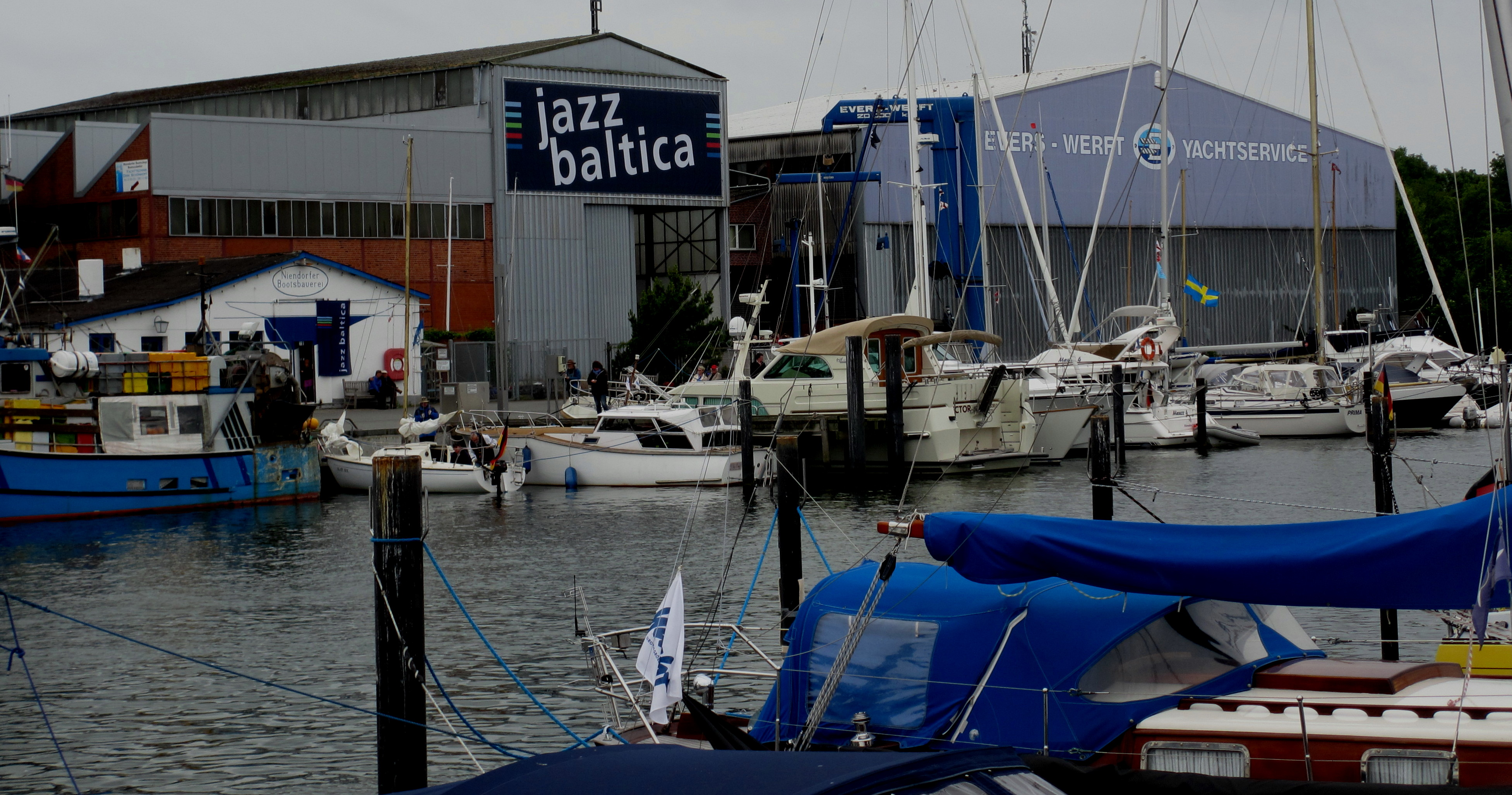
- Genre: Jazz Festival
- Dates: June or July
- Locations: Timmendorfer Strand, Ostholstein, Schleswig-Holstein, Germany
- Coordinates: 53°59′58″N 10°46′55″E
- Founders: Rainer Haarmann
- Attendance: 19,000 (2019)
- Website: jazzbaltica.com

Jazz Baltica is a jazz festival which was started in 1990. Up until 2011 it was held every summer in Schloss Salzau (Salzau Palace) near Kiel, Germany, and the coast of the Baltic Sea. In 2009 the festival was directed by Bengt-Arne Wallin and in 2012, Swedish trombonist Nils Landgren took over as artistic director and it was moved to the Evers-Werft shipyard at the harbor of Niendorf, a Baltic Sea resort near Lübeck.

The festival attracts jazz musicians from around the globe and is a noted event on the yearly jazz calendar. Artists who have played at the festival include: Wolfgang Dauner, Marcin Wasilewski (pianist), Kate McGarry, and Nils Landgren, Gwilym Simcock.

It differs from most other festivals in its intimacy and the access that visitors have to the musicians. The festival has changed its focus to feature primarily musicians from Northern Germany, Scandinavia and the Baltic countries. Between 20–23 June 2019 approximately 19,000 visitors celebrated the 29th edition of JazzBaltica in Timmendorfer Strand - 2000 more than 2018.

Since 2002, Jazz Baltica has been conducted as part of the Schleswig-Holstein Musik Festival. Until 2011 the festival's founder Rainer Haarmann was the musical director for most years. The festival takes place around the last weekend of June.

What makes this festival so unique is its intimate nature due to the relatively small concert venues, which limits the number of attendees to several thousand on any given day. This gives attendees unusually close-up access to jazz artists. The festival starts Friday afternoon and runs through Sunday night. It concentrates on music from bebop through to contemporary jazz with a smattering of world music. Besides the concerts that require tickets, there are also free midday concerts by young local musicians and free concerts in the late evening.
