= Cork Jazz Festival =

Music festival in Cork City, Ireland

- Genre: Jazz
- Dates: Late October
- Locations: Cork, Ireland
- Years active: 1978–present (48 years)
- Website: guinnesscorkjazzfestival.com

The Cork Jazz Festival is an annual music festival held in Cork City, Ireland, in late October. The first festival began on Friday 27 October 1978, and has been held every year (except in 2020 due to the COVID-19 pandemic).

The festival is Ireland's biggest jazz event and attracts hundreds of musicians and thousands of music fans to the city each year.

== History ==
=== 1970s origins ===
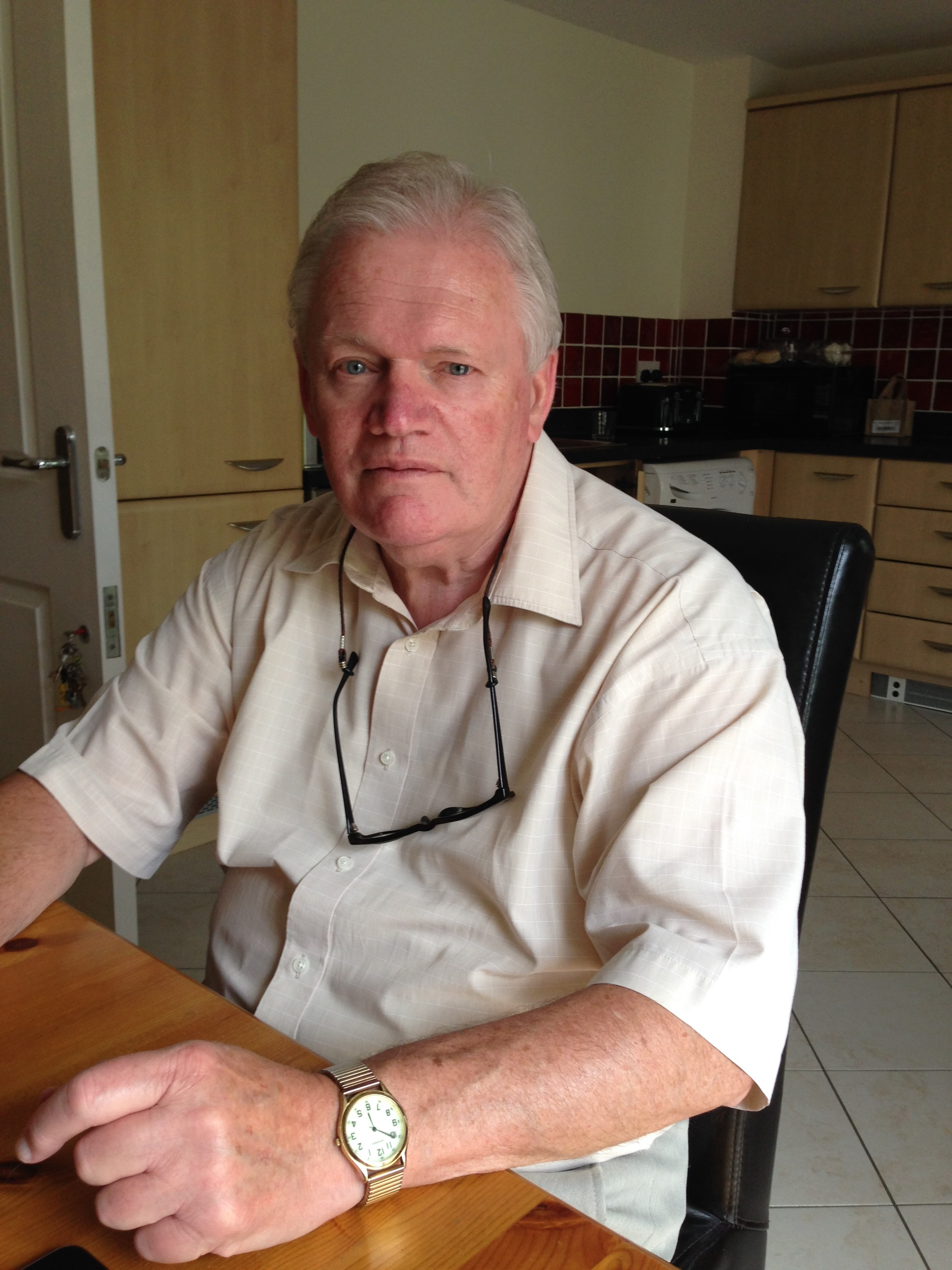
Jim Mountjoy, festival founder and director in the 1970s–1980s (pictured 2017)

The Guinness Cork Jazz Festival traces its origins to a practical problem rather than an artistic vision. In 1977, Labour Minister Michael O'Leary introduced a new bank holiday at the end of October. The following year, a bridge tournament that had been booked into the Metropole Hotel on McCurtain Street in Cork was cancelled at short notice, leaving the hotel with empty rooms over the newly created long weekend. Jim Mountjoy, the hotel's marketing manager, convened a meeting with a small group of associates, among them jazz musician Harry Connolly, who had been playing at the hotel for nearly a decade. Connolly later recalled suggesting music as a solution on the spot. Mountjoy secured approximately £5,000 to £7,000 in sponsorship from tobacco manufacturer John Player, and the first Cork Jazz Festival took place on Friday, 27 October 1978.

The opening night was officiated by the Lord Mayor of Cork, Councillor Brian Sloane. The Evening Echo reported that the debut event received a "tumultuous send-off" before a capacity audience. The line-up for that inaugural festival included Ronnie Scott, Kenny Ball and the Jazzmen, George Melly and the John Chilton Feetwarmers, Annie Ross, the Harry South Trio, and Monty Sunshine. Ronnie Scott performed first, opening the festival in the ballroom of the Metropole Hotel before an audience of around 300 people. The second festival, in 1979, featured Art Blakey and the Jazz Messengers, Oscar Peterson, Barney Kessel, Memphis Slim, and Alexis Korner, among others.

=== 1980s ===
Through the 1980s, the festival drew further major names. Ella Fitzgerald performed in 1980 and was paid a reported £16,000 for two appearances at Cork Opera House. She was 62 at the time and had been on a demanding European tour, but reviews were rapturous. In 1981, Guinness replaced John Player as the principal sponsor, a relationship that has continued to the present day. That same year, tenor saxophonist Sonny Rollins performed at the Opera House, a performance that festival co-founder Pearse Harvey described as a "revelation". In 1982, the American singer Blossom Dearie caused organisers some anxiety when she refused to perform under the existing lighting in the Metropole dining room, insisting on a pink environment. Committee member Bernie Casey resolved the situation by purchasing pink crepe paper and covering the light bulbs. Buddy Rich performed at Cork Opera House in 1986.

=== 1990s ===
By the 1990s, the festival had established itself as a significant annual event, with average visitor numbers exceeding 40,000. Dizzy Gillespie appeared in 1990, the year before he was diagnosed with pancreatic cancer; he died in 1993. Among the many other artists to have performed in the period included George Shearing, Wynton Marsalis, Chick Corea, Jan Garbarek, Herbie Hancock, Dave Brubeck, Gerry Mulligan, Cleo Laine, and B.B. King

=== 21st century ===
In 2002, the Swedish pianist Esbjörn Svensson and his trio performed at the Everyman, a gig remembered as a landmark of the festival's engagement with European jazz. The Texan pianist Robert Glasper performed in 2010, and Damon Albarn brought an ensemble of artists from his Honest Jon's label to the Savoy in 2011. Manchester trio GoGo Penguin played the Triskel Arts Centre in 2015, and Norwegian pianist Tord Gustavsen appeared in 2018 as part of a growing connection between Triskel and the German ECM record label.

Jim Carroll of the Irish Times criticised the festival in October 2015, noting that acts such as The Coronas, Gary Numan, and the Boomtown Rats had been included in the programme and arguing that the festival had abandoned any meaningful engagement with contemporary jazz at a time when the genre was in robust creative health internationally. Similarly, Cormac Larkin of the Irish Times criticised the festival in October 2019, noting that the programme had reverted to including non-jazz headliners such as Aslan and Martha Reeves and that the festival lacked credible artistic direction following the departure of director Sinéad Dunphy after a single year in the role. Larkin observed that the more credible jazz programming that year had been organised independently, by Triskel Arts Centre director Tony Sheehan and trombonist Paul Dunlea at the Cork Opera House's Green Room series.

The festival was cancelled in 2020 due to the Covid-19 pandemic, the first October bank holiday without the festival since 1977. It returned in 2021, becoming the first major festival in Ireland to take place following the pandemic.

Philip Watson of the Irish Times criticised the festival in October 2025, its 47th edition, noting that only one of the more than 20 headline acts (London saxophonist Nubya Garcia) could be described as a genuine jazz performer. Watson argued that the festival had become a jazz festival in name only and questioned whether director Mark Murphy, who had held the role since 2021, had sufficient grounding in contemporary jazz to programme it effectively. Watson also noted the festival's failure to sign up to the Keychange gender-balance initiative and its poor representation of female instrumentalists.

By 2025, the festival had grown into a five-day event running from Thursday to the October bank holiday Monday, featuring more than 500 musicians across approximately 100 events in almost 80 venues. Cork Airport expected over 62,000 passengers over the bank holiday weekend, and the festival was estimated to generate in excess of €50 million in hospitality-related revenue for the Cork economy, amounting to approximately €1 million per operating hour. Festival director Mark Murphy described the event as "an Irish cultural institution". Jim Mountjoy, the festival's founder, died in February 2025. Taoiseach Micheál Martin led tributes, saying Mountjoy had left "a wonderful, happy legacy in music, entertainment, and the development of Cork as a festival city".
