= The Emancipation Procrastination =

Studio album by Christian Scott
- Released: October 20, 2017
- Recorded: April 16–21, 2016
- Studios: The Parlor, New Orleans, LA
- Genre: Jazz
- Length: 53:01
- Labels: Ropeadope Records RAD-380, Stretch Music
- Producers: Christian aTunde Adjuah, Chris Dunn

Christian Scott chronology
Diaspora (2017)	The Emancipation Procrastination (2017)	Ancestral Recall (2019)

Professional ratings
Aggregate scores
Source	Rating
Metacritic	83/100
Review scores
Source	Rating
Allmusic	4/5 stars
Exclaim!	9/10
Erie Reader	4.25/5
Financial Times	4/5 stars
Mojo	4/5 stars
Pitchfork	7.9/10
Tom Hull	B+

The Emancipation Procrastination is a studio album by American jazz trumpeter Christian Scott released on October 20, 2017, by Ropeadope Records. The album is the third and final installment of The Centennial Trilogy, with Ruler Rebel and Diaspora being the first and the second respectively. The Emancipation Procrastination was nominated for a Grammy Award at the 61st Grammy ceremony.

== Background ==
The album's title is a play on words referring to President Lincoln's 1863 Emancipation Proclamation to free more than 3.5 million enslaved people in the secessionist Confederate states. The Emancipation Procrastination delves into darkness and social commentary rarely treated with such a light hand.

== Reception ==
The Emancipation Procrastination was nominated for a Grammy Award at the 61st Grammy ceremony. This marks the Adjuah's second nomination. At Metacritic, that assigns a normalized rating out of 100 to reviews from mainstream critics, the album received an average score of 83, based on four reviews, which indicates "universal acclaim".

Seth Colter Walls of Pitchfork stated "After two releases filled with high-concept fusion, some listeners might be hungry for solos that hang around longer and aren’t so beholden to the mood of the production. Adjuah delivers exactly this on The Emancipation Procrastination. It is also here that he more willingly invites associations with past styles. The prominent use of electric guitar suggests a vintage rock-fusion approach, and soulful Fender Rhodes playing by Lawrence Fields often seems like it’s channeling some of Miles Davis’ late-1960s sound... he settles on a final texture, one both burnished and regal. It's the sound of a player confident not just in his chops, but fully at home in his own compositional world." In his review for Financial Times, Mike Hobart commented, "It is the spirited interplay of the just-released The Emancipation Procrastination that begins to reveal historical jazz roots, though the jams reference Miles Davis and fusion jazz rather than the stomps and rags of old-time New Orleans."

Matt Collar of Allmusic wrote "The Emancipation Procrastination... flips the paradigm, and fully embraces his own brand of trip-hop-inflected electronic jazz fusion. It's an approach he's been exploring since at least 2015's Stretch Music, an album whose title Scott also uses as an all-encompassing definition for his particular style of jazz. The definition might even be more applicable than ever here, as Scott pushes his sound even further away from the strict jazz tradition and into a multi-hyphenated region of jazz-tinged trip-hop electronica. As the title implies, The Emancipation Procrastination is a break from the past, and is so forward-thinking and contemporary that it really doesn't sound like a jazz album in any traditional sense. But you get the distinct impression that Scott wouldn't have it any other way." Geraldine Wyckoff of OffBeat commented "The Emancipation Procrastination ends much as it began, with the warmth of jazz winding through refreshingly familiar yet excitingly new paths. The vividly persistent horn and adventurous nature of Christian Scott aTunde Adjuah bravely lead the way".

== Track listing ==
The Emancipation Procrastination track listing
No.	Title	Writer(s)	Length
1.	"The Emancipation Procrastination"	Scott	6:25
2.	"AvengHer"	Scott	5:02
3.	"Ruler Rebel (X. aTunde Adjuah Remix)"	Scott	5:54
4.	"Ashes of Our Forever"	Scott	4:07
5.	"In the Beginning (Interlude)" (Feat. Weedie Braimah)	Weedie Braimah	2:24
6.	"Michele with One L"	Scott	3:11
7.	"The Cypher"	Scott	4:46
8.	"Videotape"	Colin Charles Greenwood, Thomas Edward Yorke, Philip James Selway	4:40
9.	"Gerrymandering Game"	Cliff Hynes, Scott, Lawrence Fields	2:03
10.	"Unrigging November"	Scott	5:00
11.	"Cages" (Feat. Stephen J. Gladney)	Scott, Lawrence Fields	9:34
12.	"New Heroes"	Scott, Lawrence Fields	10:45
Total length:			53:01

== Personnel ==
- Christian Scott aTunde Adjuah – trumpet, siren, flugelhorn, MIDI controller [SPD-SX] (tracks: 1 2 3 4 6 7 8 9 10 11 12)
- Braxton Cook – alto saxophone (tracks: 1 3 4 7 8 11 12)
- Kris Funn – bass (tracks: 1 3 7 8 11 12)
- Luques Curtis – bass (tracks: 4 6 10)
- Weedie Braimah – djembe, bata, congas (tracks: 2 5 10)
- Joe Dyson Jr. – drums, MIDI controller [SPD-SX] (tracks: 1 3 4 7 10)
- Corey Fonville – drums, MIDI controller [SPD-SX] (tracks: 1 3 6 7 8 9 10 11 12)
- Marcus Gillmore – drums, MIDI controller [SPD-SX] (tracks: 2)
- Elena Pinderhughes – flute (tracks: 1 3 4 7 8 12)
- Cliff Hines – guitar (tracks: 3 4 9 10)
- Dominic Minix – guitar (tracks: 8)
- Matthew Stevens – guitar (tracks: 1 12)
- Lawrence Fields – piano, electric piano (tracks: 1 3 4 6 7 8 9 10 11 12)
- Stephen J. Gladney – tenor saxophone (tracks: 11)

== Chart performance ==
Chart	Peak position
US Top Jazz Albums (Billboard)	7
