= Ahmad Alaadeen =

American saxophonist

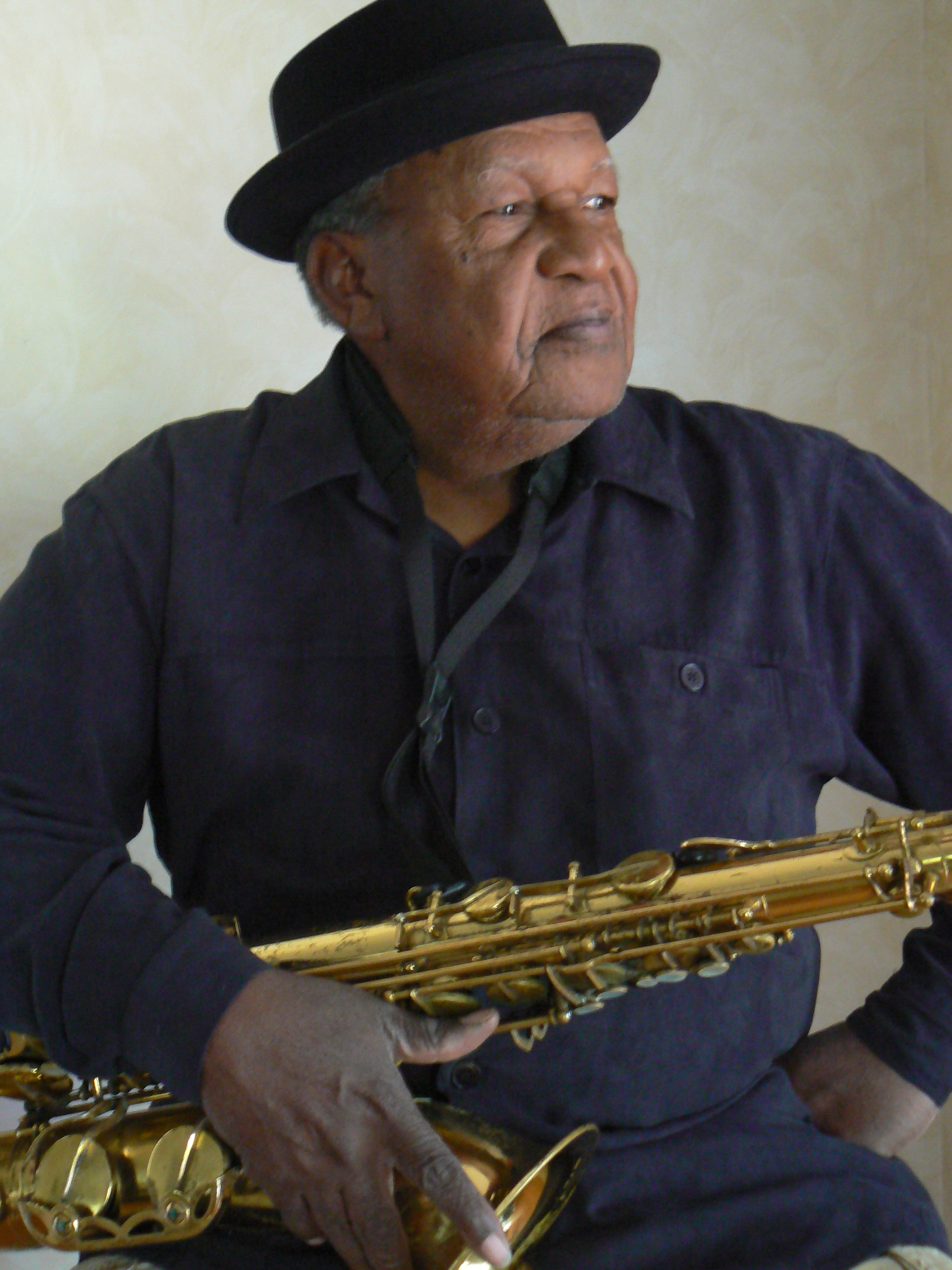
Ahmad Alaadeen

Ahmad Alaadeen (July 24, 1934 – August 15, 2010) was an American jazz saxophonist and educator whose career spanned over six decades. A longtime fixture on the Kansas City jazz scene, Aladeen came to wider prominence in the 1990s with a series of self-released albums featuring his swing- and hard bop-oriented compositions that led Allmusic critic Scott Yanow to declare that the saxophonist "deserves to be much better known."

== Discography ==
- and the beauty of it all – Alaadeen – 'ASR Records – Kansas City (2007)
- New Africa Suite – Alaadeen – 'ASR Records – Kansas City (2005)
- With This Voice – Luqman Hamza – Alaadeen featured – Groove Note Records – Recorded in Lenexa, KS (2000)
- Louis Neal Big Band – Alaadeen featured – Kansas City, MO (1999)
- Taken By Surprise – Norman Hedman's Tropique – Alaadeen featured – New York, NY (1999)
- It's A Wonderful World – Alaadeen with Jay McShann – Groove Note Records, Los Angeles, CA – Recorded in Lenexa, KS (1999)
- Time Through The Ages – Alaadeen – 'ASR 2001 (1997) – Kansas City, MO
- Alaadeen and The Deans of Swing Plays Blues For RC and Josephine, too – Alaadeen – 'ASR 1001 (1995) – Kansas City, MO
- Live Jazz on the Plaza – Alaadeen – Fandeen Publishing Company (1990) – Kansas City, MO
- Clear Sounds of Kansas City – Sprint (1989) – Kansas City, MO
- Bright Lights – Big City – Alaadeen with the City Lights Jazz Ensemble – Accent Music (1988) – Kansas City, MO
- Tain't What Cha Do, It's The Way How Cha Do IT – Alaadeen with the City Light Orchestra – City Light Records (1986) – Kansas City, MO
- Raised Spirits – Alaadeen with the City Light Orchestra – City Light Records (1984) – Kansas City, MO
- Come Back Baby – Federal 12266 – Linda Hopkins – Kansas City, Feb. 9th 1956 – 78"
- I'm Going To Cry You – Right Out Of My Mind – Federal 12266 – Linda Hopkins – Kansas City, - Feb. 9th 1956 – 78"
- Mama Needs – Your Loving Baby – Federal – 12365 – Linda Hopkins – Kansas City, Feb. 9th 1956 – 78"
- Danny Boy – Federal 12365 – Linda Hopkins – Kansas City, Feb. 9th 1956 – 78"
- Eatin' Watermelon – Alaadeen with Crown Prince Waterford and Jimmy Witherspoon (1950s)
