= Per Henrik Wallin =

Swedish jazz pianist and composer

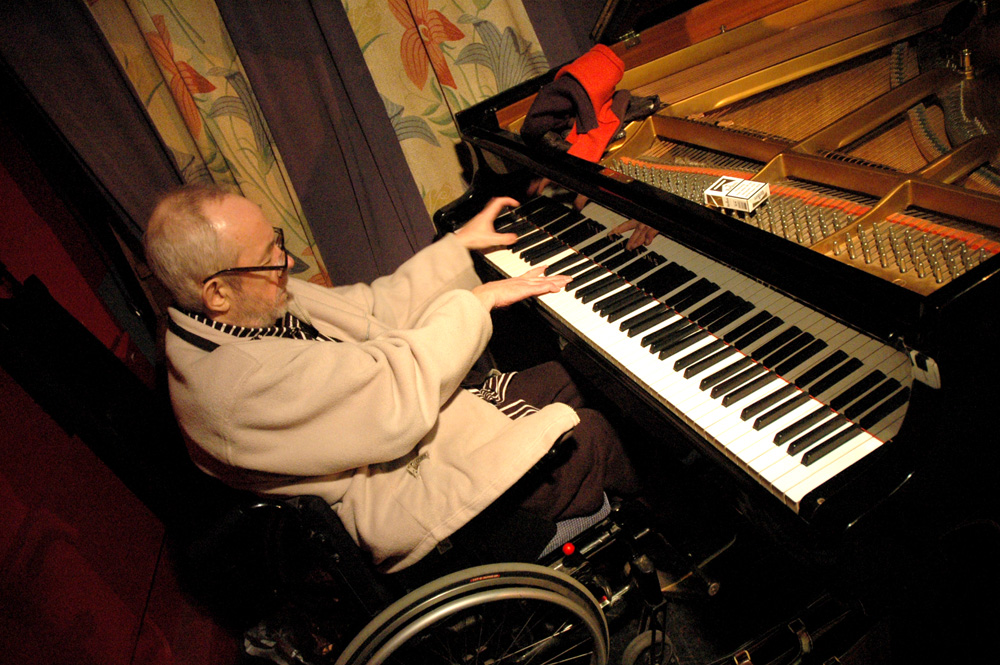
Per Henrik Wallin in 2005

Per Henrik Wallin (July 17, 1946 – June 15, 2005) was a Swedish jazz pianist and composer. He was acclaimed in Continental Europe, but relatively obscure in the United States. He received the Swedish variant of the Golden Django two years before his death.
