= Riccardo Zegna =

Italian jazz musician (born 1946)

Riccardo Zegna (born 1946) is an Italian jazz musician.

== Biography ==
Zegna was born near Turin into a family of musicians. As a very young child he toured northern Italy playing the congas in the Zegna Big Band of his father Ilario. At the age of 5 he also started playing drums, and at 13 began studying classical piano. In 1970 he gained a diploma from the Nicolo Paganini Conservatory in Genoa, and began consequently performing in piano recitals.

In 1976, after performing in countless jam sessions at Turin's "Swing Club" or Milan's "Capolinea" club, Zegna then starting dedicating his career to jazz. The late 1970s and 1980s saw him collaborating with various musicians including Buddy Tate, Eddie "Lockjaw" Davis, Sweets Edison, Bob Berg, Bob Haggart, Gil Goldstein, Lee Konitz, George Coleman, Steve Grossman and Kay Winding.

In 1983, he played at the "Parade du Jazz" with Pepper Adams in Nice, France. He has appeared as sideman on numerous recordings and in 1986 appeared on the albums Alliance, Simbiosi and Disguise along with saxophonist Pietro Tonolo and Joe Chambers.

In 1996, Zegna finally released his first solo piano album Andalusa to critical and artistic acclaim, and another soon after with a trio, entitled Green Dolphin Street. In 1999, he was invited to play with Paul Jeffrey at the Savoy Club in New York City and at the Duke University in Durham, North Carolina. That same year he formed his own group with clarinettist Gabriele Mirabassi, where he was finally able to experiment with amalgamating chamber music and jazz, choosing jazz and classical musicians to perform his compositions. The result of this was the album Piccolo Valzer and soon after Barcarola, both for the Italian label Egea.

Zegna has appeared at the Umbria Jazz Festival many times, either as sideman or with his own group. In 2002, he played for Radio ORF in Vienna. In 2004, again with Pietro Tonolo, recorded the album Oltremare, with Paul Motian. Another milestone for 2004 was his piano solo performance at the Southport International Jazz Festival. In 2006 he released his third album for Egea entitled Carillon. In 2007, he worked as arranger and pianist on the theatrical production of Marilyn Monroe in Jazz with the English singer Joanna Rimmer.
