= Ruler Rebel =

Studio album by Christian Scott
- Released: March 31, 2017
- Recorded: April 16–21, 2016
- Studios: The Parlor, New Orleans, LA
- Genre: Jazz
- Length: 35:41
- Label: Ropeadope Records RAD-352, Stretch Music
- Producers: Christian Scott aTunde Adjuah, Chris Dunn

Christian Scott chronology
Stretch Music (2015)	Ruler Rebel (2017)	Diaspora (2017)

Professional ratings
Review scores
Source	Rating
Financial Times	4/5 stars
The Guardian	4/5 stars
The Irish Times	4/5 stars
Jazzwise	4/5 stars
Pitchfork	7.6/10
Record Collector	4/5 stars
The Times	4/5 stars
Tom Hull	B+

Ruler Rebel is a studio album by American jazz trumpeter Christian Scott released on March 31, 2017 by Ropeadope Records. The album is the first installment of The Centennial Trilogy, with Diaspora and The Emancipation Procrastination being the second and the third ones respectively.

== Background ==
The album discusses Scott's hometown of New Orleans. Ruler Rebel is the first album in the Centennial Trilogy to honor the 100-year anniversary of the song often considered to be the first jazz recording. The trilogy, at its core, is a sobering re-evaluation of the social political realities of the world through sound. The series speaks to a litany of issues that continue to plague our collective experiences: slavery in America via the prison industrial complex, food insecurity, xenophobia, immigration, climate change, sexual orientation, gender equality, fascism and the return of the demagogue.

== Reception ==
Mike Hobart of Financial Times stated "The brash-toned New Orleans-raised trumpeter brands his big-hearted fusion of the past and present stretch music. It’s a futuristic vision that combines traditional beats with sparse hip-hop textures and tugs the heart strings with lashings of trumpet. Scott pulls the disparate elements together brilliantly with strong moods, clear lines and melodies you can hum. This release, the first in a trilogy commemorating the centenary of the first jazz recordings, presents Scott centre stage, his tone burnished by tradition, playing with only the future in mind." John Bungey writing for The Times commented, "But if his ebullient, dramatic playing reflects the tradition of his native New Orleans, the settings in which he deploys it now do not. We’re a long way from the swinging rhythms and rapid chord changes that so long signalled jazz. Instead, Scott’s glistening tone is set against trap music — the southern style of hip-hop with spare beats and cavernous bass — plus African drumming and electronica."

Adolf Alzufar of Ransom Note wrote "There's something political to the beauty of Scott’s Jazz. It allies street sounds with the contemporary now understood to be petit-bourgeois and bourgeois language into music that exists outside of classism and in a realm of idealism, like how Archie Schepp would. The album is a great achievement. In this world wherein economic inequality has come to define our everyday life and politics, music previously associated with select social constructs now has the umph and presence of Hip Hop."

Flood Magazine included the album in the Best Records of 2017 list. In his review Jason P. Woodbury wrote, "Ruler Rebel finds Scott’s “stretch music”—a blend of bop, trap, R&B, and electronic soul—more nuanced than ever. Presenting jazz as music of the moment as much as of the past, its fusion is subtle and deft."

== Track listing ==
Ruler Rebel track listing
No.	Title	Writer(s)	Length
1.	"Ruler Rebel"	Scott	5:45
2.	"New Orleanian Love Song"	Scott	2:33
3.	"New Orleanian Love Song II [X. aTunde Adjuah Remix]"	Scott	4:56
4.	"Phases" (Feat. Sarah Elizabeth Charles)	Cliff Hines, Sarah Elizabeth Charles	4:15
5.	"Rise Again [Allmos Remix]"	Scott, Allan Cole	3:42
6.	"Encryption" (Feat. Elena Pinderhughes)	Scott	5:38
7.	"The Coronation of X. aTunde Adjuah" (Feat. Elena Pinderhughes)	Scott	5:36
8.	"The Reckoning"	Scott	3:16
Total length:			35:41

== Personnel ==
- Christian Scott aTunde Adjuah – trumpet, siren, sirenette, reverse flugelhorn, SPD-SX, sampling, sonic architecture
- Elena Pinderhughes – flute
- Lawrence Fields – piano
- Luques Curtis – bass
- Kris Funn – bass
- Joshua Crumbly – bass
- Cliff Hines – guitar
- Corey Fonville – drums, SPD-SX
- Joe Dyson Jr. – pan-African Drums, SPD-SX
- Weedie Braimah – djembe, bata, congas
- Chief Shaka Shaka – dununba, sangban, kenikeni

== Chart performance ==
Chart (2017)	Peak position
US Jazz Albums (Billboard)	5
