= Delisa Newton =

American jazz musician

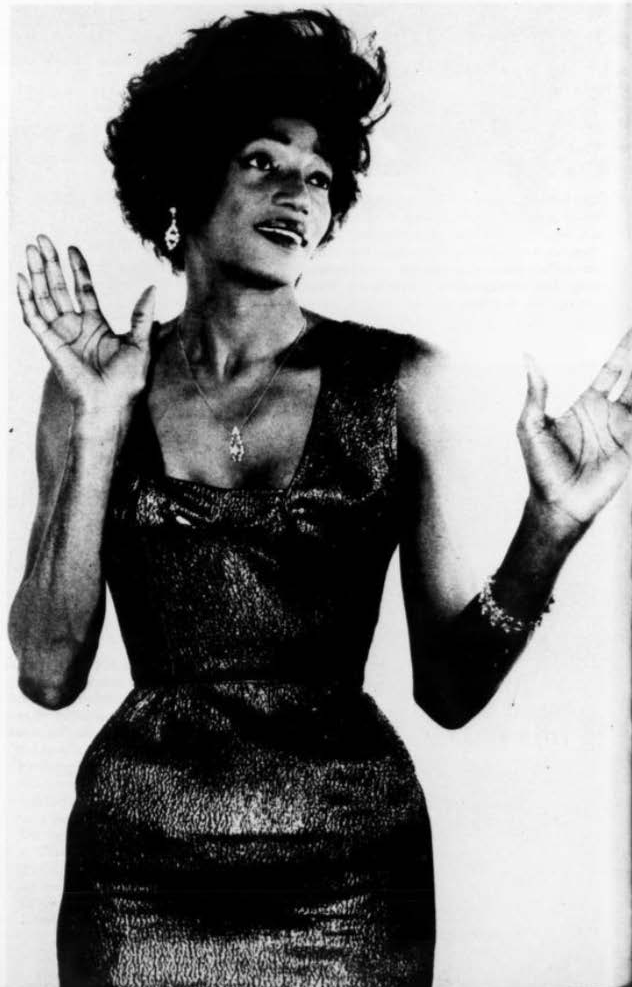
- Newton in Sepia, May 1966.
- Born: 1934; New Orleans
- Died: 2004 (aged 69–70)
- Occupations: Nurse; jazz singer

Delisa Newton (1934–2004) was an American nurse and jazz vocalist. She appeared in a 1966 issue of Sepia. She claimed to be the first African-American trans woman to receive sex reassignment surgery.

== Life ==
Born in New Orleans, her mother was of Haitian descent, and her Baptist minister father left when she was three.

Newton attended college and trained to become a nurse. When she sought gender-affirming surgery, she was turned down by multiple doctors. She also struggled to find a job that would allow her to raise money for the operation. For three years in California, she worked three jobs: she picked crops during the day, worked as a nurse at night, and sang at nightclubs on the weekends.

She underwent the first of several gender-affirming operations in March of 1963; it was the first such surgery her physician had performed. Just under two years later, she had her fifth and final operation. To celebrate, she bought herself a new car.

In a series of tabloid articles in the mid-1960s, Newton described her transition and life, as well as her personal views.

Newton died from stomach cancer in 2004. At the time of her death, she resided in Douglasville, Georgia. Newton was cremated at the request of family and her ashes were transported to Houma, Louisiana.
