= Nils Landgren (musician) =

Swedish trombone player and singer (born 1956)

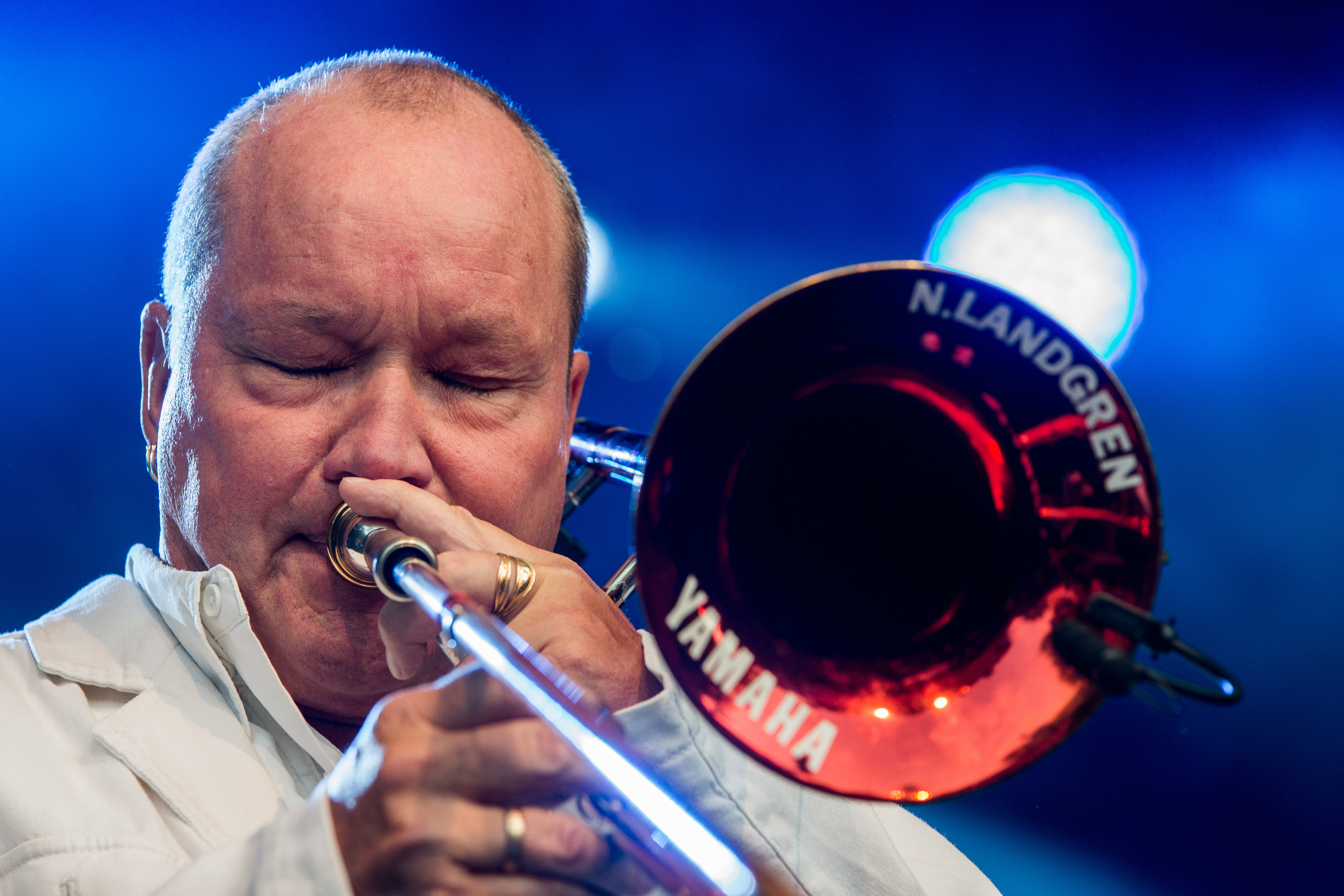
- Landgren in concert

Background information
- Born: Nils Lennart Landgren; 15 February 1956 (age 70); Degerfors, Sweden
- Genres: Jazz, R&B, funk
- Occupation: Musician
- Instrument: Trombone
- Years active: 1978–present
- Label: ACT
- Spouse: Beatrice Järås (m. 1979)
- Website: nilslandgren.com

Nils Landgren (born 15 February, 1956) is a Swedish R&B, funk, and jazz trombone player and singer. He is known as The Man with the Red Horn because he plays a red trombone.

== Early life ==
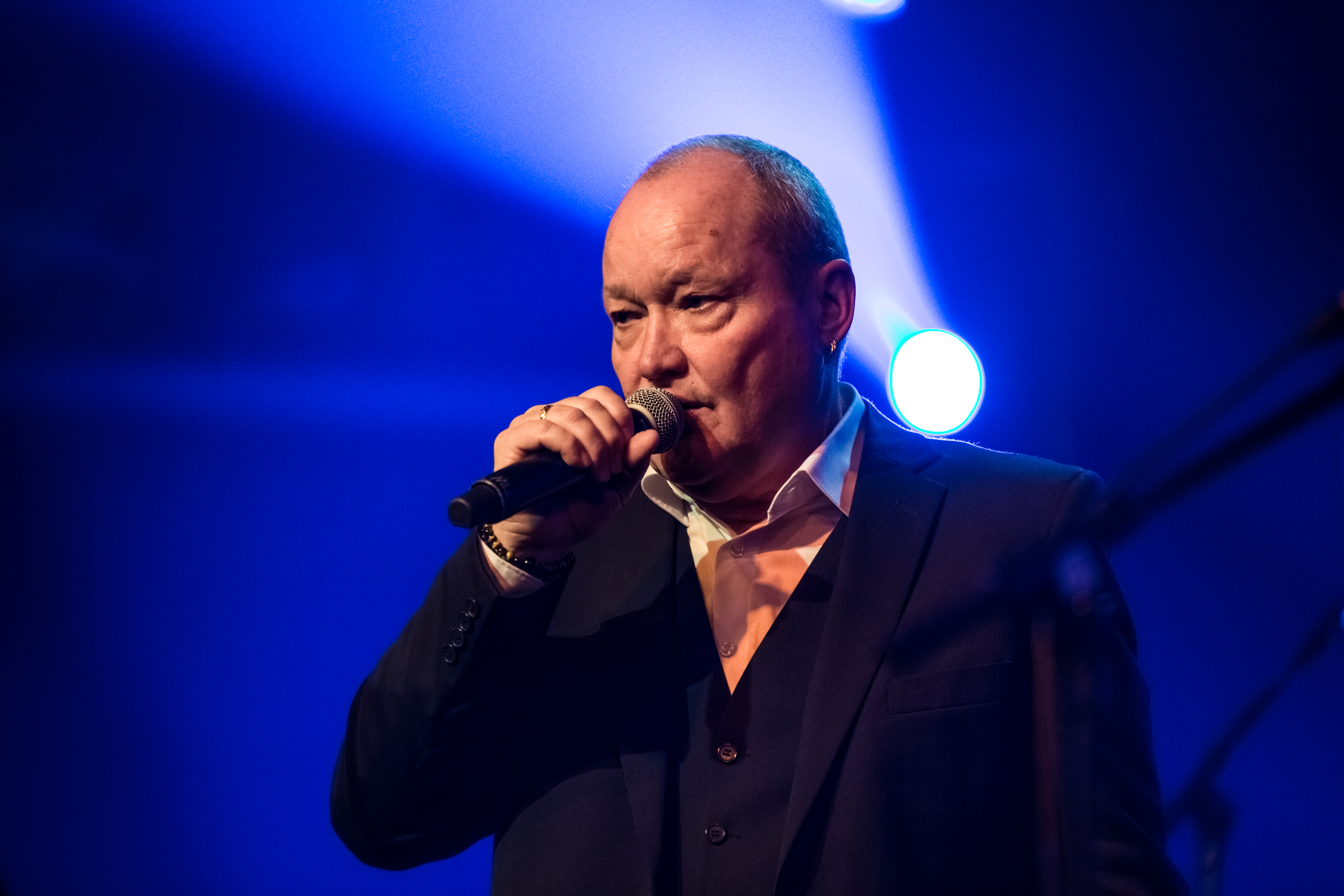
Nils Landgren live at Leverkusener Jazztage 2017

Landgren was born on 15 February 1956 in Degerfors.

== Career ==
Between 1972 and 1978 he studied classical trombone at the music college in Karlstad, Sweden, and continued his education at the university of Arvika. After meeting the Swedish folk-jazz pioneer Bengt-Arne Wallin and trombonist Eje Thelin, Landgren was persuaded to move from his strictly classical studies to improvisation and to begin developing his own sound and approach to music.

After his graduation, Landgren moved to Stockholm to work as a professional trombone player. He was soon touring with Swedish pop star Björn Skifs. Skifs's band, Blue Swede, recorded a number one hit song in the U.S. pop charts with Hooked on a Feeling. In 1981, Thad Jones invited Landgren to join his big band, called Ball of Fire, as the lead trombonist. Landgren has worked in many genres: jazz, rock, soul, hip hop, and big band. By his own reckoning, he has contributed to at least 500 albums by such international groups and musicians as ABBA, The Crusaders, Eddie Harris, Bernard "Pretty" Purdie, Wyclef Jean, and Herbie Hancock.

In 1983, he recorded and released his debut album as a solo artist, Planet Rock. It was followed by Streetfighter (1984), You're My Number One (1985), Miles from Duke (1987) with Bengt-Arne Wallin, Chapter Two 1 (1987), Chapter Two 2 and Follow Your Heart (1989). Between 1985 and 1987, Landgren performed as an actor, singer, trombonist, and dancer in over 360 performances of SKÅL, the Swedish play of the year. He has also appeared in several TV-films as an actor.

In 1992, the first performances and recordings of the Nils Landgren Unit took place. Its breakthrough beyond Scandinavia occurred in 1994 at the Jazz Baltica Festival at Salzau, Germany. The group then became the Nils Landgren Funk Unit. The album Live in Stockholm was released that year and was the foundation for the collaboration with Siegfried Loch and his then nascent label ACT Music.

In 2006, Landgren organized a Christmas with My Friends concert in the Odensala Church in Stockholm which was recorded and released as an album. It became the first album in a series. Landgren has released a new Christmas with My Friends album accompanied by a Christmas season tour in Sweden or Germany every other year.

In September 2007 Landgren opened the Jazz It Up Shanghai Jazz Festival with his band Funk Unit, playing a swing party, funk jazz show at the He Luting Concert Hall of the Shanghai Conservatory of Music.

== Personal life ==
He married Beatrice Järås in 1979.

== Awards and honors ==
- German Jazz Award for Paint It Blue, 1997
- Tore Ehrling Prize, Swedish Society of Popular Composers, 2002
- Nils Landgren receives Sir George Martin Music Award, 2012
- Order of Merit of the Federal Republic of Germany, 2019

== Selected discography ==
=== Solo albums ===
- 1983: Planet Rock (Frituna/ACT)
- 1984: Streetfighter (Frituna/ACT)
- 1985: You're My Number One (Frituna/ACT)
- 1990: Follow Your Heart (Caprice/ACT)
- 1992: Red Horn (Caprice/ACT)
- 1993: Ballads (ACT, 1993/98)
- 1996: Gotland (ACT)
- 2001: The First Unit (ACT)
- 2002: Sentimental Journey (ACT)
- 2016: Some Other Time – A Tribute to Leonard Bernstein (ACT)
- 2026: Love Of My Life (ACT)

=== Nils Landgren Funk Unit ===
- 1995: Live in Stockholm (ACT, 1994–1995), with Maceo Parker
- 1996: Paint It Blue (ACT)
- 1998: Live in Montreux (ACT)
- 1999: 5000 Miles (1999) (ACT)
- 2001: Fonk Da World (ACT)
- 2004: Funky ABBA (ACT)
- 2007: License to Funk (ACT)
- 2010: Funk for Life (ACT)
- 2013: Teamwork (ACT)
- 2014: Eternal Beauty (ACT)
- 2017: Unbreakable (ACT)
- 2021: Funk Is My Religion (ACT)

=== Collaborative works ===
- 1985: Skål! (Frituna/ACT), with Martin Ljung, Siw Malmkvist, Thomas Hellberg, Beatrice Järås, Örjan Ramberg & Sharon Dyall
- 1987: Miles from Duke (Phono Suecia/ACT), with Bengt-Arne Wallin
- 1987: Chapter Two 1 (ACT) with Johan Norberg
- 1989: Chapter Two 2 (ACT) with Johan Norberg
- 1991: Untitled Sketches (ACT), with Tomasz Stanko
- 1997: Swedish Folk Modern (ACT, 1997–98) with Esbjörn Svensson
- 2000: Layers of Light (ACT, 1999–2001), with Esbjörn Svensson
- 2003: I Will Wait For You (ACT), with Rigmor Gustafsson & Flæskekvartetten
- 2004: Close To You (ACT), with Rigmor Gustafsson & The Jacky Terrasson Trio – Celebrating Dionne Warwick
- 2005: Creole Love Call (ACT), with Joe Sample & Ray Parker Jr.
- 2005: Salzau Music on the Water (ACT), with Lars Danielsson & Christopher Dell
- 2006: Shapes (ATC), with Wolfgang Haffner, feat. Landgren & Lars Danielsson
- 2006: Christmas with My Friends (ACT) with Viktoria Tolstoy, Jeanette Köhn, Sharon Dyall, Ida Sandlund et al.
- 2008: Acoustic Shapes (ACT), with Wolfgang Haffner, feat. Landgren & Hubert Nuss
- 2008: Christmas with My Friends II (ACT), with Jeanette Köhn, Jessica Pilnäs, Sharon Dyall, Ida Sand, Jonas Knutsson, Johan Norberg & Eva Kruse
- 2009: Chapter Two (ACT), with Johan Norberg
- 2011: The Moon, the Stars and You (ACT), with Richard Galliano, Lars Danielsson, Joe Sample, Michael Wollny, Rasmus Kihlberg, Steve Gadd and Stockholm Philharmonic Orchestra
- 2012: Christmas with My Friends III (ACT), with Sharon Dyall, Jonas Knutsson, Jeanette Köhn, Eva Kruse, Jessica Pilnäs, Ida Sand, and Johan Norberg
- 2014: Christmas with My Friends IV (ACT), with Jonas Knutsson, Johan Norberg, Jeanette Köhn, Jessica Pilnäs, Sharon Dyall, Eva Kruse and Ida Sand
- 2016: Christmas with My Friends V (ACT), with Jonas Knutsson, Johan Norberg, Jeanette Köhn, Jessica Pilnäs, Sharon Dyall, Eva Kruse and Ida Sand
- 2016: Christmas with My Friends Jubilee Collection
- 2018: Christmas with My Friends VI (ACT), with Jonas Knutsson, Johan Norberg, Jeanette Köhn, Jessica Pilnäs, Sharon Dyall, Eva Kruse and Ida Sand
- 2020: Christmas with My Friends VII (ACT), with Jonas Knutsson, Johan Norberg, Jeanette Köhn, Jessica Pilnäs, Sharon Dyall, Eva Kruse and Ida Sand
- 2023: Christmas with My Friends VIII (ACT), with Jonas Knutsson, Johan Norberg, Jeanette Köhn, Jessica Pilnäs, Sharon Dyall, Eva Kruse and Ida Sand
