= Diaspora (Christian Scott album) =

Studio album by Christian Scott
- Released: June 23, 2017
- Recorded: April 16–21, 2016
- Studios: The Parlor, New Orleans, LA
- Genre: Jazz
- Length: 49:23
- Labels: Ropeadope Records RAD-365, Stretch Music
- Producers: Christian Scott aTunde Adjuah, Chris Dunn

Christian Scott chronology
Ruler Rebel (2017)	Diaspora (2017)	The Emancipation Procrastination (2017)

Professional ratings
Review scores
Source	Rating
The Arts Desk	4/5 stars
Exclaim!	9/10
Financial Times	4/5 stars
Flood Magazine	7/10
Pitchfork	7.1/10
Record Collector	4/5 stars
Tom Hull	B+

Diaspora is a studio album by American jazz trumpeter Christian Scott released on June 23, 2017, by Ropeadope Records. The album is the second installment of The Centennial Trilogy, with Ruler Rebel and The Emancipation Procrastination being the first and the third ones respectively.

== Background ==
The title Diaspora refers to the entirety of Adjuah's listening public, even though the term has specific meanings in the African-American experience, celebrating the rhythmic feels and traditions that arose from the historic movement of African peoples to the Americas and around the globe. Adjuah explains "We're trying to highlight the sameness between seemingly disparate cultures of sound as a means of showing a broader reverence and love for the people who create the sound and the experiences that lead them to those places." Jazzwise included the album in the "TOP 20 JAZZ ALBUMS OF 2017" list.

== Reception ==
Jeff Terich of Treble wrote "Diaspora, meanwhile, shifts away from some of the first installment’s darker, more hallucinatory tones. The title track alone marks a pretty dramatic transition, its laid-back trip-hop beats ushering in a more accessible, immediate sound that features a little less in the way of stylistic experimentation. Which isn’t to say there isn’t any; in fact, Diaspora is largely cut from the same cloth, albeit with results that skew a bit more toward the pop-friendly. “Desire and the Burning Girl,” for instance, is one of the album's most surreal, with a heavy dose of effects clouding Scott's horn playing as a rhythmic pulse grooves in the background. Yet there's more of a lightness about these tracks overall; “Lawless,” for instance, is by production standards a pretty hectic and dramatic track, though it's ultimately a highly melodic piece, even loungey in a way that's not so obvious." Mike Hobart of Financial Times commented, "Diaspora, released in June, emphasises group texture and the supple blend of Scott's muted trumpet with Elena Pinderhughes's flute."

Jason P. Woodbury of Flood Magazine noted "If Ruler Rebel was a NOLA-fied New Hope, thematically centered on, in part, “the return of the Demagogue,” Diaspora is the mysterious, downtempo Empire Strikes Back. Much of the record maintains this hazy, noirish hue: the fuzzy, Dilla-esque “No Love” and the John Key Jr.–penned “Uncrown Her” evoke the neo-soul of the late ’90s and early ’00s. But Scott never settles entirely into an easy groove. The complex drumming of “Lawless” keeps it from working as aural wallpaper, its constant twitching always too arresting to function as background music. Same for “Bae” and “New Jack Bounce.” Though both are labeled as interludes, they feel as engaging as the longer suites, offering rhythmic asides that punctuate the airy gauze of Scott's trumpet, which shifts from clear, bell-like tones into phased, psychedelic washes of sound."

== Track listing ==
Diaspora track listing
No.	Title	Writer(s)	Length
1.	"Diaspora" (feat. Elena Pinderhughes)	Scott, Lawrence Fields	4:57
2.	"IDK" (feat. Braxton Cook)	Scott, Lawrence Fields	4:18
3.	"Our Lady of New New Orleans (Herreast Harrison)"	Scott	3:44
4.	"Bae (Interlude)" (feat. Lawrence Fields)	Lawrence Fields	2:11
5.	"Desire and the Burning Girl"	Scott	5:36
6.	"Uncrown Her"	John Key Jr.	3:53
7.	"Lawless" (feat. Braxton Cook)	Scott, Lawrence Fields	4:00
8.	"Completely" (feat. Elena Pinderhughes)	Scott	6:19
9.	"New Jack Bounce (Interlude)" (feat. Weedie Braimah)	Scott	3:00
10.	"No Love"	Erik Bodin, Fredrik Wallin, Håkan Wirenstrand, Yukimi Nagano	6:10
11.	"The Walk"	Scott, Lawrence Fields, Sarah Elizabeth Charles	5:19
Total length:			49:23

== Personnel ==
- Christian Scott aTunde Adjuah – trumpet, siren, sirenette, reverse flugelhorn, SPD-SX, sampling, sonic architecture
- Elena Pinderhughes – flute (tracks 1 3 6 7 8 11)
- Lawrence Fields – piano, (tracks 1 2 3 4 6 7 8 10 11)
- Kris Funn – bass (tracks 1 2 6 7 8 10 11)
- Cliff Hines – guitar (tracks 1 2 3 6 8 10)
- Corey Fonville – drums, SPD-SX (tracks 1 2 3 4 6 7 10 11)
- Joe Dyson Jr. – pan-African Drums, SPD-SX (tracks 1 2 3 4 5 7 8 9 11)
- Weedie Braimah – djembe, bata, congas (tracks 1 9)
- Chief Shaka Shaka – dununba, sangban, kenikeni (tracks 1 9)
- Sarah Elizabeth Charles – special guest, vocals (track 11)

== Chart performance ==
Chart (2017)	Peak position
US Jazz Albums (Billboard)	9
