= Joe Licari =

American jazz musician

Joe Licari (born January 10, 1934, in Brooklyn, New York) is an American jazz clarinetist.

Known as an especially "hot" player with an exuberant and always emotive attack, Licari is considered, by critics and peers alike, to be in the front rank of contemporary "classic" jazz musicians.

He is also among the most immediately recognizable. The renowned Bob Wilber, with whom Licari studied for nearly a year, said of him: “You hear the influence of Benny Goodman in his playing…also the Chicago players Frank Teschemacher and Pee Wee Russell, plus the New Orleans clarinetists Johnny Dodds, Sidney Bechet and Jimmie Noone. He has used some of their ideas and rejected others to come up with his own style. To achieve [your own] identity is the goal of all serious [jazz] players. When you hear [Licari's] clarinet you know it's him.”

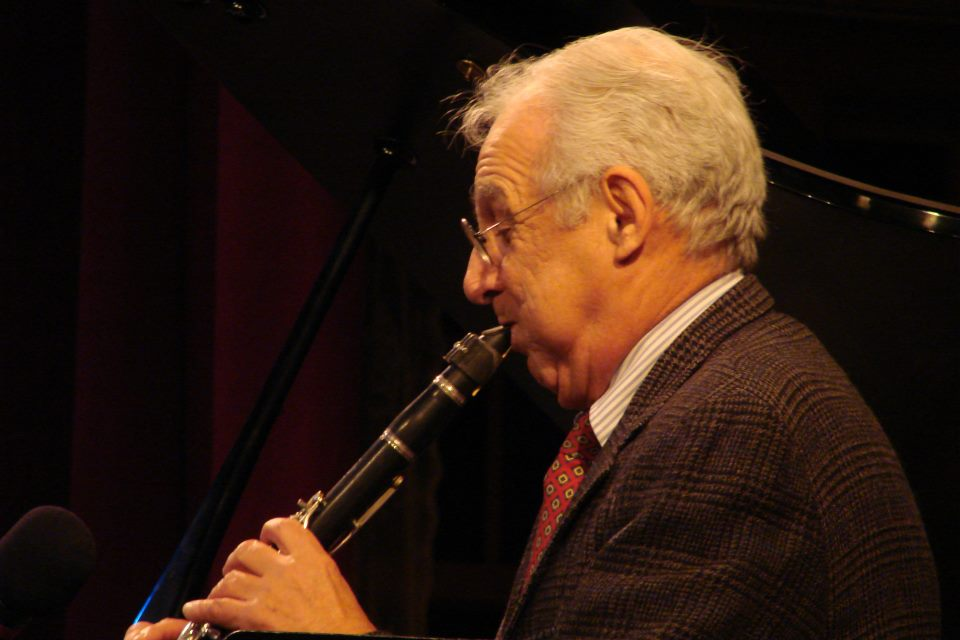
Joe Licari in concert.

In a 60 plus-year career Licari (who also plays the soprano and alto saxophones) has worked alongside Roy Eldridge, "Wild" Bill Davison, Conrad Janis, Big Chief Russell Moore, Connie Kay, Bob Haggart, Vic Dickenson, Pee Wee Erwin, Doc Cheatham and the vocalist Julie Wilson. He's also appeared in films, on The Today Show, on Jim Lowe's radio show (eight years), and in venues that have included The Algonquin, Eddie Condon's, Jimmy Ryan's and Michael's Pub (where he was a stand-in for Woody Allen).

In addition to three recordings under his leadership, Licari has been a featured player on albums by The Red Onion Jazz Band, Julie Wilson, "Big Chief" Russell Moore, Herb Gardner, Dick Voigt’s Big Apple Jazz Band, Jim Lowe, Dorothy Loudon, Betty Comora, The Grove Street Stompers (with whom he's been a prominent fixture at Arthur's Tavern in Greenwich Village on Monday nights for decades), The Speakeasy Jazz Babies, The Smith Street Society Jazz Band and Swing 39..Mark Shane. Delta Five, Jon-Erik Kellso's Hot Four, The Galvanized Jazz Band.

== Discography as Leader ==
Haunting Melody (with pianist Larry Weiss), Claril Productions
That's A Plenty, Claril Productions
Jazz Quartets, Waiting for Katy, Claril Productions
