= Thunder of the Gods =

Studio album / Live album by Sun Ra and His Arkestra
- Released: April 7, 2017
- Recorded: 1966/71
- Venue: Slug's Saloon, NYC
- Studio: NYC
- Genre: Jazz
- Length: 42:41
- Label: Modern Harmonic; MHCD-021

Sun Ra chronology
The Space Age is Here to Stay (2016)	Thunder of the Gods (2017)

Thunder of the Gods is an album by Sun Ra and His Arkestra featuring unreleased live and studio recordings, issued in April 2017 on the Modern Harmonic label.

== Reception ==
Professional ratings
Aggregate scores
Source	Rating
Metacritic	77/100
Review scores
Source	Rating
AllMusic	3.5/5 stars
Pitchfork	8.0
PopMatters	8/10 stars

Metacritic assigned album an aggregate score of 77 out of 100 based on 5 critical reviews. The AllMusic stated, "The first side is a 23-minute portion of a performance at Slug's Saloon in New York, where the Arkestra held an 18-month weekly residence. ... The other two selections on the disc are mono studio recordings taken from the same period as the Strange Strings album, so named because Ra provided the musicians with stringed instruments that they were unfamiliar with. He instructed them to start playing, but not how or what to play. As such, it's some of the most challenging music produced by the Arkestra, filled with atonal scraping, clawing, scratching, clattering, and slapping. Fascinating stuff for hardcore fans, but for most other listeners, the first half of the album is more likely to be played more than once". Pitchfork said, "This new set of unheard songs is gripping and challenging, as to be expected from the free jazz legend. Using oddball orchestrations, Sun Ra unfurls more complexities of the astral realm". PopMatters stated, "This is not music for the faint of heart or the impatient of ear, this is bold and strange and difficult, but like secondhand reports of undiscovered countries, it is impossible to comprehend what is being communicated without following to see and experience this strangeness for yourself".

== Track listing ==
All compositions by Sun Ra

1. "Calling Planet Earth – We'll Wait for You" – 23:34
2. "Moonshots Across the Sky" – 5:44
3. "Thunder of the Gods" – 13:23

== Personnel ==
- Sun Ra – Moog, Intergalactic space organ, Lightning drum, strings
- Marshall Allen – alto saxophone, oboe, piccolo flute, strings
- Ronnie Boykins – bass, viola, dutar
- Robert Cummings – strings
- Danny Davis – alto saxophone, clarinet, strings
- Akh Tal Ebar, Kwami Hadi – trumpet (track 1)
- John Gilmore – tenor saxophone, strings
- Ali Hassan – trombone, strings
- Lex Humphries – drums (track 1)
- James Jacson – oboe, flute, log drums, strings
- Clifford Jarvis – percussion
- Art Jenkins, Carl Nimrod – strings
- Eloe Omoe – bass clarinet, strings
- Pat Patrick – baritone saxophone, strings
- Danny Ray Thompson – baritone saxophone, flute (track 1)
- Charles Stevens – trombone (track 1)
- June Tyson – vocals (track 1)
- Alzo Wright – cello (track 1)
