= Bob McHugh (musician) =

American jazz musician

Bob McHugh (born Robert Ernest McHugh; July 20, 1946 in Kearny, New Jersey) is an American jazz pianist, composer and educator. He has recorded for Outstanding Records, Alliance Records, Perception Records and Lunge Music. He has performed with Ray Mantilla, Ron Naspo, Andrew Cyrille and Joe Morello. Bob was the favorite artist on Sky Jazz (2008), and Anima Jazz in Pisa, Italy (2005). He has made guest appearances on local New York radio stations. McHugh performed at the Stony Hill Inn in Hackensack, New Jersey from (1993 to 2006). He was the Commissioned composer for NJMTA state piano competition, (1998 and 1999). The National Federation of Music Clubs has included his original compositions as 'required compositions' for National Festivals (2000–2008). His compositions are on the required list for NYSSMA state festivals (2008). He has won an ASCAP grant every year since 1989, and is currently featured on ASCAP's Jazz Podcast #4. McHugh's music is published by Manduca Music Publications, and Voice of the Rockies. He has reviews published at www.jazzreview.com and www.allaboutjazz.com.

McHugh has performed at The Count Basie Theater, Red Bank, NJ, the Newark Museum, the New York Public Library and Lincoln Center. In 1985, Bob's recording of his original composition "Uptown" was added to the BBC's playlist. He was a featured performer in the documentary "The Art Of Worship" filmed at Riverside Church in New York City. He composed music for a television presentation of "The International Black Arts Festival" [1994]. He recently retired from teaching music in the New Jersey public school system where he received the role model of the year in 2012 and was then director of the West Essex Youth Jazz Band and now working as a musician and in 2017 received The Albert Nelson Marquis Lifetime Achievement Award.

== Discography ==
- Soaring on Wings of Ivory and Black (Outstanding Records, 1990)
- Manhattan Sunrise (Alliance Records, 1994)
- Interplay (Lunge Music, 1999)
- American Classics (Lunge Music, 2001)
- After Midnight (Outstanding Records, 2002)
- Another Sunrise (Outstanding Records, 2003)
- On Track (Lunge Music, 2005)
- Not Too Long Ago (Lunge Music, 2006)
- Together On a Summer Afternoon (2008)
- Summer Stride (2009]
- Pure Imagination [2010]
- Straight Ahead (2013)
- Uptown [2020]
