= 1981 in jazz =

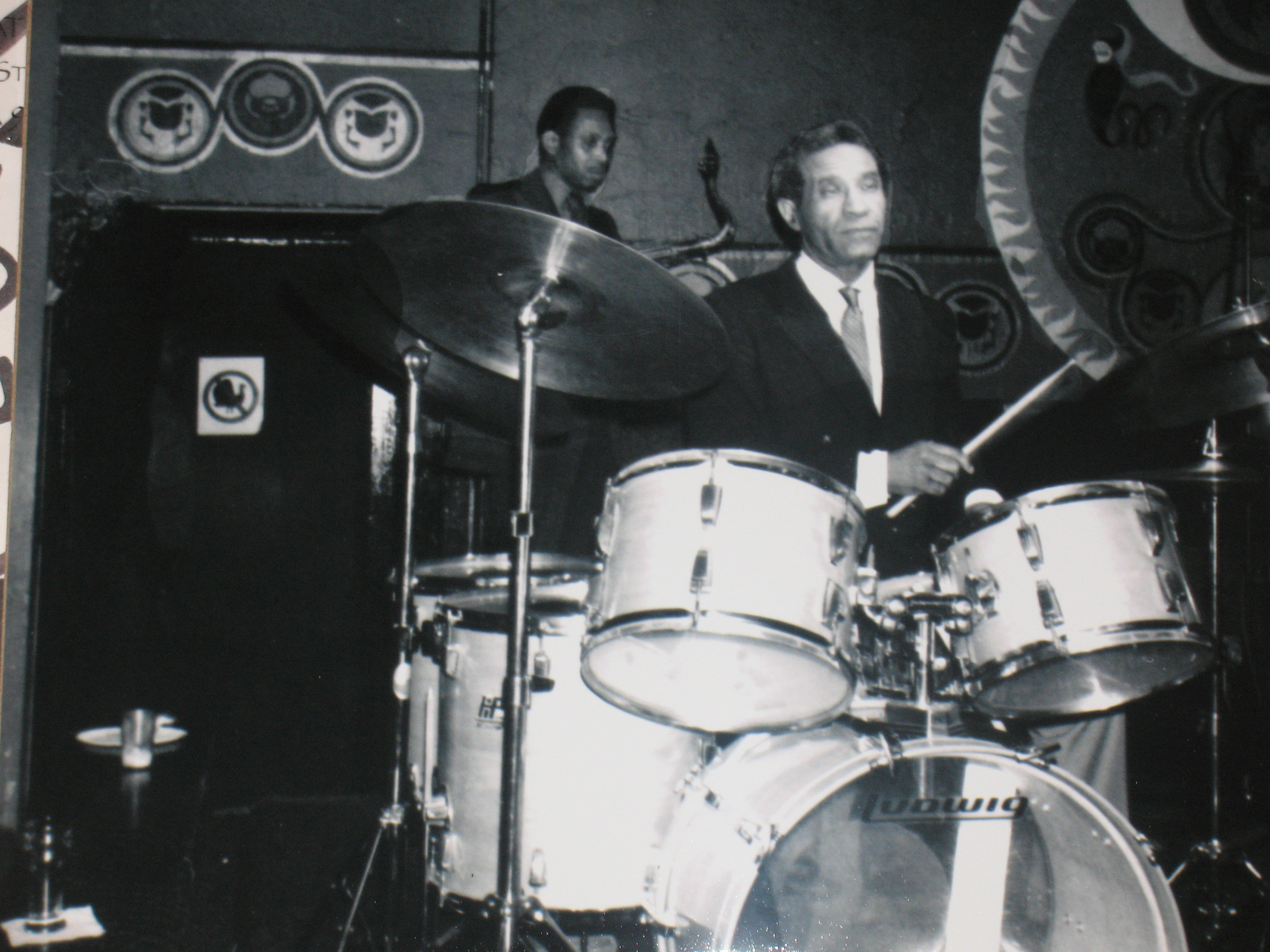
- Max Roach American Jazz Drummer with saxohonist Odeon Pope at Keystone Korner San Francisco Tuesday, February 22nd, 1981
- Decade: 1980s in jazz
- Music: 1981 in music
- Standards: List of post-1950 jazz standards
- See also: 1980 in jazz – 1982 in jazz

This is a timeline documenting events of Jazz in the year 1981.

== Events ==
=== April ===
- 10 – The 8th Vossajazz started in Vossavangen, Norway (April 10 – 12).

=== May ===
- 20 – 9th Nattjazz started in Bergen, Norway (May 20 – June 3).

=== June ===
- 2 – The 2nd Montreal International Jazz Festival started in Montreal, Quebec, Canada (July 2 – 10).
- 5 – 10th Moers Festival started in Moers, Germany (June 5 – 8).

=== July ===
- 3 – The 15th Montreux Jazz Festival started in Montreux, Switzerland (July 3 – 19).
- 10 – The 6th North Sea Jazz Festival started in The Hague, Netherlands (July 10 – 12).

=== September ===
- 18 – The 24th Monterey Jazz Festival started in Monterey, California (September 18 – 20).

== Album releases ==
- Stanley Clarke and George Duke: The Clarke/Duke Project
- Al Jarreau: Breakin' Away
- Lee Ritenour: Rit
- Ronald Shannon Jackson: Street Priest
- Jan Garbarek: Paths, Prints
- Anthony Davis: Episteme
- Joe McPhee: Topology
- Paul Motian: Psalm
- Rova Saxophone Quartet: As Was
- Marilyn Crispell: Spirit Music
- Muhal Richard Abrams: Blues Forever
- Henry Kaiser: Aloha
- Sergey Kuryokhin: The Ways of Freedom
- David Moss: Terrain
- David Murray: Home
- Frank Lowe: Skizoke
- Willem Breuker: In Holland
- Ronald Shannon Jackson: Nasty
- Billy Bang: Rainbow Gladiator
- Don Moye: Black Paladins
- Frederic Hand: Heart's Song
- Jaco Pastorius: Word of Mouth
- Joanne Brackeen: Special Identity
- Hal Russell: NRG Ensemble
- Marvin Peterson: The Angels of Atlanta
- Oscar Peterson: Nigerian Marketplace
- Saheb Sarbib: Aisha
- Steve Douglas: Rainbow Suite
- Steve Khan: Eyewitness
- Wynton Marsalis: Wynton Marsalis
- Keith Tippett: Mujician
- Larry Carlton: Strikes Twice
- Pharoah Sanders: Rejoice

== Deaths ==
January

- 9 – Cozy Cole, American drummer (born 1909).
- 21 – Russell Procope, American clarinettist and alto saxophonist (born 1908).

February

- 23 – Shep Fields, American bandleader, clarinetist, and tenor saxophonist (born 1910).
- 28 – Jean Robert, Belgian saxophonist (born 1908).

March

- 5 – Red Saunders, American drummer and bandleader (born 1912).
- 20 – Sonny Red, American alto saxophonist (born 1932).

April

- 3 – Polo Barnes, American clarinetist and saxophonist (born 1901).
- 29 – Cat Anderson, American trumpeter (born 1916).

May

- 12 – Frank Weir, British orchestra leader and saxophonist (born 1911).
- 25 – Georg Malmstén, Finnish singer, musician, composer, orchestra conductor, and actor (born 1902).
- 28 – Mary Lou Williams, African-American pianist and composer (born 1910).

July

- 21 – Snub Mosley, American trombonist (born 1905).

August

- 3 – Seymour Österwall, Swedish tenor saxophonist, bandleader, and composer (born 1908).
- 4 – Tommy Turk, American trombonist (born 1927).
- 24 – Bill Coleman, American trumpeter (born 1904).

September

- 9
  - Fernand Coppieters, Belgian pianist and organist (born 1905).
  - Helen Humes, American singer (born 1913).
- 13 – Bob Bates, American upright bassist (born 1923).

December

- 15 – Samuel Jones, American upright bassist, cellist and composer (born 1924).
- 17 – Roy McCloud, American cornetist (born 1909).
- 27 – Hoagy Carmichael, American composer, pianist, singer, actor, and bandleader (born 1899).

== Births ==
January

- 18 – Martin Taxt, Norwegian tubist.

February

- 18 – Kamasi Washington, American saxophonist, composer, producer, and bandleader.
- 20 – Chris Thile, American mandolinist, singer, songwriter, composer, and radio personality.
- 24 – Gwilym Simcock, British pianist and composer.

March

- 10
  - Elina Duni, Albanian singer and composer.
  - Lars Horntveth, Norwegian multi-instrumentalist, band leader, and composer.
- 13 – Ivo Neame, British pianist, saxophonist, and composer, Phronesis.

April

- 3 – Erik Nylander, Swedish drummer, improviser, and composer, Magic Pocket.
- 27 – Hilde Marie Kjersem, Norwegian singer and songwriter.

May

- 3 – Alexander Hawkins, British pianist, bandleader, and composer.
- 19 – Dan Forshaw, English saxophonist and educator.
- 20 – Carmen Souza, Portuguese singer and songwriter of Cape Verdean heritage.

June

- 3 – Sam Amidon, American singer and songwriter.
- 16 – Ola Kvernberg, Norwegian violinist and composer.

July

- 13
  - Olavi Louhivuori, Finnish drummer and composer.
  - Sigurd Hole, Norwegian upright bassist, Eple Trio.
- 21 – Paloma Faith, English singer, songwriter, and actress.

August

- 8 – Maria Ylipää, Finnish singer and actress.
- 14 – Thomas Morgan, American upright bassist and cellist.
- 16 – Øystein Moen, Norwegian pianist and keyboarder.
- 26 – Gwyneth Herbert, British singer-songwriter, composer, multi-instrumentalist, and record producer.

September

- 3 – Jørgen Munkeby, Norwegian multi-instrumentalist and singer.

October

- 18 – Sarah Buechi, Swiss singer.
- 20 – Kaori Kobayashi, Japanese saxophonist and flautist.
- 24 – Fredrik Mikkelsen, Norwegian guitarist and composer.
- 26 – Erlend Slettevoll, Norwegian pianist, Grand General.

December

- 17 – Kim Myhr, Norwegian guitarist and composer, Trondheim Jazz Orchestra.
- 18 – Maciej Obara, Polish saxophonist.

Unknown date

- Anders Thorén, Swedish drummer.
- Andy Davies, Welsh trumpeter.
- Ivar Loe Bjørnstad, Norwegian drummer.

== See also ==
- 1980s in jazz
- List of years in jazz
- 1981 in music
