= 1922 in jazz =

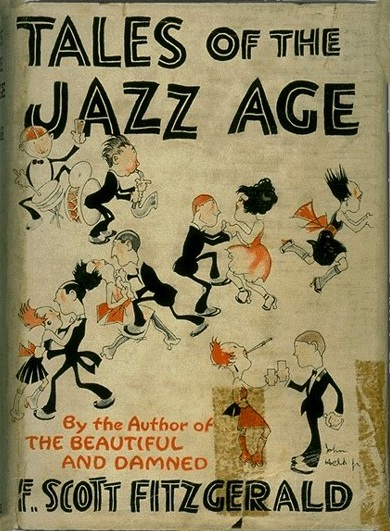
- Cover of a 1922 edition of F. Scott Fitzgerald's book Tales of the Jazz Age
- Decade: 1920s in jazz
- Music: 1922 in music
- Standards: List of 1920s jazz standards
- See also: 1921 in jazz – 1923 in jazz

This is a timeline documenting events of Jazz in the year 1922.

Musicians born that year included Carmen McRae and Charles Mingus.

== Jazz scene ==
In 1922, the Jazz Age was well underway. Chicago and New York City were becoming the most important centres for jazz, and jazz was becoming very profitable for jazz managers such as Paul Whiteman . Whiteman by 1922 managed some 28 different jazz ensembles on the East Coast of the United States, earning over a $1,000,000 in 1922.

Despite its popularity, as a form of music Jazz was still not appreciated by many critics, including Anne Faulkner who passed off jazz as "a destructive dissonance", asking if the music "put the sin in syncopation" and Henry van Dyke who described jazz as "an unmitigated cacophony, a species of music invented by demons for the torture of imbeciles".

Chicago in 1922 in particular was attracting bands such as Joe "King" Oliver's Creole Jazz Band at the Lincoln Gardens, joined by Louis Armstrong on August 8, 1922, and the Austin High Gang featuring Frank Teschemacher (clarinet), Jimmy McPartland (cornet), Richard McPartland (guitar and banjo) and Lawrence "Bud" Freeman (saxophone) who began playing at the Friar's Inn in Chicago. Meanwhile, on the New York scene, Duke Ellington arrived in New York City with Sonny Greer and banjo player Elmer Snowden and met his idol James P. Johnson, Fats Waller who had begun to make a name for himself with his piano rolls and Willie "The Lion" Smith.Coleman Hawkins, already well noted for his high level of profiency joined Mamie Smith's Jazz Hounds and were later hired in New York by Fletcher Henderson.

Jazz began to emerge in the Soviet Union with the "First Eccentric Orchestra of the Russian Federated Socialist Republic – Valentin Parnakh's Jazz Band".

== Standards ==
- Standards published in 1922 included "Bugle Call Rag" and "Farewell Blues".

== Births ==
January

- 3 – Geezil Minerve, Cuban-born alto saxophonist and flautist (died 1992).
- 4
  - Arvid Gram Paulsen, Norwegian saxophonist and trumpeter (died 1963).
  - Frank Wess, American saxophonist and flautist (died 2013).
- 15 – Thelma Carpenter, American singer and actress (died 1997).
- 16 – Lina Romay, Mexican-American actress and singer (died 2010).
- 18 – Johnny Costa, American pianist (died 1996).
- 20 – Ray Anthony, American bandleader, trumpeter, songwriter and actor.
- 25 – Jimmy Wyble, American guitarist (died 2010).
- 26 – Page Cavanaugh, American pianist and singer (died 2008).
- 29 – Jack Sels, Belgian saxophonist (died 1970).

February

- 6 – Conrad Gozzo, American trumpeter (died 1964).
- 11 – Bob Carter, American bassist and arranger (died 1993).
- 14 – Pauline Braddy, African-American drummer, International Sweethearts of Rhythm (died 1996).
- 19 – Martin Slavin, British composer (died 1988).
- 22
  - Joe Wilder, American trumpeter (died 2014).
  - Virtue Hampton Whitted, American singer and bassist (died 2007).
- 23 – John Carisi, American trumpeter and composer (died 1992).

March

- 2
  - Eddie "Lockjaw" Davis, American tenor saxophonist (died 1986).
  - Joe Morris, American trumpeter (died 1958).
- 19 – David "Buck" Wheat, American bassist (died 1975).
- 20 – Larry Elgart, American band leader (died 2017).
- 24 – King Pleasure, American singer (died 1982).

April

- 1 – Duke Jordan, American pianist (died 2006).
- 8 – Carmen McRae, American singer, pianist and composer (died 1994).
- 17 – Paul Smith, American pianist (died 2013).
- 19 – Glauco Masetti, Italian jazz reedist (died 2001).
- 21 – Mundell Lowe, American guitarist, composer, and conductor (died 2017).
- 22
  - Charles Mingus, American upright bassist and pianist (died 1979).
  - Lou Stein, American pianist (died 2002).
- 24 – Aaron Bell, American upright bassist (died 2003).
- 26 – Dorothy Donegan, American pianist (died 1998).
- 27 – Tale Ognenovski, Macedonian multi-instrumentalist (died 2012).
- 29 – Toots Thielemans, Belgian and American harmonica player and guitarist (died 2016).

May

- 1 – Floyd "Candy" Johnson, American saxophonist (died 1981).
- 4 – King Fleming, American pianist and bandleader (died 2014).
- 5 – Monica Lewis, American singer and actress (died 2015).
- 12 – Gerald Wiggins, pianist and organist (died 2008).
- 15 – James Buffington, American hornist (died 1981).
- 16 – Eddie Bert, American trombonist (died 2012).
- 18 – Kai Winding, Danish-born American trombonist (died 1983).
- 19 – Terry Devon, British singer (died 2013).
- 29 – Bubba Brooks, American tenor saxophonist (died 2002).

June

- 5 – Specs Powell, drummer (died 2007).
- 7 – Beryl Booker, American swing pianist (died 1978).
- 9 – Gösta Theselius, Swedish arranger, composer, film scorer, pianist, and saxophonist (died 1976).
- 15 – Jaki Byard, American multi-instrumentalist (died 1999).
- 19
  - David van Kriedt, saxophonist (died 1994).
  - Mousey Alexander, American drummer (died 1988).
- 24 – Manny Albam, baritone saxophonist (died 2001).
- 25 – Johnny Smith, American guitarist (died 2013).
- 29 – Ralph Burns, American pianist, composer, and arranger (died 2001).

July

- 5 – Bruce Turner, English saxophonist, clarinetist, and bandleader (died 1993).
- 6 – Jiří Jelínek, Czech trumpeter and singer (died 1984).
- 17 – Danny Bank, American saxophonist, clarinetist, and flautist (died 2010).
- 20
  - Ernie Wilkins, American saxophonist (died 1999).
  - Karel Krautgartner, Czech clarinetist and saxophonist (died 1982).
- 21 – Kay Starr, American singer (died 2016).

August

- 1 – Charles W. LaRue, American trombonist (died 2006).
- 2 – Big Nick Nicholas, American saxophonist and singer (died 1997).
- 4 – Earl Swope, American trombonist (died 1968).
- 17
  - Arv Garrison, American guitarist (died 1960).
  - Jack Sperling, American drummer (died 2004).
- 29 – Rolf Ericson, Swedish trumpeter and flugelhornist (died 1997)

September

- 7 – Joe Newman, American trumpeter (died 1992).
- 15 – Harry Betts, American trombonist (died 2012).
- 24 – Jack Costanzo, American percussionist (died 2018).
- 28 – Linda Vogt, Australian flautist (died 2013).
- 30 – Oscar Pettiford, American upright bassist, cellist and composer (died 1960).

October

- 3 – Von Freeman, American tenor saxophonist (died 2012).
- 4 – Stan Hasselgård, Swedish clarinetist (died 1948)
- 5 – Jim Godbolt, English jazz historian and journalist (died 2013)
- 15 – Lorraine Gordon, American jazz music advocate, Village Vanguard jazz club (died 2018).
- 29 – Neal Hefti, American trumpeter and composer (died 2008).
- 30 – Illinois Jacquet, American tenor saxophonist (died 2004).
- 31 – Ted Nash, American saxophonist, flautist, and clarinetist (died 2011).

November

- 4 – Ralph Sutton, American pianist (died 2001).
- 7 – Al Hirt, American trumpeter and bandleader (died 1999).
- 12 – Lou Blackburn, American trombonist (died 1990).
- 29 – Bobby Donaldson, American drummer (died 1971).

December

- 8 – Sol Yaged, American clarinetist (died 2019).
- 14 – Cecil Payne, American baritone saxophonist (died 2007).
- 18 – Big Miller, American singer and bassist (died 1992).
