= 1971 in jazz =

- Decade: 1970s in jazz
- Music: 1971 in music
- Standards: List of post-1950 jazz standards
- See also: 1970 in jazz – 1972 in jazz

This is a timeline documenting events of Jazz in the year 1971.

== Events ==
=== May ===
- 2 – The 5th Montreux Jazz Festival started in Montreux, Switzerland (May 2 – June 24).

=== July ===
- 2 – The 18th Newport Jazz Festival started in Newport, Rhode Island (July 2 – 5).

=== September ===
- 17 – The 14th Monterey Jazz Festival started in Monterey, California (September 17 – 19).

== Album releases ==
- Art Ensemble of Chicago: Phase One
- Derek Bailey: Solo Guitar
- Gato Barbieri: Fenix
- Carla Bley: Escalator Over The Hill
- Willem Breuker: Instant Composers Pool 008
- Gary Burton: Live in Tokyo
- Alice Coltrane
  - Universal Consciousness
  - Journey in Satchidananda
- Compost: Compost
- Chick Corea
  - Circle 2: Gathering
  - Piano Improvisations
  - The Song of Singing
- Don Ellis: Tears of Joy
- Bill Evans
  - The Bill Evans Album
  - From Left to Right
- Jan Garbarek: Sart
- Freddie Hubbard
  - First Light
  - Sing Me a Song of Songmy
  - Straight Life
- Keith Jarrett
  - Birth
  - Gary Burton & Keith Jarrett
  - The Mourning of a Star
- Mahavishnu Orchestra: The Inner Mounting Flame
- Joe McPhee: Trinity
- Oliver Nelson: Swiss Suite
- Jean-Luc Ponty: Open Strings
- Terje Rypdal: Terje Rypdal
- Pharoah Sanders: Black Unity
- Spontaneous Music Ensemble: So What Do You Think
- Keith Tippett: Septober Energy
- Stanley Turrentine: Salt Song
- Weather Report: Weather Report
- Tim Weisberg: Tim Weisberg
- Mike Westbrook: Metropolis
- Paul Winter
  - Icarus
  - Road
- Joe Zawinul: Zawinul

== Deaths ==
January

- 10 – Ernie Caceres, American saxophonist (born 1911).
- 19 – Harry Shields, American clarinetist (born 1899).

February

- 1 – Harry Roy, British clarinettist and bandleader (born 1900).
- 5 – Chas Remue, Belgian reedist (born 1903).
- 11 – Harry Arnold, Swedish saxophonist and bandleader (born 1920).
- 22 – Derek Humble, English alto saxophonist (born 1930).

March

- 26 – Harold McNair, Jamaican-born saxophonist and flute player (lung cancer) (born 1931).
- 28 – Morey Feld, American drummer (born 1915).

April

- 1 – Baby Face Willette, American Hammond organist (born 1933).
- 12 – Wynton Kelly, Jamaican pianist and composer (born 1931).
- 28 – Sonny White, American pianist (born 1917).

May

- 8 – Gus Deloof, Belgian trumpeter, composer, and arranger (born 1909).

June

- 11 – Bert Ambrose, English bandleader and violinist (born 1896).

July

- 2 – Bobby Donaldson, American drummer (born 1922).
- 6 – Louis Armstrong, American singer and trumpeter (born 1901).
- 8 – Charlie Shavers, American trumpeter (born 1920).

August

- 13 – King Curtis, American saxophonist (born 1934).
- 17 – Tab Smith, American saxophonist (born 1909).
- 27 – Lil Hardin Armstrong, American pianist, singer, and band leader (born 1898).
- 28 – Lou McGarity, American trombonist, violinist, and vocalist (born 1917).

November

- 1 – Irene Daye, American singer (born 1918).
- 3 – Gary McFarland, American composer, arranger, vibraphonist, and vocalist (born 1933).

Unknown date

- Gregor or Krikor Kélékian, Armenian-French bandleader (born 1898).

== Births ==
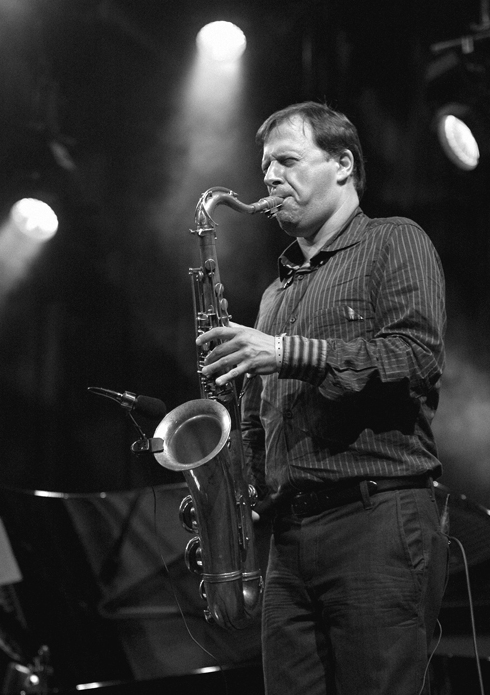
Chris Potter at the North Sea Jazz Festival.

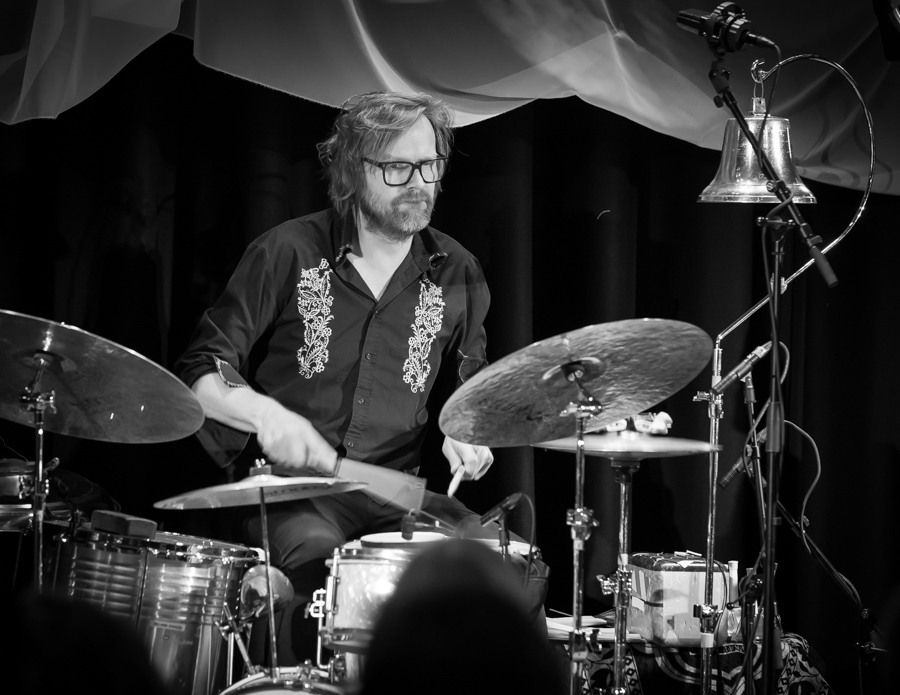
Erland Dahlen at Sentralen, Oslo Jazzfestival.

January

- 1
  - Chris Potter, American saxophonist.
  - Kenya Hathaway, American singer.
- 4 – Nigel Hitchcock, English saxophonist.
- 5 – Stian Carstensen, Norwegian multi-instrumentalist.
- 20 – Zoe Rahman, English pianist and composer.

February

- 16 – Øyvind Brandtsegg, Norwegian percussionist.
- 26 – Erykah Badu, American singer-songwriter, record producer, disc jockey, activist, and actress.

March

- 23 – Leszek Możdżer, Polish pianist, music producer, and film music composer.

April

- 2 – Solveig Slettahjell, Norwegian singer.
- 10 – Joey Defrancesco, American organist, trumpeter, and vocalist.
- 16 – Max Beesley, English actor, singer, and pianist.
- 25 – Trygve Seim, Norwegian saxophonist.
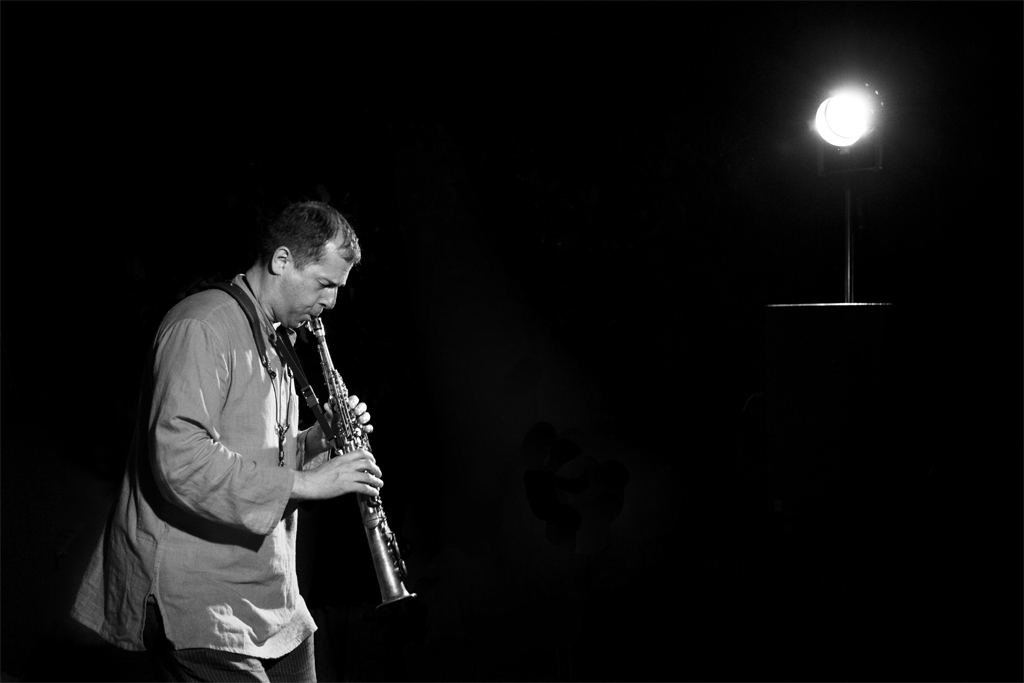
  Arun Luthra performing at the 2018 Tramonto Festival in Croatia
- 26 – Christian Wallumrød, Norwegian pianist and composer.

May

- 6 – Till Brönner, German trumpeter, singer, composer, arranger, and producer.
- 12 – Kristin Asbjørnsen, Norwegian singer and composer.
- 15 – Erland Dahlen, Norwegian drummer and percussionist.
- 31 – Arun Luthra, Indo-Anglo-American saxophonist, konnakol artist, composer, arranger, and band leader.

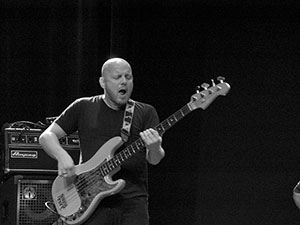
Ingebrigt Håker Flaten 2014.

June

- 4 – Shoji Meguro, Japanese composer, guitarist, and director.
- 7
  - Håvard Fossum, Norwegian saxophonistand flautist.
  - Jesse Green, American pianist, composer, arranger, and record producer.
- 9 – Gerald Preinfalk, Austrian saxophonist, clarinetist, and composer.
- 15 – Nasheet Waits, American drummer.
- 29 – Ingar Zach, Norwegian percussionist.

July

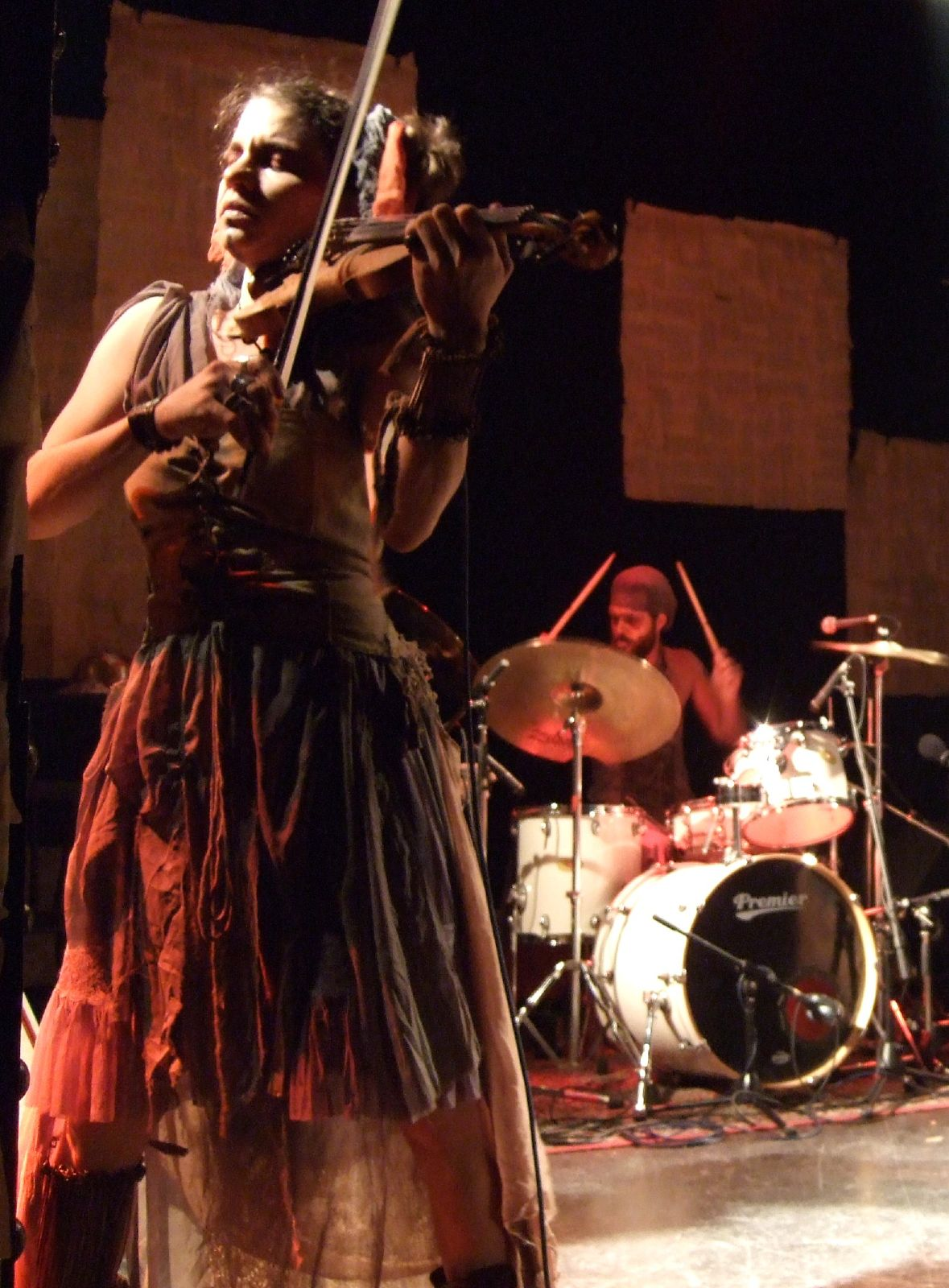
Carla Kihlstedt 2007.

- 17 – Liberty Ellman, American guitarist.
- 29 – Lisa Ekdahl, Swedish singer and songwriter.

August

- 14 – Walter Blanding, American saxophonist and clarinetist.
- 17 – Ed Motta, Brazilian singer and keyboardist.

September

- 15 – Graham Wood, Australian jazz pianist (died 2017).
- 20 – Sean J. Kennedy, American drummer.
- 23 – Ingebrigt Håker Flaten, Norwegian bassist.

October

- 19 – Helén Eriksen, Norwegian saxophonist and singer.
- 20 – Russell Gunn, American trumpeter.
- 24 – Frode Berg, Norwegian bassist.
- 26 – Vijay Iyer, American pianist and composer.

November

- 1 – Antonio Sánchez, Mexican-American drummer and composer.
- 4 – Gregory Porter, American vocalist.
- 28 – Robert Mitchell, British pianist, composer, and teacher.

December

- 1 – Mika Pohjola, Finnish pianist and composer.
- 11 – Mattias Ståhl, Swedish vibraphonist, clarinetist, and composer.
- 18 – Noriko Matsueda, Japanese pianist and composer.

Unknown date

- Carla Kihlstedt, American composer, violinist, vocalist, and multi-instrumentalist.
- Dominique Atkins, British singer, Grace.
- Kasper Tranberg, Danish trumpeter and flugelhornist.
- Marcus Johnson, American keyboardist.
- Tom Norris, English musician, composer, ensemble leader, and songwriter.
- Vellu Halkosalmi, Finnish trombonist and composer.

== See also ==
- 1970s in jazz
- List of years in jazz
- 1971 in music
