= 1976 in jazz =

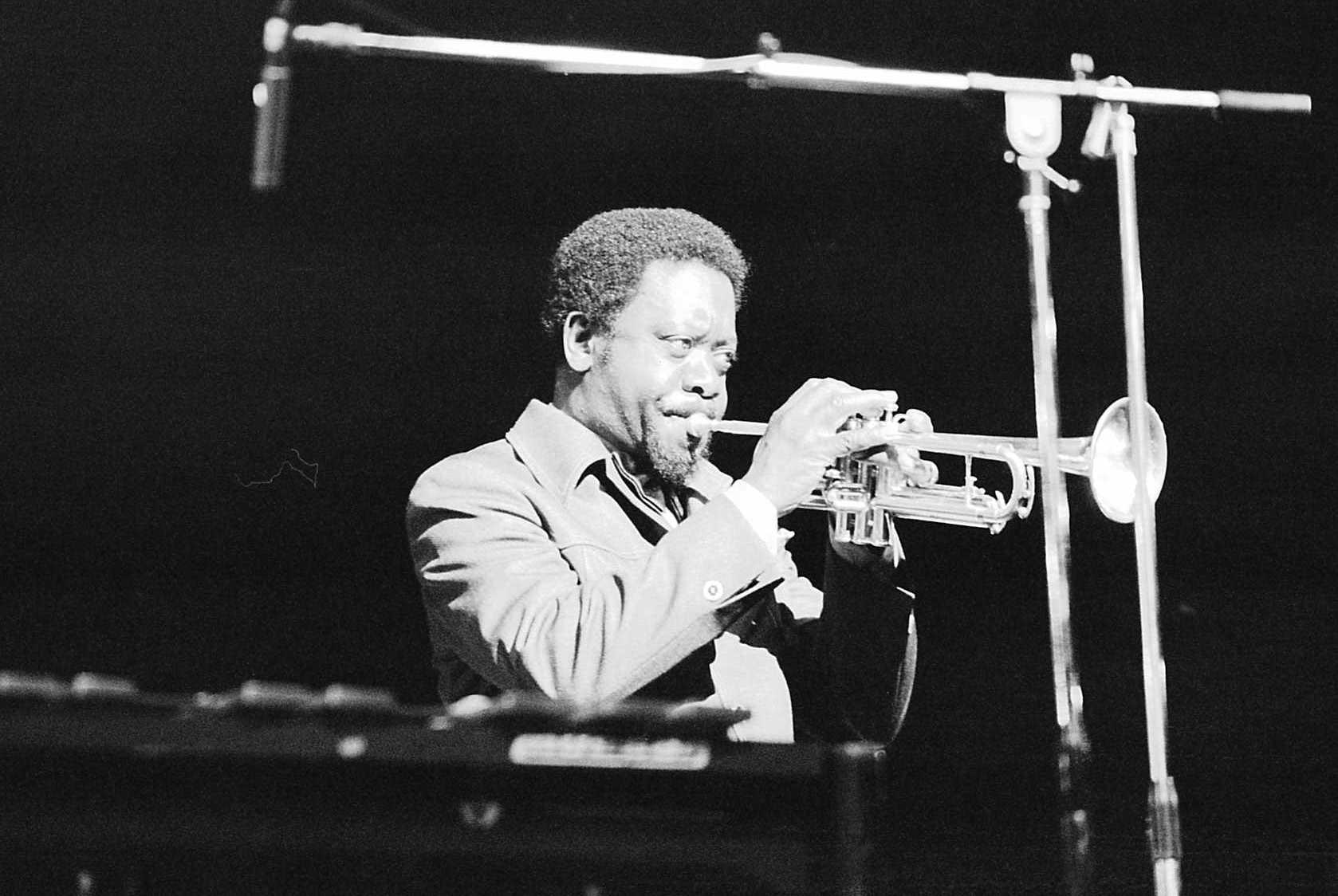
- Wallace Davenport at the 1976 North Sea Jazz Festival
- Decade: 1970s in jazz
- Music: 1976 in music
- Standards: List of post-1950 jazz standards
- See also: 1975 in jazz – 1977 in jazz

This is a timeline documenting events of Jazz in the year 1976.

== Events ==
=== April ===
- 9 – The 3rd Vossajazz started in Vossavangen, Norway (April 9 – 11).

=== May ===
- 19 – The 4th Nattjazz started in Bergen, Norway (May 19 – June 2).

=== June ===
- 4 – The 5th Moers Festival started in Moers, Germany (June 4 – 7).
- 25
  - The 23rd Newport Jazz Festival started in New York, New York (June 25 – July 5).
  - The 10th Montreux Jazz Festival started in Montreux, Switzerland (June 25 – July 11).

=== July ===
- 16 – The very first North Sea Jazz Festival started in The Hague, Netherlands (July 16 – 18).

=== September ===
- 17 – The 19th Monterey Jazz Festival started in Monterey, California (September 17 – 19).

== Album releases ==
- George Lewis: Solo Trombone Record
- Air: Air Raid
- David Murray: Flowers for Albert
- Derek Bailey: Company 1
- Jan Garbarek: Dansere
- Toshiko Akiyoshi: Road Time
- Albert Mangelsdorff: Tromboneliness
- Tony Coe: Zeitgeist
- Jaco Pastorius: Jaco Pastorius
- Martial Solal: Movability
- George Finola: New Orleans After Hours
- Hamiet Bluiett: Endangered Species
- Art Lande: Rubisa Patrol
- Return to Forever: Romantic Warrior
- George Adams: Suite For Swingers
- Jean-Luc Ponty: Imaginary Voyage
- David Friesen: Star Dance
- Joachim Kuhn: Springfever
- Eberhard Weber: The Following Morning
- Lew Tabackin: Dual Nature
- Chico Freeman: Morning Prayer
- Weather Report: Black Market
- Charles Tyler: Saga of the Outlaws
- Al Di Meola: Land of The Midnight Sun
- Woody Shaw: Love Dance
- Stanley Clarke: School Days
- Yosuke Yamashita: Banslikana
- Ran Blake: Wende
- Guenter Christmann: Solomusiken Fuer Posaune und Kontrabasse
- Egberto Gismondi: Corações futuristas
- Hugh Masekela: Colonial Man
- Hugh Masekela: Melody Maker
- Ryo Fukui: Scenery
- Pat Metheny: Bright Size Life

== Deaths ==
January

- 14 – Juan d'Arienzo, Argentine tango violinist, band leader, and composer (born 1900).
- 24 – Gösta Theselius, Swedish arranger, composer, film scorer, pianist, and saxophonist (born 1922).
- 28 – Ray Nance, American trumpeter, violinist and singer (born 1913).

February

- 5 – Rudy Pompilli, American tenor saxophonist, Bill Haley and His Comets (born 1924).
- 6 – Vince Guaraldi, American pianist (born 1928).
- 12 – Skip Martin, American jazz saxophonist, clarinetist, and music arranger (born 1916).

March

- 14 – Junior Collins, American French horn player (born 1927).
- 18 – Jim McCartney, English trumpeter and pianist (born 1902).
- 19 – Paul Kossoff, English guitarist (cerebral and pulmonary oedema), Free (born 1950).
- 26 – Duster Bennett, British singer and guitarist (car accident), Fleetwood Mac (born 1946).

May

- 14 – Keith Relf, English singer (cardiac arrest due to electrocution), The Yardbirds (born 1940).
- 17 – Lars Gullin, Swedish saxophonist (born 1928).
- 29 – Willie Maiden, American saxophonist and arranger (born 1928).
- 30 – Rube Bloom, Jewish-American songwriter, pianist, arranger, band leader, singer, and author (born 1902).

April

- 7 – Jimmy Garrison, American upright bassist (born 1934).
- 12 – Ted Buckner, American saxophonist (born 1913).

June

- 7 – Bobby Hackett, American trumpeter, cornetist, and guitarist (born 1915).

July

- 10 – Mike Pratt, English actor, musician, songwriter, and screenwriter (born 1931).
- 12 – Buddy Featherstonhaugh, English saxophonist (born 1909).

September

- 8 – August Agbola O'Browne, Nigerian-Polish drummer (born 1895).

October

- 3
  - Victoria Spivey, American singer and songwriter (born 1906).
  - Herb Flemming, American trombonist and vocalist (born 1898).
- 11 – Connee Boswell, American singer (born 1907).

December

- 4 – Tommy Bolin, American guitarist (drug-induced suffocation), Deep Purple (born 1951).
- 28 – Freddie King, American guitarist and singer (born 1934).

== Births ==
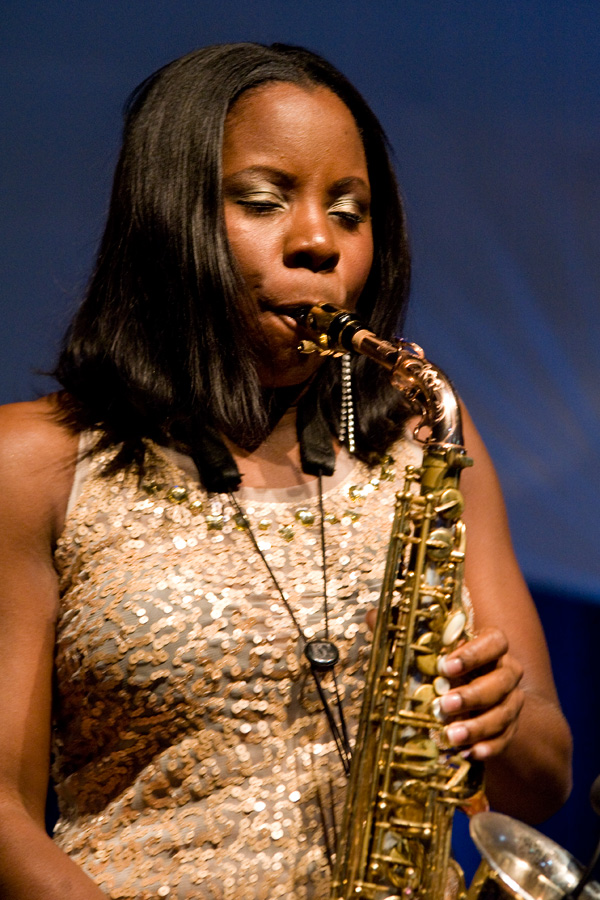
Tia Fuller 2011.

January

- 10 – Freddy Wike, Norwegian drummer.
- 23 – Harmen Fraanje, Dutch pianist and composer.

February

- 11 – Gretchen Parlato, American singer.
- 20 – Ben Wendel, Canadian-American saxophonist, composer, bassoonist, and pianist, Kneebody.
- 22 – Julia Biel, British singer, songwriter, pianist, and multi-instrumentalist.
- 26 – Karl Strømme, Norwegian trumpeter.

March

- 1 – Andreas Mjøs, Norwegian vibraphonist, percussionist, guitarist, record producer, and composer, Jaga Jazzist.
- 10 – Ane Brun, singer and songwriter.
- 16 – Erlend Jentoft, Norwegian saxophonist and composer.
- 27 – Tia Fuller, American saxophonist, composer, and educator.

April

- 10 – Jan Werner Danielsen, Norwegian singer (died 2006).
- 17 – Kjetil Steensnæs, Norwegian guitarist.
- 30 – Radek Nowicki, Polish saxophonist.

May

- 10 – Torbjörn Zetterberg, Swedish upright bassist and composer.
- 20 – Ferenc Nemeth, Hungarian drummer and composer.

June

- 3
  - Hilde Louise Asbjørnsen, Norwegian singer, songwriter, cabaret artist.
  - Roger Arntzen, Norwegian upright bassist, In The Country.
- 6 – Emilie-Claire Barlow, Canadian singer and voice actress.
- 10 – Kinan Azmeh, Syrian clarinetist.
- 17 – Kjetil Møster, Norwegian reedist and composer, The Core and Ultralyd.
- 21 – Jarle Bernhoft, Norwegian singer, multi-instrumentalist, composer, and lyricist.

July

- 7
  - Erja Lyytinen, Finnish guitarist and singer-songwriter.
  - Orlando le Fleming, English upright bassist, composer and former cricketer, OWL Trio.

August

- 6 – Jonas Westergaard, Danish upright bassist.

September

- 4 – Alex Pangman, Canadian singer.
- 15 – Femi Temowo, Nigerian-born British jazz guitarist, musical director, producer and broadcaster.

October

- 1 – Ivar Grydeland, Norwegian guitarist and composer.
- 7 – Pekka Kuusisto, Finnish violinist.
- 19 – Jostein Gulbrandsen, Norwegian guitarist and composer.
- 28 – Emma Salokoski, Finnish singer, composer, and writer.

November

- 8 – Eric Harland, American drummer.

December

- 6 – Ole Børud, Norwegian singer, songwriter and multi-instrumentalist.
- 7 – Kresten Osgood, Danish drummer.
- 17 – Andreas Schaerer, Swiss vocalist and composer.
- 30 – Miguel Zenón, Puerto Rican alto saxophonist, composer, band leader, music producer, and educator.

Unknown date

- Daniel Fredriksson, Swedish drummer.
- Jakob Høyer, Danish drummer.
- Tamar Halperin, Israeli harpsichordist, pianist, and musicologist.
- Yasuyuki "Yaz" Takagi, Japanese saxophonist.

== See also ==
- 1970s in jazz
- List of years in jazz
- 1976 in music
