= 1951 in jazz =

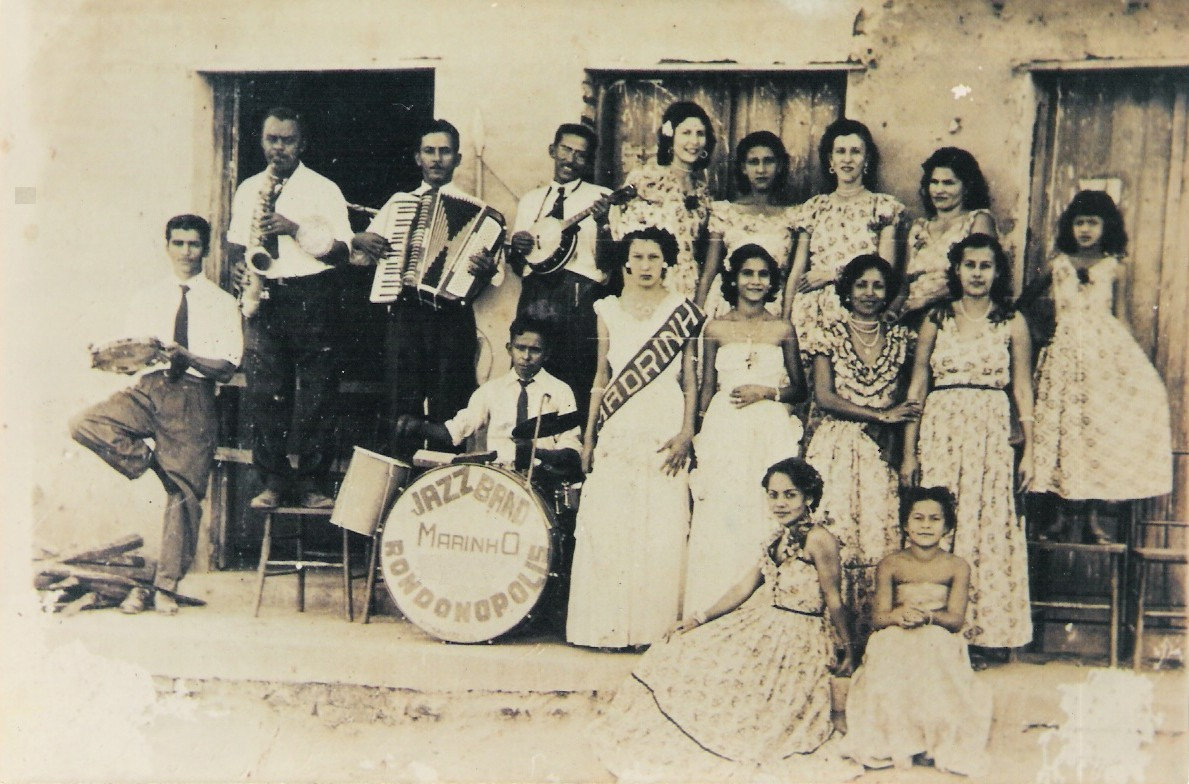
- The Jazz band of Brazilian saxophonist Marinho de Oliveira Franco
- Decade: 1950s in jazz
- Music: 1951 in music
- Standards: List of post-1950 jazz standards
- See also: 1950 in jazz – 1952 in jazz

This is a timeline documenting events of Jazz in the year 1951.

== Events ==
- The first American Jazz festival takes place at Wilkes-Barre, Pennsylvania in the autumn. This festival precedes the first Newport Jazz Festival.
- The tenor saxophonist Sonny Rollins, a Coleman Hawkins influenced player, joins the group of Miles Davis.

== Album releases ==
- Stan Kenton: City of Glass
- Oscar Peterson: 1951
- Shorty Rogers: Modern Sounds
- Lester Young: Lester Young Trio

== Deaths ==
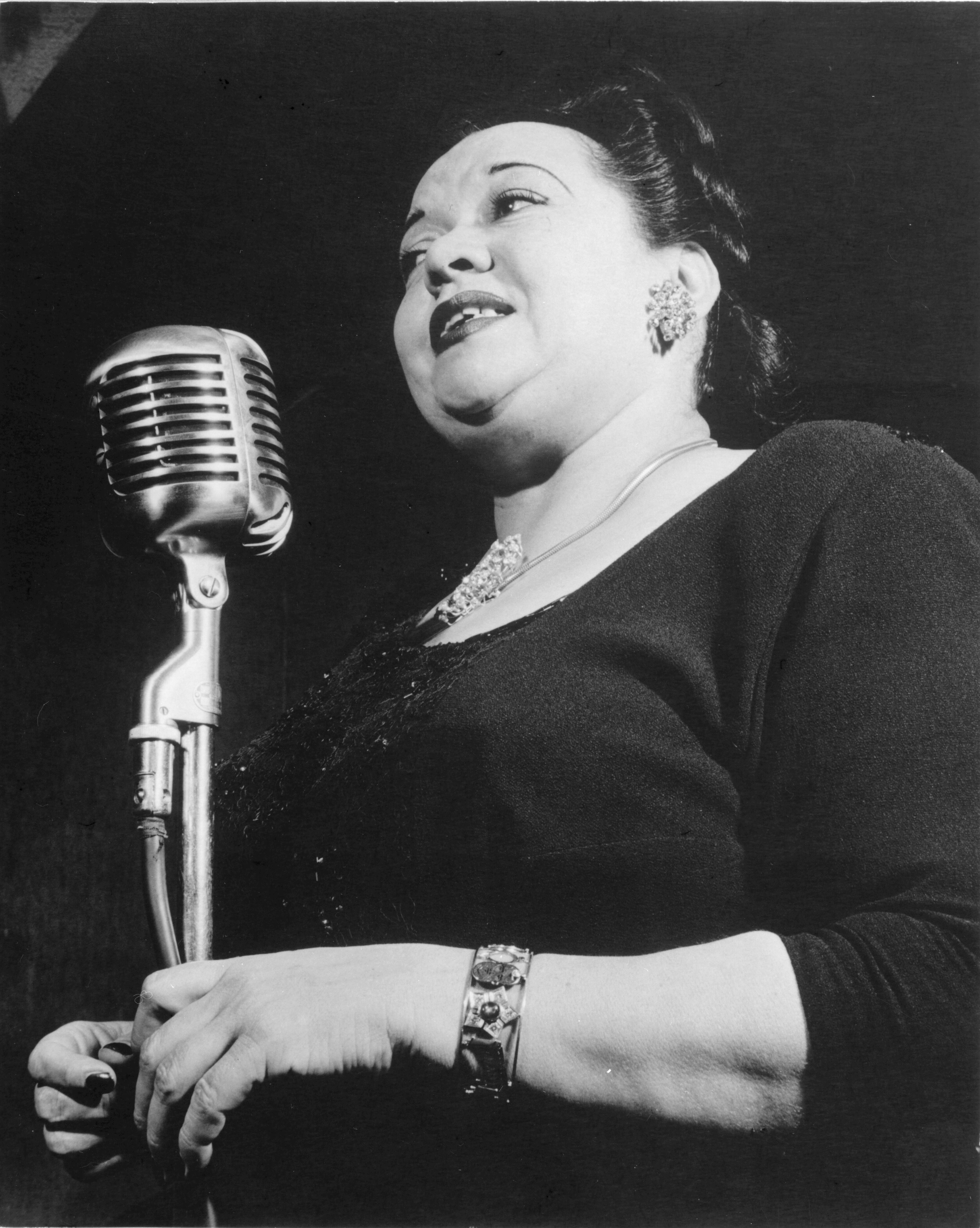
Mildred Bailey

January

- 21 – R.Q. Dickerson, American trumpeter (born 1898).

February

- 7 – Shirley Clay, American trumpeter (born 1902).

March

- 25 – Sid Catlett, American swinging drummer (born 1910).

May

- 4 – Doc West, American drummer (born 1915).

August

- 17 – Ray Wetzel, American trumpeter (born 1924).

October

- 26 – Charlie Creath, American trumpeter, saxophonist, accordionist, and bandleader (born 1890).

December

- 3 – Cyril Blake, Trinidadian trumpeter (born 1900).
- 12 – Mildred Bailey, American singer (born 1903).
- 23 – Enrique Santos Discépolo, Argentine tango and milonga pianist, bandoneónist, and singer (born 1901).
- 26 – Vic Berton, American jazz drummer (born 1896).

Unknown date

- Valentin Parnakh, Russian poet, translator, historian, explorer, musician, choreographer, ballet master, best remembered as a founding father of Soviet jazz (born 1891).

== Births ==
January

- 1 – Ashwin Batish, Indian sitar and tabla player.
- 4 – Håkan Rydin, Swedish pianist.
- 9 – Idris Ackamoor, American multi-instrumentalist.
- 12 – Earl Howard, American saxophonist, synthesizer player and multi-instrumentalist.
- 14 – Mark Egan, American bass guitarist and trumpeter.
- 18 – Steve Grossman, American saxophonist.
- 30
  - Phil Collins, English drummer, singer-songwriter, record producer, and actor.
  - Ralph Lalama, American saxophonist.

February

- 2 – Alphonso Johnson, American bassist.
- 20 – Anthony Davis, American pianist and composer.
- 21
  - Herb Robertson, American trumpeter and flugelhornist.
  - Warren Vache, American trumpeter, cornetist, and flugelhornist.
- 28 – Roseanna Vitro, American singer.

March

- 3 – Lindsay Cooper, English bassoon and oboe player, composer, and political activist (died 2013).
- 7 – Rocco Prestia, American bassist, Tower of Power.
- 8 – James Williams, American pianist (died 2004).
- 13
  - Geoff Eales, Welsh pianist, improviser, and composer.
  - Michael Jefry Stevens, American pianist.
- 18 – Bill Frisell, American guitarist and composer.
- 21 – Fred Sturm, American composer, arranger, and teacher (died 2014).
- 24 – Gregory B. Johnson, American pianist, Cameo.

April

- 3 – Mitch Woods, American pianist and singer.
- 7 – Bob Berg, American saxophonist (died 2002).
- 9 – Hugh Ragin, American trumpeter.
- 10 – Steve Lodder, British keyboardist, composer, and organist.
- 15 – Bill MacCormick, English bassist and vocalist.
- 26 – Billy Newton-Davis, Canadian singer-songwriter.
- 29 – Vinicius Cantuária, Brazilian singer, songwriter, guitarist, drummer, and percussionist.
- 30 – Alexander Zonjic, Canadian flutist.

May

- 3 – Krister Andersson, Swedish saxophonist and composer.
- 14 – Jay Beckenstein, American saxophonist, composer, and producer, Spyro Gyra.
- 28 – Richard Niles, American guitarist, composer, and record producer.
- 31 – Jimmy Nalls, American guitarist and singer, Sea Level (died 2017).

June

- 15 – Mark Hennen, American pianist.
- 19 – Karen Young, Canadian singer, lyricist, and composer.
- 20 – Peter Gordon, American composer and musician.
- 30 – Stanley Clarke, American bassist, Return to Forever.

July

- 7 – Sue Evans, American American percussionist and drummer.
- 16 – Bobby Previte, American drummer, composer, and bandleader.
- 21 – Pino Minafra, Italian trumpeter and flugelhornist.
- 22 – Richard Bennett, American guitarist and record producer.
- 29 – Charles Loos, Belgian pianist and composer.
- 31 – Howard Levy, American harmonica player and multi-instrumentalist.

August

- 1 – Tommy Bolin, American guitarist, Deep Purple (died 1976).
- 5 – Jemeel Moondoc, American saxophonist.
- 15
  - António Pinho Vargas, Portuguese composer and pianist.
  - Bobby Caldwell, American singer and songwriter.
- 19 – Roland Batik, Austrian pianist and composer.
- 22 – Edwin Birdsong, American keyboard/organ player.

September

- 3 – Todd Cochran, American pianist, keyboard and synthesizer player, Fuse One.
- 7 – Mark Isham, American trumpeter and synthesist.
- 12 – Joëlle Léandre, French upright bassist, vocalist, and composer.
- 15 – Carla White, American vocalist (died 2007).
- 17 – Theryl DeClouet, American singer, Galactic (died 2018).
- 18 – Steve Slagle, American saxophonist, flautist, and composer.
- 23 – Steven Springer, American guitarist, Trinidad Tripoli Steel Band (died 2012).

October

- 2 – Sting, American singer, bassist, and guitarist, the Police.
- 17 – Jukka Gustavson, Finnish organist, keyboarder, and composer.
- 30
  - Poncho Sanchez, Mexican-American conguero (conga player).
  - Trilok Gurtu, Indian percussionist and composer.

November

- 17 – Lisle Ellis, Canadian upright bassist and composer.
- 19 – Kenny Werner, American pianist and composer.
- 28
  - Dennis Irwin, American upright bassist (died 2008).
  - Diedre Murray, American cellist and composer.
  - Peter Malick, American guitarist and record producer.

December

- 1 – Jaco Pastorius, American bassist, Weather Report (died 1987).
- 3 – Barry Finnerty, American guitarist, keyboardist, singer, songwriter, and arranger.
- 14 – Nükhet Ruacan, Turkish singer and educator in musicology (died 2007).
- 16 – Robben Ford, American guitarist, L.A. Express.
- 20 – Brynjulf Blix, Norwegian pianist.
- 21 – Alex Blake, American upright bassist and bass guitarist.
- 26
  - Brooks Kerr, American pianist (died 2018).
  - John Scofield, American guitarist and composer.
- 28 – Rebecca Parris, American singer (died 2018).
- 31 – Jimmy Haslip, American bass guitarist, Yellowjackets.

Unknown date

- Jon Rose, British-Australian violinist.
- Judi Silvano, American singer and composer.
- Kit McClure, American trombonist, saxophonist, and bandleader.
- La Palabra, Cuban bandleader, singer-songwriter, pianist.
- Lars Jansson, Swedish pianist and composer.
- Tom Kubis, American saxophonist, flautist, and pianist.

== See also ==
- 1950s in jazz
- List of years in jazz
- 1951 in music

== Bibliography ==
- The New Real Book, Volume I. Sher Music. 1988. ISBN 0-9614701-4-3.
- The New Real Book, Volume II. Sher Music. 1991. ISBN 0-9614701-7-8.
- The New Real Book, Volume III. Sher Music. 1995. ISBN 1-883217-30-X.
- The Real Book, Volume I (6th ed.). Hal Leonard. 2004. ISBN 0-634-06038-4.
- The Real Book, Volume II (2nd ed.). Hal Leonard. 2007. ISBN 978-1-4234-2452-9.
- The Real Book, Volume III (2nd ed.). Hal Leonard. 2006. ISBN 0-634-06136-4.
- The Real Jazz Book. Warner Bros. ISBN 978-91-85041-36-7.
- The Real Vocal Book, Volume I. Hal Leonard. 2006. ISBN 0-634-06080-5.
