= 2006 in jazz =

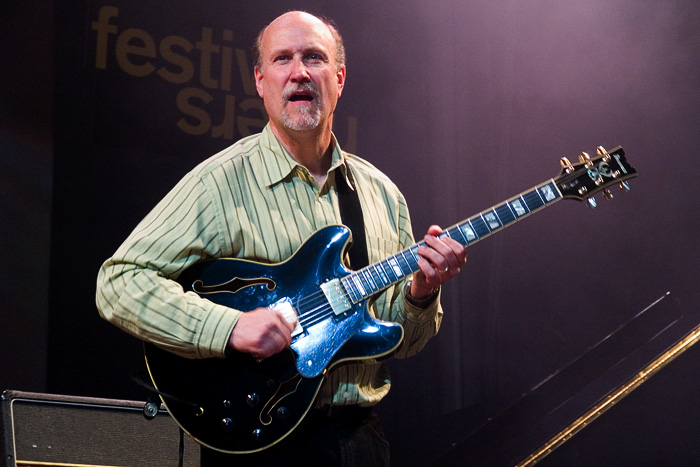
- John Scofield at Moers Festival, June 2006, Germany.
- Decade: 2000s in jazz
- Music: 2006 in music
- Standards: List of jazz standards
- See also: 2005 in jazz – 2007 in jazz

This is a timeline documenting events of Jazz in the year 2006.

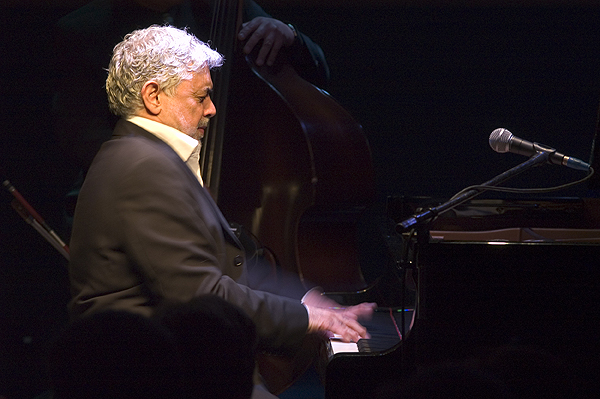
Monty Alexander at Ronnie Scotts Jazz venue, London 2006.

== Events ==
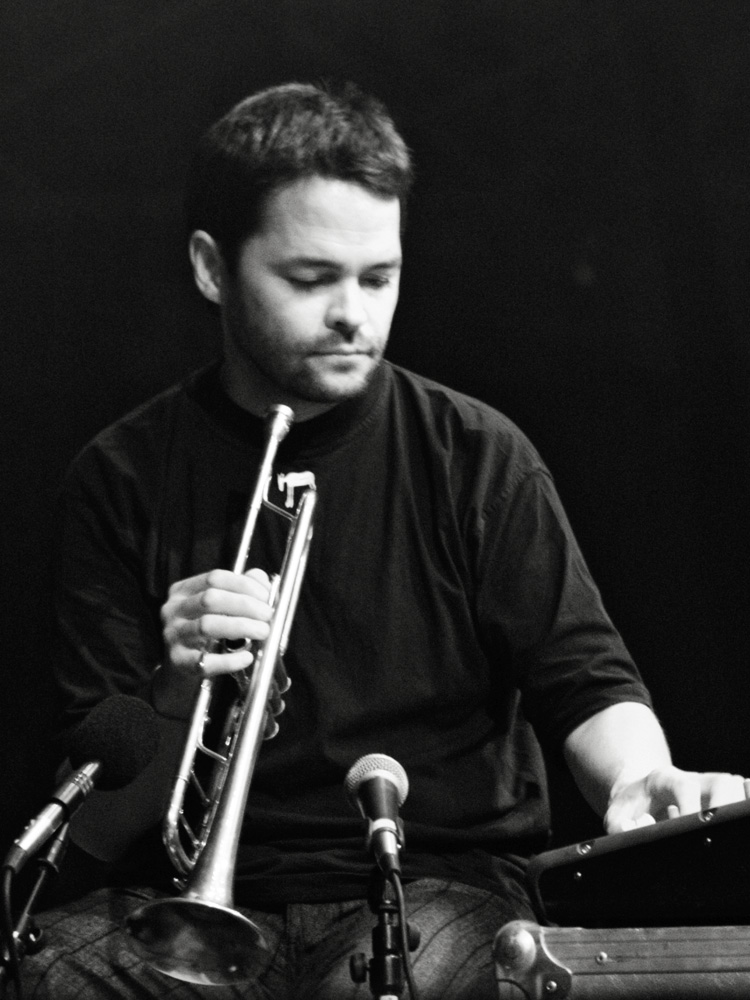
Arve Henriksen at Moers Festival, June 2006, Germany.

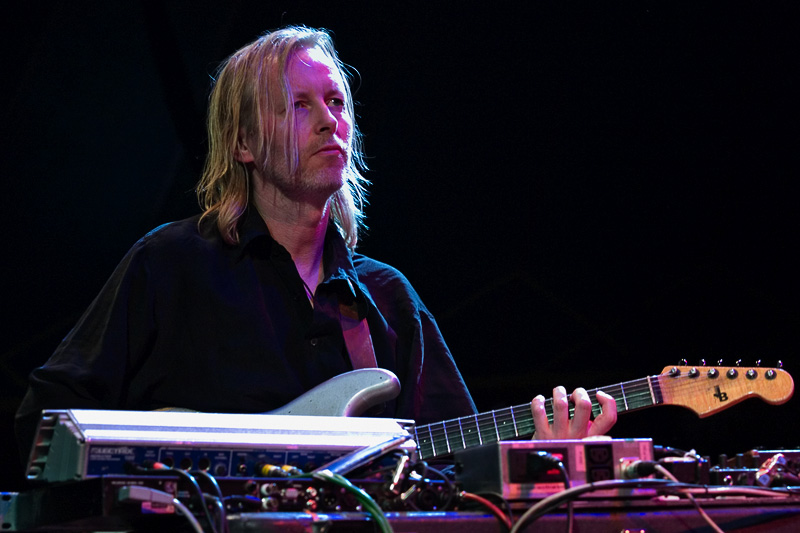
Eivind Aarset at Moers Festival, June 2006, Germany.

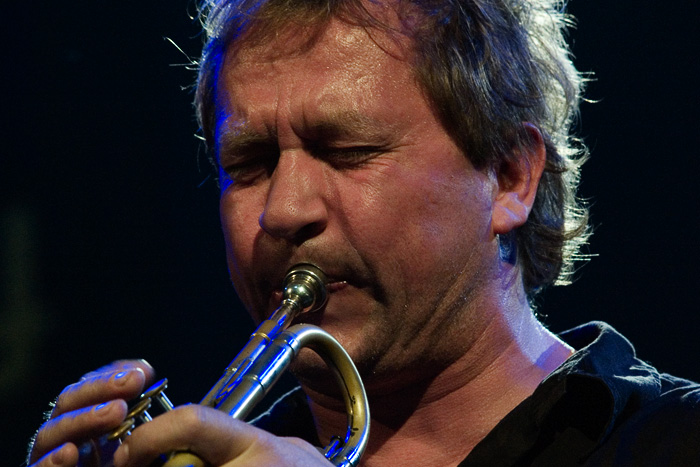
Nils Petter Molvaer at Moers Festival, Germany 2006.

=== January ===
- 13 – The very first Ice Music Festival Festival started in Geilo, Norway (January 13–15).
- 26 – The 9th Polarjazz Festival started in Longyearbyen, Svalbard (January 26–28).

=== March ===
- 3 – The 2nd Jakarta International Java Jazz Festival started in Jakarta, Indonesia (January 3 – 5).

=== April ===
- 7
  - The 33rd Vossajazz started at Vossavangen, Norway (April 7 – 9).
  - Yngve Moe was awarded Vossajazzprisen 2006.
- 8 – Trygve Seim performs the commissioned work Reiser for Vossajazz 2006.

=== May ===
- 23 – The 34th Nattjazz started in Bergen, Norway (May 24 – June 3).

=== June ===
- 2 – The 35th Moers Festival started in Moers, Germany (June 2 – 5).
- 29
  - The 27th Montreal International Jazz Festival started in Montreal, Quebec, Canada (June 29 - July 9).
  - The 18th Jazz Fest Wien started in Vienna, Austria (June 29 – July 16).
- 30 – The 40th Montreux Jazz Festival started in Montreux, Switzerland (June 30 – July 15).

=== July ===
- 5 – The 42nd Kongsberg Jazzfestival started in Kongsberg, Norway (July 5 – 8).
- 7 – The 28th Copenhagen Jazz Festival started in Copenhagen, Denmark (July 7 – 16).
- 14 – The 31st North Sea Jazz Festival started in The Hague, Netherlands (July 14 – 16).
- 15 – The 41st Pori Jazz Festival started in Pori, Finland (July 15 – 23).
- 17 – The 46th Moldejazz started in Molde, Norway (July 17 – 22).
- 18 – The 23rd Stockholm Jazz Festival started in Stockholm, Sweden (July 18 – 22).
- 19 – The 59th Nice Jazz Festival started in Nice, France (July 19 – 26).
- 21 – The 41st San Sebastian Jazz Festival started in San Sebastian, Spain (July 21 – 26).

=== August ===
- 9 – The 20th Sildajazz started in Haugesund, Norway (August 9 – 13).
- 12
  - The 52nd Newport Jazz Festival started in Newport, Rhode Island (April 12 – 14).
- 11 – The 23rd Brecon Jazz Festival started in Brecon, Wales (August 11 – 13).
- 13 – The 21st Oslo Jazzfestival started in Oslo, Norway (August 13 – 19).
- 24 – The 2nd Punktfestivalen started in Kristiansand, Norway (August 24–26).

=== September ===
- 15 – The 49th Monterey Jazz Festival started in Monterey, California (September 15 – 17).

=== November ===
- 10 – The 15th London Jazz Festival started in London, England (November 10 – 19).

== Album released ==
=== January ===
Day	Album	Artist	Label	Notes	Ref.
27	Arcoluz	Renaud Garcia-Fons	Enja Records		

=== February ===
Day	Album	Artist	Label	Notes	Ref
21	Just Friends	Rick Haydon & John Pizzarelli	Mel Bay		

=== September ===
Day	Album	Artist	Label	Notes	Ref.
12	Metheny/Mehldau	Pat Metheny and Brad Mehldau	Nonesuch Records		
26	Heartplay	Charlie Haden and Antonio Forcione	Naim Label	Produced by Charlie Haden	

== Deaths ==
January

- 2 — Michael S. Smith, American drummer and percussionist (born 1946).
- 5 — John Guerin, American percussionist (born 1939).
- 6 — Lou Rawls, American singer, songwriter, actor, and record producer (born 1933).
- 12 – Takehiro Honda, Japanese pianist (born 1945).
- 22 – Sherman Ferguson, American drummer (born 1944).

February

- 3 — Romano Mussolini, Italian pianist (born 1927).
- 7 — Jack Montrose, American tenor saxophonist (born 1928).
- 8
  - Elton Dean, English saxophonist (born 1945).
  - Richard Dunbar, American player of the French horn (born 1944).
- 14 – Putte Wickman, Swedish clarinetist (born 1924).
- 17 – Ray Barretto, American percussionist (born 1929).
- 28 – Irv Kluger, American jazz drummer (born 1921).

March

- 7 — Ken Sykora, English guitarist and radio presenter (born 1923).
- 8 — Raphe Malik, American trumpeter (born 1948).
- 17 – Narvin Kimball, American musician (born 1909).
- 28 – Don Alias, American percussionist (born 1939).
- 30 – Jackie McLean, American alto saxophonist (born 1931).

April

- 18 – John Burch, English pianist, composer, and bandleader (born 1932).

May

- 1 — Rauno Lehtinen, Finnish conductor and composer (born 1932).
- 7 — Joan C. Edwards, American singer (born 1918).
- 10 – John Hicks, American pianist (born 1941).
- 19 – Charles Turner, American trumpeter (born 1936).
- 20 – Tommy Watt, Scottish jazz bandleader (born 1925).

June

- 6 — Hilton Ruiz, Puerto Rican-American pianist (born 1952).
- 14 – Roland Alexander, American saxophonist (born 1935).
- 16 – Vlasta Průchová, Czech singer (born 1926).
- 30 – Ross Tompkins, American pianist (born 1938).

July

- 5 – Don Lusher, English trombonist (born 1923).
- 11 – Bill Miller, American pianist (born 1915).
- 16 – Malachi Thompson, American trumpeter (born 1949).
- 17 – John G. Blowers Jr., American drummer (born 1911).
- 31 – Rufus Harley, American bagpiper (born 1936).

August

- 8 — Duke Jordan, American pianist (born 1922).
- 9 — Miguel "Angá" Díaz, Cuban percussionist (born 1961).
- 23 – Maynard Ferguson, Canadian trumpeter and bandleader (born 1928).
- 28
  - Pip Pyle, English-born drummer (born 1950).
  - Shungo Sawada, Japanese guitarist (born 1930).

September

- 2 — Dewey Redman, American saxophonist and bandleader (born 1931).
- 3 — Ian Hamer, British trumpeter (born 1932).
- 23
  - Etta Baker, American guitarist and singer (born 1913).
  - Aladár Pege, Hungarian upright bassist (born 1939).
- 25 – Steve Marcus, American saxophonist (born 1939).

October

- 6 — Claude Luter, French clarinetist and soprano saxophonist (born 1923).
- 10 – Ed Summerlin, American composer, arranger, saxophonist, and music educator (born 1928).
- 25 – Walt Harper, American pianist (born 1926).

November

- 1 — Charles W. LaRue, American trombonist (born 1922).
- 7 — Sonny Cohn, American trumpeter (born 1925).
- 17 – Ruth Brown, American singer-songwriter and actress (born 1928).
- 19 – Art Murphy, American pianist and composer (born 1942).
- 23 – Anita O'Day, Canadian pianist (born 1919).
- 24 – Walter Booker, American upright bassist (born 1933).
- 25 – Bobby Byrne, American bandleader, trombonist, and music executive (born 1918).
- 27 – Don Butterfield, American tubist (born 1923).

December

- 4 – Dave Black, American drummer (born 1928).
- 7 — Jay McShann, American pianist and bandleader (born 1916).
- 8 — Martha Tilton, American singer (born 1915).
- 12
  - Kenny Davern, American clarinetist (born 1935).
  - Oscar Klein, Austrian trumpeter and multi-instrumentalist (born 1930).
- 14 – Sivuca, Brazilian accordionist and guitarist (born 1930).
- 18 – Pupo De Luca, Italian actor and musician (born 1924).
- 20 – Mick Mulligan, English trumpeter and bandleader (born 1928).
- 23 – Timothy J. Tobias, American composer and pianist (born 1952).
- 24 – Kenneth Sivertsen, Norwegian composer and guitarist (born 1961).
- 27 – Jean-Pierre Gebler, Belgian saxophonist (born 1938).

Unknown date

- Barry Buckley, Australian upright bassist (born 1938).

== Births ==
January

- 10 – Angelina Jordan, Norwegian singer.

== See also ==
- List of years in jazz
- 2000s in jazz
- 2006 in music
- 2006 in Swiss music
