= 1998 in jazz =

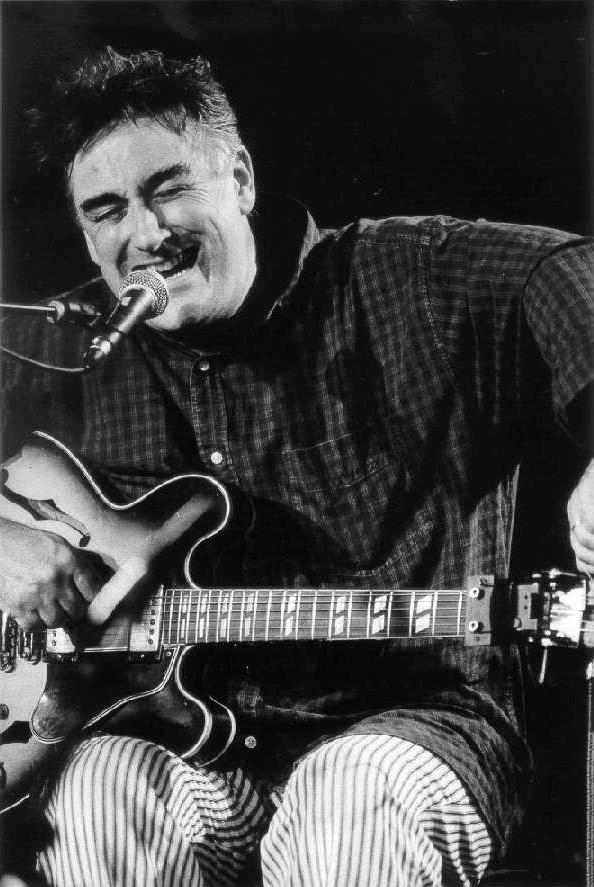
- Fred Frith performing at the Moers Jazz Festival, June 1998
- Decade: 1990s in jazz
- Music: 1998 in music
- Standards: List of post-1950 jazz standards
- See also: 1997 in jazz – 1999 in jazz

This is a timeline documenting events of Jazz in the year 1998.

== Events ==
=== January ===
- 29 – The very first Polarjazz started in Longyearbyen, Svalbard (February 29 – 31).

=== April ===
- 3 – The 25th Vossajazz started in Vossavangen, Norway (April 3 – 5).

=== May ===
- 20 – The 26th Nattjazz started in Bergen, Norway (May 20 – 31).

=== June ===
- 2 – The 27th Moers Festival started in Moers, Germany (June 2 – 5).

=== July ===
- 1 – The 19th Montreal International Jazz Festival started in Montreal, Quebec, Canada (July 1 – 12).
- 2 – The 8th Jazz Fest Wien started in Wien, Austria (July 2 – 10).
- 3 – The 32nd Montreux Jazz Festival started in Montreux, Switzerland (July 3 – 18).
- 10
  - The 23rd North Sea Jazz Festival started in The Hague, Netherlands (July 10 – 12).
  - The 33rd Pori Jazz started in Pori, Finland (July 10 – 19).

=== August ===
- 7 – The 15th Brecon Jazz Festival started in Brecon, Wales (August 7 – 9).

=== September ===
- 18 – The 41st Monterey Jazz Festival started in Monterey, California (September 18 – 20).

== Album releases ==
- Dave Douglas: Convergence
- Paul Plimley: Sensology
- Vandermark 5: Target Dr Flag
- Zeena Parkins: Pan-Acousticon
- Evan Parker: Drawn Inward
- Dave Holland: Points of View
- Roy Campbell: Ancestral Homeland
- Hugh Masekela: Black to the Future

== Deaths ==
January

- 1 – Dave Schildkraut, American alto saxophonist (born 1925).
- 8 – Jimmy Butts, American upright bassist (born 1917).
- 16 – Tommy Pederson, American trombonist and composer (born 1920).
- 22 – Anselmo Sacasas, Cuban pianist, bandleader, composer, and arranger (born 1912).
- 24 – Walter Bishop Jr., American pianist (born 1927).
- 25 – Attila Zoller, American guitarist (born 1927).
- 26 – Orlando DiGirolamo, American accordionist, pianist, and composer (born 1924).

February

- 5 – Nick Webb, English guitarist and composer, Acoustic Alchemy (born 1954).
- 13 – Thomas Chapin, American composer, saxophonist, and multi-instrumentalist (born 1957).

March

- 2 – Marzette Watts, American tenor and soprano saxophonist (born 1938).
- 12 – Red Richards, American pianist (born 1912).
- 15 – Tim Maia, Brazilian musician, songwriter and businessman (born 1942).
- 22 – George Howard, American saxophonist (born 1956).
- 24 – Denis Charles, American drummer (born 1933).
- 27 – Jimmy Campbell, American drummer (born 1928).

April

- 3 – Alvin Tyler, American saxophonist and arranger (born 1925).
- 9 – Tom Cora, American cellist and composer (born 1953).
- 21 – Helen Ward, American singer (born 1913).
- 24 – Mel Powell, American pianist, composer and educator (born 1923).

May

- 5 – Syd Lawrence, British trumpeter and bandleader (born 1923).
- 7 – Blue Lu Barker, American singer (born 1913).
- 8 – Raymond Premru, American trombonist and composer (born 1934).
- 14 – Frank Sinatra, American singer and actor (born 1915).
- 19 – Dorothy Donegan, American pianist (born 1922).
- 22 – Milton Banana, American drummer (born 1935).
- 24 – George Kelly, American tenor saxophonist, vocalist and arranger (born 1915).
- 27 – Spencer Clark, American bass saxophonist and multi-instrumentalist (born 1908).
- 28 – Joe Dixon, American reedist (born 1917).
- 29 – Ted Dunbar, American guitarist, composer and educator (born 1937).

June

- 8 – Harry Lookofsky, American violinist (born 1913).
- 10
  - Bobby Bryant, American trumpeter and flugelhorn player (born 1934).
  - Jimmy Henderson, American trombonist and bandleader (born 1921).
- 20 – Robert Normann, Norwegian guitarist (born 1916).
- 22 – Benny Green, British saxophonist (born 1927).

July

- 2 – Errol Parker, French-Algerian pianist ( (born 1925).
- 11 – Guy Lafitte, American tenor saxophonist (born 1927).
- 14 – Beryl Bryden, English singer (born 1920).
- 25 – Tal Farlow, American guitarist (born 1921).
- 28 – Dorothy Sloop, American pianist (born 1913).

August

- 6 – Nat Gonella, American trumpeter, bandleader and vocalist (born 1908).
- 11 – Benny Waters, American saxophonist and clarinetist (born 1902).
- 16 – Milton Adolphus, American pianist and composer (born 1913).
- 22 – Jimmy Skidmore, English tenor saxophonist (born 1916).
- 24 – Carl Barriteau, Trinidadian clarinetist (born 1914).

September

- 6 – Bob Hames, American guitarist (born 1920).
- 15 – Barrett Deems, American drummer (born 1914).
- 16 – Andrzej Trzaskowski, Polish composer, pianist, and musicologist (born 1933).
- 26 – Betty Carter, American singer, composer, and bandleader (born 1929).

October

- 8 – Glenn Spearman, American tenor saxophonist (born 1947).
- 31 – Sherwood Johnson, American jazz patron and the founder in 1954 of Shakey's Pizza (born 1925).

November

- 12 – Kenny Kirkland, American pianist and keyboardist (born 1955).
- 20 – Roland Alphonso, Jamaican tenor saxophonist, The Skatalites (born 1931).
- 29 – George Van Eps, American guitarist (born 1913).

December

- 2 – Bob Haggart, American upright bassist, composer and arranger (born 1914).
- 4 – Egil Johansen, Norwegian-Swedish drummer (born 1934).
- 26 – Dick Grove, American pianist and composer (born 1927).

Unknown date

- David Earle Johnson, American percussionist, a composer and a music producer (born unknown date).

== Births ==
Unknown date

- Sasha Berliner, American vibraphonist, percussionist, composer, producer, and band leader.

== See also ==
- 1990s in jazz
- List of years in jazz
- 1998 in music
