= 1997 in jazz =

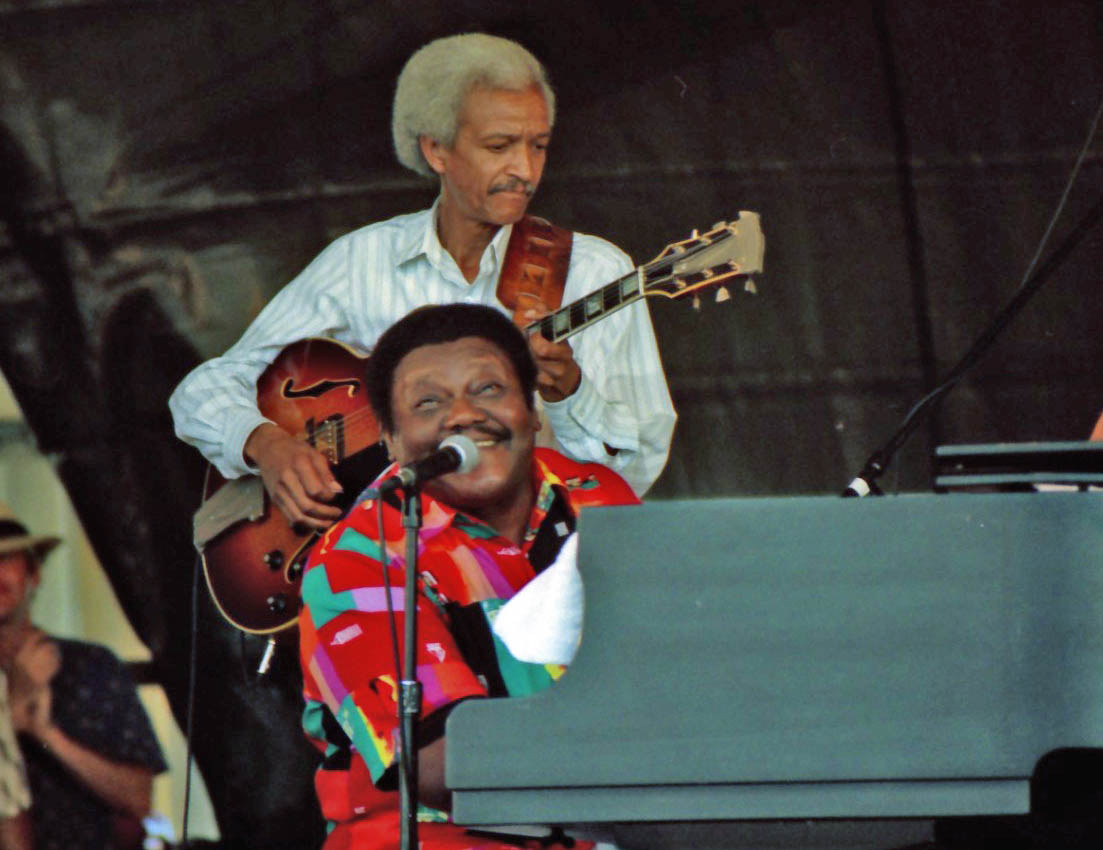
- Fats Domino at the New Orleans Jazz & Heritage Festival
- Decade: 1990s in jazz
- Music: 1997 in music
- Standards: List of post-1950 jazz standards
- See also: 1996 in jazz – 1998 in jazz

This is a timeline documenting events of Jazz in the year 1997.

== Events ==
=== March ===
- 21 – The 24th Vossajazz started in Vossavangen, Norway (March 21 – 23).

=== May ===
- 16 – The 26th Moers Festival started in Moers, Germany (May 16 – 19).
- 21 – The 25th Nattjazz started in Bergen, Norway (May 21 – 31).

=== June ===
- 26 – The 18th Montreal International Jazz Festival started in Montreal, Quebec, Canada (June 26 – July 6).

=== July ===
- 2 – The 7th Jazz Fest Wien started in Wien, Austria (July 2 – 13).
- 4 – The 31st Montreux Jazz Festival started in Montreux, Switzerland (July 4 – 19).
- 11
  - The 22nd North Sea Jazz Festival started in The Hague, Netherlands (July 11 – 13).
  - The 50th Nice Jazz Festival started in France (July 11 – 20).
- 12 – The 32nd Pori Jazz Festival started in Finland (July 12 – 20).
- 15 – The 38th Moldejazz started in Molde, Norway (July 15 – 20).

=== August ===
- 8 – The 14th Brecon Jazz Festival started in Brecon, Wales (August 8 – 10).

=== September ===
- 19 – The 40th Monterey Jazz Festival started in Monterey, California (September 19 – 21).

=== October ===
- 7 – Blue Note – A Story of Modern Jazz, by jazz documentarist and filmmaker Julian Benedikt, an award-winning documentary film.

== Album releases ==
=== October ===
Day	Album	Artist	Label	Notes	Ref.
7	Imaginary Day	Pat Metheny Group	Warner Bros.	Produced by Pat Metheny, Lyle Mays	

=== Unknown date ===
- Guillermo Gregorio: Ellipsis
- Matthew Shipp: Strata
- Steve Coleman: Genesis
- Marcus Roberts: Blues for the New Millennium
- ICP Orchestra: Jubilee Varia
- Vandermark 5: Single Piece Flow
- David Liebman: Time Immemorial
- Wynton Marsalis: Blood on the Fields
- Franz Koglmann: O Moon My Pin Up
- Courtney Pine: Underground
- Leo Smith: Golden Hearts Remembrance
- Keith Tippett: Colours Fulfilled
- Joe Lovano: Trio Fascination
- David Liebman: The Elements - Water
- Fred Anderson: Fred Anderson / DKV Trio
- Carol Sloane and Clark Terry: The Songs Ella & Louis Sang

== Deaths ==
January

- 8 – George Handy, American arranger, composer, and pianist (born 1920).
- 12 – Wally Rose, American pianist (born 1913).
- 16 – Beverly Peer, American upright bassist (born 1912).
- 25 – Seldon Powell, American tenor saxophonist and flautist (born 1928).

February

- 10 – Lou Bennett, American organist (born 1926).
- 14 – Charles Moffett, American drummer (born 1929).
- 20 – Zachary Breaux, American guitarist (born 1960).
- 23 – Tony Williams, American drummer (born 1945).

March

- 11 – Hugh Lawson, American pianist (born 1935).

May

- 10 – Bernard Anderson, American trumpeter (born 1919).
- 12 – Louis Barbarin, American drummer (born 1902).
- 14 – Thelma Carpenter, American singer and actress (born 1922).
- 15 – Tommy Turrentine, American trumpeter (born 1928).
- 18 – Horst Lippmann, German drummer, concert promoter, writer, and television director (born 1927).
- 31 – Eddie Jones, American upright bassist (born 1929).

June

- 2 – Doc Cheatham, American trumpeter, singer and bandleader (born 1905).
- 4
  - Anne Lenner, English singer (born 1912).
  - Johnny "Hammond" Smith, American organist (born 1933).
- 12 – Chuck Andrus, American upright bassist (born 1928).
- 14 – Arthur Prysock, American singer (born 1924).
- 16 – Rolf Ericson, Swedish trumpeter and flugelhornist (born 1922).
- 19 – Thurman Green, American trombonist (born 1940).

July

- 2 – Stan Barker, American pianist (born 1926).
- 29 – Chuck Wayne, American guitarist (born 1923).

August

- 2 – Fela Kuti, Nigerian saxophonist and multi-instrumentalist (born 1938).
- 8
  - Dardanelle Hadley, American singer, vibraphonist, pianist, composer, and arranger (born 1917).
  - Duncan Swift, British pianist (born 1943).
- 12 – Dick Marx, American pianist and arranger (born 1924).
- 14 – Eric Von Essen, American bassist, pianist, and composer (born 1954).
- 24 – Tete Montoliu, American pianist (born 1933).

September

- 18 – Jimmy Witherspoon, American singer (born 1920).
- 20 – Dick Shearer, American trombonist (born 1940).

October

- 29 – Big Nick Nicholas, American saxophonist and vocalist (born 1922).

November

- 2 – Carson Smith, American upright bassist (born 1931).
- 9 – Joe Roccisano, saxophonist and arranger (born 1939).
- 10 – Tommy Tedesco, American guitarist (born 1930).
- 11 – Shake Keane, American trumpeter and poet (born 1927).
- 12 – Carola Standertskjöld, Finnish singer (born 1941).

December

- 1 – Stéphane Grappelli, French violinist (born 1908).
- 6 – George Chisholm, American trombonist (born 1915).
- 12 – Mouse Randolph, American trumpeter (born 1909).
- 21 – Johnny Coles, American trumpeter (born 1926).
- 30 – Ray Crawford, American guitarist (born 1924).

Unknown date

- Johnny Mince, American clarinetist (born 1912).

== Births ==
Unknown date

- Barbra Lica, Canadian jazz singer and songwriter.

== See also ==
- 1990s in jazz
- List of years in jazz
- 1997 in music
