= 1901 in jazz =

- Decade: Pre-1920 in jazz
- Music: 1901 in music
- Standards: List of pre-1920 jazz standards
- See also: 1900 in jazz – 1902 in jazz

This is a timeline documenting events of Jazz in the year 1901.

== Events ==
- Charles Booth performs "Creole Belles" by J. Bodewalt Lampe. His performance is the first acoustic recording of ragtime to be made commercially available, for the new Victor label.

== Births ==
February

- 11 – Claude Jones, American trombonist (died 1962).

March

- 27 – Enrique Santos Discépolo, Argentine tango and milonga pianist, bandoneón player, ainger and composer (died 1951).
- 29 – Sidney Arodin, American clarinetist and songwriter (died 1948).

April

- 9 – Arthur Briggs, Granadian-born trumpeter (died 1991)

May

- 11 – Edmond Hall, American clarinetist and bandleader (died 1967).
- 20 – Jimmy Blythe, American pianist and composer (died 1931).
- 30 – Frankie Trumbauer, American saxophonist, composer and bandleader (died 1956).

June

- 8 – Lou Black, American banjo player (died 1965).

July

- 1 – Richard Plunket Greene, English musician and author, member of the bright young things (died 1978).

August

- 4 – Louis Armstrong, American trumpeter, composer, singer and actor (died 1971).
- 25 – Charlie Burse, African-American ukulele player (died 1965).
- 26 – Jimmy Rushing, American blues shouter, balladeer, singer and pianist (died 1972).

September

- 2 – Phil Napoleon, American trumpeter and bandleader (died 1990).
- 30 – Thelma Terry, American bandleader and upright bassist (died 1966).

October

- 17 – Lee Collins, American trumpeter (died 1960).
- 18 – Annette Hanshaw, American singer (died 1985).
- 20 – Adelaide Hall, American singer and entertainer (died 1993).

November

- 9 – Muggsy Spanier, American cornetist (died 1967).
- 16 – Jesse Stone, American pianist and songwriter (died 1999).
- 22 – Polo Barnes, American clarinetist and saxophonist (died 1981).

December

- 22 – Danny Polo, American clarinetist (died 1949).
