= 1902 in jazz =

- Decade: Pre-1920 in jazz
- Music: 1902 in music
- Standards: List of pre-1920 jazz standards
- See also: 1901 in jazz – 1903 in jazz

This is a timeline documenting events of Jazz in the year 1902.

== Events ==
- Jelly Roll Morton start to get attention in the New Orleans scene, at the age of 17 years, as a brothel piano player. He primarily plays Ragtime and a little Blues at this point. He is one of the first to play this mix that is a forerunner of Jazz. He later claimed to have invented Jazz in this year by combining Ragtime, Quadrilles and Blues.

== Births ==
January

- 3 – Preston Jackson, American trombonist (died 1983).
- 9 – Mel Stitzel, German-American pianist, New Orleans Rhythm Kings (died 1952).
- 13 – Putney Dandridge, African-American bandleader, jazz pianist and vocalist (died 1946).
- 23 – Benny Waters, American saxophonist and clarinetist (died 1998).

February

- 6 – George Brunies, American trombonist (died 1974).

March

- 11 – Chauncey Morehouse, American drummer (died 1980).
- 16 – Leon Roppolo, American clarinetist (died 1943).
- 30 – Ted Heath, English musician and big band leader (died 1969).

April

- 6 – Rosy McHargue, American clarinetist (died 1999).
- 24 – Rube Bloom, Jewish-American songwriter, pianist, arranger, band leader, singer, and author (died 1976).

June

- 6 – Jimmie Lunceford, American alto saxophonist and bandleader (died 1947).
- 7 – Ed Cuffee, American trombonist (died 1959).
- 17 – Chris Columbus, American drummer (died 2002).
- 26 – Artemi Ayvazyan, Soviet-Armenian composer, conductor, and founder of the Armenian State Jazz Orchestra (died 1975).
- 27 – Georg Malmstén, Finnish singer, musician, composer, orchestra conductor, and actor (died 1981).

July

- 4 – Erik Tuxen, Danish big band leader, composer, and arranger (died 1957).
- 7 – Jim McCartney, English trumpeter and pianist (died 1976).
- 19
  - Buster Bailey, American clarinet, but also well versed on saxophone (died 1967).
  - Cliff Jackson, American stride pianist (died 1970).
- 21 – Omer Simeon, American clarinetist and reedist (died 1959).

August

- 21 – Lloyd Scott, American drummer and bandleader (died unknown date).

September

- 17 – Louis Nelson, American trombonist (died 1990).

October

- 12 – Jimmy Archey, American trombonist (died 1967).
- 24 – Louis Barbarin, American drummer (died 1997).
- 25 – Eddie Lang, American guitarist (died 1933).

November

- 29 – Danny Alvin, American drummer and bandleader (died 1958).

December

- 7 – Cecil Irwin, American reedist and arranger (died 1935).

Unknown date

- Barney Josephson, founder of Café Society in Greenwich Village (died 1988).
- Shirley Clay, American trumpeter (died 1951).
