= 1966 in jazz =

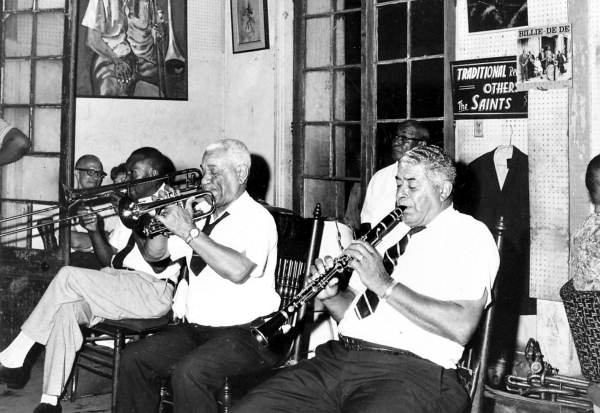
- Preservation Hall Jazz Band, New Orleans, Louisiana. Visible are Jim Robinson, trombone; De De Pierce, trumpet; Willie Humphrey, clarinet.
- Decade: 1960s in jazz
- Music: 1966 in music
- Standards: List of post-1950 jazz standards
- See also: 1965 in jazz – 1967 in jazz

This is a timeline documenting events of Jazz in the year 1966.

== Events ==
=== January ===
- 14 – The Jazz Crusaders record Live at the Lighthouse '66 at the Lighthouse Café in Hermosa Beach, California (January 14 – 16).

=== July ===
- 1 – The 13th Newport Jazz Festival started in Newport, Rhode Island (July 1 – 4).

== Album releases ==
- Alex Schlippenbach: Globe Unity
- Archie Shepp: Mama Too Tight
- Bill Evans: Bill Evans at Town Hall
- Bobby Hutcherson: Happenings
- Bobby Hutcherson: Stick-Up!
- Cecil Taylor: Unit Structures
- Cecil Taylor: Conquistador!
- Charles Lloyd: Dream Weaver
- Charles Tyler: Charles Tyler Ensemble
- Chick Corea: Tones For Joan's Bones
- Denny Zeitlin: Zeitgeist
- Dewey Redman: Look for the Black Star
- Don Cherry: Symphony For Improvisers
- Duke Ellington: The Far East Suite
- Guenter Hampel: Assemblage
- Hank Mobley: Straight No Filter
- Horace Silver: The Jody Grind
- Hugh Masekela: Grrr
- Hugh Masekela: The Americanization of Ooga Booga
- Hugh Masekela: The Emancipation of Hugh Masekela
- Jaki Byard: Sunshine of My Soul
- Joe Harriott: Indo-Jazz Suite
- Joe Harriott: Indo-Jazz Fusions
- John Coltrane: Ascension
- John Coltrane: Meditations
- Joseph Jarman: Song For
- Larry Young: Of Love And Peace
- Lee Morgan: Delightfulee
- Patty Waters: College Tour
- Roscoe Mitchell: Sound
- Sonny Simmons: Music from the Spheres
- Steve Lacy: Sortie
- Steve Lacy: The Forest And The Zoo
- Sun Ra: Strange Strings
- Sunny Murray: Sunny Murray Quintet
- Wayne Shorter: Adam's Apple
- Wayne Shorter: Speak No Evil

== Deaths ==
February

- 10 – Osie Johnson, American drummer, arranger, and singer (born 1923).
- 23 – Billy Kyle, American pianist (born 1914).

March

- 28 – Kid Howard, American trumpeter (born 1908).

May

- 11 – Isaiah Morgan, American trumpeter (born 1897).
- 30 – Thelma Terry, American bandleader and upright bassist (born 1901).

June

- 17 – Johnny St. Cyr, American banjoist and guitarist (born 1890).

July

- 31 – Bud Powell, American pianist (born 1924).

August

- 2 – Boyd Raeburn, American bandleader and bass saxophonist (heart attack) (born 1913).
- 17 – Rolf Billberg, Swedish alto saxophonist (born 1930).

September

- 2 – Darnell Howard, American clarinetist and violinist (born 1895).
- 28 – Lucky Millinder, African-American bandleader (born 1910).

October

- 3 – Dave Lambert, American lyricist and singer (born 1917).
- 7 – Smiley Lewis, American singer and guitarist (born 1913).
- 10 – Colette Bonheur, Canadian singer (born 1927).
- 15 – Lee Blair, American banjoist and guitarist (born 1903).
- 29 – Wellman Braud, American upright bassist (born 1891).

November

- 8 – Shorty Baker, American trumpeter (born 1914).

December

- 17 – Sylvia Telles, Brazilian samba and bossa nova singer (born 1934).

Unknown date

- Nikele Moyake, South African tenor saxophonist, The Blue Notes (born 1933).

== Births ==
January

- 10 – Kristin Sevaldsen, Norwegian saxophonist.
- 12 – Ingrid Jensen, Canadian trumpeter.
- 28 – Julian Argüelles, English saxophonist.

February

- 2 – Greg Gisbert, American trumpeter and flugelhornist.
- 6
  - Larry Grenadier, American upright bassist.
  - Michael Mondesir, English bass guitarist and composer.
- 7 – Henrik Andersen, Danish guitarist, singer-songwriter, multi-instrumentalist, and vocal percussionist.
- 21 – Margareta Bengtson, Swedish soprano singer, The Real Group.

March

- 5 – Ann Farholt, Danish singer.
- 14 – Raul Midón, American singer-songwriter and guitarist.
- 22 – Jan Lundgren, Swedish pianist and composer.
- 25 – Jeff Healey, Canadian singer and guitarist (died 2008).

April

- 2 – Michael Cain, American pianist and composer.
- 12
  - Nils-Olav Johansen, Norwegian guitarist.
  - Rigmor Gustafsson, Swedish singer.
- 15 – Warren Hill, Canadian alto saxaphonist.
- 16 – Jarle Vespestad, Norwegian drummer.
- 22 – Nina Shatskaya, Russian singer and actress.
- 25 – Karen Mantler, American singer, composer, piano, organ, and chromatic harmonica player.

May

- 11 – Julian Joseph, British pianist, bandleader, composer, arranger, and broadcaster.
- 13 – Julian Siegel, British saxophonist, clarinetist, composer, and arranger.
- 20 – Sheryl Bailey, American guitarist and educator
- 28 – Theo Bleckmann, German vocalist and composer.

June

- 8 – John Rae, Scottish drummer, composer, and band leader.
- 19 – Silje Nergaard, Norwegian singer.

July

- 12 – Luciana Souza, Brazilian singer and composer.

August

- 5 – Roberto Tola, Italian guitarist and composer.
- 6 – Regina Carter, American violinist.
- 7 – Torstein Ellingsen, Norwegian drummer.
- 11 – Donny McCaslin, American saxophonist.
- 30 – John Gunther, American saxophonist.

September

- 4 – Biréli Lagrène, French guitarist.
- 17 – Makiko Hirabayashi, Japanese pianist.

October

- 1 – Siri Gellein, Norwegian singer.
- 6 – Mark Whitfield, American guitarist.
- 12 – Harry Allen, American tenor saxophonist.
- 15 – Bill Charlap, American pianist.
- 18 – Bill Stewart, American drummer.
- 27 – Nathalie Loriers, Belgian pianist and composer.

November

- 5 – Øystein B. Blix, Norwegian trombonist.
- 12 – Anthony Joseph, British-Trinidadian poet, novelist, musician, and academic.
- 25 – Jacky Terrasson, American pianist.

Unknown date

- Carl Ludwig Hübsch, German tubist and composer.
- Hilmar Jensson, Icelandic guitarist and composer.
- Lars Møller, Danish saxophonist.
- Nils Davidsen, Danish bassist.
- Ricardo Garcia, Spanish guitarist and bandleader.
- Tony Kofi, British saxophonist and multi-instrumentalist.
- Toshimaru Nakamura, Japanese guitarist and electronica artist.
- Wessell Anderson, American alto and sopranino saxophonist.

== See also ==
- 1960s in jazz
- List of years in jazz
- 1966 in music

== Bibliography ==
- The New Real Book, Volume I. Sher Music. 1988. ISBN 0-9614701-4-3.
- The New Real Book, Volume II. Sher Music. 1991. ISBN 0-9614701-7-8.
- The New Real Book, Volume III. Sher Music. 1995. ISBN 1-883217-30-X.
- The Real Book, Volume I (6th ed.). Hal Leonard. 2004. ISBN 0-634-06038-4.
- The Real Book, Volume II (2nd ed.). Hal Leonard. 2007. ISBN 978-1-4234-2452-9.
- The Real Book, Volume III (2nd ed.). Hal Leonard. 2006. ISBN 0-634-06136-4.
- The Real Jazz Book. Warner Bros. ISBN 978-91-85041-36-7.
- The Real Vocal Book, Volume I. Hal Leonard. 2006. ISBN 0-634-06080-5.
