= 1931 in jazz =

- Decade: 1930s in jazz
- Music: 1931 in music
- Standards: List of 1930s jazz standards
- See also: 1930 in jazz – 1932 in jazz

This is a timeline documenting events of Jazz in the year 1931.

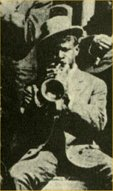
Buddie Petit in 1916

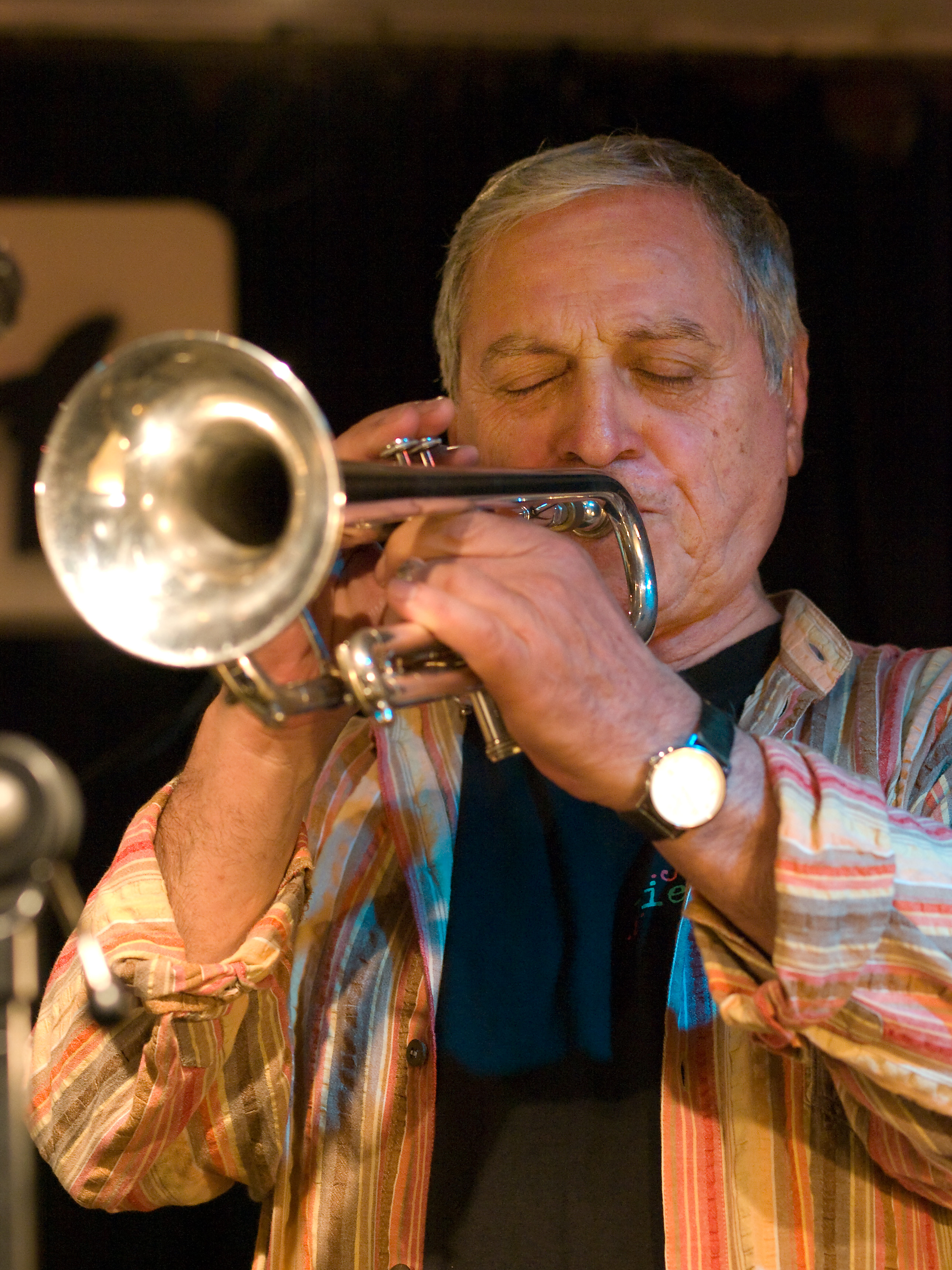
Duško Gojković in 2009

== Deaths ==
June

- 14 – Jimmy Blythe, jazz and boogie woogie pianist (born 1901).

July

- 4 – Buddie Petit, jazz cornetist (born 1897).
- 23 – Jimmy Harrison, American jazz trombonist (born 1900).

August

- 6 – Bix Beiderbecke, American jazz cornetist, jazz pianist, and composer (born 1903).

November

- 4 – Buddy Bolden, cornetist (born 1877).

== Births ==
January

- 1 – Rose Brennan, Irish singer.
- 2 – Frank Marocco, American piano-accordionist (died 2012).
- 3 – John Jenkins, American saxophonist (died 1993).
- 5
  - Alfred Brendel, Austrian pianist, poet and author.
  - Dizzy Reece, Jamaican trumpeter.
- 6 – Keith Christie, English trombonist (died 1980).
- 9 – Carson Smith, American upright bassist (died 1997).
- 12 – Roland Alphonso, Jamaican tenor saxophonist (died 1998).
- 14 – Caterina Valente, Italian singer, guitarist, dancer, and actress.
- 19 – Horace Parlan, American pianist and composer (died 2017).
- 20 – Hachidai Nakamura, Japanese songwriter and pianist (died 1992).
- 22 – Sam Cooke, American singer and songwriter (died 1964).
- 23 – Gianni Coscia, Italian accordionist.
- 30 – Gene Gammage, American drummer.

February

- 6 – John Pisano, American guitarist.
- 11
  - Bobby Lamb, Irish trombonist.
  - Lionel Batiste, American singer and drummer (died 2012).
- 12 – Walt Groller, American accordionist (died 2023).

March

- 4 – Sonya Hedenbratt, Swedish singer and actress (died 2001).
- 11 – Allan Ganley, English drummer (died 2008).
- 15
  - D. J. Fontana, American drummer (died 2018).
  - Theo Bophela, South African band leader, composer, pianist, arranger, and music educator (died 2017).
- 17 – Karel Velebný, Czech vibraphonist, pianist, and saxophonist (died 1989).
- 25 – Paul Motian, American drummer and percussionist (died 2011).

April

- 4 – Jake Hanna, American drummer (died 2010).
- 17 – David Axelrod, American composer and producer (died 2017).
- 18 – Willie Pickens, American pianist (died 2017).
- 22 – Joe Cuba, Puerto Rican-American conga drummer (died 2009).
- 27 – Krzysztof Komeda, Polish film composer and pianist (died 1969).
- 29 – Lonnie Donegan, Scottish guitarist, singer, and songwriter (died 2002).
- 30 – Dick Twardzik, American pianist (died 1955).

May

- 1 – Ira Sullivan, American trumpeter, flugelhornist, flautist, and saxophonist (died 2020).
- 2 – Richard Holmes, American organist (died 1991).
- 4
  - Ed Cassidy, American drummer (died 2012).
  - Richard Williams, American trumpeter (died 1985).
- 7 – Teresa Brewer, American singer (died 2007).
- 9 – Raymond Berthiaume, Canadian singer (died 2009).
- 11 – Freddie Roach, American Hammond B3 organist (died 1980).
- 14 – Alvin Lucier, American composer of experimental music and sound installations (died 2021).
- 16 – Walt Dickerson, American vibraphonist (died 2008).
- 17
  - Dewey Redman, American saxophonist (died 2006).
  - Jackie McLean, American alto saxophonist (died 2006).
- 20 – Louis Smith, American trumpeter (died 2016)
- 27 – Diz Disley, Anglo-Canadian guitarist (died 2010).
- 31 – Dick Garcia, American guitarist.

June

- 2 – Ronnie Bedford, American drummer (died 2014).
- 7 – Mike Pratt, English actor, musician, songwriter, and screenwriter (died 1976).
- 10 – João Gilberto, Brazilian singer, songwriter, and guitarist (died 2019).
- 13 – Georges Arvanitas, French pianist and organist (died 2005).
- 14 – Junior Walker, American saxophonist (died 1995).
- 17 – Dominic Frontiere, American composer, arranger, and accordionist (died 2017).
- 19 – Phil Bates, English upright bassist.
- 30 – Andrew Hill, American pianist and composer (died 2007).

July

- 6 – Della Reese, American singer (died 2017).
- 11 – Tab Hunter, American actor, singer, and author (died 2018).
- 13 – Long John Hunter, American guitarist, singer, and songwriter (died 2016).
- 21
  - Plas Johnson, American tenor saxophonist.
  - Sonny Clark, American pianist (died 1963).
- 26 – Patti Bown, American pianist and singer (died 2008).
- 31 – Kenny Burrell, American guitarist.

August

- 15 – Terry Pollard, American pianist and vibraphonist (died 2009).
- 17 – Derek Smith, British pianist (died 2016).
- 20
  - Alain Goraguer, French pianist (died 2023).
  - Frank Capp, American drummer (died 2017).

September

- 1 – Willie Ruff, American French hornist and upright bassist.
- 2 – Clifford Jordan, American tenor saxophonist (died 1993).
- 5 – Richie Powell, American pianist (died 1956).
- 7 – Makanda Ken McIntyre, American saxophonist (died 2001).
- 8 – Marion Brown, American saxophonist and ethnomusicologist (died 2010).
- 10 – Franco Manzecchi, Italian drummer (died 1979).
- 16 – Jan Johansson, Swedish pianist (died 1968).
- 27 – Thandi Klaasen, South African singer (died 2017).
- 28 – John Gilmore, American saxophonist (died 1995).

October

- 14 – Duško Gojković, Serbian trumpeter and composer (died 2023).
- 15 – Freddy Cole, American singer and pianist (died 2020).
- 27 – Sonny Dallas, American bassist and singer (died 2009).
- 28 – Harold Battiste, American saxophonist, pianist, and composer (died 2015).

November

- 1 – Leon Spencer, American organist (died 2012).
- 2 – Phil Woods, American alto saxophonist and clarinetist (died 2015).
- 5 – Harold McNair, Jamaican saxophonist and flautist (died 1971).
- 17 – Wayne Andre, American trombonist (died 2003).
- 23 – Gloria Lynne, American singer (died 2013).
- 25 – Nat Adderley, American trumpeter (died 2000).
- 30 – Jack Sheldon, American trumpeter, singer, and actor (died 2019).

December

- 1
  - Jimmy Lyons, American saxophonist (died 1986).
  - Johnny Răducanu, Romanian pianist (died 2011).
- 2 – Wynton Kelly, Jamaican-American pianist and composer (died 1971).
- 14 – Phineas Newborn Jr., American pianist (died 1989).
- 21 – David Baker, American symphonic jazz composer (died 2016).
- 24 – Ray Bryant, American pianist and composer (died 2011).
- 27 – Walter Norris, American pianist and composer (died 2011).
- 31 – Gil Mellé, American saxophonist and film composer (died 2004).
