= 1923 in jazz =

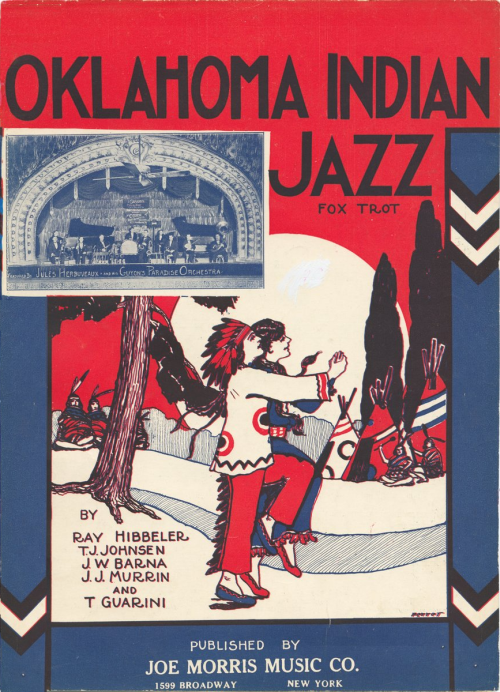
- Oklahoma Indian Jazz
- Decade: 1920s in jazz
- Music: 1923 in music
- Standards: List of 1920s jazz standards
- See also: 1922 in jazz – 1924 in jazz

This is a timeline documenting events of Jazz in the year 1923.

Musicians born that year included Fats Navarro and Tito Alberti.

== Events ==
- April 6: King Oliver's Creole Jazz Band records the King Oliver/Louis Armstrong song Dippermouth Blues
- June 30: Sidney Bechet cuts his first two sides "Wild Cat Blues" and "Kansas City Blues" with Clarence Williams' Blue Five.
- October 29: African-American musical Runnin' Wild premieres at the New Colonial Theatre in New York. The Charleston is one of the songs featured in it.
- December: Harlem-based Black Swan Records declares bankruptcy. Paramount Records would buy the label a few months later.

== Standards ==
- In 1923 the standards "Charleston", "Wolverine Blues", "Kansas City Stomp", and "Tin Roof Blues" were published.
- 1923 also saw the introduction of the pop/jazz standard I Cried For You, music by Arthur Freed and Abe Lyman with lyrics by Gus Arnheim. Lyman had also performed the first recorded version of it. Benny Krueger and His Orchestra had the most popular version of that year as it peaked at number two on the Billboard charts in 1923.

== Births ==
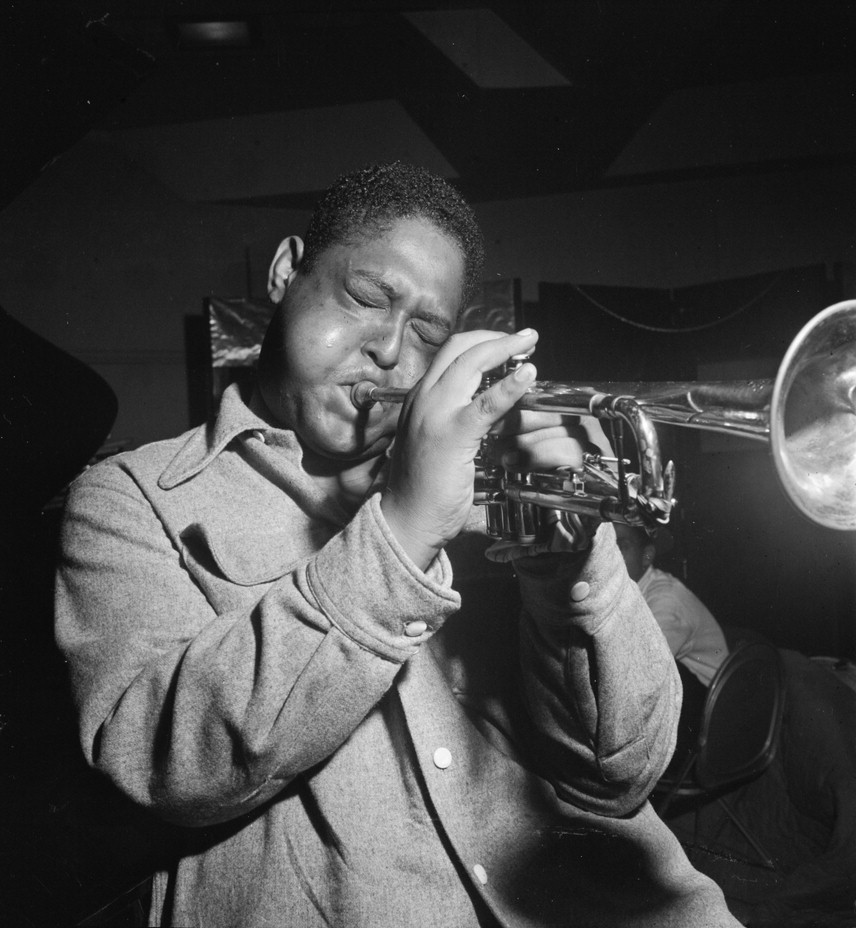
Fats Navarro, ca 1947. Photo by William P. Gottlieb.

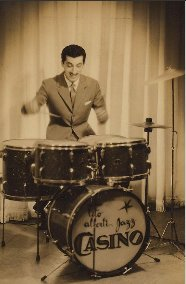
Tito Alberti

January

- 1 – Milt Jackson, American vibraphonist (died 1999).
- 7 – Paul Weeden, American-born Norwegian jazz guitarist (died 2011)
- 8 – Bobby Tucker, American pianist and arranger (died 2008).
- 11 – Osie Johnson, American drummer, arranger and singer (died 1966).
- 12 – Tito Alberti, Argentine drummer (died 2009).
- 20 – Nora Brockstedt, Norwegian singer (died 2015).
- 26 – Talib Dawud, American trumpeter (died 1999).
- 28 – Fausto Papetti, Italian alto saxophonist (died 1999).

February

- 3 – Alys Robi, French Canadian singer (died 2011).
- 5 – Wyatt Ruther, American upright bassist (died 1999).
- 10 – Bob Lively, American saxophonist (died 1994).
- 12
  - Art Mardigan, American drummer (died 1977).
  - Mel Powell, American pianist and composer (died 1998).
- 17 – Buddy DeFranco, American clarinet player (died 2014).
- 27
  - Chuck Wayne, American guitarist (died 1997).
  - Dexter Gordon, American tenor saxophonist (died 1990).
  - Lucille Dixon Robertson, American upright bassist (died 2004).
- 28 – Bill Douglass, American drummer (died 1994).

March

- 4 – Willie Johnson, American guitarist (died 1995).
- 6 – Wes Montgomery, American guitarist and composer (died 1968).
- 10
  - Chris McGale, Canadian violinist (died 2003).
  - Don Abney, American pianist (died 2000).
- 12 – Billy "Uke" Scott, British ukulele player (died 2004).
- 27 – Don Tosti, American musician and composer (died 2004).
- 28
  - Ike Isaacs, American bassist (died 1981).
  - Josette Daydé, French singer and actress (died 1995).
  - Thad Jones, American trumpeter, composer and bandleader (died 1986).
- 29 – Remo Palmier, American guitarist (died 2002).

April

- 1 – Don Butterfield, American tubist (died 2006).
- 13 – Ken Sykora, English guitarist and radio presenter (died 2006).
- 16 – Bennie Green, American trombonist (died 1977).
- 20 – Tito Puente, American musician, songwriter and record producer (died 2000).
- 27 – Lelio Luttazzi, Italian composer, musician, actor, singer, and conductor (died 2010).
- 30 – Percy Heath, American bassist (died 2005).

May

- 4 – Guy Warren, Ghanaian drummer (died 2008).
- 13 – Red Garland, American pianist (died 1984).
- 15 – Ellis Larkins, American pianist (died 2002).
- 21 – Betty Glamann, American harpist (died 1990).
- 25 – Lloyd Trotman, American bassist (died 2007).
- 29 – Eugene Wright, American bassist (died 2020).

June

- 3
  - Al Harewood, American drummer (died 2014).
  - Phil Nimmons, Canadian clarinetist, composer and bandleader (died 2024).
- 23 – George Russell, American pianist (died 2009).
- 26 – Syd Lawrence, British bandleader (died 1998).
- 27 – Elmo Hope, American pianist (died 1967).
- 28
  - Herman Sherman, American saxophonist and bandleader (died 1984).
  - Pete Candoli, American trumpeter (died 2008).

July

- 3 – Johnny Hartman, American singer (died 1983).
- 4 – Aaron Sachs, American saxophonist and clarinetist (died 2014).
- 7 – Kitty White, American singer (died 2009).
- 13 – Norma Zimmer, American vocalist (died 2011).
- 15 – Philly Joe Jones, American drummer (died 1985).
- 23 – Claude Luter, clarinetist and soprano saxophonist (died 2006).
- 28 – Ray Ellis, American record producer, arranger and conductor (died 2008).
- 31 – Bjarne Nerem, Norwegian saxophonist (died 1991).

August

- 6 – Jack Parnell, English producer, bandleader, drummer, and pianist (died 2010).
- 7
  - Idrees Sulieman, American trumpeter (died 2002).
  - Uffe Baadh, Danish-American drummer (died 1980).
- 9 – Margie Hyams, American vibraphonist, pianist, and arranger (died 2012).
- 19 – Dill Jones, Welsh stride pianist (died 1984).

September

- 1 – Bob Bates, American bassist (died 1981).
- 8 – Wilbur Ware, American double-bassist (died 1979).
- 12 – Joe Shulman, American bassist (died 1957).
- 15 – Arvell Shaw, American upright bassist (died 2002).
- 17 – Ralph Sharon, Anglo-American pianist and arranger (died 2015).
- 18 – Frank Socolow, American saxophonist and oboist (died 1981).
- 21 – Fred Hunt, English pianist (died 1986).
- 24 – Fats Navarro, trumpeter and pioneer of bebop (died 1950).
- 25 – Sam Rivers, American multi-instrumentalist and composer (died 2011).

October

- 12 – Wendell Eugene, American trombonist (died 2017).
- 16 – Lenny Hambro, American saxophonist (died 1995).
- 17 – Barney Kessel, American guitarist (died 2004).
- 25 – Don Banks, Australian composer (died 1980).
- 31 – Robert Graettinger, American composer (died 1957).

November

- 11 – Willie Cook, American trumpeter (died 2000).
- 12 – Charlie Mariano, American saxophonist (died 2009).
- 17 – Joe Kennedy Jr., American violinist and educator (died 2004).
- 24 – Serge Chaloff, American baritone saxophonist (died 1957).

December

- 7 – Gunnar Hoffsten, Swedish trumpeter and pianist (died 2010).
- 10 – Linda Hayes, American singer (died 1998).
- 11 – Marky Markowitz, American trumpeter (died 1986).
- 12 – Bob Dorough, American pianist, composer and vocalese singer (died 2018).
- 25 – Paul Bacon, American album cover designer (died 2015).

Unknown date

- Helen Jones Woods, American trombonist, International Sweethearts of Rhythm (died 2020).
- Pat Smythe, Scottish pianist (died 1983).
- Tiny Kahn, American drummer, arranger and composer (died 1953).

== See also ==
- 1923 in music
