= 1908 in jazz =

- Decade: Pre-1920 in jazz
- Music: 1908 in music
- Standards: List of pre-1920 jazz standards
- See also: 1907 in jazz – 1909 in jazz

This is a timeline documenting events of Jazz in the year 1908.

== Events ==
- Trumpeter Freddie Keppard and his Creoles played more powerful Jazz in New Orleans than the Original Dixieland Jazz Band did in 1917. Keppard did not record any records until many years later. He was afraid of having his style stolen.

== Births ==
January

- 1 – Bill Tapia, Portuguese-American singer and ukulele player (died 2011).
- 7 – Red Allen, American trumpeter and vocalist (died 1967).
- 14 – Russ Columbo, American baritone, songwriter, violinist, and actor (died 1934).
- 22 – Teddy McRae, American tenor saxophonist and arranger (died 1999).
- 26 – Stéphane Grappelli, French violinist, Quintette du Hot Club de France (died 1997).
- 27 – Hot Lips Page, American trumpeter, singer, and bandleader (died 1954).

February

- 20 – Seymour Österwall, Swedish tenor saxophonist, bandleader, and composer (died 1981).

March

- 6 – Bill Beason, American drummer (died 1988).
- 7 – Nat Gonella, trumpeter, bandleader and vocalistAmerican (died 1998).
- 15 – Spencer Clark, American bass saxophonist and multi-instrumentalist (died 1998).
- 31 – Red Norvo, American vibraphonist (died 1999).

April

- 2 – Håkan von Eichwald, Finnish-Swedish bandleader and conductor (died 1964).
- 16 – Ray Ventura, French bandleader and pianist (died 1979).
- 20 – Lionel Hampton, American vibraphonist, pianist, percussionist, bandleader, and actor (died 2002).
- 21 – Alfred Lion, German-American record executive, Blue Note Records (died 1987).
- 22 – Kid Howard, American trumpeter (died 1966).

June

- 25 – Jean Robert, Belgian saxophonist (died 1981).

July

- 13 – Ernst van 't Hoff, Dutch pianist and bandleader (died 1955).
- 17 – Fud Candrix, Belgian saxophonist and violinist (died 1974).

August

- 1 – Elmer Crumbley, American trombonist (died 1993).
- 5 – Don Albert, American trumpeter and bandleader (died 1980).
- 11 – Russell Procope, American clarinettist and alto saxophonist (died 1981).
- 18 – Zinky Cohn, American pianist (died 1952).
- 30 – Willie Bryant, American bandleader, vocalist, and disc jockey (died 1964).

September

- 7 – Max Kaminsky, American trumpeter and bandleader (died 1994).
- 10 – Raymond Scott, American composer, band leader, pianist, and electronic instrument inventor (died 1994).
- 13 – Chu Berry, American tenor saxophonist (died 1941).
- 14 – Charlie Beal, American pianist (died 1991).
- 15
  - Kid Sheik, American trumpeter (died 1996).
  - Fred Adison, French vocalist, drummer, and bandleader (died 1996).

October

- 6 – Sammy Price, American pianist and bandleader (died 1992).
- 9 – Lee Wiley, American singer (died 1975).
- 15 – Herman Chittison, American pianist (died 1967).
- 19 – Spike Hughes, British upright bassist, composer, and music journalist (died 1987).

November

- 2 – Bunny Berigan, American trumpeter and bandleader (died 1942).
- 14 – Clancy Hayes, American vocalist, banjoist and guitarist (died 1972).
- 19 – Keg Johnson, American trombonist (died 1967).
- 25 – Harlan Lattimore, African-American singer (died 1980).

December

- 31 – John Kirby, American upright bassist, trombonist, and tubist (died 1952).

Unknown date

- Billy Banks, American singer (died 1967).
