= 1967 in jazz =

- Decade: 1960s in jazz
- Music: 1967 in music
- Standards: List of post-1950 jazz standards
- See also: 1966 in jazz – 1968 in jazz

This is a timeline documenting events of Jazz in the year 1967.

== Events ==
=== June ===
- 12 – The 2nd Montreux Jazz Festival started in Montreux, Switzerland (June 12 – 19).
- 30 – The 14th Newport Jazz Festival started in Newport, Rhode Island (June 30 – July 3).

=== Unknown date ===
- Nina Simone wins female Jazz singer of the year.
- Carla Bley was married to Michael Mantler.

== Album releases ==
- Bill Evans: Further Conversations with Myself
- Pharoah Sanders: Tauhid
- Stan Getz: Sweet Rain
- Sun Ra: Atlantis
- Gary Burton: A Genuine Tong Funeral
- Sam Rivers: Dimensions and Extensions
- Roscoe Mitchell: Old Quartet
- Bill Dixon: Intents and Purposes
- George Russell: Othello Ballet Suite
- Muhal Richard Abrams: Levels and Degrees of Light
- Archie Shepp: The Magic of Ju-Ju
- Jackie McLean: New and Old Gospel
- Roland Kirk: The Inflated Tear
- Frank Wright: Your Prayer
- Spontaneous Music Ensemble: Withdrawal
- Peter Brötzmann Trio: For Adolphe Sax
- Miles Davis: Miles Smiles
- Jackie McLean: Demon's Dance
- Miles Davis: Sorcerer
- Duke Ellington: The Far East Suite
- Gary Burton: Duster
- John Coltrane: Expression
- McCoy Tyner: The Real McCoy
- Wayne Shorter: Schizophrenia
- Lee Konitz: The Lee Konitz Duets
- Paul Bley: Virtuosi
- Lester Bowie: Numbers 1 & 2
- Paul Bley: Ballads
- Charles Tyler: Eastern Man Alone
- Hugh Masekela: Hugh Masekela's Latest
- Hugh Masekela: Hugh Masekela Is Alive and Well at the Whisky (live album)
- Antonio Carlos Jobim: Wave

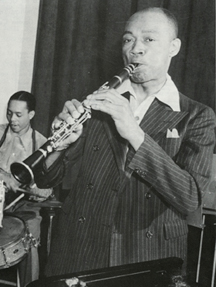
Edmond Hall 1956.

== Deaths ==
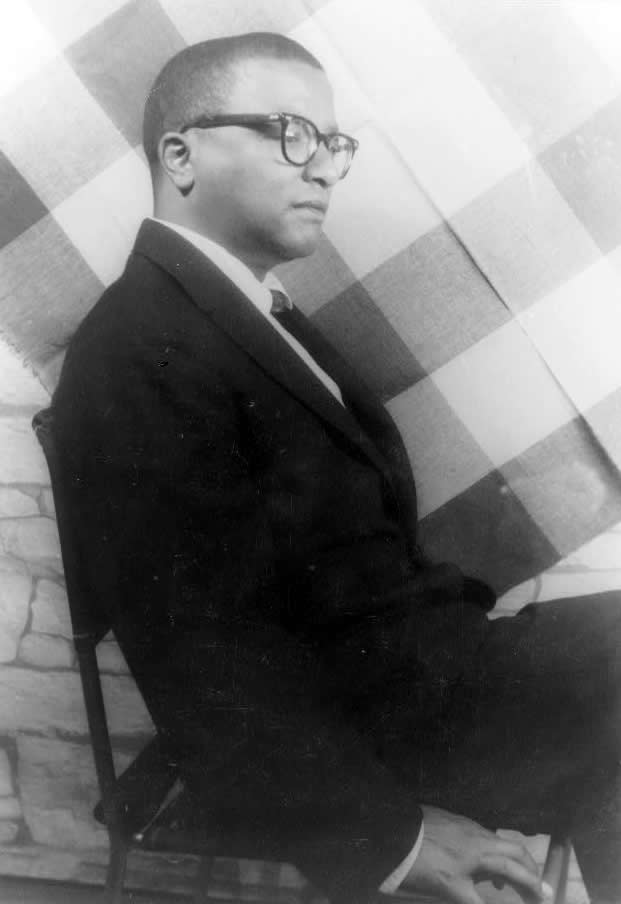
Billy Strayhorn

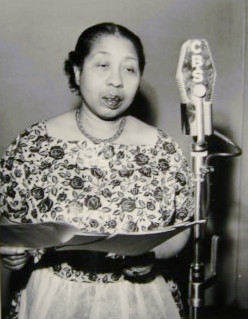
Amanda Randolph at beulah radio 1953/1954.

January

- 9 – Rob Swope, American trombonist (born 1926).

February

- 11
  - Edmond Hall, American clarinetist and bandleader (born 1901).
  - Simon Brehm, Swedish upright bassist (born 1921).
- 12 – Muggsy Spanier, American cornetist (born 1901).
- 25 – Fats Pichon, American pianist, singer, bandleader, and songwriter (born 1906).

March

- 7 – Willie Smith, American saxophonist, clarinetist, and singer (born 1910).
- 8 – Herman Chittison, American pianist (born 1908).
- 23 – Pete Johnson, American pianist (born 1904).

April

- 12 – Buster Bailey, American clarinetist and saxophonist (born 1902).
- 17 – Red Allen, American trumpeter and vocalist (born 1908).

May

- 19 – Elmo Hope, American jazz pianist, composer, and arranger (born 1923).
- 23 – Carl-Henrik Norin, Swedish saxophonist (born 1920).
- 31 – Billy Strayhorn, American composer and pianist (born 1915).

August

- 24 – Amanda Randolph, American actress, singer, and musician (born 1896).

July

- 17 – John Coltrane, American saxophonist and composer (born 1926).

September

- 7 – Rex Stewart, American cornetist, Duke Ellington Orchestra (born 1907).
- 23 – Boots Mussulli, Italian-American jazz saxophonist (born 1915).
- 25 – Stuff Smith, American violinist (born 1909).

October

- 19 – Billy Banks, American singer (born 1908).

November

- 8 – Keg Johnson, American trombonist (born 1908).
- 10 – Ida Cox, African-American singer and vaudeville performer (born 1888).
- 16 – Jimmy Archey, American trombonist (born 1902).

December

- 29 – Paul Whiteman, American bandleader, composer, orchestral director, and violinist (born 1890).

Unknown date

- Randy Brooks, American trumpeter and bandleader (born 1919).

== Births ==
January

- 25 – D. D. Jackson, Canadian pianist and composer.
- 29 – Marc Cary, American pianist.

February

- 3 – Børge Petersen-Øverleir, Norwegian guitarist.
- 7 – Vassilis Tsabropoulos, Greek concert pianist, conductor, and composer.
- 12 – Stein Inge Brækhus, Norwegian drummer.
- 18 – Jeanfrançois Prins, Belgian guitarist and record producer.
- 22 – Audun Erlien, Norwegian bassist.
- 26 – Audun Skorgen, Norwegian bassist.

March

- 13 – Håkon Storm-Mathisen, Norwegian guitarist.
- 31 – Ivar Kolve, Norwegian vibraphonist and percussionist.

April

- 5 – Alex Harding, American saxophonist.
- 14 – Steve Davis, American trombonist.
- 15 – Gerald Gradwohl, Austrian guitarist, Tangerine Dream.
- 16 – Junko Onishi, Japanese pianist.
- 27 – Tommy Smith, Scottish saxophonist, composer and educator.

May

- 18 – Svein Folkvord, Norwegian bassist.
- 23 – Charlie Hunter, American guitarist.
- 29 – Mark Nightingale, English trombonist.
- 31 – Anne Wolf, Belgian pianist.

June

- 1 – Hilaria Kramer, Swiss trumpet, singer, and composer.
- 7 – Lars Gulliksson, Swedish saxophonist and composer.
- 10 – Charnett Moffett, American bassist and composer.

August

- 3 – Jim Black, American drummer.
- 11 – Petter Wettre, Norwegian saxophonist.
- 14 – Rami Eskelinen, Finnish drummer, Trio Töykeät

September

- 6 – Claire Martin, English singer.
- 11 – Harry Connick Jr., American singer and pianist.
- 14 – Majken Christiansen, Danish-Norwegian singer.
- 21 – Duncan Hopkins, English-born composer and bassist.
- 26 – Steffen Schorn, German saxophonist and composer.

October

- 3 – Carsten Dahl, Danish pianist.

November

- 2 – Kurt Elling, American singer, composer, lyricist, and vocalese performer.
- 3
  - Maria Răducanu, Romanian singer and songwriter.
  - Peter Bernstein, American guitarist.
  - Steven Wilson, English progressive rock-musician.
- 19 – Dhafer Youssef, Tunisian composer, singer, and oud player.

December

- Jacob Fischer, Danish guitarist.

Unknown date

- Martha D Lewis, British-Cypriot singer.
- Nikolaj Hess, Danish pianist, composer, producer, and arranger.
- Tom Bancroft, British drummer and composer.

== See also ==
- 1960s in jazz
- List of years in jazz
- 1967 in music

== Bibliography ==
- The New Real Book, Volume I. Sher Music. 1988. ISBN 0-9614701-4-3.
- The New Real Book, Volume II. Sher Music. 1991. ISBN 0-9614701-7-8.
- The New Real Book, Volume III. Sher Music. 1995. ISBN 1-883217-30-X.
- The Real Book, Volume I (6th ed.). Hal Leonard. 2004. ISBN 0-634-06038-4.
- The Real Book, Volume II (2nd ed.). Hal Leonard. 2007. ISBN 978-1-4234-2452-9.
- The Real Book, Volume III (2nd ed.). Hal Leonard. 2006. ISBN 0-634-06136-4.
- The Real Jazz Book. Warner Bros. ISBN 978-91-85041-36-7.
- The Real Vocal Book, Volume I. Hal Leonard. 2006. ISBN 0-634-06080-5.
