= Kaori Kobayashi =

Japanese jazz musician

- Born: October 20, 1981 (age 44)
- Origin: Japan
- Genres: Jazz
- Occupations: Composer, Jazz musician
- Instruments: Saxophone, Flute, Piano
- Years active: 2002–present
- Label: Victor Entertainment
- Website: http://kaorikobayashi.com/

Kaori Kobayashi (小林 香織, Kobayashi Kaori; born October 20, 1981), is a Japanese jazz saxophonist, pianist and flautist. She grew up in Tokyo.

== Biography ==
Kobayashi was born October 20, 1981, in Kanagawa Prefecture. Her father was a photographer and her mother, a piano teacher. Beginning at a very young age, Kobayashi learned to play the piano. When she was 13 years old she joined a brass band and started to play the flute. Four years later she stopped playing in the band, instead choosing to start a relationship with the saxophone. After that she turned to jazz.

After four years, having learned from Bob Zangu how to play the saxophone in a jazz setting, she entered the Senzoku College of Music. After graduating, she got a contract with the label Victor Entertainment and her first album, Solar, appeared.

== Albums ==
- Solar, Kaori's Collection (2005)
- Fine (2006)
- Glow (2007)
- Shiny (2008)
- The Golden Best (2009)
- Luv Sax (2009)
- Precious (2011)
- Seventh (2012)
- Urban Stream (2013)
- Spirit (2014)
- STORY: 10th Anniversary (2015)
- Melody (2016)
- Be myself! (2018)
- NOW and FOREVER (2021)
- INTERSECTION (2024)
