= Roland Batik =

Austrian musician (born 1951)

Roland Batik (born August 19, 1951 in Vienna) is an Austrian pianist, composer, jazz musician and piano teacher. In the style of his compositions, he is seeking a fusion of classical elements with Jazz. Among other, his music is frequently broadcast in the Austrian radio program Ö1.
