= North Sea Jazz Festival =

Annual music festival in Rotterdam, Netherlands

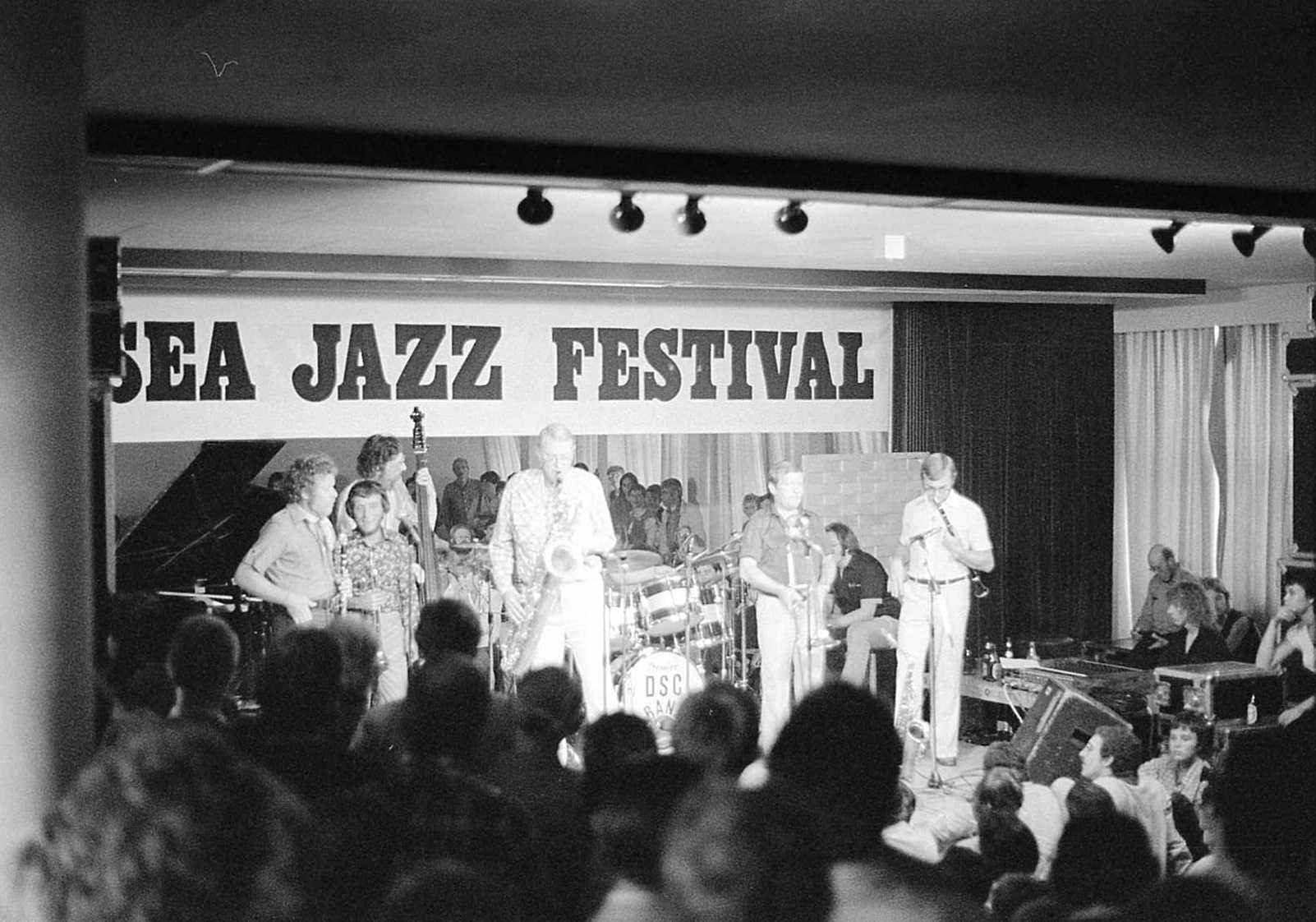
- Genre: Jazz, blues, funk, soul, R&B, hip hop and other genres
- Dates: Second weekend in July
- Locations: Rotterdam Ahoy, Rotterdam, Netherlands
- Coordinates: 51°55′N 4°30′E
- Years active: 1976–present
- Founders: Paul Acket
- Attendance: Approximately 90,000 (2026)
- Website: Official website

The North Sea Jazz Festival, officially the NN North Sea Jazz Festival, is an annual three-day music festival held in July at Rotterdam Ahoy in the Netherlands. From 1976 to 2005, it took place at the Congresgebouw, now the World Forum Convention Center, in The Hague. Its programme includes jazz and related genres such as blues, soul, funk, R&B, hip hop, world music and pop. Since 2018, the festival has officially been known as the NN North Sea Jazz Festival.

== History ==
=== Origins and early years ===
The festival was founded by Paul Acket, a businessman, jazz enthusiast and publisher of the Dutch music magazines Muziek Expres and Popfoto. Acket had organised jazz concerts in The Hague since the early 1950s and was responsible for Miles Davis' first Dutch performance in 1956. In 1974, he sold his publishing company to VNU and used the proceeds to establish a multi-day jazz festival, inspired by La Grande Parade du Jazz in Nice.

Before founding North Sea Jazz, Acket organised the Rotterdam edition of the Newport Jazz Festival in Europe. The first Dutch edition was held at De Doelen in 1966.

The first North Sea Jazz Festival opened at the Congresgebouw in The Hague on 16 July 1976. It featured six halls, 300 musicians and approximately 9,000 visitors. Its programme combined American jazz and blues with Dutch avant-garde, including Sarah Vaughan, Count Basie, Dizzy Gillespie, Stan Getz and Ray Charles, as well as the Willem Breuker Kollektief and the duo of Misha Mengelberg and Han Bennink.

Following Acket's death in 1992, the festival's organisation was taken over by concert promoter Mojo Concerts, which had already been involved with the festival for several years.

By 2026, the festival had grown to seventeen stages, approximately 1,300 musicians and about 90,000 visitors. Artists who have performed at the festival include Ella Fitzgerald, Nina Simone, Lionel Hampton, Miles Davis, George Benson, Herbie Hancock, Wayne Shorter, Wynton Marsalis, Tony Bennett, James Brown, B.B. King, Eric Clapton, Van Morrison, Stevie Wonder, Prince, Chaka Khan, Erykah Badu, D'Angelo, Amy Winehouse, Alicia Keys, Diana Ross, Jamiroquai and Candy Dulfer. According to the festival organisation, European audiences were first introduced there to artists including Shirley Horn, Tania Maria, Roy Hargrove, Rachelle Ferrell and Gregory Porter.

=== Move to Rotterdam ===
In 2006, the festival moved from the Congresgebouw in The Hague to Rotterdam Ahoy. The move followed plans to demolish the Statenhal and several smaller halls at the Congresgebouw. A proposal by the Municipality of The Hague to use temporary tents was not considered an acceptable alternative by the festival organisation. In its first year at Ahoy, the festival had thirteen stages; festival director Theo van den Hoek said that the venue offered more space than the Congresgebouw.

Since the move, the city festival North Sea Round Town has been organised in Rotterdam in the run-up to North Sea Jazz, presenting jazz concerts at locations across the city.

=== Recent history ===
The festival did not take place in 2020 or 2021 because of the COVID-19 pandemic in the Netherlands. In 2020, a concert by the Metropole Orkest was broadcast as North Sea Jazz 2020 in Concert: Metropole Orkest & Friends. In 2021, concerts were organised at Bird, De Doelen, LantarenVenster and RTM Stage at Rotterdam Ahoy as NN North Sea Jazz Downtown. The live concerts were also streamed free of charge through the festival website, which also made concert recordings from the festival's television archives available that weekend.

In 2026, the festival marked fifty years since its first edition. The anniversary programme included the photography exhibition 50 Jaar North Sea Jazz Fotografie. Queen Máxima officially opened the festival on 10 July 2026.

== Programme features ==
Since 1985, the festival has presented the Paul Acket Award, known as the Bird Award until 2006. It is awarded to a jazz musician considered deserving of wider public recognition for exceptional musical quality.

Since 2001, the festival has commissioned promising Dutch jazz composers to write new work for performance at the festival.

The festival introduced its Artist in Residence programme in 2001, with George Duke as its first resident artist. He performed in different line-ups over the festival's three days. In 2011, the Artist in Residence was replaced by Carte Blanche programmes for Kyteman and Rudresh Mahanthappa. In 2013, the festival instead gave Steve Coleman and John Zorn the opportunity to programme an evening each.

The festival's first art poster was designed by Rafał Olbiński in 1981; he also designed the poster for 1982. In its early years, the festival commissioned artists to design its posters. Since the move to Rotterdam in 2006, it has organised an annual Art Poster Competition for students at the Willem de Kooning Academy in Rotterdam. The finalists' work is exhibited at Ahoy during the festival.

The wider programme has also included clinics, artist interviews, an Open Stage and visual art.

== Curaçao North Sea Jazz Festival ==
Since 2010, the Curaçao North Sea Jazz Festival has also taken place. It was initiated by Fundashon Bon Intenshon, is produced by Mojo Concerts and is traditionally held during the Labor Day weekend.
