= 1965 in jazz =

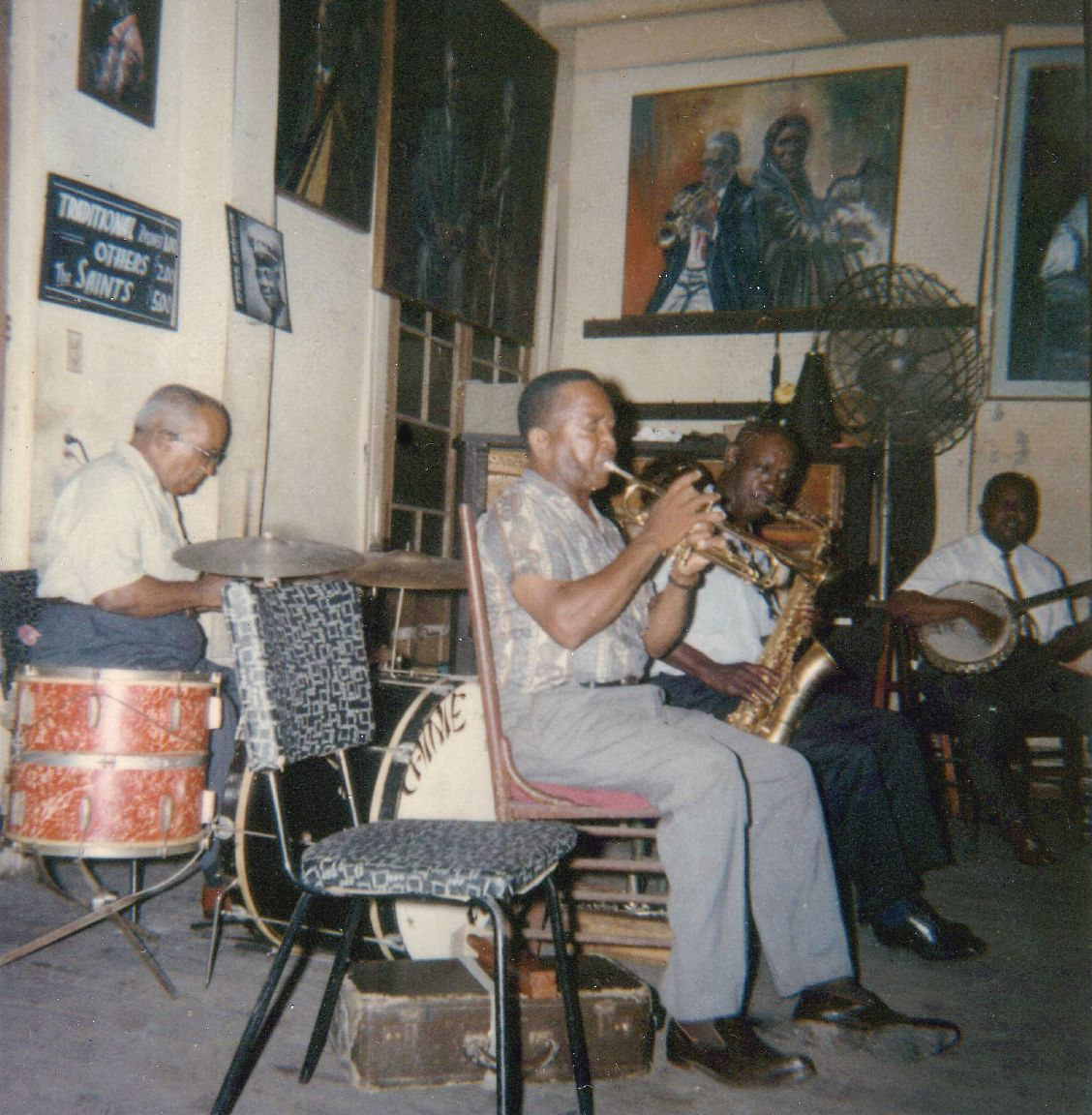
- Jazz band playing at Preservation Hall, New Orleans, 1965, including Kid Sheik Colar, Captain John Handy, and drummer Alex Bigard.
- Decade: 1960s in jazz
- Music: 1965 in music
- Standards: List of post-1950 jazz standards
- See also: 1964 in jazz – 1966 in jazz

This is a timeline documenting events of Jazz in the year 1965.

== Events ==
=== July ===
- 1 – The 12th Newport Jazz Festival started in Newport, Rhode Island (July 1 – 4).

=== Unknown dates ===
- Ronnie Scott's Jazz Club opens in larger premises at 47 Frith Street, in London's Soho district.
- Carla Bley divorced Paul Bley.

== Album releases ==
- Andrew Hill: Compulsion
- Archie Shepp: Fire Music
- Ben Webster: Stormy Weather
- Bobby Hutcherson: Components
- Bobby Hutcherson: Dialogue
- Don Cherry: Complete Communion
- Eddie Palmieri: Mozambique
- Frank Wright: Frank Wright Trio
- Gabor Szabo: Gypsy
- George Finola: Jazz Of The Chosen Few
- Herbie Hancock: Maiden Voyage
- Horace Silver: The Cape Verdean Blues
- Horace Silver: Song for My Father
- John Coltrane: A Love Supreme
- John Coltrane: The John Coltrane Quartet Plays
- Lee Morgan: Cornbread
- Lee Morgan: The Gigolo
- Marion Brown: Marion Brown Quartet
- Milford Graves: Percussion Ensemble
- Wes Montgomery: Bumpin'
- New York Art Quartet: Mohawk
- Ornette Coleman: Chappaqua Suite
- Patty Waters: Sings
- Prince Lasha: Inside Story
- Roland Kirk: Rip, Rig and Panic
- Roswell Rudd: Roswell Rudd
- Sam Rivers: Contours
- Sun Ra: The Heliocentric Worlds of Sun Ra, Volume Two
- Sun Ra: The Magic City
- Vince Guaraldi: A Charlie Brown Christmas
- Wayne Shorter: The All Seeing Eye
- Wayne Shorter: Soothsayer

== Deaths ==
January

- 29 – Jack Hylton, English pianist, composer, band leader, and impresario (born 1892).

February

- 12 – Bonnie Wetzel, American upright bassist (born 1926).
- 15 – Nat King Cole, American pianist and singer (born 1919).

March

- 8 – Tadd Dameron, American composer, arranger, and pianist (born 1917).

May

- 1 – Spike Jones, American musician and bandleader (born 1911).
- 14 – Joe Sanders, American pianist, singer, and bandleader (born 1896).
- 24 – Denzil Best, American percussionist and composer (born 1917).

June

- 25 – Keg Purnell, American drummer (born 1915).

July

- 1 – Claude Thornhill, American pianist, arranger, composer, and bandleader (born 1909).
- 4 – Valdemar Eiberg, Danish musician and orchestra leader (born 1892).
- 8 – Willie Dennis, American trombonist (born 1926).
- 14 – Spencer Williams, African-American pianist, singer, and composer (born 1889).

August

- 10 – Freddie Slack, American pianist, composer, and bandleader (born 1910).

September

- 15 – Steve Brown, American upright bassist (born 1896).

October

- 10 – Gerorge Tucker, American upright bassist (born 1927).
- 27 – Edythe Wright, American singer (born 1914).
- 28 – Earl Bostic, American alto saxophonist (born 1913).

November

- 6 – Clarence Williams, American pianist, vocalist, and composer (born 1898).
- 14 – Buster Harding, Canadian-born American pianist (born 1912).
- 18 – Lou Black, American banjo player (born 1901).
- 21 – Cecil Brower, American violinist (perforated ulcer) (born 1914).
- Warren Tartaglia, American saxophonist (born 1944).

December

- 2 – Hank D'Amico, American clarinetist (born 1915).
- 11 – Dave Barbour, American guitarist (born 1912).
- 20 – Charlie Burse, American ukulele, banjo, and guitar player (born 1901).
- 26 – Peter Packay, Belgian trumpeter, arranger, and composer (born 1904).

== Births ==
January

- 1 – Miki Higashino, Japanese pianist and video game composer.
- 3 – Sheila Majid, Malaysian singer.
- 19 – Antonio Faraò, Italian pianist.

February

- 13 – Ole Mathisen, Norwegian saxophonist.
- 24 – Tone Åse, Norwegian singer.
- 27 – Joey Calderazzo, American pianist.

March

- 2 – Wolfgang Muthspiel, Austrian guitarist and record label owner.
- 8 – Karin Mensah, Cape Verdean singer.
- 12 – Liv Stoveland, Norwegian singer.
- 22 – David Linx, Belgian singer and songwriter.
- 24 – Patrick Scales, British-German bass guitarist.

April

- 7 – Sylvain Luc, French guitarist.
- 10 – Omar Sosa, Cuban composer, bandleader, and pianist.
- 20 – Darko Jurković, Croatian guitarist and composer.
- 29 – Rain Sultanov, Azerbaijani saxophonist.

May

- 3 – Magnus Öström, Swedish drummer, Esbjörn Svensson Trio or e.s.t.
- 10 – Philip Harper, American trumpeter.
- 16 – Javon Jackson, American tenor saxophonist.

June

- 3
  - Derrick Gardner, American trumpeter.
  - Mirko Fait, Italian saxophonist and composer.
- 9 – Helge Sunde, Norwegian trombonist and multi-instrumentalist.
- 27 – Magnus Broo, Swedish trumpeter, Atomic.

July

- 5 – Eyran Katsenelenbogen, Israeli pianist.
- 16 – Odd André Elveland, Norwegian saxophonist.
- 19 – Evelyn Glennie, Scottish percussionist.
- 28 – Delfeayo Marsalis, American trombonist and record producer.

August

- 4 – Terri Lyne Carrington, American drummer, composer, singer, record producer, and entrepreneur.
- 6 – Ravi Coltrane, American saxophonist.
- 21 – Leon Parker, American percussionist and composer.
- 29 – Mark d'Inverno, British pianist, composer, and computer scientist.

September

- 5 – Björn Meyer, Swedish bassist and composer.
- 11 – Jesse Davis, American saxophonist.
- 24 – Njål Ølnes, Norwegian saxophonist.
- 28 – Hans Ulrik, Danish saxophonist, and composer.

October

- 9 – Geir Lysne, Norwegian saxophonist and orchestra leader.
- 12 – Luis Bonilla, American trombonist, producer, composer and educator.
- 18 – Curtis Stigers, American vocalist, saxophonist, guitarist, and songwriter.

November

- 2 – Andrew D'Angelo, American saxophonist.
- 10 – Mark Turner, American saxophonist.
- 21 – Björk, Icelandic singer-songwriter.

December

- 5 – Hildegunn Øiseth, Norwegian trumpeter and hornist.
- 7 – Wolfgang Haffner, German drummer.
- 29 – Danilo Perez, Panamanian pianist and composer.
- 30 – Ron Affif, American guitarist.

Unknown date

- Arturo Tappin, Barbadian saxophonist and composer.
- Bradley Joseph, American pianist.
- Helge Andreas Norbakken, Norwegian percussionist.
- Kostas Theodorou, Greek upright bassist, multi-instrumentalist, and composer.

== See also ==
- 1960s in jazz
- List of years in jazz
- 1965 in music

== Bibliography ==
- The New Real Book, Volume I. Sher Music. 1988. ISBN 0-9614701-4-3.
- The New Real Book, Volume II. Sher Music. 1991. ISBN 0-9614701-7-8.
- The New Real Book, Volume III. Sher Music. 1995. ISBN 1-883217-30-X.
- The Real Book, Volume I (6th ed.). Hal Leonard. 2004. ISBN 0-634-06038-4.
- The Real Book, Volume II (2nd ed.). Hal Leonard. 2007. ISBN 978-1-4234-2452-9.
- The Real Book, Volume III (2nd ed.). Hal Leonard. 2006. ISBN 0-634-06136-4.
- The Real Jazz Book. Warner Bros. ISBN 978-91-85041-36-7.
- The Real Vocal Book, Volume I. Hal Leonard. 2006. ISBN 0-634-06080-5.
