= 1977 in jazz =

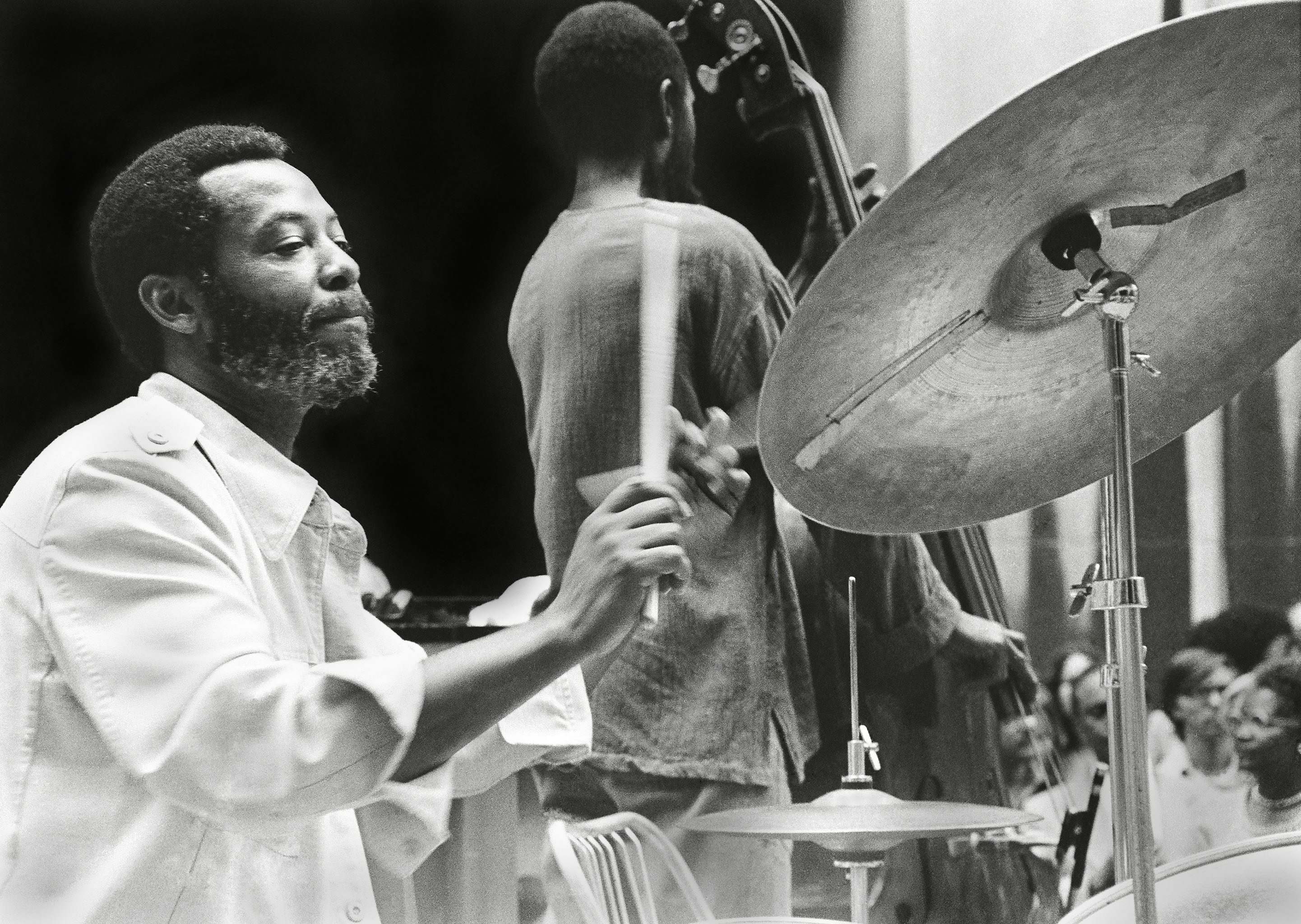
- Ben Riley Heath Brothers concert Rockefeller Center, NYC June 1977
- Decade: 1970s in jazz
- Music: 1977 in music
- Standards: List of post-1950 jazz standards
- See also: 1976 in jazz – 1978 in jazz

This is a timeline documenting events of Jazz in the year 1977.

== Events ==
=== April ===
- 1 – The 4th Vossajazz started in Vossavangen, Norway (April 1 – 3).

=== May ===
- 25 – The 5th Nattjazz started in Bergen, Norway (May 25 – June 8).
- 27 – The 6th Moers Festival started in Moers, Germany (May 27 – 30).

=== June ===
- 24 – The 24th Newport Jazz Festival started in Newport, Rhode Island (June 24 – July 4).

=== July ===
- 1 – The 11th Montreux Jazz Festival started in Montreux, Switzerland (July 1 – 24).
- 15 – The 2nd North Sea Jazz Festival started in The Hague, Netherlands (July 15 – 17).

=== September ===
- 16 – The 20th Monterey Jazz Festival started in Monterey, California (September 16 – 18).

== Album releases ==
- Muhal Richard Abrams: 1-OQA+19
- Air: Air Time
- Neil Ardley: Kaleidoscope of Rainbows
- Derek Bailey: Company 5
- Arthur Blythe: Metamorphosis
- Hamiet Bluiett: Birthright
- Hamiet Bluiett: SOS
- Joanne Brackeen: AFT
- Joanne Brackeen: Tring-a-Ling
- Al Di Meola: Elegant Gypsy
- Michael Franks: Sleeping Gypsy
- Chico Freeman: Chico
- Chico Freeman: Kings of Mali
- Chico Freeman: No Time Left
- David Friesen: Waterfall Rainbow
- Jan Garbarek: Places
- Gateway Trio: Gateway 2
- Vinny Golia: Spirits In Fellowship
- Globe Unity: Pearls
- Louis Hayes: The Real Thing
- Julius Hemphill: Blue Boyé
- Julius Hemphill: Raw Materials and Residuals
- Julius Hemphill: Roi Boyé & the Gotham Minstrels
- Dave Holland: Emerald Tears
- Keith Jarrett: My Song
- Leroy Jenkins: Lifelong Ambitions
- Leroy Jenkins: Solo Concert
- Sheila Jordan: Sheila
- Ernie Krivda: Satanic
- Steve Lacy: Raps
- Art Lande: Desert Marauders
- George Lewis: Chicago Slow Dance
- George Lewis: Shadowgraph
- Frank Lowe: Lowe and Behold
- Michael Mantler: Movies
- Chuck Mangione: Feels So Good
- Hugh Masekela: You Told Your Mama Not to Worry
- Cecil McBee: Music from the Source
- Joe McPhee: Graphics
- Pat Metheny: Watercolors
- Roscoe Mitchell: Nonaah
- Paul Motian: Dance
- Art Pepper: No Limit
- Jean-Luc Ponty: Enigmatic Ocean
- George Russell: Vertical Form 6
- Irene Schweizer: Hexensabbat
- John Scofield: East Meets West
- Woody Shaw: Rosewood
- John Tchicai: Real
- Radka Toneff: Fairytales
- Ralph Towner: Sound and Shadows
- McCoy Tyner: Supertrios
- James Ulmer: Revealing
- Michael Urbaniak: Urbaniak
- Abdul Wadud: By Myself
- Collin Walcott: Grazing Dreams
- Weather Report: Heavy Weather
- Kenny Wheeler: Deer Wan
- World Saxophone Quartet: Point Of No Return
- Tommy Turk: The-Truth!!!

== Deaths ==
January

- 2 – Erroll Garner, American pianist and composer (born 1923).
- 22 – Maysa Matarazzo, Brazilian singer, composer, and actress (born 1936).

February

- 9 – Buddy Johnson, American pianist and bandleader (born 1915).
- Billy Taylor Jr., American upright bassist (born 1925).
- Julian Gould, American organist, pianist, and composer (born 1915).

March

- 23 – Bennie Green, American trombonist (born 1923).
- 27 – Benny Moten, American upright bassist (born 1916).

April

- 4 – Julius Watkins, American French hornist (born 1921).
- 7 – Moon Mullens, American trumpeter (born 1916).
- 21 – Joe Garland, American saxophonist, composer, and arranger, "In the Mood" (born 1903).

May

- 22 – Hampton Hawes, American pianist (born 1928).
- 30 – Paul Desmond, American alto saxophonist and composer (born 1924).

June

- 6 – Art Mardigan, American drummer (born 1923).

July

- 22 – Richie Kamuca, American jazz tenor saxophonist (born 1930).
- 27 – Milt Buckner, American jazz pianist and organist (born 1915).

September

- 3 – Paloma Efron, Argentine singer (born 1912).
- 5 – George Barnes, American guitarist (born 1921).

October

- 16 – Milt Raskin, American pianist (born 1916).

November

- 18 – Teddi King, American vocalist (born 1929).
- 19 – Sonny Criss, American alto saxophonist (born 1927).

December

- 5 – Rahsaan Roland Kirk, American saxophonist and multi-instrumentalist (born 1935).
- 27 – Sam Brown, American guitarist (born 1939).

Unknown date

- J. C. Moses, American drummer (born 1936).

== Births ==
January

- 8 – Torun Eriksen, Norwegian singer.
- 10 – Rhian Benson, Ghanaian-British singer and songwriter.
- 13 – Elliot Mason, English trombonist.
- 28 – Sissel Vera Pettersen, Norwegian singer, saxophonist, and composer.
- 31 – Per Zanussi, Italians–Norwegian upright bassist, composer, and band leader, Wibutee.

February

- 2 – Evelina De Lain, Ukrainian-English pianist, composer, and arranger.
- 10 – Shahin Novrasli, Azerbaijani pianist.

March

- 4
  - Jason Marsalis, American drummer, vibraphonist, and composer.
  - Dan Weiss, American drummer and composer.
- 6 – Kirsti Huke, Norwegian singer and composer.
- 8 – Jef Neve, Belgian pianist and composer.
- 10 – Torstein Lofthus, Norwegian drummer and composer.
- 21 – Farnell Newton, American composer and trumpeter.
- 26 – Håvard Stubø, Norwegian guitarist.
- 30 – Tor Egil Kreken, Norwegian bass, banjo, and guitar player, Wibutee and Shining.

April

- 5 – Håkon Kornstad, Norwegian tenor saxophonist and operatic tenor.
- 21 – Andrea Veneziani, Italian upright bassist, composer, and arranger.
- 28 – Asbjørn Lerheim, Norwegian guitarist and music teacher.
- 30 – Ole Jørn Myklebust, Norwegian trumpeter, flugelhornist and vocalist.

May

- 10 – Jasper Høiby, Danish upright bassist, Phronesis.
- 11 – Nicolai Munch-Hansen, Danish bassist and composer (died 2017).
- 23 – Mads Berven, Norwegian guitarist.

June

- 8 – Frøy Aagre, Norwegian saxophonist.
- 9 – Atle Nymo, Norwegian saxophonist, Motif and Trondheim Jazz Orchestra.
- 11 – Ozan Musluoğlu, Turkish upright bassist and bass guitarist, Athena.
- 30 – Brynjar Rasmussen, Norwegian clarinetist.

July

- 4 – Sevda Alekbarzadeh, Azerbaijani female singer.
- 11 – Will Vinson, English alto saxophonist and composer, OWL Trio.

August

- 18 – Even Kruse Skatrud, Norwegian trombonist, Funky Butt.
- 27 – Quincy Davis, American drummer.

September

- 1 – Sinne Eeg, Danish singer.
- 13 – Julius Lind, Norwegian upright bassist.
- 20
  - Dan Cray, American pianist.
  - Martin Horntveth, Norwegian drummer, composer and electronica artist, Jaga Jazzist.

October

- 2 – David Wallumrød, Norwegian pianist and organist, Needlepoint.
- 6 – Matthew Bourne, British pianist and cellist.

November

- 1 – Anine Kruse, Norwegian singer and choral conductor, Pitsj.
- 3 – Jane Monheit, American singer.
- 5 – Ida Sand, Swedish singer and pianist.
- 20 – Florian Weber, German pianist and composer.

December

- 12 – Lage Lund, Norwegian guitarist.
- 23
  - Tore Johansen, Norwegian trumpeter and composer.
  - Verneri Pohjola, Finnish trumpeter.

Unknown date

- Andreas Haddeland, Norwegian guitarist.
- Giuliano Modarelli, Italian guitarist.
- Tomeka Reid, American cellist and improvisational musician.

== See also ==
- 1970s in jazz
- List of years in jazz
- 1977 in music
