= 1917 in jazz =

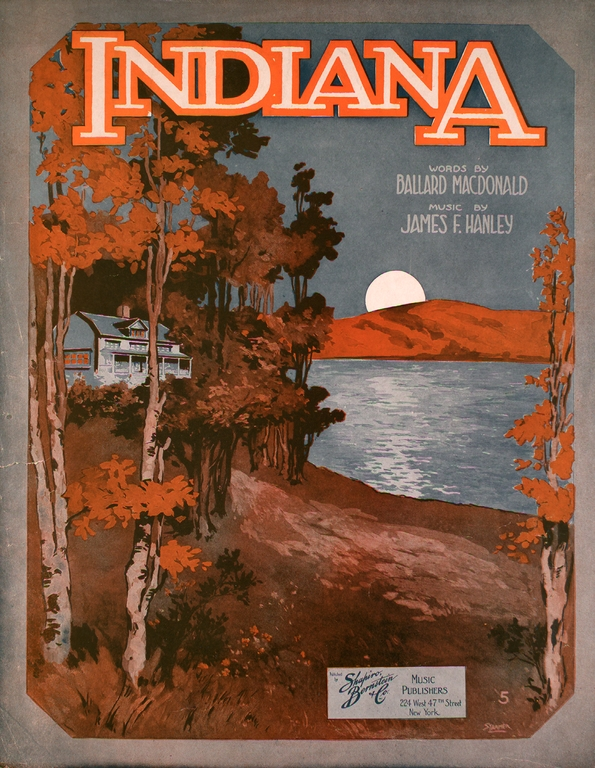
- Hanley and MacDonald's "Indiana" (1917) is one of the most popular pre-1920s standards.
- Decade: Pre-1920 in jazz
- Music: 1917 in music
- Standards: List of pre-1920 jazz standards
- See also: 1916 in jazz – 1918 in jazz

This is a timeline documenting events of Jazz in the year 1917.

Musicians born in this year included Dizzy Gillespie, Ella Fitzgerald and Thelonious Monk.

== Events ==
=== February ===
- 26 – The Original Dixieland Jazz Band records the first jazz album, Livery Stable Blues. It was a success and paved the way for the first jazz records in US music shops.

== Standards ==
- In 1917 standards such as "Indiana" and "Tiger Rag" appeared.

== Deaths ==
April

- 1 – Scott Joplin, American composer and pianist (born 1868).

== Births ==
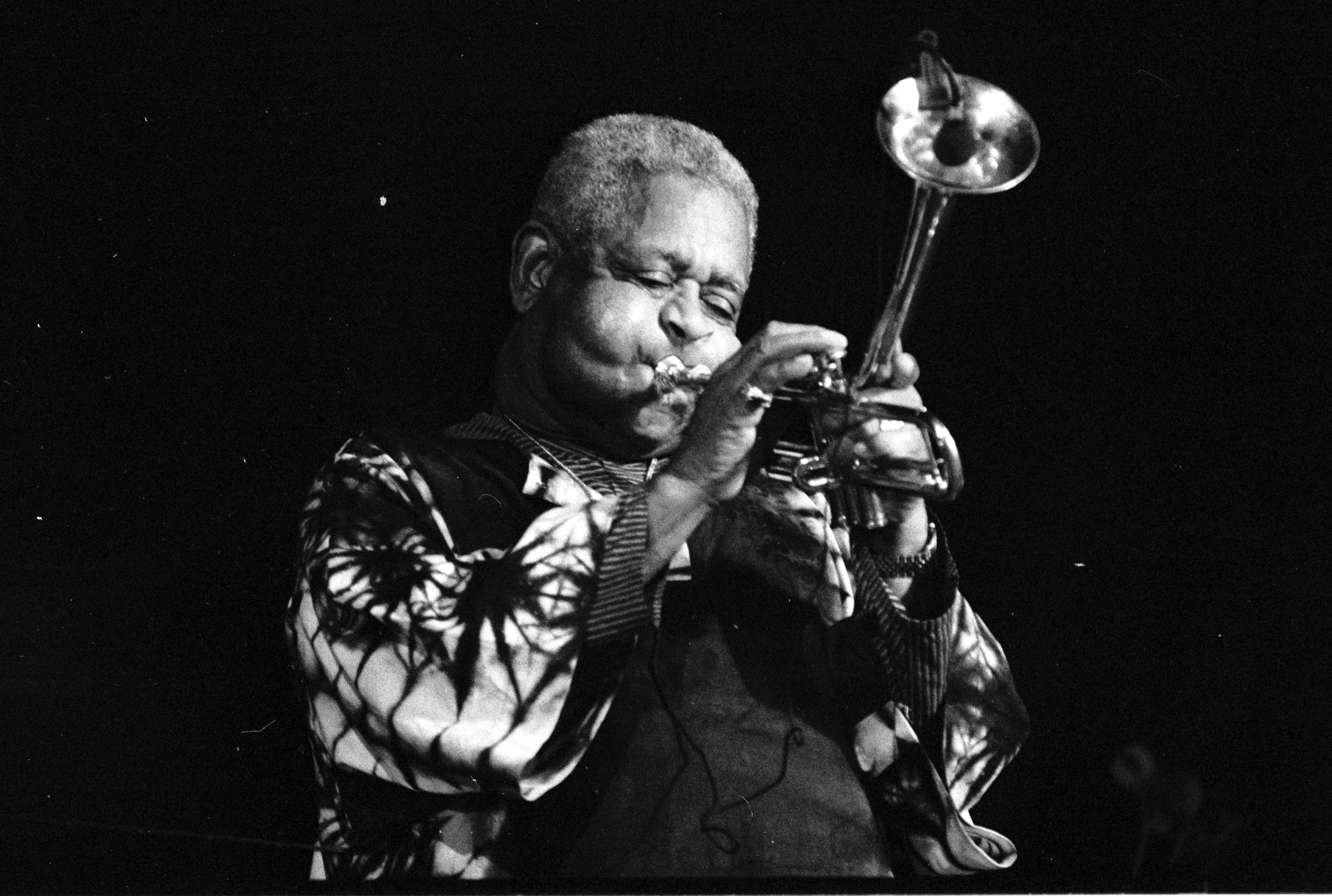
Dizzy Gillespie in concert in Deauville, Normandy, France

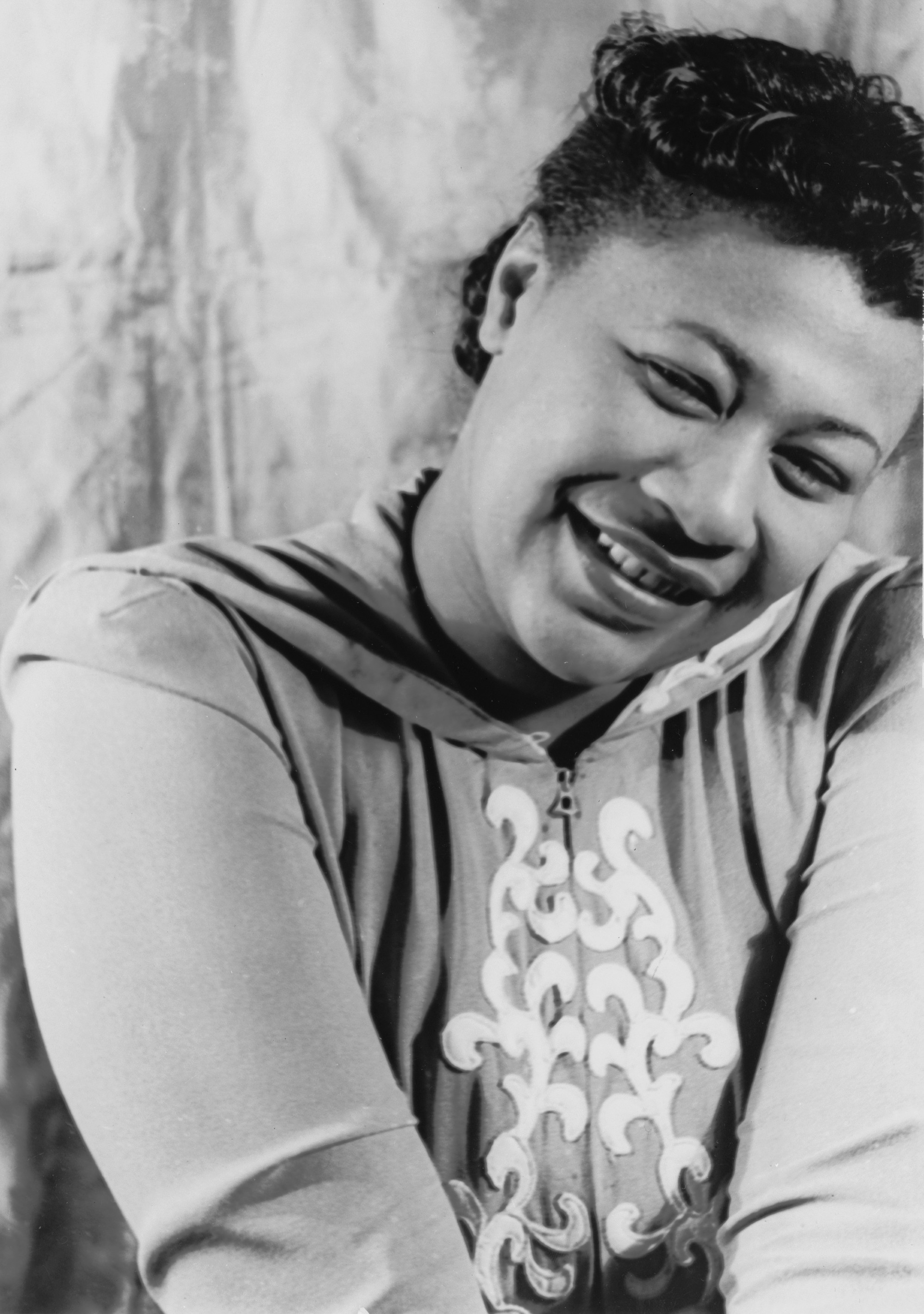
Ella Fitzgerald photo by Carl Van Vechten, 1940

January

- 9 – Jimmy Maxwell, American trumpeter (died 2002).
- 10 – Jerry Wexler, American music journalist and music producer (died 2008).
- 14 – Billy Butterfield, American band leader, trumpeter, flugelhornist and cornetist (died 1988).
- 16 – Sandy Block, American bassist (died 1985).
- 19
  - Shep Shepherd, American drummer and trombonist (died 2018).
  - Streamline Ewing, American jazz trombonist (died 2002).
- 21 – Billy Maxted, American pianist (died 2001).
- 22 – Pud Brown, American reedist (died 1996).
- 23 – Fred Beckett, American trombonist (died 1946).
- 24 – Avery Parrish, American pianist and songwriter (died 1959).
- 25 – Floyd Smith, American guitarist and record producer (died 1982).

February

- 21 – Tadd Dameron, American pianist and composer (died 1965).
- 23 – John Benson Brooks, American pianist, songwriter, arranger, and composer (died 1999).
- 28 – Max Jones, British jazz author, radio host, and journalist (died 1993).

March

- 1 – Aimé Barelli, French trumpeter, vocalist, and band leader (died 1995).
- 14 – John Graas, American French horn player, composer, and arranger (died 1962).
- 16 – Junior Raglin, American upright bassist (died 1955).
- 19
  - Buster Harding, Canadian-American pianist, composer, and arranger (died 1965).
  - Curley Russell, American upright bassist (died 1986).
- 23 – Johnny Guarnieri, American virtuoso jazz and stride pianist (died 1985).
- 27 – Dardanelle Hadley, American singer, vibraphonist, pianist, composer, and arranger (died 1997).

April

- 3 – Bill Finegan, American bandleader, pianist, arranger, and composer (died 2008).
- 7 – Mongo Santamaría, Afro-Cuban percussionist (died 2003).
- 10 – Morty Corb, American upright bassist (died 1996).
- 12 – Helen Forrest, American singer (died 1999).
- 21 – Joe Dixon, American reedist (died 1998).
- 25 – Ella Fitzgerald, American vocalist (died 1996).
- 27 – Denzil Best, American percussionist and composer (died 1965).
- 30
  - Bea Wain, American singer (died 2017).
  - Frankie Lee Sims, American singer-songwriter and guitarist (died 1970).

May

- 5 – Dalva de Oliveira, Brazilian singer (internal bleeding) (died 1972).
- 22 – Charlie Munro, New Zealand-Australian reedist and flautist (died 1985).
- 25 – Jimmy Hamilton, American clarinetist, tenor saxophonist, and composer (died 1995).
- 31 – Billie Rogers, American trumpeter and singer (died 2014).

June

- 7 – Dean Martin, American singer, actor, comedian, and film producer (died 1995).
- 13 – Si Zentner, American trombonist and big band leader (died 2000).
- 19 – Dave Lambert, American lyricist and singer (died 1966).

July

- 18
  - Henri Salvador, French-Caribbean comedian and singer (died 2008).
  - Joe Comfort, American bassist (died 1988).
- 22 – Lou McGarity, American trombonist, violinist and vocalist (died 1971).

August

- 3
  - Charlie Shavers, American trumpeter (died 1971).
  - Les Elgart, American bandleader and trumpeter (died 1995).
- 7 – Mose Vinson, American pianist and singer (died 2002).
- 10 – J. C. Heard, American drummer (died 1988).
- 30 – Lena Horne, African-American singer, dancer, actress, and civil rights activist (died 2010).

September

- 2
  - Armando Trovajoli, Italian film composer and pianist (died 2013).
  - Laurindo Almeida, Brazilian virtuoso guitarist and composer (died 1995).
- 6 – Johnny Letman, American trumpeter (died 1992).
- 11 – John Adriano Acea, American pianist (died 1963).
- 24 – Jimmy Butts, American upright bassist (died 1998).
- 26 – Nelson Williams, American jazz trumpeter (died 1973).
- 30 – Buddy Rich, American jazz drummer and bandleader (died 1987).

October

- 10 – Thelonious Monk, American pianist and composer (died 1982).
- 16 – Pat Flowers, American pianist and singer (died 2000).
- 21 – Dizzy Gillespie, trumpeter and bandleader (died 1993).
- 24 – Mike Pedicin, American saxophonist and bandleader (died 2016).

November

- 7 – Howard Rumsey, American upright bassist (died 2015).
- 11 – Sonny White, American pianist (died 1971).
- 18 – Boots Mussulli, Italian-American saxophonist (died 1967).

December

- 2 – Sylvia Syms (singer), American singer (died 1992).
- 4 – Russell Jacquet, American trumpeter (died 1990).
- 18 – Eddie Vinson, American alto saxophonist and blues shouter (died 1988).

Unknown date

- Garnet Clark, American jazz pianist (died 1938).
