= 1915 in jazz =

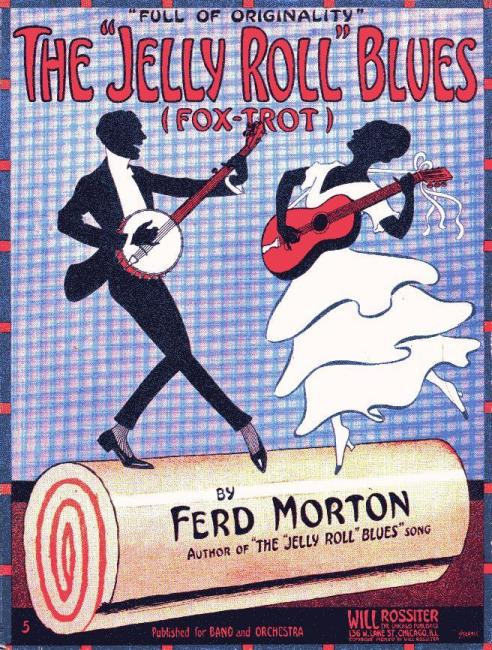
- Jelly Roll Morton published "Jelly Roll Blues" in 1915, the first jazz work in print.
- Decade: Pre-1920 in jazz
- Music: 1915 in music
- Standards: List of pre-1920 jazz standards
- See also: 1914 in jazz – 1916 in jazz

This is a timeline documenting events of Jazz in the year 1915.

== Events ==
- The exact year in which the musical style called jazz began is subject to debate, as are the origins of the word and what exactly qualifies as jazz. Certainly, the term had come to be used by 1915 for a form of music based on New Orleans Ragtime music. Some of the earliest standards first appeared in 1915, and some musicians who went on to become famous in the golden age of jazz were born in that year.
- Tom Brown's band from New Orleans goes to Chicago, Illinois and start advertising themselves as a "Jas Band"

== Standards ==
- Some credit the first jazz recordings to Afro-Creole pianist Jelly Roll Morton. His "Jelly Roll Blues", which he composed around 1905, was published in 1915 as the first jazz arrangement in print, introducing more musicians to the New Orleans style.

== Births ==
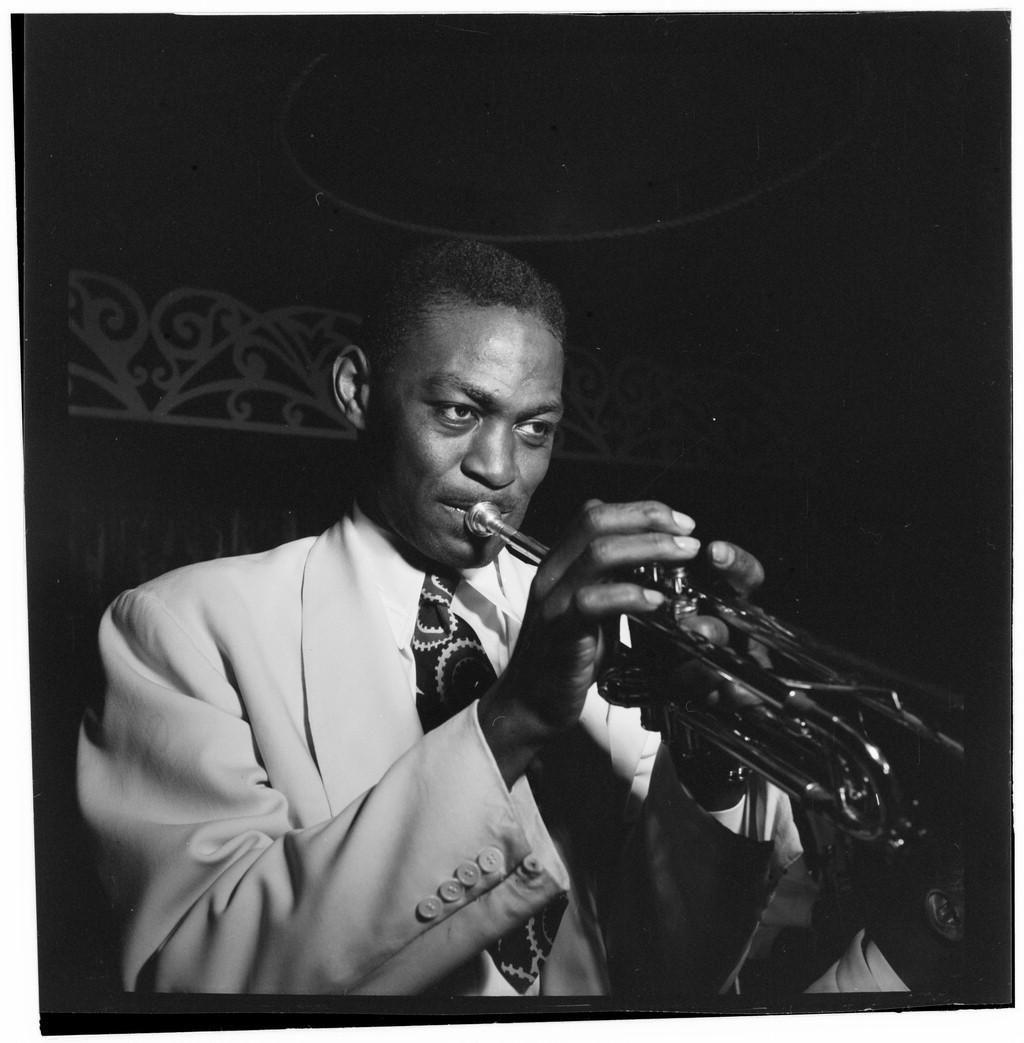
Taft Jordan, Aquarium, New York, ca. November 1946

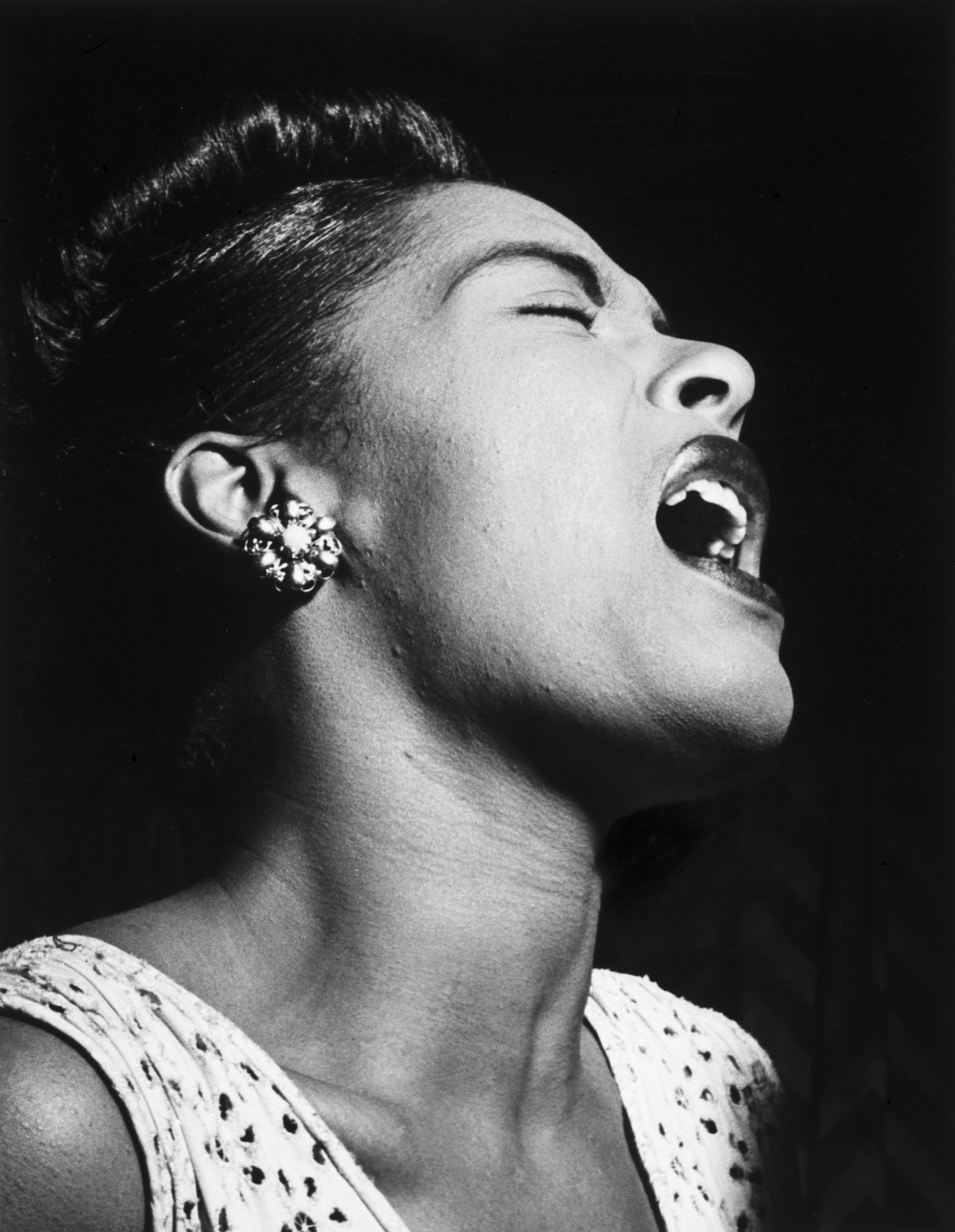
Billie Holiday. Photo by William Gottlieb, 1947.

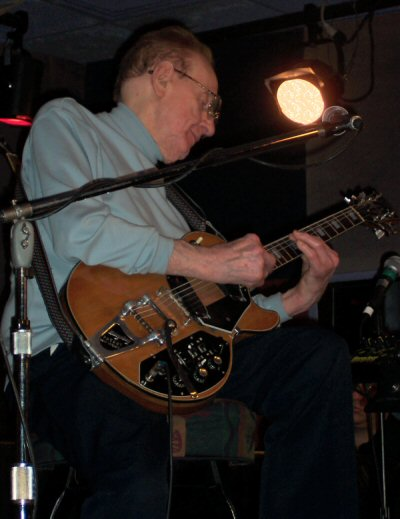
Les Paul 2004.

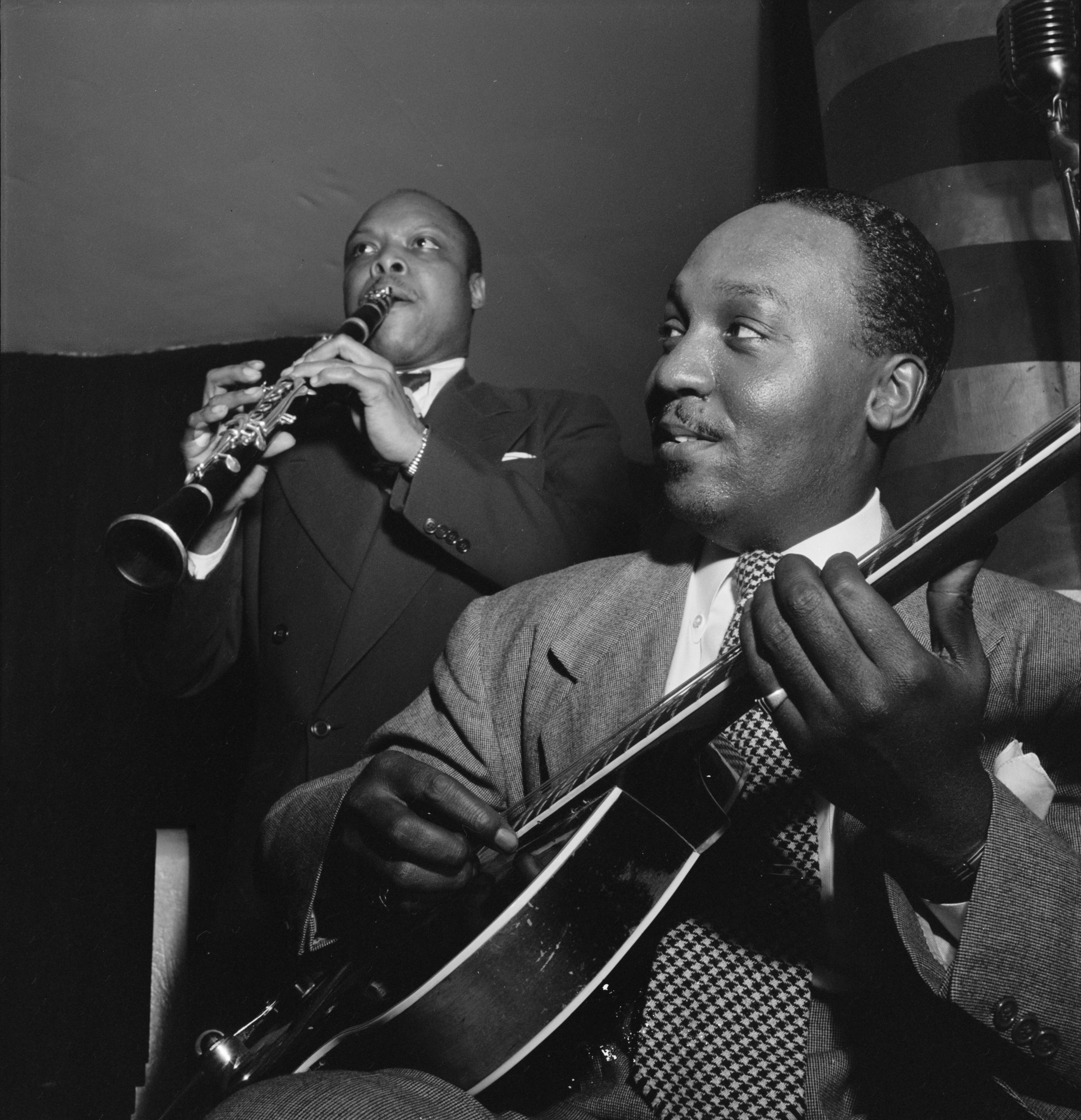
Al Casey and Eddie Barefield, Cafe Society, New York City, c. 1947. Photo by William P. Gottlieb

January

- 2 – Nick Fatool, American drummer (died 2000).
- 7
  - Chano Pozo, Afro-Cuban percussionist and singer (died 1948).
  - Keg Purnell, American swing jazz drummer (died 1965).
- 10 – Buddy Johnson, American pianist and bandleader (died 1977).
- 21 – Julian Gould, American organist, pianist and composer (died 1977).
- 23 – Scoops Carry, American alto saxophonist and clarinetist (died 1970).
- 29 – John Serry Sr., American accordionist virtuoso (died 2003).
- 31 – Bobby Hackett, American trumpeter and guitarist (died 1976).

February

- 3 – Bill Miller, American pianist (died 2006).
- 15 – Taft Jordan, American trumpeter (died 1981).
- 22 – Cee Pee Johnson, American drummer and vocalist (died 1947).
- 25 – Ray Perry, American violinist and saxophonist (died 1950).
- 28 – Lee Castle, American trumpeter and bandleader (died 1990).

March

- 18 – Al Hall, American upright bassist (died 1988).
- 21 – Hank D'Amico, American clarinetist (died 1965).
- 25 – Linton Garner, American pianist (died 2003).
- 26 – Flip Phillips, American tenor saxophonist and clarinetist (died 2001).
- 29 – George Chisholm, Scottish trombonist (died 1997).

April

- 7 – Billie Holiday, American singer (died 1959).
- 19 – Vi Burnside, American saxophonist and bandleader (died 1964).
- 29 – Donald Mills, American singer, The Mills Brothers (died 1999).

May

- 2 – Van Alexander, American bandleader, arranger, and composer (died 2015).
- 15 – Gus Viseur, Belgian-French button accordionist (died 1974).
- 16 – Marlowe Morris, American pianist and organist (died 1978).
- 26
  - Murray Kane, American Corporal, composer, and band manager (died 1986).
  - Vernon Alley, American bassist (died 2004).
- 27 – Midge Williams, African-American singer (died 1952).

June

- 9 – Les Paul, American guitarist, songwriter, and inventor (died 2009).
- 12 – Zeke Zarchy, American lead trumpeter (died 2009).
- 15 – Allan Reuss, American guitarist (died 1988).
- 27 – Harry Gibson, pianist, singer, proto-rapper, and songwriter (died 1991).
- 28 – Henry Adler, American drummer and percussionist (died 2008).

July

- 1 – Willie Dixon, American vocalist, songwriter, arranger, and record producer (died 1992).
- 5 – Al Timothy, Trinidadian jazz and calypso musician (died 2000).
- 10 – Milt Buckner, American pianist and organist (died 1977).
- 23 – Emmett Berry, American trumpeter (died 1993).
- 24 – Herbie Haymer, American reedist (died 1949).
- 31 – George Kelly, American tenor saxophonist and vocalist (died 1998).

August

- 4 – Irving Fields, American pianist and lounge music artist (died 2016).
- 12 – Doc West, American drummer (died 1951).
- 15 – Morey Feld, American drummer (died 1971).
- 16
  - Murray McEachern, Canadian trombonist and alto saxophonist (died 1982).
  - Al Hibbler, American baritone singer, Duke Ellington Orchestra (died 2001).
- 23 – Graciela, Afro-Cuban singer (died 2010).
- 24 – Wynonie Harris, American rhythm and blues singer (died 1969).

September

- 15 – Al Casey, American guitarist (died 2005).

October

- 4 – Chino Pozo, Cuban drummer (died 1980).
- 10 – Sweets Edison, American trumpeter (died 1999).
- 19 – Frances Klein, American trumpeter (died 2012).
- 31
  - Chris Griffin, American trumpeter (died 2005)
  - Jane Jarvis, American pianist and composer (died 2010).

November

- 14
  - Billy Bauer, American guitarist (died 2005).
  - Martha Tilton, American singer (died 2006).
- 17 – Shorty Sherock, American trumpeter (died 1980).
- 18 – Boots Mussulli, Italian-American jazz saxophonist (died 1967).
- 25 – Gus Bivona, American reedist (died 1996).
- 26 – Earl Wild, American pianist (died 2010).
- 28 – Dick Vance, American trumpeter and arranger (died 1985).
- 29 – Billy Strayhorn, American composer and pianist (died 1967).

December

- 4 – Eddie Heywood, American pianist (died 1989).
- 5 – Kansas Fields, American drummer (died 1995).
- 12 – Frank Sinatra, American singer and actor (died 1998).
- 16 – Turk Murphy, American trombonist (died 1987).
- 26 – Una Mae Carlisle, American singer, pianist, and songwriter (died 1956).
