= 1912 in jazz =

- Decade: 1910s in jazz
- Music: 1912 in music
- Standards: List of pre-1920 jazz standards
- See also: 1911 in jazz – 1913 in jazz

This is a timeline documenting events of jazz in the year 1912.

== Events ==
- W.C. Handy writes "The Memphis Blues". It becomes a great hit, making the start of published blues music.
- The singer Bessie Smith starts working as a vaudeville dancer.
- Louis Armstrong forms a vocal quartet together with some long time friends in New Orleans.

== Births ==
January

- 1 – Svein Øvergaard, Norwegian saxophonist and percussionist (died 1986).
- 7 – Bob Zurke, American pianist, arranger, and composer (died 1944).
- 12 – Trummy Young, African-American trombonist (died 1984).
- 22 – Harry Parry, Welsh clarinetist and bandleader (died 1956).

February

- 12 – Paul Bascomb, American tenor saxophonist (died 1986).

March

- 1 – Joseph Reinhardt, French guitarist and composer (died 1982).
- 2 – Red Saunders, American drummer and bandleader (died 1981).
- 12
  - Jiří Traxler, Czech-Canadian pianist, composer, lyricist, and arranger (died 2011).
  - Paul Weston, American pianist, arranger, composer, and conductor (died 1996).

April

- 2 – Herbert Mills, American singer, Mills Brothers (died 1989).
- 11 – John Levy, African-American upright bassist (died 2012).

May

- 9 – George T. Simon, American writer and drummer (died 2001).
- 13 – Gil Evans, Canadian pianist, arranger, composer, and bandleader (died 1988).
- 14 – Les Brown, American bandleader (died 2001).
- 28 – Dave Barbour, American guitarist (died 1965).

June

- 15 – Alix Combelle, French tenor saxophonist, clarinetist, and bandleader (died 1978).
- 26 – Clarence Profit, American pianist and composer (died 1944).

July

- 8 – Johnny Mince, American clarinetist (died 1997).
- 12 – Will Bradley, American trombonist and bandleader (died 1989).
- 27 – Asser Fagerström, Finnish pianist, composer, and actor (died 1990).

August

- 13 – Nate Kazebier, American trumpeter (died 1969).
- 26 – Léo Marjane, French singer (died 2016).

September

- 7 – Alvin Alcorn, American trumpeter (died 2003).
- 9 – Jean Omer, Belgian reedist and bandleader (died 1994).
- 27 – Erhard Bauschke, German reedist and bandleader (died 1945).
- 30 – Bill Johnson, American saxophonist, clarinetist, and arranger (died 1960).

October

- 5 – Ernst Höllerhagen, German reedist (died 1956).
- 7 – Beverly Peer, American upright bassist (died 1997).
- 13 – Nellie Lutcher, African-American singer and pianist (died 2007).
- 19 – Red Richards, American pianist (died 1998).
- 21 – Don Byas, American tenor saxophonist (died 1972).
- 27 – Gösta Törner, Swedish jazz trumpeter and bandleader (died 1982).

November

- 1 – Franz Jackson, American saxophonist and clarinetist (died 2008).
- 13 – Ted Donnelly, American trombonist (died 1958).
- 23
  - Svein Øvergaard, Norwegian saxophonist, percussionist, and bandleader (died 1986).
  - Anselmo Sacasas, Cuban pianist, bandleader, composer, and arranger (died 1998).
- 24 – Teddy Wilson, American pianist (died 1986).

December

- 5 – Marshall Royal, American clarinetist and alto saxophonist (died 1995).
- 6 – Paloma Efron, Argentine singer (died 1977).
- 10 – Irving Fazola, American clarinetist (died 1949).
- 24 – Anne Lenner, English singer (died 1997).
- 29 – Thore Ehrling, Swedish trumpeter, composer, and bandleader (died 1994).
