= Jurković =

- Language: Slavic

Origin
- Derivation: Serbo-Croatian juraj or the Slovenian jurij + vic
- Meaning: "Son of George"

Other names
- Alternative spelling: Jurkovič

Jurković or Jurkovič is a West Slavic and South Slavic surname. It is a patronymic of the Serbo-Croatian juraj or the Slovenian jurij, which are the Slavic equivalents of the English name George. Within Croatia, the surname is associated with Vrbovsko, although in recent years, more people with the surname have been born in Slovenia.

Notable people with the name include:

- Boris Jurkovic (born 1969), American stock car racing driver
- Damir Jurković (born 1970), Croatian footballer
- Darko Jurković (born 1965), Croatian jazz guitarist and composer
- Dušan Jurkovič (1868–1947), Slovak architect
- Igor Jurković (born 1985), Croatian kickboxer
- Ivica Jurković (born 1973), Slovenian basketball player
- Ivan Jurkovič (born 1952), Slovenian catholic prelate
- John Jurkovic (born 1967), American football player of Croatian descent
- Mirko Jurkovic (1970–2013), American football player of Croatian descent

== See also ==
- Yurkovich
