= Yurkovich =

Yurkovich is a Slavic surname. Notable people with the surname include:

- David Yurkovich (born 1964), American independent writer and illustrator of comic books and graphic novels
- Rachel Yurkovich (born 1986), American javelin thrower
- Stephen Yurkovich, American electrical engineer
- Tom Yurkovich (1935–2023), American former ice hockey goaltender and Olympian

== See also ==
- Jurković
