= Ole Jørn Myklebust =

Norwegian jazz musician (born 1977)

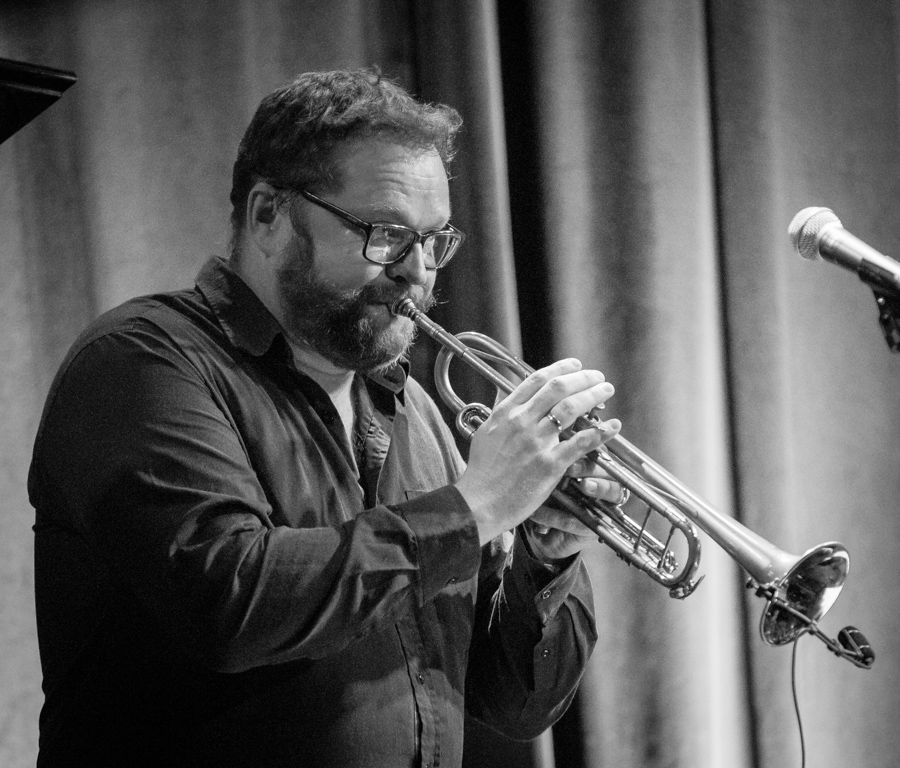
- Ole Jørn Myklebust performing in 2017

Background information
- Born: 30 April 1977 (age 49); Eidsdal, Møre og Romsdal, Norway
- Origin: Norway
- Genre: Jazz
- Occupations: Musician, music arranger, composer
- Instruments: Trumpet, flugelhorn, vocals
- Website: Official website

Ole Jørn Myklebust (born 30 April 1977) is a Norwegian jazz musician (trumpet, flugelhorn and vocals), educated at the Norges Musikkhøgskole. Known for performing in Subtonic, Køhn/Johansen Sextet, Geir Lysne Listening Ensemble, Østenfor Sol and Dixi, Myklebust has collaborated with Mari Boine and Unni Wilhelmsen. He was born in Eidsdal.

== Career ==
Myklebust was voted "The Best Young Jazz Musicians in Norway" in 2000. He has also played with the band Østenfor Sol, in addition to Mari Boine's and Unni Wilhelmsen's bands. Myklebust also works as composer, musical arranger and producer. He has composed music for TV, film, and documentaries. He came in as a substitute on the trumpet with Mike del Ferro Quintet, with among others Anne Paceo (drums), on their Norway tour in January 2012.

== Discography ==
From Groove.no & Discogs.com

=== As band leader ===
With "Østenfor Sol"

- 1998: Syng, Dovre (MajorStudio)
- 2001: Troillspel (MajorStudio)

With "Subtonic"

- 2004: In This House (Aim Records)
- 2006: Oslo Jazzfestival 20 År (Oslo Jazzfestival), various artists live – on the track "Subtonic»

=== As sideman ===
With Geir Lysne

- 2002: Aurora Borealis – Nordic Lights (ACT Records), Suite For Jazz Orchestra
- 2003: Korall (ACT Records), "Geir Lysne Listening Ensemble" feat. Sondre Bratland
- 2006: Boahjenásti – The North Star (ACT Records), "Geir Lysne Listening Ensemble"

With "Notodden Blues Band" & Torhild Sivertsen

- 2003: Soul (Bluestown Records)

With Køhn/Johansen

- 2003: Angels (Real Records), on the track "Mercurial Love»

With Bugge Wesseltoft

- 2004: New Conception of Jazz: Film Ing (Jazzland Records), on the tracks "Hi Is?" & "Oh Ye»

With Samsaya

- 2004: Shedding Skin (Port Azur/Tuba)

With Jaa9 & Onkl P

- 2004: Sjåre Brymæ (C+C Records, Sonet Music)

With Dum Dum Boys

- 2006: Gravitasjon (Oh Yeah!/EMI Virgin), on the track "Lunta Brenner»
- 2009: Tidsmaskin (Oh Yeah!/EMI Virgin)

With Unni Wilhelmsen

- 2006: Til Meg (St. Cecilia Music)

With Torun Eriksen

- 2006: Your Guide to the North Sea Jazz Festival 2006, various artists – on the track "This Is So Real"

With "El Axel"

- 2007: It Is Wha It Is (Pass It Records), on the track "Showtime (Move Your Arms)»

With Paal Flaata

- 2008: Old Angel Midnight (Pass It Records), on the track "Ten Pretty Houses in a Row»

With Brynjar Rasmussen

- 2011: Arctic Mood (Nordnorsk Jazzsenter, Finito Bacalao Records)

=== As arranger for Jim Stärk ===
- 2002: Ten Songs and Hey Hey – (BP/Sonet)
