= 1982 in jazz =

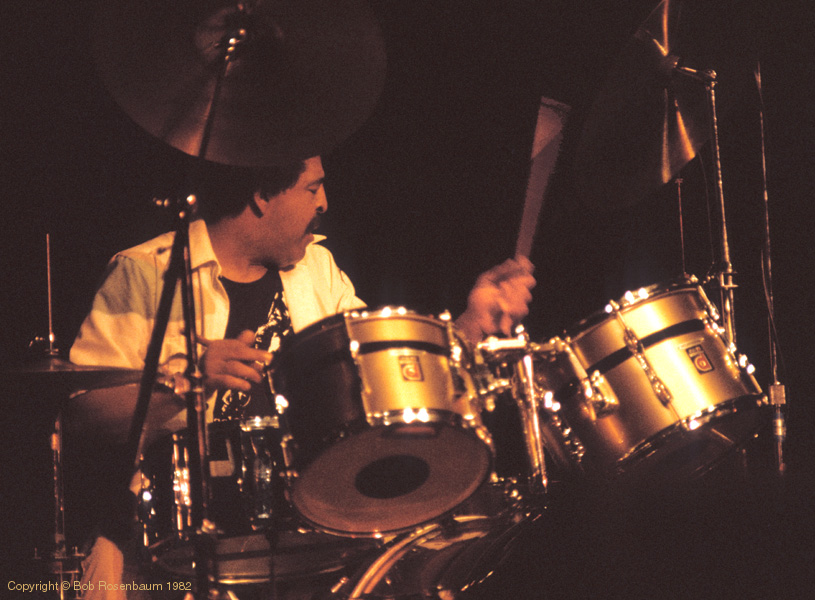
- Drummer J.R. Mitchell in an appearance with his quintet at the 1982 Kool Jazz Festival in New York
- Decade: 1980s in jazz
- Music: 1982 in music
- Standards: List of post-1950 jazz standards
- See also: 1981 in jazz – 1983 in jazz

This is a timeline documenting events of jazz in the year 1982.

== Events ==
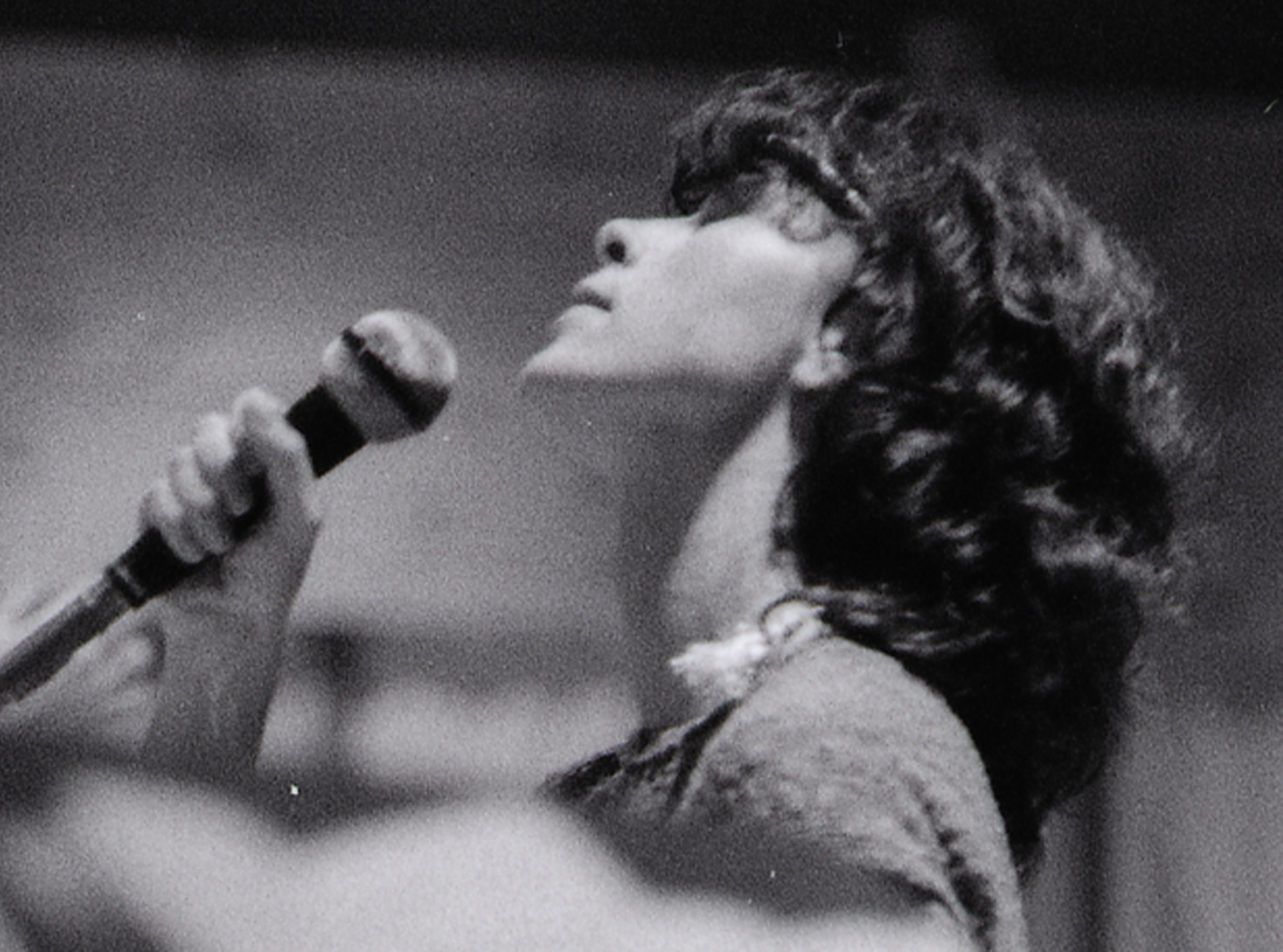
Radka Toneff in Bergen, Norway 1982.

=== April ===
- 2 – The 9th Vossajazz started in Vossavangen, Norway (April 2 – 4).

=== May ===
- 26 – 10th Nattjazz started in Bergen, Norway (May 26 – June 9).
- 28 – 11th Moers Festival started in Moers, Germany (May 28 – 31).

=== June ===
- 2 – The 3rd Montreal International Jazz Festival started in Montreal, Quebec, Canada (July 2 – 11).

=== July ===
- 9 – The 16th Montreux Jazz Festival started in Montreux, Switzerland (July 9 – 31).
- 16 – The 7th North Sea Jazz Festival started in The Hague, Netherlands (July 16 – 18).

=== September ===
- 17 – The 25th Monterey Jazz Festival started in Monterey, California (September 17 – 19).

== Album releases ==
- Anthony Davis: Variations In Dream-time
- Henry Threadgill: When Was That?
- Air: 80° Below '82
- Billy Bang: Outline No. 12
- Dave Holland: Life Cycle
- David Murray: Murray's Steps
- Jane Ira Bloom: Mighty Lights
- Lol Coxhill: Instant Replay
- Dewey Redman: The Struggle Continues
- Steve Lacy: Flame
- Elements: Elements
- Errol Parker: Tentet
- James Ulmer: Black Rock
- Joe McPhee: Oleo
- John Carter: Dauwhe
- Sonny Simmons: Backwoods Suite
- Steps Ahead: Paradox
- Tony Coe: Tournee Du Chat
- Ronald Shannon Jackson: Mandance
- Warren Vaché: Midtown Jazz
- Paul Winter: Missa Gaia/Earth Mass
- Cecil McBee: Flying Out
- Jack DeJohnette: Inflation Blues
- Stanley Jordan: Touch Sensitive
- Kevin Eubanks: Guitarist
- Michael Franks: Objects of Desire
- Hugh Masekela: Home
- Claus Ogerman and Michael Brecker: Cityscape

== Deaths ==
January

- 9 – Vido Musso, Italian-American tenor saxophonist, clarinetist, and bandleader (born 1913).

February

- 7 – Joseph Reinhardt, French guitarist and composer (born 1912).
- 17 – Thelonious Monk, American pianist and composer (born 1917).
- 26 – Gábor Szabó, Hungarian guitarist (born 1936).

March

- 9 – Leonid Utyosov, Soviet singer and comic actor (born 1895).
- 23 – Sonny Greer, American drummer and vocalist (born 1895).

May

- 5 – Cal Tjader, American vibraphonist, drummer, and percussionist (born 1925).

June

- 11 – Al Rinker, American singer and composer (born 1907).
- 15 – Art Pepper, American alto saxophonist and clarinetist (born 1925).
- 25 – Alex Welsh, Scottish singer, cornetist, and trumpeter (born 1929).

July

- 9 – Wingy Manone, American trumpeter, composer, singer, and bandleader (born 1900).
- 22 – Sonny Stitt, American saxophonist (born 1924).

October

- 21 – Radka Toneff, Norwegian singer (born 1952).

November

- 11 – Gösta Törner, Swedish jazz trumpeter and bandleader (born 1912).
- 16 – Al Haig, American pianist (born 1922).

December

- 17 – Big Joe Williams, American guitarist, singer, and songwriter (born 1903).

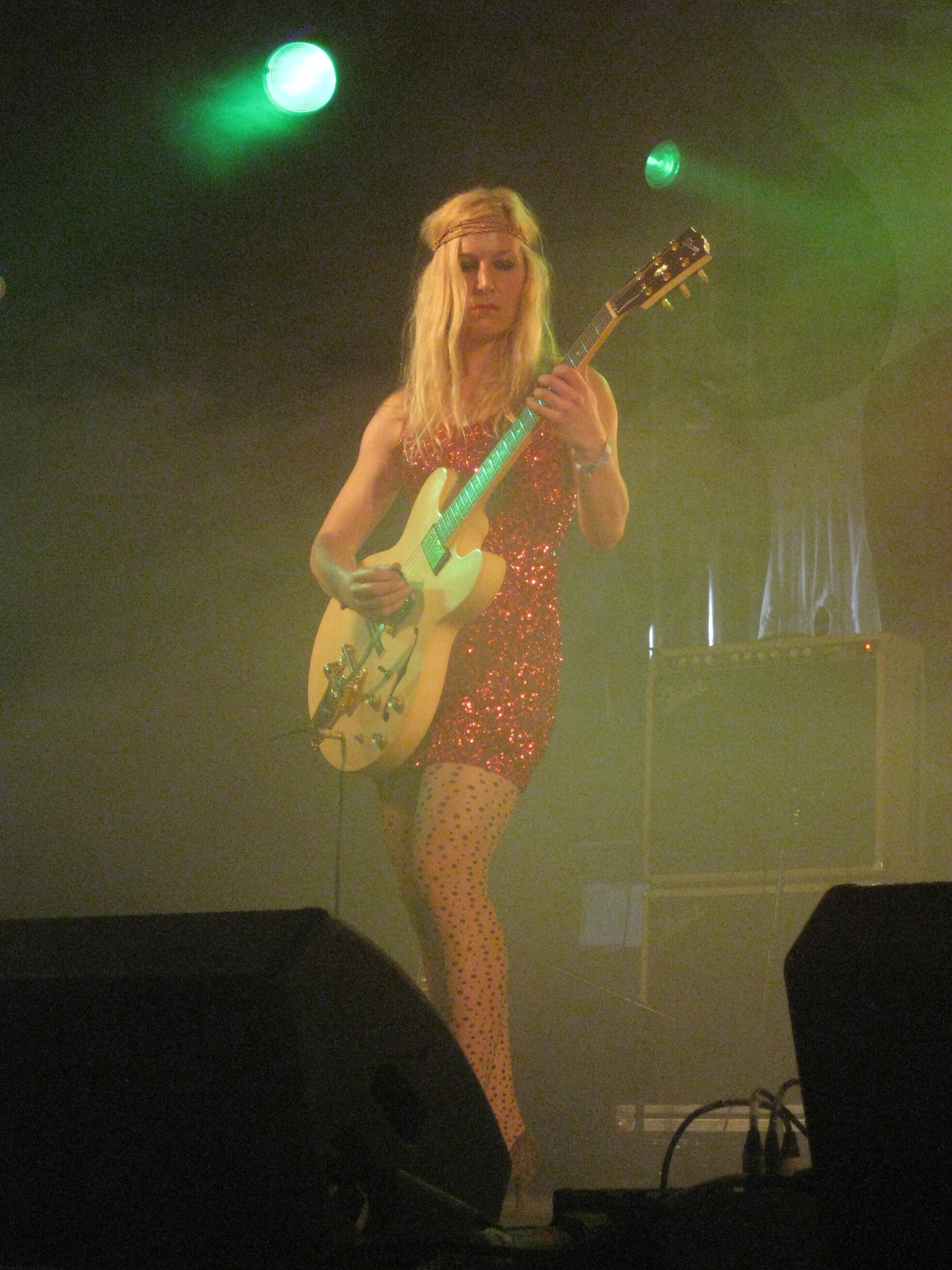
Hedvig Mollestad Thomassen in 2012.

== Births ==
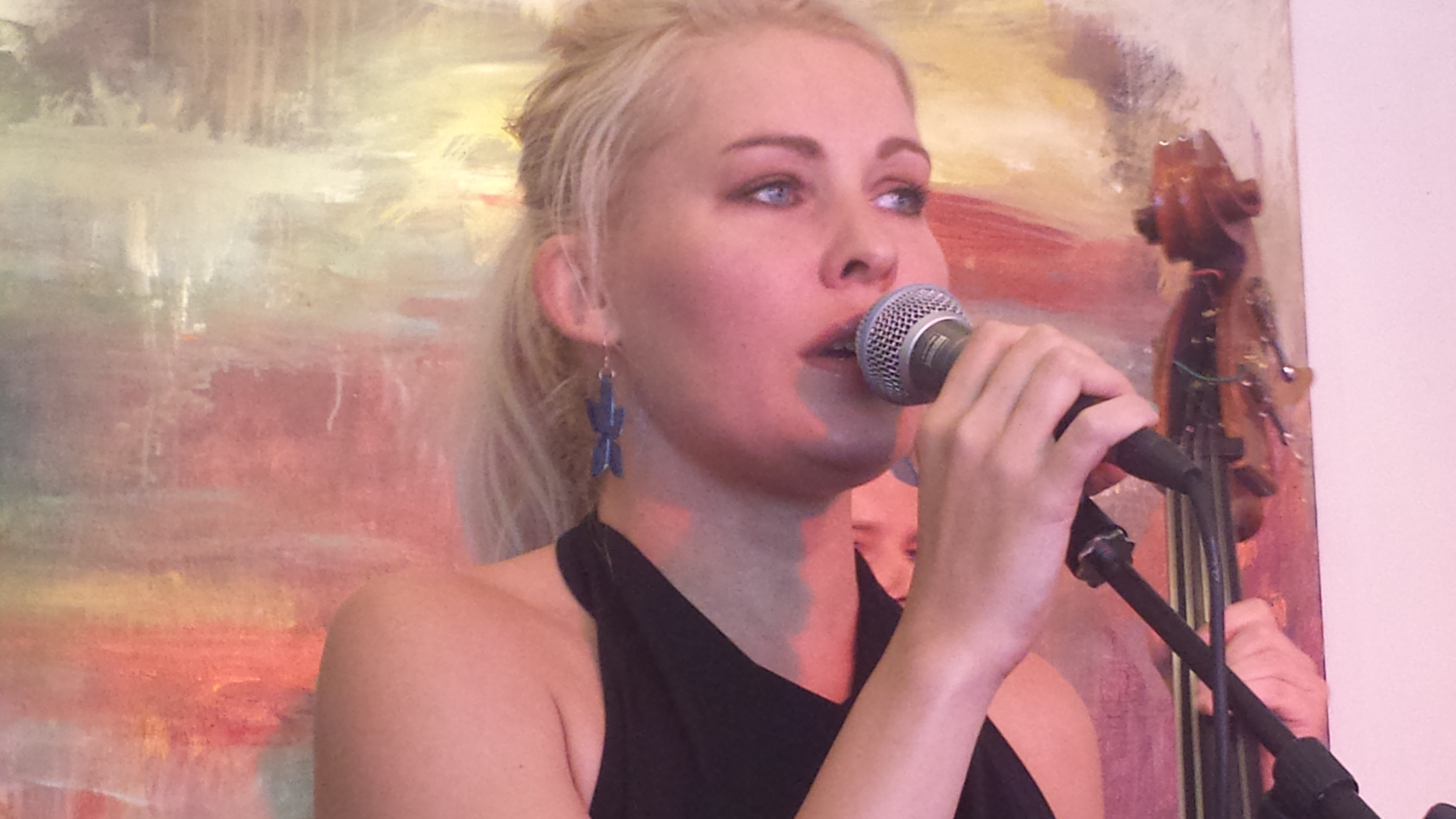
Malene Mortensen at the 2016 Copenhagen Jazz Festival.

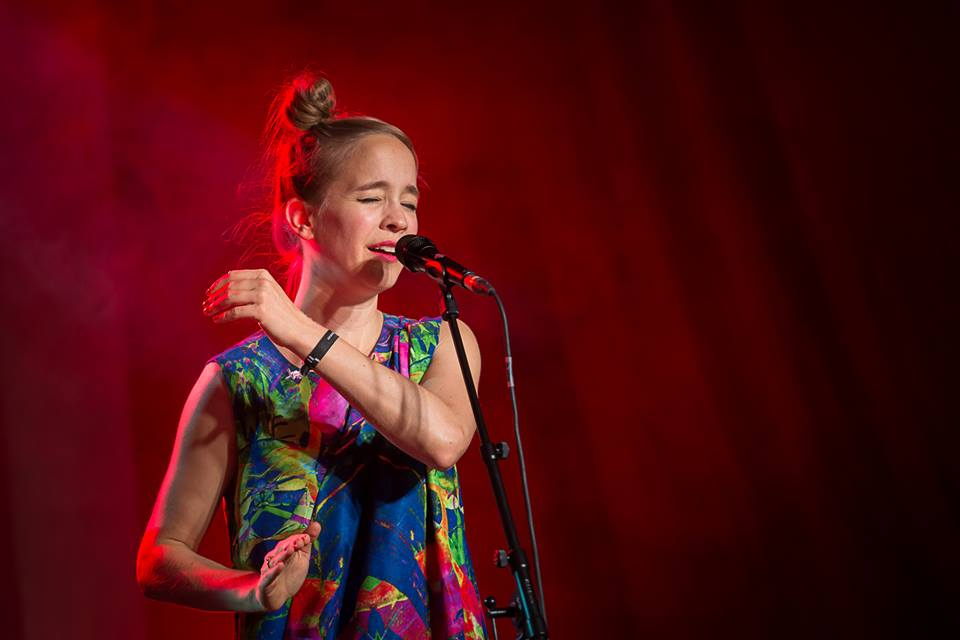
Veronika Harcsa 2016.

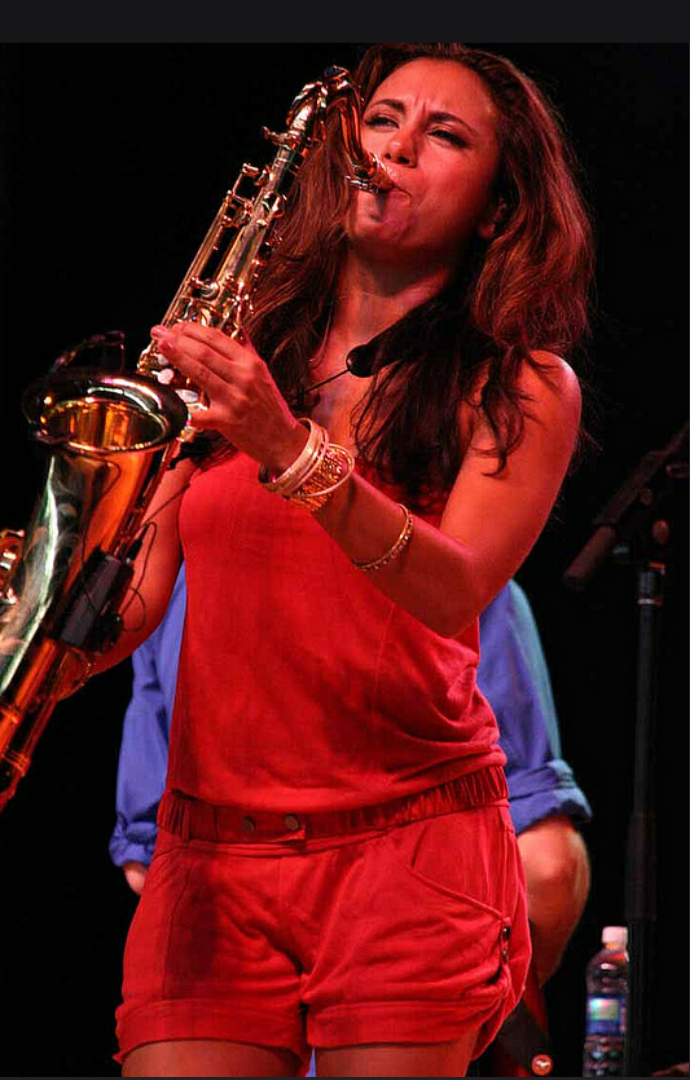
Jessy J 2009.

January

- 1 – Andreas Lønmo Knudsrød, Norwegian drummer, Splashgirl.

February

- 4 – Hedvig Mollestad Thomassen, Norwegian guitarist, singer, and composer.
- 5 – Marco Di Meco, Italian flautist, composer, music producer, and writer.
- 13 – Even Helte Hermansen, Norwegian guitarist, Bushman's Revenge and Red Kite.

March

- 8 – Isak Strand, Norwegian drummer, electronica artist, and sound engineer, Me At Sea.
- 9 – Erica von Kleist, American flautist, saxophonist, and composer.

April

- 2 – Daniel Herskedal, Norwegian tubist.
- 3 – Irene Kepl, Austrian violinist and composer.
- 9 – Øyvind Skarbø, Norwegian drummer and composer.
- 13 – Nellie McKay, British comedian, singer, songwriter, actor, and composer.
- 30 – Tyler Gilmore, American composer and orchestra conductor.

May

- 1 – Ambrose Akinmusire, American trumpeter and composer.
- 23
  - Malene Mortensen, Danish singer.
  - Martin Musaubach, Argentine band-leading pianist, composer, arranger and producer.

July

- 7 – Ferit Odman, Turkish drummer and composer.
- 28 – Mariam Wallentin, Swedish singer, musician, composer, and voice actor.

August

September

- 11 – Michel Reis, Luxembourgian jazz pianist and composer.

October

- 4 – Kassa Overall, American drummer, producer, rapper and bandleader.
- 4 – YolanDa Brown, British saxophonist and composer.
- 5 – Ronald Bruner Jr., American drummer, composer and producer.
- 8 – Veronika Harcsa, Hungarian singer and songwriter.
- 11 – Jonathan Fritzén, Swedish pianist and multi-instrumentalist.
- 12 – Émile Parisien, French soprano saxophonist, alto saxophonist, and composer.

November

- 9 – Jamie Lenman, British guitarist, musician, songwriter, singer, and illustrator.

December

- 3 – Eric Darius, American saxophonist, vocalist, songwriter, and producer.
- 4 – Adam Blackstone, American multi-instrumentalist, songwriter, producer, and bassist.
- 6 – Ulysses Owens, American drummer and percussionist.
- 17 – Stephan Meidell, Norwegian guitarist and composer.
- 20 – Jessy J or Jessica Arellano, American saxophonist, flautist, singer, and pianist.
- 30 – Nir Felder, American jazz and session guitarist, composer, and music producer.

Unknown date

- Daniel Zamir, Israeli saxophonist and singer.

== See also ==
- 1980s in jazz
- List of years in jazz
- 1982 in music
