= Joe Dixon (musician) =

American jazz reed player (1917–1998)

- Born: Giuseppe Ischia; April 21, 1917; Lynn, Massachusetts, U.S.
- Died: May 28, 1998 (aged 81) Oceanside, New York, U.S.
- Genres: Jazz
- Instruments: Clarinet

Joe Dixon (born Giuseppe Ischia; April 21, 1917 – May 28, 1998) was an American jazz reed player.

== Early life and education ==
Dixon was born in Lynn, Massachusetts. He began learning clarinet at age seven, later adding saxophone and flute to play in dance bands. He studied at the New England Conservatory of Music in 1934 and 1935.

== Career ==
After moving to New York City in 1935, he played with the Victor Young and Bill Staffon orchestras, then joined Tommy Dorsey in 1936–1937. He played briefly with Gus Arnheim in 1937, then with Bunny Berigan (1937–1938) and Fred Waring (1939–1943). He served in the United States Navy in 1944, leading a radio orchestra during this time, then worked later in the 1940s with Eddie Condon (1945–46), Bobby Hackett (1945), Phil Napoleon (1946), and Miff Mole (1947). In 1948 and 1949, he worked in orchestras for NBC and CBS, then did freelance work through the 1950s. From 1960 to 1963, he led the Long Island Jazz Quartette, but was hurt in a car crash in the 1960s which sidelined his career for several years. In the interim he worked as a disc jockey. He led the Nassau County Jazz Festival Orchestra in the 1970s, as well as the Nassau Neophonic Jazz Ensemble (1973–1981). He also founded a Swing Legacy Band in 1980, which was active for most of the 1980s.

== Death ==
Dixon died in Oceanside, New York, in 1998.
