= Arturo Tappin =

Barbadan saxophonist

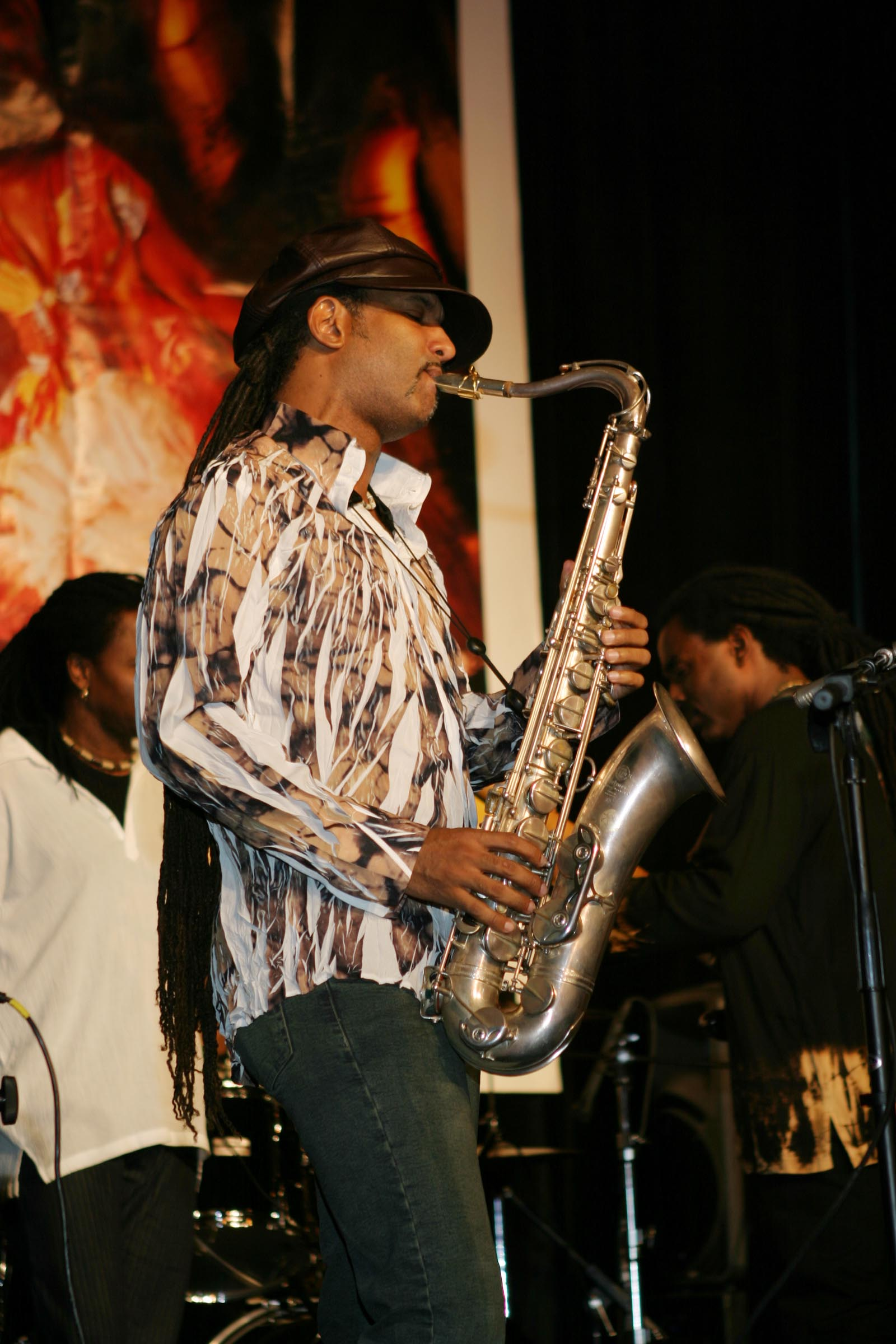
- Arturo Tappin at Barbados Week in Atlanta in 2003.

Background information
- Origin: Barbados
- Genres: Jazz, soul
- Instruments: Saxophone, flute
- Website: www.arturotappin.com

Arturo Tappin is a jazz/reggae saxophonist from Barbados. He performs predominantly the genre of smooth jazz, and has performed alongside personalities such as Roberta Flack, Monty Alexander, and on an album by Luther Vandross.

He is based in New York City, but is strongly linked to his homeland. In the late 1980s he made his debut as a leader of his own quintet including pianist Jacky Terrasson at International Barbados/Caribbean Jazz Festival.

== Background ==
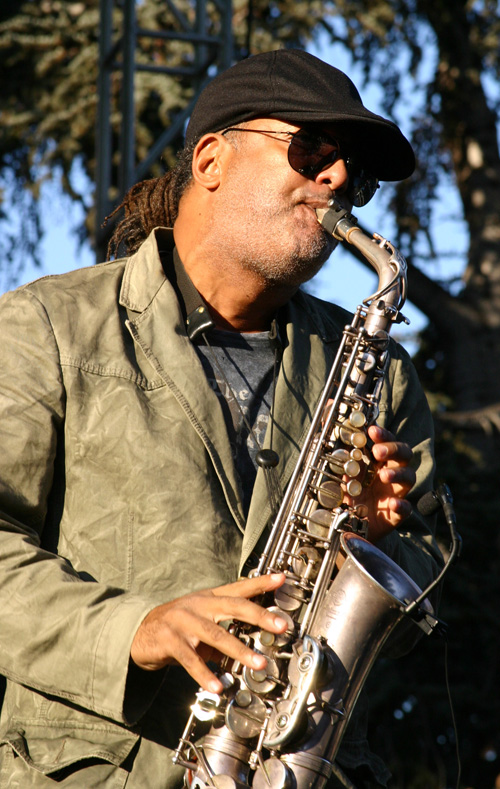
Arturo Tappin performing at the Experience On The Green Event in Oakland, California at the Oakland Museum of California in 2008.(Photo/Adam Turner)

Arturo Tappin began his musical career, with formal training at Berklee College of Music. Described as a cross between the Teddy Pendergrass and Kenny G, Tappin has been referred to as: "the smoothest, saxiest [sic] horn man the Caribbean has to offer." Influenced by the roots culture, he made headway with his roots-reggae Jazz-fusion album for his debut recording, and increased the hype with a repeat performance on his second album, entitled Java, both licensed by Pioneer Records in Japan.

His dynamic live performances and his reputation for putting on explosive shows led him to perform at the Edinburgh Festival, Soho Jazz Festival, Miami AT&T Caribbean Jazz Festival, St. Lucia, Antigua, Curaçao, Montserrat,SKNVibes | Montserrat Jazzes Up Annual Calabash Festival St. Kitts, St. Vincent, Grenada and Barbados Jazz festivals, Arturo continued his live performance schedule at Bob Marley's Birthday Bash, James Bond Film Festival in Jamaica, and Trinidad's Independence Day celebration in Miami. Besides touring jazz festivals the world over, Tappin has performed at social engagements as well including a performance for past United States president Bill Clinton and twice for Fidel Castro and President Barack Obama. He received the 2005 Excellence in the Arts award from former Jamaican prime minister P. J. Patterson.

Tappin has played and recorded with many artists including Luther Vandross, Eddy Grant, Red Rodney, Milt Hilton, Monty Alexander, Ernest Ranglin, Jacky Terrasson, Courtney Pine, Al Harewood, Roy Haynes, Ellis Marsalis, Oliver Jones, Doc Cheatham, Pete King, Mutabaruka, The Wailers Band, Earl Brooks Jr., Frederick "Toots" Hibbert, Third World, Mikey Bennet, Dennis Bovell, Sandra Cross, Luther François, Maxi Priest, Bongo Herman and Dean Fraser. Tappin attributes much of his success to a former tutor at Berklee College of Music, Bill Pierce (Art Blakey and the Jazz Messengers), uncle Elombe Mottley, and his parents for their constant love and support. He can be currently seen on stage with singer and pianist Roberta Flack.

Artistes who have credited Tappin as a source of inspiration include: Elan Trotman and Shabaka Hutchings.

He is also a first cousin of The Hon. Mia Mottley, first female prime minister of Barbados.

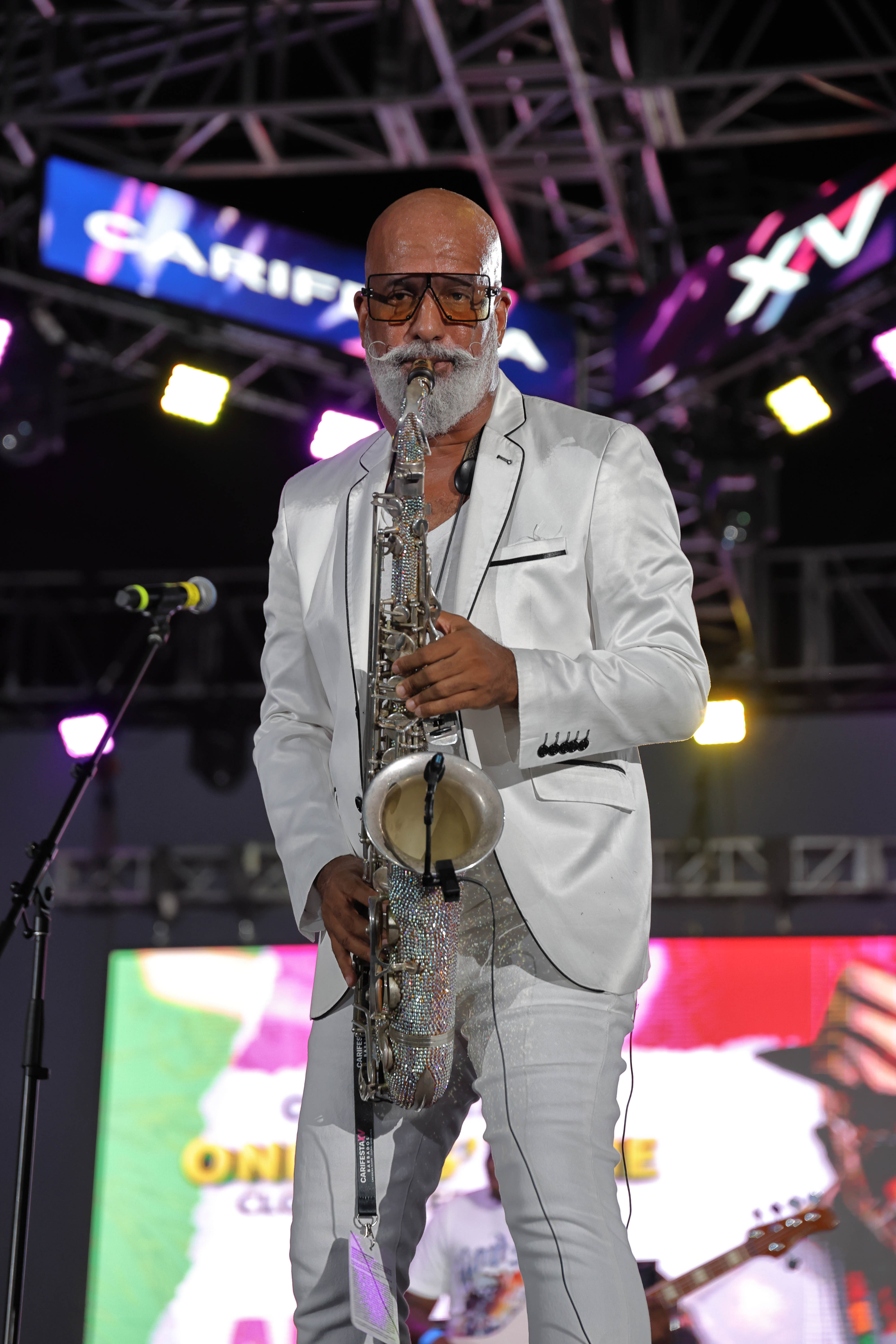
Arturo Tappin performing at Carifesta XV in Barbados 2025

== Awards ==
In 2003, Tappin won the SUNSHINE Award for Contribution to Caribbean Art Comedy Dance Drama Music and Poetry In 2021 the blog CONAN Daily ranked Tappin as #7 on its list of Barbados' "10 most handsome men alive".
