= Mirko Fait =

Italian jazz saxophonist and composer

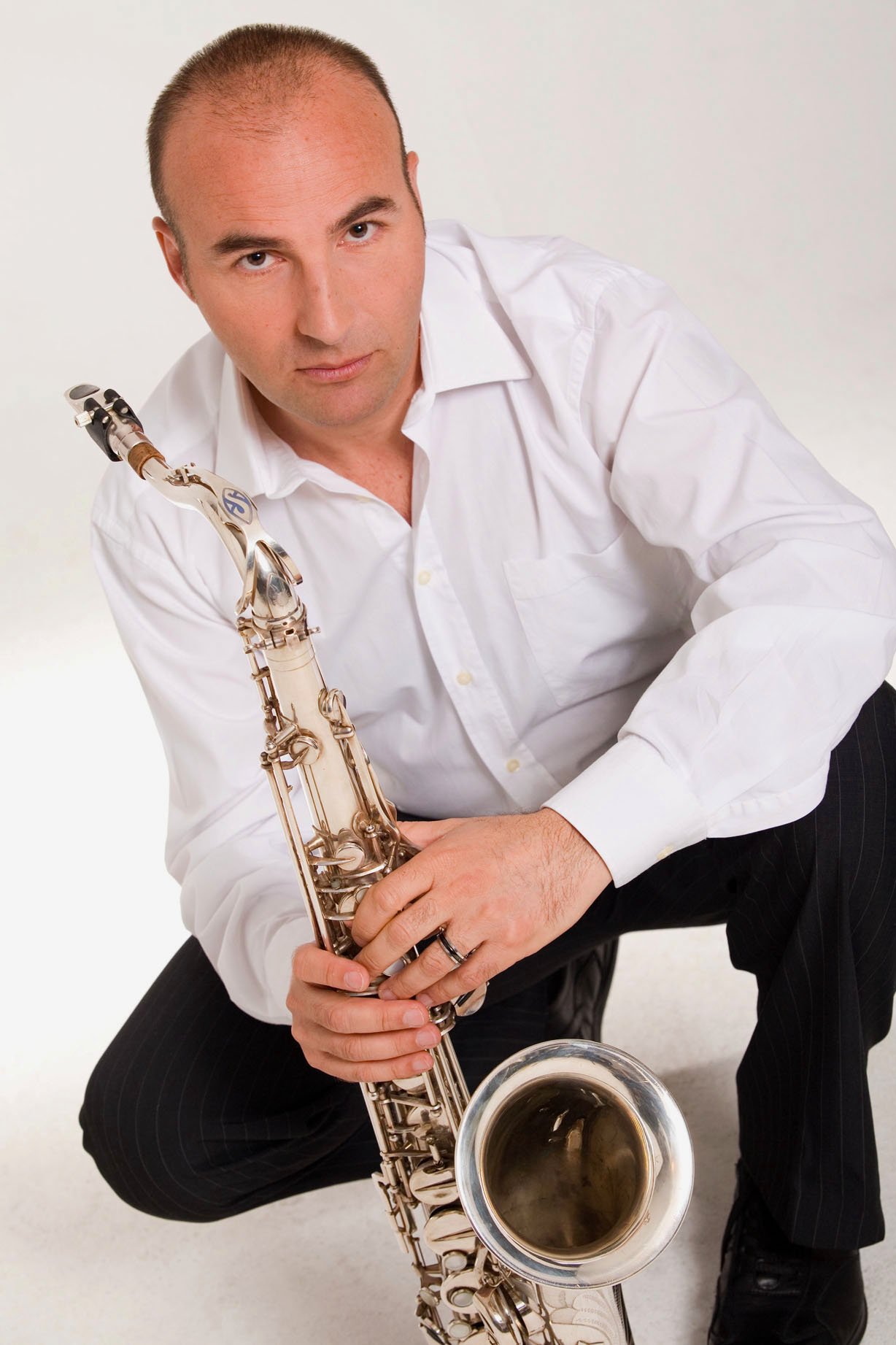

Background information
- Born: 3 June 1965; Milan, Italy
- Genres: Jazz, smooth jazz, ambient
- Occupation: Musician
- Instrument: Saxophone
- Years active: 1995–2010

Mirko Fait (born 3 June 1965) is an Italian jazz saxophonist and composer.

== Career ==
Born into a family of musicians, Fait began playing saxophone in his teenage years, gaining notoriety in 2002 when he accompanied Cuban musician Gendrickson Mena Diaz on a four-day fashion event hosted by Pitti Uomo. He has collaborated with Flavio Boltro, Elisabetta Guido, Marco Panascia, Joel Holmes, Phil Maturano, Antonio Zambrini, Attilio Zanchi, Tony Arco, Roberto Piermartire, Luigi Tognoli, and performed with others in clubs throughout Lombardy and Italy. In 2007, he founded the Fait Club Quintet. He also contributed to Mantic Ensemble, an album with Danilo Manto on pianoforte, Max Patrick on percussion, and Fait on soprano saxophone.

A plentiful artistic production with another 3 CDs, including one with the Atlantis Music Project, started thanks to the encounter with the record producers John Toso and Roxana Pranno.

In November 2009, he was chosen as the artistic director for United Jazz Artists of Milan. He is also the artistic director of the jazz section of Italian Way Music.

Mirko Fait played the part of a saxophonist in the movie Cado dalle nubi by comedian Checco Zalone from Zelig.

In July 2010, the song "Sex for Money" from the album Just for You with John Toso was chosen by the French label Believe for the summer jazz compilation 70 relaxing holiday masterpieces. The compilation included Miles Davis, Louis Armstrong, Billie Holiday, Chet Baker, Toquinho, Stefano Bollani, Enrico Rava, and Franco Cerri.

Some of Fait's pieces were chosen for a short film by director Alessandro Daquino.

From 2013 to 2018, he was the artistic director of the Cantina Scoffone, one of the most renowned places for jazz musicians and lovers in Milan. He then moved on to manage the musical programming in many locations like Il Tastevin, L'Arabesque, Le Rane Rosse, Motta Milano 1928 and Gud to name a few.

From 2016 to 2018, he presented his own radio and TV jazz programme: Jazz Wave.

In 2016 his album "Confidences", produced by Sant'Elpidio Jazz Festival and the association Jazz di Marca, came out and was presented at the Sant'Elpidio Jazz Festival in August 2016.

In May 2019, he played for the annual meeting of the Wunder Kammer Orchestra with the great trumpeter Flavio Boltro, the singer from Salento Elisabetta Guido and the pianist Yazan Grezelin. Mirko Fait also played in numerous clubs, prestigious hotels and festivals like Blue Note Milano, Memo Restaurant, Caffè Doria, Hilton Como, The View Lugano, Four Seasons Milan, Westin Palace Milan, JazzMi Festival, Ah-Um Jazz Festival, Doctor Jazz Salento Festival, Zagreb Jazz Festival...

== Discography ==
- Confidences (Italian Way Music, 2016)
- Soundtrack Emotions (Italian Way Music, 2011)
- United Jazz Artists of Milan (Italian Way Music, 2009)
- Open (Italian Way Music, 2009)
- Just for You (Italian Way Music, 2009)
- In a Whisper (Italian Way Music, 2008)
- Deep Lights (Italian Way Music, 2007)
