= Dine Doneff =

Macedonian composer and musician

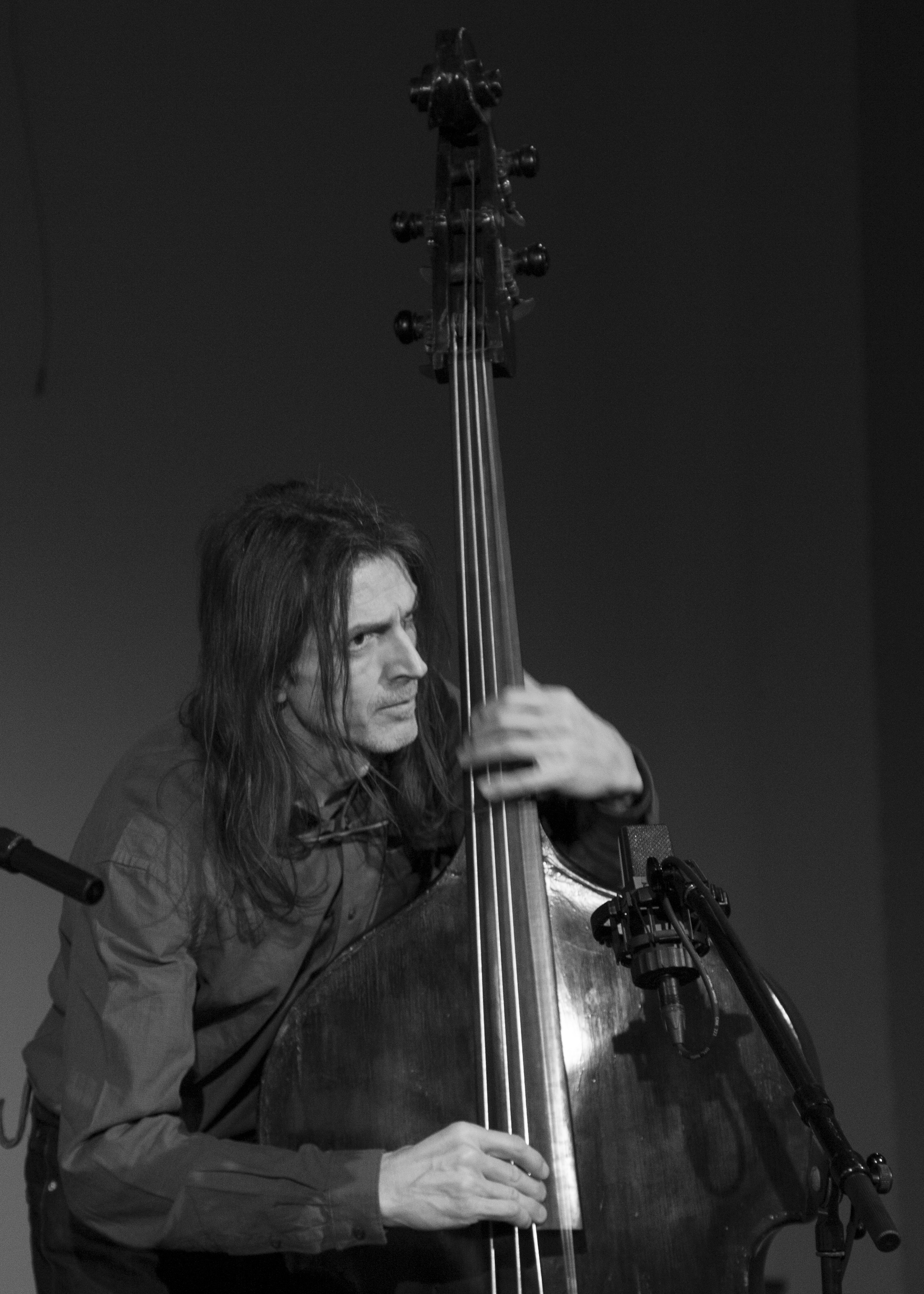
Solo Performance in Eröffnungsfestival 100 Jahre Bauhaus, Berlin January 18, 2019 (c)Fotini Potamia

Dine Doneff (born June 8, 1965), also known as Kostas Theodorou, is a Macedonian composer and multi-instrumentalist.

== Biography ==
Born in West Germany to Macedonian parents and raised in the northern Greek prefecture of Edessa, Dine Doneff (or Kostas Theodorou, according to his Greek citizenship name) has been active as a musician and composer since the mid-eighties. Faced with the choice between school and music, he left his home village and fled to Thessaloniki. He became a self taught musician.

By the 90s he was working as an arranger, ensemble director and producer on studio recordings. Alternating between touring abroad, he joined the group Savina Yannatou & Primavera en Salonico in 2001, with four albums released by ECM; from 2002 to 2005 he taught at the Technical Education Institute of Epirus and the University of Macedonia. Later, under the fictional auspices of ‘no bizz productions’, he became the pivot, and inspiration, of “ninety nine (99)”, improvised public rehearsal performances in a small underground theatre in Thessaloniki from 2005 to 2011 involving onstage encounters between Doneff and musicians, dancers, actors, poets and visual artists. Interludes of composing for the theatre and silver screen were interspersed with forays into theatre direction and, under the name of Tome Rapovina, directing and editing short films. From 2014 to 2016, he worked as a composer and actor with the Kammerpiele in Munich and the Thalia Theater in Hamburg.

As a result of his appearance as an ECM artist, Dine Doneff together with painter & photographer Fotini Potamia, founded the label “neRED music” following a suggestion of Manfred Eicher, ECM’s founder and producer. The label’s first releases “Rousilvo” 2018 and "IN/OUT" 2019, are marketed in cooperation with ECM Records.

Collaborations with (among others): Danny Hayes, Frank Köllges, Michalis Siganidis, Ara Dinkjan, Arto Tunçboyaciyan, Petro Lukas Chalkias, Luis Sclavis, Michel Godard, Sainkho Namtchylak, Theodosii Spassov, Takis Farazis, Argiris Bakirtzis, Ziad Rajab, Floros Floridis, Haig Yazdjian, Yannis Thomas, Christian Reiner, Anja Lechner, Natalia Mann, Luc Perceval.

== Discography (in selection) ==
- 1999: Nostos - Lyra
- 2003: Echotopia - FM Records
- 2005: Sumiglia - ECM
- 2008: Songs Of An Other - ECM
- 2015: Songs of Thessaloniki - ECM
- 2018: Rousilvo - neRED/ECM
- 2019: IN/OUT - neRED/ECM
- 2021: Lost Anthropology - neRED
- 2024: Suite Yedi - neRED
- 2025: Watersong - ECM
- 2025: Doudoule - neRED
- 2026: Roden Voden - neRED
