= Pud Brown =

American musician (1917-1996)

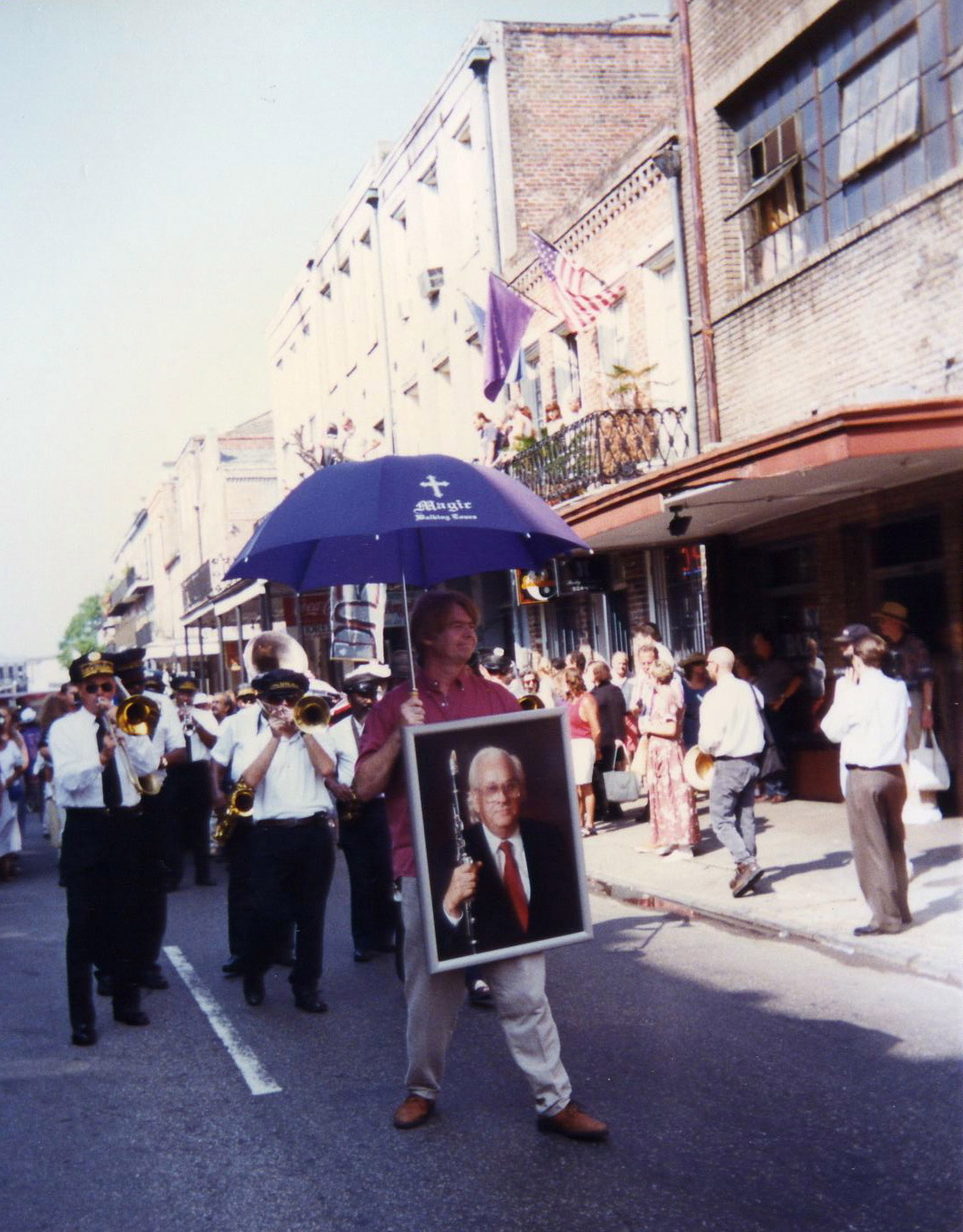
Pud Brown funeral photo

Albert Francis "Pud" Brown (January 22, 1917, Wilmington, Delaware - May 27, 1996, Algiers, Louisiana) was an American jazz reed player.

Though he was born in Delaware, Brown's parents raised him in Shreveport, Louisiana. Brown was fluent on saxophone by age five, and toured throughout North America in a family band at the age of seven. Brown's father, an engineer, built their motor home, a vehicle with a top speed of 25 miles per hour, which they took on tours of circuses, nightclubs, and minstrel shows in the middle of the 1920s.

After moving to Chicago, Brown found work in Phil Lavant's orchestra in 1938 and then in Lawrence Welk's band. In 1941 he married his wife Louise. He returned to Shreveport to run a motorcycle shop, but the endeavor failed, and he relocated once again to Los Angeles. There, he found prolific work as a jazz musician for the next several decades, playing with Les Brown, Coleman Hawkins, Doc Cheatham, Danny Barker, Kid Ory, Percy Humphrey and Louis Armstrong among others. He returned to New Orleans in 1975 and became a mainstay of the local scene there as well. He was a member of Clive Wilson's Original Camelia Brass Band in the 1980s, and a regular at the French Quarter's Palm Court Jazz Cafe until his death.

In addition to performing, Brown was also active as an educator in local schools.
