= Ted Donnelly =

American jazz musician

Ted "Muttonleg" Donnelly (November 13, 1912 – May 8, 1958) was an American jazz trombonist.

Donnelly began playing violin at age eight and picked up trombone at age twelve. He played first in the orchestra of George E. Lee, and in 1934 played with Tommy Douglas. From 1936 to 1943 Donnelly was in Andy Kirk's retinue, and following this he worked with Count Basie from 1943 to 1950. He also did a USO tour with Al Sears during World War II and worked briefly with Illinois Jacquet. From 1951 to 1957 he played with Erskine Hawkins, and died the following year.
