= Linton Garner =

American jazz pianist

- Born: Linton Garner; 25 March 1915; Greensboro, North Carolina
- Died: 6 March 2003 (aged 87) Vancouver, Canada
- Genre: Jazz
- Occupation: Musician
- Instruments: Piano, trumpet
- Years active: 1930s–2003

Linton Garner (March 25, 1915 in Greensboro, North Carolina – March 6, 2003 in Vancouver) was an American jazz pianist. He was the older brother of Erroll Garner.

== Biography ==
As a youngster he was keener to play cornet than piano, but due to problems with his teeth, was forced to concentrate on the keyboard. From the age of 8 until 10 he had piano lessons, as did his three sisters (Martha, Ruth and Berniece), unlike his brother Erroll.

He was arranger and pianist with Fletcher Henderson's band before the Second World War, then spent 1943 to 1946 in the army, where he played both piano and trumpet in different bands. Afterwards he was pianist and arranger for a number of distinguished bands including those of Billy Eckstine and Dizzy Gillespie. He also accompanied Sarah Vaughan, Nat King Cole, Carmen McRae and Della Reese. He also wrote songs, including "You're the One For Me."

He moved to Canada in 1963. In 1974, Arni May invited him to Vancouver to accompany him at the opening of the Richmond Inn Hotel. Linton stayed in Vancouver and worked in many venues. He was resident pianist for seven years at the Four Seasons Hotel. At the time, Garner wrote the piano theme for the 1977 Canadian drama movie Skip Tracer. In the 1990s he played at the Three Greenhorns in Vancouver. He also sang and played the piano in Rossini's restaurant in Kitsilano.

The Linton Garner Legacy Quartet, featuring drummer Don Fraser, bassist Russ Botten pianist Ron Johnston, pianist Miles Black continues to play Garner's music.

He died of kidney failure in Vancouver at the age of 87.
