= Farnell Newton =

American composer and jazz trumpeter

- Born: March 21, 1977 (age 49); Miami, Florida, U.S.
- Genre: Jazz
- Occupation: Musician
- Instrument: Trumpet
- Labels: Posi-Tone Records, Lofijazzsoul Records, Formation Sound
- Website: www.farnellnewton.com

Farnell Newton (born March 21, 1977) is a composer and jazz trumpeter.

Farnell Newton was born in Miami, Florida, and moved to Philadelphia in 1992, where he attended the Philadelphia High School for Creative and Performing Arts. While in Philadelphia, Newton also studied with his uncles, saxophonist/arranger Conny Murray and Sunny Murray, one of the early avant garde’s most inventive and influential drummers.

Newton graduated from the Denver School of the Arts after moving to Denver in 1994 and then moved to Ohio to study at the Oberlin Conservatory of Music. At Oberlin, Newton studied music performance with an emphasis in jazz and was mentored by Wendell Logan and trumpeter Kenny Davis. Newton performed with Aretha Franklin, James Moody, Muhal Richard Abrams, and Hugh Ragin while at Oberlin.

After graduating from Oberlin, Newton moved to Portland, Oregon, where he performed regularly with drummer Mel Brown, percussionist Bobby Torres, Akbar Depriest, and many others. He earned a Master’s degree in Jazz Studies and Performance from Portland State University in 2008.

After completing his graduate work, Newton toured extensively with three time Grammy award-winning singer-songwriter Jill Scott and with the Legendary Rhinestone Rockstar Bassist “Bootsy” Collins.

When he is not spending time with his family, leading his funk band (The Othership Connection), or hosting his own jazz radio show at KMHD 89.1fm, he is touring & recording. Over the years Farnell has performed with Jarrod Lawson, Stevie Wonder, Skerik, Lettuce, Slightly Stoopid, Karl Denson, Galactic, Nigel Hall, Mike Phillips, and the Portland Cello Project. Newton also created a jazz social media group called Jam of the Week in 2013 which now features over 70,000 members worldwide.

== Discography ==
As leader

- 2011 Class Is Now in Session
- 2015 Ready To Roll
- 2017 Back To Earth
- 2019 Lofijazzsoul
- 2019 7 Days of Rain
- 2019 Lofi Nights
- 2019 Rippin' & Runnin'
- 2020 Wake Up
- 2021 Feel The Love
- 2021 7 Days of Rain Vol. 2

As guest

- 2006 Liv Warfield, Embrace Me
- 2006 Stolen Sweets, Shuffle off to Buffalo
- 2006 Mike Van Liew, Polyglot
- 2007 Lifesavas, Gutterfly
- 2007 Othello, Alive at the Assembly Line
- 2007 Caña Son, Self Titled
- 2008 Pete Krebs, Pete Krebs Trio
- 2008 Willy Vlautin, A Jockeys Christmas
- 2009 Portland Jazz Orchestra, Good Morning Geek
- 2010 Hidden Beach, Unwrapped Vol. 7
- 2011 Bootsy Collins, Tha Funk Capital of the World
- 2011 DJ Kemit, Everlasting
- 2011 The Chicharones, Swine Flew
- 2014 The Yumatics, 90 Miles to Yuma
- 2015 Dirty Revival, Dirty Revival
- 2016 Xperience, Chasing Grace
- 2016 Mic Capes, Concrete Dreams
- 2016 Princess Freesia, Stellarsonic!
- 2017 Avery Sunshine, Twenty Sixty Four
- 2018 Ants Ants Ants, Why Why Why?
- 2018 Chance Hayden, Get Somethin'
- 2019 Tyrone Hendrix, Rhythm on Life Vol. 2
- 2019 Michalangela, As I See It
- 2019 14KT, For My Sanity
- 2019 Ezra Weiss, We Limit Not The Truth of God
- 2020 Nimzo, Resonance Theory
- 2020 Will Jordan, Be Good
- 2020 Mike Phillips, Pulling Off The Covers
- 2020 Raheem DeVaughn, What a Time to Bein Love
- 2020 Donte Thomas, how you like them APPLES?
- 2020 Tales of Wonder, A Jazz Celebration of Stevie
- 2021 Lofijazzsoul, Winter Soulstive 2020
- 2021 Posi-tone Swingtet, One for 25
- 2021 Jon Corbin, Stay Right Here
- 2021 2 that Native, Everything Is Golden
- 2021 JxJury, Dope Dealer.
- 2021 DJ O.G. One, Testimony
- 2022 MicCapes, In Spite Of
- 2022 Milc, Windbreaker
- 2022 Cartoons, Homegrown
