= Sandy Block =

American jazz musician

- Also known as: Sid Block
- Born: January 16, 1917; Cleveland, Ohio, U.S.
- Died: October 1, 1985 (aged 68)
- Genres: Jazz
- Instrument: Double bass

Sandy Block, also credited as Sid Block (January 16, 1917 – October 1985) was an American jazz bassist.

== Early life ==
Block played violin as a child, and grew up in Cleveland and Brooklyn. He picked up bass in high school and worked professionally in big bands from the late 1930s.

== Career ==
Block worked with Van Alexander, Chick Webb, Alvino Rey, and Tommy Dorsey and recorded with Louis Armstrong and Ella Fitzgerald. He played with Charlie Parker and Dizzy Gillespie on one of the few television appearances left of Parker.

After the 1950s, Block worked extensively as a studio musician, including for folk ensembles such as The Greenbriar Boys. He played with Jimmy McPartland and Johnny Costa, but went into semi-retirement after the 1960s.
