= Darko Jurković =

Croatian jazz guitarist and composer (born 1965)

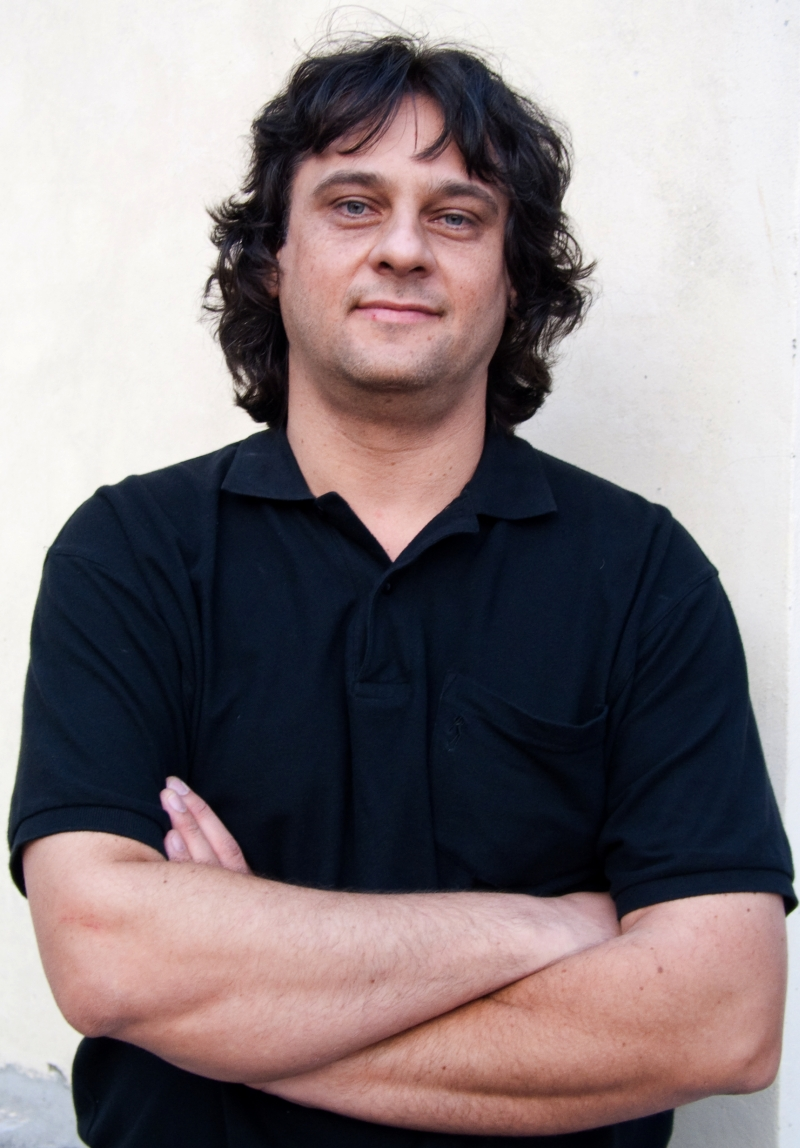
Darko Jurković

Darko "Charlie" Jurković (born 20 April 1965 in Rijeka, Croatia) is a Croatian jazz guitarist and composer.

== Biography ==
Jurković initially received classical music training on violin, before he changed his interest to jazz and guitar at the age of 15. Influenced by guitarists like Pat Metheny, John Scofield and especially Stanley Jordan he dedicated himself to this instrument. Like Jordan, he started making notes on the instrument with both hands. He masters this technique of Two-Hand-Tapping completely, so that he can simultaneously play on two guitars melody and bass. Until 1997, he studied at the University of Music and Performing Arts in Graz with Harry Pepl, completing his master's degree.

There after he played in bands like the Kvartet Sensitive, in the Europlane Orchestra and in the band of Boško Petrović, including with Emil Spányi and Gino Comisso, but he also played in the trio of František Uhlíř (including live recordings with Dusko Goykovich). Under his own name, he put three albums and two as co-leaders. He toured not only through Central Europe, France and Turkey, but also in South America.

== Honors ==
Jurković was honored in the years 2000, 2002, 2003, 2004, 2006, 2007 and 2008 with the award of the Croatian Musicians Union for the best jazz guitarist; he also won the Porin Prize.

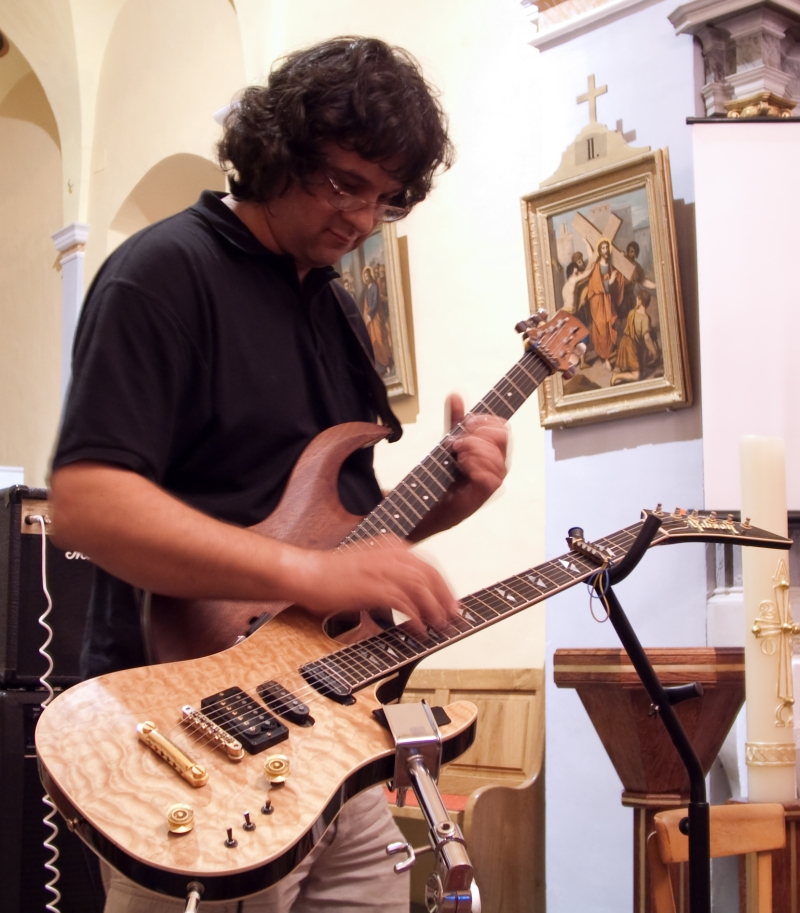
Darko Jurković beim two hand tapping

== Discography ==
- My Contribution (Gis Records, 1999)
- Live 2002 (JUH Music, 2003)
- František Uhlíř May Be Later (Vltava/Arta, 2008)
- Alla Maniera (SIPA, 2010)
- Goran Končar & Darko Jurković Jazz Quartet Meeting Point (Croatia Records, 2015)
- Matija Dedić & Darko Jurković Charlie Jazzy Bach (Croatia Records, 2015)
