= Brynjar Rasmussen =

- Born: 30 June 1977 (age 49); Nordfjordeid, Sogn og Fjordane
- Origin: Norway
- Genres: Jazz
- Occupations: Musician, music producer, composer
- Instrument: Clarinet
- Label: Finito Bacalao Records
- Website: nordnorsk.jazzinorge.no/2011/04/27/352

Brynjar Rasmussen (born 30 June 1977 in Nordfjordeid, Sogn og Fjordane) is a Norwegian jazz musician (clarinet), brother of accordion player, photographer, social commentator, and botanist Sigve Brochmann Rasmussen (b. 1972), known from performing in bands such as Christiansand String Swing Ensemble, and for writing the commissioned work Arctic Mood for the Polar Jazz Festival in Longyearbyen (2011).

== Career ==
Rasmussen was known as the clarinetist in the Dixi jazz band Christiansand String Swing Ensemble. In addition to being a performing artist, he also works as composer, and is a music producer for Nordnorsk Jazzsenter. When he went to Svalbard in 2006, the fascination for the Arctic was spontaneous. He has visited Svalbard many times since then, and eventually released his debut solo album Arctic Mood (2011), composed as a commissioned work for the most northern, Polar Jazz Festival in Longyearbyen.

== Discography (in selection) ==
=== Solo albums ===
- 2011: Arctic Mood (Nordnorsk Jazzsenter, Finito Bacalao Records), a commissioned work for the PolarJazz Festival in Longyearbyen

=== Collaborations ===
Within Christianssand String Swing Ensemble

- 2001: I Paris (CSSE Records)
- 2005: Sirkushesten Igor (Vogna Music)
- 2011: Christianssand String Swing Ensemble(CSSE Records)

With Elin Kåven

- 2009: Jikŋon musihkka/Frozen music (Nordic Notes)
