= Keg Purnell =

American jazz musician

William "Keg" Purnell (January 7, 1915 - June 25, 1965) was an American drummer. His influences include Chick Webb and Big Sid Catlett.

Purnell was born in Charleston, West Virginia in 1915. He studied at West Virginia State College from 1932 to 1934, and played with the Campus Revellers while there. He toured with King Oliver in 1934–35, then played freelance and with his own trio in the late 1930s. In 1939, he worked with Thelonious Monk.

Purnell played in the bands of Benny Carter (1939–41), Claude Hopkins (1941–42), and Eddie Heywood (1942–52). He also recorded with Rex Stewart, Teddy Wilson, and Willie "The Lion" Smith. Late in his career he played with Snub Mosley (1957 and subsequently).
