= Gösta Törner (musician) =

Swedish trumpeter

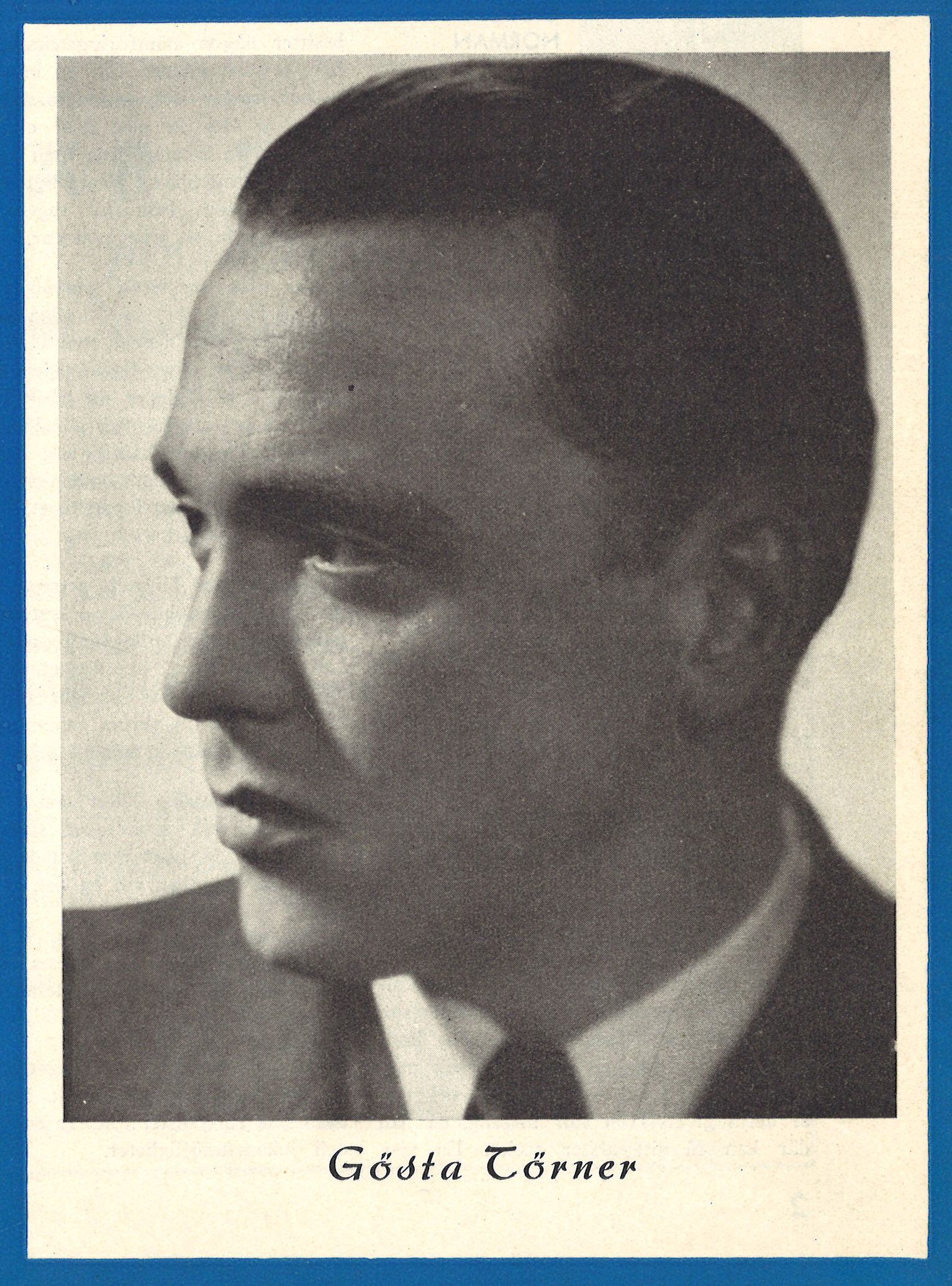
Gösta Törner

Gösta Törner (27 October 1912 – 11 October 1982 was a Swedish jazz trumpeter and bandleader. He was born and died in Stockholm, and was one of the first musicians to play hot jazz in Sweden. He worked extensively both as a session musician on recordings and with his own groups on Swedish national radio from the 1940s to the 1960s.
