= Paloma Efron =

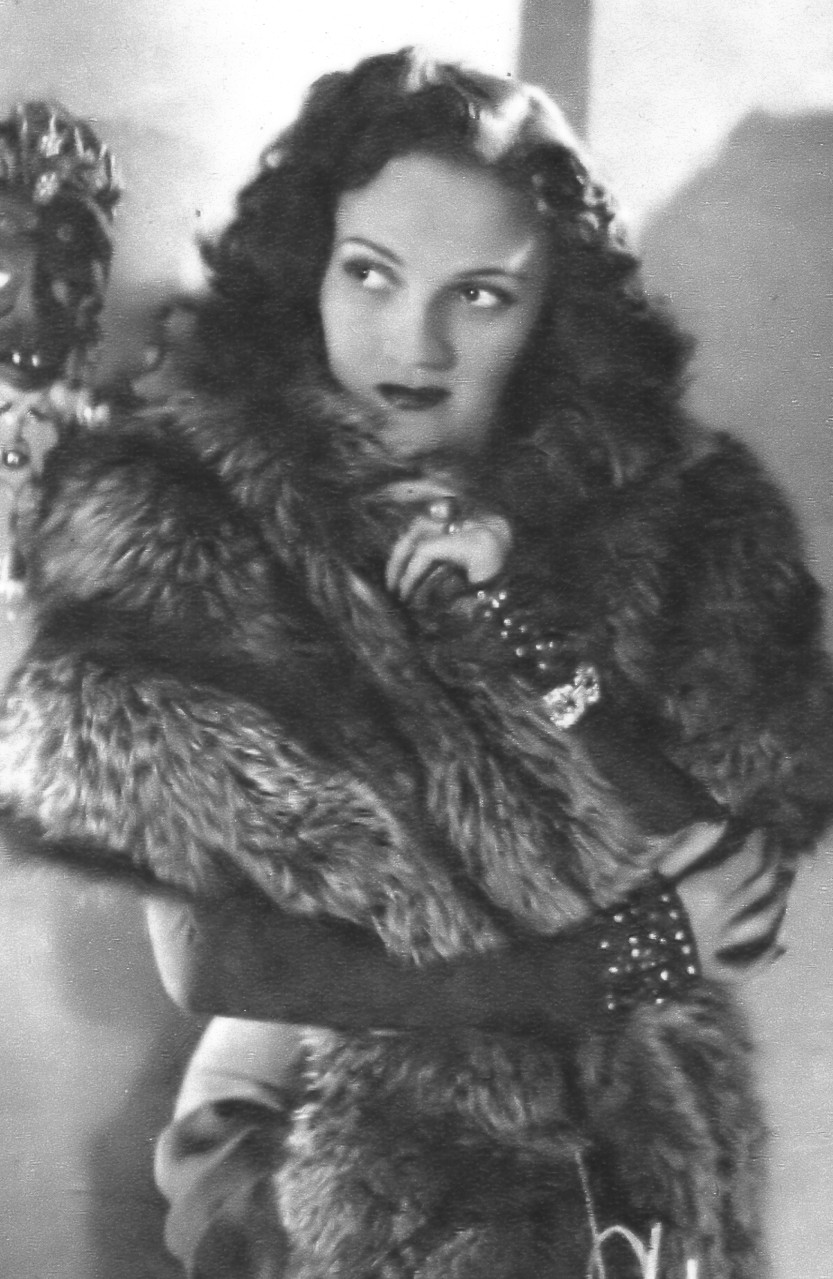
Blackie in 1946.

Paloma Efron, also known as Blackie, (born 6 December 1912, died 3 September 1977) was an Argentine radio and television journalist and the country's first professional jazz singer.

== Biography ==
Efron was born in Entre Ríos Province, Argentina, the child of an Ashkenazi Jewish father, the educator Jedidio Efron. The family moved to Buenos Aires, and there, at age 5, Efron began to study music. When Efron was fourteen, her mother fell ill, and for two years Efron looked after her. After her mother got better, Efron got a job as a librarian at the Instituto Cultural Argentino Norteamericano. There, she started listening to and learning about Black spirituals, at the time an unknown genre in Argentina. Early praise by Carlos Gardel (the "king of tango") led her to enter a radio contest in 1934, in which she won first prize with her rendition of "Stormy Weather". In the same contest, listeners gave her the nickname "Blackie".
