= 1969 in jazz =

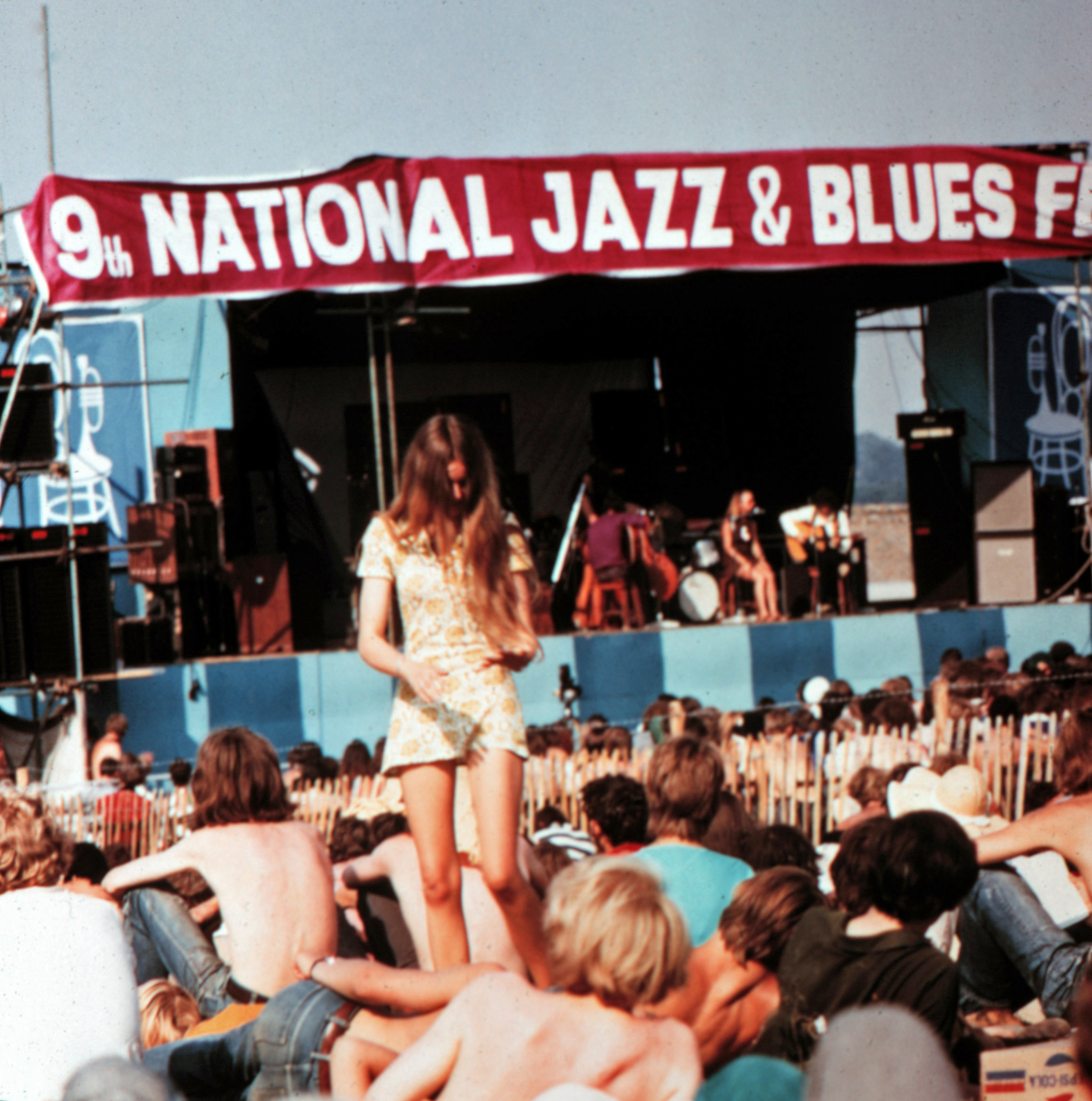
- National Jazz & Blues Festival, Plumpton, August 1969
- Decade: 1960s in jazz
- Music: 1969 in music
- Standards: List of post-1950 jazz standards
- See also: 1968 in jazz – 1970 in jazz

This is a timeline documenting events of Jazz in the year 1969.

== Events ==
The New England Conservatory becomes the first traditional music conservatory to offer a jazz studies course.

=== June ===
- 18
  - The 3rd Montreux Jazz Festival started in Montreux, Switzerland (June 18 – 22).

=== July ===
- 3 – The 16th Newport Jazz Festival started in Newport, Rhode Island (July 3 – 6).
  - The 1st day featured Sun Ra and Space Arkestra, Bill Evans / Jeremy Steig, and George Benson
  - The 2nd day featured Jeff Beck Group, Ten Years After, and Jethro Tull (Recorded)
  - The 3rd day featured Frank Zappa & The Mothers Of Invention, John Mayall, and Miles Davis Quintet (Recorded)
  - The 4th day featured Sly & The Family Stone, O.C. Smith, and Dave Brubeck.

=== August ===
- 18 – The 9th National Jazz and Blues Festival started in Plumpton, East Sussex, England (August 8 – 10).
- 19 – Trumpeter Miles Davis uses a wah-wah pedal on Bitches Brew (August 19 – 21).

=== September ===
- 19 – The 12th Monterey Jazz Festival started in Monterey, California (September 19 – 21).

== Album releases ==
- Bill Evans: Quiet Now
- Don Cherry: Mu
- Pharoah Sanders: Karma
- Miles Davis: In a Silent Way
- Art Ensemble of Chicago: People in Sorrow
- George Russell: Electronic Sonata For Souls Loved By Nature
- Art Ensemble of Chicago: Reese and the Smooth Ones
- Kalaparusha Maurice McIntyre: Humility in the Light of the Creator
- Charlie Haden: Liberation Music Orchestra
- Dollar Brand: African Piano
- Gunter Hampel: The 8th of July 1969
- Roland Kirk: Rahsaan Rahsaan
- Pharoah Sanders: Jewels of Thought
- Archie Shepp: Yasmina, a Black Woman
- Art Ensemble of Chicago: A Jackson In Your House
- Charles Tolliver: The Ringer
- Joe McPhee: Underground Railroad
- Jan Garbarek: Esoteric Circle
- Ornette Coleman: Crisis
- Pharoah Sanders: Izipho Zam (My Gifts)
- Sunny Murray: Homage to Africa
- Chick Corea: Is
- Dewey Redman: Tarik
- Willem Breuker: Lunchconcert For Three Barrel-organs
- Joe Harriott: Hum-Dono
- Peter Brötzmann: Nipples
- Charles Earland: Black Talk!
- Wolfgang Dauner: Fuer
- Eric Kloss: To Hear Is To See!
- Leon Thomas: Spirits Known and Unknown
- Miroslav Vitous: Mountain in the Clouds
- Tony Williams: Emergency!
- Archie Shepp: Blasé
- Dollar Brand: African Sketchbook
- John McLaughlin: Extrapolation
- Wayne Shorter: Super Nova
- Stanley Cowell: Blues for the Viet Cong
- Stanley Cowell: Brilliant Circles
- Wolfgang Dauner: The Oimels
- Horace Tapscott: West Coast Hot
- Liberation Music Orchestra: Liberation Music Orchestra

== Deaths ==
January

- 4 – Paul Chambers, American bassist (born 1935).
- 19 – Alcide Pavageau, American upright bassist (born 1888).

February

- 15 – Pee Wee Russell, American clarinetist (born 1906).
- 17 – Paul Barbarin, New Orleans drummer (born 1899).

March

- 25 – Billy Cotton, English bandleader (born 1899).

April

- 23 – Krzysztof Komeda, Polish film music composer and jazz pianist (haematoma) (born 1931).
- 24 – René Compère, Belgian trumpeter (born 1906).

May

- 19 – Coleman Hawkins, American tenor saxophonist (born 1904).

June

- 1 – Stan Brenders, Belgian jazz pianist and bandleader (born 1904).
- 2 – Albert Stinson, American upright bassist (born 1944).
- 10 – Wilbur Harden, American trumpeter, flugelhornist and composer (born 1924).
- 14
  - Roberto Firpo, Argentine tango pianist (born 1884).
  - Wynonie Harris, American blues shouter and rhythm and blues singer (born 1915).

July

- 14 – Ernie Farrow, American pianist, bassist, and drummer (born 1928).

August

- 7 – Russ Morgan, American big band orchestra leader (born 1904).
- 14 – Tony Fruscella, American trumpeter (born 1927).

September

- 9 – Cedric Haywood, American pianist (born 1914).

October

- 10 – Manuel Manetta, American multi-instrumentalist (born 1889).
- 14 – Bill McKinney, American drummer (born 1895).
- 19 – Booker Pittman, American clarinetist (born 1909).
- 22 – Nate Kazebier, American trumpeter (born 1912).
- 29 – Pops Foster, American string bassist, who also played tuba and trumpet (born 1892).
- 30 – Tony Sbarbaro, American drummer (born 1897).
- 31 – Tony Pastor, Italian-American novelty singer and tenor saxophonist (born 1907).

November

- 2 – Slick Jones, American drummer (born 1907).
- 14 – Johnny Bayersdorffer, New Orleans cornetist and bandleader (born 1899).
- 18 – Ted Heath, English trombonist and big-band leader (born 1902).

December

- 9 – Bobby Henderson, American pianist and trumpeter (born 1920).
- 16 – Leo Mathisen, Danish pianist, composer, arranger, singer, and bandleader (born 1906)
- 26 – Jiří Šlitr, Czech songwriter, pianist, singer, actor, and painter (born 1924).

== Births ==
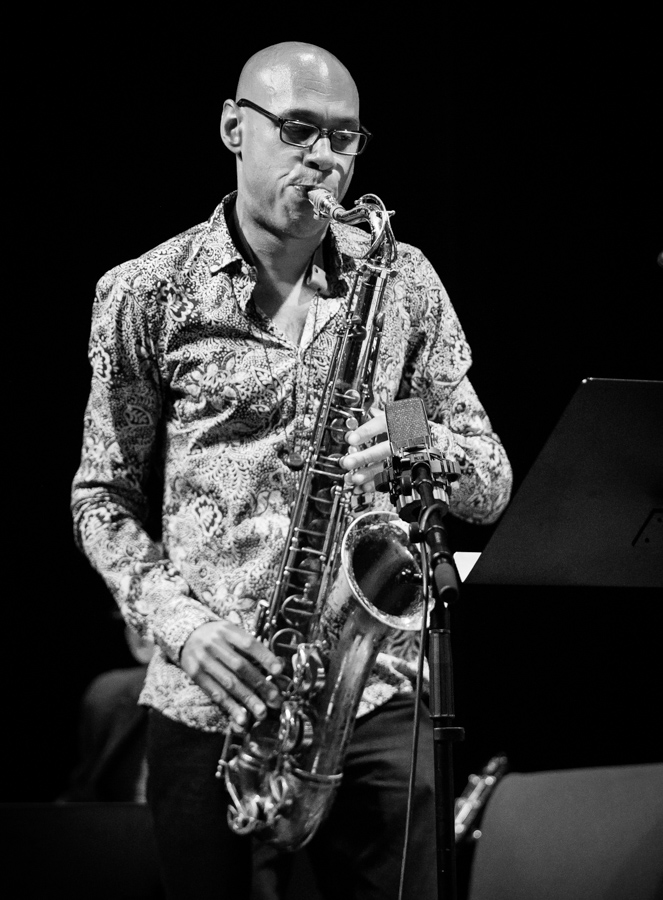
Joshua Redman at the 2017 Kongsberg Jazzfestival.

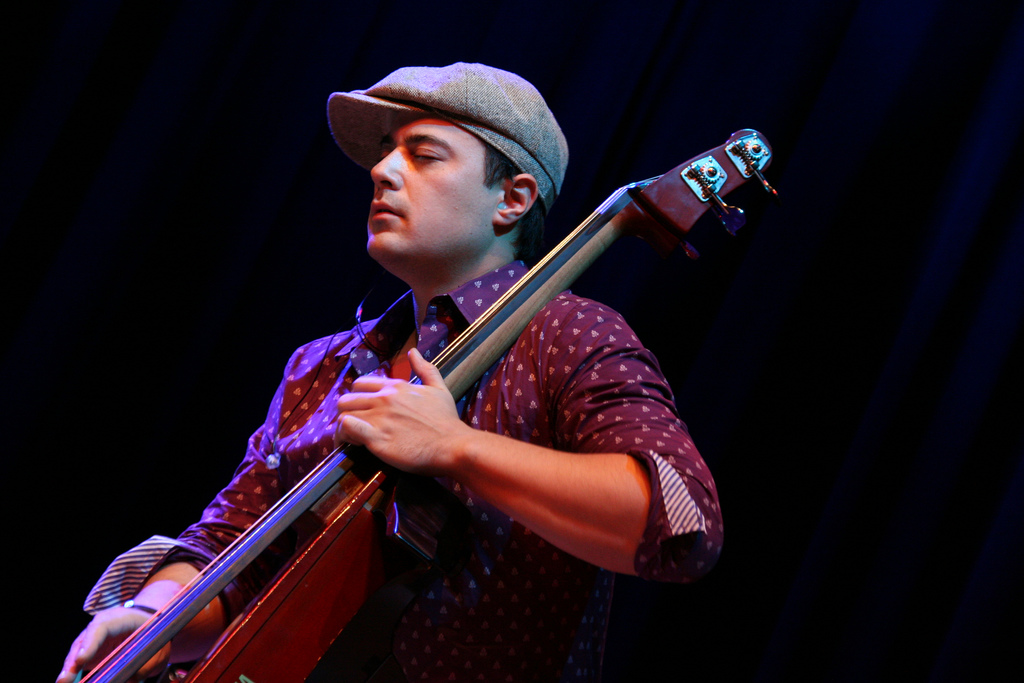
Chris Minh Doky in 2008.

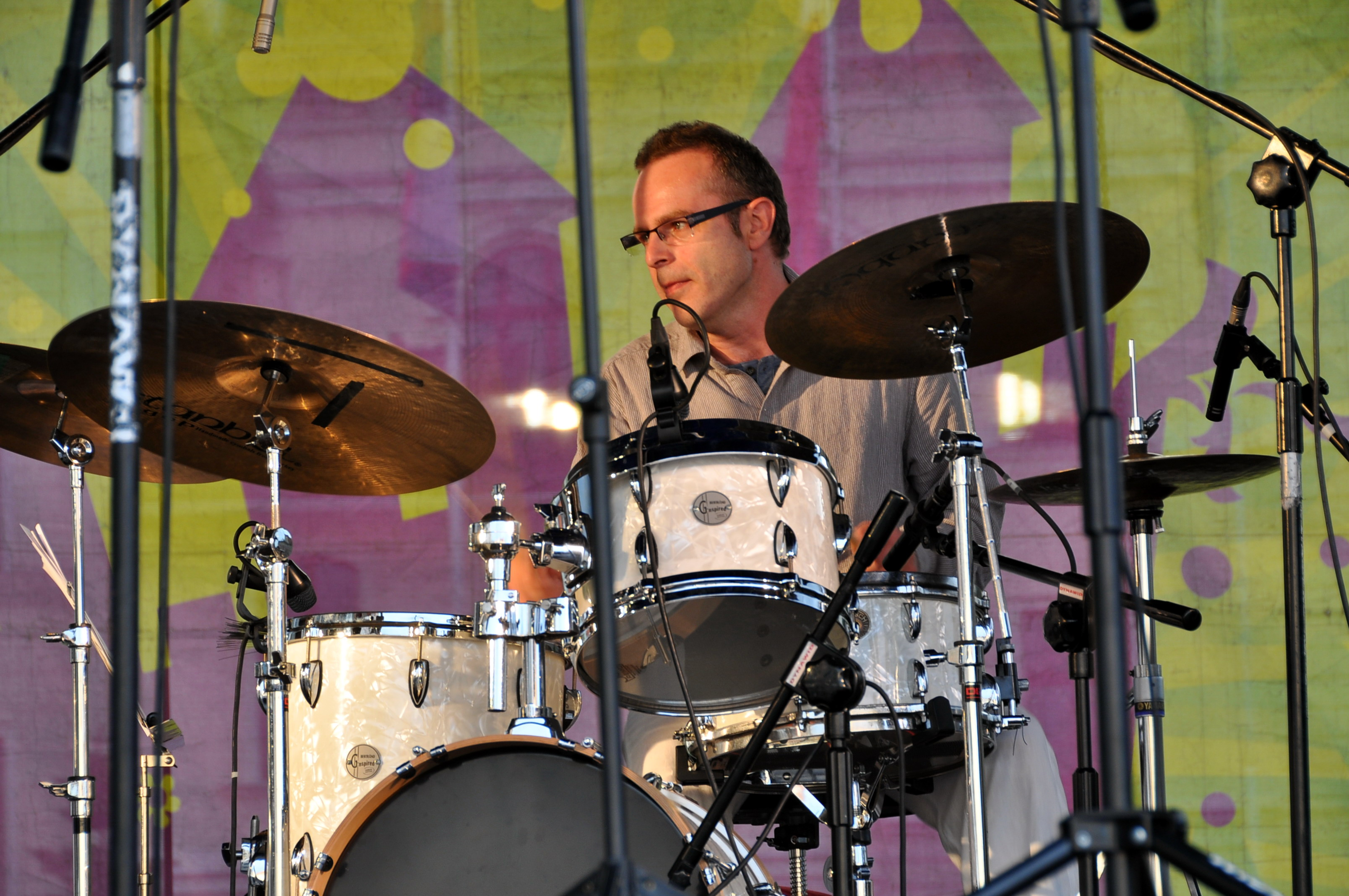
Marcin Jahr in 2011.

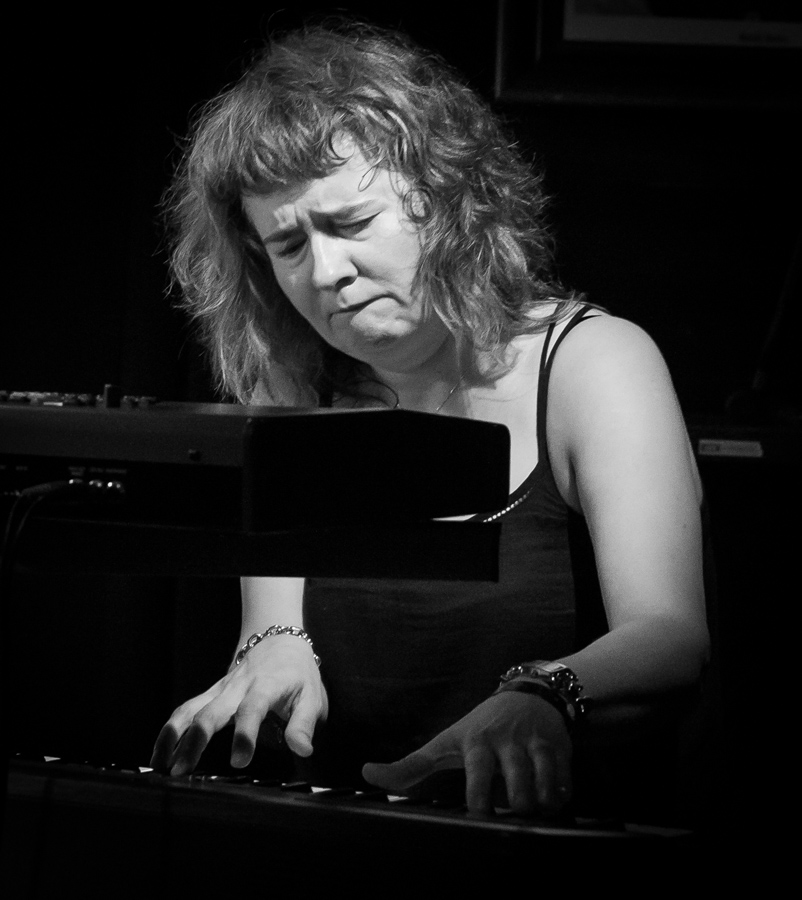
Olga Konkova at Buckleys during the 2016 Oslo Jazzfestival.

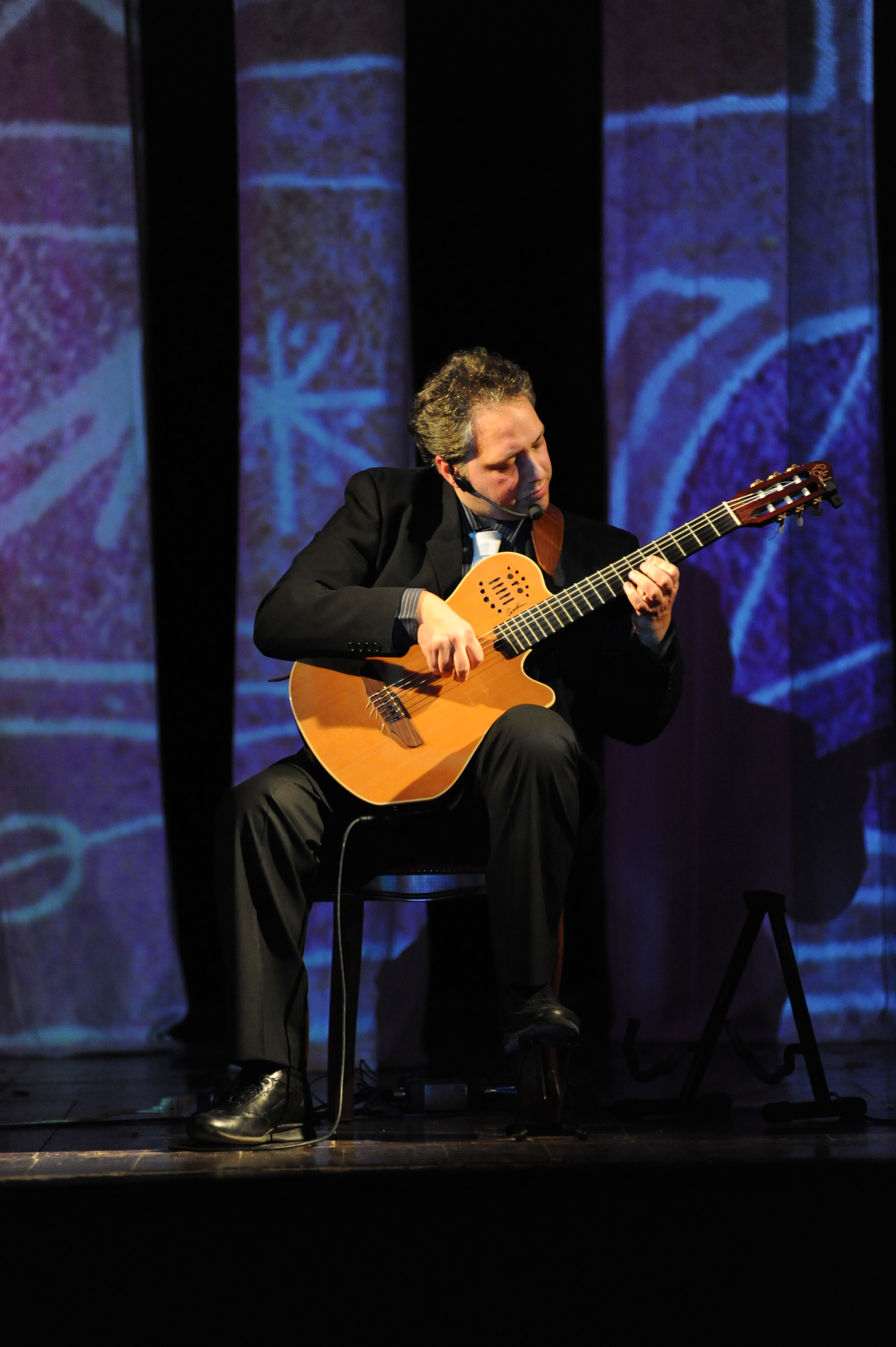
Francesco Buzzurro in 2008.

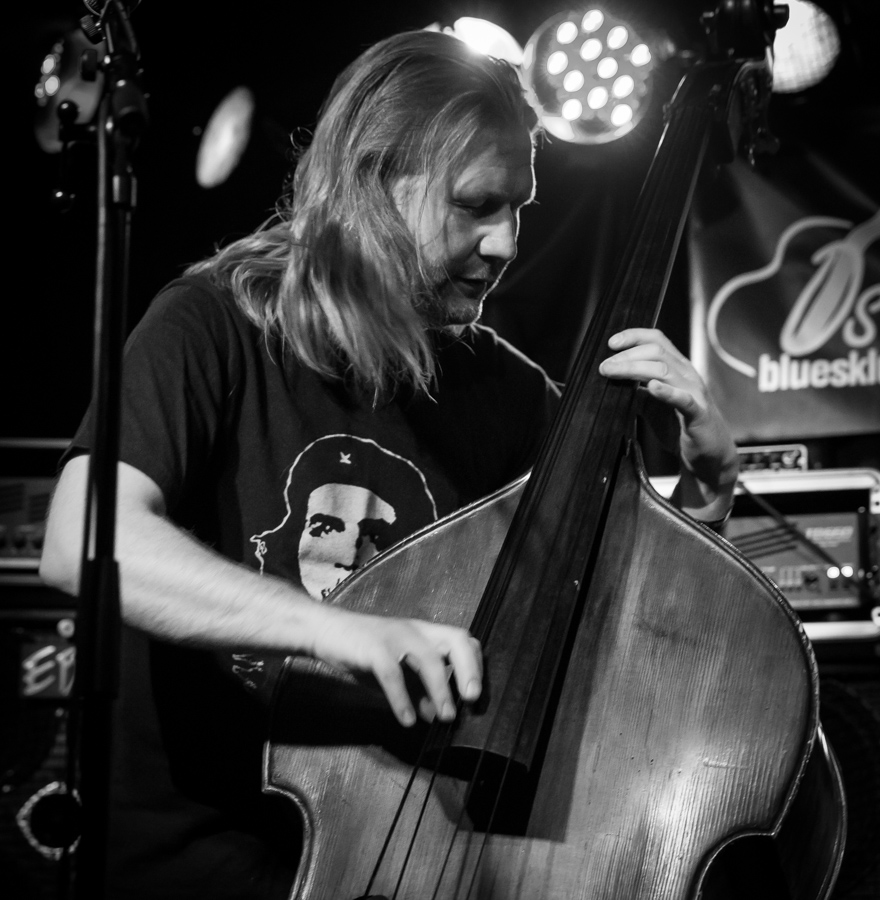
Per Mathisen at Buckleys, during the 2016 Oslo Jazzfestival.

January

- 3 – James Carter, American saxophonist, flautist, and bass clarinetist.
- 24 – Duane Eubanks, American trumeter and flugelhornist.

February

- 1 – Joshua Redman, American saxophonist.
- 6 – Scott Amendola, American drummer.
- 7 – Chris Minh Doky, Danish bassist.
- 14 – Stefano di Battista, Italian saxophonist.
- 22 – Ståle Storløkken, Norwegian organist and keyboardist.

March

- 10 – Travis Shook, American pianist and songwriter.
- 13 – Stephen Scott, American pianist.
- 22 – Asaf Sirkis, Israeli drummer, composer, and educator.
- 25 – Marcin Jahr, Polish drummer.
- 29 – Jason Rebello, British pianist, songwriter, and record producer.

April

- 9 – Giovanni Allevi, Italian pianist and composer.
- 23 – Trude Eick, Norwegian hornist.
- 24 – Rebecca Martin, American singer and songwriter.
- 29 – Thomas Winther Andersen, Norwegian bassist.
- 30 – Michel Delville, Belgian guitarist, writer, and critic.

May

- 6 – Mathilde Grooss Viddal, Norwegian saxophonist.
- 12 – Erlend Skomsvoll, Norwegian pianist, composer, and orchestra leader, Come Shine.
- 22 – Carl Craig, American producer of techno music.
- 23 – Mindi Abair, American saxophonist, vocalist, and author.

June

- 2 – Kate Michaels, American singer.
- 11
  - Assif Tsahar, Israeli avant-garde tenor saxophonist and bass clarinetist.
  - Michael Lington, American saxophonist.
- 22 – Régis Huby, French violinist, composer, and arranger.

July

- 4 – Carolyn Breuer, German saxophonist.
- 7 – Svein Olav Herstad, Norwegian pianist.
- 27 – Edward Simon, Venezuelan pianist and composer.

August

- 4 – Dylan Howe, English drummer, bandleader, session musician, and composer, The Blockheads.
- 16 – Kate Higgins, American voice actress, singer, and pianist.
- 25
  - Olga Konkova, Russian-Norwegian pianist and composer.
  - Øyvind Brække (August 25), Norwegian trombonist.
- 28 – Na Yoon-sun, South Korean singer.

September

- 14 – Denys Baptiste, British tenor and soprano saxophonist.
- 16
  - Ayako Shirasaki, Japanese pianist and composer.
  - Roy Paci, Italian trumpeter, singer, composer, and arranger.
- 19
  - Cuong Vu, Vietnam-born avant-garde fusion trumpeter.
  - Candy Dulfer, Dutch alto saxophonist and singer.
- 26 – Peter Asplund, Swedish trumpeter, singer, and composer.

October

- 1 – Ori Kaplan, Israeli avant-garde saxophonist.
- 4 – Mat Maneri, American composer, improviser, and jazz violin and viola player
- 7
  - Francesco Buzzurro, Italian guitarist and composer.
  - Per Mathisen, Norwegian bassist and composer.
- 8 – Gulleiv Wee, Norwegian bassist, The September When.
- 16 – Roy Hargrove, American trumpeter (died 2018).
- 27
  - Marek Napiórkowski, Polish guitarist and composer.
  - Stéphane Galland, Belgian drummer.
- 31 – Catherine Delaunay, French clarinetist and composer.

November

- 25 – Kim Ofstad, Norwegian drummer, D'Sound.
- 29 – Fredrik Ljungkvist, Swedish saxophonist and clarinetist, Atomic.

December

- 6 – Daniel Tinte, Argentinian pianist and composer.
- 19 – Aziza Mustafa Zadeh, Azerbaijani scat singer, pianist and composer.
- 31 – Joyce Cooling, American guitarist, vocalist, and songwriter.

Unknown date

- Adrian Fry, British trombonist.
- Alon Yavnai, Israel-born pianist and composer.
- Guillermo Klein, Argentine pianist and composer.
- Lelo Nika, Serbian-born Romanian-Romani accordionist.
- Lucian Ban, Romanian jazz pianist.
- Per "Ruskträsk" Johansson, Swedish saxophonist, flautist, and clarinettist.
- Per «Texas» Johansson, Swedish saxophonist and clarinettist.
- Ricardo Martinez, Venezuelan bass guitarist.
- Thomas Fryland, Danish trumpeter.

== See also ==
- 1960s in jazz
- List of years in jazz
- 1969 in music
