= 1988 in jazz =

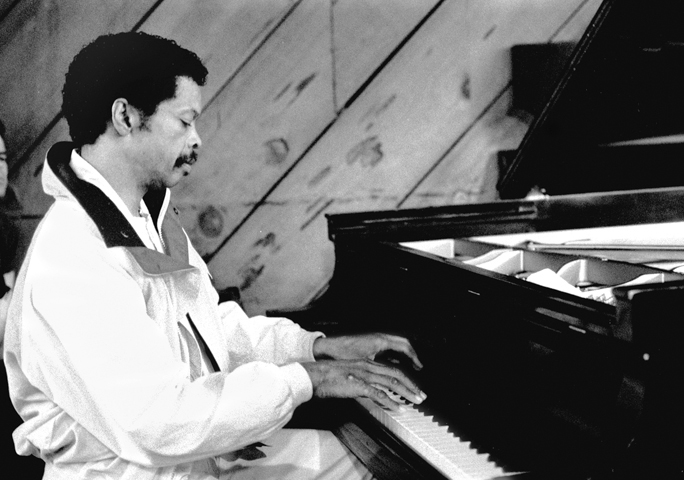
- Don Pullen, Half Moon Bay CA June 13, 1988
- Decade: 1980s in jazz
- Music: 1988 in music
- Standards: List of post-1950 jazz standards
- See also: 1987 in jazz – 1989 in jazz

This is a timeline documenting events of Jazz in the year 1988.

== Events ==
=== March ===
- 25 – The 15th Vossajazz started in Vossavangen, Norway (March 25 – 27).

=== April ===
- 6 – Jazz guitarist Larry Carlton is shot in a random gun shooting outside his Los Angeles studios.

=== May ===
- 20 – The 17th Moers Festival started in Moers, Germany (May 20 – 23).
- 25 – The 16th Nattjazz started in Bergen, Norway (May 25 – June 8).

=== June ===
- 30 – The 22nd Montreux Jazz Festival started in Montreux, Switzerland (June 30 – July 16).

=== July ===
- 1 – The 9th Montreal International Jazz Festival started in Montreal, Quebec, Canada (July 1 – 10).
- 8 – The 13th North Sea Jazz Festival started in The Hague, Netherlands (July 8 – 10).

=== August ===
- 19 – The 5th Brecon Jazz Festival started in Brecon, Wales (April 19 – 21).

=== September ===
- 16 – The 31st Monterey Jazz Festival started in Monterey, California (September 16 – 18).

== Album releases ==
- Bill Frisell: Before We Were Born
- Henry Threadgill: Rag, Bush and All
- Turtle Island String Quartet: Turtle Island String Quartet
- Lyle Mays: Street Dreams
- Dave Holland: Triplicate
- Jackie McLean: Dynasty
- John Carter: Fields
- Leni Stern: Secrets
- Microscopic Septet: Beauty Based on Science
- Music Revelation Ensemble: Music Revelation Ensemble
- Willem Breuker: Psalm 122
- Steve Turre: Fire and Ice
- Trilok Gurtu: Usfret
- Bobby Previte: Claude's Late Morning
- Bill Frisell: Lookout for Hope
- Misha Mengelberg: Impromptus
- Marcus Roberts: Truth is Spoken Here
- David Ware: Passage to Music
- David Liebman: Trio + One
- Freddie Hubbard: Stardust
- Gary Thomas: Code Violations
- Hilton Ruiz: El Camino
- Phil Woods: Evolution
- Ralph Moore: Rejuvenate
- Matthew Shipp & Rob Brown: Sonic Explorations

== Deaths ==
January

- 8 – Ray Bauduc, American drummer (born 1906).

February

- 24 – Miff Görling, Swedish bandleader, trombonist, arranger, and composer (born 1909).

March

- 1 – Tommy Potter, American upright-bassist (born 1918).
- 8 – Ken Colyer, English trumpeter and cornetist (born 1928).
- 20 – Gil Evans, Canadian pianist, arranger, composer and bandleader (born 1912).

April

- 3 – Kai Ewans, Danish reedist (born 1906).
- 15 – Eliza Doolittle, British singer-songwriter.
- 19 – Ed Burke, American violinist and trombonist (born 1909).

May

- 13 – Chet Baker, American trumpeter and singer (born 1929).
- 28 – Sy Oliver, American trumpeter, singer, composer, arranger and bandleader (born 1910).

July

- 2 – Eddie Vinson, American alto saxophonist and blues shouter (born 1917).

August

- 15 – Bill Beason, American drummer (born 1908).
- 27 – Irene Higginbotham, African American songwriter and concert pianist (born 1918).

September

- 5 – Lawrence Brown, American trombonist (born 1907).
- 27 – J. C. Heard, American drummer (born 1917).

October

- 8 – Edward Inge, American arranger and reedist (born 1906).

November

- 30
  - Charlie Rouse, American hard bop tenor saxophonist and flautist (born 1924).
  - Pannonica de Koenigswarter, British-born jazz patron and writer (born 1913).

December

- 8
  - Gene Quill, American alto saxophonist (born 1927).
  - Thore Swanerud, Swedish pianist, vibraphonist, arranger, conductor, and composer (born 1919).

Unknown date

- Barney Josephson, founder of Café Society in Greenwich Village (born 1902).

== Births ==
January

- 28 – Casimir Liberski, Belgian pianist and keyboarder.

February

- 5 – Fredrik Luhr Dietrichson, Norwegian upright bassist.
- 26 – Christian Meaas Svendsen, Norwegian upright bassist.

April

- 1 – Sam Mtukudzi, Zimbabwean saxophonist and guitarist (died 2010).
- 22 – Nitcho Reinhardt, French guitarist.

May

- 29 – Kelly Sweet, American singer and songwriter.

May

- 2 – Guilherme Rodrigues, Portuguese composer, improviser, and sound artist.
- 7 – David Aleksander Sjølie, Norwegian guitarist.
- 17 – Brittany Anjou, American pianist, multi-instrumentalist, and composer.

July

- 31 – Andreas Wildhagen, Norwegian drummer.

August

- 17 – Natalie Sandtorv, Norwegian singer, percussionist, and electronica artist.
- 28 – Kjetil Jerve, Norwegian pianist and composer.

September

- 1 – Martina Bárta, Czech singer and French hornist.

October

- 19 – Pasquale Grasso, Italian guitarist.

November

- 25 – Victoria Hart, California-born English singer.
- 27 – Sandra Nankoma, Ugandan singer, songwriter and actress.

December

- 3 – Melissa Aldana, Chilean tenor saxophonist.
- 23 – Thomai Apergi, Greek singer and guitarist.

Unknown date

- Jan Martin Gismervik, Norwegian drummer, Monkey Plot.
- Simon Gore, Welch guitarist, keyboarder, composer, and audio/visual artist.

== See also ==
- 1980s in jazz
- List of years in jazz
- 1988 in music
