= 1970 in jazz =

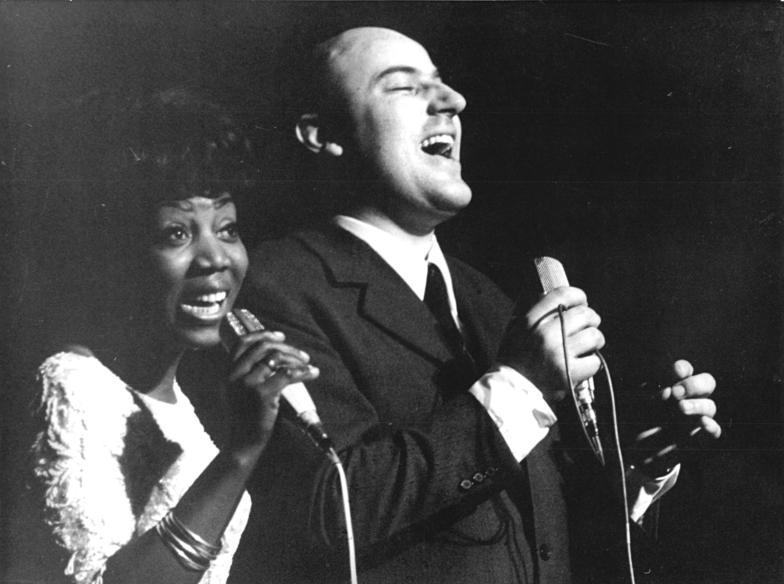
- Manfred Krug and Etta Cameron
- Decade: 1970s in jazz
- Music: 1970 in music
- Standards: List of post-1950 jazz standards
- See also: 1969 in jazz – 1971 in jazz

This is a timeline documenting events of Jazz in the year 1970.

== Events ==
=== June ===
- 17 – The 4th Montreux Jazz Festival started in Montreux, Switzerland (June 17 – 22).

=== July ===
- 10
  - Lee Morgan records Live at the Lighthouse (July 10 – 12), at the Lighthouse Café in Hermosa Beach, California.
  - The 17th Newport Jazz Festival started in Newport, Rhode Island (July 10 – 12).

=== September ===
- 18 – The 13th Monterey Jazz Festival started in Monterey, California (September 18 – 20).

== Album releases ==
- Bill Evans: Montreux II
- Bill Evans: Bill Evans Alone
- Paul Bley: Improvisie
- Marion Brown: Afternoon of a Georgia Faun
- Alice Coltrane: Ptah, the El Daoud
- McCoy Tyner: Extensions
- Art Ensemble of Chicago: Les Stances a Sophie
- Sonny Sharrock: Monkey-Pockie-Boo
- Freddie Hubbard: Straight Life
- Jan Garbarek: Afric Pepperbird
- Evan Parker: The Topography of the Lungs
- Spontaneous Music Ensemble: So What Do You Think
- Alice Coltrane: Journey in Satchidananda
- Pharoah Sanders: Deaf Dumb Blind (Summun Bukmun Umyun)
- Stanley Turrentine: Sugar
- Sun Ra and his Astro Infinity Arkestra: My Brother the Wind
- Woody Shaw: Blackstone Legacy
- Freddie Hubbard: Red Clay
- McCoy Tyner: Asante
- Miles Davis: Bitches' Brew
- Leon Thomas: The Leon Thomas Album
- Hubert Laws: Afro-Classic
- John McLaughlin: My Goal's Beyond
- ICP Orchestra: Groupcomposing
- Gunter Hampel: People Symphony
- Keith Tippett: Dedicated To You But You Weren't Listening
- Misha Mengelberg: Instant Composers Pool 005
- Gunter Hampel: Ballet-Symphony
- Chris McGregor: And the Brotherhood of Breath
- Joe McPhee: Nation Time
- Hugh Masekela: Reconstruction

== Deaths ==
January

- 16 – Lem Davis, American alto saxophonist (born 1914).
- 17 – Billy Stewart, American singer, drummer, and pianist (born 1937).

March

- 2 – Emile Barnes, American clarinetist (born 1892).
- 21 – Jack Sels, Belgian saxophonist and composer (born 1922).

April

- 10 – Ralph Escudero, Puerto Rican bassist and tubist (born 1898).
- 20 – Perry Bradford, African-American composer, songwriter, and vaudeville performer (born 1893).

May

- 10 – Frankie Lee Sims, American singer-songwriter and guitarist (born 1917).
- 11 – Johnny Hodges, American alto saxophonist (born 1906).
- 24 – Cliff Jackson, American pianist (born 1902).

June

- 16 – Lonnie Johnson, American singer and guitarist (born 1899).

July

- 26 – Fernando Arbello, Puerto Rican trombonist (born 1907).
- 31 – Booker Ervin, American saxophonist (born 1930).

August

- 4 – Scoops Carry, American saxophonist and clarinetist (born 1915).
- 5 – Otto Hardwick, American saxophonist (born 1904).

September

- 18 – Maxwell Davis, American saxophonist, arranger, and record producer (born 1916).

October

- 11 – Phil Spitalny, American bandleader (born 1890).
- 12 – Barney Rapp, American drummer and orchestra leader (born 1900).

November

- 20 – Don Stovall, American alto saxophonist (born 1913).
- 25 – Albert Ayler, American saxophonist and singer (born 1936).

December

- 14 – Elmer Schoebel, American pianist and composer (born 1896).

== Births ==
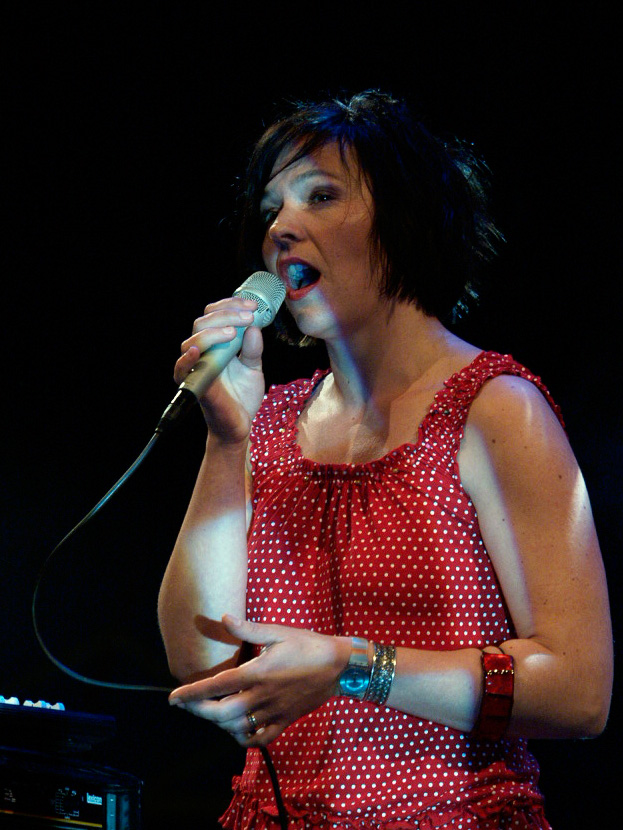
Eldbjørg Raknes at the 2007 Moers Festival.

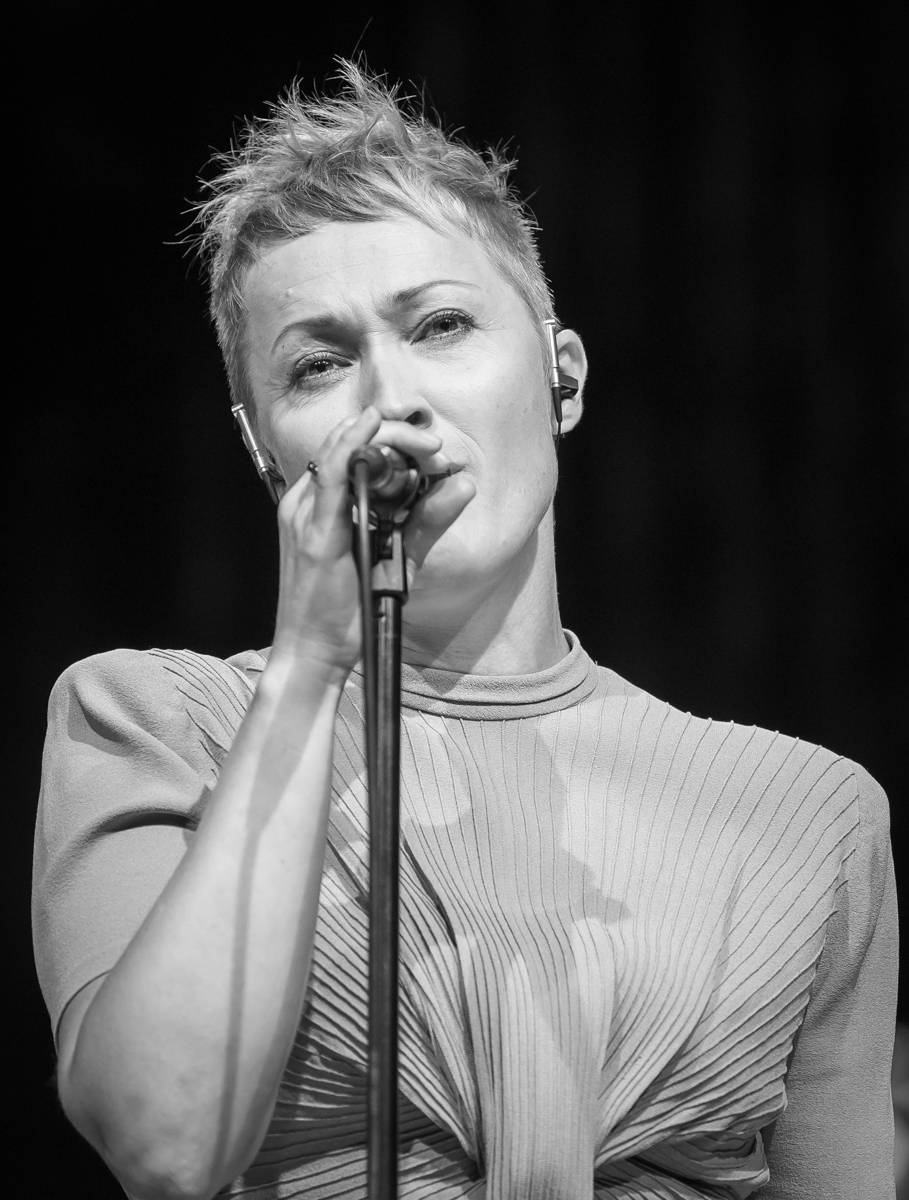
Live Maria Roggen at Sentralen during the 2016 Oslo Jazzfestival.

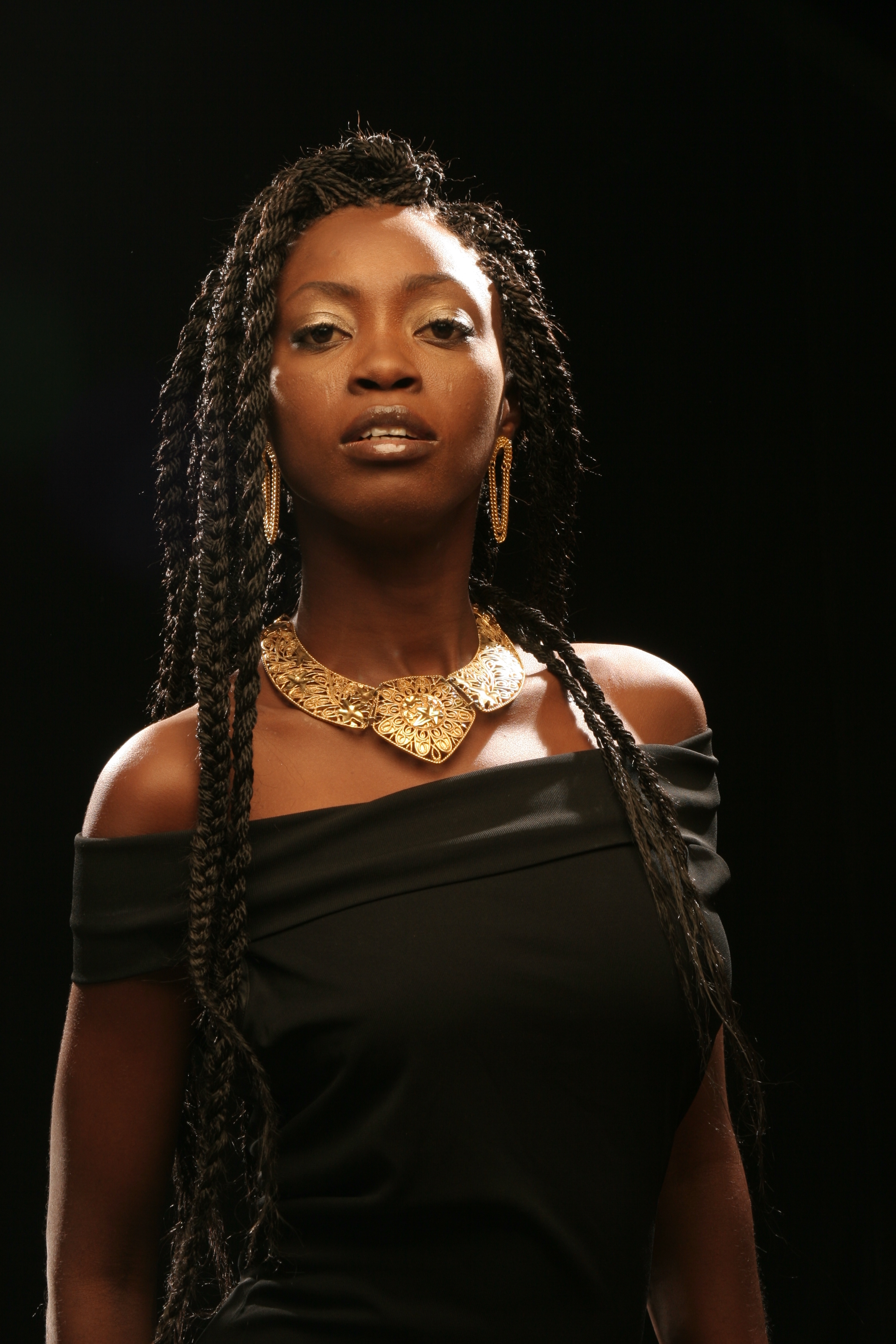
Yinka Davies 2005.

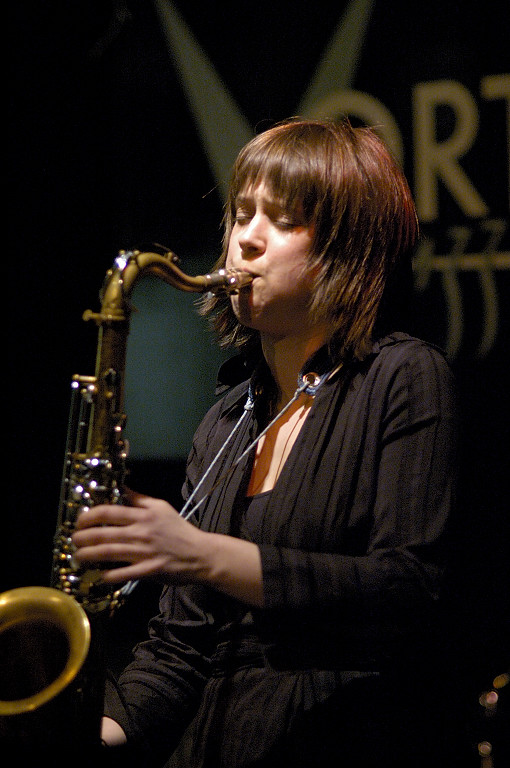
Ingrid Laubrock 2006.

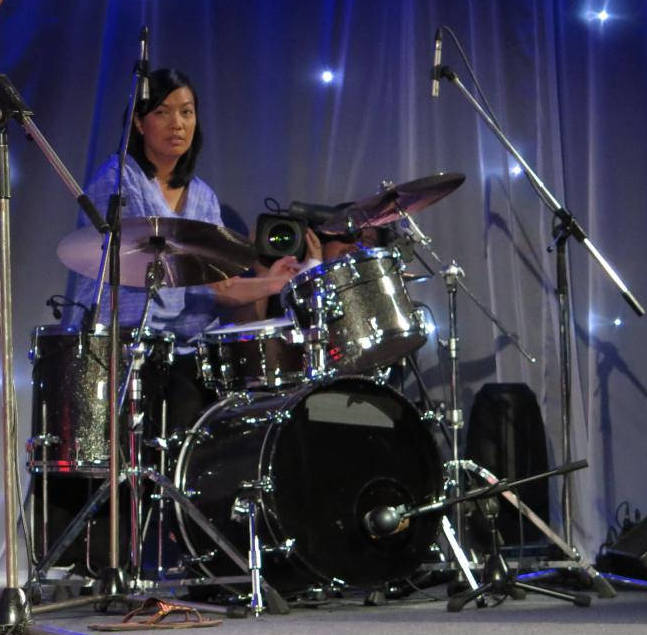
Susie Ibarra 2014.

January

- 1 – Karen Souza, Argentin singer.
- 4 – Michel Bisceglia, Belgian pianist.
- 5 – Jesper Bodilsen, Danish upright bassist.
- 19 – Iiro Rantala, Finnish pianist, Trio Töykeät.
- 24 – Adam Pierończyk, Polish saxophonist and composer.

February

- 9 – Eldbjørg Raknes, Norwegian singer.
- 13 – Adam Cruz, American drummer.
- 20
  - Craig Taborn, American pianist, organist, keyboardist and composer.
  - Éric Legnini, Belgian pianist and bandleader.
- 27 – Lina Nyberg, Swedish singer and composer.

March

- 11 – Justin Hayford, American singer and pianist.
- 19 – Harald Johnsen, Norwegian upright bassist (died 2011).
- 22 – Live Maria Roggen, Norwegian singer and composer, Come Shine.

April

- 1 – Tone Lise Moberg, Norwegian singer.
- 15 – Michael Schiefel, German singer.
- 20 – Avishai Cohen, Israeli bassist, composer, singer and arranger.
- 25 – Kjersti Stubø, Norwegian singer.

May

- 1 – Sacha Perry, American pianist and composer.
- 4
  - Giovanni Mirabassi, Italian pianist.
  - Jeremy Davenport, American trumpeter and singer.
- 6 – Juliet Kelly, British singer and songwriter.
- 22 – Jimmy Bennington, American drummer.

June

- 2 – Matt Garrison, American bassist.
- 10 – Dwayne Burno, American upright bassist (died 2013).
- 12 – Dave Maric, British composer and musician.
- 13 – Ron Westray, American trombonist, composer and educator.
- 16 – Gregory Hutchinson, American drummer.
- 21 – Eric Reed, American pianist and composer.
- 22 – Goran Kajfeš, Swedish trumpeter.
- 24 – Bernardo Sassetti, Portuguese pianist and film composer (died 2012).

July

- 6
  - Médéric Collignon, French vocalist, cornettist and saxhorn player.
  - Roger Cicero, German singer (died 2016).
- 13 – Glenn Corneille, Dutch pianist (died 2005).
- 14 – Jacob Young, Norwegian guitarist.
- 15 – Frank McComb, American soul singer and pianist.
- 16 – Yinka Davies, Nigerian vocalist, dancer, and lyricist.
- 17 – Alvester Garnett, American drummer.
- 25 – Brian Blade, American drummer, composer and singer-songwriter.
- 30 – Susanne Abbuehl, Swiss-Dutch singer.

August

- 1 – Kishon Khan, Bangladeshi-British pianist, composer, arranger, and music producer.
- 21
  - Marlon Jordan, American trumpeter, composer, and bandleader.
  - Simone Eriksrud, Norwegian singer and composer.
- 22 – Erik van der Luijt, Dutch pianist, composer, and band leader.
- 23 – Brad Mehldau, American pianist, composer, and arranger.
- 24 – Chris Tarry, Canadian bass guitarist.

, September

- 3 – Haydain Neale, Canadian singer-songwriter (died 2009).
- 24 – Ingrid Laubrock, German soprano, alto, tenor, and baritone saxophonist.
- 28 – Neil Yates, British trumpeter.

October

- 5 – Tord Gustavsen (October 5), Norwegian pianist and composer.
- 8 – Maria Kannegaard, Danish-born Norwegian pianist.
- 16 – Heine Totland, Norwegian singer.
- 19 – Jacob Karlzon, Swedish pianist and composer.
- 20 – Håvard Lund, Norwegian clarinetist and saxophonist.
- 22 – Manuel Mota, Portuguese guitarist.
- 23 – Tobias Sjögren, Swedish guitarist and composer.
- 24 – Jesse Harris, American singer-songwriter.
- 28 – Kurt Rosenwinkel, American guitarist, composer and keyboardist.
- 29 – Toby Smith, British keyboardist and songwriter for Jamiroquai (died 2017).

November

- 15 – Susie Ibarra, American composer and percussionist.
- 20 – Geoffrey Keezer, American pianist.
- 22 – Chris Fryar, American drummer.

December

- 14 – Anna Maria Jopek, Polish singer.
- 18 – Norman Brown, American guitarist.
- 24 – Marco Minnemann, German drummer, composer, and multi-instrumentalist.

Unknown date

- Andreas Paolo Perger, Austrian guitarist, improviser, and composer.
- Anna Mjöll, Icelandic singer and songwriter.
- Dominic Green, British writer and guitarist.
- Kate McGarry, American singer.
- Keith Anderson, American saxophonist.
- Lullaby Baxter, Canadian singer.
- Matt Lavelle, American trumpet, flugelhorn and bass clarinet player.
- Peter Martin, American pianist.
- Tom Brantley, American trombonist.

== See also ==
- 1970s in jazz
- List of years in jazz
- 1970 in music
