= 1909 in jazz =

- Decade: Pre-1920 in jazz
- Music: 1909 in music
- Standards: List of pre-1920 jazz standards
- See also: 1908 in jazz – 1910 in jazz

This is a timeline documenting events of jazz in the year 1909.

== Events ==
- Tenor saxophonist Coleman Hawkins started playing the piano at the age of five years.

== Births ==
January

- 13
  - Danny Barker, American guitarist, banjoist, vocalist, and author (died 1994).
  - Ed Burke, American violinist and trombonist (died 1988).
- 15 – Gene Krupa, American jazz and big band drummer, band leader, actor, and composer (died 1973).
- 22 – Mouse Randolph, American trumpeter (died 1997).
- 24 – Tiny Winters, English bassist and vocalist (died 1996).

February

- 4 – Artie Bernstein, American upright bassist (died 1964).
- 20 – Oscar Alemán, Argentine guitarist, singer, and dancer (died 1980).

March

- 2 – Narvin Kimball, American musician (died 2006).
- 3 – Booker Pittman, American clarinetist (died 1969).
- 9 – Herschel Evans, American tenor saxophonist (died 1939).
- 21 – Miff Görling, Swedish bandleader, trombonist, arranger, and composer (died 1988).
- 27 – Ben Webster, American tenor saxophonist (died 1973).

April

- 15 – Wilbert Baranco, American pianist and bandleader (died 1983).
- 16 – Pippo Starnazza, Italian singer and actor (died 1975).
- 29 – Jacques Butler, American trumpeter and vocalist (died 2003).

May

- 7 – Teddy Bunn, American guitarist, Spirits of Rhythm (died 1978).
- 29 – Dick Stabile, American saxophonist and bandleader (died 1980).
- 30 – Benny Goodman, American clarinetist and bandleader known as the "King of Swing" (died 1986).

June

- 8 – Henry Nemo, American musician, songwriter, and actor (died 1999).
- 13 – Garland Wilson, American pianist (died 1954).
- 27 – Leon Washington, American tenor saxophonist (died 1973).

July

- 16 – Teddy Buckner, American trumpeter (died 1994).
- 22 – Cassino Simpson, American pianist (died 1952).

August

- 8 – Rupert Cole, Trinidadian alto saxophonist and clarinetist (died unknown date).
- 10 – Claude Thornhill, American pianist, arranger, composer, and bandleader (died 1965).
- 14 – Stuff Smith, American violinist (died 1967).
- 17 – Larry Clinton, American bandleader and songwriter (died 1985).
- 27 – Lester Young, American tenor saxophonist, clarinetist, composer, and bandleader (died 1959).

September

- 26 – Gus Deloof, Belgian trumpeter, composer, and arranger (died 1974).

October

- 4 – Buddy Featherstonhaugh, English saxophonist (died 1976).
- 13
  - Art Tatum, American pianist (died 1956).
  - Scoville Browne, American reedist (died 1994).
- 17 – Cozy Cole, American drummer (died 1981).

December

- 12 – Eddie Barefield, American saxophonist, clarinetist, and arranger (died 1991).
- 17 – Roy McCloud, American cornetist (died 1986).
- 31 – Jonah Jones, American trumpeter sometimes referred to as "King Louis II" (died 2000).

Unknown date

- Roger Chaput, French guitarist and visual artist, Quintette du Hot Club de France (died 1995).
- Rudy Williams, American jazz alto saxophonist (died 1954).
- Tiny Davis, American trumpeter and vocalist (died 1994).
