= 1906 in jazz =

- Decade: Pre-1920 in jazz
- Music: 1906 in music
- Standards: List of pre-1920 jazz standards
- See also: 1905 in jazz – 1907 in jazz

This is a timeline documenting events of jazz in the year 1906.

== Events ==
- Duke Ellington starts playing the piano at the age of seven.

== Births ==
January

- 4 – Frankie Newton, American trumpeter (died 1954).
- 6 – Bobby Stark, American trumpeter (died 1945).

March

- 3 – Barney Bigard, American clarinetist (died 1980).
- 13 – Frank Teschemacher, American clarinetist and alt saxophonist (died 1932).
- 27 – Pee Wee Russell, American clarinet and saxophones (died 1969).

April

- 3
  - Billy Taylor, American upright bassist (died 1986).
  - Fats Pichon, American pianist, singer, bandleader, and songwriter (died 1967).
- 10
  - Fud Livingston, American jazz clarinetist, saxophonist, arranger, and composer (died 1957).
  - Kai Ewans, Danish reedist (died 1988).
- 18 – Little Brother Montgomery, American pianist and singer (died 1985).
- 22 – Alex Hill, American pianist (died 1937).
- 29 – Ward Pinkett, American trumpeter (died 1937).
- 30 – Hayes Pillars, American tenor saxophonist and bandleader (died 1992).

May

- 7 – Edward Inge, American arranger and reedist (died 1988).

June

- 7 – Glen Gray, American saxophonist and band leader, Casa Loma Orchestra (died 1963).
- 13 – Edwin Swayze, American trumpeter and composer (died 1935).
- 18 – Ray Bauduc, American drummer (died 1988).

July

- 9 – Joe Darensbourg, American clarinetist and saxophonist (died 1985).
- 25 – Johnny Hodges, American alto saxophonist (died 1970).

August

- 10 – Robert De Kers, Belgian trumpeter and bandleader (died 1987).
- 19 – Eddie Durham, American guitarist, trombonist, composer, and arranger (died 1987).

September

- 23 – Sterling Bose, American trumpeter and cornetist (died 1958).
- 25 – Jaroslav Ježek, Czech composer, pianist, and conductor (died 1942).

October

- 10 – Leo Mathisen, Danish pianist, composer, arranger, singer, and bandleader (died 1969).
- 15 – Victoria Spivey, American singer and songwriter (died 1976).

November

- 9 – Pete Brown, American alto saxophonist and bandleader (died 1963).
- 22 – Guy Kelly, American trumpeter (died 1940).

December

- 6 – Fulton McGrath, American pianist and songwriter (died 1958).
- 28 – René Compère, Belgian trumpeter (died 1969).

Unknown date

- Cuba Austin, American drummer (died 1961).
- Leon "Pee Wee" Whittaker, American Trombonist (died 1993).
