= 1907 in jazz =

- Decade: Pre-1920 in jazz
- Music: 1907 in music
- Standards: List of pre-1920 jazz standards
- See also: 1906 in jazz – 1908 in jazz

This is a timeline documenting events of Jazz in the year 1907.

== Events ==
June

- 5 – The New Orleans Blues trumpet pioneer Buddy Bolden runs amok and is committed to the state hospital at Angola. He spent the rest of his life there and was never recorded.

== Births ==
January

- 4 – Joe Marsala, Italian-American clarinetist and songwriter (died 1978).
- 31 – Benny Morton, American trombonist most associated with the swing genre (died 1985).

February

- 10 – Joe Haymes, American bandleader and arranger (died 1964).
- 22 – Rex Stewart, American cornetist, Duke Ellington Orchestra (died 1967).
- 26 – Harry Gold, British saxophonist and bandleader (died 2005).

March

- 1 – Albert Ammons, American pianist (died 1949).
- 7 – Olivia Plunket Greene, English musician, Bright Young Things (died 1958).
- 28 – Herb Hall, American clarinetist and saxophonist (died 1996).

April

- 15 – Casper Reardon, American harpist (died 1941).
- 26 – Dave Tough, American drummer (died 1948).

May

- 1 – Hayes Alvis, American upright bassist and tubist (died 1972).
- 17 – Castor McCord, American saxophonist (died 1963).
- 20 – Rod Cless, American clarinetist and saxophonist (died 1944).
- 30 – Fernando Arbello, Puerto Rican-American trombonist and composer (died 1970).

June

- 10 – Dicky Wells, American trombonist (died 1985).
- 14 – Sid Phillips, English clarinettist, bandleader, and arranger (died 1973).
- 17 – Gene Sedric, American clarinetist and tenor saxophonist (died 1963).
- 22 – Ernest "Doc" Paulin, American musician (died 2007).

July

- 28 – Leon Prima, American trumpeter (died 1985).
- 31 – Roy Milton, American singer, drummer, and bandleader (died 1983).

August

- 3 – Lawrence Brown, American trombonist (died 1988).
- 8 – Benny Carter, American jazz alto saxophonist, clarinetist, trumpeter, composer, arranger, and bandleader (died 2003).
- 13 – Skinnay Ennis, American bandleader and singer (died 1963).

September

- 4 – Jan Savitt, American bandleader, musical arranger, and violinist (died 1948).
- 23 – Tiny Bradshaw, American bandleader, singer, composer, pianist, and drummer (died 1958).

October

- 1 – Ryoichi Hattori, Japanese composer (died 1993).
- 19 – Roger Wolfe Kahn, American musician, composer, and bandleader (died 1962).
- 24 – André Ekyan, French reedist (died 1972).
- 26 – Tony Pastor, Italian-American novelty singer and tenor saxophonist (died 1969).

November

- 3 – Joe Turner, American pianist (died 1990).
- 10 – Jane Froman, American singer and actress (died 1980).
- 26 – Frank Melrose, American pianist (died 1941).

December

- 3 – Connee Boswell, American singer (died 1976).
- 6 – Fulton McGrath, American pianist and songwriter (died 1958).
- 20 – Al Rinker, American singer and composer (died 1982).
- 25 – Cab Calloway, American singer and bandleader (died 1994).

Unknown date

- Moses Allen, American upright bassist (died 1983).
- Snoozer Quinn, American guitarist (died 1949).
