= Dalia Faitelson =

Israeli composer, vocalist, guitarist, and DJ

Dalia Faitelson דליה פייטלסון
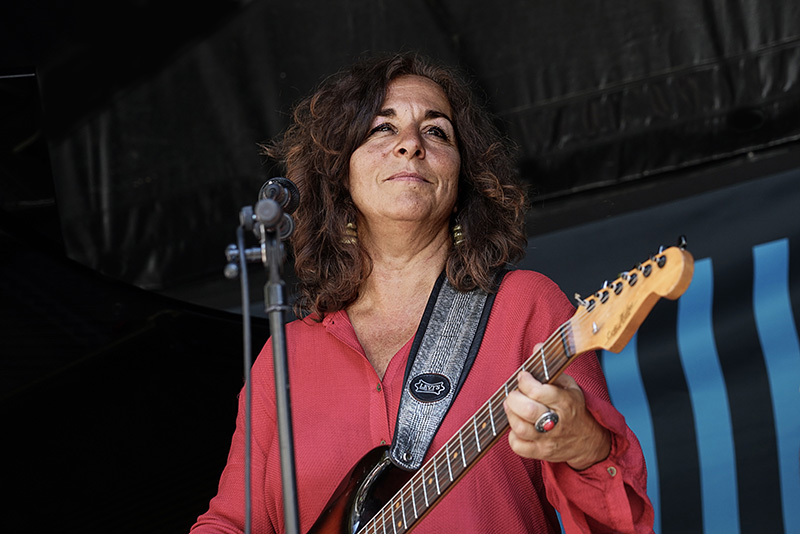
- Dalia Faitelson at Copenhagen Jazz Festival 2018

Background information
- Born: December 14, 1966 (age 58); Negev Desert, Israel
- Genres: Jazz
- Occupation: Musician
- Instrument: Guitar
- Labels: Enja, Sundance, Storyville, Double Moon, Peregrina Music, Losen, Gateway Music
- Website: daliafaitelson.com

Dalia Faitelson (Hebrew: דליה פייטלסון; born 14 December 1966) is a Denmark-based Israeli composer, vocalist, guitarist, and DJ DaFa.

== Biography ==
Faitelson is of Israeli descent. She studied at the Rubin Academy of Music and Dance in Jerusalem, followed by the Berklee College of Music in Boston, before she moved to Copenhagen, Denmark. Her music combines jazz, folk, Middle Eastern and Balkan melodies.

Faitelson worked with Randy Brecker, Jerry Bergonzi, Lelo Nika, Adam Nussbaum, Chris Cheek, Marilyn Mazur, Manolo Badrena, Thommy Andersson and Café. She received the Danish equivalent of a Grammy Award for Jazz in 2000 for the album Diamond of the Day and the 2005 Composer of the Year Award given by the Danish Composer Association. In 2014 she was nominated for Best Jazz Vocal Album at the Danish Music Awards for As the World Sleeps and has twice been nominated for the Danish World Music Award with her band Pilpel.

== Discography ==
- Common Ground (Storyville Records, 1994)
- On Rising Spirits (Stunt Records, 1997)
- Diamond of the Day (Stunt Records, 1999)
- Point of No Return (Stunt Records, 2001)
- Movable Clouds (Enja Records, 2004)
- Spring Alliance (Calibrated Music, 2007)
- Pilpel (Double Moon, 2007)
- The Orient West Choir (Gateway, 2011)
- Pilpel - Burning Sensation (Peregrina Music, 2011)
- As the World Sleeps (Tunecore, 2014)
- Powered by Life (Losen, 2018)
- Inner Sky Project (The Orchard, Dec. 2022)
