= Manuel Mota =

Manuel Mota may refer to:

- Manuel Mota (guitarist) (born 1970), jazz and blues guitarist
- Manuel Mota (fashion designer) (1966–2013), Spanish fashion designer
- Manny Mota (Manuel Rafael Mota Geronimo, born 1938), baseball player
