= Scoville Browne =

American jazz musician (1909–1994)

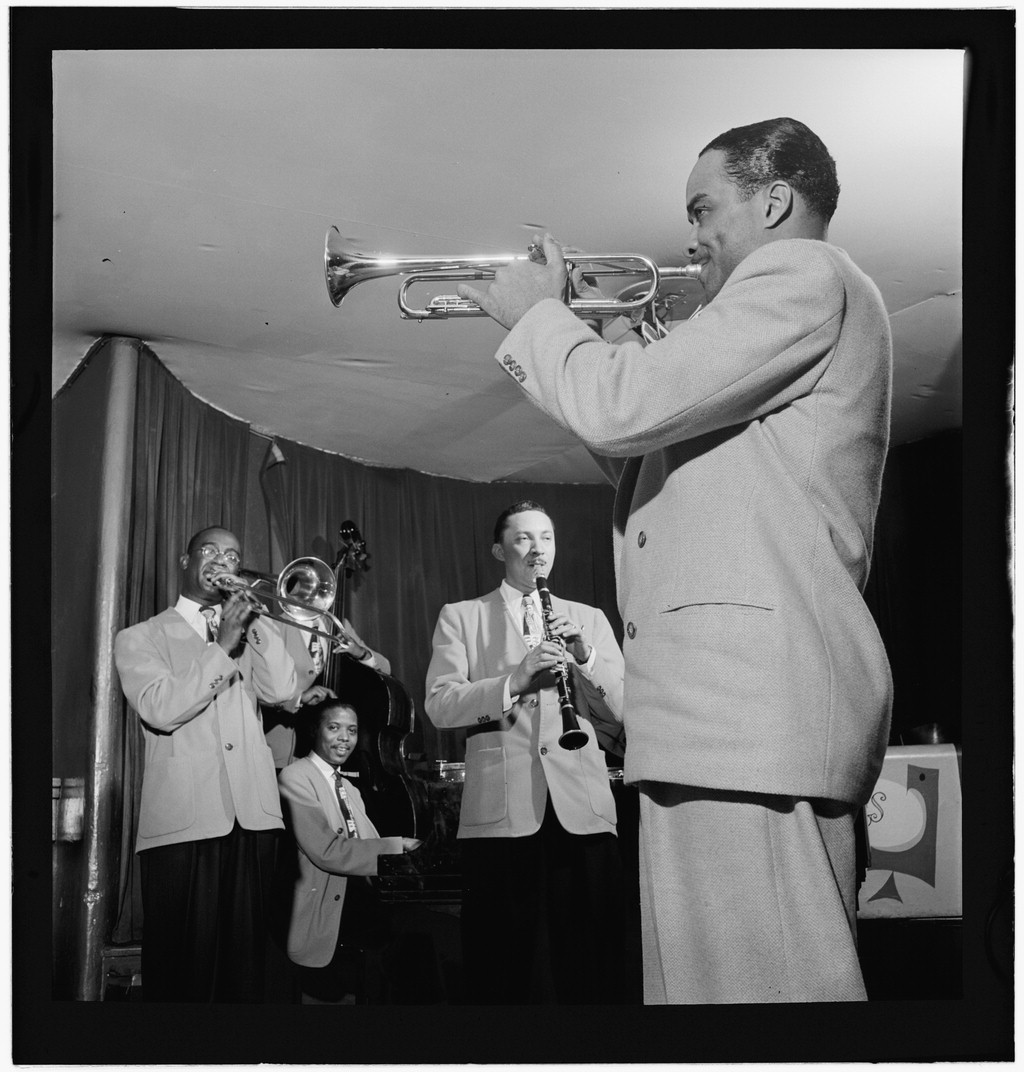
Buck Clayton with Ted Kelly, Kenny Kersey, Benny Fonville, Scoville Toby Browne, Cafe Society (Downtown), New York, N.Y., ca. June 1947 . Photograph by William P. Gottlieb.

Scoville "Toby" Browne (October 13, 1909, Atlanta – October 3, 1994) was an American jazz reedist.

Browne played in the late 1920s with Junie Cobb's band and the Midnight Ramblers in Chicago; in 1931–32 he played saxophone and clarinet for Fred Avendorph. He worked with Louis Armstrong from 1933 to 1935, and in the mid- and late 1930s with Jesse Stone, Jack Butler, Claude Hopkins, and Blanche Calloway. At the end of the decade he attended the Chicago College of Music. In the 1940s Browne played with Slim Gaillard, Fats Waller, Buddy Johnson, Hot Lips Page, and Eddie Heywood before serving in the U.S. military during World War II. Following his discharge he played with Hopkins again and with Buck Clayton.

Browne worked as a bandleader on and off in the 1950s, and also studied classical music. He played with Lionel Hampton and Muggsy Spanier late in the 1950s, and appears in the 1958 photograph A Great Day in Harlem. Browne continued to do work with Hopkins into the 1970s. He never recorded as a bandleader.
