= Trinity (Harold E. Smith, Mike Krull and Joe McPhee album) =

Live album by Joe McPhee, Harold E. Smith, Mike Krull
- Released: 1972
- Recorded: November 28, 1971 in the Parish Hall, West Park, New York
- Genre: Jazz
- Length: 55:50
- Label: CjR CjR 3 Atavistic ALP214CD

Joe McPhee chronology
At WBAI's Free Music Store, 1971 (1971)	Trinity (1972)	Pieces of Light (1974)

Trinity is a live album by American jazz composer and multi-instrumentalist Joe McPhee recorded in 1972 in West Park, New York and originally released on the CjR label, then reissued by Atavistic in 2001.

== Reception ==
Professional ratings
Review scores
Source	Rating
Allmusic	4/5 stars
The Penguin Guide to Jazz Recordings	3/4 stars

The Allmusic review by Thom Jurek stated "On Trinity, the listener travels the history of sound through time and space. All that's left to do is nod silently in affirmation or weep and gnash your teeth in defeat. Revelatory. Glorious". On All About Jazz writer Derek Taylor noted "McPhee states that Trinity was the first record where he really began to feel comfortable with his tenor playing. Drinking in his work on each of his horns over the duration of the album it’s startling how much of McPhee the mature player is already solidly in place and his explanation takes on new candor".

== Track listing ==
All compositions by Joe McPhee, Mike Krull and Harold E. Smith except as indicated

1. "Ionization" - 28:41
2. "Astral Spirits" (McPhee) - 10:42
3. "Delta" - 16:19

== Personnel ==
- Joe McPhee - tenor saxophone, soprano saxophone, trumpet, cornet
- Mike Kull - piano, electric piano
- Harold E. Smith - percussion
