= Black Magic Man =

Live album by Joe McPhee
- Released: 1975
- Recorded: December 12 and 13, 1970 at Chicago Hall at Vassar College Urban Center for Black Studies
- Genre: Jazz
- Length: 35:03
- Label: HatHut hat HUT A
- Producer: CjR

Joe McPhee chronology
Nation Time (1971)	Black Magic Man (1975)	At WBAI's Free Music Store, 1971 (1971)

Alternative Cover

Black Magic Man is a live album by multi-instrumentalist and composer Joe McPhee recorded on December 12, 1970 (at the same concerts chronicled on his previous album, Nation Time). This was the very first release on the Swiss jazz label HatHut in 1975. It was later included (in heavily extended form) on the "Nation Time" 4-CD boxed set issued by the music label of Chicago arts collective "Corbett vs. Dempsey" in 2013.

== Reception ==
Professional ratings
Review scores
Source	Rating
Allmusic	3.5/5 stars

The Allmusic review by Brian Olewnick states "Black Magic Man evinces a McPhee coming very much out of the ecstatic free jazz of the time (especially the late John Coltrane and Albert Ayler) but also wrestling with the implications of rock and the use of electronic instruments in jazz".

== Track listing ==
All compositions by Joe McPhee

1. "Black Magic Man" - 9:30
2. "Song for Laureen" - 9:25
3. "Hymn of the Dragon Kings" - 17:10

== Personnel ==
- Joe McPhee - tenor saxophone, soprano saxophone
- Mike Kull - piano, electric piano
- Tyrone Crabb - bass, electric bass
- Bruce Thompson, Ernest Bostic - percussion
