= 1913 in jazz =

- Decade: 1910s in jazz
- Music: 1913 in music
- Standards: List of pre-1920 jazz standards
- See also: 1912 in jazz – 1914 in jazz

This is a timeline documenting events of Jazz in the year 1913.

== Events ==
- The word "jazz" first appears in print.
- James Reese Europe records ragtime arrangements in New York with the first black ensemble to be recorded.

== Births ==
January

- 17 – Vido Musso, Italian-American tenor saxophonist, clarinetist, and bandleader (died 1982).
- 27 – Milton Adolphus, American pianist and composer (died 1998).

February

- 5 – Rozelle Claxton, American pianist (died 1995).
- 22 – Buddy Tate, American saxophonist and clarinetist (died 2001).

March

- 1 – Ralph Ellison, American novelist and literary critic (died 1994).
- 31 – Etta Baker, American guitarist and singer (died 2006).

April

- 4
  - Gene Ramey, American upright bassist (died 1984).
  - Muddy Waters, American blues guitarist and singer-songwriter (died 1983).
- 25 – Earl Bostic, American alto saxophonist (died 1965).
- 29 – Jack Bentley, English trombonist, journalist, and scriptwriter (died 1994).

May

- 16 – Woody Herman, American clarinetist, saxophonist, singer, and big band leader (died 1987).

June

- 14 – Stanley Black, English bandleader, composer, conductor, arranger and pianist (died 2002).
- 20 – Alfred Gallodoro, American musician (died 2008).
- 23 – Helen Humes, American singer (died 1981).
- 25 – Adele Girard, American harpist (died 1993).

July

- 5 – Smiley Lewis, American singer and guitarist (died 1966).
- 18 – Nat Temple, British big band leader (died 2008).

August

- 7 – George Van Eps, American guitarist (died 1998).
- 13 – Anna Mae Winburn, African-American vocalist and bandleader (died 1999).
- 23 – Bob Crosby, American singer and bandleader (died 1993).

September

- 10 – Cliff Leeman, American drummer (died 1986).
- 19 – Helen Ward, American singer (died 1998).
- 20 – John Collins, American guitarist (died 2001).
- 24 – Herb Jeffries, African-American actor and singer-songwriter (died 2014).
- 26 – Dorothy Sloop, American pianist (died 1998).

October

- 1 – Harry Lookofsky, American violinist (died 1998).
- 2 – Wally Rose, American pianist (died 1997).
- 15 – Thore Jederby, Swedish upright bassist, record producer, and radio broadcaster (died 1984).
- 19 – Vinicius de Moraes, Brazilian singer, poet, lyricist, essayist, and playwright (died 1980).
- 21
  - Cosimo Di Ceglie, Italian guitarist (died 1980).
  - Gus Clark, Belgian pianist (died 1979).
- 26 – Charlie Barnet, American saxophonist, composer, and bandleader (died 1991).
- 27 – Boyd Raeburn, American bandleader and bass saxophonist (heart attack) (died 1966).

November

- 13
  - Singleton Palmer, American bassist, cornetist, tubist, and bandleader (died 1993).
  - Blue Lu Barker, American singer (died 1998).
- 15 – Gus Johnson, American drummer (died 2000).
- 19 – Blue Barron, American orchestra leader (died 2005).

December

- 7 – Blind John Davis, African-American, blues, jazz and boogie-woogie pianist and singer (died 1985).
- 10
  - Pannonica de Koenigswarter, British-born jazz patron and writer (died 1988).
  - Ray Nance, American trumpeter, violinist and singer (died 1976).
- 12 – Don Stovall, American alto saxophonist (died 1970).
- 14 – Ted Buckner, American saxophonist (died 1976).
- 25 – Candy Candido, American bassist and vocalist (died 1999).
