= Daniel Tinte =

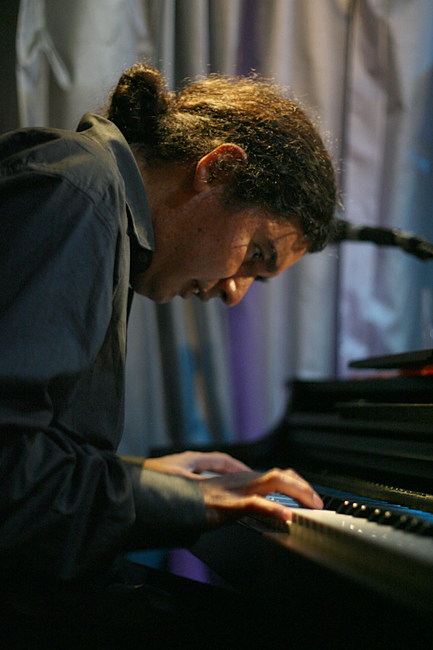

Background information
- Born: Daniel Fernando Tinte; 6 December 1969 (age 56); Salta, Argentina
- Genres: Calchaquismo, Argentinean folk jazz
- Occupation: Musician
- Instruments: Piano, keyboards
- Years active: 1995–present
- Label: PAI
- Website: danieltinte.com

Daniel Tinte (born 6 December 1969) is a pianist from Argentina.

Tinte is part of the musical movement known as The Calchaquismo, characterized by the fusion of Argentine folk dance with the improvisation of contemporary jazz and rock music, which was founded in 1998. Andean rhythms and dances such as the comparsa salteña, the carnavalito, pim pin, bailecito, zamba salteña, kaluyo, vidala, and huayno are drawn upon with new compositions, arrangements and instrumentation. The name "calchaquismo" was inspired by the airs and melodies from the Calchaqui Valley, Lerma Valley and Quebrada de Humahuaca in the Argentine provinces of Salta and Jujuy.

== Biography ==
Tinte's love of music was inherited from his grandfather, Jose María Tinte, a native of Fuerte Quemado, (Catamarca). Tinte studied piano for eight years and began to play popular music in his first rock band at the age of 13. Living in the south of the city of Salta, he belonged to "Inter Consummation" (1986–87) and "The Time Machine" (1988–91).

He studied at the School of Music of the Province of Salta, where he has taught keyboard since 1994. In that year, he met guitarist Oscar Echazú, who invited him to join a jazz quartet. At the beginning of the 90 ' in the group "The Tune" began to fuse northern Argentine folklore with contemporary jazz improvisation. He met bassist Oscar Salinas and formed the jazz fusion group "The Region" (1995–2000).

In 2000 Tinte formed the group "The Street", playing modern jazz composed by Miles Davis, Herbie Hancock, and Bill Evans, among others. He was a pianist in solo projects, as were those recognized Argentine Folklorists Patricio Jimenez of Duo Salteño, Enrique "Chichi" Ibarra, and Zamba Quipildor. The following year, he joined friends from the School of Music in creating "Ensemble Calchaqui." His compositions began to show the influence of Andean folk music, jazz, and rock. He finally recorded his first CD, Northwest Piano, with twenty musicians from Salta, Jujuy, and Tucumán in January 2003. Later discs included Dance of the Valleys (2004), with the participation of "Teuco New Generation", "The Tonkas" and "Civilization Huayra Callpa".

Saltalogia (2005) celebrated in music nine major areas of Salta, giving each its rhythmic imprint. Variations of the Puna was recorded in Buenos Aires in 2006 with the participation of musicians from the Symphony Orchestra of Salta. The discs Jazz Calchaqui (2007), Incafonismo (2008), Live in Salta (2009), and Vinilograma (2010) involved first-class Argentine jazz musicians. All of these discs were released by a major Argentine music label.

In 2009 he forms Incayavi Aymara Rock Band, crossing rock, jazz and Andean folklore with original poems from the Argentine Northwest.

From 2010 onwards, he produces his own electronic music albums in fusion with Argentine and Bolivian folklore, without forgetting the Calchaquí Jazz, rock and chamber music.

Having produced by 2017 already more than 50 albums in his name, including solo and live piano records.

== Calchaquismo ==
Calchaquismo is a musical movement created by the pianist in 1998. The main characteristics start from the encounter of Argentine folk dances with the improvisation of contemporary jazz and rock music. Danzas and Andean rhythms such as comparsa salteña, carnavalito, pim pin, bailecito, la zamba salteña, kaluyo, la vidala and huayno are approached with new compositions, arrangements and instrumentation. It takes the name of "calchaquismo" inspired by the airs and melodies of the Valles Calchaquíes, Valle de Lerma and the Quebrada de Humahuaca in the Argentine provinces of Salta and Jujuy. At the second half of the 20th century, the approach of jazz with world folklores and cultures had its maximum popularity in countries like Brazil and Cuba in Latin jazz; not being the exception in this case for the Andean dances and music of Argentina and Bolivia, main characteristic of the music of the calchaquismo.

== Discography ==
- 2003 Northwest Piano
- 2004 Dance of the Valleys
- 2005 Saltalogía
- 2006 Variations of the Puna
- 2007 Jazz Calchaqui
- 2008 Incafonismo
- 2009 Live in Salta
- 2010 Vinilograma
- 2010 Comparsero
- 2011 El Gran Tucma
- 2011 El Gran Tucma Vol 2
- 2011 El Soléo
- 2011 El Gran Tucma Vol 3
- 2012 Doce Teclas Originarias
- 2012 Doce Teclas Originarias Vol 2
- 2012 Invenciones Populares
- 2012 Purmamarca Jazz
- 2013 The Groove of the Caciques
- 2013 Piano Concertos Calchaquistas
- 2013 Improvisaciones Del Intiraymi
- 2014 Wankar Blues: Live at Salta Jazz Festival 2013
- 2014 The Harmony of Silence
- 2014 Twelve Original Keys Vol 3
- 2014 8 Sonnets Calchaquíes for Piano
- 2014 Quisquiri
- 2014 Pucaraciones
- 2014 Pucaraciones Vol 2
- 2014 Jazzometer
- 2014 Jazzmen Calchaquí
- 2014 Jazzmen Calchaquí Vol 2
- 2014 35 Pianazos Diaguitas
- 2014 Improvisaciones Del Huaytiquina
- 2015 Ruta 40
- 2015 Punagroove
- 2015 Omaguacas Del Sol
- 2015 Tintetizer
- 2016 Wiphálico
- 2016 Mayuko
- 2016 Electric Joi Joi
- 2016 Baritú
- 2016 Calchaquisuyu
- 2016 Improvisaciones Salteñas Para Piano
- 2016 Calchaquismo Sound
