= At WBAI's Free Music Store, 1971 =

Live album by Joe McPhee & Survival Unit II
- Released: 1999
- Recorded: October 27, 1968, at WBAI's Free Music Store in NYC
- Genre: Jazz
- Length: 80:52
- Label: HatHut hat ART CD 6197
- Producer: Pia and Werner X. Uehlinger

Joe McPhee chronology
Black Magic Man (1972)	At WBAI's Free Music Store, 1971 (1999)	Trinity (1971)

Alternative Cover

At WBAI's Free Music Store, 1971 (also released as N.Y.N.Y. 1971) is a live album by multi-instrumentalist and composer Joe McPhee recorded in 1971 for WBAI (99.5 FM) in New York City, and first issued by the Swedish HatHut label in 1996.

== Reception ==
Professional ratings
Review scores
Source	Rating
Allmusic	4/5 stars
All About Jazz	5/5 stars

The Allmusic review by Scott Yanow states "The six lengthy pieces (which are sandwiched by somewhat stilted announcing) are full of fire but also have their quiet and lyrical moments. A strong all-around performance that should not have taken 26 years to release". On All About Jazz, Nic Jones noted "this is a great opportunity to check in with McPhee on street level and follow his musical journey chronologically from there. Live a little and savour the challenge".

== Track listing ==
All compositions by Joe McPhee

1. Announcement 1 - 0:34
2. "Black Magic Man" - 6:22
3. Announcement 2 - 0:35
4. "Nation Time" - 14:12
5. "Song for Lauren" - 13:17
6. Announcement 3 - 0:33
7. "Message from Denmark" - 12:40
8. "The Looking Glass 1" - 18:01
9. "Harriet" - 13:35

== Personnel ==
- Joe McPhee - tenor saxophone, trumpet
- Clifford Thornton - baritone horn, cornet
- Byron Morris - alto saxophone, soprano saxophone
- Mike Kull - piano
- Harold E. Smith - percussion
