= Juliet Kelly =

British jazz singer and songwriter

Juliet Kelly is a British jazz singer and songwriter.

== Biography ==
Kelly grew up in London and discovered her talent for singing whilst studying economics at university. Mentored by Anita Wardell she then went on to attend the postgraduate jazz course at the Guildhall School of Music and Drama.

Her debut album, Aphrodite's Child received critical acclaim in the UK and the US. This led to her touring the UK and appearing on BBC Television's Jazz Britannia concert broadcast live from the Barbican in London in 2005. Her second album Delicious Chemistry was also well received and included appearances from several well-known jazz musicians including Courtney Pine, Sebastian Rochford, Roger Beaujolais and Byron Wallen. Kelly's third album Licorice Kiss was released in 2009.

In 2015 Kelly released her fourth album "Spellbound Stories"; a set of songs inspired by her favourite novels.

== Discography ==
=== Leader ===
- 2003: Aphrodite's Child (33 Jazz)
- 2005: Delicious Chemistry (Chantiko)
- 2009: Licorice Kiss (Purple Stiletto)
- 2015: Spellbound Stories (Purple Stiletto)

=== Featured vocalist ===
- 2005: Courtney Pine Resistance
- 2011: Dimitri Vassilakis Across the Universe
