= Underground Railroad (album) =

Live album by Joe McPhee
- Released: 1969
- Recorded: October 13, 1968 and April 13, 1969
- Venue: Holy Cross Monastery, West Park, New York
- Genre: Free jazz
- Length: 43:55 (original release); 147:36 (2CD reissue)
- Label: CjR CjR 1 Atavistic ALP226CD

Joe McPhee chronology
Underground Railroad (1969)	Nation Time (1971)

Underground Railroad is a live album by composer and saxophonist Joe McPhee recorded in 1969 at Holy Cross Monastery and originally released on the CjR label. It was reissued in 2001 by Atavistic with an additional concert recorded at Holy Cross.

== Reception ==
Professional ratings
Review scores
Source	Rating
Allmusic	4.5/5 stars
The Penguin Guide to Jazz Recordings	3/4 stars

The Allmusic review by Thom Jurek stated "There are conical sound explorations between brass and reed and between reed and reed. Tonal variants are evoked in order to up the emotional content of the music, which is already so loaded it's a miracle it doesn't fall apart... This set is one of the most essential recordings of late-'60s free jazz, and anybody remotely interested in the period needs to hear it". On All About Jazz, Robert Spencer noted "this set shows conclusively that McPhee’s massive talent was at his disposal from the onset of his earliest efforts. Any fan of ecstatic free jazz shouldn’t pass this one up!".

== Track listing ==
All compositions by Joe McPhee except as indicated

Disc One:

1. "Underground Railroad" - 22:49
2. "Harriet" - 11:11
3. "Message From Denmark" - 9:55
4. "New Spiritual No. 1" - 14:23 Bonus track on CD reissue
5. "E=MC2" (Reggy Marks) - 9:52 Bonus track on CD reissue

Disc Two:

1. "Justice (Evidence)" (Thelonious Monk) - 8:19 Bonus track on CD reissue
2. "Windy City Head Stompin' Blues" - 12:29 Bonus track on CD reissue
3. "Birmingham Sunday/Morning Song/Lament/Hymn of the Dragon Kings" - 25:41 Bonus track on CD reissue
4. "Spain Adios" (Marks) - 12:57 Bonus track on CD reissue

== Personnel ==
- Joe McPhee - tenor saxophone, pocket trumpet, trumpet, alto horn
- Reggie Marks [died in 2024] - tenor saxophone, soprano saxophone, flute
- Otis Greene [died in 2015] - alto saxophone, harmonica (Disc Two)
- Joe Virgillio [died in 2018] - tenor saxophone, soprano saxophone (Disc Two)
- Tyrone Crabb [died in 1999] - bass
- Ernest Bostic [died in 1992] - drums, vibraphone, percussion
