= Justin Hayford =

American singer

- Born: Justin Hayford; March 11, 1970 (age 56)
- Origin: Rochester, New York, United States
- Genres: Vocal jazz Cabaret
- Occupations: Jazz singer Pianist; Social activist Journalist
- Instruments: Vocals piano

Justin Hayford (born March 11, 1970) is a Chicago-based singer and pianist. He performs jazz and cabaret music and specializes in reviving obscure and forgotten songs from the past. Justin writes and presents cabaret shows at various venues in Chicago, and has released a number of albums.

He also worked as Case Manager of the Legal Council for Health Justice from 1991 through at least 2017, and wrote theater reviews for the Chicago Reader newspaper from 1987 until 2019.

== Music ==
Justin has recorded at least four albums for Lee Lessack's LML Music label, which was dedicated to cabaret, jazz and Broadway music. All four albums are collections of little-known old songs.

- A Rare Find: Forgotten Gems from the American Popular Songbook. Released 2001. After performing for three years at various Chicago venues, Justin decided to put together some of his favorite songs, and so his debut album appeared. It contains songs mostly from the 1930s and 1940s by famous songwriters such as Harold Arlen, Frank Loesser ("I Go For That"), Burke and Van Heusen ("Humpty Dumpty Heart"), Comden and Green ("You’re Awful"), Steve Allen ("Kiss Me with a Smile"), Hugh Martin ("I’m Not So Bright"), Joseph Meyer ("According to the Moonlight").
- Look Who's Been Dreaming: Neglected Treasures from Hollywood's Golden Age. Released 2004. This album is a collection of songs from old Hollywood movies: "Please Pardon Us, We’re in Love" (from You Can’t Have Everything), "Us on a Bus" (from Summer Wives), "Baby Mine" (from Dumbo), "Look Who's Been Dreaming" (from The Farmer Takes a Wife), "Never Swat a Fly" (from Just Imagine).
- It All Belongs to You: Unsung Cole Porter. Released 2007. This album comprises songs by the renowned American composer and songwriter Cole Porter.
- Here I'll Stay. Released 2012, via Bandcamp.

For these albums, Justin worked with the bassist Jim Cox and the drummer Phil Gratteau, and sometimes with additional musicians.

=== Awards and recognition ===
In 2001 After Dark Chicago Magazine gave Justin its "Outstanding Cabaret Artist" Award.

His easygoing style harkens back to the days when they used to call men such as him crooners, and his wry sense of humor and laid-back manner instantly set an audience at ease. Then he lets his nimble fingers traipse over the ivories, and it all adds up to rare and grand entertainment.

— 2001 After Dark Award
