= Francesco Buzzurro =

Italian guitarist

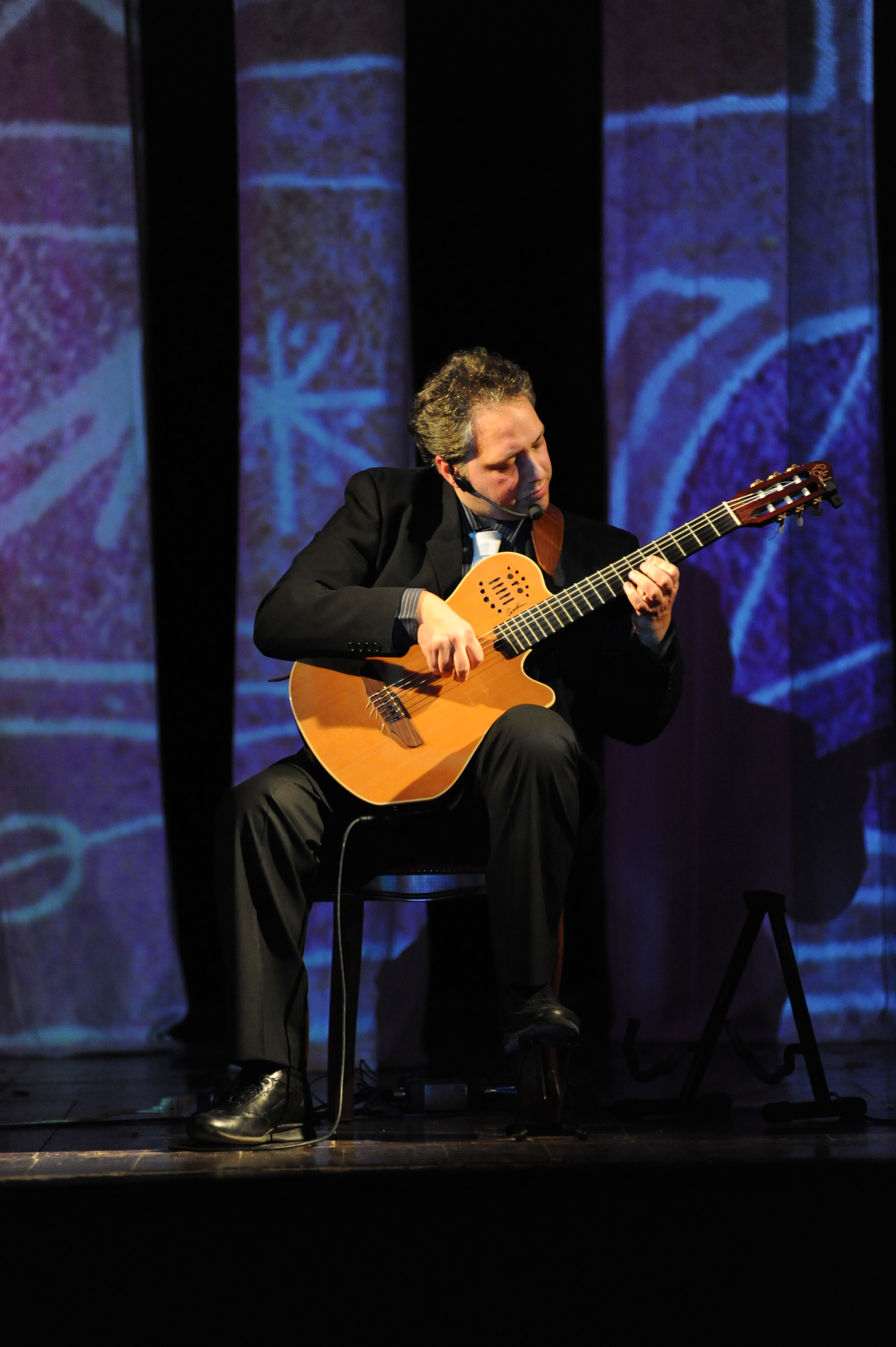

Background information
- Born: July 10, 1969 (age 57)
- Origin: Taormina, Italy
- Genre: Bossa nova
- Occupations: Guitarist, composer
- Instrument: guitar
- Years active: 1974–present

Francesco Buzzurro (born October 7, 1969, in Taormina, Italy) is an Italian guitarist.

== Biography ==
Buzzurro began studying classical guitar at the age of six. He earned a diploma from the Bellini Conservatory in Palermo, and later obtained a Master of Advanced Music from the International Arts Academy in Rome. There he was taught by musicians such as Stefano Palamidessi, David Russell, Alberto Ponce, Hopkinson Smith, and John Duarte.

== Career ==
He writes music for theater and television and appears on radio and television programs.

Indiana Productions, owners of Muccino-Brothers, chose the music of Buzzurro for the film Io ricordo.

- 2010: Received a prize from Italian President Giorgio Napolitano for the music in the docufilm Io ricordo
- 2009: Triquetra, from the Region of Sicily
- 2009: Groove Master Award prize a Francesco Buzzurro, perché "nell'ambito del groove e del contemporary jazz è riuscito ad offrire una nuova visione musicale, completata da una tecnica unica al mondo".
- 2008: Efebo D'Oro prize for the music in the film Io ricordo.

== Discography ==
Francesco Buzzurro Quartet
Francesco Buzzurro: guitar; Mauro Schiavone: piano & keyboards; Riccardo Lo Bue: basso; Sebastiano Alioto:batteria

- 1998 – Latinus (Teatro del Sole)
- 2006 – Naxos (Mare Nostrum)

Francesco Buzzurro solo guitar

- 2002 – Freely (Teatro del Sole)
- 2009 – L'Esploratore (Lo Faro/Irma Records-Edel)
