= Victoria Hart =

English jazz-pop singer (born 1988)

- Born: 25 November 1988 (age 37); California, U.S.
- Genres: Vocal jazz, pop
- Occupation: Singer
- Years active: 2006–present
- Label: Decca

Victoria Hart (born 25 November 1988) is a California-born English jazz-pop singer.

== Career ==
=== Early years ===
Hart studied vocals at London music school Vocaltech (Part of Tech Music Schools). She attended an International School in Mougins and finished her GCSEs in the summer of 2004. Having finished school and exams for the summer, she sang jazz to friends and family.

At age 15, while living with her parents in France, she was heard singing at a party in a vineyard by producer Geoff Gurd, who was so impressed he took her under his wing and began recording her.

Shortly afterward Hart recorded for the first time at Gurd's recording studio. Gurd has written several songs specifically for Hart. Hart, Gurd and Lynne Pearson formed a team of singer, writer/producer and manager who, together with a promotional team, developed Hart's debut album released in June 2007.

In May 2006 she performed at the Cannes Film Festival, Alex Proud heard Hart perform at the Pangea Club and later invited her to sing at the opening night of his new bar and gallery in London, At Proud. The audience included journalists and club owners and from this she was asked to perform at The Pigalle Club, in Piccadilly in London. Hart supported the Blue Harlem group.

In 2007, while working as a singing waitress at the Naked Turtle restaurant in London, the 18-year-old Hart was invited to perform for a benefit party during the Cannes Film Festival hosted by George Clooney and other stars, including Brad Pitt. The story was a press sensation and not soon after Hart had signed a purportedly $1m contract with Decca Records. This led to the "singing waitress" nickname.

Her debut album Whatever Happened to Romance was released on 30 June 2007 and peaked at the number 22 position on the Billboard Top Jazz Album list. On 27 October 2008 she released The Lost Gershwin, an album of lesser-known songs by George Gershwin. The string quartet Pavao provides backup.

=== Touring and live appearances ===
In July 2007, Hart performed at the three-day jazz festival at Woburn.

On 1 June 2008, Hart performed at the Southport International Jazz Festival.

During June and July 2008, Hart appeared as the special guest of tenor Russell Watson on his United Kingdom tour. She performed two songs solo and one duet with Watson.

She also performed live on The Today Show on 5 July 2008.

In December 2008, Hart made an impromptu guest appearance with the Guards Big Band at a Super Busking gig in London's Covent Garden as part of Covent Garden's Christmas Delight celebrations. The performance took place in-sync with a visual light display by United Visual Artists in aid of homeless charity Crisis.

In 2009, Hart performed before British troops in Afghanistan.

In February 2010, Hart appeared at the King's Head Theatre, Islington, as a guest artist in Taboo-Be-Do! Hits and Misses from the Politically Incorrect Songbook, a show compiled and performed by Terence Blacker and Derek Hewitson of the duo Something Happened. The show was performed at festivals, including the Hay Festival, and the Aldeburgh Literary Festival.

== Musical style ==
Her style has been described as a "renaissance of all things kitsch and fabulously forties", while Decca music mogul Mark Cavell hailed her as, "the Lily Allen of Jazz and if she's good enough for George and Brad she's good enough for Decca." Her musical hero is Ella Fitzgerald.

== Discography ==
- Whatever Happened to Romance? (Decca, 2007)
- The Lost Gershwin (2008)
