= Carolyn Breuer =

German jazz saxophonist

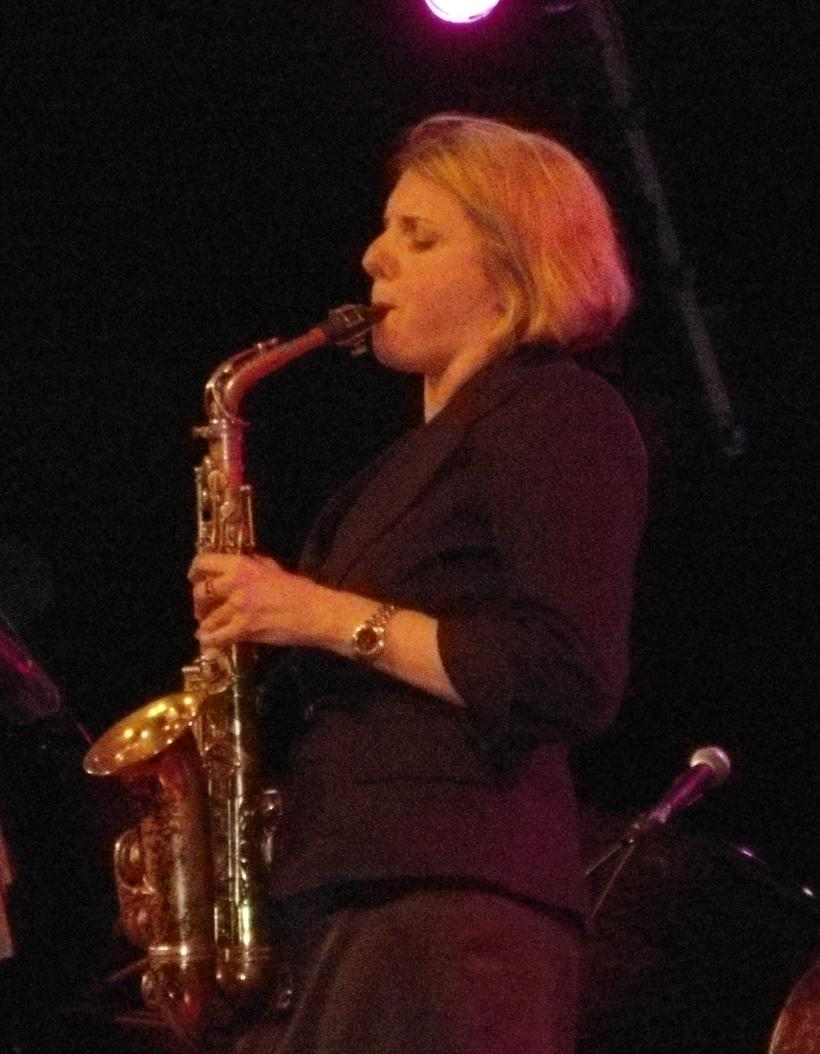
- Carolyn Breuer on stage

Background information
- Born: July 4, 1969 (age 55); Munich, Bavaria, Germany
- Genres: Jazz
- Occupation: Musician
- Instrument: Saxophone
- Years active: 1992–present
- Labels: NotNowMom!, Sony BMG
- Website: carolynbreuer.com

Carolyn Breuer (born 4 July 1969) is a German jazz saxophonist (alto and soprano).

She is the daughter of jazz musician Hermann Breuer. Breuer founded her own label, NotNowMom! Records, in 2000.

== Discography ==
- A Family Affair with Hermann Breuer (Enja, 1993)
- Simply Be with Fee Classen (Challenge, 1995)
- Acquaintance (A Records, 1997)
- Fate Smiles On Those Who Stay Cool (NotNowMom!, 2000)
- Night Moves (NotNowMom!, 2002)
- Serenade (BMG-Ariola, 2003)
- Home with Hermann Breuer (NotNowMom!, 2004)
- Amour Fou (NotNowMom!, 2005)
- Four Seasons of Life (NotNowMom!, 2013)
- Shoot the Piano Player! (NotNowMom!, 2015)
