= Nitcho Reinhardt =

French Gypsy jazz guitarist and composer (born 1988)

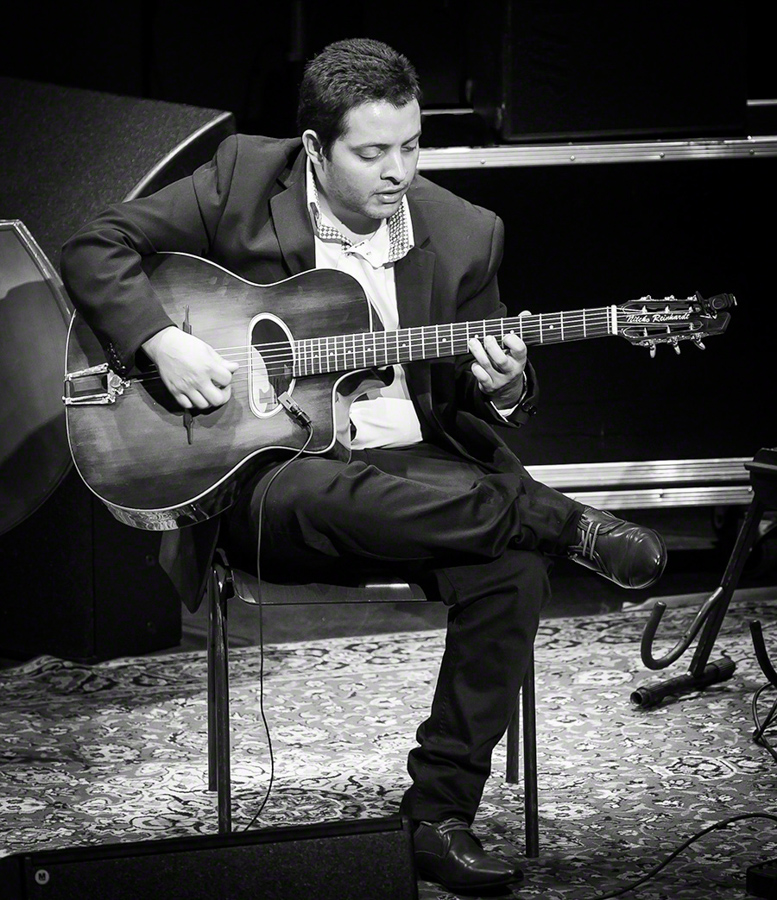
- Nitcho Reinhardt 2019 at Cosmopolite, Oslo.

Background information
- Born: 22 April 1988 (age 37); Verdun, France
- Origin: France
- Genres: Jazz
- Occupations: Musician, composer
- Instruments: Guitar, vokals
- Website: www.nitchoreinhardt.com

Nitcho Reinhardt (born 22 April 1988 in Verdun, France) is a French-Gypsy jazz guitarist and composer.

== Biography ==
Living in Verdun, Reinhardt picked up the guitar at 15 years of age. He released his debut album Latcho Dives in 2008 and in 2011 the album Une Histoire with his brothers Tony and Youri Reinhardt on rhythm guitar in addition to bassist Thierry Chanteloup. With his own Nitcho Reinhardt Trio including with Thierry Chanteloup and Benji Winterstein, he released the album Geronimo in 2018.

== Discography ==
- 2008: Latcho Dives
- 2011: Une Histoire
- 2018: Geronimo
