= Nation Time =

Live album by Joe McPhee
- Released: 1971
- Recorded: December 12 and 13, 1970 at Chicago Hall at Vassar College Urban Center for Black Studies
- Genre: Free jazz
- Length: 40:49
- Label: CjR CjR 2 Atavistic ALP201CD

Joe McPhee chronology
Underground Railroad (1969)	Nation Time (1971)	Black Magic Man (1971)

Nation Time is a live album by composer and saxophonist Joe McPhee recorded in late 1970 at Vassar College in New York, and released on the CjR label. It was reissued in 2000 by Atavistic.

== Reception ==
Professional ratings
Review scores
Source	Rating
Allmusic	4/5 stars
The Penguin Guide to Jazz Recordings	3/4 stars

The Allmusic review by Lang Thompson stated "the end result is inventive and captivating". On All About Jazz, Robert Spencer noted "one of the most exciting things about this album is the sense of space. Although all three of these tracks are quite propulsive, McPhee and his men are imaginative enough to continue to refresh them with rhythmic and other variations". PopMatters writer Imre Szeman said "Nation Time is as a good a place as any to start a sustained relationship with this genius of modern jazz. It’s the kind of album that you want to tell everyone about and that you want to force everyone to listen to. Brilliant stuff-an absolutely, positively recommended addition to your collection".

== Track listing ==
All compositions by Joe McPhee except as indicated

1. "Nation Time" - 18:31
2. "Shakey Jake" - 13:36
3. "Scorpio's Dance" (Joe McPhee, Mike Kull, Tyrone Crabb, Bruce Thompson, Ernest Bostic) - 8:42

== Personnel ==
- Joe McPhee - tenor saxophone, trumpet
- Otis Greene - alto saxophone (track 2)
- Mike Kull - piano, electric piano
- Herbie Lehman - organ (track 2)
- Dave Jones - guitar (track 2)
- Tyrone Crabb - bass, electric bass, trumpet
- Bruce Thompson, Ernest Bostic - percussion
