= Ayako Shirasaki =

Japanese-American jazz pianist (1969–2021)

- Born: 16 September 1969; Tokyo, Japan
- Died: 29 November 2021 (aged 52) New York City, U.S.
- Genres: Jazz, mainstream jazz, swing
- Occupations: Musician, composer
- Instrument: Piano
- Years active: 1990–2021
- Labels: What's New, Jan Matthies
- Website: ayakoshirasaki.com

Ayako Shirasaki (白崎 彩子, Shirasaki Ayako; 16 September 1969 – 29 November 2021) was a Japanese-American jazz pianist, composer and teacher living in Brooklyn, New York.

== Biography ==
Shirasaki was born September 16, 1969, and started classical piano lessons at age 5; she was also intrigued by her father's jazz trumpet-playing. She began her professional career at the age of twelve by playing gigs in her family's band at the "J" jazz club in Tokyo.

After attending the Tokyo Metropolitan High School for Arts, Shirasaki majored in classical music at the Tokyo National University of Fine Arts and Music and gave concerts as a classical pianist for several years after graduating before returning to play jazz.

Shirasaki moved to New York City in 1997 to pursue a master's degree at the Manhattan School of Music, studying with Kenny Barron. She met and married fellow-student Tom Landman; they lived in the Park Slope section of Brooklyn and had two children. Shirasaki operated the Sakura Music School in Manhattan and Brooklyn, specializing in teaching music to small children with an emphasis on those of Japanese ancestry. She performed regularly in the New York area, as well as touring internationally.

She succumbed to cancer, dying at home on 29 November 2021.

== Career ==
In August 2003 the Japanese indie label What's New Records released her debut trio CD "Existence" (Lewis Nash on drums, Marco Panascia on bass) in Japan. "Musically Yours" her second CD was released in June, 2005. Before giving birth to her two children, Shirasaki's solo piano album Home Alone was released in April 2006. In the same year she has been featured on Marian McPartland's National Public Radio Show Piano Jazz. and on the compilation CD An NPR Jazz Christmas with Marian McPartland and Friends, Vol. 3.

She was a finalist in the Mary Lou Williams Women In Jazz Piano Competition in 2005 and 2006 and the Great American Jazz Piano Competition in 2004, 2005 and 2006.

After taking parental leave she continued her career with a performance at the 1st International Jazz Solo Piano Festival 2009 in Germany. In 2010 she performed at the Jazz Journalists Association Awards Gala.

== Discography ==
- 2003 - Existence
- 2005 - Musically Yours
- 2006 - Home Alone
- 2010 - Falling Leaves - Live in Hamburg
- 2013 - Some Other Time

== Compilations ==
- 2006 - An NPR Christmas Collection with Marian McPartland and Friends
- 2006 - NPR Jazz Christmas With Marian McPartland and Friends III
- 2009 - Best of 1st International Jazz Solo Piano Festival 2009
