= Edwin Swayze =

American jazz trumpeter and composer (1906–1935)

Edwin Swayze or Swayzee (June 13, 1906 – January 31, 1935) was an American jazz trumpeter and composer.

Swayze grew up in Little Rock, Arkansas, and played with Alphonso Trent, Art Sims, Eugene Cook, Alex Hill, Jelly Roll Morton, and Sammie Lewis early in his career. He moved to New York City late in the 1920s, where he continued to work with Morton, before joining Lew Leslie's Blackbirds revue for a tour of Europe. After the show's run he remained in Europe for a time, playing with Herb Flemming's International Rhythm Aces and the Plantation Band, which he led for a spell in Amsterdam. Early in the 1930s he worked with Chick Webb and Sam Wooding before joining Cab Calloway's orchestra in 1932. He wrote several tunes for Calloway, including "Call of the Jitterbug", "Father's Got His Glasses On", and "Good Sauce from the Gravy Bowl".

Swayze died while on tour with Calloway in 1935.
