= Cassino Simpson =

American jazz musician

Wendell "Cassino" Simpson (July 22, 1909 – March 27, 1952) was an American jazz pianist, best known for his associations on the Chicago jazz scene.

Simpson may have studied piano under Zinky Cohn. He first recorded in 1923 with Bernie Young, then recorded with the Moulin Rouge Orchestra in 1925. Following this he joined Arthur Sims's orchestra, recording with them in 1926. Sims died soon after, and Bernie Young took over as bandleader; Simpson remained in the ensemble until 1930. Concomitantly, he recorded with Jabbo Smith's Rhythm Aces on his 1929 Brunswick Records releases.

From 1931 to 1933 he played with Erskine Tate, though he never recorded with him. He recorded as a leader under various names, with Jabbo Smith and Milt Hinton as sidemen. In 1933 he cut a few sides with Half Pint Jaxon, a female impersonator.

Soon after his recordings with Jaxon, Simpson apparently became mentally disturbed, and was institutionalized in 1935 in Elgin, Illinois. While there, he continued to play piano and vibraphone in a hospital dance band, and played bass drum in the hospital's marching band. He recorded solo piano numbers on the grounds of the hospital in the middle of the 1940s. Simpson was never released from the hospital, where he died in 1952.
