= Simon Gore =

Simon Gore (born 1988) is a Welsh guitarist, keyboarder, composer, and audio/visual artist.

== Works ==
- 2016: White Film a new soundtrack to 1978 super 8 short art film by Joseph Bernard (Nonfigurativ Musikk) by permission
- 2016: Origami Reinkarnasjon is a live only, hardware, AV performance collaboration Jack Rees
- 2016: HouseMADE sound art featured a series of site specific works made by 12 artists over the course of two weeks in response to the idea of home and house, hosted and curated by Zoë Gingel
- 2016: ÉN TI an audio/visual project depicting my interpretation of Nordic landscapes
- 2017: Walls multi-sensory, audio/visual collaborative installation by Zoë Gingell and Simon Gore. It is presented as Zoë’s Creative Wales award piece
- 2017: Enthusiasm, segments from a 1931 film with a live score
