= Slick Jones =

American drummer

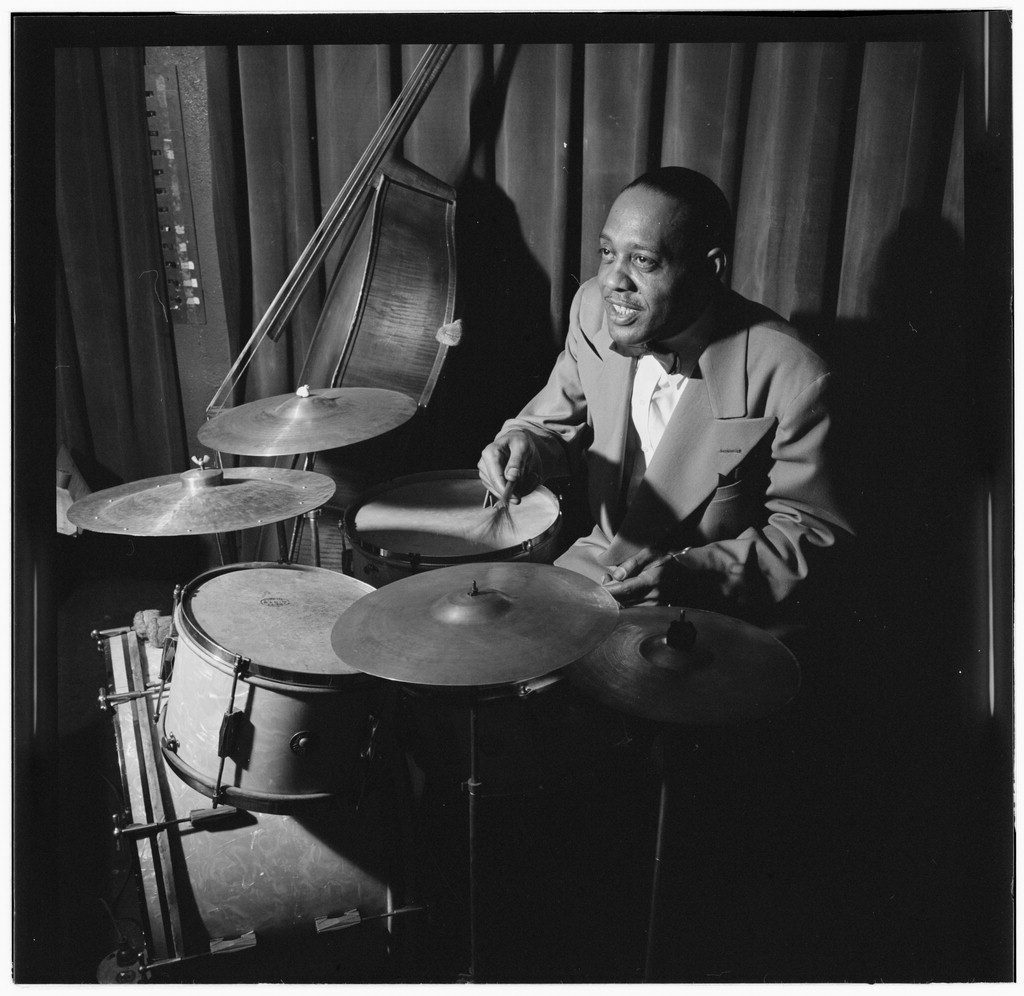

Background information
- Born: April 13, 1907
- Died: November 2, 1969 (aged 62)
- Genres: Jazz

Slick Jones (April 13, 1907 – November 2, 1969) was an American jazz drummer, best known for his work with Fats Waller.

== Life ==
Born Wilmore Jones in Roanoke, Virginia, he worked with Fletcher Henderson from 1934 to 1936, then recorded and toured with Fats Waller from 1936 to 1941. Concomitantly he also appeared on record with Gene Sedric, Don Redman, Lionel Hampton, and Una Mae Carlisle. Following his time with Waller, he played with Stuff Smith, Eddie South, Claude Hopkins, Hazel Scott, and Don Byas, in addition to further work with Sedric and Redman. In the 1950s he worked with Sidney Bechet, Wilbur DeParis (1954–55), and Doc Cheatham. He worked with Eddie Durham and Eddie Barefield in the 1960s, and remained active almost up until his death, though he never recorded as a leader.
