= Kate Michaels =

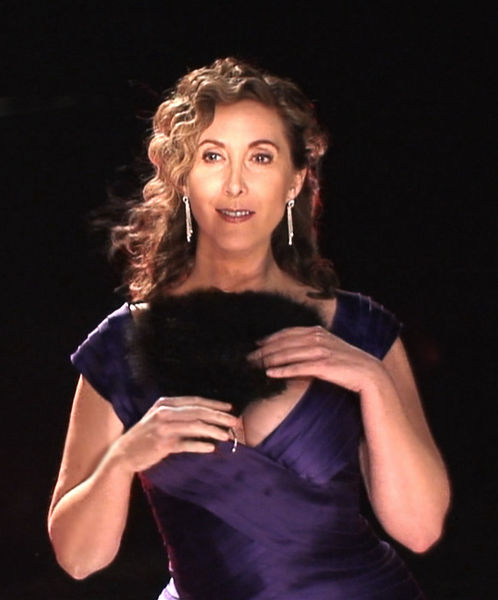
- Kate Michaels in April 2014

Background information
- Birth name: Kathleen Rebecca Hall
- Born: June 2, 1969 (age 56); Yuba City, California, U.S.
- Genres: Classical crossover, big band, jazz, musicals, cabaret, folk-pop, adult contemporary
- Occupation(s): Singer, actress
- Labels: Michaels Media

Kate Michaels (born Kathleen Rebecca Hall, June 2, 1969) is an American singer and actress specializing in big band/swing and musical theater.

== Biography ==
Kate Michaels is from Yuba City, one of the northernmost towns in the California Central Valley. Her mother, Janet Davis Mahan, was a high school teacher from the Sutter Buttes region and part of the Davis family receiving a portion of the original land grant made by John Sutter to the Davis family for helping to settle California. Her father, Edward Proper Hall, was a dentist and died from cancer before the age of 30.

Michaels grew up in a musical family. Edward Hall had a background as a classical pianist and all of the family sang and played different instruments. Her great-uncle, Hedley Hall, was a colorful vaudeville player and local radio personality. Her primary influences have been folk, musical theater, swing and jazz. Michaels, who was raised in California, has lived in Singapore, Austria and Germany; she currently lives in Basel, Switzerland.

== Musical career ==
Early in her career, Michaels appeared in both leading and supporting roles for many stage, musical and concert productions in the San Francisco, Sacramento, Napa Valley and Los Angeles areas. After receiving the Irma Cooper scholarship for the American Institute of Musical Studies in Graz, Austria, Michaels moved to Bremen, Germany for a role in the world premiere of the German operetta, Himmelrand with Opera Piccola. Shortly thereafter, Michaels joined the original Swiss cast of Andrew Lloyd Webber's The Phantom of the Opera with the British production company, Really Useful Group in Basel, Switzerland.

In 1998, Michaels sang for the UK tour of the Australian-American poetic piece, Walking the Dog, produced by Walking the Dog Theater Company, New York. Soon after her first album, Just Marilyn, was produced. Her second recording, The Best Things in Life, a jazz recording with German jazz trio The Red Thread was released in 2007.

As an educator and consultant Michaels has given workshops and seminars as well as taught for the following institutions and programs: University of Berkeley extension program SF, St. Mary's College of California, The American Conservatory Theater, The New Conservatory Theater, Basel Jazz School, Bern Jazz School, Zürich Theater and Dance School. She has also been published in Classical Singer Magazine and various newsletters.

== Musical styles and projects ==
Michaels has been described as "Enchanting, charming and delightful" (JJ Murry-Leach, Decca Records) and been widely praised for her vocal talent and her emotional and witty interpretations. Focusing on big band songs from the Great American Songbook, Just Marilyn reaches into the big band era and builds on the glamor of Marilyn Monroe. All the songs from Just Marilyn recorded by Michaels were sung at some point by film icon and legend Marilyn Monroe. When asked "Why Marilyn?" Kate said in an interview that there's more to Marilyn than "Happy Birthday, Mr. President", light comedies and the white dress. "She was one of the first women to take control of her own career and beat the studio heads at their own game. Marilyn was not one dimensional but I think that's how she is often viewed, unfortunately."

The concept for her second album, The Best Things in Life, came after hearing a recording of Jo Stafford singing The Best Things in Life are Free. Interested in the work of Jamie Cullum and Stacey Kent, Michaels put together newer jazz versions of standard songs from the Great American Songbook with the German jazz trio, The Red Thread.

Michaels performs as a soloist and with the shows Swinging the Marilyn Monroe Songbook, Big Band Sizzle, Gossip, Glitter & Glam as well as musicals and concerts with The Red Thread and various big bands in France, Germany, Switzerland, Australia, Spain, Norway, England and New Zealand. Michaels appears as the featured performer for festivals, charity events, and performances which have also featured well-known singers and entertainers such as German folk singer Roberto Blanco.

== Discography ==
- Just Marilyn (2003)
- The Best Things in Life (2007)
