= Fuerte Quemado =

Coordinates: 26°37′S 66°03′W

- Municipality and village
- Interactive map of Fuerte Quemado
- Country: Argentina
- Province: Catamarca Province
- Time zone: UTC−3 (ART)

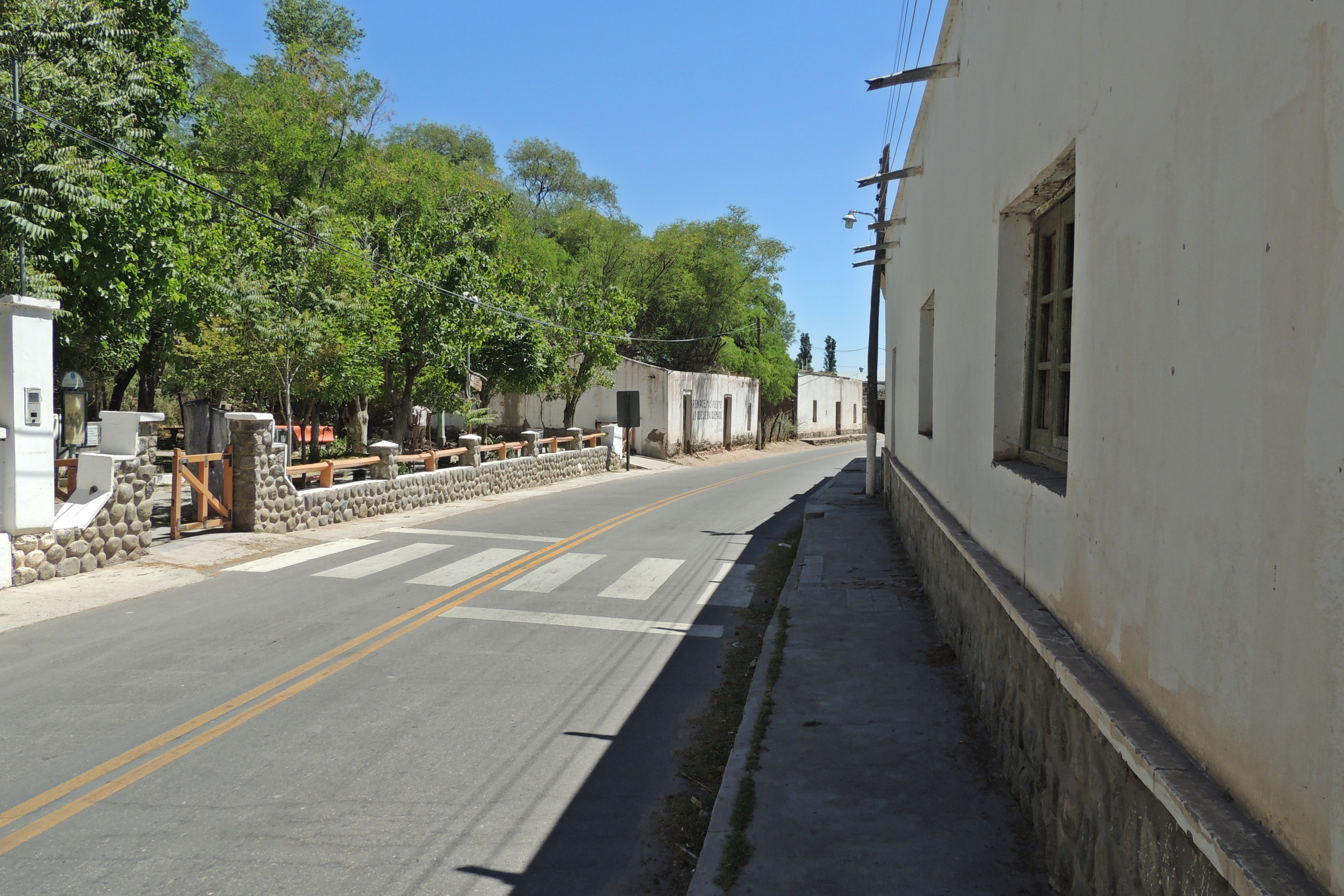
Ruta 40 in Fuerte Quemado, Catamarca

Fuerte Quemado is a village and municipality in Catamarca Province in northwestern Argentina. It is about 15 km away from south of Quilmes and situated on the left bank of the Santa Maria River in Argentina.

== Population ==
According to the 2001 census (INDEC, 2001) the village has 444 inhabitants representing an increase of 11.27% from 399 inhabitants as per previous census (INDEC, 1991).
