= Leon Prima =

American jazz musician

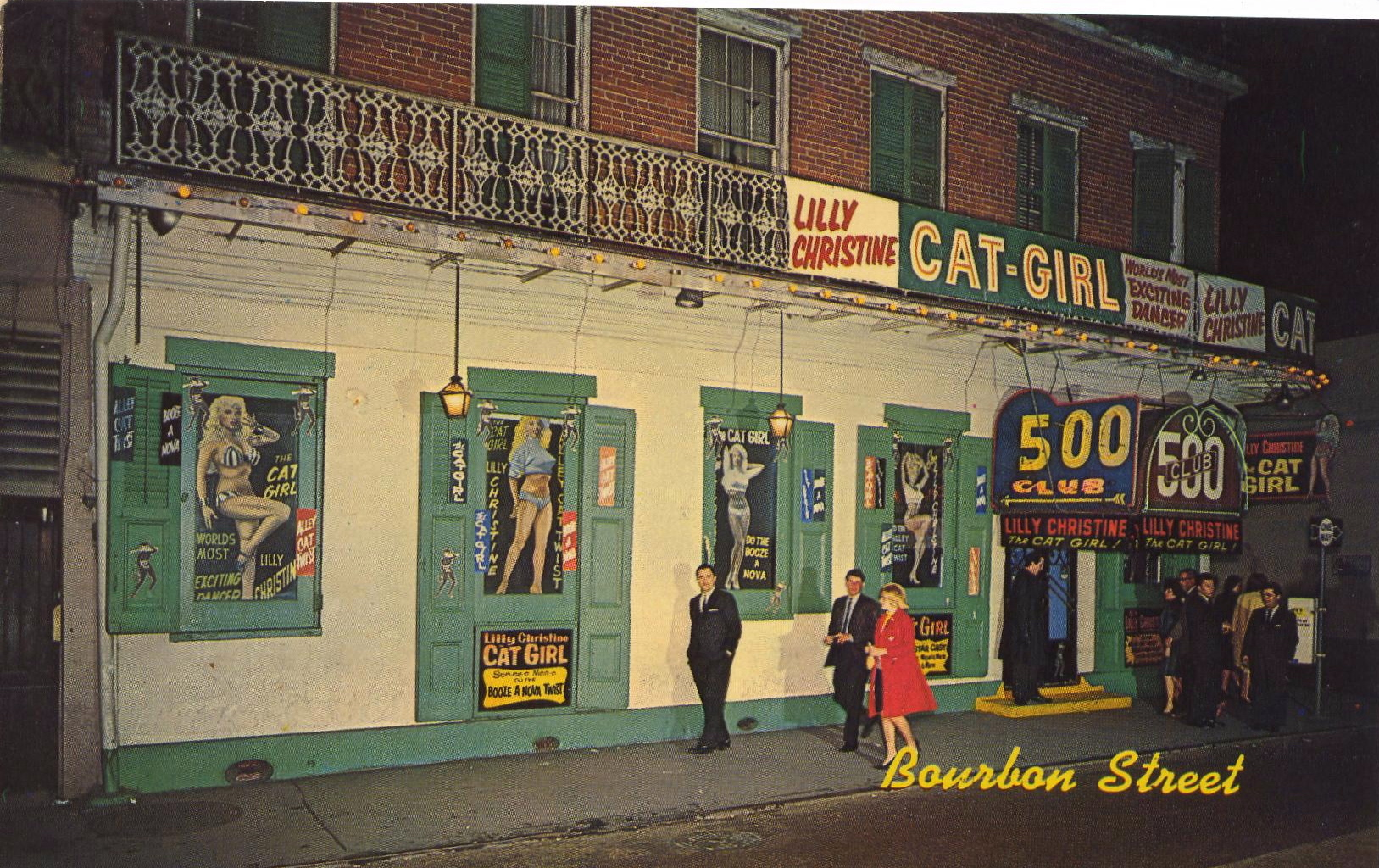
Leon Prima's 500 Club, Bourbon Street, New Orleans 1960s

Leon Prima (July 28, 1907, New Orleans – August 15, 1985) was an American jazz trumpeter and the older brother of singer Louis Prima.

He started on piano before learning the trumpet. His early jobs were with Ray Bauduc, Leon Roppolo, Jack Teagarden, and Peck Kelley (1925–27). He and Sharkey Bonano led the group the Melody Masters in the late 1920s and early 1930s.

He played in Louis Prima's big band from 1940 to 1946 in New York City. After moving back to New Orleans, he led his own ensemble and managed more than one nightclub, then retired in 1955 to take up a career in real estate.
