= Manuel Mota (guitarist) =

- Born: 22 October 1970 (age 56); Lisbon, Portugal
- Genre: Free improvisation
- Occupation: Musician
- Instrument: Guitar
- Years active: 1976–present
- Label: Headlights

Manuel Mota (born October 22, 1970) is a jazz guitarist from Lisbon, Portugal.

== Career ==
Mota started playing guitar at 15. Although his interest was in blues rock, he turned to free improvisation and experimental music in the 1980s. He has a degree in architecture and owns the record label Headlights.

== Discography ==
=== As leader ===
- I Wish I'd Never Met You (Headlights, 1999)
- For Your Protection Why Don't You Just Paint Yourself Real Good Like an Indian (Headlights, 2001)
- Leopardo (Rossbin, 2002)
- Quartets (Headlights, 2004)
- Outubro (Headlights, 2006)
- Sings (Headlights, 2009)
- ST 13 (Headlights, 2014)
- 090114 (Headlights, 2014)
- Blackie - Solo Guitar (Headlights, 2014)
- Sete (Headlights, 2015)
- Exodus (Headlights, 2015)
- Lacrau with David Grubbs (Blue Chopsticks, 2018)

=== Other ===
- Brumel: Earthquake Mass with Graindelavoix & Björn Schmelzer (Glossa, 2024)
