= Fulton McGrath =

American jazz musician

Fulton "Fidgy" McGrath (December 6, 1907 – January 1, 1958) was an American jazz pianist and songwriter.

McGrath played with Red Nichols early in the 1930s, then joined the band of The Dorsey Brothers, in addition to working extensively as a studio musician and in radio orchestras. From 1935-37 McGrath played in Lennie Hayton's radio ensemble, then played later in the decade with Bunny Berigan, Joe Venuti, and Chauncey Morehouse. After spending time in an NBC orchestra, he moved to the West Coast around 1943, where he worked on film soundtracks in Hollywood.

McGrath was the father-in-law of Victor Feldman. His compositions include "Shim Sham Shimmy" and "Mandy Is Two", the latter of which was recorded by Billie Holiday.
