= Jacques Butler =

American musician (1909–2003)

Jacques Butler (sometimes Jack Butler) (April 29, 1909 – 2003) was an American jazz trumpeter and vocalist.

Butler was raised in Washington, DC, where he picked up trumpet in his late teens. He played with Cliff Jackson and Horace Henderson in New York City, then joined Marion Hardy's Alabamians in 1931-32. He led his own ensemble in 1934-1935 and made recordings with Willie Bryant before relocating to Europe in 1936. There he played for several years with Willie Lewis, as well as with Frank "Big Boy" Goudie and with his own bands. In 1940 he was in New York again, where he played with Mercer Ellington, Art Hodes, Mezz Mezzrow, and Bingie Madison. After a brief stay in Toronto he moved back to Europe in 1950, remaining there until 1968 as a regular at the La Cigale club in Paris. In the 1970s he worked often in New York, as a sideman with Clyde Bernhardt among others.
