= Lelo Nika =

Serbian and Romanian Romani accordionist (born 1969)

Lelo Nika (born 1969) is a Serbian and Romanian Romani accordionist who lives in Denmark. He plays a mixture of Balkan jazz and Romanian music.

He comes from Nikolinci, near Belgrade, Serbia, which has a large Romanian population. He moved with his family to Helsingør, Denmark, in 1970, for three years. Starting in 1979, he studied under Serbian accordionist Branimir Djokic. He studied at the Malmö Academy of Music in Sweden and the Danish Accordion Academy and has twice won first prize at the World Accordion Championship.
