= Edward Inge =

American jazz musician

Edward Inge (May 7, 1906 – October 8, 1988) was an American jazz arranger and reedist.

Inge was raised in Kansas City and played clarinet from age 12. He played with George Reynolds's Orchestra when he was 18, then worked with Dewey Jackson, Art Sims & His Creole Roof Orchestra, and Oscar Young in the 1920s. In 1930, he became a member of McKinney's Cotton Pickers, then was offered a spot in Don Redman's band in 1931, where he played until 1939. From there he replaced Don Byas in Andy Kirk's band, remaining with Kirk until 1943.

After the early 1940s Inge became more in demand as an arranger, writing charts for Louis Armstrong, Redman, and Jimmie Lunceford among many others over the course of his career. He led his own band in Cleveland in the middle of the 1940s, then worked out of Buffalo, New York in the 1950s and 1960s. In the 1960s he played with Cecil Johnson, and in the 1970s with C.Q. Price.

Inge's recording credits include work with The Mills Brothers, Cab Calloway, and The Boswell Sisters.
