= 1975 in jazz =

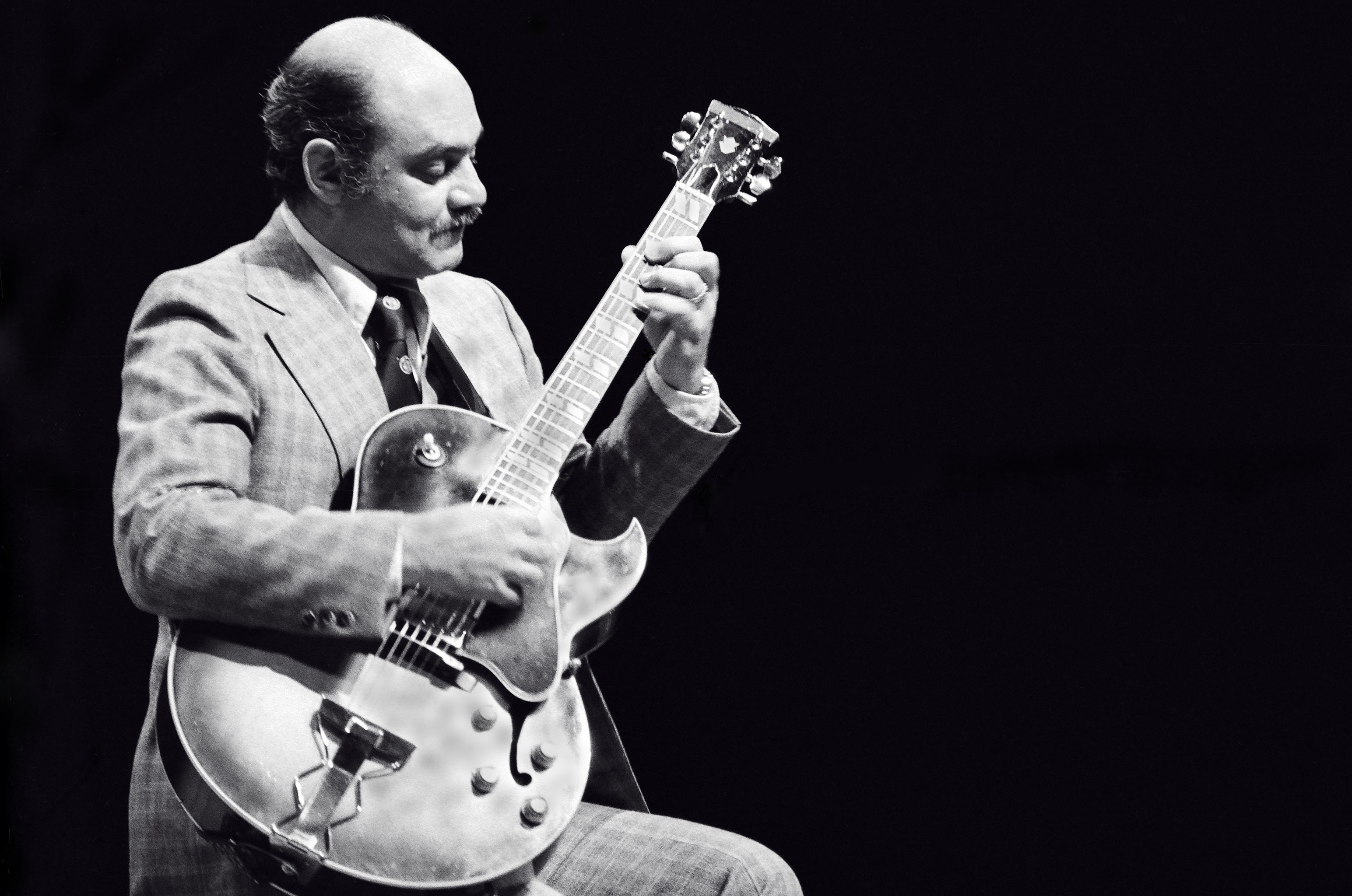
- Joe Pass 1975
- Decade: 1970s in jazz
- Music: 1975 in music
- Standards: List of post-1950 jazz standards
- See also: 1974 in jazz – 1976 in jazz

This is a timeline documenting events of Jazz in the year 1975.

== Events ==
- January 24 – Jazz pianist Keith Jarrett plays the solo improvisation The Köln Concert at the Cologne Opera. The live recording becomes the best-selling piano recording in history.
- March 21 – The 2nd Vossajazz opens in Vossavangen, Norway, running until March 23.
- May 16 – The 4th Moers Festival opens in Moers, Germany, running until May 19.
- May 21 – The 3rd Nattjazz festival opens in Bergen, Norway, running until June 4.
- June 27 – – The 22nd Newport Jazz Festival New York opens in New York City, United States, running until July 6).
- July 3 – The 9th Montreux Jazz Festival started in Montreux, Switzerland, running until July 20.
- September 19 – The 18th Monterey Jazz Festival started in Monterey, California, United States, running until September 21.

== Album releases ==
- Keith Jarrett: The Köln Concert
- Revolutionary Ensemble: The People's Republic
- Miles Davis: Agharta
- Evan Parker: Saxophone Solos
- Leroy Jenkins: For Players Only
- Air: Air Song
- Oliver Lake: Heavy Spirits
- Kenny Wheeler: Gnu High
- Om: Kirikuki
- Terje Rypdal: Odyssey
- Steve Lacy: Dreams
- Anthony Braxton: Five Pieces 1975
- Don Pullen: Solo Piano Album
- Dexter Gordon: Bouncin' with Dex
- Michael Mantler: Michael Mantler – Carla Bley
- Sonny Sharrock: Paradise
- Dudu Pukwana: Diamond Express
- George Finola: No Words, Just George
- Kenny Barron: Lucifer
- Frank Lowe: The Flam
- John Surman: S.O.S.
- Don Pullen: Healing Force
- Julius Hemphill: Coon Bid'ness
- Gateway Trio: Gateway
- Collin Walcott: Cloud Dance
- Don Moye: Sun Percussion
- Martial Solal: Nothing But Piano
- Eberhard Weber: Yellow Fields
- Don Pullen: Five to Go
- Charles Tolliver: Impact
- Lol Coxhill: Welfare State
- David Liebman: Forgotten Fantasies
- Joe McPhee: The Willisau Concert
- Yōsuke Yamashita: Chiasma
- Michael Mantler: The Hapless Child
- Dollar Brand: Soweto
- Don Pullen: Capricorn Rising
- Stanley Clarke: Journey to Love
- Enrico Rava: The Pilgrim and the Stars
- The Manhattan Transfer: The Manhattan Transfer
- Cortex: Troupeau Bleu
- Takeshi Shibuya: Dream

== Deaths ==
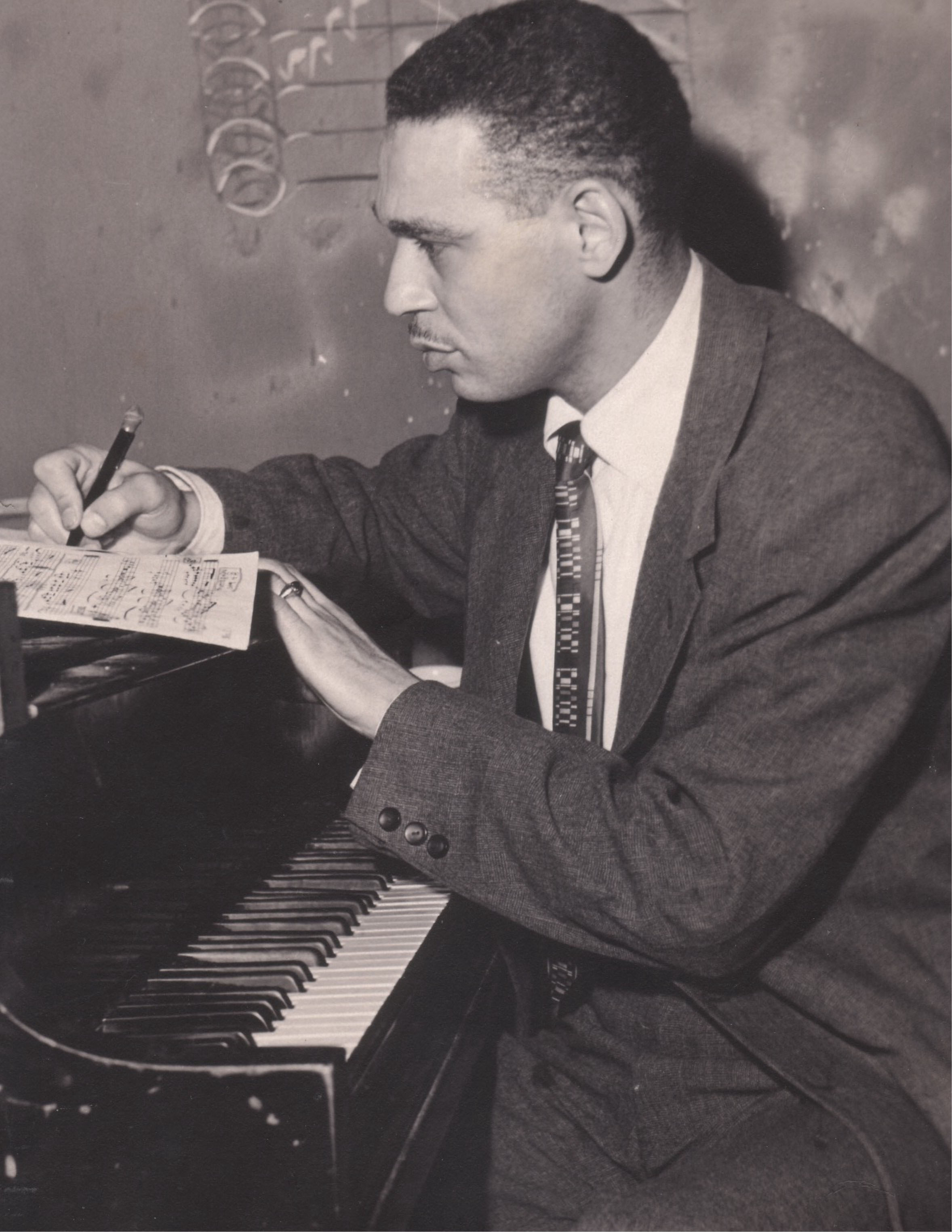
Earl Washington, jazz pianist "THE GHOST"

January

- 3 – René Thomas, Belgian guitarist (born 1927).

February

- 5 – Åke Persson, Swedish trombonist (born 1932).

March

- 4 – Cornel Chiriac, Romanian radio producer, record producer, and drummer (born 1941).
- 15 – Sandy Brown, Scottish clarinetist and band leader (born 1929).
- 16 – T-Bone Walker, American guitarist, singer, songwriter and multi-instrumentalist (born 1910).
- 27 – Pete Clarke, British saxophonist and clarinetist (died 1975).

April

- 12 – Josephine Baker, French singer, entertainer, activist, and Resistance agent (born 1906).

May

- 11 – Benny Harris, American trumpeter and composer (born 1919).
- 13 – Tubby Hall, American drummer (born 1895).

June

- 18 – Earl Washington, American pianist (born 1921).

July

- 14 – Zutty Singleton, American drummer (born 1898).
- 16 – Pippo Starnazza, Italian singer and actor (born 1909).
- 21 – Theodore Carpenter, American trumpet player, singer, and band leader (born 1898).

August

- 8 – Cannonball Adderley, American alto saxophonist (born 1928).

October

- 28 – Oliver Nelson, American saxophonist, clarinetist, arranger, composer, and bandleader (born 1932).

November

- 14 – Artemi Ayvazyan, Soviet-Armenian composer, conductor, and founder of the Armenian State Jazz Orchestra (born 1902).

December

- 11 – Lee Wiley, American singer (born 1908).
- 14 – Mongezi Feza, South African trumpeter and flautist (born 1945).
- 17
  - Fess Williams, American clarinetist and alto saxophonist (born 1894).
  - Stan Wrightsman, American pianist (born 1910).

Unknown date

- Trevor Koehler, American saxophonist (born 1935).

== Births ==
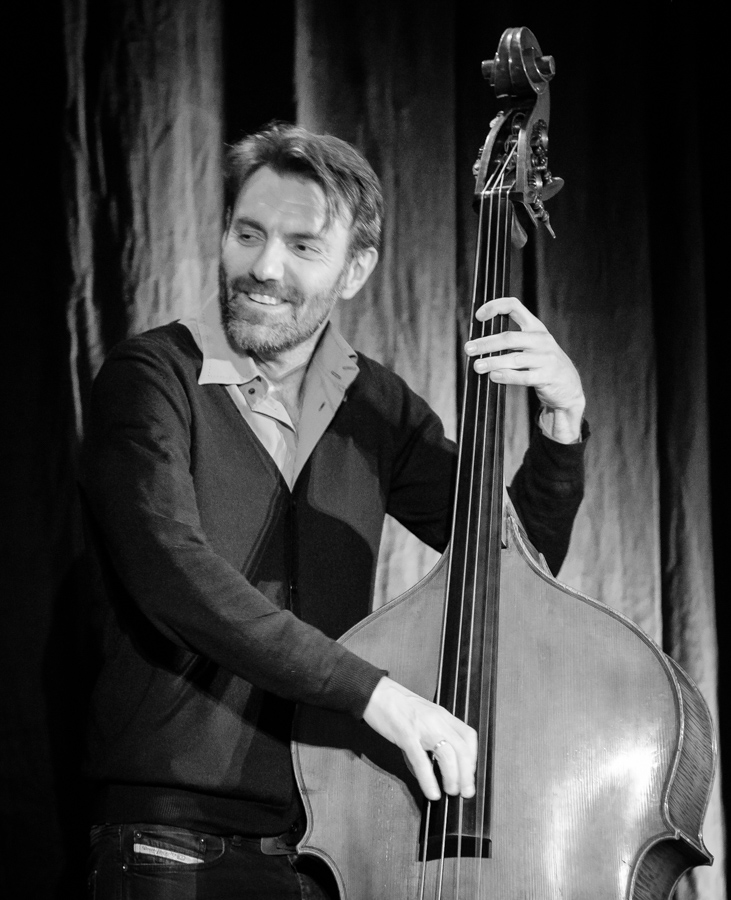
Mats Eilertsen at the 2017 Jazz på Jølst.

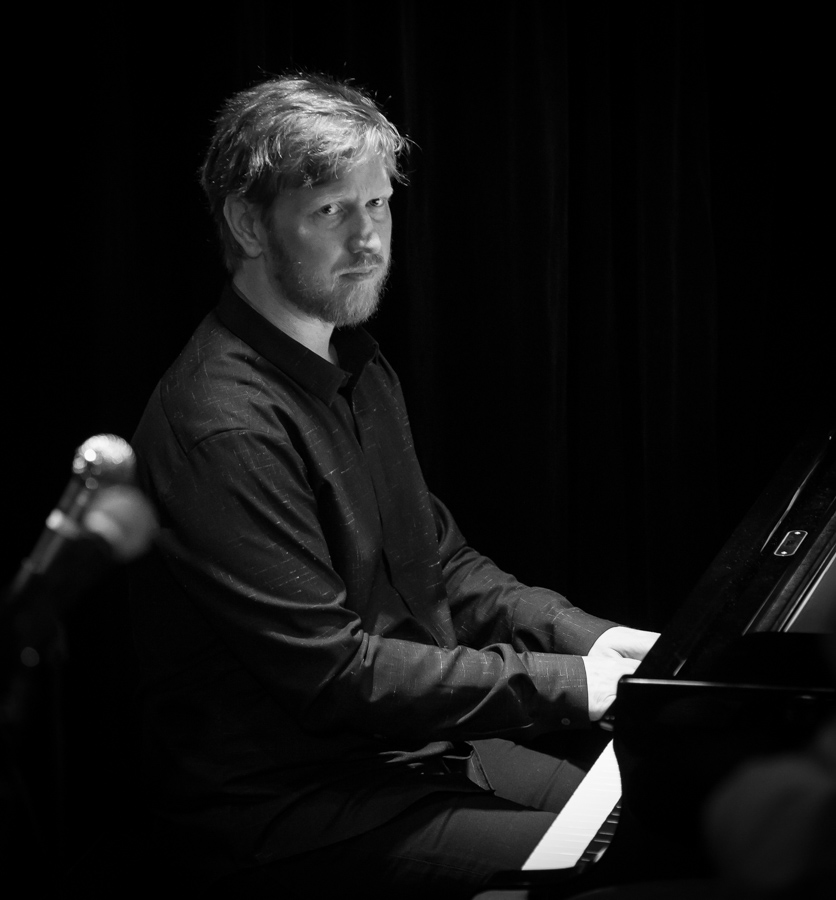
Helge Lien at Victoria, Oslo Jazzfestival 2017.

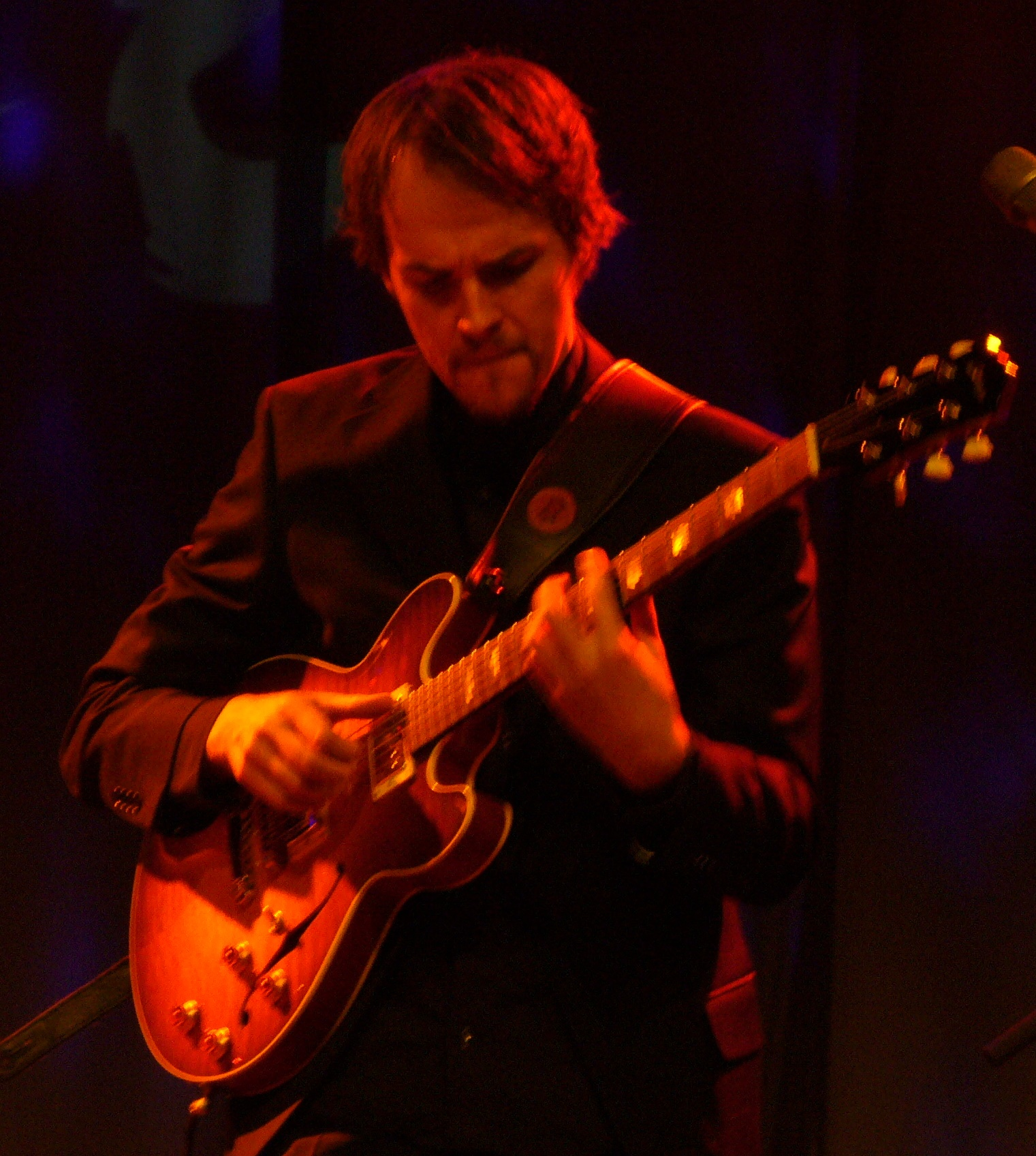
Gisle Torvik at the 2014 Vossajazz.

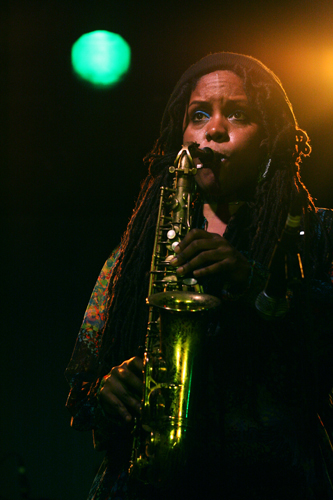
Matana Roberts 2007.

January

- 17 – Squarepusher or Tom Jenkinson, English electronic musician and composer.
- 18 – Géraldine Laurent, French alto saxophonist.
- 21 – Jason Moran, American pianist and composer.

February

- 7 – Kellylee Evans, Canadian singer.

March

- 4 – Mats Eilertsen, Norwegian upright bassist and composer, Food and Dingobats.
- 9 – Øyvind Storesund, Norwegian upright bassist, Cloroform and Kaizers Orchestra.
- 10 – Håvard Wiik, Norwegian pianist and composer, Atomic.
- 14 – Gianluca Petrella, Italian trombonist.
- 17 – Jairzinho Oliveira, Brazilian singer, songwriter, and composer.
- 18 – Sondre Meisfjord, Norwegian bassist, cellist, and composer, Come Shine.
- 22 – Steinar Raknes, Norwegian upright bassist, Urban Connection and The Core.
- 25 – David Braid, Canadian pianist and composer.
- 27 – Katja Toivola, Finnish trombonist.
- 28 – Orrin Evans, American pianist.

April

- 12 – Lars Andreas Haug, Norwegian tubist.
- 13 – Jan Harbeck, Danish saxophonist and composer.
- 23
  - Helge Lien, Norwegian pianist, composer, and band leader.
  - Rolf-Erik Nystrøm, Norwegian saxophonist and composer.
- 27
  - Fabrizio Sotti, Italian guitarist, composer, songwriter, and producer.
  - Jozef Dumoulin, Belgian keyboarder and composer.

May

- 1 – Aslak Hartberg, Norwegian rapper and bassist.
- 7 – Gunhild Carling, Swedish trombonist and multi-instrumentalist.
- 15 – Frode Haltli, Norwegian accordionist.

June

- 2 – Gisle Torvik, Norwegian guitarist, composer, and band leader.
- 16 – Jannike Kruse, Norwegian singer, artist and actor.

July

- 11 – Chris Gall, German pianist and composer.
- 22 – Erik Johannessen, Norwegian trombonist and composer, Jaga Jazzist and Trondheim Jazz Orchestra.
- 23 – Céline Bonacina, French saxophonist, composer, and bandleader.

August

- 1 – Håkon Mjåset Johansen, Norwegian drummer and composer, Trondheim Jazz Orchestra.
- 22 – Taylor Ho Bynum, American cornetist, flugelhornist, trumpeter, composer, educator, and writer.
- 24 – Michael Magalon, Belgian bassist, guitarist, and composer.

October

- 2 – Kåre Opheim, Norwegian drumMer, Real Ones.
- 12 – Espen Aalberg, Norwegian drummer.
- 26 – Ole Marius Sandberg, Norwegian bassist.

November

- 26 – Arne Jansen, German guitarist, composer, and band leader.
- 27 – Frode Nymo, Norwegian jazz musician (alto Saxophonist), Trondheim Jazz Orchestra and Urban Connection.

December

- 5 – Søren Bebe, Danish pianist and composer.

Unknown date

- Jacob Anderskov, Danish pianist, composer and bandleader.
- Lionel Friedli, Swiss percussionist.
- Marcin Wasilewski, Polish pianist and composer.
- Matana Roberts, American sound experimentalist, visual artist, jazz saxophonist and clarinetist, and composer.
- Niki King, Scottish singer.
- Paul Harrison, English pianist, keyboarder, organist, and composer.

== See also ==
- 1970s in jazz
- List of years in jazz
- 1975 in music
