= 1974 in jazz =

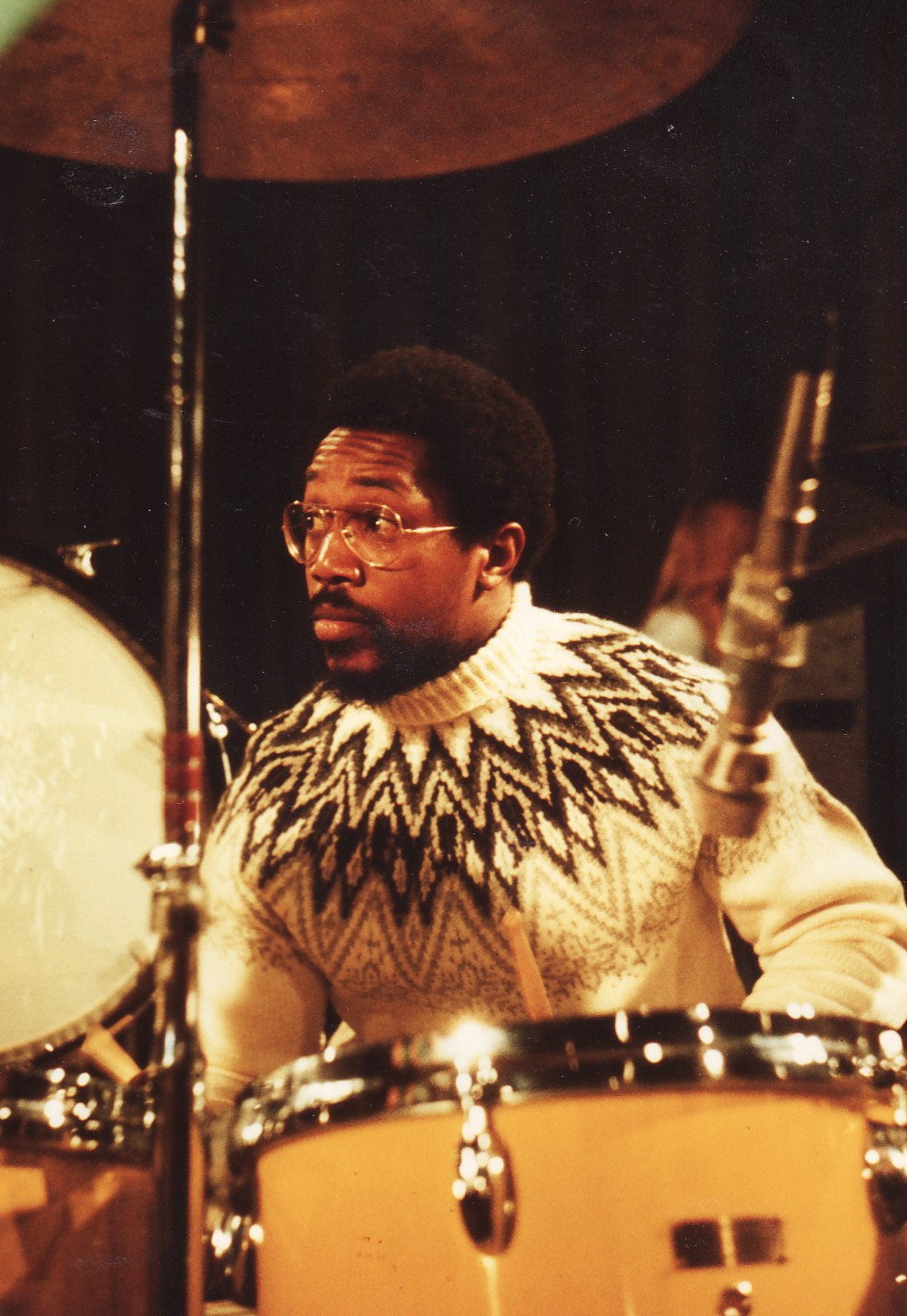
- Billy Cobham during his Crosswinds tour at Kongeberg Jazzfestival in July 1974
- Decade: 1970s in jazz
- Music: 1974 in music
- Standards: List of post-1950 jazz standards
- See also: 1973 in jazz – 1975 in jazz

This is a timeline documenting events of Jazz in the year 1974.

== Events ==
=== April ===
- 5 – The very first Vossajazz started in Vossavangen, Norway (April 5 – 7).

=== May ===
- 22 – The 2nd Nattjazz started in Bergen, Norway (May 22 – June 5).
- 31 – The 3rd Moers Festival started in Moers, Germany (May 31 – June 1).

=== June ===
- 28
  - The 21st Newport Jazz Festival started in Newport, Rhode Island (June 28 – July 7).
  - The 8th Montreux Jazz Festival started in Montreux, Switzerland (June 28 – July 7).

=== September ===
- 20 – The 17th Monterey Jazz Festival started in Monterey, California (September 20 – 22).

=== Unknown date ===
- The First International Boogie Woogie Festival at WDR Cologne, Germany, on Sept.14/15 1974, with Memphis Slim, Willie Mabon, Axel Zwingenberger, Bob Hall, Jo-Ann Kelly, Vince Weber among others, organized by Hans W. Ewert for Radio WDR

== Album releases ==
- Sam Rivers: Crystals
- Cecil Taylor: Silent Tongues
- Steve Lacy: Saxophone Special
- Jeanne Lee: Conspiracy
- Leo Smith: Reflectativity
- Weather Report: Mysterious Traveller
- Randy Weston: Blues To Africa
- Marion Brown: Sweet Earth Flying
- Paul Rutherford: The Gentle Harm of the Bourgeoisie
- Marvin Peterson: Children of the Fire
- John Abercrombie: Timeless
- Roswell Rudd: Flexible Flyer
- McCoy Tyner: Atlantis
- Globe Unity Orchestra: Hamburg '74
- Cecil McBee: Mutima
- Mahavishnu Orchestra: Apocalypse
- Ralph Towner: Solstice
- Terje Rypdal: Whenever I Seem To Be Far Away
- Roscoe Mitchell: Solo Saxophone Concerts
- Steve Kuhn: Ecstasy
- Joe McPhee: Pieces of Light
- Keith Jarrett: Death and the Flower
- Steve Kuhn: Trance
- Steve Lacy: Scraps
- David Liebman: Drum Ode
- Kenny Barron: Peruvian Blue
- Tete Montoliu: Music for Perla
- Bill Watrous: Manhattan Wildlife Refuge
- Lonnie Liston Smith: Expansions
- Mike Gibbs: Only Chrome Waterfall
- McCoy Tyner: Sama Layuca
- Oregon: Winter Light
- Billy Cobham: Total Eclipse
- Hugh Masekela: I Am Not Afraid
- Miles Davis: Get Up With It
- Herbie Hancock: Thrust
- Gene Ammons: Brasswind

== Deaths ==
January

- 10 – Eddie Safranski, American upright bassist (born 1918).
- 23 – Don Fagerquist, American trumpeter (born 1927).
- 26
  - Archie Semple, Scottish clarinetist (born 1928).
  - Joe Benjamin, American upright bassist. (born 1919).
- 28 – Ed Allen, American jazz trumpeter and cornetist (born 1897).

February

- 25 – Julian Dash, American tenor (born 1916).

March

- 1 – Bobby Timmons, American pianist and composer (born 1935).
- 9 – Floyd Bean, American jazz pianist (born 1904).
- 22 – Sam Donahue, American tenor saxophonist, trumpeter and musical arranger (born 1918).

April

- 11 – Fud Candrix, Belgian saxophonist and violinist (born 1908).

May

- 4 – Geraldo, English bandleader and composer (born 1904).
- 15 – Paul Gonsalves, American tenor saxophonist (born 1920).
- 24 – Duke Ellington, American composer, pianist, and bandleader (born 1899).

August

- 6 – Gene Ammons, American tenor saxophonist (born 1925).
- 9 – Bill Chase, American trumpeter (born 1934).
- 13 – Tina Brooks, American tenor saxophonist and composer (born 1932).
- 21 – Marvin Ash, American pianist (born 1914).
- 25 – Gus Viseur, Belgian-French button accordionist (born 1915).

October

- 8 – Harry Carney, American saxophonist (born 1910).
- 18 – John Anderson, American trumpeter (born 1921).

November

- 19 – George Brunies, American trombonist (born 1902).

== Births ==
January

- 4
  - Hild Sofie Tafjord, Norwegian French hornist.
  - Sjur Miljeteig, Norwegian trumpeter, composer, and author.

February

- 17 – Bernt Moen, Norwegian pianist, keyboarder, and composer.
- 21 – Benjamin Koppel, Danish saxophonist.
- 27 – Alexi Tuomarila, Finnish pianist and composer.

March

- 27 – Lars Skoglund, Norwegian composer, guitarist, and drummer.

April

- 10 – Beate S. Lech, Norwegian singer, composer, and lyricist.
- 18 – Madeleine Peyroux, American singer-songwriter.
- 24 – Niño Josele, Spanish guitarist and exponent of the New Flamenco style.
- 29 – Børre Dalhaug, Norwegian drummer.
- 30 – Aaron Goldberg, American pianist.

May

- 29 – Coleman Mellett, American guitarist (died 2009).
- 30 – Nick Etwell, British trumpeter, The Filthy Six.

July

- 7 – Kenneth Ekornes, Norwegian percussionist.
- 10 – Kai Fagaschinski, German clarinetist and composer.
- 17 – Laura Macdonald, Scottish alto and soprano saxophonist, composer and teacher.
- 22 – Kåre Nymark, Norwegian trumpeter and composer.
- 29 – Viktoria Tolstoy, Swedish singer.
- 31 – Dafnis Prieto, Cuban-American drummer, composer, bandleader, and educator.

August

- 13 – Magnus Lindgren, Swedish saxophonist, flautist, and clarinetist.

September

- 10 – Lasse Marhaug, Norwegian electronic musician.
- 24 – Miriam Aïda, Swedish singer.
- 30 – Varre Vartiainen, Finnish guitarist.

October

- 25 – Victor Kunonga, Zimbabwean singer and songwriter.

November

- 4 – Simon Spillett, English tenor saxophonist.
- 15 – Reuben Rogers, American bassist.
- 23 – Frode Kjekstad, Norwegian guitarist.
- 26 – Line Horntveth, Norwegian tubist, flautist, percussionist, and singer, Jaga Jazzist.

December

- 6 – Stefan Pasborg, Danish drummer, composer, and bandleader.
- 14 – Nate Smith, American drummer, songwriter, and producer.
- 17 – Anders Aarum, Norwegian pianist and composer.
- 18 – Miles Okazaki, American guitarist and composer.
- 21 – Knut Aalefjær, Norwegian drummer.
- 24
  - Sophie Alour, French saxophonist.
  - Paal Nilssen-Love, Norwegian drummer.
- 26 – Chihiro Yamanaka, Japanese pianist and composer.

Unknown date

- Biel Ballester, Spanish guitarist.
- Jonathan Bratoeff, French guitarist.
- Martin Tingvall, Swedish pianist, composer, and bandleader.

== See also ==
- 1970s in jazz
- List of years in jazz
- 1974 in music
