= 1984 in jazz =

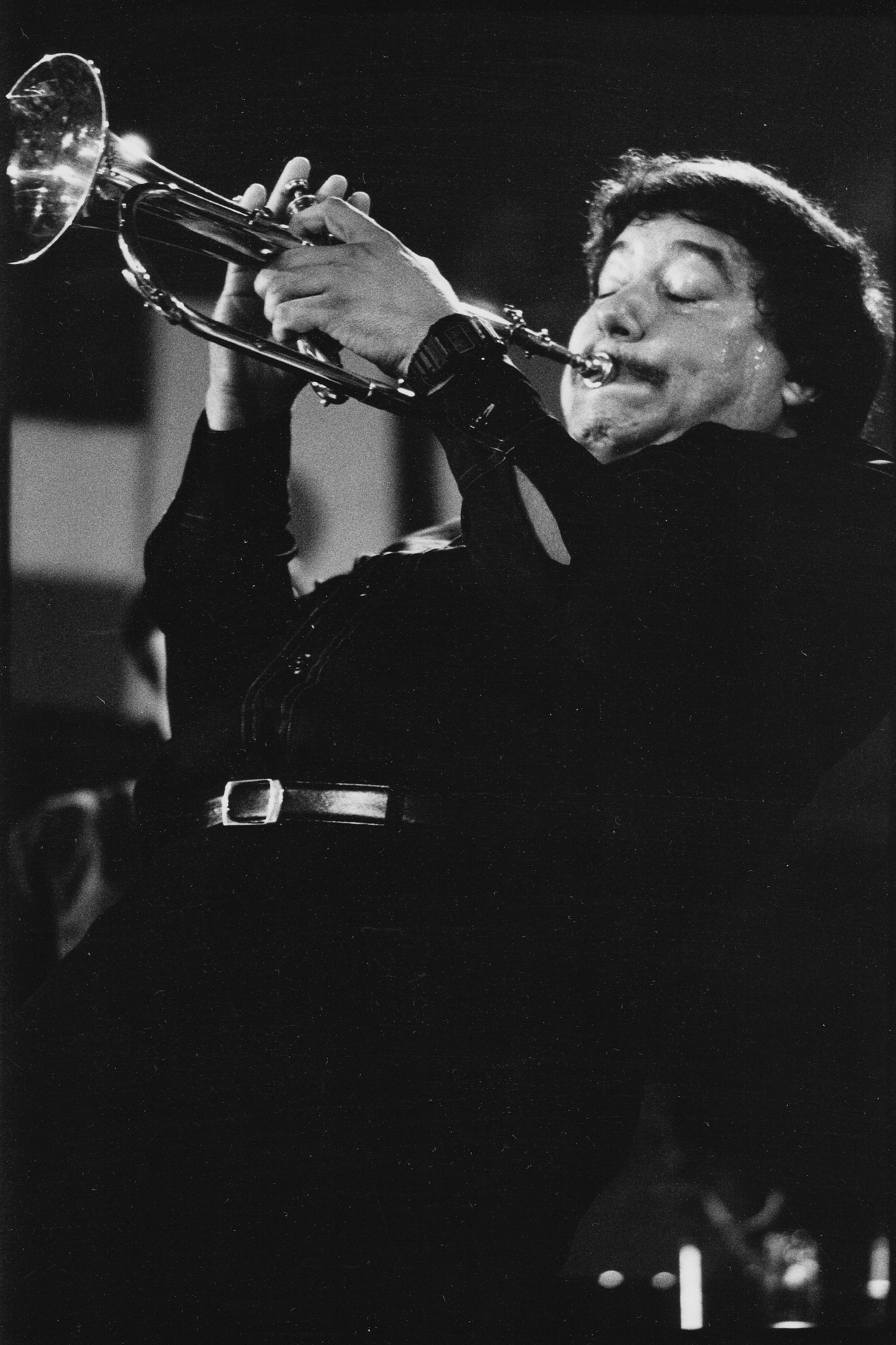
- Jazz trumpeter Arturo Sandoval, International Jazz Festival, Prague, Lucerna Music Hall, 1984
- Decade: 1980s in jazz
- Music: 1984 in music
- Standards: List of post-1950 jazz standards
- See also: 1983 in jazz – 1985 in jazz

This is a timeline documenting events of Jazz in the year 1984.

== Events ==
=== April ===
- 13 – The 11th Vossajazz started in Vossavangen, Norway (April 13 – 15).

=== May ===
- 23 – 12th Nattjazz started in Bergen, Norway (May 23 – June 6).

=== June ===
- 8 – 13th Moers Festival started in Moers, Germany (June 8 – 11).
- 29 – The 5th Montreal International Jazz Festival started in Montreal, Quebec, Canada (June 29 – July 8).

=== July ===
- 5 – The 18th Montreux Jazz Festival started in Montreux, Switzerland (July 5 – 21).
- 13 – The 9th North Sea Jazz Festival started in The Hague, Netherlands (July 13 – 15).

=== August ===
- 17 – The very first Brecon Jazz Festival started in Brecon, Wales (April 17 – 19).

=== September ===
- 14 – The 27th Monterey Jazz Festival started in Monterey, California (September 14 – 16).

== Album releases ==
- John Zorn: Locus Solus
- Geri Allen: The Printmakers
- Steps Ahead: Modern Times
- Oliver Lake: Expandable Language
- Henry Threadgill: Subject To Change
- Hal Russell: Conserving NRG
- Microscopic Septet: Let's Flip
- Joachim Kuhn: Distance
- Henry Kaiser: Invite The Spirit
- Mark Helias: Split Image
- Hilton Ruiz: Crosscurrents
- Paul Motian: The Story of Maryam
- Keith Tippett: A Loose Kite In A Gentle Wind
- Dave Holland: Seeds of Time
- James Williams: Alter Ego
- Andy Laverne: Liquid Silver
- Bobby McFerrin: The Voice
- Chick Corea and Steve Kujala: Voyage
- Chick Corea: Children's Songs
- Herbie Hancock: Sound-System
- Wynton Marsalis: Hot House Flowers
- Branford Marsalis: Scenes in the City
- Sonny Rollins: Sunny Days, Starry Nights
- Ron Carter and Jim Hall: Telephone
- Weather Report: Domino Theory
- Jane Ira Bloom and Fred Hersch: As One
- Fred Hersch: Horizons
- Bill Frisell: Rambler
- Bill Frisell and Vernon Reid: Smash & Scatteration
- Art Blakey and the Jazz Messengers: New York Scene
- Benny Golson: Nostalgia
- Art Farmer and Lionel Hampton: In Concert
- Art Farmer and Slide Hampton: In Concert
- Clare Fischer: Crazy Bird
- Martial Solal: Plays Hodeir
- Anthony Braxton: Prag 1984 (Quartet Performance)
- Pat Metheny Group: First Circle
- John Abercrombie: Night
- Jack De Johnette: Album Album
- Kenny Garrett: Introducing Kenny Garrett
- Mal Waldron and David Friesen: Encounters
- Lee Konitz: Wild at Springtime
- Art Ensemble of Chicago: The Third Decade
- Pat Metheny: Rejoicing
- Kenny Wheeler: Double, Double You
- George Duke: Rendezvous
- Miles Davis: Decoy
- Hugh Masekela: Techno-Bush

== Deaths ==
January

- 10 – Thore Jederby, Swedish upright bassist, record producer, and radio broadcaster (born 1913).

February

- 19 – Claude Hopkins, American stride pianist and bandleader (born 1903).

March

- 7 – Ethel Azama, American singer (born 1934).

April

- 3 – John Mehegan, Kjeld Bonfils, American jazz pianist, lecturer, and critic (born 1916).
- 13 – George Fierstone, English drummer (born 1916).
- 20 – Mabel Mercer, English-born cabaret singer (born 1900).
- 23
  - Red Garland, American pianist, band leader, and composer (born 1923).
  - Juan Tizol, Puerto Rican trombonist and composer (born 1900).
- 26 – Count Basie, American pianist, organist band leader, and composer (born 1904).

May

- 18 – Ray Copeland, American trumpeter and teacher (born 1926).

June

- 26 – Dill Jones, Welsh jazz stride pianist (born 1923).
- 26 – Albert Dailey, American pianist (born 1939).

July

- 5 – Don Elliott, American trumpeter, vibraphonist, and vocalist (born 1926).
- 14 – Bill Stapleton, American trumpeter and arranger (born 1945).
- 24 – Frank Butler, American drummer (born 1928).

August

- 7 – Esther Phillips, American singer (born 1935).
- 12 – Lenny Breau, American guitarist and music educator (born 1941).

September

- 10
  - Herman Sherman, American saxophonist and bandleader (born 1923).
  - Trummy Young, African-American trombonist (born 1912).
- 26 – Shelly Manne, American drummer (born 1920).

October

- 13 – Kjeld Bonfils, Danish pianist and vibraphonist (born 1918).
- 16 – Jiří Jelínek, Czech painter, illustrator, jazz trumpeter, and singer (born 1922).
- 17 – Alberta Hunter, American singer and songwriter (born 1895).
- 20 – Budd Johnson, American saxophonist and clarinetist (born 1910).
- Ronnie Ball, English pianist, composer, and arranger (born 1927).

November

- 16 – Vic Dickenson, American trombonist (born 1906).

December

- 8 – Gene Ramey, jazz musician (born 1913).
- 15 – Eddie Beal, American pianist (born 1910).

Unknown date

- Elmon Wright, American trumpeter (born 1929).

== Births ==
January

- 4 – Trond Bersu, Norwegian drummer.
- 5 – Shinya Fukumori, Japanese drummer and composer.
- 19 – Yvonnick Prene, French harmonica player and composer.
- 24 – Jason Nazary, American drummer.
- 28 – David Helbock, Austrian pianist and composer

February

- 20 – Mari Kvien Brunvoll, Norwegian singer and composer.
- 23 – Lucia Cadotsch, Swiss singer and composer.

March

- 4 – Sheila Permatasaka, Indonesian bassist.

April

- 4 – Steinar Aadnekvam, Norwegian jazz guitarist.
- 26 – Andrea Rydin Berge, Norwegian singer and pianist.

May

- 16 – Zara McFarlane, Jamaican-British singer and songwriter.
- 28 – Obenewa, English singer-songwriter and multi-instrumentalist.
- 29 – Jo Berger Myhre, Norwegian upright bassist, Splashgirl.

June

- 18 – Frida Ånnevik, Norwegian singer.
- 21 – David Lyttle, Northern Irish musician, songwriter, producer, composer, and record label owner.

July

- 8 – Jo Skaansar, Norwegian upright bassist and composer.

August

- 10 – Cyrille Aimée, French singer.
- 14 – Kristoffer Kompen, Norwegian trombonist and composer.
- 18 – John Escreet, English pianist and composer.
- 25 – Linda Oh, Australian bassist and composer.

September

- 16 – Katie Melua, Georgian-British singer, songwriter and musician.

October

- 17 – Anja Eline Skybakmoen, Norwegian singer and composer, Pitsj.
- 18 – Esperanza Spalding, American bassist, vocalist, and composer.
- 19 – Thundercat, American bassist, singer, and composer.
- 24 – Fredrika Stahl, Swedish singer and songwriter.
- 29 – Anthony Strong, English singer, pianist, and songwriter.

November

- 29 – Sitti Navarro, Filipino bossa nova singer.

December

- 27 – Jørgen Mathisen, Norwegian saxophonist and clarinetist.

== See also ==
- 1980s in jazz
- List of years in jazz
- 1984 in music
