= October 8 (disambiguation) =

October 8 is the 281st day of the year (282nd in leap years) in the Gregorian calendar.

October 8 may also refer to:

- October 8 (Eastern Orthodox liturgics)
- 8th October Revolutionary Movement
- October H8TE, a 2025 documentary film alternately titled October 8
- "Huit Octobre 1971", an extensively sampled song by Cortex from their 1975 album Troupeau Bleu
