= 1910 in jazz =

- Decade: 1910s in jazz
- Music: 1910 in music
- Standards: List of pre-1920 jazz standards
- See also: 1909 in jazz – 1911 in jazz

This is a timeline documenting events of Jazz in the year 1910.

== Events ==
- Violinist, pianist, composer and conductor James Reese Europe founds the Clef Club, an association for Black musicians based in New York.

== Births ==
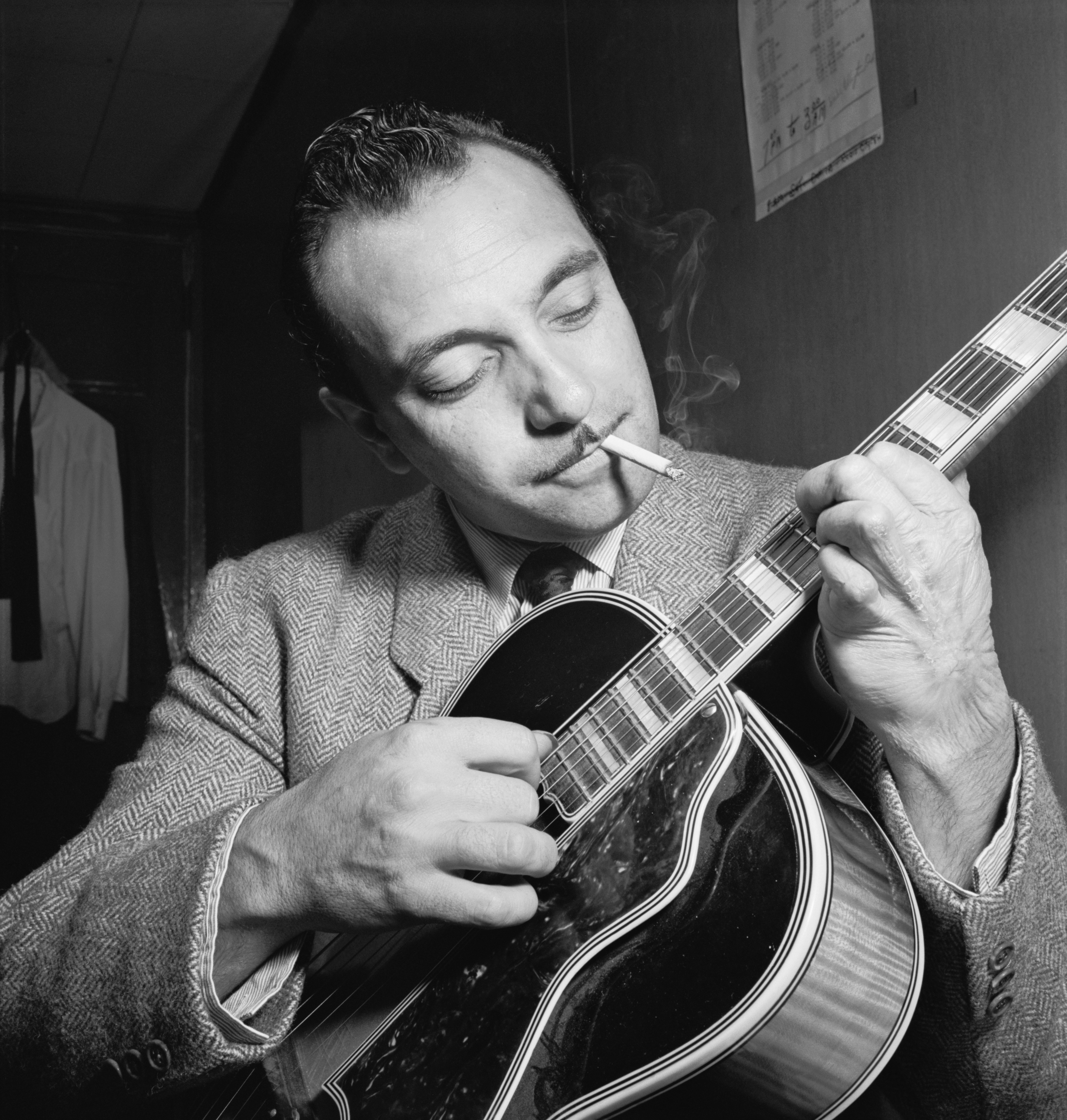
Django Reinhardt

January

- 2 – Minoru Matsuya, Japanese pianist (died 1995).
- 14 – Jimmy Crawford, American drummer (died 1980).
- 17 – Sid Catlett, American drummer (died 1951).
- 23 – Django Reinhardt, Belgian-born, Romani French jazz guitarist and composer (died 1953).
- 27 – Charlie Holmes, American alto jazz saxophonist of the swing era (died 1985).

February

- 21 – Al Sears, American tenor saxophonist and bandleader (died 1990).

March

- 6 – Arthur Österwall, Swedish band leader, composer, vocalist, and upright bassist (died 1990).

April

- 1 — Harry Carney, American saxophonist (died 1974).
- 16 – Boyce Brown, American dixieland alto saxophonist (died 1959).
- 28 – Everett Barksdale, American guitarist (died 1986).

May

- 8 — Mary Lou Williams, American pianist, composer, and singer (died 1981).
- 12 – Jack Jenney, American jazz trombonist (died 1945).
- 23 – Artie Shaw, American clarinetist, composer, bandleader, and actor (died 2004).
- 25 – Pha Terrell, American singer (died 1945).
- 28 – T-Bone Walker, American guitarist, singer, songwriter and multi-instrumentalist (died 1975).

June

- 7 — Gene Porter American saxophonist and clarinetist (died 1993).
- 13 – Eddie Beal, American pianist (died 1984).
- 15 – Stan Wrightsman, American pianist (died 1975).
- 18 – Ray McKinley, American drummer, singer, and bandleader (died 1995).
- 23 – Milt Hinton, American double bassist, (died 2000).

July

- 18 – Lou Busch, American pianist, arranger and composer, a.k.a. Joe "Fingers" Carr (died 1979).

August

- 7 — Freddie Slack, American pianist, composer, and bandleader (died 1965).
- 8 — Lucky Millinder, African-American bandleader (died 1966).

September

- 12 – Shep Fields, American bandleader, clarinetist, and tenor saxophonist (died 1981).

October

- 10 – Milt Larkin, American trumpeter and bandleader (died 1996).
- 24 – Stella Brooks, American singer (died 2002).

November

- 25 – Willie Smith, American saxophonist, clarinetist, and singer (died 1967).

December

- 7 — Louis Prima, Italian-American singer, songwriter, bandleader, and trumpeter (died 1978).
- 14 – Budd Johnson, American saxophonist and clarinetist (died 1984).
- 17 — Sy Oliver, American arranger, trumpeter, composer, singer and bandleader (died 1988).
- 23 – Freddy Gardner, British saxophonist (died 1950).
- 26 – Rupert Nurse, Trinidadian-British pianist, upright bassist, and saxophonist (died 2001).
