= 1945 in jazz =

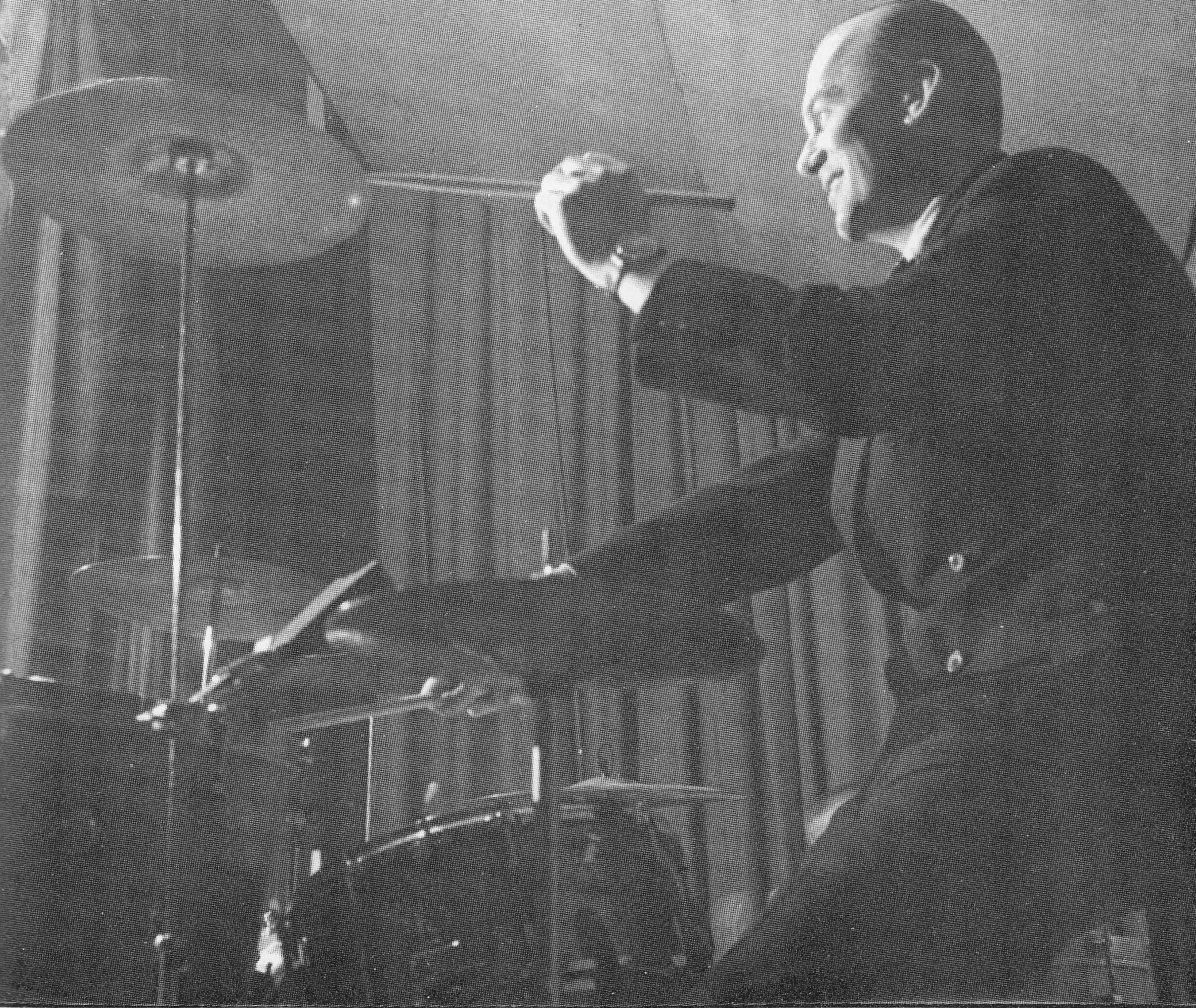
- Finnish drummer Ossi Aalto
- Decade: 1940s in jazz
- Music: 1945 in music
- Standards: List of 1940s jazz standards
- See also: 1944 in jazz – 1946 in jazz

This is a timeline documenting events of jazz in the year 1945.

== Events ==
- Miles Davis has graduated from high school. He goes to New York and becomes a musician. He enrolls in Juilliard at his parents' request.
- John Coltrane was drafted and plays clarinet with the Navy Band in Hawaii.

== Album releases ==
- Mary Lou Williams: Zodiac Suite (1945)
- John Serry Sr.: Leone Jump for Sonora Records (catalogue # 3001 B) with the Biviano Accordion & Rhythm Sextette

== Deaths ==
March

- 10 – Josef Taussig, Czech trombonist and journalist (born 1914).

April

- 25 – Teddy Weatherford, American pianist, an accomplished stride pianist (born 1903).

August

- 5 – Nat Jaffe, American pianist (born 1918).

October

- 7 – Erhard Bauschke, German reedist and bandleader (born 1912).
- 14 – Pha Terrell, American singer (born 1910).

December

- 8 – Richard M. Jones, American pianist, composer, band leader, and record producer (born 1892).
- 16 – Jack Jenney, American trombonist (born 1910).
- 29 – Bobby Stark, American trumpeter (born 1906).

== Births ==
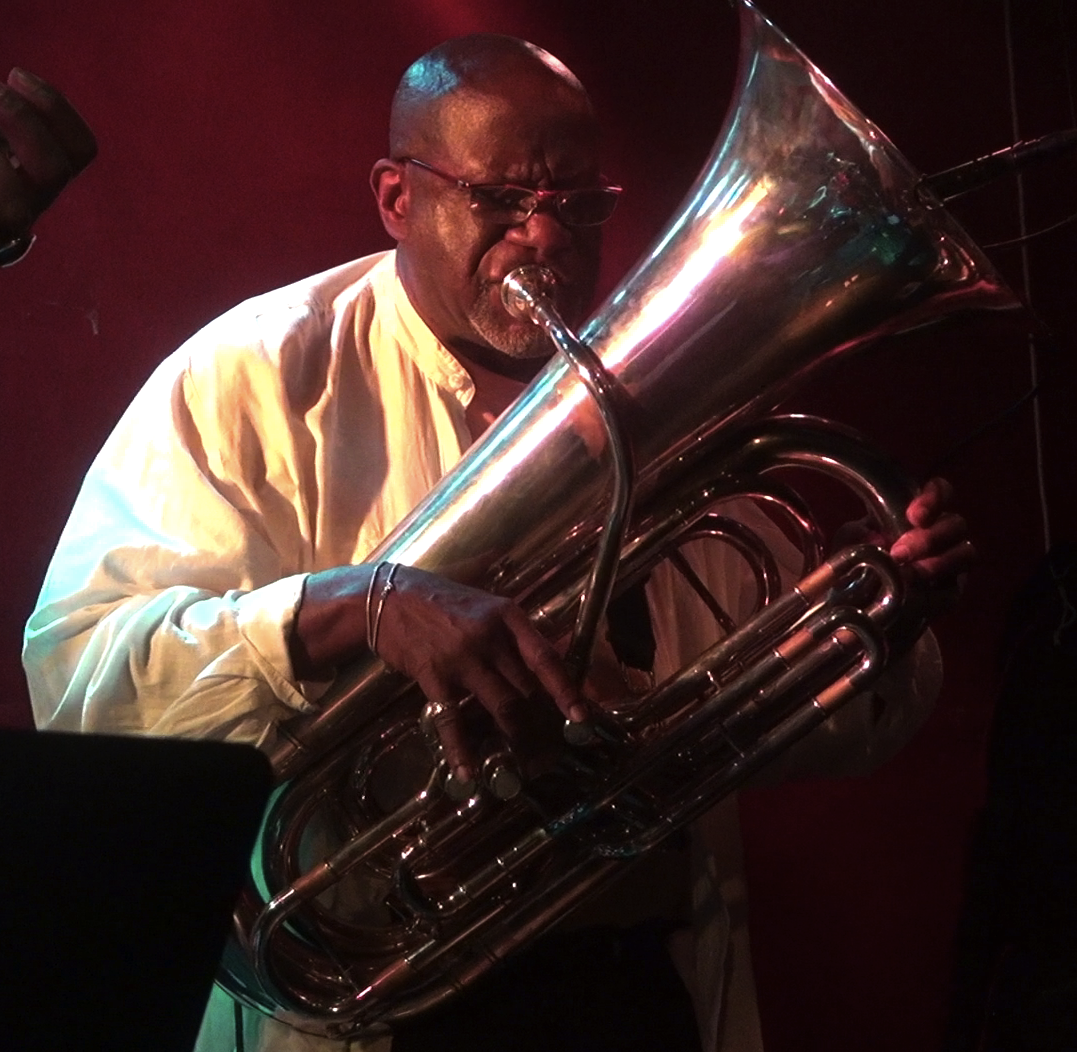
Bob Stewart in New York City.

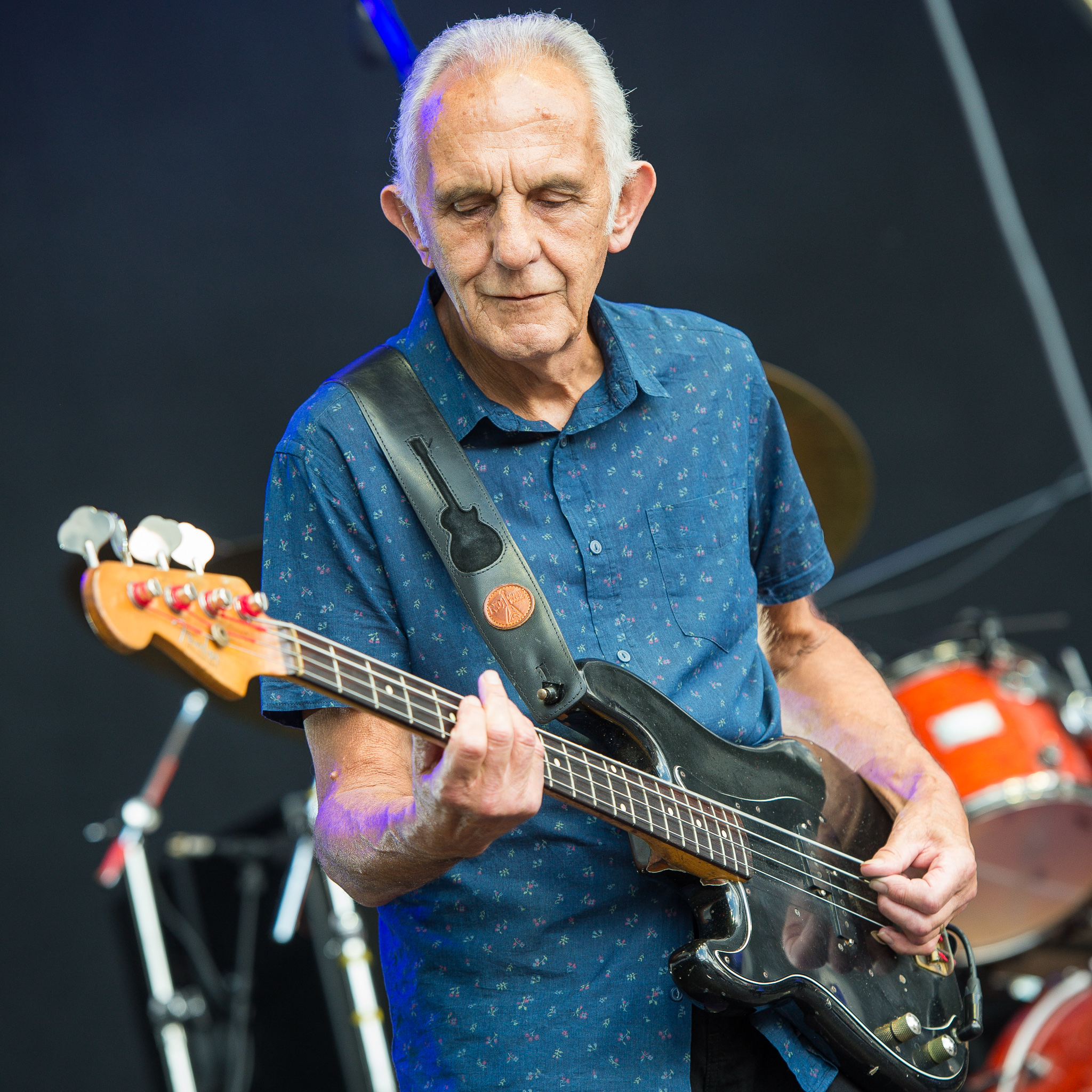
Colin Hodgkinson in 2015.

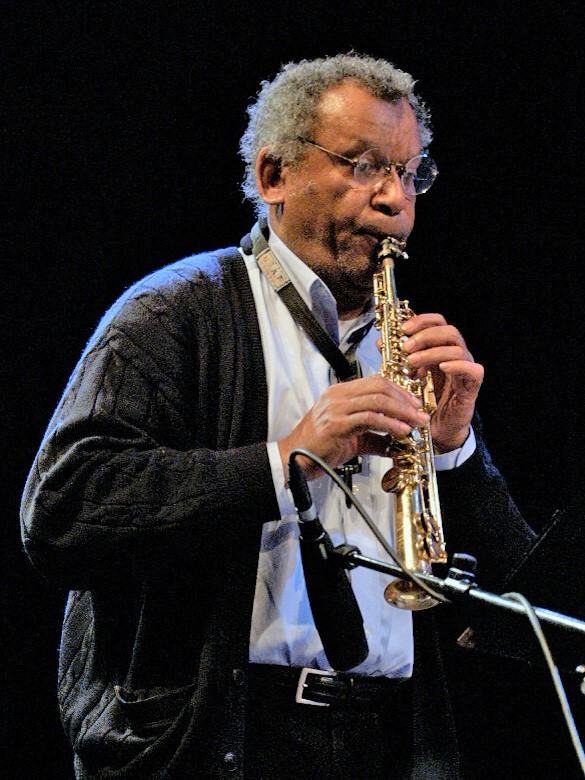
Anthony Braxton

January

- 2 – Terje Bjørklund, Norwegian pianist and composer.
- 15 – Bob Maize, American upright bassist (died 2004).
- 27 – Henri Texier, French upright bassist.

February

- 3 – Bob Stewart, American tubist.
- 4 – John Stubblefield, American saxophonist, flautist, and oboist (died 2005).
- 6 – Ernie Krivda, American saxophonist.
- 13 – Keith Nichols, English multi-instrumentalist.
- 15 – Edward Vesala, Finnish drummer (died 1999).
- 16 – Pete Christlieb, American tenor saxophonist.
- 21 – Akira Sakata, Japanese saxophonist.
- 24
  - Kaj Backlund, Finnish trumpeter, composer, arranger, and bandleader (died 2013).
  - Steve Berrios, American drummer and percussionist (died 2013).

March

- 17 – Elis Regina, Brazilian singer (died 1982).
- 21 – Ed Soph, American drummer and educator.
- 23 – David Grisman, American mandolinist.

April

- 1 – Bjørnar Andresen, Norwegian bassist (died 2004).
- 4 – Leszek Żądło, Polish saxophonist, flautist, composer, and university teacher.
- 9 – Steve Gadd, American drummer.
- 12 – Doug Riley, Canadian pianist (died 2007).
- 19 – Ole Kock Hansen, Danish pianist and composer.
- 22 – Demetrio Stratos, Greek lyricist and multi-instrumentalist (died 1979).
- 25 – Halvard Kausland, Norwegian guitarist (died 2017).
- 27 – Dominic Duval, American bassist (died 2016).
- 29 – Hugh Hopper, British bass guitarist (died 2009).

May

- 2 – Bob Rockwell, American saxophonist.
- 4 – Bill Stapleton, American trumpeter and arranger (died 1984).
- 8 – Keith Jarrett, American pianist and composer.
- 13 – Lou Marini, American saxophonist, arranger and composer.
- 16 – Michael Moore, American bassist.
- 24 – Terry Callier, American guitarist and singer-songwriter (died 2012).

June

- 3 – Bjørn Alterhaug, Norwegian bassist, arranger, and composer.
- 4 – Anthony Braxton, American composer, saxophonist, clarinettist, flautist, and pianist.
- 6 – Tom Coppola, American pianist and arranger.
- 9 – Mick Goodrick, American guitarist.
- 28 – Magni Wentzel, Norwegian singer and guitarist.

July

- 3 – Thomas Mapfumo, Zimbabwean singer.
- 11 – Vaughn Wiester, American musician and educator.
- 12 – Bernard Lubat, French drummer, pianist, singer, percussionist, vibraphonist, and accordionist.
- 13 – Josef Vejvoda, Czech composer, percussionist, conductor and bandleader.
- 29 – Joe Beck, American guitarist (died 2008).
- 30 – David Sanborn, American alto saxophonist.

August

- 14 – Eliana Pittman, Brazilian singer.
- 19 – Brian Godding, American guitarist.
- 21 – Takehiro Honda, Japanese pianist (died 2006).
- 22 – Sylvia Vrethammar, Swedish singer.
- 24 – Bryan Spring or Brian Spring, British drummer.
- 28 – Victor Assis Brasil, Brazilian saxophonist (died 1981).
- 29 – Trevor Richards, English drummer.

September

- 2 – Svein Finnerud, Norwegian pianist (died 2000).
- 4 – Danny Gatton, American guitarist (died 1994).
- 10 – Harry Pepl, Austrian guitarist (died 2005).
- 27 – Peter Ecklund, American cornetist.
- 28 – Murray Wall, Australian upright bassist.

October

- 5
  - Geoff Leigh, English saxophonist and flautist.
  - George Finola, American cornetist (died 2000).
- 8 – John Betsch, American drummer.
- 14 – Colin Hodgkinson, British bass guitarist.
- 19 – Carol Kidd, Scottish singer.
- 23 – Ernie Watts, American saxophonist.
- 27 – Arild Andersen, Norwegian upright bassist.
- 28 – Elton Dean, English saxophonist (died 2006).

November

- 3 – Mark Kramer, American pianist and composer.
- 10 – John LaBarbera, American trumpeter and arranger.
- 13 – Knut Riisnæs, Norwegian saxophonist.
- 26 – Jim Mullen, Scottish guitarist.
- 27 – Randy Brecker, American trumpeter and flugelhorn player, Brecker Brothers.
- 30 – Johnny Dyani, South African upright bassist and pianist (died 1986).

December

- 12 – Tony Williams, American drummer (died 1997).
- 15 – Kimiko Kasai, Japanese singer.
- 21 – Cameron Brown, American upright bassist.
- 28 – Daniel Carter, American saxophonist, flautist, clarinetist, and trumpeter.

Unknown date

- Johnny "Dandy" Rodriguez Jr, American percussionist.
- Mongezi Feza, South African trumpeter and flautist (died 1975).
- Steve Gregory, English saxophonist, flautist, and composer.

== See also ==
- 1940s in jazz
- List of years in jazz
- 1945 in music

== Bibliography ==
- The New Real Book, Volume I. Sher Music. 1988. ISBN 0-9614701-4-3.
- The New Real Book, Volume II. Sher Music. 1991. ISBN 0-9614701-7-8.
- The New Real Book, Volume III. Sher Music. 1995. ISBN 1-883217-30-X.
- The Real Book, Volume I (6th ed.). Hal Leonard. 2004. ISBN 0-634-06038-4.
- The Real Book, Volume II (2nd ed.). Hal Leonard. 2007. ISBN 978-1-4234-2452-9.
- The Real Book, Volume III (2nd ed.). Hal Leonard. 2006. ISBN 0-634-06136-4.
- The Real Jazz Book. Warner Bros. ISBN 978-91-85041-36-7.
- The Real Vocal Book, Volume I. Hal Leonard. 2006. ISBN 0-634-06080-5.
