= Obenewa =

- Born: 28 May 1984 (age 42); Hammersmith, West London, England
- Genres: Soul
- Occupation: Singer
- Instrument: Piano
- Years active: 2006–present
- Labels: Aus Music, 2020Vision
- Website: obenewa.com

Obenewa (born 28 May 1984) is an English singer-songwriter and multi-instrumentalist. She was classically trained on piano from the age of four and picked up the guitar in her teens.

== Music career ==
On 27 February 2011, Obenewa released her debut EP "Once upon a time …" The track "Put Yourself in My Shoes" was shortlisted as BBC 1Xtra's 100% HomeGrown 'Unsigned Track of the Week' and received airplay on BBC Radio 1Xtra and BBC Radio 1.

In 2014 Obenewa featured on Huxley's album Blurred on the track "Road Runner" which was released on Will Saul's Aus Music imprint. She also featured on Walter Ego's "CTRL + ALT + DEL" EP on 2020Vision, which received airplay from Annie Mac and Toddla T on BBC Radio 1 and Giles Peterson on BBC Radio 6 Music .

The track "Bad News" by Embody featuring Obenewa has been played by Pete Tong on BBC Radio 1.

Obenewa's talent has led her to share the stage with artists like Raphael Saadiq, Anthony Hamilton and Marsha Ambrosius.

== Discography ==
=== EPs ===
- "Once upon a time..."

=== As guest ===
- Huxley feat. Obenewa - "Road Runner" (Will Saul AUS Music)
- Walter Ego - "CTRL + ALT + DEL" (2020Vision)
- Embody feat. Obenewa - "Bad News"
