= George Finola =

American jazz cornetist (1945–2000)

- Born: 5 October 1945
- Died: 1 December 2000 (aged 55)
- Genres: Dixieland; jazz; swing
- Instrument: Cornet
- Years active: 1965–2000

George A. Finola (5 October 1945 – 1 December 2000) was an American jazz cornetist.

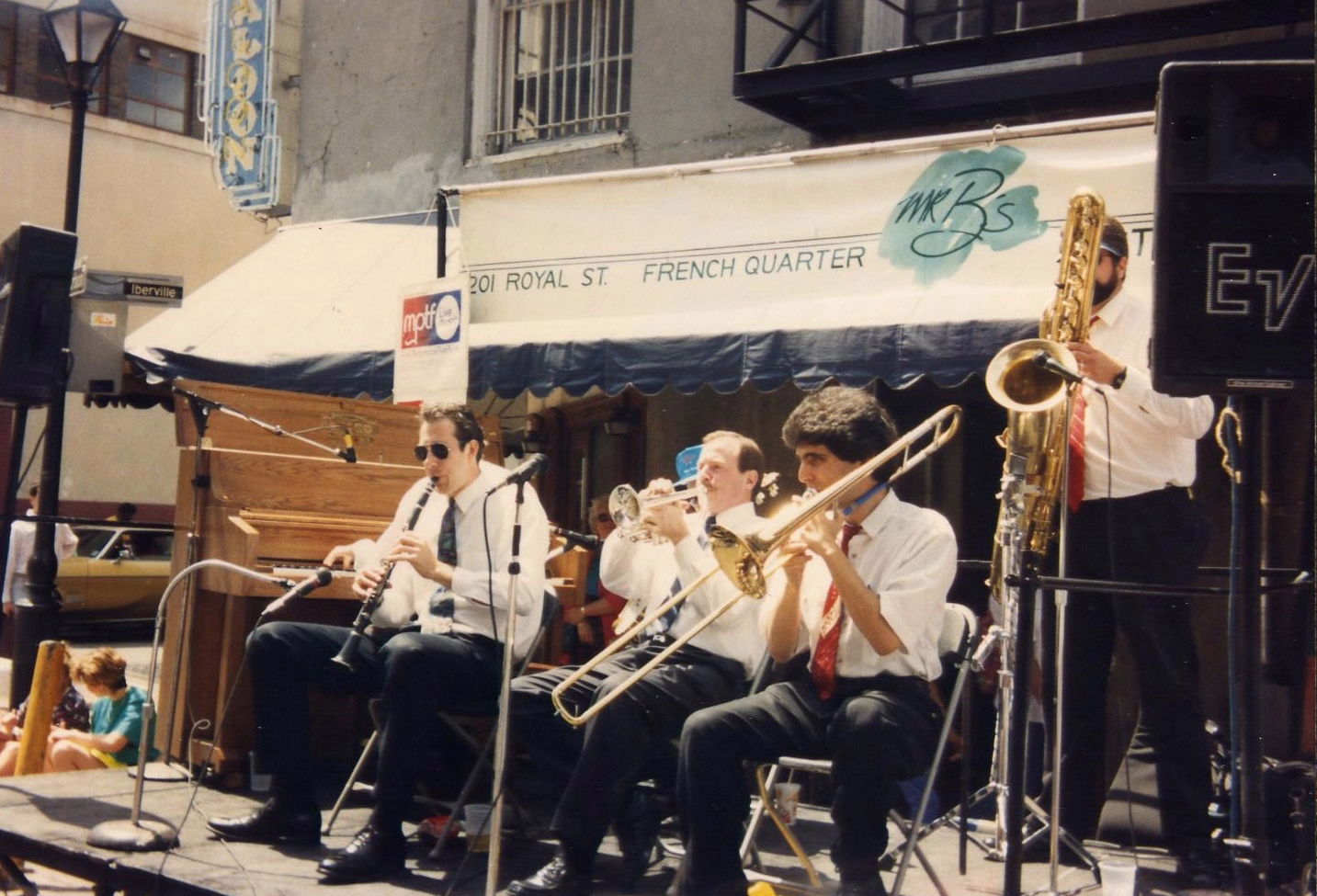
Finola (center) on cornet leading a band at French Quarter Festival 1993

== Biography ==
Finola played professionally in New Orleans, playing gigs and advancing jazz scholarships most of his life and was an attraction. He founded the Jazz Institute of Chicago and was among the organizers of the first New Orleans Jazz Festival in 1965. He released his debut album Jazz Of The Chosen Few in 1965, where he is paired with notable musicians like Paul Crawford, Raymond Burke, Armand Hug, Danny and Blue Lu Barker.

== Discography (in selection) ==
- 1965: Jazz Of The Chosen Few (Continental Recording And Sound Productions - JM-65-4)
- 1975: No Words, Just George (Meiersdorff Record Productions - MRP1)
- 1976: New Orleans After Hours (Maison Bourbon - MB 4)
