= Michael Magalon =

- Birth name: Michael Magalon
- Born: 24 August 1975 (age 49); Ougrée, Belgium
- Genres: Jazz
- Occupation(s): Musician, composer, club manager
- Instrument(s): Bass, guitar
- Years active: 1993–
- Website: michaelmagalon.com

Michael Magalon (born 24 August 1975) is a Belgian jazz bassist, guitarist, and composer.

== Biography ==
Magalon started playing classical guitar at 12. At 18, he composed the music for the play Couleur de Femmes by Jacques Henrard adapted by Marc Gooris] (1993).

After gaining experience with a number of bands Magalon studied at the Jazz Studio] in Antwerp. Later, he started to play the bass influenced by the modern jazz band Aka Moon and the bassist Michel Hatzigeorgiou.

Magalon has worked with Belgian jazz musicians such as Jeroen Van Herzeele, Bart Defoort, Stephane Mercier, Dominic Ntoumos and musicians from rock and funk like Rudy Lenners (Scorpions), Rudy Trouvé (dEUS, Kiss My Jazz, Dead Man Ray), and Nick Van Gelder.

In 2007, Magalon performed at the MIDEM of Cannes in France with his drumless trio featuring Stephane Mercier on saxophone and Georges Hermans on piano.

In 2008 Magalon decided to take a break from playing professionally, only to experiment with the other side of music, working as manager for the Engine Room Club in South East England. He welcomed bands like the Germs, Hed PE, The Addicts, inMe, Discharge, Acid Mothers Temple, Death Angel.
