= Miriam Aïda =

Swedish jazz singer (born 1974)

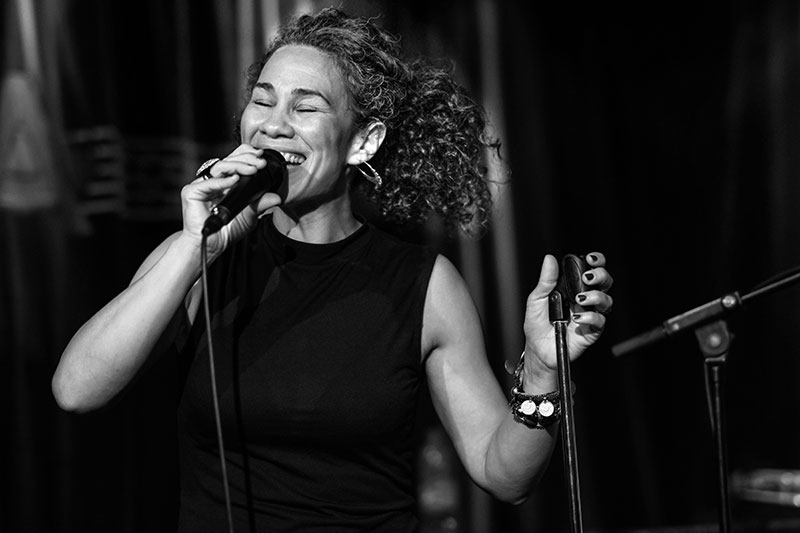
Miriam Aïda at A-Train club in Berlin 2018

Miriam Sarghini Aïda (born 24 September 1974) is a Swedish jazz singer.

She has toured internationally, performing at the Blue Note in Tokyo, in London, Paris, Istanbul, Moscow, Helsinki, Oslo, Palermo, Berlin and across Sweden. She has appeared on Swedish national television.

Aïda's music is influenced by many musical traditions, including Latin American, and she attained success with a Brazilian music-inspired album Meu Brasil.

In 2017, she sang Brazilian music at the Uppsala International Guitar Festival in Sweden.

== Discography ==
- 2005 Meu Brasil (Connective)
- 2006 Introduction (Sony/Columbia)
- 2007 My Kind of World (Connective)
- 2008 Come on Home (Connective)
- 2009 Letras Ao Brasil (Connective)
- 2011 Visans väsen (Connective)
- 2014 É de lei! (Connective)
- 2015 Quatro Janelas (Connective)
- 2019 Loving The Alien (Connective)
