= Will Saul =

British DJ

- Born: 28 December 1978 (age 46)
- Origin: Glastonbury, England
- Genres: Electronica; house
- Occupation(s): Disc jockey Record producer Record label owner
- Website: http://www.simplerecords.co.uk

Will Saul (born 28 December 1978 in Glastonbury, England) is a British DJ, music producer, and the founder of Simple Records and Aus Music.

== Career ==
Will Saul started his first record label, Simple Records, in 2003, after having worked at Sony International’s A&R department for two years. He learned about house and techno while at Koobla Records and Phonica. Simple Records releases house music by artists such as Saul, Sideshow, Vector Lovers, Marc Romboy, and Motorcitysoul.

February 2005 saw the release of Simple One, a compilation that encapsulated the label's sound. In the early summer of the same year, Saul followed with the release of his debut artist album Space Between, a soulful and melodic work geared towards home listening rather than the dance floor.

Saul started the record label Aus Music in 2006 with Sideshow (Fink on Ninja Tune). Aus Music explores the more experimental side of house, techno, dub, and downtempo, with releases from artists such as Motorcitysoul, Lee Jones, Martyn, Appleblim, Ramadanman, Joy Orbison, Shur-I-Kan and Midland.

Additionally, Saul has operated as an A&R producer. In 2009, Saul released a three-disc contribution to the EQ Recordings Balance series. Saul was also a resident at the London club The End for many years before it closed in January 2009. He contributed to BBC Radio 1's Essential Mix series on 27 April 2013.

Since 2015, Saul has served as A&R for !K7's DJ-Kicks series, beginning with Actress' entry to the series in May, and continuing with entries by DJ Koze, Seth Troxler, Moodymann, Dam-Funk, Jackmaster, Marcel Dettmann, and Daniel Avery that received praise from critics and audiences.

== Discography ==
=== Original productions ===
- Will Saul & Tam Cooper – "Hi-Lo / Room In Your Heart" (2011)
- Will Saul & Mike Monday – "Sequence 1" EP – Aus Music (2010)
- Will Saul Feat. Ursula Rucker – "Where Is It"’– Simple (2009)
- Will Saul & Tam Cooper – "Through The Smoke" – Systematic (2009)
- Will Saul & Tam Cooper – "In & Out/3000AD" – Simple (2009)
- Will Saul & Mike Monday – "Zippo" – Buzzin’ Fly (2009)
- Will Saul & Tam Cooper – "Teddy’s Back" – Simple (2009)
- Will Saul & Tam Cooper – "Tech Noir" – Simple (2008)
- Will Saul & Tam Cooper – "Sequential Circus" – Simple (2007)
- Will Saul – "Pause" – Simple – (2007)
- Will Saul & Lee Jones – "Hug The Sary" – Aus (2007)
- Will Saul – "Where Is It" – Air 2006)
- Will Saul – "Jen" EP – Systematic (2006)
- Will Saul – "Animal Magic" – Simple (2005)
- Will Saul Featuring Ursula Rucker – "Tic Toc" – Simple (2005)
- Will Saul – "Mbira" – Simple (2005)
- Will Saul – "Space Between" (album) – Simple (2005)
- Will Saul – "Malfunction" – Simple (2004)
- Will Saul – "I Got Rhythm" – 10 Kilo (2004)
- Will Saul – "Digital Watch" – Simple (2004)
- Will Saul – "Cliff" – Simple (2003)
- Will Saul – "Fast Lane" – Simple (2003)

=== Mix compilations ===
- Will Saul – "Will Saul - DJ Kicks" – DJ Kicks (2014)
- Will Saul – "Balance 015" – EQ Recordings (2009)
- Will Saul/Various Artists – "All Night Long Mix" – Aus Music (2009)
- Will Saul – "Simple One" – Simple (2005)
- Will Saul – "Simple Sounds Vol 3" – Simple (2004)
- Will Saul – "Simple Sounds Vol 2" – Simple (2003)
- Will Saul versus Sideshow– "Simple Sounds Vol 1"– Simple (2003)
