= Niki King =

Scottish singer and songwriter

Nikki King
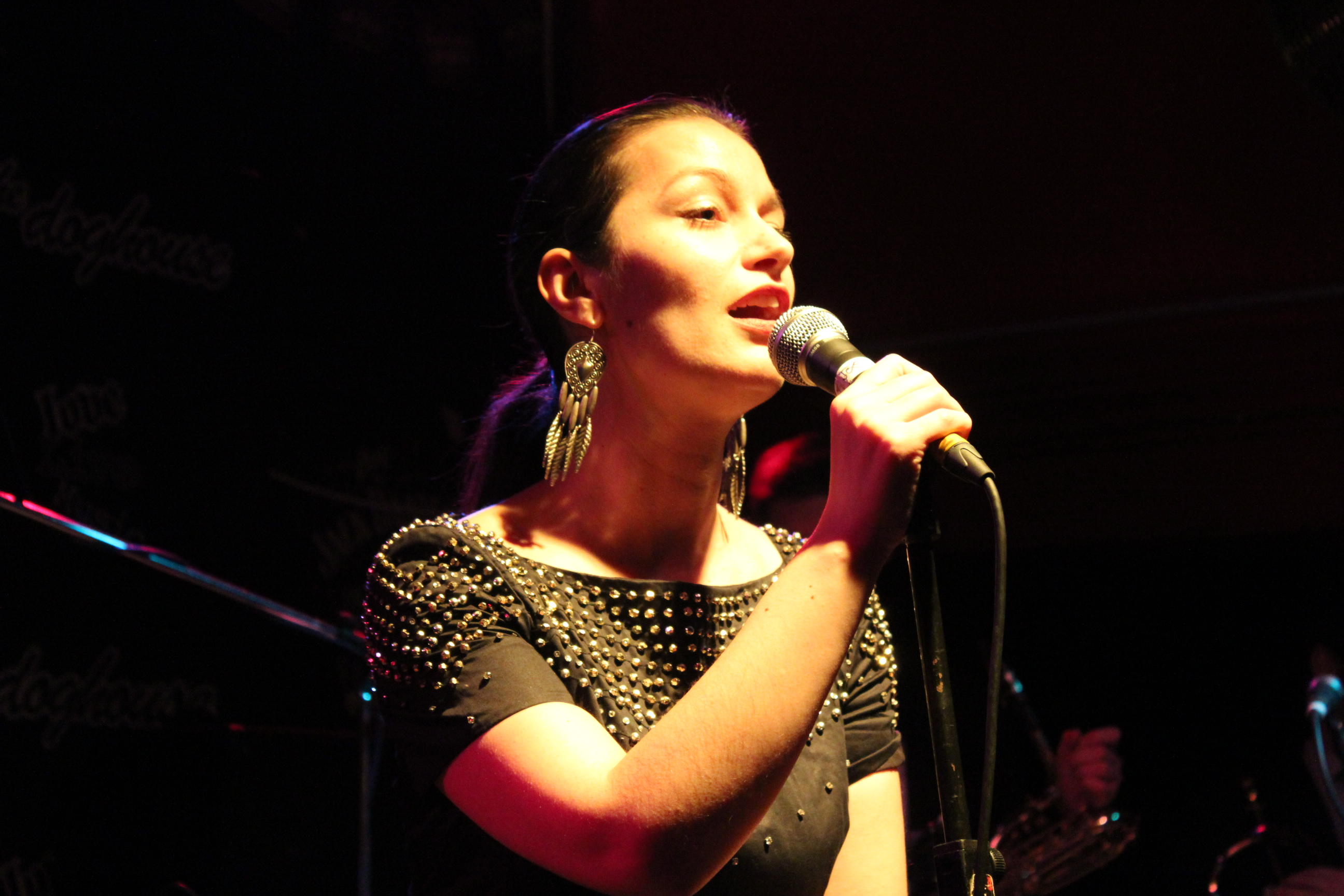
- Born: Edinburgh, United Kingdom
- Website: https://www.nikiking.com/

Niki King is a Scottish singer and songwriter. Her accolades include winning the UK Perrier Jazz Vocalist Award, The Scottish Style Award and The Spirit Of Scotland Music Medal.

Currently King is in the studio her sixth studio album, due for release in 2023.
