= Victor Kunonga =

- Born: Victor Kunonga; October 25, 1974 (age 52); Selukwe, Rhodesia
- Origin: Wedza, Zimbabwe
- Genre: Afro-pop/Afro Soul
- Occupations: Composer, Singer, songwriter, artist and designer
- Years active: 2004–present
- Website: victorkunonga.com

Victor Kunonga (born October 25, 1974) is a Zimbabwean award-winning Afro-jazz singer and songwriter. Though having come to light in 2004, Victor quickly rose to fame with his first two albums and was a household name by 2007.

== Biography ==
Victor Kunonga was born in Zimbabwe's Shurugwi but grew up in the rural area of Hwedza. Victor's family later moved to live in the country's second largest city of Bulawayo and later to the capital city Harare, where he discovered his dormant musical talent.

Self-taught acoustic guitarist, he announced his arrival on the Zimbabwe music scene in 2004 with the launch of his debut album Such Is Life – Ndanyengetedzwa (Persuaded). Since then Victor's star has risen and he has firmly established himself as one of the leading Zimbabwean artists.

== Musical career ==
In 1999, his dream of enrolling with the college of music in Bulawayo was shattered when he was told he ought to have an instrument or two to be accepted by the college. Since he did not have one it only followed that he failed to enrol. He then moved to Harare to join a designing interest having completed a commercial designing course majoring in graphics. In the early half of 2001 Victor started attending music workshops at the college of music in Harare where he first handled a guitar to learn how to play the strings for the first time.

Victor derives inspiration from the masters of Zimbabwean music namely Oliver Mtukudzi, Thomas Mapfumo, Louis Mhlanga, Chiwoniso Maraire and from general traditional rhythms. Through working with non-governmental organisations, Victor has been vocal in fighting social ills such as gender-based violence and drug abuse.

=== Debut album: Such is Life: Ndanyengetedzwa ===
His first album released in 2004, became a hit based on the songs "Maidarirei", "Ndanyengetedzwa namai" and "Tigere".

The album sold very well and music video for "Maidarirei" also did very well on Zimbabwean TV music video charts. "Such is Life: Ndanyengetedzwa" song list:

- 1. Mayidarirei
- 2. Umazenza
- 3. Usacheme
- 4. Ndanyengetedzwa
- 5. Tigere
- 6. Peace
- 7. Usacheme Mix
- 8. Mayidarirei Mix

=== Uyo ===
On Victor's second album, "Uyo", released in 2006, big names in Afro-Jazz appeared, this includes celebrated drummer, Sam Mataure, female jazz vocalist Prudence Katomeni, bassist Kelly Rusike, keyboardist Manasa Mujawo, Guitarist Zivanai Masango, percussionist Adam Chisvo, Richie Lopez on saxophone. His second offering made an equally big success on Zimbabwean music charts and is still very much popular to date. "Uyo" Song list:

- 1. Mandirasa
- 2. Kana
- 3. Kure (The Prodigal Son)
- 4. Mamurega
- 5. Munyamai
- 6. Next
- 7. Nzara
- 8. Zivanayi
- 9. Uyo

in 2010, Victor released his 3rd Album Handinete.

== Peace ==
Victor formed the group “Peace” in 2004 and since then, they have been a part of every major festival in Zimbabwe and a regular feature at premium Zimbabwe functions and Jazz clubs. Victor and Peace have also performed alongside musical greats like Oliver Mtukudzi, Steve Dyer, Malaika, Habib Coyete, Jabu Khanyile, Yvonne Chaka Chaka, Judith Sephuma, Louis Mhlanga, and Hugh Masekela. The group is known to give spirited performances at annual arts festivals like the Harare International Festival of the Arts (HIFA), the Zimbabwe Jazz Festival among others.
