= Nick Etwell =

British jazz musician

- Born: 30 May 1974 (age 51); Derby, England
- Instrument: Trumpet

Nick Etwell (born 30 May 1974) is the lead member and trumpeter of The Filthy Six, a British Jazz group.

He is originally from Derby, and was Ben Lovett's music teacher, and has also appeared with Mumford and Sons.

== Career ==
Along with drummer Chris Maas, fiddle player Tom Hobden, and trombone player Dave Williamson, he was part of the touring band for Mumford & Sons, on their mid-2015, 11-date tour of the US.
