= Vaughn Wiester =

American jazz musician and educator (born 1945)

Vaughn Wiester (born July 11, 1945) is an American jazz musician and educator. He leads his own big band, the 22-piece Famous Jazz Orchestra. The FJO plays every Monday night at the Boulevard Church Basement on Northwest Boulevard in the neighborhood of Columbus, Ohio.
