= Cortex (band) =

French rock music group

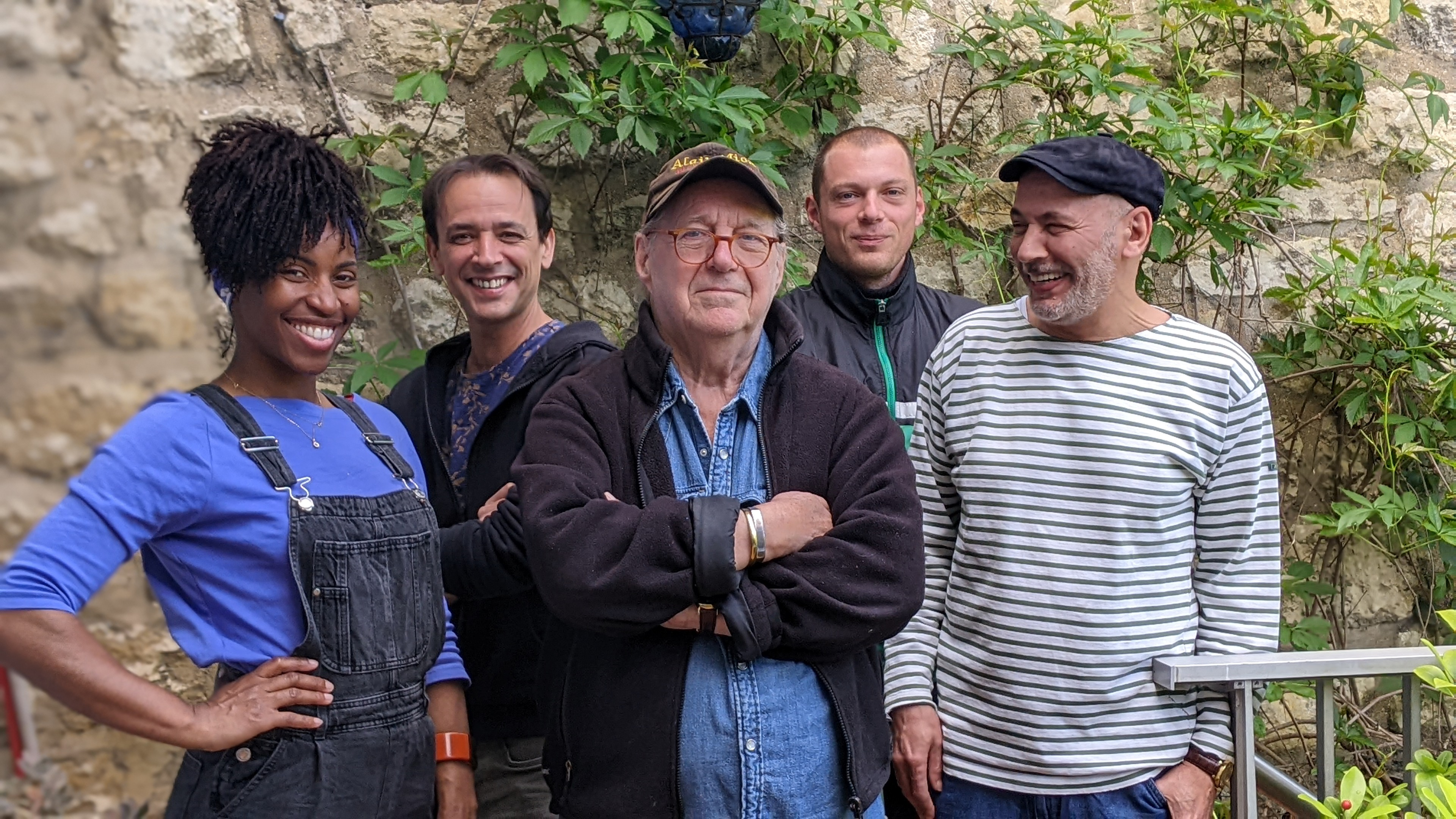
- Cortex in 2024. Virginie Hombel, Loïc Soulat, Alain Mion, Victor Dubois, and Mohamed Ouaraz. Photo by: Edija Redžić Rouseau

Background information
- Genres: French rock; jazz-funk; psychedelic rock
- Years active: 1974–1981, 2009–present
- Label: Trad Vibe Records
- Members: Alain Mion, Virginie Hombel (vocals), Mohamed Ouaraz (bass), Victor Dubois (drums), and Sandy Malonga Guth (vocals + synth)
- Past members: Alain Gandolfi, Mireille Dalbray, Alain Labib, Jeff Huttner, Jean Grevet, Adeline de Lépinay, Loïc Soulat

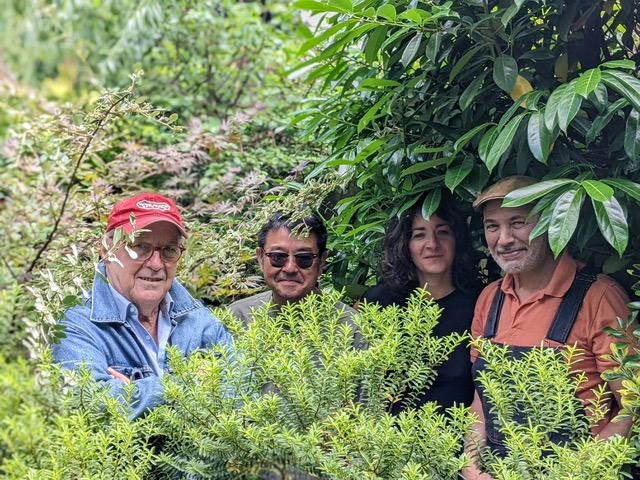
Cortex in 2023 from left to right: Alain Mion, Hidehiko Kan, Adeline de Lepinay, Mohamed Ouaraz. Photo by: Edija Redžić Rouseau

Cortex is a French jazz funk band formed by band leader Alain Mion in 1974. Cortex is known for polyrhythmic instrumentals and funk, bossa nova, samba-jazz, and psychedelic rock grooves, mixed with atmospheric vocals, inspired by 1970s American funk and jazz. Cortex broke up in 1981, but reformed in 2009 with a rotating group of members. Hip hop samples of Cortex songs in tracks from artists including MF Doom, Madlib, Tyler, the Creator, Kanye West, Flying Lotus, Lupe Fiasco, and Suicideboys have brought newfound interest to the band starting in the early 2000s.

== History ==
Cortex originally included Alain Mion (pianist, singer, composer, arranger, leader), Alain Gandolfi (drummer, percussion, vocals), Mireille Dalbray (singer), Alain Labib (alto saxophone), and Jeff Huttner, quickly replaced by Jean Grevet (bass). The band members found each other when Alain Mion responded to a poster on a bulletin board at the Centre Américain in Paris, in which a guitarist and bassist stated that they were looking for musicians to play with.

Cortex's album Troupeau Bleu was recorded in 2 days, July 15-16, 1975 at Studio Damiens, Boulogne-Billancourt (France). French singer Mireille Dalbray featured on almost all the tracks.

Cortex reunited as Alain Mion & The New Cortex in 2009 and 2010, with the singer Adeline de Lépinay taking the role of Mireille Dalbray on vocals and Hidehiko Kan on drums for performances in Europe at New Morning, Monaco’s Note Bleue, The Jazz Cafe, and Gilles Peterson’s Worldwide Winners Festival. In 2022, Cortex toured the U.S., performing at The Music Hall of Williamsburg in NYC, LODGE Room in Los Angeles, and the Desert Daze festival at the Lake Perris State Recreation Area in Riverside County, California.

In June 2024, Cortex began a North America summer tour with band members Virginie Hombel (vocals), Loïc Soulat (keyboard and alto sax), Mohamed Ouaraz (bass), and Victor Dubois (drums), entitled "Jazz is Dead", with shows at Damrosch Park at Lincoln Center in New York, NY, Howard Theatre in D.C., Revolution Hall in Portland, OR, and the Montreal International Jazz Festival.

September-October 2026, Cortex is doing a 16-city North American Tour presented by ARTDONTSLEEP and Jazz Is Dead.

== Discography ==
=== LPs ===
- Troupeau Bleu (also released as Mary & Jeff) (Disques Espérance, Trad Vibe, 1975)
- Vol. 2 (Sonodisc, Trad Vibe, 1977)
- Pourquoi (Crypto/RCA, Trad Vibe, 1978)
- Inédit '79 (includes all of I Heard A Sigh and additional material) (Underdog, 2006)
- Rare and Lost Tapes (Trad Vibe, 2023)

=== Singles ===
- Les Oiseaux Morts / Back to Life (Disques Espérance, Trad Vibe, 1976)

== Songs used in films ==
- I Heard A Sigh, theme music for the film Drone Games (White Lion Films, France)
- I Heard A Sigh, music from the film Doppelganger (Next Film - TVN S A, Poland)
- Chanson d'un Jour d'Hiver, music from the film Little Trumpet (Little Trumpet Productions, USA)
- L’Enfant Samba, music for the series Good Girls, (Universal TV, NBC, Netflix, USA)
