= Troupeau Bleu =

1975 debut studio album by Cortex

Studio album by Cortex
- Released: 1975
- Recorded: July 15–16, 1975
- Studio: Studio Damiens
- Genres: Soul; Funk; Bossa nova; Psychedelic rock
- Length: 41:03
- Label: Disques Espérance

Cortex chronology
Troupeau Bleu (1975)	Cortex, Vol.2 (1977)

Troupeau Bleu (French pronunciation: [tʁupo blø]) is the 1975 debut studio album by the French jazz funk band Cortex. The album, and in particular its ninth track "Huit Octobre 1971", has gained prominence since the Nineties due to its frequency of being sampled in hip-hop music by artists like MF Doom, Kanye West, Lupe Fiasco, $uicideboy$ and Tyler, the Creator.

== Production ==
Troupeau Bleu was recorded in two days—July 15 and 16, in 1975—at Studio Damiens in Boulogne-Billancourt in France. It was recorded by most of the band's original founding members: leader Alain Mion, Mireille Dalbray, Alain Gandolfi, and Alain Labib. Jeff Huttner, while considered a founding member, was replaced by bass player Jean Grevet for Troupeau Bleu due to "prior obligations in the United States". However, Huttner was mentioned and honored on the song "Mary et Jeff".

Opera Mundi referred to the album as a combination of soul, funk, bossa nova, and psychedelic rock and considered it a cult classic due to its unique arrangements and rhythms. Many of its songs feature "haunting vocals" from Dalbray, the original singer of Cortex, against instrumentation which Passion of the Weiss described as "toeing the line between serene and frantic". "Huit Octobre 1971" is named after the wedding anniversary between Dalbray and Mion.

== Cultural impact ==
=== Critical reception ===
Online music critic Gino Sorcinelli lauded Troupeau Bleu's "distinctive sound", stating that "All the drum hits are crisp as fuck, every piano and organ sequence is impeccable, the basslines sit perfectly in the pocket and complement each composition, and Mireille Dalbray's vocals are unbelievable... They sound like they're floating on top of each track."

Many publications have called Troupeau Bleu a cult classic. Opera Mundi lauded the album's diverse, cosmopolitan sense of genre, as well as Dalbray's vocals overlaid over the songs' instrumentation.

=== Hip-hop ===
Troupeau Bleu has enjoyed more recent, revitalized interest by hip-hop musicians and enthusiasts. In October of 2022, Rolling Stone stated "Today, Cortex can take their rightful place as a key influence on generations of rap acts." CBS News wrote that " [Troupeau Bleu]'s mix of psychedelic atmospheres, jazzy grooves built around Fender Rhodes electric piano, earthy funk and Brazilian samba achieved a special chemistry that would resonate with a future generation of hip-hop producers." When asked whether Troupeau Bleu could be considered "hip-hop's favorite jazz album", American producer-rapper Cash Cobain stated "It's not an overstatement... It's a fact." (Cobain had been a fan of Tyler, the Creator's sample of Cortex in "Odd Toddlers" from 2009 and went on to produce Lil Yachty's "Cortex"—another song sampling the band—in 2021.)

Although Cortex's activities waned by 1981, Troupeau Bleu (along with other Cortex albums) later "achieved its legendary status as an intoxicating secret weapon of rare groove DJs and later hip-hop producers." The band's newfound interest led to Mion gathering new members for Cortex in 2009, embarking on tours in the United Kingdom and the rest of Europe, and reissuing old projects while releasing new material. Mion observed that Cortex was still able to sell thousands of albums in the twenty-first century as a result. By 2022, Cortex made several stops in the United States thanks to logistical support from Ali Shaheed Muhammad (a former member of A Tribe Called Quest), Adrian Younge, and their label Jazz Is Dead. From then on, Cortex's concerts have received positive reception and turnout from hip-hop enthusiasts. At a concert tour stop at Music Hall of Williamsburg in Brooklyn on September 28, 2022, "concert-goers of all ages wearing MF DOOM memorabilia quickly filled the Brooklyn venue... Within 10 minutes, Cortex's Troupeau Bleu tees had run out." Rolling Stone also reported that Tyler, the Creator was in attendance.

=== Sampling ===
The first recorded sample of Troupeau Bleu is attributed to DJ Cam who sampled the album's title track by the same name for "Bronx Theme" in 1997. A few years later, Madlib sampled "Huit Octobre 1971" for the 2003 Jaylib album in collaboration with J Dilla, specifically for the song "No Games". Shortly after, Madlib went on to sample "Huit Octobre 1971" again for MF DOOM's "One Beer", a track initially intended for Madvillainy in 2004 but instead landed on Mm..Food from the same year. Madlib also utilized "Huit Octobre 1971" for "Mind Fusion (Intro)" for the first installment of his Mind Fusion project.

In the twenty-first century, many artists have continued to sample from Troupeau Bleu including Tyler, the Creator; Rick Ross; Lupe Fiasco; Flying Lotus; Wiz Khalifa; Baby Money; Logic; Wu-Tang Clan; and others. In 2021, Yachty sampled "Huit Octobre 1971" for "CORTEX", a song released exclusively on YouTube. In Pitchfork, writer and critic Alphonse Pierre wrote that the "best" samples of "Huit Octobre 1971" are "One Beer" by MF DOOM and "Visions" by Wiz Khalifa.

Passion of the Weiss, in an interview with Mion, reported that the website WhoSampled tracked that Cortex's albums had been sampled "164 times" as of October 2022. Specifically, Troupeau Bleu had been sampled "142 times" as of October 2022. Of the band's discography writ large, Passion of the Weiss noted that "Each has been used extensively as samples, even as group members left and joined up over the decades." Mion stated in Rolling Stone that he has always accepted contracts regarding the usage of Cortex's music for sampling purposes and has believed "all of the sampling was ultimately a good thing" even though "rap is still not necessarily his taste". (Mion, however, expressed interest in the rapper Lupe Fiasco.) Upon being asked why Cortex "has resonated with a younger generation of rap musicians", Mion stated: "People in hip-hop use a lot of soul music... [Troupeau Bleu] has soul, it's particular, it's original, and it's French... It could also be because we're geniuses."

== Personnel ==
- Alain Mion – pianist, singer, composer, arranger
- Alain Gandolfi – drummer, percussionist, singer
- Mireille Dalbray – singer
- Alain Labib – alto saxophonist
- Jean Grevet – bassist

== Track list ==
Lyrics and music by Mion unless otherwise indicated.

No.	Title	Lyrics	Music	Length
1.	"La Rue"	Gandolfi; Mion	Gandolfi; Mion	4:27
2.	"Automne (Colchiques)"	Jacqueline Claude	Francine Cockenpot	2:39
3.	"L'enfant Samba"			3:06
4.	"Troupeau Bleu"			5:03
5.	"Prélude à Go Round"			4:00
6.	"Go Round"			1:23
7.	"Chanson d'un jour d'hiver"			5:23
8.	"Mary et Jeff"			2:45
9.	"Huit Octobre 1971"			4:26
10.	"Sabbat, pt. 1"			1:01
11.	"Sabbat, pt. 2"			3:20
12.	"Sabbat, pt. 3"			0:31
13.	"Madbass"			2:53
Total length:				41:03
