= The Filthy Six =

The Filthy Six are a British jazz group encompassing funk, acid jazz, and soul jazz, involving the use of Hammond organ.

== Background ==
The group has been described as a "soulful Hammond groove" sextet. The group has been compared to the James Taylor Quartet at times.

== Career ==
In March 2016, the group released the album More Filth and went on tour to promote the album.

On 17 November 2016, the group was headlining at the Downtown GetDown on the Adams Street Commons in Tallahassee.

== Personnel ==
- Nick Etwell
- Mark Brown
- Nigel Price
- Pete Whittaker
- Dan Drury
- Simon Lea

== Discography ==
Albums
Title	Release info	Year	Notes #
Knockout!	Fat Boy Records 01	2006	Mini-Album, Limited Edition
The Filthy Six	Acid Jazz	2010	
The Fox	Acid Jazz	2012	
More Filth	Acid Jazz	2016	
