= Alain Mion =

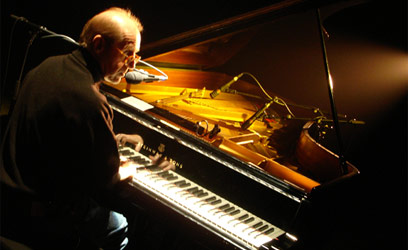

Background information
- Born: January 14, 1947 (age 79); Casablanca, Morocco
- Genres: French rock; jazz-funk; psychedelic rock; bossa nova
- Occupations: Composer; pianist; musician
- Instruments: Piano
- Years active: 1974–present
- Member of: Cortex

Alain Mion (born January 14, 1947) is a French pianist, composer, arranger, jazz singer, who serves as leader of the band Cortex.

== Musical career ==
Influenced by Bobby Timmons, Ray Charles and Les McCann, his style varies between jazz, soul jazz and "funky music".

Mion created the jazz funk group Cortex in 1974, before embarking upon a career under his own name in 1982.

Cortex's albums "Troupeau Bleu" and Volume 2 have been re-released several times and sampled by many hip-hop artists, rappers and DJs.

== Discography ==
=== With Cortex ===
- Troupeau Bleu (Sonodisc) LP
- Mary & Jeff (Sonodisc) Single
- Les Oiseaux Morts (Sonodisc) Single
- Vol. 2 (Album de Cortex) (Sonodisc) LP
- Caribou (Arabella/Wea) Single
- Pourquoi (Crypto/RCA) LP
- Meddley : Mary & Jeff-Devil's Dance (Sonodisc) Maxi
- Cuvée Spéciale (Compilation Crypto/RCA) LP
- Best of Cortex (Jazz'in/Next Music) CD
- Cortex Inédit '79 (Underdog Records) CD + digital album
- Cortex Inédit '79 "Japanese limited edition" + bonus track(Underdog Records) LP
- The Unreleased Versions : "Les Oiseaux Morts" + "Mary & Jeff" (Trad Vibe) Single

=== Under his own name ===
- Phéno-Men, T.Bones Square (Caravage/Carrere) Single
- Phéno-Men, All Along (Caravage/Carrere) Maxi
- Phéno-Men (Caravage/Carrere) LP+K7
- No'Mad, Un autre Be Bop (Olivi/Media7) Single
- No'Mad (Olivi/Media7) LP+CD
- Alain Mion in New York (Elabeth/DAM)CD
- Some Soul Food (Caravage/Jazz'in/Next Music) CD
- Alain Mion Solo CD à paraître
- Alain Mion Trio live on tour in Europe (Underdog Rec)CD
- Alain Mion & His FunKey Combo, Groovin’ in Paris (Caravage/Believe) digital album
- Alain Mion & The New Cortex "Let's Groove" (Trad Vibe Records) LP

=== Re-releases ===
- Cortex Troupeau Bleu(Pulp Flavor) CD et Vinyl
- Cortex Volume 2 (Follow Me Records/Nocturne), CD et Vinyl
- Alain Mion in New York (Jazz'in/Next Music) CD
- Some Soul Food (Ward Records Japan) CD
- Pheno-Men (Caravage/Believe) digital album
- Some Soul Food (Caravage/Believe) digital album
- Alain Mion in New York (Caravage/Believe) digital album
- Cortex Troupeau Bleu nouvelle réédition (Underdog Rec) CD + Vinyle + digital album
- Cortex Pourquoi (Trad Vibe) LP + CD + digital
- Trilogie de Cortex (Troupeau Bleu, Vol.2, Pourquoi) Trad Vibe Records/Pusher Distribution, Vinyle et CD

=== Other albums and compilations ===
- La Guêpe, Vol.1 (Pulp Flavor) CD et VinyleSavoir Faire (Plein Gaz Productions) CD et Vinyle
- Opération Heritage (Hutch Productions) Vinyle
- Sound of Music (Galaxy Music) CD
- Compilation Park Hyatt Tokyo Airflow (Milan Music/Universal)CD et Vinyle
- Compilation Nightmares on Wax "Late Night Tales" (Azuli Records), en compagnie de Quincy Jones, et Tom Scott - CD et Vinyle
- Sensations Louisiane (Warner Music) CD
- Jazz Bar 2005 (Disk Union TOKYO) CD
- French Groovy Jazz (Caravage/Believe) digital album
- French Cool Jazz (Caravage/Believe) digital album
- French Latin Jazz (Caravage/Believe) digital album
- Coffret "5 CD Gospel"(Warner Music) CD
- French Piano Jazz (Caravage/Believe) digital album
- French Organ Jazz (Caravage/Believe) digital album
- French Blue Jazz (Caravage/Believe) digital album
- Timeless, Park Hyatt Paris Vendôme (Discograph)CD
- Music for silent movies, vol. 2 (Caravage/Believe) digital album
- Modern Gospel & Negro spirituals(Caravage/Believe) digital album
