= Stan Wrightsman =

- Born: Stanley Aubrey Wrightsman; June 15, 1910; Gotebo, Oklahoma, U.S.
- Died: December 17, 1975 (aged 65) Palm Springs, California, U.S.
- Genres: Jazz
- Occupation: Musician
- Instruments: Piano, celesta

Stanley Aubrey Wrightsman (June 15, 1910 – December 17, 1975) was an American jazz pianist.

== Biography ==
Wrightsman, whose father was a musician, began playing professionally in a Gulfport, Mississippi, hotel, and in bands in Oklahoma. In 1930, he moved to New Orleans where he played with Ray Miller. From 1935–1936 he worked with Ben Pollack in Chicago. A bout of tuberculosis interrupted his career, after which he worked in California with the orchestra of Seger Ellis in 1937. His first recordings were made soon thereafter, especially with Spike Jones and his City Slickers.

In the 1940s and 1950s, Wrightsman played with various big bands and ensembles (mainly Traditional Jazz), including Artie Shaw, Wingy Manone, Eddie Miller, Rudy Vallee, Nappy Lamare, Johnny Mercer, Harry James, Bob Crosby (1950–51), Matty Matlock, Pete Fountain, The Rampart Street Paraders, Ray Bauduc, Wild Bill Davison, and Bob Scobey. He also appeared on the soundtrack of Blues in the Night (1941), in which he stood in for Richard Whorf on piano, Syncopation (1942), the Jack Webb film Pete Kelly's Blues (1955), and the Red Nichols biopic The Five Pennies (1959). In the feature film The Crimson Canary, Wrightsman appeared as a pianist.

In the 1960s, Wrightsman reunited with Pete Fountain and continued his work with Hollywood film studios. At the end of the decade, he moved to Las Vegas, where he played as a sideman for Wayne Newton and Flip Wilson. In the field of jazz, he was involved in 174 recording dates from 1937 to 1971, including sessions with Louis Armstrong, Eartha Kitt, George Van Eps, and Peggy Lee—whom he accompanied on the celesta for the song "That Old Feeling" in 1944.

In 1948, Beat Generation author Neal Cassady described Wrightsman as "a greatly underrated French player."

=== Personal life ===
wrightsman married Mittie (Fisher) Wrightsman, 1933 - divorced 1964 - 1 son Charles Stanley Wrightsman, born April 30, 1943 -
