= Jan Lundgren =

Swedish jazz pianist and composer (born 1966)

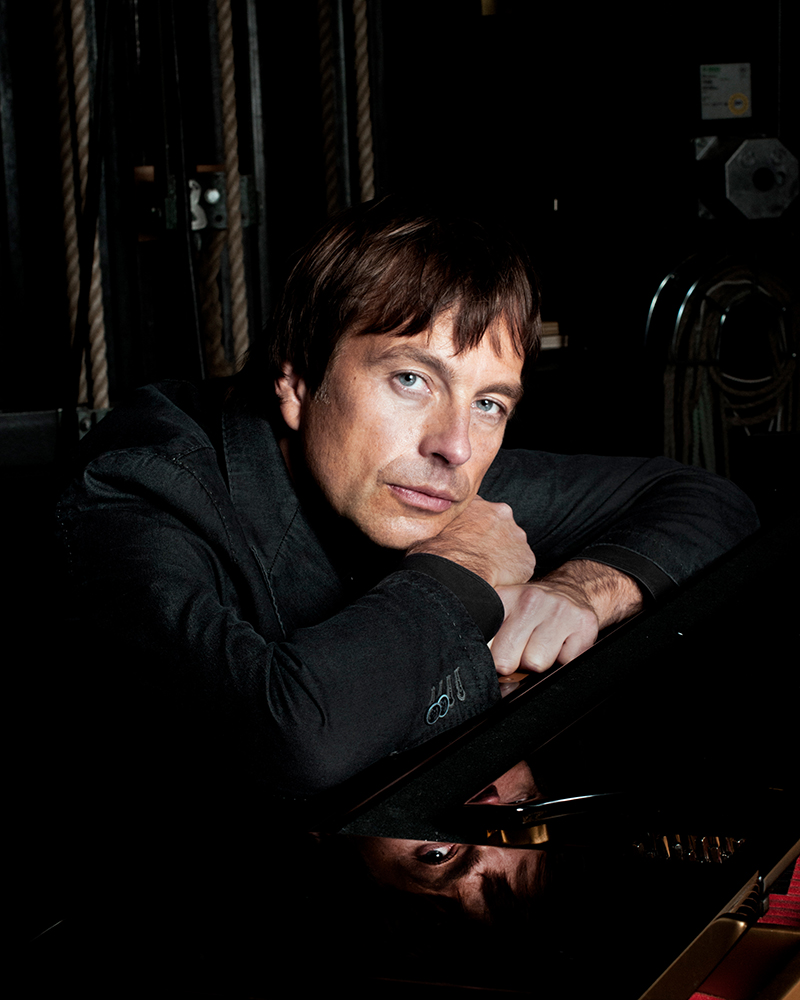
- Jan Lundgren at Ystads Teater, Sweden, in 2012. Photo: Thomas Schloemann.

Background information
- Born: 22 March 1966 (age 60); Olofström, Sweden
- Genre: Jazz
- Occupations: Musician, composer
- Instrument: Piano
- Years active: 1991–present
- Labels: Bee Jazz, Fresh Sound, ACT, Marshmallow, Volenza, Sittel, Four Leaf Clover, Gazell, Parlophone
- Website: janlundgren.com

Jan Lundgren (born 22 March 1966) is an internationally active Swedish jazz musician. He is a pianist, composer, and senior lecturer at the Malmö Academy of Music, where he has taught since autumn 1991, as well as the artistic director of the Ystad Sweden Jazz Festival, Ystad Winter Piano Fest and Jazzhus Montmartre in Copenhagen. He is a Steinway Artist and has won many awards. He tours internationally and is signed to the German record label, ACT.

== Biography ==
Lundgren was born in Olofström, Blekinge County, and grew up in Ronneby in the south of Sweden. He started to play the piano at the age of five, and decided in his late teens to become a professional musician. After graduating from the Malmö Academy of Music in 1991, he began to establish himself as a musician on the Swedish jazz scene. Initially, he was often a sideman in various contexts and styles, and collaborated with many well-known artists in Sweden. As his own career took off, he focused on working as a soloist and developing artistic collaborations. Early in his career, he played with Swedish jazz musicians such as Arne Domnérus, Putte Wickman and Rune Gustafsson and through that gained an invaluable grounding in the Swedish jazz tradition. It was Arne Domnérus who discovered Lundgren.

Lungren's international career began in the mid-1990s, when the first album under his own name, Conclusion, released in 1994, was launched in Europe, North America and Japan. His first contacts with the American jazz scene developed via the saxophonist Herb Geller into regular collaborations with Dick Bank, a producer for Fresh Sound Records.

In 1995, he formed the Jan Lundgren Trio with bassist Mattias Svensson and drummer Rasmus Kihlberg. The trio's breakthrough came through the album Swedish Standards in 1997, which won Orkesterjournalen's Gyllene skivan award for the Year's Best Jazz Album. In 2000, Lundgren became the first Scandinavian jazz pianist to play at Carnegie Hall in New York City when the trio took part in the concert "Swedish Jazz Salutes the USA".

During the 2000s, his international career continued to progress, and his artistic development broadened and deepened. In the first decade, Lundgren placed great emphasis on his trio. Subsequently, he has been involved in several other constellations and made space for his own composing. Throughout his career, he has sought out and initiated artistic collaborations. This has led to projects with leading artists, both in the studio and in concert. These include Mare Nostrum with Paolo Fresu and Richard Galliano, Magnum Mysterium with Gustaf Sjökvist's chamber choir and Lars Danielsson, Jan Lundgren Trio with Mattias Svensson and Zoltán Csörsz, Jazz på svenskt vis with the Jan Lundgren Trio & Göteborg Wind Orchestra, Potsdamer Quartet with Jukka Perko, Dan Berglund and Morten Lund, A Tribute to Jan Johansson with Mattias Svensson and a string quartet, Kristallen with Nils Landgren and Into the Night with Lars Danielsson and Émile Parisien.

Lundgren resides in Ystad since 2005.

=== Collaborations ===
==== Collaborations initiated before 2000 ====
Swedish artists and musicians

Jazz: Karl-Martin Almqvist, Peter Asplund, Hans Backenroth, Anders Bergcrantz, Arne Domnérus, Lars Erstrand, Rune Gustafsson, Rasmus Kihlberg, Gunnar "Siljabloo" Nilsson, Mattias Svensson, Viktoria Tolstoy, Ulf Wakenius, Putte Wickman, Monica Zetterlund. Popular music: Povel Ramel, Sylvia Vrethammar.

International artists and musicians

Eric Alexander, Joe Ascione, Benny Bailey, Chuck Berghofer, Deborah Brown, Conte Candoli, Dave Carpenter, Billy Drummond, Art Farmer, Herb Geller, Benny Golson, Johnny Griffin, Vincent Herring, Paul Kreibich, Joe LaBarbera, Jesper Lundgaard, Katrine Madsen, Bill Perkins, Rich Perry, Alex Riel, Peter Washington.

==== Collaborations initiated after 2000 ====
Swedish artists and musicians

Jazz: Miriam Aida, Hans Backenroth, Dan Berglund, Lars Danielsson, Ronnie Gardiner, Bengt Hallberg, Nils Landgren, Klas Lindquist, Carin Lundin, Georg Riedel, Zoltán Csörsz, Hannah Svensson, Ewan Svensson, Jojje Wadenius. World music: Bengan Janson, Filip Jers, Ale Möller. Classical music: Håkan Hardenberger, Gustaf Sjökvist, Göran Söllscher. Popular musik: Pernilla Andersson, Marit Bergman, Jason Diakité, Göran Fristorp, LaGaylia Frazier, Hayati Kafe, Lill Lindfors, Edda Magnason, Michael Saxell.

Swedish writers and actors

Pernilla August, Jacques Werup.

International artists and musicians

Harry Allen, Arild Andersen, Jacob Fischer, Paolo Fresu, Richard Galliano, Nico Gori, Wolfgang Haffner, Scott Hamilton, Pete Jolly, Stacey Kent, Trudy Kerr, Rebecca Kilgore, Lee Konitz, Morten Lund, Grégoire Maret, Charlie Mariano, Andy Martin, James Moody, Cæcilie Norby, Émile Parisien, Clarence Penn, Jukka Perko, Yosuke Sato, Janis Siegel, Clark Terry, Tom Warrington, Kenny Washington.

=== Steinway Artist ===
In 2007, Jan Lundgren became the first Scandinavian jazz pianist to be named as a Steinway Artist by the famous piano company Steinway & Sons. The renowned company was founded in New York by Henry E. Steinway in 1853.

== Critical reaction ==
Mark Gilbert of Jazz Journal has made the following observation of Lundgren: "He [began] as a classically trained pianist and the practice is unmistakable in the pinpoint precision, lucid articulation, unerring melodic sense and apparently effortless range that characterise his piano playing; he quickly creates a sense of musical security and trust."

Commenting on Lundgren's 2011 album Together Again ...At The Jazz Bakery, US jazz critic Doug Ramsey wrote: "Mr. Lundgren's clarity of execution matches the clarity of his ideas. He is at the top of his game in all of the elements of jazz pianism: touch, dynamics, harmonic imagination, swing, power and delicacy".

In his review of Lundgren's 2013 solo album Man in the Fog, Jazz Journal critic Michael Tucker cited two tracks as "delicious examples of this wide-ranging pianist’s clarity of ideas and phrasing and simultaneous delicacy and purposiveness of touch."

In a September 2014 interview with Lundgren published by Marc Myers on his JazzWax blog, Myers said of the Trio's Flowers of Sendai album: "There’s enormous beauty here in chord voicings and how they resolve. It's impossible not to be moved by the delicacy and beauty."

== Ystad Sweden Jazz Festival ==
Jan Lundgren is the Artistic Director of the Ystad Sweden Jazz Festival, an annual jazz festival held in late July-early August. The festival was founded in 2010 by Jan Lundgren and Thomas Lantz.

Artists who have performed at the Ystad Sweden Jazz Festival include: Cyrille Aimée, Monty Alexander, Jan Allan, Arild Andersen, Kenny Barron, Anders Bergcrantz, Stefano Bollani, Richard Bona, Fabrizio Bosso, Cristina Branco, Dee Dee Bridgewater, Deborah Brown, Vivian Buczek, Avishai Cohen (trumpeter), Avishai Cohen (bassist), Yamandu Costa, Lily Dahab, Lars Danielsson, Rosalia de Souza, Al Di Meola, Louis van Dijk, Dave Douglas, Elina Duni, Eliane Elias, Bill Evans, Jacob Fischer, Paolo Fresu, Richard Galliano, Herb Geller, Robert Glasper, Benny Golson, Benny Green, Rigmor Gustafsson, Wolfgang Haffner, Bengt Hallberg, Scott Hamilton, Roy Hargrove, Billy Harper, Tom Harrell, Dave Holland, Hiromi, Abdullah Ibrahim, Bob James, Lars Jansson, Nicole Johänntgen, Quincy Jones, Goran Kajfes, Jacob Karlzon, Omer Klein, Karin Krog, Joachim Kühn, Nils Landgren, Charles Lloyd, Joe Lovano, The Manhattan Transfer, Grégoire Maret, Pat Martino, Hugh Masekela, Cécile McLorin Salvant, Nils Petter Molvær, Joyce Moreno, Leszek Możdżer, Cæcilie Norby, Lina Nyberg, Émile Parisien, Clarence Penn, Jukka Perko, Enrico Pieranunzi, Iiro Rantala, Enrico Rava, Joshua Redman, Dianne Reeves, Georg Riedel, Bernt Rosengren, Kurt Rosenwinkel, Terje Rypdal, Heinz Sauer, Andreas Schaerer, Diane Schuur, John Scofield, Omar Sosa, John Surman, Tomasz Stanko, Bobo Stenson, Yosuke Sato, Ewan Svensson, Hannah Svensson, Martin Taylor, Toots Thielemans, Jesper Thilo, Svante Thuresson, Martin Tingvall, Viktoria Tolstoy, Tonbruket, Bengt-Arne Wallin, Marcin Wasilewski, Bugge Wesseltoft, Michael Wollny, Lizz Wright, Youn Sun Nah, Dhafer Youssef, Kjell Öhman.

The Ystad Sweden Jazz Festival was awarded the Ystad Municipality Culture Prize in 2021. Earlier the same year, the national association, Swedish Jazz, named Ystad Municipality as the Jazz Municipality of the Year.

== Ystad Winter Piano Fest ==
Jan Lundgren is the initiator and Artistic Director of the Ystad Winter Piano Fest, Sweden's first piano jazz festival. The first festival was held 27–28 December 2021. The pianists who performed at the festival were: Nik Bärtsch, Jacob Karlzon, Jan Lundgren, Marialy Pacheco, Iiro Rantala and Johanna Summer.

== Jazzhus Montmartre ==
Since December 2016, Jan Lundgren has also been the Artistic Director of the famous jazz club Jazzhus Montmartre in Copenhagen. The jazz club opened in 1959 and legendary artists such as Chet Baker, Stan Getz, Dexter Gordon and Ben Webster have played there.

== Awards and honors ==
- 1993: Thore Swanerud Scholarship.
- 1994: Harry Arnold Scholarship.
- 1994: Radio Sweden's prize Jazzkatten in the Jazz Musician of the Year category.
- 1995: Topsys tusenkrona – Nalen Foundation.
- 1995: City of Malmö Culture Scholarship.
- 1998: Orkesterjournalen's prize Gyllene skivan for Swedish Standards (released 1997).
- 2000: Jan Johansson Scholarship.
- 2008: Django d'Or Contemporary Star of Jazz.
- 2010: Thore Ehrling Scholarship.
- 2010: Region Blekinge Culture Prize.
- 2012: Region Skåne Culture Prize.
- 2013: Jazz Journal – Jazz Record of the Year – Critics' Poll for Together Again at the Jazz Bakery (released 2012).
- 2013: Ystad Municipality Culture Prize.
- 2015: Jazz Journal – Jazz Record of the Year – Critics' Poll for All by Myself (released 2014).
- 2019: Ellen & Svend Asmussen Award.
- 2020: Danish-Swedish Culture Fund Prize.
- 2023: Guldnålen, award given once a year by Jazz i Malmö.

== Compositions ==
=== Published sheet music ===
The Jan Lundgren Collection (Hal Leonard/Bosworth Edition/ACT), published in 2021, contains 20 original compositions by Jan Lundgren: 1. Blekinge 2. Blue Silence 3. Dance of Masja 4. Farväl 5. Leklåt 6. Love in Return 7. Love Land 8. Lycklig resa 9. The Magic Stroll 10. Mare Nostrum 11. Never Too Late 12. No. 9 13. On the Banks of the Seine 14. Open Your Mind 15. The Poet 16. Potsdamer Platz 17. Ronneby 18. The Seagull 19. Song for Jörgen 20. Years Ahead

=== Selected compositions ===
- A Dog Named Jazze (album: Into the Night, ACT, 2021)
- A Touch of You (album: A Touch of You, Alfa, 2003)
- Almas Vaggvisa (album: I Love Jan Lundgren Trio, Figaro Music, 2014)
- Bird of Passage (album: Bird of Passage, Four Leaf Clover, 1995)
- Blekinge (album: Kristallen, ACT, 2020)
- Blue Silence (album: Mare Nostrum II, ACT, 2016)
- Bullet Train (album: Potsdamer Platz, ACT, 2017)
- Conclusion (album: Conclusion, Four Leaf Clover, 1994)
- Dance of Masja (album: Potsdamer Platz, ACT, 2017)
- Farväl (album: Mare Nostrum II, ACT, 2016)
- Flowers of Sendai (album: Flowers of Sendai, Bee Jazz, 2014)
- Hidden Truth (album: I Love Jan Lundgren Trio, Figaro Music, 2014)
- I Do (album: Into the Night, ACT, 2021)
- Into the Night (album: Into the Night, ACT, 2021)
- Leklåt (album: Mare Nostrum II, ACT, 2016)
- Love in Return (Mare Nostrum III, ACT, 2019)
- Love Land (album: Bengan Janson–Jan Lundgren–Ulf Wakenius, Ladybird, 2011; Mare Nostrum III, ACT, 2019)
- Lycklig resa (album: Potsdamer Platz, ACT, 2017)
- Man in the Fog (album: Man in the Fog, Bee Jazz, 2013)
- Mare Nostrum (album: Mare Nostrum, ACT, 2007)
- M.Z. (album: Lockrop, Gemini Records, 2006)
- Never Too Late (album: Potsdamer Platz, ACT, 2017)
- No. 9 (album: Potsdamer Platz, ACT, 2017)
- On the Banks of the Seine (album: Potsdamer Platz, ACT, 2017)
- Open Your Mind (album: Mare Nostrum, ACT, 2007)
- Parfait Amour (album: Flowers of Sendai, Bee Jazz, 2014)
- Potsdamer Platz (album: Potsdamer Platz, ACT, 2017)
- Ronneby (Mare Nostrum III, ACT, 2019)
- Second Time First (album: We Will Always Be Together, Gazell, 2004)
- Short Life (album: Conclusion, Four Leaf Clover, 1994)
- Song for Jörgen (album: Potsdamer Platz, ACT, 2017)
- Stenhuggarens visa (album: Lockrop, Gemini, 2006)
- The Expatriate (album: For Listeners Only, Sittel, 2001)
- The Longest Night (album: Back 2 Back, Volenza, 2011)
- The Magic Stroll (album: Mare Nostrum III, ACT, 2019)
- The Poet (album: Potsdamer Platz, ACT, 2017)
- The Seagull (album: Mare Nostrum, ACT, 2007)
- Time to Leave Again (album: For Listeners Only, Sittel, 2001)
- Twelve Tone Rag (album: Potsdamer Platz, ACT, 2017)
- View of P (album: Man in the Fog, Bee Jazz, 2013)
- Years Ahead (album: Mare Nostrum, ACT, 2007)

== Discography ==
- 1994 – Conclusion (Four Leaf Clover)
- 1994 – Stockholm-Get-Together (Fresh Sound)
- 1995 – New York Calling (Alfa)
- 1996 – Bird of Passage (Four Leaf Clover)
- 1996 – California Connection (Fresh Sound-Four Leaf Clover)
- 1996 – Cooking! At the Jazz Bakery (Fresh Sound)
- 1997 – Swedish Standards (Sittel, re-released by ACT, 2009)
- 1998 – A Touch of You (Alfa)
- 1999 – Something to Live For (Sittel)
- 2000 – For Listeners Only (Sittel)
- 2001 – Jan Lundgren Trio Plays the Music of Victor Young (Sittel)
- 2001 – Lonely One (Marshmallow)
- 2001 – Collaboration with Pete Jolly (Fresh Sound)
- 2001 – Presents Miriam Aida & Fredrik Kronkvist (Sittel)
- 2002 – Charade (Marshmallow)
- 2002 – Jan Lundgren Trio Plays the Music of Jule Styne (Sittel)
- 2003 – Perfidia (Marshmallow)
- 2003 – Svenska landskap [aka Landscapes] (Sittel)
- 2003 – Blue Lights (Marshmallow)
- 2003 – Celebrating the Music of Matt Dennis (Fresh Sound)
- 2004 – Les Parapluies de Cherbourg (Marshmallow)
- 2004 – En sommarkonsert (with Putte Wickman and Göran Fristorp)
- 2004 – We Will Always Be Together with Putte Wickman (Gazell)
- 2005 – In New York (Marshmallow)
- 2005 – An Intimate Salute to Frankie with Putte Wickman (Gazell)
- 2006 – Lockrop with Georg Riedel (Gemini)
- 2006 – Plays Cole Porter Love Songs (Marshmallow)
- 2006 – History of Piano Jazz [solo piano] (Fagerdala Event)
- 2006 – How About You with Andy Martin (Fresh Sound)
- 2007 – A Swinging Rendezvous (Marshmallow)
- 2007 – Mare Nostrum with Paolo Fresu & Richard Galliano (ACT)
- 2007 – Magnum Mysterium (ACT)
- 2008 – Soft Summer Breeze (Marshmallow)
- 2009 – European Standards with Mattias Svensson & Zoltan Csörsz Jr (ACT)
- 2009 – Jul på Svenska with Georg Wadenius & Arild Andersen (EMI)
- 2010 – Too Darn Hot (Volenza)
- 2011 – Back 2 Back with Bengt Hallberg (Volenza)
- 2011 – Together Again ...At The Jazz Bakery with Chuck Berghofer & Joe La Barbera (Fresh Sound)>
- 2012 – Until It's Time with LaGaylia Frazier (Prophone)
- 2013 – Man in the Fog [solo piano] (Bee Jazz)
- 2013 – Jul på Norska with Georg Wadenius & Arild Andersen (EMI)
- 2013 – I Love Jan Lundgren Trio with Mattias Svensson & Zoltan Csörsz Jr (Figaro)
- 2014 – Flowers of Sendai with Mattias Svensson & Zoltan Csörsz Jr (Bee Jazz)
- 2014 – All By Myself [solo piano] (Fresh Sound)
- 2014 – Quietly There with Harry Allen (Stunt)
- 2015 – A Retrospective [compilation] (Fresh Sound)
- 2016 – The Ystad Concert: A Tribute to Jan Johansson with Mattias Svensson & Bonfiglioli Weber String Quartet (ACT)
- 2016 – Mare Nostrum II with Paolo Fresu & Richard Galliano (ACT)
- 2017 – Potsdamer Platz (ACT)
- 2019 – Mare Nostrum III with Paolo Fresu & Richard Galliano (ACT)
- 2020 – Kristallen with Nils Landgren (ACT)
- 2021 – Into the Night with Lars Danielsson & Émile Parisien (ACT)
- 2022 – Jazz Poetry with Hans Backenroth (ACT)

Jan Lundgren Discography compiled by Gerard Bielderman, Eurojazz Discos No. 191.
