= E.S.T. Symphony =

Live album by Esbjörn Svensson Trio
- Released: October 28, 2016
- Recorded: June 10, 11 and 12, 2016
- Venue: Konserthuset, Stockholm, Sweden
- Genre: Jazz
- Length: 77:39
- Label: ACT; ACT 9042-2
- Producer: Esbjörn Svensson Trio

Esbjörn Svensson Trio chronology
301 (2012)	E.S.T. Symphony (2016)	E.S.T. Live in London (2018)

E.S.T. Symphony is an album of symphonic versions of compositions by the Esbjörn Svensson Trio which was recorded at the Stockholm Concert Hall in 2016 and released on the ACT label.

== Reception ==
Professional ratings
Review scores
Source	Rating
All About Jazz	4/5 stars
The Guardian	4/5 stars

All About Jazz reviewer Karl Ackermann stated, "There is, perhaps, a bit of the rawness in the original e.s.t. recordings that is smoothed over with the number and types of instruments involved here, but that is a minor nitpick. E.S.T. Symphony reminds fans of the endless potential that the trio had. e.s.t. became edgier as it moved through its final ACT releases ... E.S.T. Symphony wisely avoids any attempt to entirely reproduce the e.s.t. sound while adding a welcome collection to the legend of the group". The Guardian's John Fordham said " With its shapely themes, subtle pacing and big climaxes, his popular trio’s music was ideal material, eloquently confirmed here by arranger Hans Ek, the Royal Stockholm Philharmonic and four star jazz soloists ... It’s all beautifully and devotedly done".

== Track listing ==
All compositions by Esbjörn Svensson, Dan Berglund and Magnus Öström

1. "e.s.t. Prelude" – 6:42
2. "From Gagarin's Point of View" – 4:43
3. "When God Created the Coffeebreak" – 6:21
4. "Seven Days of Falling" – 7:30
5. "Wonderland Suite" – 12:53
6. "Serenade for the Renegade" – 6:28
7. "Dodge the Dodo" – 6:51
8. "Eighthundred Streets by Feet" – 5:16
9. "Viaticum Suite" – 10:47
10. "Behind the Yashmak" – 10:09

== Personnel ==
- Royal Stockholm Philharmonic Orchestra arranged and conducted by Hans Ek
- Verneri Pohjola – trumpet
- Marius Neset – saxophone
- Iiro Rantala – piano
- Johan Lindström – pedal steel guitar
- Dan Berglund – double bass
- Magnus Öström – drums
- Esbjörn Svensson – arranger (track 7)
