= Seven Days of Falling =

Studio album by Esbjörn Svensson Trio (E.S.T.)
- Released: 9 December 2003
- Recorded: June 2003
- Genre: Jazz
- Label: ACT Music
- Producer: E.S.T.

Esbjörn Svensson Trio (E.S.T.) chronology
Strange Place for Snow (2002)	Seven Days of Falling (2003)	Live in Stockholm (2003)

Professional ratings
Review scores
Source	Rating
Allmusic	4/5 stars
The Penguin Guide to Jazz Recordings	3/4 stars

Seven Days of Falling is a studio album by the Swedish group Esbjörn Svensson Trio that was recorded and released in 2003. The album had the unusual distinction charting on both the top jazz and popular music albums charts.

== Reception ==
The recording was praised for its accessibility by The Times, and was The Birmingham Post's Jazz CD of the Week. It received the German Jazz and Swedish Grammy-award 2004.

== Track listing ==
1. "Ballad for the Unborn" — 5:32
2. "Seven Days of Falling" — 6:26
3. "Mingle in the Mincing-Machine" — 6:52
4. "Evening in Atlantis" — 0:50
5. "Did They Ever Tell Cousteau?" — 6:05
6. "Believe, Beleft, Below" — 4:51
7. "Elevation of Love" — 6:43
8. "In My Garage" — 4:18
9. "Why She Couldn't Come" — 6:30
10. "O.D.R.I.P." — 14:26

The last track of the CD release – "O.D.R.I.P." – contains a hidden track. The tracks itself ends at 08:19 and after about several minutes of silence the hidden track commences, a vocal rendering of "Believe, Beleft, Below" sung by Josh Haden.

== Personnel ==
- Esbjörn Svensson Trio
  - Dan Berglund – double bass
  - Magnus Öström – drums
  - Esbjörn Svensson – piano
- Sven Dolling – art direction
- Patrik Sehlstedt – photography
