= Tuesday Wonderland =

Studio album by Esbjörn Svensson Trio (E.S.T.)
- Released: 2006
- Recorded: March 2006
- Genre: Jazz
- Label: ACT Music
- Producer: E.S.T.

Esbjörn Svensson Trio (E.S.T.) chronology
| Viaticum (2005) | Tuesday Wonderland (2006) | Live in Hamburg (2007) |

Professional ratings
Review scores
| Source | Rating |
|---|---|
| The Penguin Guide to Jazz Recordings | 3/4 stars |

Tuesday Wonderland is a 2006 jazz album by Esbjörn Svensson Trio (E.S.T.).

== Track list ==
1. Fading Maid Preludium 4:10
2. Tuesday Wonderland 6:30
3. The Goldhearted Miner 4:51
4. Brewery Of Beggars 8:22
5. Beggar's Blanket 2:53
6. Dolores In A Shoestand 8:52
7. Where We Used To Live 4:25
8. Eighthundred Streets By Feet 6:47
9. Goldwrap 3:59
10. Sipping On The Solid Ground 4:32
11. Fading Maid Postludium 5:08

== Personnel ==
- Esbjörn Svensson Trio
  - Dan Berglund – double bass
  - Magnus Öström – drums
  - Esbjörn Svensson – piano

Recorded and mixed at Bohus Sound Recording Studios, Gothenburg, Sweden in March 2006. Mastered at Bohus Mastering.
