= E.S.T. Live in London =

Live album by Esbjörn Svensson Trio
- Released: May 11, 2018
- Recorded: May 20, 2005
- Venue: Barbican Centre, London, England
- Genre: Jazz
- Length: 104:49
- Label: ACT; ACT 9042-2
- Producer: Esbjörn Svensson Trio

Esbjörn Svensson Trio chronology
E.S.T. Symphony (2016)	E.S.T. Live in London (2018)

E.S.T. Live in London is an album by the Esbjörn Svensson Trio recorded at the Barbican Centre in 2005 and released on the ACT label in 2018 to mark the tenth anniversary of Esbjörn Svensson's death.

== Reception ==
Professional ratings
Review scores
Source	Rating
All About Jazz	5/5 stars
All About Jazz	5/5 stars

All About Jazz reviewer Karl Ackermann stated, "e.s.t. live in london asks that we once again consider the magnitude of this trio. Their body of work has helped to broaden the definition of jazz, as it has not been redefined again in the passing ten years. ... It is a trio that, a decade on, seems to be a once-in-a-lifetime experience. e.s.t. live in london is highly recommended and an essential for collectors who believe that jazz is meant to be a fluid, shifting genre". On the same site Geno Thackara noted "this splendid release should bring a ray of happiness to old and new listeners alike. e.s.t. live in London captures the band on a magical evening when everything went right". On London Jazz News, Adrian Pallant said "with e.s.t., there was always the sense of leaping ahead over conventional boundaries, each new release or gig introducing engaging sonic blends, all delivered with enthralling technical prowess. For aficionado or newcomer, e.s.t. live in London has it all, in glorious technicolor".

== Track listing ==
All compositions by Esbjörn Svensson, Dan Berglund and Magnus Öström

Disc One:

1. "Tide of Trepidation" – 9:50
2. "Eighty-Eight Days in My Veins" – 9:17
3. "Viaticum" – 6:55
4. "Mingle in the Mincing-Machine" – 14:22
5. "In the Tail of Her Eye" – 7:13
6. "The Unstable Table & The Infamous Fable" – 12:55

Disc Two:

1. "When God Created the Coffeebreak" – 8:53
2. "Behind the Yashmak" – 17:32
3. "Believe, Beleft, Below" – 7:24
4. "Spunky Sprawl" – 10:30

== Personnel ==
- Esbjörn Svensson – piano
- Dan Berglund – double bass
- Magnus Öström – drums
