= Håkan Broström =

- Born: 12 April 1955 (age 71); Motala, Sweden
- Genres: Jazz
- Occupations: alto and soprano saxophone player, composer, arranger, conductor
- Years active: 1977 –

Håkan Broström (born 1955, Motala, Sweden) is a Swedish saxophonist, composer, and arranger known for his contributions to jazz and contemporary music.

== Biography ==
He started playing the piano at the age of eight. As a teenager, he took up the tenor saxophone and flute, further deepening his passion for music. In the early 1970s, Broström relocated to Malmö to study at the local music college, where he was mentored by the acclaimed saxophonist and arranger Helge Albin. During this period, he explored various saxophones, including alto and soprano, and gained valuable experience performing in blues and jazz genres with different bands. While living in Malmö, he co-founded his first group, Equinox, alongside tenor saxophonist Tomas Franck.

Over the years, Broström has led several quartets, collaborating with notable musicians such as Bobo Stenson, Esbjörn Svensson, Palle Danielsson and Jacob Karlzon. He also led a quartet featuring American pianist Joey Calderazzo and, on occasion, drummer Jeff "Tain" Watts. As a sideman, Broström has worked with prominent artists like Eje Thelin, Ulf Wakenius and Swedish music icon Peps Persson.

In addition to his work with small groups and quartets, Broström freelanced with the renowned Norrbotten Big Band based in Luleå from 1993 to 2023. This collaboration provided him opportunities to write big band arrangements for esteemed artists such as Dee Dee Bridgewater, Dave Liebman, Chris Potter, Carmen Lundy and Conrad Herwig.

During the 2000s and beyond, Håkan Broström expanded his creative pursuits by forming his own big band, the New Places Orchestra. This endeavor showcased his talent for blending traditional and modern jazz elements. He also collaborated with prominent Swedish artists, including Viktoria Tolstoy, Tommy Körberg and Ebbot Lundberg further solidifying his reputation as a versatile and innovative musician.

== Discography ==
The albums listed here are those where Håkan Broström was the leader. As a sideman have participated on several albums with artists as Norrbotten Big Band and Peps Persson plus over fifty other albums with various artists.

- Dark Light, 1991
- Celestial Nights, 1994
- Still Dreaming, 1996
- Do You Remember, 2003
- New Places, 2005
- Refraction/featuring Joey Calderazzo, 2010
- Episodes from the Future and the Past/ with Marilyn Mazur, 2014
- My Cat Siri, 2021
- The Copenhagen Session, 2022
- Cosmic Friends, 2023
- Forgotten Memories, 2023
- Moments för lovers, 2023
