= Esbjörn Svensson =

Swedish jazz pianist (1964–2008)

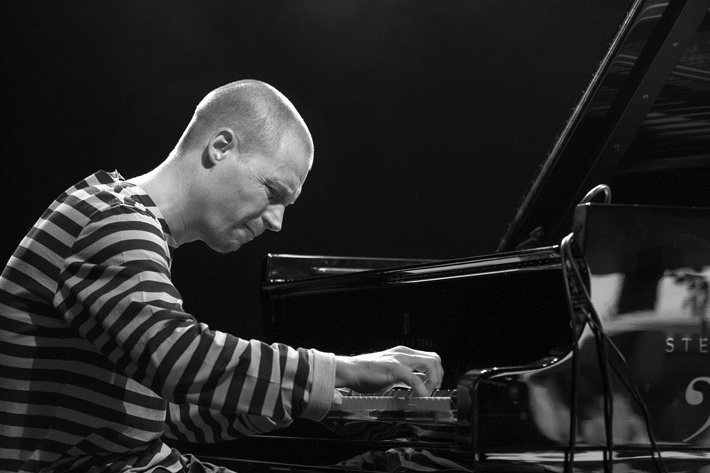
- Svensson in concert, Ghent, 2007

Background information
- Born: Bror Fredrik Esbjörn Svensson; 16 April 1964; Skultuna, Sweden
- Died: 14 June 2008 (aged 44) Stockholm, Sweden
- Genres: Jazz
- Occupation: Musician
- Instrument: Piano
- Years active: 1980–2008
- Labels: ACT Music & Vision (licensed from Spamboolimbo Productions AB)
- Formerly of: Esbjörn Svensson Trio
- Website: Official website

Bror Fredrik "Esbjörn" Svensson (16 April 1964 – 14 June 2008) was a Swedish jazz pianist and founder of the jazz group Esbjörn Svensson Trio, commonly known as e.s.t.

Svensson became one of Europe's most successful jazz musicians at the turn of the 21st century before his death, at the age of 44, in a scuba diving accident.

== Early life and work ==
Svensson was introduced to both classical music and jazz very early in life through his mother, a classical pianist, and his father, a jazz enthusiast, and first showed interest in classical music. In his teenage years, he developed an interest in rock music and started a few garage bands with classmates, before going back to classical music and finally making his way towards jazz. At the age of 16, Svensson went to a music college, where he took piano lessons. He later studied at the Royal College of Music, Stockholm, for four years.

In 1990, Svensson established his own jazz combo with his childhood friend Magnus Öström on percussion. Both had made their first appearances on stage as sidemen in the Swedish and Danish jazz scene during the 1980s. In 1993, bassist Dan Berglund joined the duo, and the Esbjörn Svensson Trio was born. The trio released its debut album, When Everyone Has Gone, in 1993, and in the following years established itself in the Nordic jazz scene. Svensson was nominated for Swedish Jazz Musician of the Year in 1995 and 1996.

== Rise to prominence and death ==
The trio's international breakthrough came with their 1999 album From Gagarin's Point Of View, their first album to be released outside Scandinavia. With the release of their albums Good Morning Susie Soho (2000) and Strange Place for Snow (2002), the trio drew the attention of United States audiences. In 2002, they toured Europe, the U.S. and Japan over 9 months. Their subsequent albums, Seven Days of Falling (2003), Viaticum (2005), and Tuesday Wonderland (2006), were equally well received by critics and resulted in several music industry award nominations as well as making the jazz and pop charts.

e.s.t. was the first European jazz combo to make the front page of the American jazz magazine DownBeat (May 2006 issue). Their last live album, e.s.t. Live in Hamburg, a recording of their fall 2006 concert in Hamburg, Germany, as part of the Tuesday Wonderland Tour, was released in November 2007. Before Svensson's death, the trio had already finished the work for what became their album "Leucocyte", which was posthumously released in September 2008. The music to the album was recorded during a 9-hour jam at Studios 301 in Sydney and in 2012 another album was released with music from that same recording entitled 301. e.s.t.'s last performance took place in Moscow, Russia, at the Tchaikovsky Hall, on 30 May 2008. In addition to his work with e.s.t., Svensson recorded albums with Nils Landgren, Lina Nyberg and Viktoria Tolstoy.

On 14 June 2008, Svensson went missing during a scuba diving session on Ingarö outside Stockholm, Sweden. His diving companions, including an instructor and Esbjörn's then 14-year-old son, eventually found him lying unconscious on the seabed. Having sustained serious injuries, he was rushed to Karolinska University Hospital by helicopter, but could not be saved. He was 44 years old, married and the father of two sons.

== Discography ==
=== As leader/co-leader ===
Studio albums

- When Everyone Has Gone (1993) Dragon
- Winter in Venice (1997) Superstudio GUL
- EST plays Monk (1996) Superstudio GUL
- From Gagarin's Point of View (1999) Superstudio GUL
- Good Morning Susie Soho (2000) Superstudio GUL
- Strange Place for Snow (2002) Superstudio GUL
- Seven Days of Falling (2003) Superstudio GUL
- Viaticum (2005) Spamboolimbo
- Tuesday Wonderland (2006, Recorded and mixed by Åke Linton at Bohus Sound Recording Studios, Gothenburg, Sweden, in March 2006)
- Leucocyte (2008, recorded by Åke Linton at Studios 301, Sydney, Australia)
- 301 (2012, recorded in January 2007 at Studios 301, Sydney, Australia) ACT

Live albums

- E.S.T. Live '95 (1995, released in Sweden as Mr. & Mrs. Handkerchief) ACT Music + Vision
- Live in Stockholm (2003) DVD, recorded 10 December 2000 – including videos and an interview
- Live in Hamburg (2007, recorded 22 November 2006)
- E.S.T. Live in London (2018, recorded 20 May 2005)
- E.S.T. Live in Gothenburg (ACT, 2019), recorded 2001

Compilation albums

- Somewhere Else Before (U.S. compilation from From Gagarin's Point of View and Good Morning Susie Soho, 2001)
- Retrospective - The Very Best of E.S.T. (2009)

Compilation with other artists

- Solo Flights (Solo performances by Steve Dobrogosz (3 tracks), Bobo Stenson (2 tracks), Anders Widmark (5 tracks), Esbjörn Svensson (4 tracks). Scandinavian Songs Music Group, 1997)

Solo

- Home.S (posthumous release, ACT Music, 2022)

=== As sideman ===
With the Fredrik Noren Band

- Joao Carlos (Dragon, 1987)

With Panta Rei

- The Dance Continues (Dragon, 1998)

With the Peter Danemo Quartet

- Banebo (Dragon, 1991)

With Lasse Lindgren

- To My Friends (Dragon, 1992)

With Lina Nyberg

- Close (Prophone Records, 1993)

With Jazz Furniture

- Jazz Furniture (Caprice Records, 1994)

With Freddie Wadling

- En Skiva Till Kaffet (MNW, 1999)

With Lars Ekström

- Fair Weather (Gazell, 2000)

With Lisa Nilsson

- Små Rum (Diesel Music, 2001)

Viktoria Tolstoy (listed as "Bro Falk")

- Shining On You (ACT Music, 2004)

Nils Landgren

- Swedish Folk Modern (ACT Music, 1998)
- Fonk Da World (ACT Music, 2001)
- Layers of Light (ACT Music, 2004)
