= Hans Ek =

Swedish musician

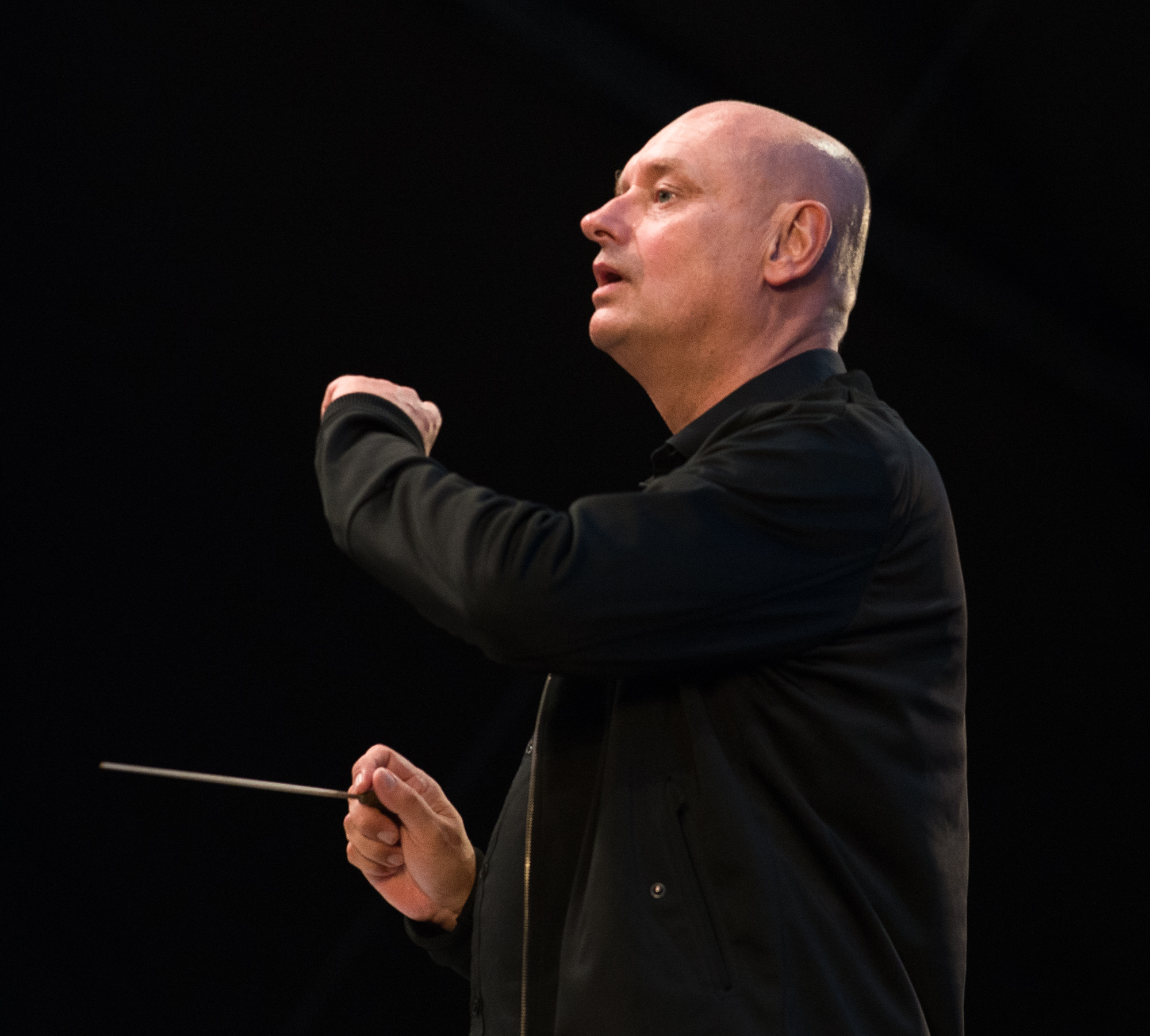
Ek in 2018

Hans Ek (born 1964 in Uppsala, Sweden) is a conductor and arranger working in the meeting between classical music, jazz, pop and folk music.

He has worked with symphony orchestras in Sweden, as well as in Norway, Denmark, Britain, Canada, Lithuania and Turkey.

Ek has been musical director of the Polar Music Prize ceremony in recent years.

In recent years he has also devoted his time to film music. He has orchestrated and recorded music for films such as Let the Right One In directed by Tomas Alfredson, Troubled Water (Erik Poppe), A Man Comes Home (Thomas Vinterberg), Effi Briest (Hermine Huntgeburth), At Point Blank (Peter Lindmark), and The Murder Farm (Bettina Oberli).

Since 2013 he has been touring with Dan Berglund and Magnus Öström of the Esbjörn Svensson Trio, performing their songs with orchestral arrangements.
