= Leucocyte (album) =

2008 album by Esbjörn Svensson Trio

Studio album by Esbjörn Svensson Trio
- Released: 30 September 2008
- Recorded: January 17–18, 2007
- Genre: Jazz
- Length: 74:38
- Label: ACT Music

Esbjörn Svensson Trio chronology
Viaticum (2005)	Leucocyte (2008)	301 (2012)

Leucocyte is a posthumous jazz album that Esbjörn Svensson Trio released on 30 September 2008 after pianist Esbjörn Svensson had died in June 2008.

== Track listing ==
1. Decade
2. Premonition I: Earth
3. Premonition II: Contorted
4. Jazz
5. Still
6. Ajar
7. Leucocyte I: Ab Initio
8. Leucocyte II: Ad Interim
9. Leucocyte III: Ad Mortem
10. Leucocyte IV: Ad Infinitum

== Reception ==
Allmusic found that "more than any other recording issued by this excellent band, Leucocyte captures the art of music making at the moment of conception." PopMatters said that the album "is refreshing if not always easy or fun listening. E.S.T. could have continued making contemplative or gospel-tinged acoustic jazz in the Jarrett/ECM mode (the brief “Ajar” here is a fine example), but Svensson and his group have been frying bigger fish from the start."

Professional ratings
Review scores
Source	Rating
Allmusic	4.5/5 stars
PopMatters	(7/10)

== Charts ==
=== Weekly charts ===
Chart (2008)	Peak position
Austrian Albums (Ö3 Austria)	64
French Albums (SNEP)	59
German Albums (Offizielle Top 100)	34
Swedish Albums (Sverigetopplistan)	2
Swiss Albums (Schweizer Hitparade)	83

=== Year-end charts ===
Chart (2008)	Position
Swedish Albums (Sverigetopplistan)	76
