= 301 (album) =

Studio album by Esbjörn Svensson Trio
- Released: 30 March 2012
- Recorded: 2007
- Studio: Studios 301, Sydney, Australia
- Genre: Jazz
- Length: 61:04
- Label: ACT Music

Esbjörn Svensson Trio chronology
Leucocyte (2008)	301 (2012)	E.S.T. Symphony (2016)

301 is the last album recorded by Esbjörn Svensson Trio, released on 30 March 2012. The album is their second released posthumously, after Leucocyte, as the pianist Esbjörn Svensson died in June 2008.

It was recorded during the same sessions of the recording of Leucocyte, whilst the Swedish trio were touring around Asia and Australia. The disc is named after Studios 301 in Sydney where the album was recorded.

Before his death, Svensson was actually involved in the editing down of the sessions into what might have been a double album. In the end, surviving members Magnus Öström and Dan Berglund elected to delay the release of 301. Regular sound engineer Åke Linton was also a key presence in the recording, editing and mixing process.

== Track listing ==
No.	Title	Length
1.	"Behind the Stars"	3:44
2.	"Inner City, City Lights"	11:48
3.	"The Left Lane"	13:37
4.	"Houston, the 5th"	3:34
5.	"Three Falling Free, Part I"	5:49
6.	"Three Falling Free, Part II"	14:30
7.	"The Childhood Dream"	8:02
Total length:		61:04
