= We are Spindye =

Swedish fashion tech company

We aRe SpinDye
- Company type: Limited company
- Industry: Fashion tech
- Founded: 2014
- Founder: Martin Berling
- Headquarters: Stockholm, Sweden
- Area served: Worldwide
- Website: www.spindye.com

We aRe SpinDye is a Swedish fashion tech company that has developed a sustainable coloring method for synthetic textiles which reduces the environmental impact compared to the traditional dyeing process. The company was founded in 2014. Headquartered in Stockholm, Sweden, We are Spindye has since it hit the market had collabs with brands such as Quiksilver, Peak Performance, Bergans of Norway, Roxy and Fjällräven.

== History ==
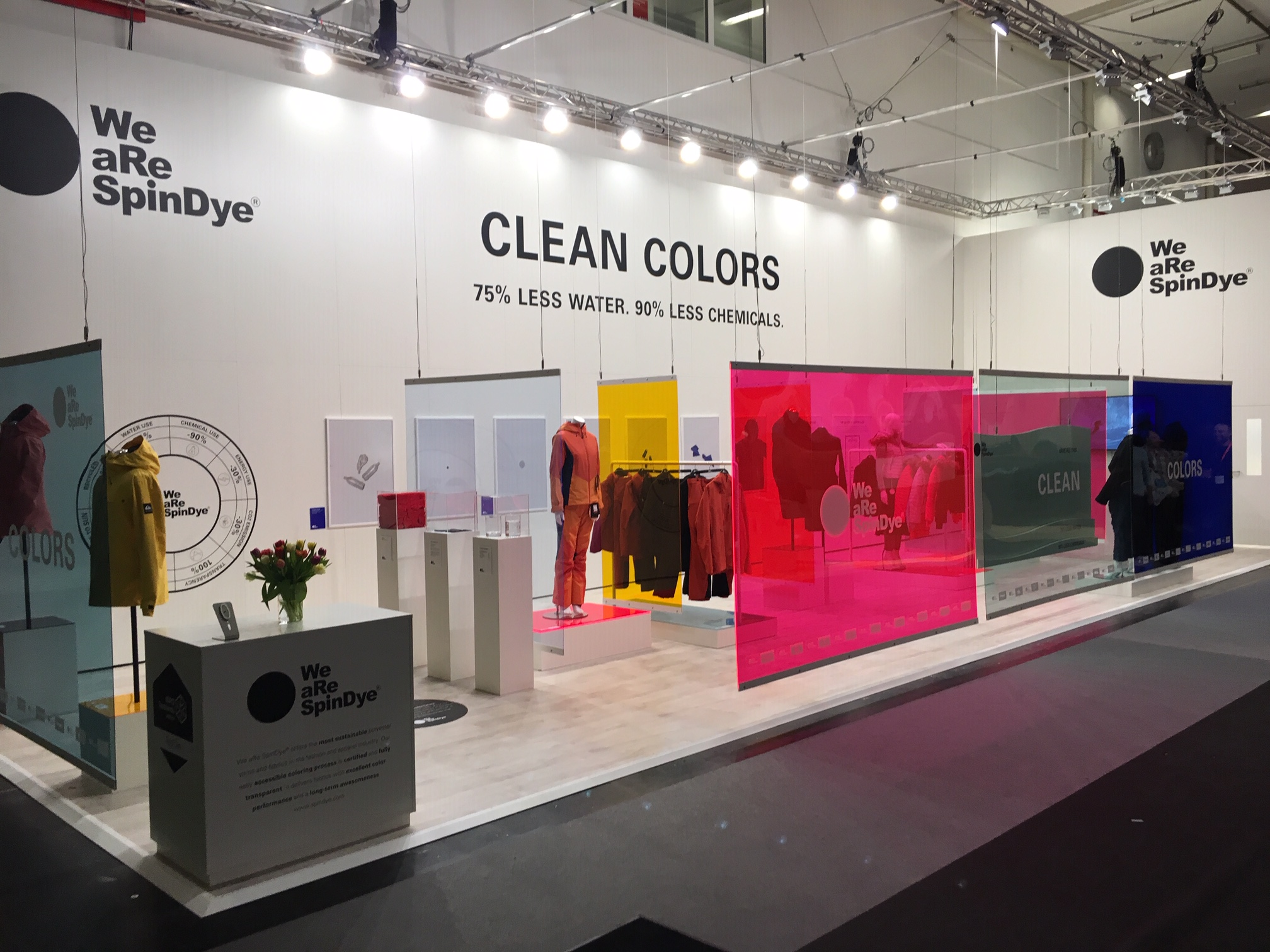
The We are Spindye booth at Ispo trade show in Munich

We are Spindye was founded by in 2014. While working in the American clothing industry, co founder Martin Berling realized that the process of dyeing textiles had a massive environmental impact. With the aim to reduce the ecological footprint of the clothing industry, Berling developed a way of precisely coloring polyester fabrics using a process that requires less water and fewer chemicals than the traditional dyeing process. According to Berling, the principles of the process he developed had been used by the car industry for decades. In 2016 Swedish outdoor company Fjällräven became the first company to use the We are Spindye technology when they launched Re-Kånken, a remake of Fjällräven's Kånken backpack. Re-Kånken backpacks are made of recycled polyester sourced from 11 plastic water bottles.

By January 2018 the number of colabs had grown to eight and included, besides Fjällräven, Quiksilver, Bergans of Norway, Roxy, Peak Performance, Pyua, Makia and Odd Molly. In the fall of 2018, We are Spindye announced that Swedish fashion brand Filippa K had chosen to use Spindye-colored fabrics in one of the garments of their Front Runners collection, a collection consisting of garments developed as sustainable as possible. At the end of August 2018 We are Spindye received a substantial cash boost when Dutch duo Textile innovation Fund and Social Impact Ventures along with Bestbase Group from China invested a combined total of 3 million euros in the company. According to Social Impact Ventures’ Eske Scavenius, who took a seat on the board of We are Spindye, as a result of the investment, the capital injection would be used to increase marketing and production capacity.

== Business ==
We are Spindye offer clothing companies a sustainable coloring method based on solution dyeing. Traditional dyeing means first producing the fiber and then dipping the fiber in dye to add the color. This requires a lot of hot water and liquid chemicals. Solution dyeing means adding the color pigment earlier in the manufacturing process, when the polyester is just little pellets. Once these pellets are colored, they are melted and turned into fibres, which are then spun into yarn. According to We are Spindye their method of coloring reduces water usage by 75%, chemical usage by 90%, energy consumption by 25% and CO_{2} emissions by 30% compared to traditional dyeing. The claims have been audited and validated by Swedish NGO Swerea. The We are Spindye color catalog consists of nearly 2000 colors, all of which have its own recipe, co-produced with NCS, to ensure that the color will always be the same regardless of the fabric or the factory.

== Awards ==
We are Spindye has received several awards for their coloring method. In April 2018 the company was awarded Eco Brand of the year in Sportfack Gear Of The Year and in June 2018 We are Spindye won the apparel category of the Scandinavian Outdoor Award hosted by Scandinavian Outdoor Group. In August 2018 We Are Spindye won the fashion tech category of Encouragement for Action 2018 award established by Stockholm Fashion District.

== Collabs ==
- Bergans of Norway
- Fjällräven
- Makia
- Odd Molly
- Peak Performance
- Pyua
- Quiksilver
- Roxy
