= Jacob Karlzon =

Swedish pianist

Jacob Karlzon (born 19 October 1970 in Sweden) is a pianist.

== Career ==
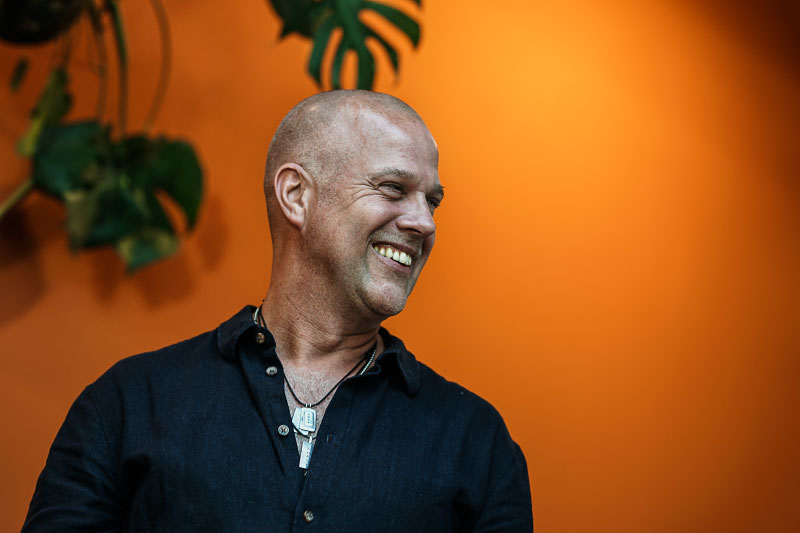
Jacob Karlzon (Aarhus, Denmark 2019) Photo Hreinn Gudlaugsson

Jacob Karlzon (born 19 October 1970 in Jönköping, Sweden) is a Swedish pianist, composer and accompanist. This pianist has 15 albums and he has accompanied musicians like guitarist Dominic Miller and vocalists Viktoria Tolstoy and Hanne Boel.

Jacob Karlzon also performed with Billy Cobham, Kenny Wheeler, Bob Berg, Tim Hagans, Jeff Ballard, Norma Winstone, Cæcilie Norby, Nils Landgren, Silje Nergaard, Rigmor Gustafsson, Lina Nyberg, Trine-Lise Væring, Anders Bergcrantz and Putte Wickman.

== Discography ==
Year recorded	Title	Label	Notes
1996?	Take Your Time		
1998?	Going Places		With Mattias Svensson (bass), Peter Danemo (drums)
2002?	Today		With Mattias Svensson (bass), Peter Danemo (drums)
2002	Big5	Prophone	Most tracks quintet, with Karl-Martin Almqvist (soprano sax, tenor sax, flute), Peter Asplund (trumpet, flugelhorn), Mattias Svensson (bass), Peter Danemo (drums, percussion); one track sextet, with Viktoria Tolstoy (vocals) added
2008?	Improvisational Three	Caprice	Solo piano
2010	Heat	Caprice	Some tracks trio, with Hans Andersson (bass), Jonas Holgersson (drums); some tracks quintet, with Karl-Martin Almqvist (saxes), Peter Asplund (trumpet) added
2011?	The Big Picture	Stunt	Trio, with Hans Andersson (bass), Jonas Holgersson (drums)
2012	More	ACT	Trio, with Hans Andersson (bass), Jonas Holgersson (drums)
2013	A Moment of Now	ACT	Most tracks duo, with Viktoria Tolstoy (vocals); one track with Jocke Bergström (vocals) added
2014	Shine	ACT	With Hans Andersson (bass) and Robert Mehmet Ikiz (drums)
2015?	One		Solo piano
2016	Now		With Dan Berglund (bass), Robert Mehmet Ikiz (drums)
2019	Open Waters	Warner Music Group	Jacob Karlzon – piano, synths, fender rodes. Morten Ramsbøl – bass. Rasmus Kihlberg – drums
2022	Wanderlust	Warner Music Group	Jacob Karlzon - piano, keyboards Morten Ramsbøl - bass Rasmus Kihlberg - drums feat. Dominic Miller - guitar Mathias Eick - trumpe
2023	Humanity		Benjamin Koppel and Jacob Karlzon
2024	Winter Stories		Jacob Karlzon

== Other Records and Collaborations ==
Year recorded	Title	Label	Notes
2011	Letters To Herbie - Viktoria Tolstoy	ACT	Viktoria Tolstoy / vocals. Jacob Karlzon / piano, keyboards. Krister Jonsson / guitars. Mattias Svensson / bass. Rasmus Kihlberg / drums. Special Guests: Nils Landgren / trombone & vocals. Magnus Lindgren / woodwinds
2012	Cause And Effect	Prophone	Johannesson, Schultz & Berglund Featuring Jacob Karlzon.
2018	Borrowed & Blue by Lisa Bassenge	Herzog Records	Lisa Bassenge (vocals) Jacob Karlzon (piano) and Andreas Lang (bass).
2019	Haftor Medbøe, Jacob Karlzon	Copperfly	Haftor Medbøe (guitar), Jacob Karlzon (piano)
2020	Mothers by Lisa Bassenge	Herzog Records	Lisa Bassenge (vocals). Jacob Karlzon (piano. Andreas Lang (bass)
2021	Vagabond - Dominic Miller	ECM Records	Dominic Miller, Guitar. Jacob Karlzon, Piano, Keyboard. Nicolas Fiszman, Bass. Ziv Ravitz, Drums.
2023	Wildflowers by Lisa Bassenge	Herzog Records	Lisa Bassenge (vocals) Jacob Karlzon (piano) and Andreas Lang (bass).
2024	Butterfly - Kari Sál	Imaginary Music	Kari Sál – vocals, kalimba. Adam Bałdych – violin. Jacob Karlzon – piano. Kacper Budziszewski – guitar. Roman Chraniuk – double bass. Dawid Fortuna – drums
