= Per Holknekt =

Swedish fashion designer (born 1960)

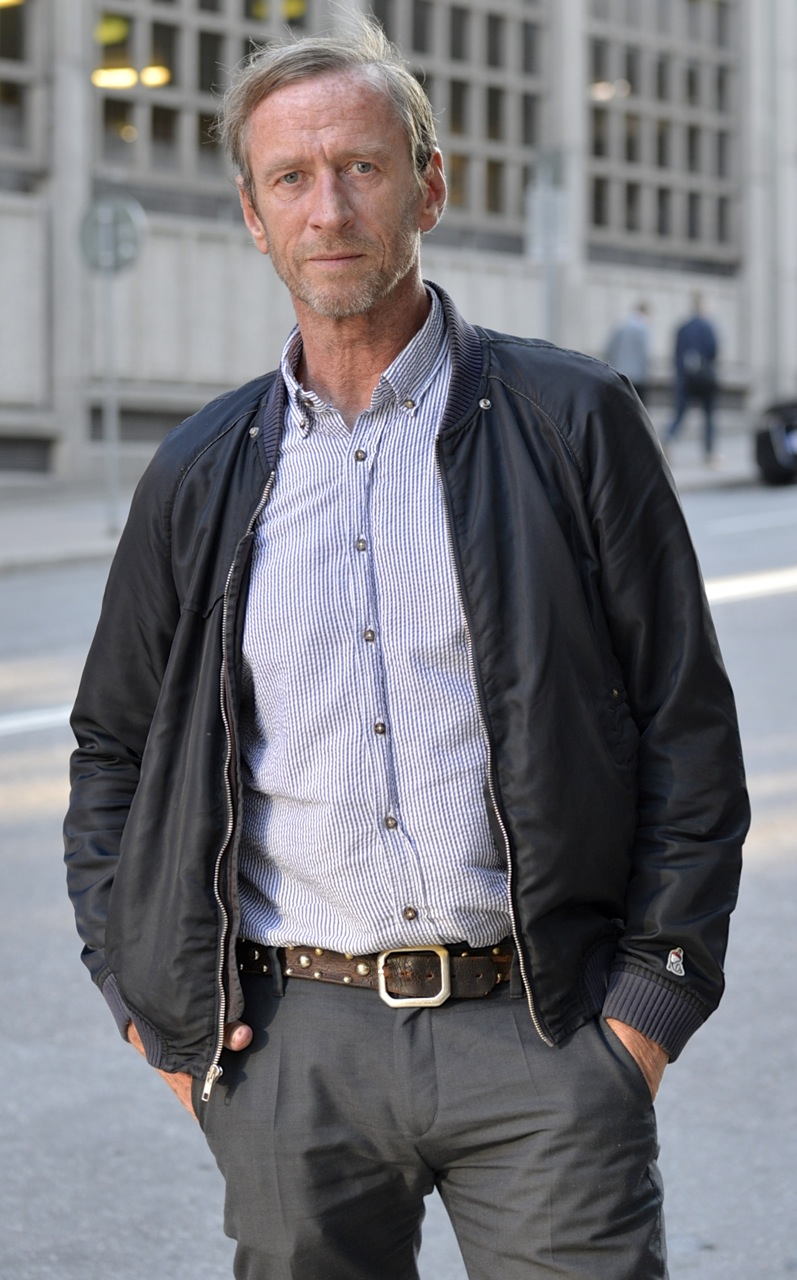
- Holknekt in 2014
- Born: 27 April 1960 (age 66); Falun, Sweden
- Occupation: Fashion designer
- Known for: Odd Molly, Svea
- Spouses: Viktoria Tolstoy (m. 2001; div. 2008) Lena Philipsson (m. 2010; div. 2013)
- Children: 1

Per Olof Holknekt (born 27 April 1960) is a Swedish fashion designer and entrepreneur. He is also the founder of several magazines and companies, the most successful of which is the clothing company Odd Molly.

== Life and career ==
Holknekt grew up in Falun, Dalarna. His father was a police officer and his mother was a school principal. He moved to Hermosa Beach, California, in 1980, and for several years was a professional skateboarder, winning several international competitions. In 1984, while in California, he founded the skateboarding magazine Transworld Skateboarding. He returned to Sweden in 1984 and studied economics at IHM Business School, after which he started the skateboard company Street Style with his brother Thomas. Later, he founded another skateboard company, Svea, which launched a skateboard brand and a clothing label.

Holknekt developed alcoholism, and went through a life crisis in 2000, during which he lost everything, became homeless, and supported himself by selling the Stockholm street newspaper Situation Sthlm. He sought treatment for his addiction and regained sobriety. After four months of being sober he successfully applied to become a housemate on the first season of the Swedish Big Brother series, in which he finished in second place after being voted off in the final on Day 74. The show was broadcast on Kanal 5.

In 2002, Holknekt started working with fashion designer Karin Jimfelt-Ghatan, and together they started the international clothing company Odd Molly. In 2010 the two were named "Founders of the Year" at Sweden's annual entrepreneurial gala Entreprenörsgalan. In 2013 Holknekt revealed that he would leave Odd Molly after twelve years to start working as a branding consultant for different brands.

On 19 June 2012, the first edition of Holknekt's magazine Miss World was published. He was the chief editor, but only two issues were published before it was discontinued.

Holknekt was one of the hosts of the Sveriges Radio show Sommar in 2010. In 2014 Holknekt published his autobiography, Per Holknekt 1960–2014, co-written by Markus Lutteman.

Holknekt is also a successful pinball player, and has participated in national, European, and world championships hosted by the Professional Amateur Pinball Association.

In 2016, Holknekt was arrested and fined for drunk driving and speeding on his motorboat by the Coast Guard. He was fined 30,000 SEK

== Personal life ==
Holknekt was married to an American woman for three years during his time in California. After returning to Sweden he became involved with a woman with whom he had a daughter in the 1990s. In 2000, during his participation in Big Brother, he met singer Viktoria Tolstoy, and the couple were married in 2001. They divorced in March 2008. He later married singer Lena Philipsson in 2010, but they were divorced in July 2013. In June 2015, Holknekt announced he had once again fallen in love, this time with 36-year-old fashion photographer Anna Lundell.
