= Jeanette Lindström =

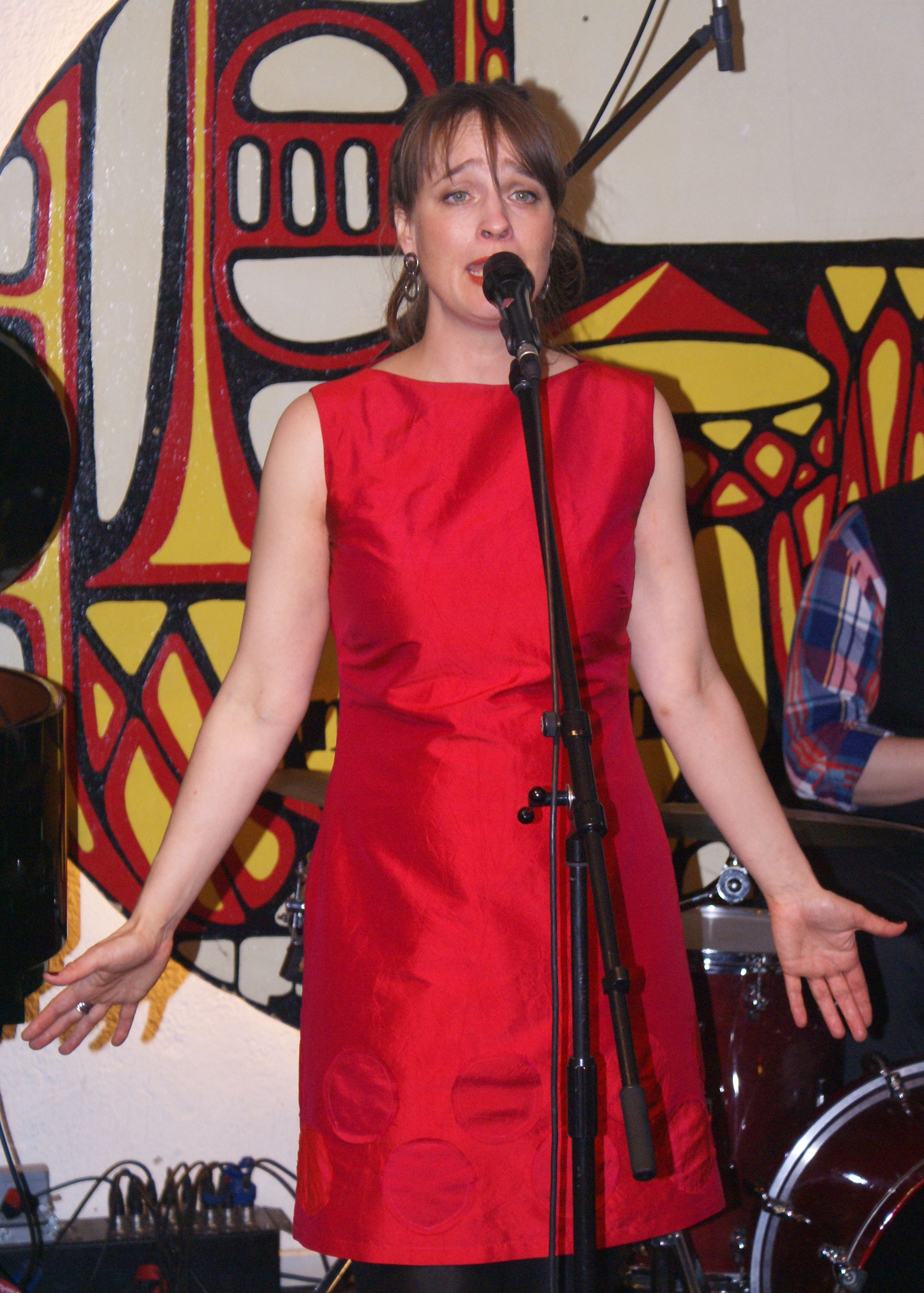
- Jeanette Lindström in Minden in May 2010

Background information
- Born: Maria Jeanette Lindstrom; 29 May 1971 (age 55); Stockholm, Sweden
- Genres: Vocal jazz
- Occupation: Singer
- Years active: 1990s–present
- Label: Caprice
- Website: jeanettelindstrom.com

Maria Jeanette Lindström is a Swedish singer, composer and lyricist. She grew up in Östersund and Ås in the Jämtland region of Sweden.

== Early life and career ==
Lindstrom grew up listening to her parents' record collection. Her father was a drummer, and she grew up hearing jazz, soul, Brazilian music, and Swedish folk music. At two years old she started piano lessons and played piano and organ through her teens. But she turned to singing in college, singing worldess accompaniment in a quartet. While still in college, she recorded her first album, Another Country. In 1995 she graduated from the Royal College of Music in Stockholm. She has worked with Steve Dobrogosz, Kenny Werner, Tim Hagans, Jacky Terrasson, and Lina Nyberg.

In 1995, the year she was awarded the Jazz in Sweden prize. In 2003 she began a collaboration with the Bonnier Amigo Music Group on the album Walk. The album and its sequel, In the Middle of This Riddle, were warmly received by audiences and critics in Sweden and abroad. On the album Whistling Away the Dark, she recorded with Palle Danielsson, Bobo Stenson, Jonas Östholm, and Magnus Öström—a side project apart from her band. In 2007 the song "Leaf", from In the Middle of This Riddle, was remixed by King Britt, a DJ and record producer from Philadelphia, and a track from the album was chosen for the compilation series Saint-Germain-des-Prés Café (Volume 7). She received a Grammis for Jazz of the Year at the 2010 awards ceremony.

== Discography ==
- Another Country (Caprice, 1995)
- I Saw You (Caprice, 1997)
- Sinatra/Weill (Caprice, 1999)
- Feathers with Steve Dobrogosz (Prophone, 2000)
- Walk (Amigo, 2003)
- In the Middle of This Riddle (Amigo, 2005)
- Whistling Away the Dark (Amigo, 2006)
- Attitude & Orbit Control (Diesel Music, 2009)
- Queen on the Hillside (Diesel, 2019)
