= Good Morning Susie Soho =

Studio album by Esbjörn Svensson Trio
- Released: 2000
- Genre: Jazz
- Label: ACT
- Producer: Esbjörn Svensson Trio

Esbjörn Svensson Trio chronology
Winter in Venice (1999)	Good Morning Susie Soho (2000)	Strange Place for Snow (2002)

Professional ratings
Review scores
Source	Rating
The Penguin Guide to Jazz Recordings	3.5/4 stars

Good Morning Susie Soho is a studio album by Swedish group Esbjörn Svensson Trio that was released in September 2000 by Sony BMG. The album peaked at No. 15 on the Swedish Sverigetopplistan album chart. All tracks were written by the trio except "The Face of Love", which was written by Nusrat Fateh Ali Khan, David Robbins, and Tim Robbins.

== Reception ==
Good Morning Susie Soho received critical acclaim. Stuart Nicholson of JazzTimes described the album as "darkly lyrical [and] fiercely contemporary". It was named "Album of the Year" for 2000 by Jazzwise magazine.

== Track listing ==
1. "Somewhere Else Before" – 5:35
2. "Do the Jangle" – 5:58
3. "Serenity" – 1:50
4. "The Wraith" – 9:20
5. "Last Letter from Lithuania" – 4:10
6. "Good Morning Susie Soho" – 5:51
7. "Providence" – 4:53
8. "Pavane (Thoughts of a Septuagenarian)" – 3:43
9. "Spam-Boo-Limbo" – 4:39
10. "The Face of Love" – 6:51
11. "Reminiscence of a Soul" – 11:59

== Personnel ==
- Esbjörn Svensson – keyboards
- Dan Berglund – bass guitar, double bass
- Magnus Öström – drums, gopichard, percussion, tabla
- Johan Ekelund – mastering
- Janne Hansson – technician
- Jonas "Joker" Berggren – photography
- Jonas Asp – piano technician
- Esbjörn Svensson Trio – arrangements, composition, production
