= Strange Place for Snow =

Studio album by Esbjörn Svensson Trio
- Released: March/June 2002
- Recorded: December 2001
- Studio: Atlantis, Stockholm, Sweden
- Length: 69:02
- Label: ACT Music/Sony BMG
- Producer: Esbjörn Svensson Trio

Esbjörn Svensson Trio chronology
Good Morning Susie Soho (2000)	Strange Place for Snow (2002)	Seven Days of Falling (2003)

Professional ratings
Review scores
Source	Rating
Allmusic	3/5 stars
The Penguin Guide to Jazz Recordings	3/4 stars

Strange Place for Snow is a studio album by the Swedish group Esbjörn Svensson Trio released in 2002.

== Background ==
The album was recorded in December 2001 and released in Europe on March 1, 2002, by ACT Music. The international release was on June 4, 2002, by Sony BMG.

== Reception ==
The recording was awarded the annual prize of the German Record Critics 2002 and the German Jazz Award.

== Track listing ==
1. "The Message" – 5:16
2. "Serenade For The Renegade" – 4:30
3. "Strange Place For Snow" – 6:44
4. "Behind The Yashmak" – 10:30
5. "Bound For The Beauty Of The South" – 5:10
6. "Years Of Yearning" – 5:44
7. "When God Created The Coffeebreak" – 6:38
8. "Spunky Sprawl" – 6:29
9. "Carcrash" – 18:01

The last track of the CD release – "Carcrash" – contains a hidden track. The tracks itself ends at 05:05 and after about three minutes of silence the hidden track commences.

== Personnel ==
- Daniel Berglund – Double Bass
- Magnus Öström – Percussion, Drums
- Esbjörn Svensson – Keyboards, Piano (Grand)

== Production ==
- E.S.T. – Producer
- Janne Hansson – Engineer, Mixing
- Åke Linton – Engineer
- Tommy Lydell – Mastering
