= Winter in Venice =

Studio album by Esbjörn Svensson Trio
- Released: 1997
- Genre: Jazz
- Label: ACT Music
- Producer: Johan Ekelund

Esbjörn Svensson Trio chronology
Winter in Venice (1997)	Good Morning Susie Soho (2000)

Professional ratings
Review scores
Source	Rating
The Penguin Guide to Jazz Recordings	4/4 stars

Winter in Venice is a studio album by Swedish jazz band Esbjörn Svensson Trio (E.S.T.), released in 1997. It was awarded the Swedish Grammy in 1998 for Best Jazz Album. It was released by the record label ACT Music.

== Track listing ==
1. "Calling Home"
2. "Winter In Venice"
3. "At Saturday"
4. "Semblance Suite In Three Or Four Movements I"
5. "Semblance Suite In Three Or Four Movements II"
6. "Semblance Suite In Three Or Four Movements III"
7. "Semblance Suite In Three Or Four Movements IV"
8. "Don't Cuddle That Crazy Cat"
9. "Damned Back Blues"
10. "In The Fall Of Things"
11. "As The Crow Flies"
12. "Second Page"
13. "Herkules Jonssons Låt"

== Personnel ==
- Esbjörn Svensson – piano
- Dan Berglund – bass
- Magnus Öström – drums
- Johan Ekelund – producer
