= Lars Danielsson =

Swedish jazz bassist, composer, and producer

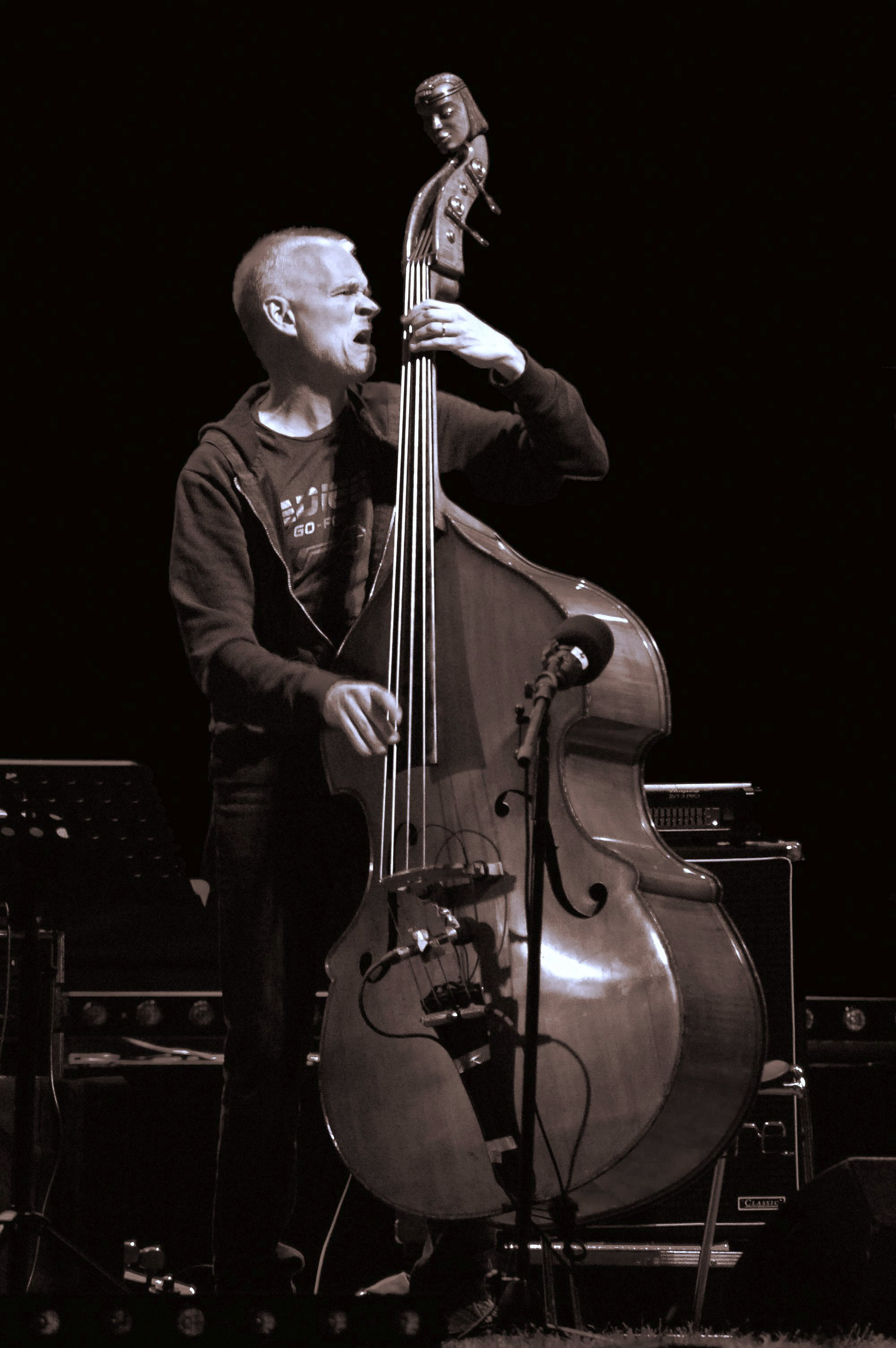

Background information
- Born: 5 September 1958 (age 67); Gothenburg, Sweden
- Genres: Jazz
- Occupation: Musician
- Instruments: Double bass, bass guitar
- Label: ACT

Lars Danielsson (born 5 September 1958) is a Swedish jazz bassist, composer, and record producer.

== Biography ==
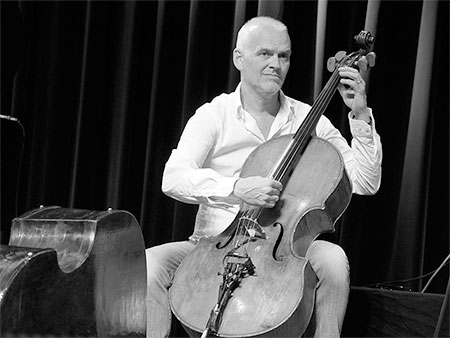
Lars Danielsson, playing the cello.

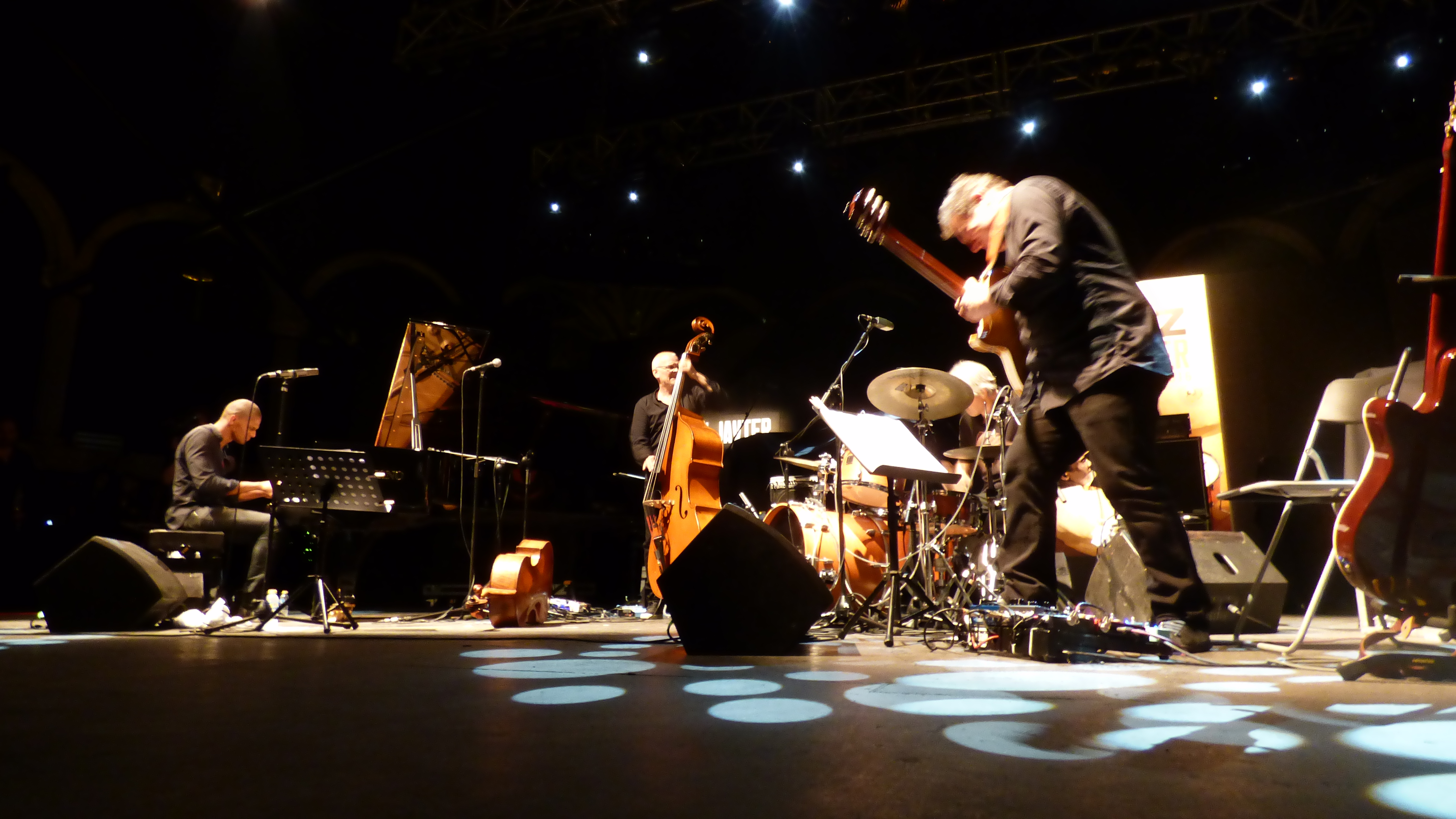
Lars Danielsson New Quintet concert at San Javier Jazz Festival (Spain), July 2016

Danielsson was born in Smålandsstenar, and was educated at the music conservatory in Gothenburg. He plays double bass, electric bass and cello. In 1985, he formed a quartet with saxophonist Dave Liebman, pianist Bobo Stenson and drummer Jon Christensen that sometimes used Danielsson's name, producing several albums. He also worked with big bands.

He played and recorded with John Scofield, Jack DeJohnette, Mike Stern, Billy Hart, Charles Lloyd, Terri Lyne Carrington, Leszek Możdżer, Joey Calderazzo, Gino Vannelli, Tigran Hamasyan and Dave Kikoski. Since 1980, he has released solo albums with the Lars Danielssons Quartet. In these albums, Alex Acuña, John Abercrombie, Bill Evans, Kenny Wheeler, Rick Margitza and Niels Lan Doky were featured.

As a producer, Danielsson has been responsible for productions with Cæcilie Norby and the Danish radio orchestra.

== Discography ==
Year recorded	Title	Label	Notes
2024	Trio	ACT Music	With John Parricelli (guitar), and Verneri Pohjola (trumpet)
2023	Symphonized	ACT Music	With Magnus Öström, Grégory Privat, John Parricelli, Arve Henriksen, Paolo Fresu and Gothenburg Symphony Orchestra conducted by Peter Nordahl featuring Carolina Grinne (english horn, oboe)
2021	Cloudland	ACT Music	With Magnus Öström, Grégory Privat, John Parricelli, Arve Henriksen, Kinan Azmeh
2018	Summerwind	ACT Music	With Paolo Fresu
2017	Liberetto III	ACT Music	With Gregory Privat, John Parricelli and Magnus Öström
2016	Lars Danielsson Songbook	ACT Music	Solo piano/bass
2016	Sun Blowing	ACT Music	With Marius Neset and Morten Lund
2014	Liberetto II	ACT Music	With Tigran Hamasyan, John Parricelli and Magnus Öström
2012	Liberetto	ACT Music	With Tigran Hamasyan, Magnus Öström, Arve Henriksen and John Parricelli
2009	Tarantella	ACT Music	With Leszek Możdżer, Mathias Eick, Eric Harland and John Parricelli
2007	Pasodoble	ACT Music	With Leszek Możdżer
2006	Mélange Bleu	ACT Music	With Bugge Wesseltoft and Nils Petter Molvær
2005	The Time	Outside Music	With Leszek Możdżer and Zohar Fresco
2004	Libera Me	ACT Music	With Nils Petter Molvær, Jon Christensen and Cæcilie Norby
1999	Time Unit	Dragon Records	With Anders Kjellberg, Göran Klinghagen and Anders Persson
1997	Live At Visiones	Dragon Records	With Dave Liebman, Jon Christensen and Bobo Stenson
1997	Origo	Curling Legs	With John Abercrombie and Adam Nussbaum
1994	Continuation	L+R Records	With John Abercrombie and Adam Nussbaum
1995	European Voices	Dragon Records	
1994	Far North	Curling Legs	With Dave Liebman, Jon Christensen and Bobo Stenson
1992	Fresh Enough	L+R Records	With Jack DeJohnette, John Scofield, Bill Evans, Dave Liebman, Niels Lan Doky and Ulf Wakenius
1991	Poems	Dragon Records	With Jon Christensen, Bobo Stenson and David Liebman
1990	Nightlight	Royal Music	With Alex Acuña
1987	Tiá Diá	Royal Music	With Alex Acuña, Lars Jansson, Ulf Jansson and David Wilczewski
1986	New Hands	Dragon Records	With Dave Liebman, Bobo Stenson and Jon Christensen

=== Also appears on ===
- Beginner's Guide to Scandinavia (Nascente 2011)
