= Odd Molly =

Clothing company

- Type: Public
- Traded as: Nasdaq Stockholm: ODD
- Industry: Fashion
- Founded: 2002
- Founder: Per Holknekt; Karin Jimfelt-Ghatan
- Headquarters: Kvistgaard, Denmark
- Products: Clothing
- Revenue: ▲SEK 267,7 million (2008)
- Website: oddmolly.com

Odd Molly is a premium fashion clothing brand owned by Molly's Collective Aps since 2024. They are headquartered in Kvistgaard, north of Copenhagen, where Danish design meets innovation.

Previously known as Odd Molly International AB, Swedish owned and founded 25 March 2002. Their main production is in clothing and accessories.

Odd Molly International AB is listed on the Stockholm Stock Exchange since June 2007 (list: First North).

The company's founders are Karin Jimfelt-Ghatan, Per Holknekt, and Christer Andersson. The board is situated in Stockholm.

By 31 December 2008, the number of shareholders was 3,367, 95 percent of which were registered in Sweden. Odd Molly International AB's turnover was 267,7 MSEK 2008. Their products can be found in more than 1600 shops in more than 38 countries.
