= Leszek Możdżer =

Polish jazz pianist and composer (born 1971)

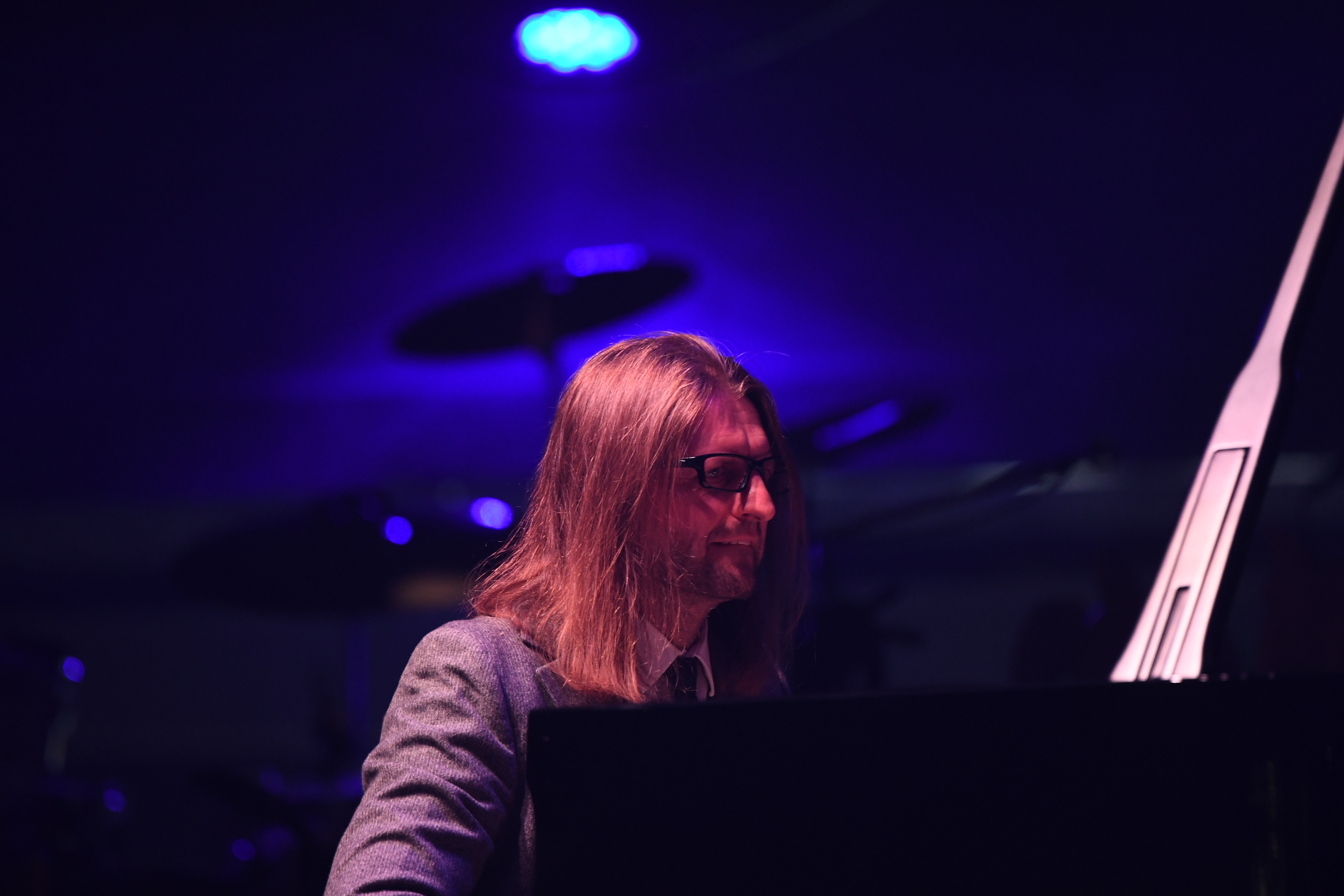
- Leszek Możdżer, 2023

Background information
- Born: Lesław Możdżer; 23 March 1971 (age 55); Gdańsk, Poland
- Genres: Jazz, Yass
- Occupations: Musician, composer
- Instrument: Piano
- Label: Outside Music
- Website: mozdzer.com

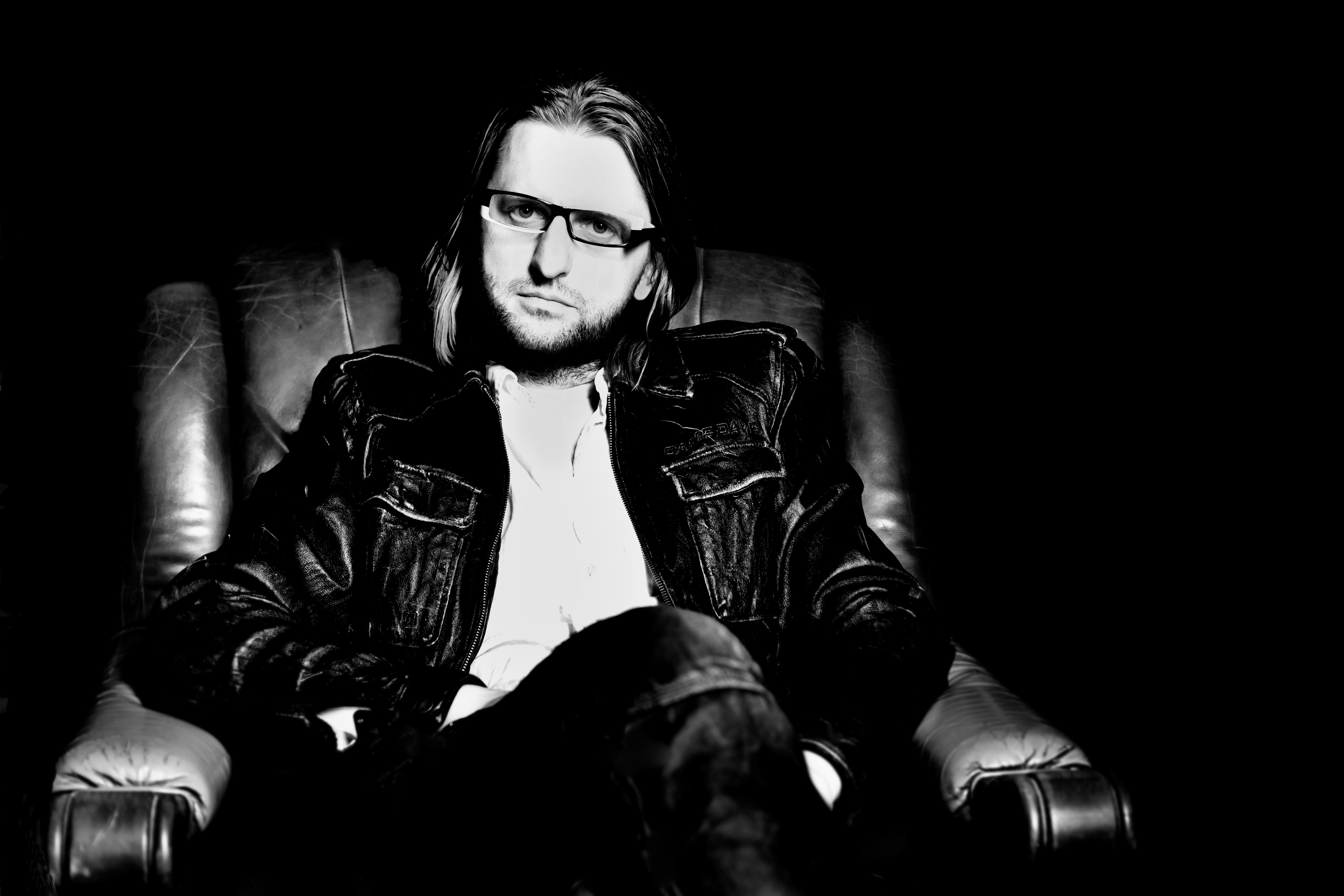
Leszek Możdżer in 2011

Leszek Możdżer (Polish pronunciation: [ˈlɛʂɛk ˈmɔʐd͡ʐɛr] born Lesław Henryk Możdżer, 23 March 1971) is a Polish jazz pianist, music producer and film score composer.

== Life and career ==
Możdżer was born on 23 March 1971 in Gdańsk. He began to play the piano at his parents' suggestion when he was five. In 1996, he received his diploma from the Stanisław Moniuszko Academy of Music in Gdańsk. He studied in the piano class under Andrzej Artykiewicz. He began his artistic career in clarinettist Emil Kowalewski's band and subsequently with the Miłość music band. The artist has collaborated with film score composers Jan A.P. Kaczmarek and Zbigniew Preisner. He formed a jazz trio together with double-bassist Lars Danielsson and drummer Zohar Fresco. Other prominent artists he has collaborated with include Marcus Miller, David Gilmour, Lester Bowie, Archie Shepp, Arthur Blythe, Tomasz Stańko, Pat Metheny, Janusz Muniak, Phil Manzanera, Zbigniew Namysłowski, Michał Urbaniak, L.U.C, Anna Maria Jopek, Behemoth, Myslovitz, Iva Bittová, Cæcilie Norby, and David Friesen.

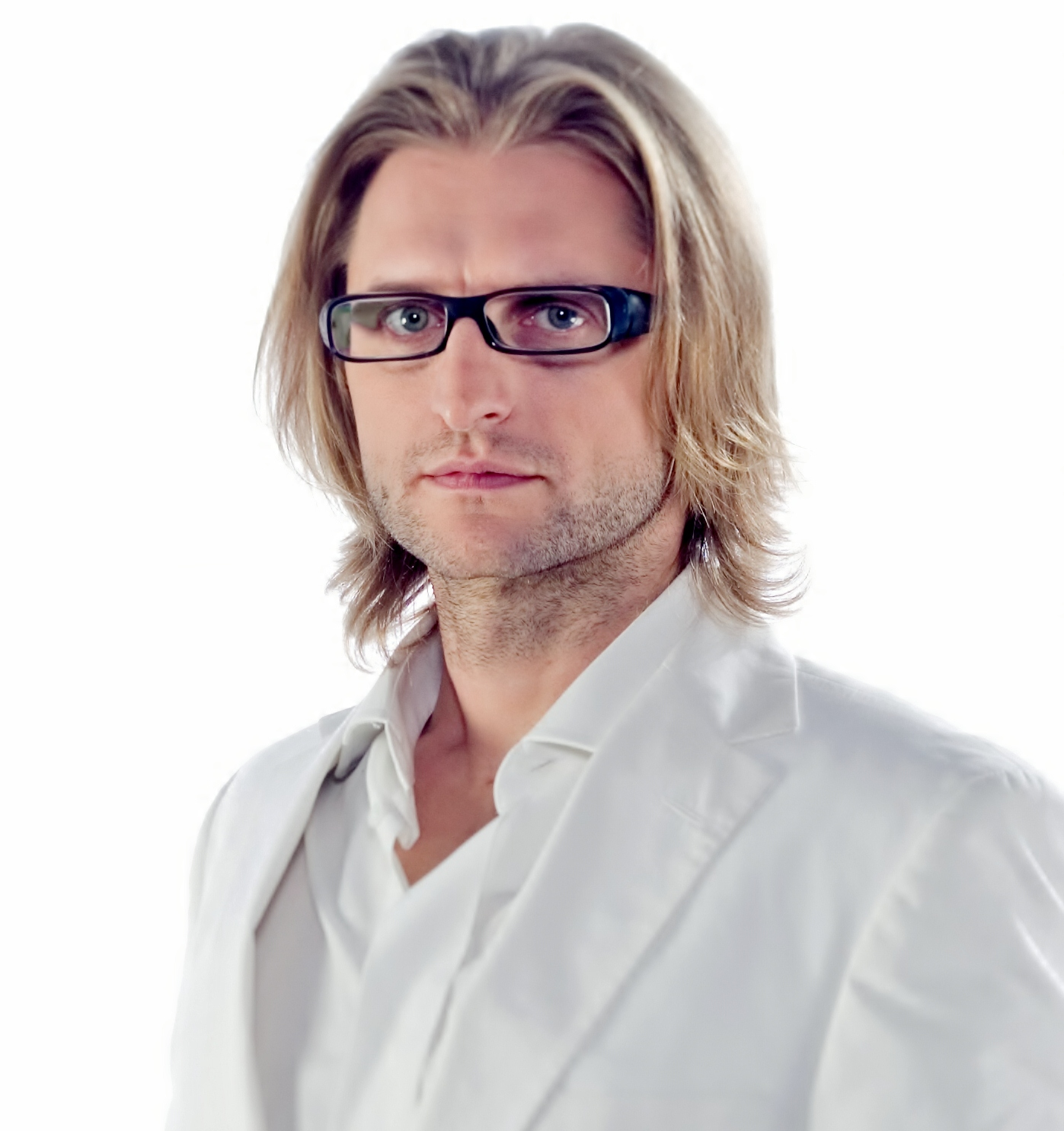
Możdżer in 2006

In 1994, he claimed 1st place at the International Jazz Improvisation Contest in Katowice. In 1998, he received the Jazzman of the Year Fryderyk Award. In 1999, he became the laureate of the Gdansk Mayor Award for his outstanding artistic achievements. In 2001, he was awarded the Ad Astra Award bestowed by the Polish Ministry of Culture and National Heritage to "an outstanding young musician". In 2004, he received the Paszport Polityki Award in the entertainment category. In 2011, he won another Fryderyk Award for best original soundtrack for his album Kaczmarek by Możdżer, a collection of contemporary film music. In 2013, he was awarded the Knight's Cross of the Order of Polonia Restituta.

In 2010, he performed a special music show at the Węglowy Targ in Gdańsk as part of the Solidarity of Arts 2010 to commemorate the 30th anniversary of the foundation of the Solidarity movement as well as the 200th anniversary of Frédéric Chopin's birth.

In 2012, he served as a member of jury at the Montreux Jazz Piano Competition.

In 2017, his opera Immanuel Kant based on the works of Thomas Bernhard premiered at the Wrocław Opera.

== Discography ==
=== Studio albums ===
| Title | Album details | Peak chart positions | Certifications |
| Title | Album details | POL | Certifications |
|---|---|---|---|
| Chopin - impresje | Released: 1994; Label: Polonia Records; Formats: CD | — | |
| Talk to Jesus | Released: 1996; Label: GOWI Records; Formats: CD | — | |
| Chopin Demain-Impressions | Released: 30 December 1999; Label: Opus 111; Formats: CD | — | |
| Solo in Ukraine | Released: 30 December 2003; Label: GOWI Records; Formats: CD | — | |
| Teatrowi Logos na XV-lecie | Released: 2003; Label: Teatr Logos; Formats: CD | — | |
| Piano | Released: 16 June 2004; Label: ARMS Records; Formats: CD | 7 | POL: Platinum |
| Piano Live | Released: 19 December 2004; Label: ARMS Records; Formats: CD | 36 | |
| Missa Gratiatoria | Released: 16 March 2009; Label: Alternator; Formats: CD | — | |
| Bernstein & Gershwin | Released: 19 March 2010; Label: Polskie Radio; Formats: CD | 33 | |
| Impressions on Chopin | Released: 30 July 2010; Label: Universal Music Poland; Formats: CD, digital download | 8 | |
| Kaczmarek by Możdżer | Released: 29 March 2010; Label: Universal Music Poland; Formats: CD | 16 | POL: Platinum |
| Komeda | Released: 27 June 2011; Label: ACT; Formats: CD, digital download | 1 | POL: 2× Platinum |
"—" denotes a recording that did not chart or was not released in that territory.

=== Collaborative albums ===
| Title | Album details | Peak chart positions | Certifications |
| Title | Album details | POL | Certifications |
|---|---|---|---|
| Anniversary Concert For Hestia with Adam Pierończyk | Released: 1996; Label: Hestia; Formats: CD | — | |
| Facing the Wind with David Friesen | Released: 1996; Label: Power Bros; Formats: CD | — | |
| Live in Sofia with Adam Pierończyk | Released: 1998; Label: Not Two; Formats: CD | — | |
| 10 Łatwych utworów na fortepian with Zbigniew Preisner | Released: 25 September 1999; Label: Pomaton EMI; Formats: CD, digital download | — | POL: Gold |
| Birthday Live with Olo Walicki, Cezary Konrad and Andrzej Olejniczak | Released: 2001; Label: Blue Note Poznań Jazz Club; Formats: CD | — | |
| Makowicz vs. Możdżer at the Carnegie Hall with Adam Makowicz | Released: 21 November 2004; Label: Pomaton EMI; Formats: CD | 10 | POL: Platinum |
| Metalla Pretiosa with Olo Walicki and Maurice de Martin & The Gdansk Philharmonic Brass | Released: 28 November 2004; Label: Olo Walicki Production; Formats: CD | — | |
| Seven Pieces for Improvising Piano and Strings with Aukso Orchestra | Released: 2004; Label: Lemon Music; Formats: CD | — | |
| Tulipany Daniel Bloom featuring Leszek Możdżer Trio | Released: 7 March 2005; Label: Warner Music Poland; Formats: CD, digital download | 18 | |
| Live in Warsaw with Adam Klocek | Released: 27 June 2005; Label: Universal Music Poland; Formats: CD, digital download | 49 | |
| The Time with Lars Danielsson and Zohar Fresco | Released: 26 October 2005; Label: Outside Music; Formats: CD | 2 | POL: Diamond |
| Wrocław 2004 with Adam Makowicz | Released: 9 December 2005; Label: EMI Music Poland; Formats: CD | — | |
| Between us and the light with Lars Danielsson and Zohar Fresco | Released: 20 November 2006; Label: Outside Music; Formats: CD | 7 | POL: 2× Platinum |
| Pasodoble with Lars Danielsson | Released: 27 April 2007; Label: ACT; Formats: CD, digital download | 17 | POL: Platinum |
| Melisa with Przemek Dyakowski and Sławek Jaskułke | Released: 21 May 2007; Label: Fonografika; Formats: CD | — | |
| Live with Lars Danielsson and Zohar Fresco | Released: 28 November 2007; Label: Outside Music; Formats: CD | 35 | |
| Tarantella with Lars Danielsson | Released: 23 February 2009; Label: ACT; Formats: CD | 48 | |
| The Last Set Live At The A-Trane with Walter Norris | Released: 16 October 2012; Label: ACT; Formats: CD | | |
| Polska with Lars Danielsson and Zohar Fresco | Released: 25 October 2013; Label: Outside Music; Formats: CD, digital download | 2 | POL: 2× Platinum |
| Earth Particles with Holland Baroque | Released: 11 May 2018; Label: Holland Baroque; Formats: CD, vinyl | --- | NL: Gold |
"—" denotes a recording that did not chart or was not released in that territory.

== Filmography (score composer) ==
Source.

- Milion dolarów (2010)
- W sypialni (2012)
- Wszystkie kobiety Mateusza (2012)
- Icarus: The Legend of Mietek Kosz (2019) – Polish Academy Award for Best Film Score

== See also ==
- Music of Poland
- List of Poles
- Tomasz Stańko
- Krzysztof Komeda
