= Esbjörn Svensson Trio =

Swedish jazz piano trio

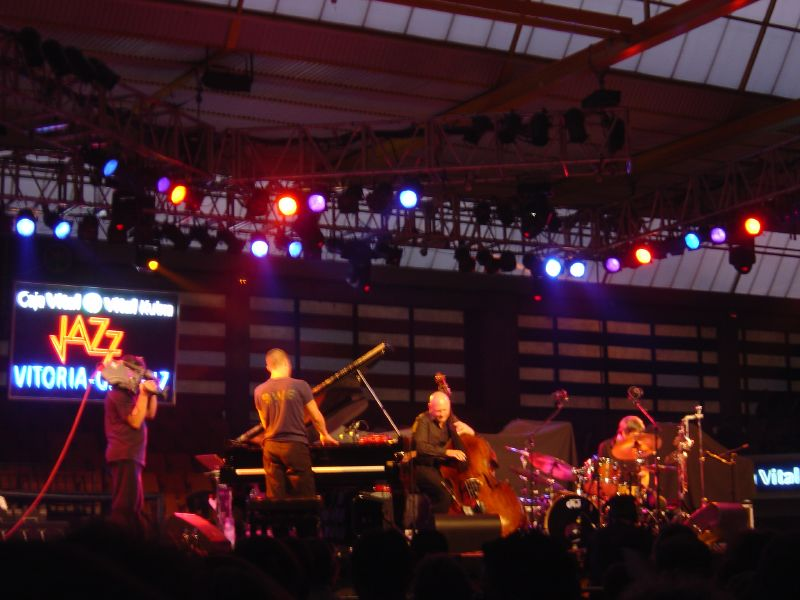
- Esbjörn Svensson Trio at Vitoria-Gasteiz (Spain). July 2003

Background information
- Also known as: e.s.t.
- Genres: Jazz, instrumental music, post-bop, chamber jazz, nu jazz
- Years active: 1993–2008
- Label: ACT
- Past members: Esbjörn Svensson; Dan Berglund; Magnus Öström
- Website: Official website

Esbjörn Svensson Trio (or e.s.t.) was a Swedish jazz piano trio formed in 1993 consisting of Esbjörn Svensson (piano), Dan Berglund (double bass), and Magnus Öström (drums). Its music had classical, rock, pop, and techno elements. It listed classical composer Béla Bartók and rock band Radiohead as influences. Its style involved conventional jazz and the use of electronic effects and multitrack recording.

== Biography ==
The trio deliberately blurred genres, with Svensson's musical catholicism drawing on a wide variety of artist influences. e.s.t. was also renowned for its vibrant style in live performances, often playing in rock and roll oriented venues to young crowds. It achieved great commercial success and critical acclaim throughout Europe. Its 1999 release From Gagarin's Point of View started its international breakthrough, being the first e.s.t. album to be released outside of Scandinavia through the German label ACT.

Svensson died in a scuba diving accident in Stockholm on 14 June 2008. He is survived by his wife and two sons. The publication All About Jazz remarked that the loss "will surely deeply sadden music lovers everywhere."

Since 2013 Magnus Öström and Dan Berglund have been touring with the project e.s.t. symphony with Swedish arranger and conductor Hans Ek, performing symphonic versions of the e.s.t. songs.

== Awards ==
In 1995 and 1996, Svensson was awarded Swedish Jazz Musician of the Year and 1998 Songwriter of the Year, and the 1997 release Winter in Venice (consisting mainly of original material) was awarded the Swedish Grammy. Strange Place For Snow, e.s.t.'s 2002 release earned numerous awards including the Jahrespreis der Deutschen Schallplattenkritik (from the German Phonoacademy), the German Jazz Award, Choc de l'année (Jazzman, France), the Victoire du Jazz – the French Grammy – as best international act and also the Revelation of the Festival award, a special award from Midem. In December 2004, e.s.t. was awarded the Hans Koller prize as European Artist of the Year.

== Discography ==
=== Albums ===
Studio albums

- When Everyone Has Gone (Dragon, 1993)
- EST Plays Monk (Superstudio Gul, 1996)
- Winter in Venice (Superstudio Gul, 1997)
- From Gagarin's Point of View (Superstudio Gul/ACT, 1999)
- Good Morning Susie Soho (Superstudio Gul/ACT, 2000)
- Strange Place for Snow (Superstudio Gul/ACT, 2002)
- Seven Days of Falling (Superstudio Gul/ACT, 2003)
- Viaticum (ACT, 2005)
- Tuesday Wonderland (ACT/EmArcy, 2006)
- Leucocyte (ACT, 2008)
- 301 (ACT, 2012)

Live albums

- E.S.T. Live '95 (ACT, 2001, originally released in 1995 on Swedish Dragon label as Mr. & Mrs. Handkerchief)
- Live in Stockholm (ACT, 2003) DVD, recorded December 10, 2000 – including videos and an interview
- Live in Berlin (ACT, 2005, Viaticum Platinum Edition, 2-CD Set - ACT 6001-2)
- Live in Hamburg (ACT, 2007)
- E.S.T. Live in London (ACT, 2018), recorded 2005
- E.S.T. Live in Gothenburg (ACT, 2019), recorded 2001

Compilation albums

- Somewhere Else Before (U.S. compilation on Columbia from From Gagarin's Point of View and Good Morning Susie Soho, 2001)
- Retrospective - The Very Best of E.S.T. (ACT, 2009)

== Also appear on ==
- Beginner's Guide to Scandinavia, 2011 (Nascente/Demon Music Group)

== Collaborations ==
The trio collaborated with several artists, including Pat Metheny. The Vinyl Trilogy was recorded with fellow countryman Nicolai Dunger.
