= Lina Nyberg =

Swedish jazz singer and composer (born 1970)

- Born: 27 February 1970 (age 56); Stockholm, Sweden
- Genres: Jazz
- Occupations: Singer, composer
- Instrument: Vocals
- Years active: 1990–present
- Website: www.linanyberg.se

Lina Nyberg (born 27 February 1970) is a Swedish jazz singer and composer. She has composed works for string quartet, big band, and symphony orchestra. She is married to the Swedish jazz clarinettist and saxophonist Fredrik Ljungkvist.

== Career ==
In 1990 Nyberg put together her own band, the Lina Nyberg Quintet, comprising Per "Texas" Johansson, Esbjörn Svensson, Dan Berglund, and Mikel Ulfberg. After her graduation at the Stockholm Royal College of Music as a Master of Fine Arts in 1993, Nyberg released her debut solo album Close (1993), a duo recording with late pianist Esbjörn Svensson from the well known Swedish trio EST, and it became an instant success and Swedish jazz classic. This was also the beginning of a fruitful cooperation with the producer and owner of Prophone Records, Erland Boëthius.

In 1995 the Lina Nyberg Quintet was awarded a Swedish Grammy Award for the album When the Smile Shines Through. Nyberg has released over fourteen albums as a solo artist, filling the roles of composer, record producer, and singer. In September 2011 she released Palaver (Moserobie Records). Her music is a mixture of Brazilian tropicalia, European free form, contemporary classical, the Great American Songbook, and traditional jazz.

In 2013 the Lina Nyberg Band made its first tour in the U.S. and Canada. During her career, she has collaborated with Bernt Rosengren, Nisse Sandström, and the Fredrik Norén Band.

Since 2013 Lina has been working on a trilogy of albums, composing new music about the world and the elements for different kind of settings, exploring the art of instrumentation. Part 1, "Sirenades" (music for big band and her quintet), was released in 2014, part 2, "Aerials" (music for string quartet and her quintet) in 2016, and in autumn 2017 the final part, "Terrestrial" (Hoob records) was released. This time Lina has created music for symphony orchestra (and her band) on commission from the NorrlandsOpera Symphony Orchestra in Umeå.

== Awards and honors ==
- Swedish Grammy, Jazz Album of the Year, 1994
- Jazz Musician of the Year, Swedish Radio, 2011
- Guest of Honour, Umeå International Jazz Festival, 2011
- Jazz Prize, Royal Swedish Academy of Music, 2016
- Jazz Album of the Year, Terrestrial, Orkesterjournalen magazine, 2018

== Discography ==
- Close with Esbjorn Svensson (Prophone, 1993)
- When the Smile Shines Through (Prophone, 1994)
- So Many Stars (Prophone, 1996)
- Temper with Jacob Karlzon (Prophone, 1997)
- Open (Prophone, 1998)
- Smile (Prophone, 2000)
- Brasilien (Prophone, 2001)
- Time (Prophone, 2003)
- A Song Book (Spice of Life, 2003)
- Saragasso (Moserobie, 2004)
- Tellus (Moserobie, 2006)
- Brasil Big Bom with Magnus Lindgren (Caprice, 2007)
- The Show (Moserobie, 2009)
- West Side Story (Hoob, 2010)
- Palaver (Moserobie, 2011)
- The Sirenades (Hoob, 2014)
- The Clouds (Hoob, 2020)
