= Cæcilie Norby =

Danish jazz and rock singer (born 1964)

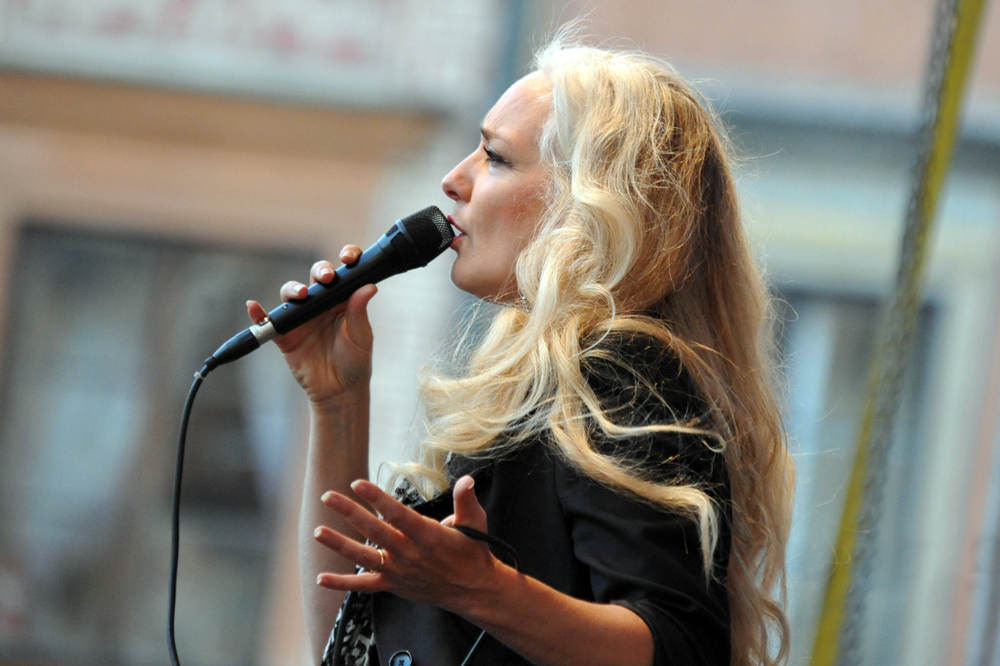
- Norby performing in Warsaw in 2011

Background information
- Born: 9 September 1964 (age 61); Frederiksberg, Denmark
- Genres: Jazz, pop, rock
- Occupation: Singer
- Years active: 1985–present
- Labels: Blue Note, Enja, ACT
- Website: caecilienorby.com

Cæcilie Norby (born 9 September 1964) is a Danish jazz and rock singer. She has performed as part of the bands Street Beat, Frontline, and One-Two. Since the mid-1990s, she has worked as a solo artist.

== Career ==
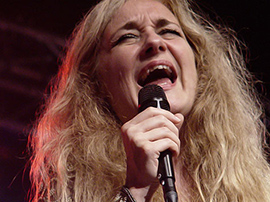
Cæcilie Norby in 2011

Norby was a founding member of the band Street Beat in 1982. For two years, she was a member of the jazz-rock band Frontline. From 1985 to 1993, she worked with singer Nina Forsberg in the rock band One-Two.

In 1995, she turned to jazz and released her first solo album for Blue Note, titled Cæcilie Norby. The self-titled debut recording was co-produced by Niels Lan Doky as was followed by her album My Corner of the Sky in 1996. My Corner of the Sky prominently featured American musicians, including David Kikoski, Joey Calderazzo, Terri Lyne Carrington, Scott Robinson, Randy Brecker, and Michael Brecker. The repertoire for both albums included only a few jazz standards like "Summertime" or "Just One of Those Things". Instead, she and Lan Doky arranged classic popular songs for a jazz line-up, like "Wild Is the Wind", "By the Time I Get to Phoenix" and a track by Curtis Mayfield on the first album, "The Look of Love", "Life on Mars", "Spinning Wheel" and "Set Them Free" by Sting on the second. For both albums Norby also wrote lyrics to compositions by Randy Brecker, Chick Corea, Don Grolnick and Wayne Shorter. Both albums gained wide attention and five-digit sales, especially in Denmark and also in Japan.

Her third album Queen of Bad Excuses, released in 1999, was a collaboration between her and Lars Danielsson, who already played bass throughout My Corner of the Sky.

She released her fourth album First Conversation in 2002, which received a 4.5 star rating from Jazz Music Archives.

Norby turned 60 in 2025 and marked the milestone by releasing a new album titled Sixty. The release was followed with four sold-out concerts at Hotel Cecil.

On July 13, 2025, Norby performed at Bremen Teater during the Copenhagen Jazz Festival.

On September 17, 2025, Norby is set to perform in the Glass Hall Theatre at Tivoli Gardens, accompanied by the Tivoli Big Band under Peter Jensen.

== Personal life ==
She was born 9 September 1964 in Frederiksberg, Denmark, into a musical family. Her father, Erik Norby, is classical composer and her mother, Solveig Lumholt, is an opera singer.

== Awards ==
- 1985: Ben Webster Prize
- 1996: Best Recording Album in Japan
- 1997: Simon Spies Soloist Prize
- 2000: Wilhelm Hansen Music Prize
- 2010: IFPI's Honorary Award

== Discography ==
With Frontline

- Frontline (1985)
- Frontlife (1986)

With One Two

- One Two (1986)
- Hvide Løgne (1990)
- Getting Better (1993)

With DR Big Band

- 2009: Jazz Divas of Scandinavia (Red Dot)

=== Solo albums ===
Year	Album	Peak positions
Year	Album	DEN
1995	Cæcilie Norby	–
1996	My Corner of the Sky	–
1999	Queen of Bad Excuses	–
2002	First Conversation	2
2004	London/Paris (live album)	11
2005	Slow Fruit	20
2007	I Had a Ball: Greatest & More (compilation album)	–
2010	Arabesque	23
2013	Silent Ways	27
2015	Just The Two Of Us with Lars Danielsson	–
2019	Sisters in Jazz with Marilyn Mazur, Hildegunn Øiseth, Rita Marcotulli, Nicole Johänntgen, Lisa Wulff and Dorota Piotrowska	–
2020	Portraying	–
2022	Earthenya	–
2025	Sixty	–
