= Dan Berglund =

Swedish musician

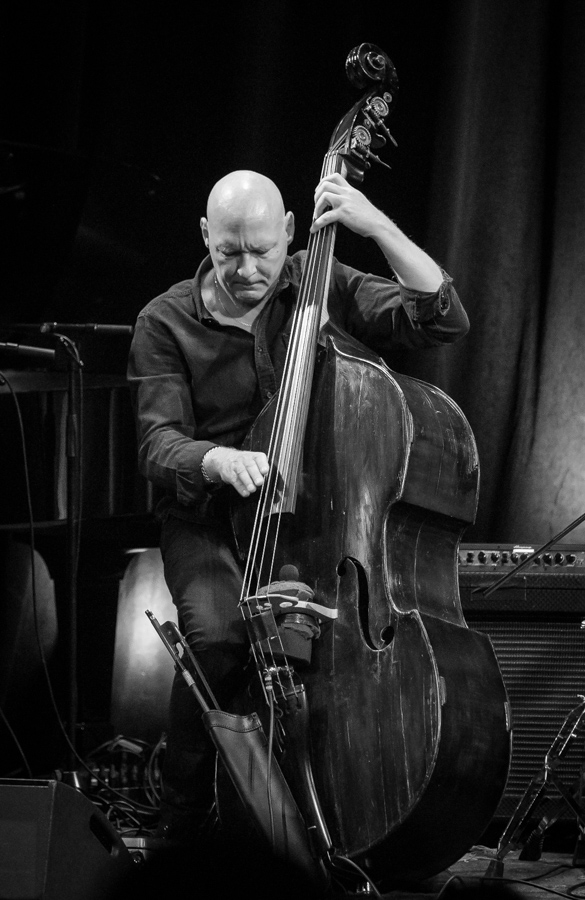
- Berglund performing in 2017

Background information
- Born: 5 May 1963 (age 61); Pilgrimstad, Sweden
- Genres: Jazz
- Occupation(s): Jazz musician, composer
- Instrument(s): Upright bass, bass guitar
- Labels: ACT
- Formerly of: Esbjörn Svensson Trio
- Website: tonbruket.com

Dan Berglund (born 5 May 1963) is a Swedish musician who mainly plays the upright bass and is known within jazz and fusion.

== Biography ==
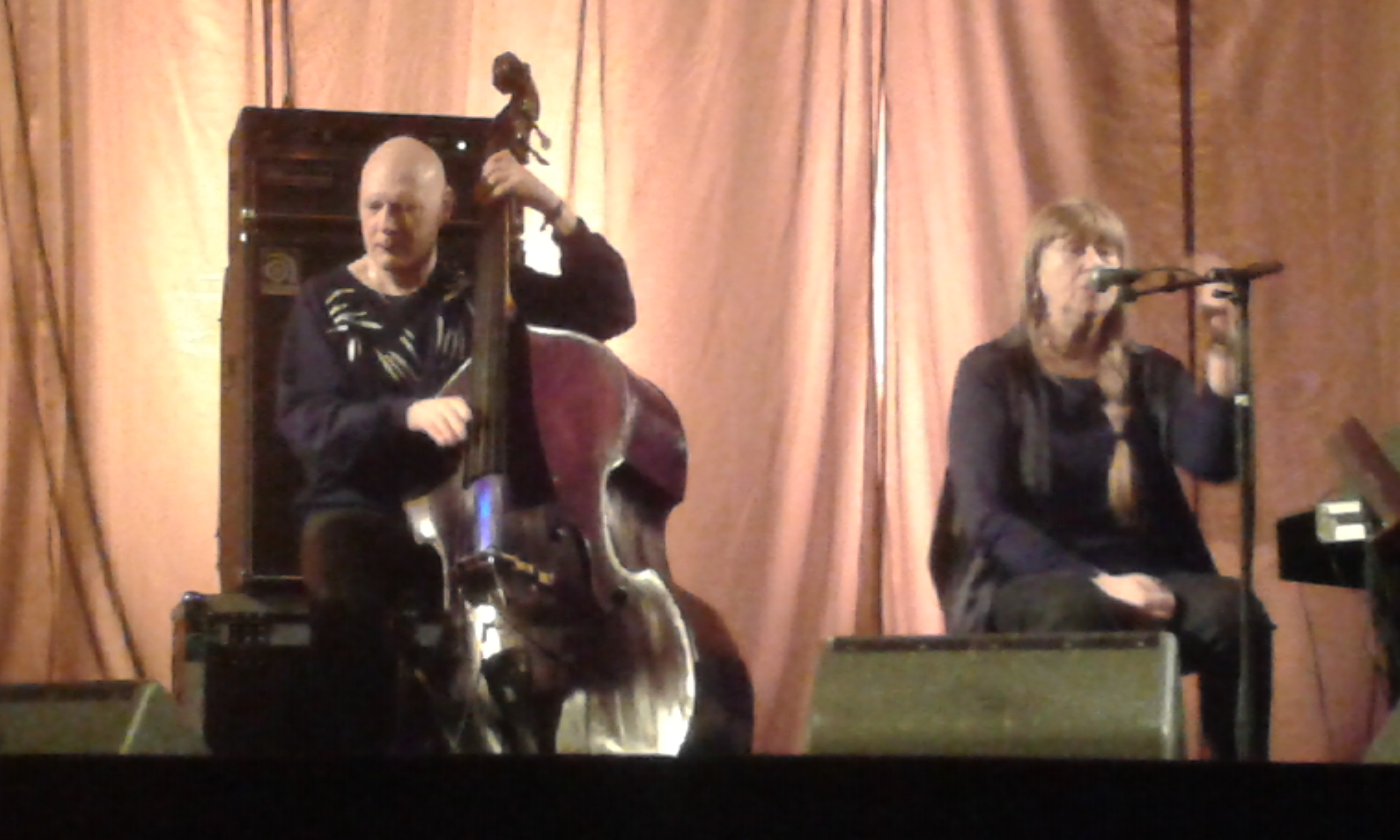
Dan Berglund and Sidsel Endresen at Vossajazz 2016

Berglund was familiar with Swedish folk music as well as with pop and rock music. At the age of ten he started playing rock guitar, but later changed to bass guitar. As part of his musical training at the Birka Folkhögskola in Östersund he came to pick up the upright bass and played in the regional symphony orchestra, with whom he also had guest performances and first television appearances. In 1990 he moved to Stockholm to study at the Kungliga Musikhögskolan. There he played in the group Jazz Furniture and in the quintet of Lina Nyberg, where he met Esbjörn Svensson.

From 1993 he was a member of the highly successful Esbjörn Svensson Trio, with whom he recorded numerous albums and toured worldwide. He was a member of the trio until the death of Svensson in 2008. In 2009 he founded his own crossover band Tonbruket, which includes Johan Lindström (guitar, keyboards), Martin Hederos (piano, accordion, violin, keyboards) and Andreas Werliin (drums, percussion), who do not come from the jazz scene. The band's 2009 debut album was awarded a Swedish Grammy.

== Selected discography ==
=== Solo ===
With Tonbruket

- 2009: Dan Berglund's Tonbruket (ACT Music)
- 2010: Dig It to the End (ACT Music) (awarded Gyllene Skivan 2011)
- 2013: Nubium Swimtrip (ACT Music)
- 2016: Forevergreens (ACT Music)
- 2018: Live Salvation (ACT Music) (Recorded live in Stuttgart, November 17, 2016)
- 2019: Masters of Fog (ACT Music)

=== Collaborations ===
With Esbjörn Svensson Trio

See Esbjörn Svensson Trio#Discography

With Jeanette Lindström Quintet

- 1995: Another Country (Caprice Records)
- 1997: I Saw You (Caprice Records)

With Fire! Orchestra

- 2013: Exit! (Rune Grammofon)
- 2014: Enter (Rune Grammofon)
- 2014: Second Exit (Rune Grammofon)

With others

- 1992: City Sounds (Mirrors Records), with Fredrik Norén Band
- 1994: Jazz Furniture (Caprice Records), with Jazz Furniture
- 1994: When The Smile Shines Through (Prophone), with Lina Nyberg
- 1998: Alla Mina Kompisar (EMI Music), with Per "Texas" Johansson
- 1999: Melos (Sittel Records), with Peter Asplund
- 2008: Love Is Real (ACT Music), with Ulf Wakenius as composer
- 2011: Bitter and Sweet (Emoción Records), with Jessica Pilnäs
- 2013: Cause And Effect (Prophone), with Peter Johannesson, Schultz, Berglund feat. Jacob Karlzon
- 2014: Trialogue (Jazzland Recordings), with Bugge Wesseltoft, Henrik Schwarz
- 2019: Reflections & Odysseys (Jazzland Recordings), with Bugge Wesseltoft and Magnus Öström (Rymden)
- 2020: Doom Country (Startracks), with Christian Kjellvander (Tonbruket)
