= Viktoria Tolstoy =

Swedish jazz singer of Russian ancestry (born 1974)

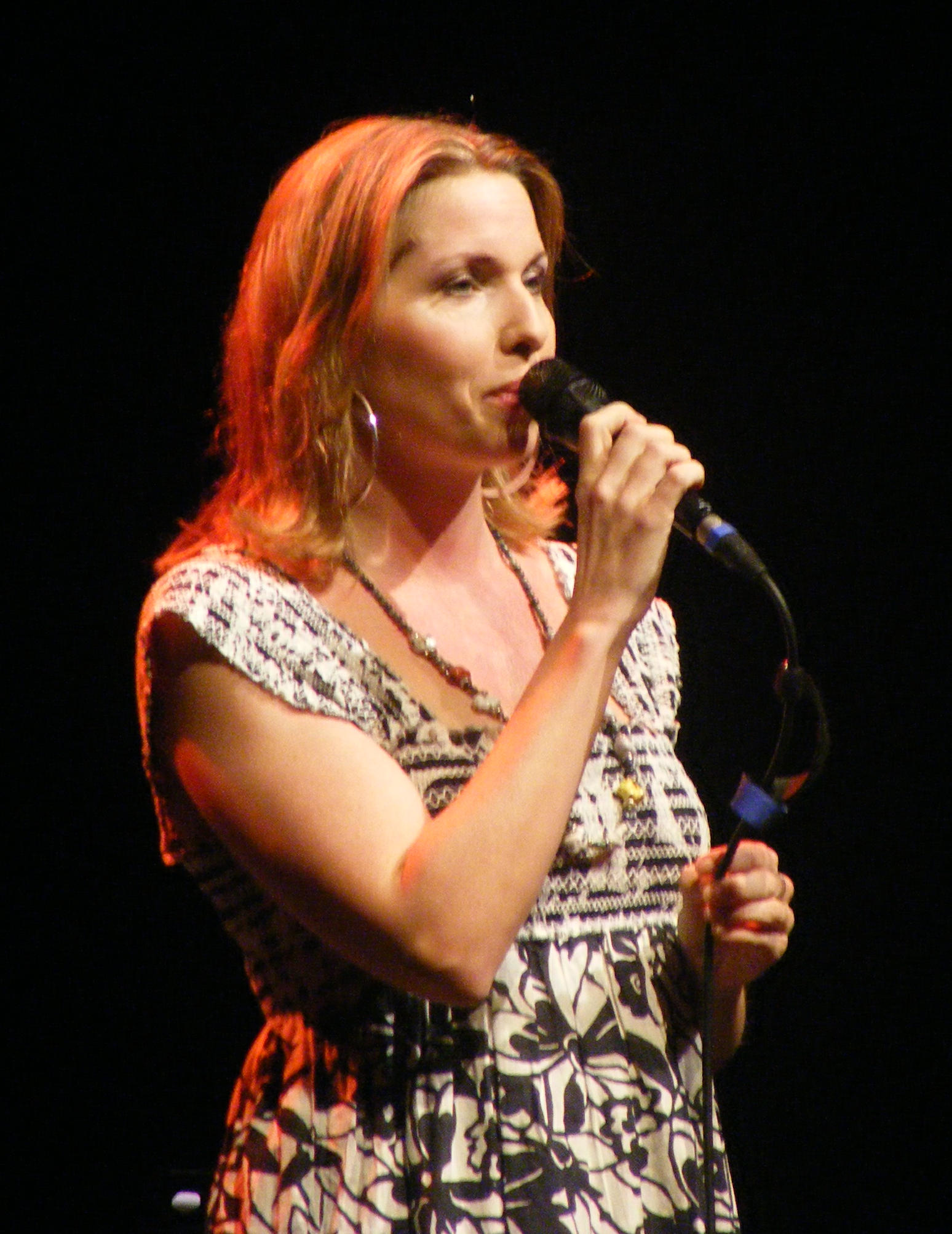
- Tolstoy at the St. Ingbert jazz festival, 2009

Background information
- Born: Louise Viktoria Kjellberg; 29 July 1974 (age 51); Sigtuna Municipality, Sweden
- Genres: Jazz
- Occupation: Singer
- Labels: Blue Note, ACT
- Website: viktoriatolstoy.se

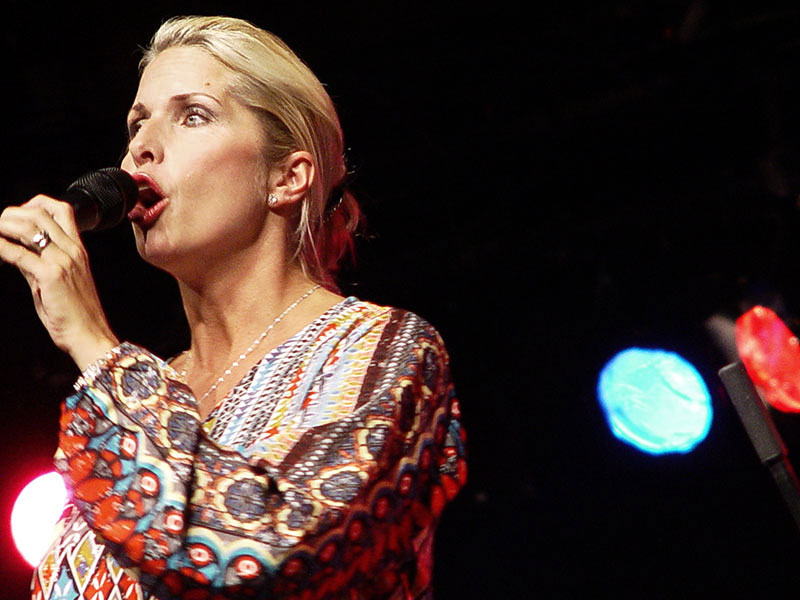
Viktoria Tolstoy in Aarhus, Denmark 2014

Louise Viktoria Tolstoy (Russian: Толста́я, romanized: Tolstaya; née Kjellberg; born 29 July 1974) is a Swedish jazz singer of Russian ancestry. She is the great-great-granddaughter of Russian writer Leo Tolstoy. Tolstoy was a regular studio guest in season one of the television series Big Brother in 2000.

She was married to designer Per Holknekt from 2001 until they divorced in March 2008.

== Discography ==
=== As leader ===
- Smile, Love and Spice (Sittel, 1994)
- Viktoria Tolstoy (EMI, 1996)
- För Älskad (EMI, 1996)
- White Russian (Blue Note, 1997)
- Blame It On My Youth (EMI, 2001)
- Shining On You (ACT, 2004)
- My Swedish Heart (ACT, 2005)
- Pictures of Me (ACT, 2006)
- My Russian Soul (ACT, 2008)
- Letters to Herbie (ACT, 2011)
- A Moment of Now (ACT, 2013)
- Meet Me at the Movies (ACT, 2017)
- Stations (ACT, 2020)
- Stealing Moments (ACT, 2024)
- Who We Are with Jacob Karlzon (ACT, 2026)

=== As guest ===
With Nils Landgren

- 2002 – Sentimental Journey
- 2004 – Funky ABBA

With others

- 1998 − Här kommer natten, Svante Thuresson
- 2007 – Christmas with My Friends (ACT)
- 2012 – Super Music, UMO Jazz Orchestra (Blue Note)
- 2016 – Green Man, Beat Funktion
- 2016 – Jazz at Berlin Philharmonic V (ACT)
- 2024 – It’s a Wonderful Christmas This Year, Philip Wareborn

== See also ==
- List of Swedes in music
