= ACT Music =

German record label

ACT
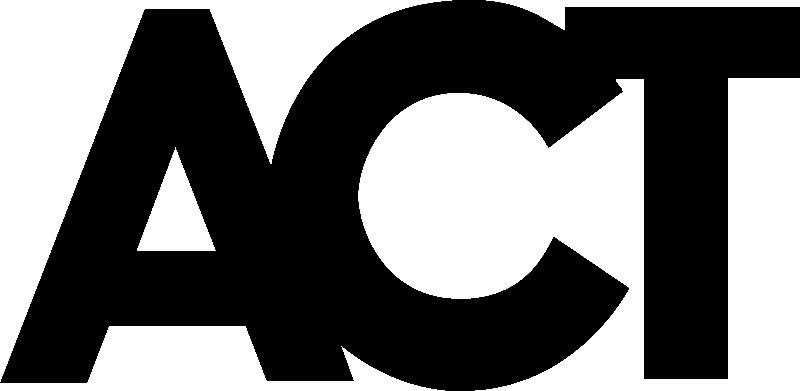
- Parent company: ACT Music + Vision
- Founded: 1992
- Founder: Siegried Loch
- Distributor: Allegro Distribution
- Genre: Jazz, blues
- Country of origin: Germany
- Location: Munich
- Official website: actmusic.com/en

ACT is a German record label founded in 1992 by Siegfried Loch. It is a division of ACT Music + Vision founded by Loch and Annette Humpe in 1988. ACT started as a pop music label but folded soon after it started. Loch turned it into a jazz label, at first reissuing music he had recorded for Liberty, Philips, and WEA before turning to new recordings.

ACT's first release was the album Jazzpaña by Vince Mendoza and Arif Mardin and featured Michael Brecker, Al Di Meola, and Steve Khan. Though it earned two Grammy nominations, the artist that brought ACT Music to international attention was Swedish jazz pianist Esbjörn Svensson, along with his collaborators Magnus Öström and Dan Berglund, who together formed e.s.t. e.s.t. released a string of acclaimed albums on ACT Music and are considered to have been highly influential on modern jazz music, as well as commercially successful. Though their commercial success in Europe was not replicated in the US, their impact was nevertheless such that they became the first European jazz musicians to feature on the cover of DownBeat.

ACT was voted Label of the Year in the German Echo Jazz online poll four times in a row from 2010 to 2013.

== Roster ==
ACT artists include Marius Neset, Bugge Wesseltoft, Lars Danielsson, Viktoria Tolstoy, Vijay Iyer, Leszek Mozdzer, Iiro Rantala, Nils Landgren and Esbjörn Svensson Trio.

Also: Esbjörn Svensson, Rigmor Gustafsson, and Ulf Wakenius. Artists contracted from other countries are the Norwegian saxophonists Geir Lysne, Tore Brunborg, Frøy Aagre, violinist Henning Kraggerud, the band In The Country, the Swedish pianist Jacob Karlzon, the Danish vocalist Cæcilie Norby, the Belgian guitarist Philip Catherine, the Austrian pianist David Helbock, the French drummer Manu Katché. German musicians on the label include Christian Muthspiel, Joachim Kühn, Christof Lauer, Wolfgang Haffner, and Michael Wollny (winner of the ECHO Jazz award in 2010 for best instrumentalist, piano/keyboards).

ACT has recorded Nguyên Lê and Youn Sun Nah (winner of the Echo Jazz award in 2011 for best singer internationally), Jasper van't Hof, Simon Nabatov, and Paolo Fresu.
