= List of ACT Music albums =

A discography of albums released by the label ACT Music. Distributor catalogue numbers are not provided here.

== ACT ==
Catalog number	Artist	Title	Release date in Germany
ACT CD 1918-2	Various Artists -	Die STEREO Hörtest-Edition Vol. II "In the Spirit of Jazz" - Vinyl LP, Hybrid SACD, HiRes FLAC Files	25 October 2013
ACT CD 5005-2	Marlui Miranda	Ihu Todos Os Sons	1 July 1997
ACT CD 5008-2	Banda Matiqueira	Aldeia	1 May 1997
ACT CD 5009-2	Banda Pau Brasil	Babel	1 July 1997
ACT CD 5016-2	Caito Marcondes	Porta Do Templo	1 February 1998
ACT CD 5018-2	Marlui Miranda	2 Ihu Kewere : Rezar	1 October 1997
ACT CD 5019-2	Gilberto Gil	O Sol De Oslo	1 September 1998
ACT CD 6000-2	Various Artists	Lost Blues Tapes - More American Folk Blues Festival 1963-65	1 June 2004
ACT CD 6001-2	Esbjörn Svensson Trio - e.s.t.	Viaticum Platinum Edition	1 October 2005
ACT LP 6002-1	Esbjörn Svensson Trio - e.s.t.	e.s.t. Live In Hamburg	25 October 2013
ACT CD 6002-2	Esbjörn Svensson Trio - e.s.t.	e.s.t. Live In Hamburg	23 November 2007
ACT CD 6003-2	Bugge Wesseltoft	It´s Snowing On My Piano - The Bugge Wesseltoft Platinum Edition	23 October 2009
ACT CD 6004-2	Nguyên Lê	Signature Edition 1	26 March 2010
ACT CD 6005-2	Ulf Wakenius	Signature Edition 2	26 March 2010
ACT CD 6006-2	Lars Danielsson	Signature Edition 3	26 March 2010
ACT CD 6007-2	Wolfgang Haffner	Signature Edition 4	26 March 2010
ACT CD 6011-2	Wolfgang Haffner w/ Tamar Halperin, hr-Bigband	Collector's Edition: Wunderkammer XXL	30 August 2013
ACT CD 6013-2	Nils Landgren	Redhorn Collection	10 October 2014
ACT CD 6014-2	Various Artists	Duo Art: Creating Magic	17 January 2014
ACT CD 6015-2	Various Artists - ACT Family - Special Projects	The ACT Jubilee Concert	27 April 2012
ACT CD 6016-2	Michael Wollny Trio w/ Tim Lefebvre, Eric Schaefer	Weltentraum Concert Edition	15 May 2014
ACT CD 6017-2	Joachim Kühn, 1. Trio: Kühn - Humair - Jenny-Clark, 2. Europeana	Joachim Kühn Birthday Edition	14 March 2014
ACT CD 7000-2	Various Artists	Piano Works 5 CD Box Set	1 October 2005
ACT CD 7001-2	Various Artists	Magic Moments 3 CD Box Set	1 October 2005
ACT CD 9000-2	Sidsel Endresen + Bugge Wesseltoft	Duplex Ride	1 April 1998
ACT CD 9001-2	Various Artists	Live In Montreux: Tribute To Nesuhi / Brazilian Nights	1 April 1998
ACT CD 9002-2	Various Artists	Max-Mix Jazz Me Up!	1 June 1998
ACT CD 9003-2	The Real Group	One For All	1 November 1998
ACT CD 9004-2	Sidsel Endresen + Bugge Wesseltoft	Nightsong	1 January 1999
ACT LP 9005-1	Esbjörn Svensson Trio - e.s.t.	From Gagarin’s Point Of View	28 February 2014
ACT CD 9005-2	Esbjörn Svensson Trio - e.s.t.	From Gagarin’s Point Of View	1 May 1999
ACT CD 9006-2	Kudsi Erguner's Sufi Jazz Project	Ottomania	1 June 1999
ACT CD 9007-2	Esbjörn Svensson Trio - e.s.t.	Winter In Venice	1 September 1999
ACT CD 9008-2	Various Artists	Jazz Me Up! Vol. II	1 October 2000
ACT CD 9009-2	Esbjörn Svensson Trio - e.s.t.	Good Morning Susie Soho	1 September 2000
ACT CD 9010-2	Esbjörn Svensson Trio - e.s.t.	Esbjörn Svensson Trio Plays Monk	1 November 2000
ACT CD 9011-2	Esbjörn Svensson Trio - e.s.t.	Strange Place For Snow	1 March 2002
ACT CD 9012-2	Esbjörn Svensson Trio - e.s.t.	Seven Days Of Falling	1 October 2003
ACT CD 9013-2	Various Artists	Magic Voices	1 October 2003
ACT CD 9014-2	Jonas Knutsson + Johan Norberg	Norrland	1 June 2004
ACT CD 9015-1	Esbjörn Svensson Trio - e.s.t.	Viaticum	27 March 2015
ACT CD 9015-2	Esbjörn Svensson Trio - e.s.t.	Viaticum	1 February 2005
ACT LP 9016-1	Esbjörn Svensson Trio - e.s.t.	Tuesday Wonderland	27 March 2015
ACT CD 9016-2	Esbjörn Svensson Trio - e.s.t.	Tuesday Wonderland	22 September 2006
ACT CD 9017-2	Solveig Slettahjell	Domestic Songs	28 September 2007
ACT LP 9018-1	Esbjörn Svensson Trio - e.s.t.	Leucocyte	14 November 2008
ACT CD 9018-2	Esbjörn Svensson Trio - e.s.t.	Leucocyte	1 September 2008
ACT CD 9019-2	Youn Sun Nah w/ Ulf Wakenius, Lars Danielsson, Xavier Desandre Navarre, Mathias Eick	Voyage	24 April 2009
ACT CD 9020-2	Nils Landgren + Johan Norberg - ACT Jazz Classics	Chapter Two / 2	1 September 2008
ACT LP 9021-1	Esbjörn Svensson Trio - e.s.t.	Retrospective - The Very Best Of e.s.t.	25 September 2009
ACT CD 9021-2	Esbjörn Svensson Trio - e.s.t.	Retrospective - The Very Best Of e.s.t.	25 September 2009
ACT CD 9022-2	Jan Lundgren Trio w/ Mattias Svensson, Rasmus Kihlberg - ACT Jazz Classics	Swedish Standards	24 April 2009
ACT CD 9023-2	Dan Berglund's Tonbruket	Tonbruket	22 January 2010
ACT LP 9024-1	Youn Sun Nah - Vinyl	Same Girl	30 May 2014
ACT CD 9024-2	Youn Sun Nah	Same Girl	24 September 2010
ACT CD 9025-2	Magnus Öström	Thread Of Life	25 February 2011
ACT CD 9027-2	Verneri Pohjola	Aurora	28 January 2011
ACT CD 9029-2	Esbjörn Svensson Trio - e.s.t.	301	30 March 2012
ACT LP 9030-1	Youn Sun Nah w/ Ulf Wakenius, Lars Danielsson, Vincent Peirani, Xavier Desandre-Navarre	Lento	22 March 2013
ACT CD 9030-2	Youn Sun Nah w/ Ulf Wakenius, Lars Danielsson, Vincent Peirani, Xavier Desandre-Navarre	Lento	22 March 2013
ACT LP 9031-1	Marius Neset w/ Trondheim Jazz Orchestra	Lion	30 January 2014
ACT CD 9031-2	Marius Neset w/ Trondheim Jazz Orchestra	Lion	30 January 2014
ACT LP 9032-1	Marius Neset w/ Ivo Neame, Jim Hart, Petter Eldh, Anton Eger	Pinball	30 January 2015
ACT CD 9032-2	Marius Neset w/ Ivo Neame, Jim Hart, Petter Eldh, Anton Eger	Pinball	30 January 2015
ACT CD 9033-2	Mighty Sam McClain & Knut Reiersrud w/ Martin Horntveth, Håkon Kornstad, Bjørn Holm, David Wallumrød, Nikolai Hængsle Eilertsen, Andreas Bye	Tears Of The World	30 January 2015
ACT CD 9042-2	Esbjörn Svensson Trio	E.S.T. Live in London	11 May 2018
ACT CD 9100-2	Joe Pass w/ NDR Bigband	Joe Pass In Hamburg	1 July 1997
ACT CD 9101-2	Pete York & Young Friends, Andi Kissenbeck, Torsten Goods, Gabor Bolla	Basiecally Speaking	27 September 2013
ACT CD 9102-2	Echoes of Swing w/ Colin T. Dawson, Chris Hopkins, Bernd Lhotzky, Oliver Mewes	Blue Pepper	27 September 2013
ACT CD 9200-2	Klaus Doldinger	Bluesy Toosy	1 October 1992
ACT CD 9202-2	Larry Coryell + Philip Catherine	Twin House	1 July 1993
ACT CD 9206-2	Brazillus feat. Eddie Harris	The Regulator	1 July 1993
ACT CD 9207-2	Gil Evans Orchestra	Svengali	1 June 1993
ACT CD 9208-2	Miles Davis, Gil Evans, Camaron, Al di Meola, Paco de Lucia, Chick Corea	Soleá - A Flamenco-jazz Fantasy	1 June 1993
ACT CD 9209-2	Jorge Prado	Cicadas	1 July 1993
ACT CD 9211-2	Attila Zoller Quartet w/ Don Friedman, Barre Phillips, Daniel Humair	The Horizon Beyond	1 July 1993
ACT CD 9212-2	Vince Mendoza, Arif Mardin	Jazzpaña	1 October 1992
ACT CD 9213-2	Balthasar Thomass/Tony Pagano Quartet	Double Mind	1 November 1993
ACT CD 9214-2	Yusef Lateef	The African-American Epic Suite	1 May 1994
ACT CD 9215-2	Vince Mendoza	Sketches	1 June 1994
ACT CD 9218-2	Various Artists	ACT CD Blue Act	1 May 1994
ACT CD 9219-2	Bob Brookmeyer w/ John Abercrombie, Dieter Ilg, Danny Gottlieb, Rainer Brüninghaus, WDR Big Band	Electricity	1 September 1996
ACT CD 9220-2	Joachim Kühn	Europeana	1 February 1995
ACT CD 9221-2	Nguyên Lê Trio w/ Dieter Ilg, Danny Gottlieb	Million Waves	1 March 1995
ACT CD 9222-2	Markus Stockhausen plays the music of Enrique Diaz	Sol Mestizo	1 January 1996
ACT CD 9223-2	Nils Landgren Funk Unit w/ Maceo Parker	Live In Stockholm	1 June 1995
ACT CD 9224-2	Klaus Doldinger	Doldinger’s Best	1 December 1995
ACT CD 9225-2	Nguyên Lê	Tales From Viêt-nam	1 November 1997
ACT CD 9226-2	Nils Landgren w/ Tomasz Stańko	Gotland	1 December 1996
ACT CD 9227-2	Javier Paxariño	Temurá	1 September 1994
ACT CD 9228-2	Jasper Van't Hof w/ Wayne Krantz	Blue Corner	1 July 1993
ACT CD 9229-2	Chris Walden	Ticino	1 March 1996
ACT CD 9230-2	Various Artists	A Little Magic In A Noisy World - The Ultimate ACT World Jazz Anthology Vol. I	1 February 1996
ACT CD 9231-2	The Michael Gibbs Orchestra	Big Music	1 March 1996
ACT CD 9232-2	NDR Bigband	Bravissimo - 50 Years NDR Bigband	1 May 1996
ACT CD 9233-2	NDR Bigband feat. Tomasz Stanko, Heinz Sauer	Ellingtonia	1 February 1999
ACT CD 9234-2	NDR Bigband dir./ Colin Towns	The Theatre Of Kurt Weill	1 June 2000
ACT CD 9235-2	Tim Hagans w/ Norrbotten Big Band feat. Scott Kinsey	Future Miles	1 July 2002
ACT CD 9236-2	Geir Lysne Listening Ensemble w/ Sondre Bratland	Korall	1 January 2003
ACT CD 9240-2	Joaquín Cortés	Pasión Gitana	1 March 1996
ACT CD 9241-2	Jack Walrath + Ralph Reichert	Solidarity	1 September 1996
ACT CD 9242-2	Bernard Purdie	Soul To Jazz	1 September 1996
ACT CD 9243-2	Nils Landgren Funk Unit	Paint It Blue	1 October 1996
ACT CD 9244-2	Ale Möller	Hästen Och Tranan	1 October 1996
ACT CD 9245-2	Nguyên Lê Trio w/ Marc Johnson, Peter Erskine	Three Trios	1 January 1997
ACT CD 9246-2	Jack Walrath + Miles Griffith - The Spirit of Mingus	Get Hit In Your Soul	1 February 2000
ACT CD 9247-2	Ingrid Jensen	Wheelz Around The World 1	1 January 1997
ACT CD 9248-2	Jonas Knutson	Flower In The Sky	1 February 1997
ACT CD 9249-2	Eddie Harris w/ WDR Big Band	The Last Concert	1 February 1997
ACT CD 9250-2	Various Artists	More Magic In A Noisy World - The Ultimate ACT World Jazz Anthology Vol. II	1 January 1997
ACT CD 9251-2	Count Basie Orchestra dir/ Grover Mitchell w/ New York Voices	Count Basie Orchestra	1 April 1997
ACT CD 9252-2	The Real Group	Get Real	1 July 1998
ACT CD 9253-2	Bernard Purdie	Soul To Jazz II	1 July 1998
ACT CD 9254-2	Bengt-Arne Wallin	The Birth And Rebirth Of Swedish Folk Jazz	1 January 1998
ACT CD 9255-2	Cornelius Claudio Kreusch & Black Mud Sound	Scoop	1 February 1998
ACT CD 9256-2	The Real Group	Ori:ginal	1 October 1998
ACT CD 9258-2	The Real Group	Jazz : Live!	1 December 1997
ACT CD 9259-2	NDR Bigband	Bravissimo II	1 March 1998
ACT CD 9260-2	Bugge Wesseltoft	It's Snowing on My Piano	1 November 1997
ACT CD 9261-2	Nguyên Lê	Maghreb & Friends	1 May 1998
ACT CD 9262-2	P.U.L.S.E	Amsterdam Groove	1 April 1998
ACT CD 9263-2	Torbjørn Sunde's Meridians of Music	Meridians	1 July 1998
ACT CD 9264-2	Schäl Sick Brass Band	Tschupun	1 March 1999
ACT CD 9265-2	Nils Landgren Funk Unit	Live In Montreux	1 July 1998
ACT CD 9266-2	Christof Lauer	Fragile Network	1 January 1999
ACT CD 9267-2	Jan Erik Kongshaug	The Other World	1 January 1999
ACT CD 9268-2	Nils Landgren	Ballads	1 April 1999
ACT CD 9269-2	Huong Thanh - music by Nguyên Lê	Moon And Wind	1 June 1999
ACT CD 9270-2	Various Artists	Magic World - The Ultimate ACT World Jazz Anthology Vol. III	1 January 1998
ACT CD 9271-2	Nils Landgren Funk Unit	5000 Miles	1 October 1999
ACT CD 9272-2	Soriba Kouyaté	Kanakassi	1 September 1999
ACT CD 9273-2	Jens Thomas	You Can’t Keep A Good Cowboy Down - Jens Thomas Plays Ennio Morricone	1 January 2000
ACT CD 9274-2	Michael Riessler	Orange	1 January 2000
ACT CD 9275-2	Nguyên Lê Trio w/ Renaud Garcia-Fons, Tino Di Geraldo	Bakida	1 February 2000
ACT CD 9276-2	Richie Beirach	Round About Bartók	1 April 2000
ACT CD 9277-2	Schäl Sick Brass Band	Maza Meze	1 May 2000
ACT CD 9278-2	Wolfgang Haffner - The German Jazz Masters	Old Friends	1 September 2000
ACT CD 9279-2	David Binney w/ Chris Potter, Uri Caine, Adam Rogers, Scott Colley, Brian Blade	South	1 January 2001
ACT CD 9280-2	Various Artists	Magic Moments - The Ultimate ACT World Jazz Anthology Vol. IV	1 January 2000
ACT CD 9281-2	Nils Landgren + Esbjörn Svensson	Layers Of Light	1 January 2001
ACT CD 9282-2	Karim Ziad w/ Nguyên Lê, Bojan Zulfikarpašić a.o.	Ifrikya	1 January 2001
ACT CD 9283-2	Maria Kannegaard Trio w/ Mats Eilertsen, Thomas Strønen	Breaking The Surface	1 July 2000
ACT CD 9284-2	Gerardo Núñez feat. Michael Brecker	Jazzpaña II	1 September 2000
ACT CD 9285-2	Triocolor w/ Björn Lücker, Jens Thomas, Stefan Weeke	Colours Of Ghana	12 January 2001
ACT CD 9286-2	Frank Möbus - Der Rote Bereich	Love Me Tender	1 February 2001
ACT CD 9287-2	Kudsi Erguner w/ Renaud Garcia-Fons, Nguyên Lê a.o.	Islam Blues	1 April 2001
ACT CD 9288-2	Soriba Kouyaté	Bamana	1 April 2001
ACT CD 9289-2	Nguyên Lê Trio w/ Peter Erskine, Michel Benita	E_L_B	1 April 2001
ACT CD 9290-2	Various Artists	Global Magic - The Ultimate ACT World Jazz Anthology Vol. V	1 May 2001
ACT CD 9291-2	Paolo Fresu	Sonos ‘E Memoria	1 May 2001
ACT CD 9292-2	Nils Landgren	The First Unit	1 May 2001
ACT CD 9293-2	Huong Thanh	Dragonfly	1 May 2001
ACT CD 9295-2	Esbjörn Svensson Trio - e.s.t.	Live ‘95	1 November 2001
ACT CD 9296-2	Richie Beirach	Round About Federico Mompou	1 September 2001
ACT CD 9297-2	Christof Lauer + Jens Thomas	Shadows In The Rain	1 September 2001
ACT CD 9298-2	Simon Nabatov	Swing Kings	1 September 2001
ACT CD 9299-2	Nils Landgren Funk Unit	Fonk Da World	1 October 2001
ACT CD 9400-0	Various Artists	Bremen	1 May 1995
ACT CD 9400-2	Various Artists	10 Magic Years - The Best Of ACT World Jazz 1992 - 2002	1 October 2002
ACT CD 9401-2	Simon Nabatov Trio w/ Drew Gress, Tom Rainey	Three Stories, One End	1 February 2002
ACT CD 9402-2	Simon Nabatov + Nils Wogram	Starting A Story	1 July 2002
ACT CD 9403-2	Miki N'Doye w/ Paolo Vinaccia, Bugge Wesseltoft, Solo Cissokho, Jon Balke	Joko	31 January 2002
ACT CD 9404-2	Ramón Valle	Danza Negra - Ramón Valle Plays Ernesto Lecuona	1 May 2002
ACT CD 9405-2	Julia Hülsmann Trio + Rebekka Bakken	Scattering Poems	1 January 2003
ACT CD 9406-2	Geir Lysne Listening Ensemble - "live" at Jazzfest Berlin	Aurora Borealis - Nordic Lights	1 May 2002
ACT CD 9407-2	Frank Möbus - Der Rote Bereich	Risky Business	1 July 2002
ACT CD 9408-2	Terri Lyne Carrington w/ Herbie Hancock, Gary Thomas, Kevin Eubanks a.o.	Jazz Is a Spirit	1 March 2002
ACT CD 9409-2	Nils Landgren	Sentimental Journey	1 September 2002
ACT CD 9410-2	Nguyên Lê w/ Terri Lyne Carrington, Meshell Ndegeocello, a.o.	Purple - Celebrating Jimi Hendrix	1 October 2002
ACT CD 9411-2	David Binney w/ Uri Caine, Wayne Krantz, Tim Lefebvre, Jim Black	Balance	1 September 2002
ACT CD 9412-2	Beirach, Huebner, Mraz	Round About Monteverdi	1 March 2003
ACT CD 9413-2	Gerardo Núñez	The New School Of Flamenco Guitar / La Nueva Escuela De La Guitarra Flamenca	1 March 2003
ACT CD 9414-2	Soriba Kouyaté	Live In Montreux	1 February 2003
ACT CD 9415-2	Jens Thomas + Christof Lauer	Pure Joy	1 April 2003
ACT CD 9416-2	Muriel Zoe	Red And Blue	1 July 2003
ACT CD 9417-2	Michael Riessler + Singer Pur w/ Vincent Courtois	Ahi Vita	1 February 2004
ACT CD 9418-2	Rigmor Gustafsson w/ Nils Landgren + The Flesh Quartet	I Will Wait For You	1 September 2003
ACT CD 9419-2	Joel Harrison	Free Country	1 May 2003
ACT CD 9421-2	Perico Sambeat w/ Brad Mehldau, Kurt Rosenwinkel, Ben Street, Jeff Ballard	Friendship	1 March 2003
ACT CD 9422-2	Gerard Presencer w/ Joe Locke, Geoffrey Keezer	Chasing Reality	1 March 2003
ACT CD 9423-2	Huong Thanh w/ Nguyên Lê, Paul McCandless, Paolo Fresu	Mangustao	1 February 2004
ACT CD 9424-2	Ramón Valle Trio w/ Omar Rodriguez Calvo, Liber Torriente	No Escape	1 November 2003
ACT CD 9425-2	Jonas Knutsson + Johan Norberg	Cow Cow : Norrland II	1 September 2005
ACT CD 9426-2	Gerardo Núñez w/ Paolo Fresu, Perico Sambeat, Mariano Diaz	Andando El Tiempo	1 September 2004
ACT CD 9427-2	Terri Lyne Carrington, Adam Rogers, Jimmy Haslip, Greg Osby	Structure	1 April 2004
ACT CD 9428-2	Nils Landgren + Esbjörn Svensson	Swedish Folk Modern	1 December 1998
ACT CD 9429-2	Eric Watson / Christof Lauer Quartet	Road Movies	1 September 2004
ACT CD 9430-2	Nils Landgren Funk Unit	Funky ABBA	1 April 2004
ACT CD 9431-2	Joel Harrison + David Binney	So Long 2nd Street - Free Country II	1 October 2004
ACT CD 9432-2	Nguyên Lê Quartet w/ Paul McCandless, Art Lande, Jamey Haddad	Walking On The Tiger’s Tail	1 April 2005
ACT CD 9433-2	Heinz Sauer + Michael Wollny	Melancholia	1 April 2005
ACT CD 9434-2	Frank Möbus, Rudi Mahall, John Schröder : Der Rote Bereich	Live In Montreux	1 November 2004
ACT CD 9435-2	Ulf Wakenius w/ Lars Danielsson, Morten Lund	Notes From The Heart (Plays The Music Of Keith Jarrett)	1 November 2005
ACT CD 9436-2	Colin Steele Quintet	Through The Waves	1 May 2005
ACT CD 9437-2	Peter Apfelbaum & The New York Hieroglyphics	It Is Written	1 November 2005
ACT CD 9438-2	ElbtonalPercussion	Four Elements	1 September 2005
ACT CD 9439-2	Olaf Kübler : saxophone jazz	So War’s - Voll Daneben	2 January 2006
ACT CD 9440-2	Various Artists	Magic Moments 2 - The Ultimate ACT World Jazz Anthology Vol. VI	1 April 2004
ACT CD 9441-2	Geir Lysne Listening Ensemble	Boahjenásti - The North Star	27 January 2006
ACT CD 9442-2	Heinz Sauer + Michael Wollny	Certain Beauty	24 February 2006
ACT CD 9443-2	Hugo Siegmeth Celebrating Sidney Brecht	Red Onions	21 April 2006
ACT CD 9444-2	Nguyên Lê Duos w/ Paolo Fresu, Dhafer Youssef	Homescape	24 March 2006
ACT CD 9445-2	Danielsson, Dell, Landgren	Salzau Music On The Water	23 June 2006
ACT CD 9446-2	Christof Lauer w/ Michel Godard, Gary Husband	Blues In Mind	5 January 2007
ACT CD 9447-2	Roberto Di Gioia w/ Dieter Ilg, Wolfgang Haffner Celebrating Klaus Doldinger	Abracadabra	12 May 2006
ACT CD 9448-2	Alboran Trio w/ Paolo Paliaga, Dino Contenti, Gigi Biolcati	Meltemi	12 May 2006
ACT CD 9449-2	Christopher Dell Celebrating Bert Kaempfert feat. Ladi Geisler	The World We Knew	2 February 2007
ACT CD 9450-2	Various Artists	Magic Moments 3 - The Ultimate ACT World Jazz Anthology Vol. VII	1 November 2005
ACT CD 9451-2	Huong Thanh & Nguyên Lê	Fragile Beauty	25 January 2008
ACT CD 9452-2	Eric Watson Trio w/ Peter Herbert, Christophe Marguet	Jaded Angels	27 October 2006
ACT CD 9453-2	Depart w/ Harry Sokal, Heiri Känzig, Jojo Mayer	Reloaded	6 October 2006
ACT CD 9454-2	Nils Landgren w/ Viktoria Tolstoy, Jeanette Köhn, Lars Danielsson, Bugge Wesseltoft, Ulf Wakenius	Christmas With My Friends	17 November 2006
ACT CD 9455-2	Nils Landgren Funk Unit	Licence To Funk	31 August 2007
ACT CD 9456-2	Joachim Kühn + Majid Bekkas w/ Ramon Lopez	Kalimba	27 April 2007
ACT CD 9457-2	Jan Lundgren w/ Lars Danielsson, The Gustaf Sjökvist Chamber Choir	Magnum Mysterium	26 October 2007
ACT CD 9458-2	Lars Danielsson & Leszek Możdżer	Pasodoble	27 April 2007
ACT CD 9459-2	Ulf Wakenius w/ Radio.string.quartet.vienna, Lars Danielsson, Morten Lund, Lars Jansson	Love Is Real	25 April 2008
ACT CD 9460-2	Various Artists	Visions Of Jazz	1 September 2006
ACT CD 9461-2	Heinz Sauer w/ Albert Mangelsdorff, Bob Degen, Michael Wollny	The Journey	4 January 2008
ACT CD 9462-2	Radio.string.quartet.vienna	Celebrating The Mahavishnu Orchestra	9 March 2007
ACT CD 9463-2	Knut Rössler + Johannes Vogt feat. Miroslav Vitous	Between The Times	25 May 2007
ACT CD 9464-2	Niels-Henning Ørsted Pedersen Trio w/ Ulf Wakenius, Jonas Johansen	The Unforgettable NHØP Trio Live	31 August 2007
ACT CD 9465-2	Vince Mendoza w/ Nguyên Lê, Markus Stockhausen, Lars Danielsson, Peter Erskine a.o.	Blauklang	26 September 2008
ACT LP 9466-1	Paolo Fresu / Richard Galliano / Jan Lundgren	Mare Nostrum	30 August 2013
ACT CD 9466-2	Paolo Fresu / Richard Galliano / Jan Lundgren	Mare Nostrum	22 June 2007
ACT CD 9467-2	E_L_B - Peter Erskine_Nguyên Lê_Michel Benita feat. Stéphane Guillaume	Dream Flight	25 April 2008
ACT CD 9468-2	Wolfgang Haffner / Hubert Nuss / Lars Danielsson	Acoustic Shapes	28 March 2008
ACT CD 9469-2	Alboran Trio w/ Paolo Paliaga, Dino Contenti, Gigi Biolcati	Near Gale	28 March 2008
ACT CD 9470-2	Various Artists	ACT CD 1992-2007: 15 Magic Years	23 March 2007
ACT CD 9471-2	Depart w/ Harry Sokal, Heiri Känzig, Jojo Mayer	Mountain Messenger	25 April 2008
ACT CD 9472-2	OddJob w/ Goran Kajfes, Per "Ruskträsk" Johansson, Daniel Karlsson, Peter Forss, Janne Robertson	Sumo	25 April 2008
ACT CD 9473-2	Radio.string.quartet.vienna w/ Klaus Paier	Radiotree	26 September 2008
ACT CD 9474-2	Jonas Knutsson + Johan Norberg introducing Kraja	Skaren : Norrland III	26 September 2008
ACT CD 9475-2	Joachim Kühn w/ Majid Bekkas, Ramon Lopez + Guests	Out Of The Desert	26 June 2009
ACT CD 9476-2	Nils Landgren w/ Jonas Knutsson, Johan Norberg, Jeanette Köhn, Jessica Pilnäs, Sharon Dyall, Eva Kruse, Ida Sand	Christmas With My Friends II	31 October 2008
ACT CD 9477-2	Lars Danielsson w/ Leszek Mozdzer, Mathias Eick, Eric Harland, John Parricelli	Tarantella	27 February 2009
ACT CD 9478-2	Klaus Paier & Asja Valcic	À Deux	9 January 2009
ACT CD 9479-2	Geir Lysne Ensemble	The Grieg Codex	31 January 2009
ACT CD 9480-2	Various Artists	Magic Moments @ Schloss Elmau. Best Of Swedish - German Friendship Concerts	28 August 2009
ACT CD 9481-2	Ida Sand + Ola Gustafsson	True Love	27 March 2009
ACT CD 9482-2	Jan Lundgren Trio w/ Mattias Svensson, Zoltan Csörsz Jr.	European Standards	24 April 2009
ACT CD 9483-2	Nguyên Lê w/ Mieko Miyazaki, Prabhu Edouard, Hariprasad Chaurasia	Saiyuki	23 October 2009
ACT CD 9484-2	Pawel Kaczmarczyk Audiofeeling Band	Complexity In Simplicity	25 September 2009
ACT CD 9485-2	Vladyslav Sendecki	Solo Piano At Schloss Elmau	23 April 2010
ACT CD 9486-2	Thierry Lang w/ Matthieu Michel, Heiri Känzig + Cello Quartet	Lyoba Revisited	8 January 2010
ACT CD 9487-2	Michael Wollny + Tamar Halperin	Michael Wollny's Wunderkammer	25 September 2009
ACT CD 9488-2	Julian & Roman Wasserfuhr w/ Lars Danielsson, Anders Kjellberg + Guests	Upgraded In Gothenburg	28 August 2009
ACT LP 9489-1	Vijay Iyer - Vinyl	Historicity	28 August 2009
ACT CD 9489-2	Vijay Iyer	Historicity	28 August 2009
ACT CD 9490-2	Vince Mendoza w/ The Metropole Orchestra	El Viento - The García Lorca Project	29 May 2009
ACT CD 9491-2	Frøy Aagre w/ Andreas Ulvo, Audun Ellingsen, Freddy Wike	Cycle Of Silence	22 January 2010
ACT CD 9492-2	Helge Sunde - Ensamble Denada	Finding Nymo	23 October 2009
ACT CD 9493-2	Heinz Sauer w/ Michael Wollny, Joachim Kühn	If (Blue) Then (Blue)	8 January 2010
ACT CD 9494-2	OddJob w/ Goran Kajfes, Per "Ruskträsk" Johansson, Daniel Karlsson, Peter Forss, Janne Robertson	Clint	26 February 2010
ACT CD 9495-2	Josefine Cronholm	Songs Of The Falling Feather	26 March 2010
ACT CD 9496-2	Knut Rössler & Johannes Vogt - Between The Times	Octagon	21 May 2010
ACT CD 9497-2	Vijay Iyer	Solo	27 August 2010
ACT CD 9498-2	Céline Bonacina Trio Inviting Nguyên Lê	Way of Life	21 June 2010
ACT CD 9499-2	Yaron Herman	Follow the White Rabbit	22 October 2010
ACT CD 9500-2	Nils Landgren Funk Unit	Funk For Life - In Support Of Médecins Sans Frontières	22 January 2010
ACT CD 9501-2	Gwilym Simcock	Good Days At Schloss Elmau	7 January 2011
ACT CD 9502-2	Joachim Kühn w/ Majid Bekkas, Ramon Lopez	Chalaba	25 February 2011
ACT CD 9503-2	Vijay Iyer w/ Prasanna & Nitin Mitta	Tirtha	25 February 2011
ACT CD 9514-2	Céline Bonacina feat. Himiko Paganotti, Pascal Schumacher, Mino Cinelu	Open Heart	22 February 2013
ACT LP 9535-1	Wolfgang Haffner	Heart Of The Matter	22 February 2013
ACT CD 9538-2	Klaus Paier + Asja Valcic	Silk Road	22 February 2013
ACT CD 9539-2	Arne Jansen - Ode to Goya	The Sleep Of Reason	31 May 2013
ACT LP 9541-1	Magnus Öström w/ Daniel Karlsson, Andreas Hourdakis, Thobias Gabrielson	Searching For Jupiter	30 August 2013
ACT CD 9541-2	Magnus Öström w/ Daniel Karlsson, Andreas Hourdakis, Thobias Gabrielson	Searching For Jupiter	30 August 2013
ACT CD 9542-2	Vincent Peirani w/ Michael Wollny, Michel Benita	Thrill Box	26 April 2013
ACT CD 9545-2	Julian & Roman Wasserfuhr	Running	30 August 2013
ACT CD 9546-2	Lars Danielsson guests Nils Petter Molvær, Jon Christensen, Cæcilie Norby	Libera Me	1 February 2014
ACT CD 9547-2	Jeanette Köhn & Swedish Radio Choir, Nils Landgren, Johan Norberg, Jonas Knutsson, Eva Kruse	New Eyes On Baroque	25 October 2013
ACT LP 9548-1	In The Country w/ Morten Qvenild, Roger Arntzen, Pål Hausken	Sunset Sunrise	22 February 2013
ACT CD 9548-2	In The Country w/ Morten Qvenild, Roger Arntzen, Pål Hausken	Sunset Sunrise	22 February 2013
ACT CD 9550-2	Various Artists	Magic Moments 4: Jazz Is Cool	27 August 2010
ACT CD 9551-2	Christian Muthspiel w/ Matthieu Michel, Franck Tortiller, Steve Swallow - tribute to John Dowland	Seaven Teares	13 March 2013
ACT CD 9552-2	Nils Landgren Funk Unit	Teamwork	30 August 2013
ACT CD 9553-2	Radio.string.quartet.vienna	Posting Joe - Celebrating Weather Report - Live	22 March 2013
ACT CD 9554-2	Pierrick Pédron	Kubic's Cure	25 April 2014
ACT CD 9555-2	Joachim Kühn Trio w/ Majid Bekkas, Ramon Lopez feat. Archie Shepp	Voodoo Sense	30 August 2013
ACT CD 9556-2	Jazz At Berlin Philharmonic w/ Iiro Rantala, Michael Wollny, Leszek Możdżer	Jazz At Berlin Philharmonic I	22 March 2013
ACT CD 9557-2	Możdżer, Danielsson, Fresco	Polska	25 October 2013
ACT LP 9558-1	Tonbruket w/ Dan Berglund, Martin Hederos, Johan Lindström, Andreas Werliin	Nubium Swimtrip	29 November 2013
ACT CD 9558-2	Tonbruket w/ Dan Berglund, Martin Hederos, Johan Lindström, Andreas Werliin	Nubium Swimtrip	27 September 2013
ACT CD 9559-2	Max von Mosch Orchestra	Berlin Kaboom!	27 September 2013
ACT CD 9561-2	Geir Lysne	New Circle	25 October 2013
ACT LP 9562-1	Nils Landgren w/ Michael Wollny, Lars Danielsson, Rasmus Kihlberg, Johan Norberg - Vinyl	Eternal Beauty	31 January 2014
ACT CD 9562-2	Nils Landgren w/ Michael Wollny, Lars Danielsson, Rasmus Kihlberg, Johan Norberg	Eternal Beauty	31 January 2014
ACT LP 9563-1	Michael Wollny Trio w/ Tim Lefebvre, Eric Schaefer - Vinyl	Weltentraum	31 January 2014
ACT CD 9563-2	Michael Wollny Trio w/ Tim Lefebvre, Eric Schaefer	Weltentraum	31 January 2014
ACT CD 9564-2	Gwilym Simcock w/ City of London Sinfonia, Yuri Goloubev, Martin France	Instrumation	25 July 2014
ACT CD 9565-2	Ulf Wakenius	Momento Magico	28 March 2014
ACT CD 9566-2	Iiro Rantala Trio w/ Adam Bałdych, Asja Valcic	Anyone With A Heart	28 February 2014
ACT CD 9567-2	Christof Lauer & NDR Bigband play Sidney Bechet	Petite Fleur	31 October 2014
ACT CD 9568-2	Nils Landgren w/ Jonas Knutsson, Johan Norberg, Jeanette Köhn, Jessica Pilnäs, Sharon Dyall, Eva Kruse, Ida Sand	Christmas With My Friends IV	31 October 2014
ACT CD 9569-2	Jazz At Berlin Philharmonic w/ In The Country, Solveig Slettahjell, Bugge Wesseltoft, Knut Reiersrud	Jazz at Berlin Philharmonic II: Norwegian Woods	6 June 2014
ACT LP 9571-1	Lars Danielsson w/ Tigran, John Parricelli, Magnus Öström	Liberetto II - CD	29 August 2014
ACT CD 9571-2	Lars Danielsson w/ Tigran, John Parricelli, Magnus Öström	Liberetto II - CD	29 August 2014
ACT CD 9572-2	Jerry Léonide	The Key	29 August 2014
ACT LP 9573-1	Jacob Karlzon 3 w/ Hans Andersson, Robert Mehmet Ikiz	Shine	29 August 2014
ACT CD 9573-2	Jacob Karlzon 3 w/ Hans Andersson, Robert Mehmet Ikiz	Shine	29 August 2014
ACT CD 9574-2	Nguyên Lê w/ Michael Gibbs & NDR Bigband	Nguyên Lê celebrating The Dark Side Of The Moon	31 October 2014
ACT CD 9575-2	Emile Parisien Quartet w/ Julien Touéry, Ivan Gélugne, Sylvain Darrifourcq	Spezial Snack	26 September 2014
ACT lp 9576-1	Wolfgang Haffner w/ Jan Lundgren, Dusko Goykovich a.o.	Kind of Cool	27 February 2015
ACT CD 9576-2	Wolfgang Haffner w/ Jan Lundgren, Dusko Goykovich a.o.	Kind of Cool	27 February 2015
ACT LP 9577-1	Manu Katché w/ Luca Aquino, Tore Brunborg, Jim Watson	Live in concert	15 August 2014
ACT CD 9577-2	Manu Katché w/ Luca Aquino, Tore Brunborg, Jim Watson	Live in concert	15 August 2014
ACT CD 9578-2	Leszek Możdżer w/ Lars Danielsson, Zohar Fresco, Atom String Quartet	Jazz at Berlin Philharmonic III	27 March 2015
ACT LP 9581-1	Rudresh Mahanthappa w/ Adam O'Farrill, Matt Mitchell, François Moutin, Rudy Royston	Bird Calls	27 February 2015
ACT CD 9581-2	Rudresh Mahanthappa w/ Adam O'Farrill, Matt Mitchell, François Moutin, Rudy Royston	Bird Calls	27 February 2015
ACT CD 9582-2	Dieter Ilg w/ Rainer Böhm, Patrice Héral	Mein Beethoven	30 January 2015
ACT CD 9583-2	Romain Collin	Press Enter	24 April 2015
ACT CD 9584-2	Vincent Peirani	Living Being	30 January 2015
ACT CD 9585-2	Gerardo Núñez w/ Ulf Wakenius a.o.	Jazzpaña Live	29 May 2015
ACT CD 9586-2	Tore Brunborg w/ Eivind Aarset, Per Oddvar Johansen, Steinar Raknes	Snow Slow	24 April 2015
ACT CD 9588-2	Terri Lyne Carrington w/ Herbie Hancock, Nguyên Lê a.o.	The ACT Years	29 May 2015
ACT CD 9590-2	Various Artists	Magic Moments 6 "In The Spirit Of Jazz"	22 March 2013
ACT LP 9591-1	Adam Baldych w/ Helge Lien Trio	Bridges	28 August 2015
ACT CD 9591-2	Adam Baldych w/ Helge Lien Trio	Bridges	28 August 2015
ACT CD 9593-2	Solveig Slettahjell w/ Knut Reiersrud & In The Country	Trail Of Souls	20 November 2015
ACT CD 9595-2	Various Artists	Magic Moments 7 "Sounds of Surprise"	10 October 2014
ACT CD 9600-2	Various Artists	What’s Nu? Music Beyond	1 November 2003
ACT CD 9601-2	ElbtonalPercussion feat. Christopher Dell	Drumtronic	1 November 2003
ACT CD 9602-2	Roberto Di Gioia's Marsmobil	Strange World	1 November 2003
ACT LP 9603-1	Wolfgang Haffner (Vinyl)	Shapes Remixes	26 May 2006
ACT CD 9603-2	Wolfgang Haffner	Shapes	26 May 2006
ACT CD 9604-2	Lars Danielsson w/ Bugge Wesseltoft, Nils Petter Molvær	Mélange Bleu	1 September 2006
ACT CD 9605-2	Wolfgang Haffner feat. Dominic Miller, Chuck Loeb, Lars Danielsson a.o.	Round Silence	25 September 2009
ACT CD 9606-2	McJazz - Annette Humpe, Anselm Kluge, Peter Weniger, Ingolf Burkhardt	Bass Me	25 September 2009
ACT CD 9621-2	Philip Catherine & Martin Wind - Duo Art	New Folks	17 January 2014
ACT CD 9622-2	George Mraz & Emil Viklický - Duo Art	Together Again	28 February 2014
ACT CD 9623-2	Joachim Kühn & Alexey Kruglov - Duo Art	Moscow	28 February 2014
ACT CD 9624-2	Gwilym Simcock & Yuri Goloubev - Duo Art	Reverie at Schloss Elmau	17 January 2014
ACT CD 9626-2	Adam Baldych & Yaron Herman - Duo Art	The New Tradition	30 May 2014
ACT CD 9627-2	Rita Marcotulli & Luciano Biondini - Duo Art	La Strada Invisibile	26 September 2014
ACT CD 9629-2	Perko & Rantala - Duo Art	It Takes Two To Tango	24 April 2015
ACT CD 9650-2	Wollny / Kruse / Schaefer : young german jazz	Call It [em]	1 January 2005
ACT CD 9651-2	Jazzindeed w/ Michael Schiefel : young german jazz	Blaue Augen	1 April 2005
ACT CD 9652-2	Young Friends w/ Trübsbach / Lauer / Schaefer / Kruse / Schlosser / Wollny : young german jazz	Great German Songbook	1 September 2005
ACT CD 9653-2	Daerr / Sieverts / Juette Celebrating Ralph Siegel : young german jazz	Germany 12 Points	2 January 2006
ACT CD 9654-2	Julian & Roman Wasserfuhr Quartet feat. Torsten Goods : young german jazz	Remember Chet	21 April 2006
ACT CD 9655-2	Wollny / Kruse / Schaefer : young german jazz	[em] II	1 September 2006
ACT CD 9656-2	Carsten Daerr + Daniel Erdmann : young german jazz	Berlin Calling	2 February 2007
ACT CD 9657-2	Matthias Schriefl : young german jazz	Shreefpunk Plus Strings	23 February 2007
ACT CD 9659-2	Chris Gall : young german jazz	Climbing Up	22 February 2008
ACT CD 9660-2	Michael Wollny : young german jazz	[em] 3	22 February 2008
ACT CD 9661-2	Jan Zehrfelds Panzerballett : young german jazz	Starke Stücke	22 February 2008
ACT CD 9662-2	Jörg Brinkmann Trio w/ Oliver Maas, Dirk-Peter Kölsch : young german jazz	Ha!	29 August 2008
ACT CD 9663-2	Matthias Schriefl : young german jazz	Shreefpunk Live In Köln - Special Guest: Django Bates	27 March 2009
ACT CD 9664-2	Jan Zehrfelds Panzerballett : young german jazz	Hart Genossen Von ABBA Bis Zappa	28 August 2009
ACT CD 9666-2	max.bab : young german jazz	Inner Orbit	28 August 2009
ACT CD 9667-2	Chris Gall Trio feat. Enik : young german jazz	Hello Stranger	23 April 2010
ACT CD 9668-2	Wollny / Kruse / Schaefer : young german jazz	[em] Live	24 September 2010
ACT CD 9671-2	Mo' Blow w/ Felix F. Falk, Matti Klein, Tobias Fleischer, André Seidel : young german jazz	Gimme The Boots	26 April 2013
ACT CD 9672-2	Three Fall w/ Lutz Streun, Til Schneider, Sebastian Winne : young german jazz	Realize!	28 June 2013
ACT CD 9673-2	Tobias Christl : young german jazz	Wildern	26 September 2014
ACT CD 9674-2	Jan Prax Quartet : young german jazz	Keepin' A Style Alive	27 March 2015
ACT CD 9701-2	Viktoria Tolstoy : vocal jazz	Shining On You - Viktoria Tolstoy Sings The Music Of Esbjörn Svensson	1 February 2004
ACT CD 9702-2	Julia Hülsmann Trio feat. Anna Lauvergnac : vocal jazz	Come Closer - Celebrating Randy Newman	1 April 2004
ACT CD 9703-2	Rigmor Gustafsson + The Jacky Terrasson Trio : vocal jazz	Close To You - Celebrating Dionne Warwick	1 November 2004
ACT CD 9704-2	Muriel Zoe : vocal jazz	Neon Blue	1 January 2005
ACT CD 9705-2	Viktoria Tolstoy : vocal jazz	My Swedish Heart	1 March 2005
ACT CD 9706-2	Various Artists : vocal jazz	Magic Voices II	1 April 2005
ACT CD 9707-2	Nils Landgren & Joe Sample	Creole Love Call	1 November 2005
ACT CD 9708-2	Solveig Slettahjell Slow Motion Quintet - vocal jazz	Pixiedust	27 January 2006
ACT CD 9709-2	Julia Hülsmann Trio + Roger Cicero - vocal jazz	Good Morning Midnight	27 January 2006
ACT CD 9710-2	Rigmor Gustafsson Sings the music of Michel Legrand - vocal jazz	On My Way To You	27 January 2006
ACT CD 9711-2	Michael Schiefel - vocal jazz	Don't Touch My Animals	1 September 2006
ACT CD 9712-2	Viktoria Tolstoy - vocal jazz	Pictures Of Me	22 September 2006
ACT CD 9713-2	Solveig Slettahjell Slow Motion Quintet - vocal jazz	Good Rain	20 October 2006
ACT CD 9714-2	Torsten Goods - vocal jazz	Irish Heart	27 October 2006
ACT CD 9715-2	Solveig Slettahjell Slow Motion Quintet - vocal jazz	Silver	20 October 2006
ACT CD 9716-2	Ida Sand - vocal jazz	Meet Me Around Midnight	23 March 2007
ACT CD 9717-2	Rigmor Gustafsson - vocal jazz	Alone With You	28 September 2007
ACT CD 9718-2	Various Artists - vocal jazz	Magic Nordic Voices	28 September 2007
ACT CD 9719-2	Torsten Goods - vocal jazz	1980	29 August 2008
ACT CD 9720-2	Carla Marcotulli w/ Dick Halligan - vocal jazz	How Can I Get To Mars?	30 May 2008
ACT CD 9721-2	Viktoria Tolstoy - vocal jazz	My Russian Soul	26 September 2008
ACT CD 9722-2	Rigmor Gustafsson w/ Radio.string.quartet.vienna - vocal jazz	Calling You	26 February 2010
ACT CD 9723-2	Cæcilie Norby w/ Lars Danielsson, Bugge Wesseltoft, Ulf Wakenius, Palle Mikkelborg a.o.	Arabesque	28 January 2011
ACT CD 9725-2	Cæcilie Norby w/ Lars Danielsson, Robert Mehmet Ikiz, Nguyên Lê : vocal jazz	Silent Ways	31 May 2013
ACT CD 9726-2	Torsten Goods w/ Jan Miserre, Christian von Kaphengst, Wolfgang Haffner : vocal jazz	Love Comes To Town	28 June 2013
ACT CD 9727-2	Rigmor Gustafsson & Jakob Karlzon : vocal jazz	A Moment Of Now	25 October 2013
ACT CD 9728-2	Rigmor Gustafsson : vocal jazz	When You Make Me Smile	29 August 2014
ACT CD 9729-2	Ida Sand : vocal jazz	Young At Heart	27 March 2015
ACT CD 9730-2	Natalia Mateo : vocal jazz	Heart of Darkness	27 March 2015
ACT CD 9749-2	Various Artists	Piano Works: Romantic Freedom	1 October 2005
ACT CD 9750-2	Joachim Kühn	Piano Works I: Allegro Vivace	1 October 2005
ACT CD 9751-2	George Gruntz	Piano Works II: Ringing The Luminator	1 October 2005
ACT CD 9752-2	Kevin Hays	Piano Works III: Open Range	1 October 2005
ACT CD 9753-2	Ramón Valle	Piano Works IV: Memorias	1 October 2005
ACT CD 9754-2	Simon Nabatov	Piano Works V: Around Brazil	26 May 2006
ACT CD 9755-2	Don Friedman	Piano Works VI: From A To Z	26 May 2006
ACT CD 9756-2	Michael Wollny	Piano Works VII: Hexentanz	23 February 2007
ACT CD 9757-2	Chris Beier	Piano Works VIII: Aeolian	28 March 2008
ACT CD 9758-2	Joachim Kühn & Michael Wollny	Piano Works IX: Live At Schloss Elmau	27 February 2009
ACT CD 9759-2	Danilo Rea	Piano Works X: Danilo Rea At Schloss Elmau "A Tribute To Fabrizio De André"	27 August 2010
ACTSACD 9800-2	Lars Danielsson feat. Nils Petter Molvær, Jon Christensen, Cæcilie Norby	Libera Me	1 October 2004
ACT SACD 9801-2	Esbjörn Svensson Trio - e.s.t.	Viaticum	1 May 2005
ACT SACD 9802-2	Nils Landgren	Sentimental Journey	1 November 2005
ACT SACD 9804-2	Joachim Kühn	Europeana - Jazzphony No. 1 by Michael Gibbs	1 September 2006
ACT SACD 9805-2	Joachim Kühn	Europeana - Jazzphony No. 1 by Michael Gibbs	1 September 2006
ACT SACD 9806-2	Esbjörn Svensson Trio - e.s.t.	Tuesday Wonderland	23 March 2007
ACT DVD 9900-9	Helge Sunde Norske Store Orkester w/ Olga Konkova, Marilyn Mazur	Denada	22 September 2006
ACT DVD 9901-9	Nils Landgren w/ Viktoria Tolstoy, Jeanette Köhn, Sharon Dyall, Ida Sandlund, Ulf Wakenius, Johan Norberg, Lars Danielsson, Bugge Wesseltoft	Christmas Concert With My Friends	17 November 2006
ACT DVD 9902-9	Radio.string.quartet.vienna	Celebrating The Mahavishnu Orchestra - Live At Traumzeit Festival	27 March 2009

== EMOCIÓN ==
Catalog number	Artist	Title	Release date
EMO 4000-2	Steve Klink	Blue Suit	1 May 1999
EMO 4001-2	Jessica Pilnäs w/ Johan Norberg, Nils Landgren, Dan Berglund, Wolfgang Haffner a.o.	Bitter And Sweet	28 January 2011
EMO 4002-2	Randi Tytingvåg w/ Erlend Aasland, Dag S. Vagle	Three	27 February 2015
EMO 9300-2	Various Artists	The Art Of Flamenco	1 July 1993
EMO 9301-2	Festival Flamenco Gitano	The Original Festival Flamenco Gitano 1965	1 October 1993
EMO 9302-2	Tomatito	Barrio Negro	1 October 1993
EMO 9303-2	Jorge Prado	Veloz Hacia	1 September 1993
EMO 9304-2	Various Artists	The Best Jovenes Flamencos	1 December 1994
EMO 9305-2	José Parrondo, Miguel Iven	Recital De Cante Flamenco	1 April 1996
EMO 9306-2	Rafael Riqueni	Maestros	1 September 1995
EMO 9306-2	Various Artists	¡feria! The Best Sevillanas	1 June 1996
EMO 9308-2	Tomatito	Guitarra Gitana	1 August 1996
