= Alboran =

Alboran or Alborán may refer to

- Alboran Sea, the westernmost portion of the Mediterranean Sea
  - Alboran Island, an islet of Spain
  - the Battle of Alborán, which took place in 1540 off the island
- Alboran Trio, an Italian jazz piano trio
- Nicolas Moreno de Alboran (born 1997), an American tennis player
- Pablo Alborán (born 1989), a Spanish musician and singer-songwriter

== See also ==
- Alborn (disambiguation)
