= Soriba =

Soriba is a given name. Notable people with the given name include:

- Soriba Diaoune (born 2007), French footballer
- Soriba Kouyaté (1963-2010), Senegalese kora musician
- Soriba Soumah (1946-2004), Guinean footballer
