= Johan Lindström =

Johan Lindström may refer to:

- Johan Lindström (ice hockey)
- Johan Lindström (musician)
