= Céline Bonacina =

French saxophonist and composer

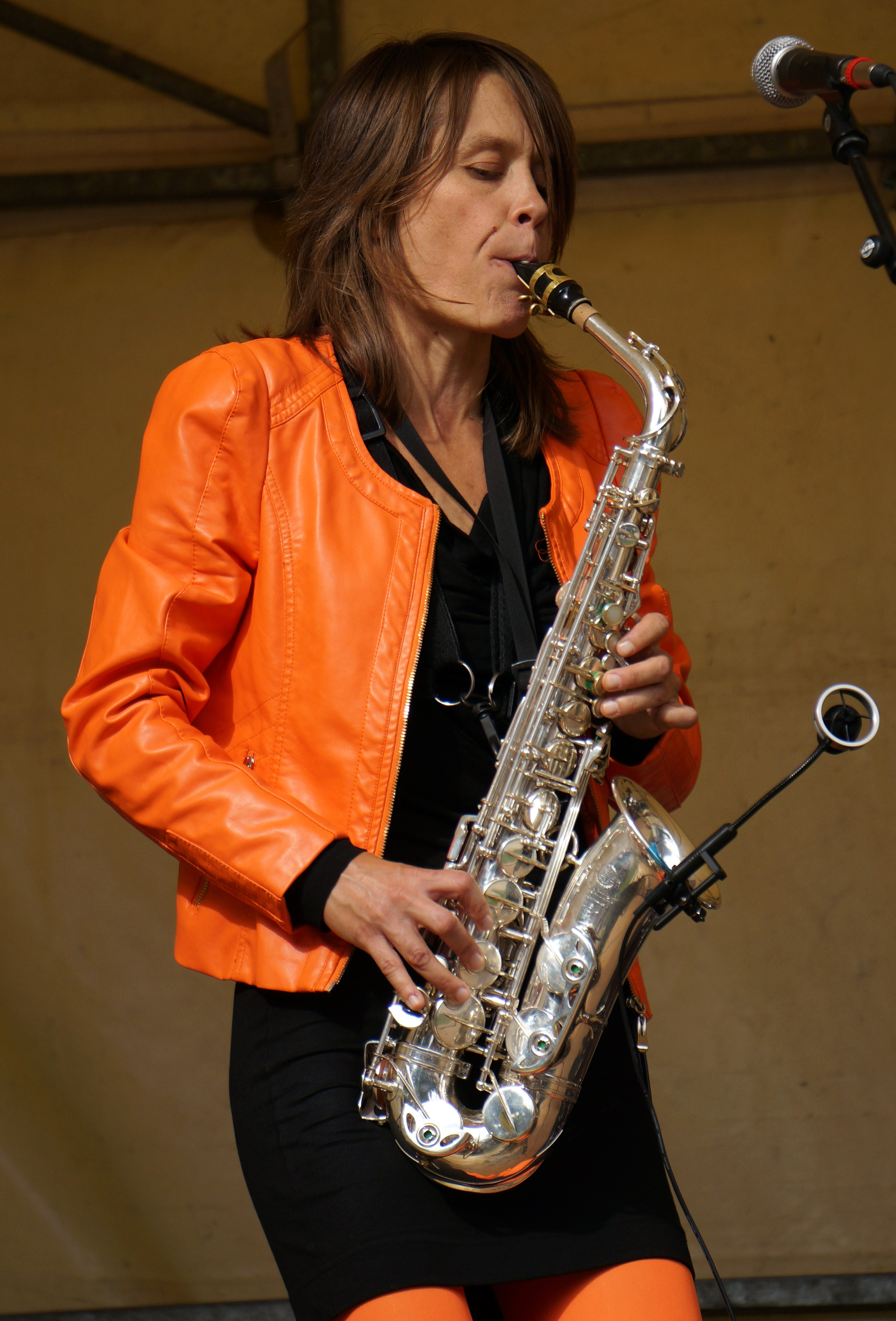
- Céline Bonacina, 2013

Background information
- Born: July 23, 1975 (age 49); Belfort, France)
- Occupation(s): Saxophonist, composer
- Website: celine-bonacina.com

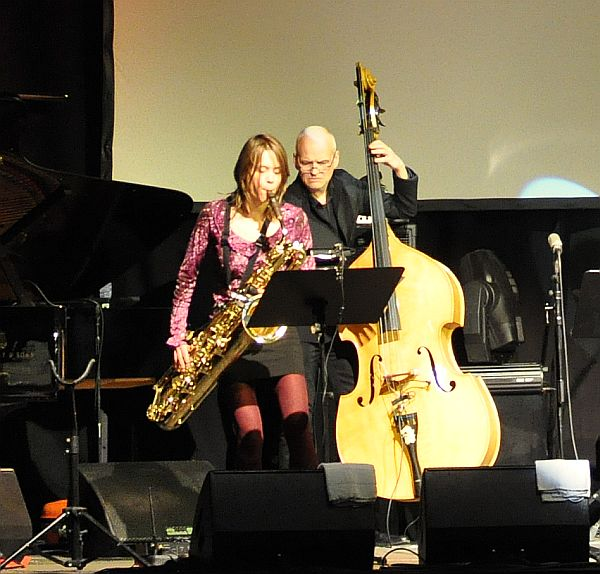
Céline Bonacina with Lars Daniellson, 2012.

Céline Bonacina (born 23 July 1975 in Belfort, France) is a French saxophonist and composer. She plays soprano, alto and baritone saxophone.

== Biography ==
Bonacina started learning music at the age of eight. She got classical saxophone lessons at various conservatories in Belfort, Besançon and Paris.

Between 1996 and 1998, Bonacina played baritone saxophone in various jazz big bands in Paris. She then moved to Réunion, for seven years to teach saxophone at the Conservatoire National de Région During this time, she participated at numerous festivals in the Indien Oceans region. She was musically influenced of the inclusion of the living rhythms there, and this is reflected in her later compositions. Returning to Paris, her debut album Vue d'en Haut was released in 2005.

Bonacina has collaborated with musicians such as the French pianist Laurent de Wilde, Cuban pianist Omar Sosa, vibraphonist Mike Mainieri, saxophonist Andy Sheppard and guitarists Yannick Robert and Nguyên Lê. In addition, and she temporarily supplemented the Funk Unit of the Swedish trombonist Nils Landgren.

Her album Way of Life, which is based almost exclusively on her own compositions, was recorded with a trio comprising the French Nicolas Garnier (bass guitar) and the Malagasy Hary Ratsimbazafy (drums and percussion) and the guitarist Nguyên Lê as a guest musician. In November 2010 she took part with her trio at the JazzFest Berlin.

The music of this trio has been largely played all over Europe with special guest Romain Labaye on bass.

In 2013, after the release of Open Heart, she created a sextet to play the music of this album, involving Leila Martial on vocals, Illya Amar on vibes & electronics, Romain Labaye on bass and vocals, Nicolas Leroy on percussion and Hary Ratsimbazafy on drums. The sextet performed in the two major jazz festivals in France: Jazz à Vienne and Jazz in Marciac, but also Paris Jazz Festival, London Jazz Festival as well as many venues in France and Europe.

Bonacina has won a number of saxophonist prizes in classical and jazz, such as the Defense Concours national jazz festival and the Festival Jazz - La Ciotat.

== Discography (in selection) ==
- 2005: Vue d’en Haut (Self Release)
- 2010: Way of Life (ACT), with Céline Bonacina Trio, feat Nguyên Lê
- 2012: The ACT Jubilee Concert (ACT), with Nils Landgren, Michael Wollny, Leszek Możdżer, Nguyên Lê, Lars Danielsson, Wolfgang Haffner, Cæcilie Norby, and Verneri Pohjola
- 2013: Open Heart (ACT), with Céline Bonacina Trio & guests
- 2016: Crystal Rain (Cristal Records), with Céline Bonacina Crystal Quartet
- 2023: Jump! (Cristal Records), with Rachel Eckroth, Chris Jennings and John Hadfield
