= Radio.string.quartet.vienna =

Austrian string quartet

radio.string.quartet
- Genres: radio.string.quartet, post-classical, ambient, electronica, experimental
- Years active: 2004-present
- Members: Bernie Mallinger - violin, voc Igmar Jenner - violin Cynthia Liao - viola, voc Sophie Abraham - cello, voc
- Website: www.radiostringquartet.net

The radio.string.quartet, interim radio.string.quartet.vienna, is a contemporary string quartet based in Vienna.

They are known for using a big variety of musical styles including classical, folk, rock, jazz, pop music, electronica and contemporary music in their compositions and arrangements. Despite their name they have no artistic connection to any radio station.

== History ==
The quartet was one of the big discoveries of the Berlin Jazz Festival in 2006 with its adaptation of the music of the Mahavishnu Orchestra.

John McLaughlin wrote the liner notes to their first album: ...."From the first note I was struck by the way this group had 'appropriated' my music and made it their very own. They even got the atmosphere which was present all those years ago. The other aspect that touched me deeply was the importance they attach to improvisation, and they do improvise!.... ...This is no ordinary string quartet. The love of, and the dedication they have to their respective instruments is marvellous, and the fact that they have taken what was electric jazz-fusion music, fused it with their training in 'classical' music, and conserved the 'electric' atmosphere is outstanding."

Radiodream (2011) marked a new chapter in the band's history: it is the most independent work of the quartet containing a huge percentage of their own compositions, which show the various musical and cultural backgrounds of the band members.

Posting Joe - Celebrating Weather Report - live (2013) is paying homage to their fellow countryman, the great composer and pianist/keyboard player Joe Zawinul. It was voted "#2 jazz album of the year 2013" by The Sunday Times.

In 2014 the band began to work on in between silence (2017), which defined a new operation mode both in their studio work and in their live-performance. The use of voices and electronics widens the band's horizons considerably, a stylistic device which is now used for the first time on several pieces. The album compositions - exclusively written by the quartet - basically were re-arranged for the live-performance. With that step the band tried to adapt the spatial variability of listening to music live or from an album. For in between silence album the band worked with a co-producer for the first time, the Norwegian pianist and NuJazz-pioneer Bugge Wesseltoft.

In 2020 the band begins with their "quadrology", whose basic idea is to represent the 4 elements earth, fire, air and water in their musical language and to relate them to each other. For each individual element there will be collaborations and a different line-up, the center and musical link of which will be radio.string.quartet.

The first element to appear, for the first time on her own label SeeYulette, was Erd' with the Austrian singer and composer Roland Neuwirth in June 2020. In 2022 they released B:A:C:H • like waters, an audiovisual journey based on Johann Sebastian Bach's g-minor Violin Solosonata.

== Discography ==
- Celebrating the Mahavishnu Orchestra (2007; ACT)
- Radiotree, with Klaus Paier (2008; ACT)
- appearance on Ulf Wakenius's Love is real (2008; ACT)
- Celebrating the Mahavishnu Orchestra live at Traumzeit Festival DVD (2009; ACT)
- with Rigmor Gustafsson: Calling you (2010; ACT)
- Radiodream (2011; ACT)
- Posting Joe - Celebrating Weather Report - live (2013; ACT)
- The Jazz Composer's Orchestra Update, with Michael Mantler (2014; ECM)
- in between silence (2017; Jazzland)
- Erd' with Roland Neuwirth (2020; SeeYulette)
- B:A:C:H • like waters (2022; SeeYulette)

== Awards ==
- Preis der deutschen Schallplattenkritik for Celebrating the Mahavishnu Orchestra
- Pasticcio-Preis for Celebrating the Mahavishnu Orchestra

== Literature ==
- radio.string.quartet: Celebrating the Mahavishnu Orchestra.ergeo, 2007
