= Luca Aquino =

Italian jazz trumpeter and flugelhornist (born 1974)

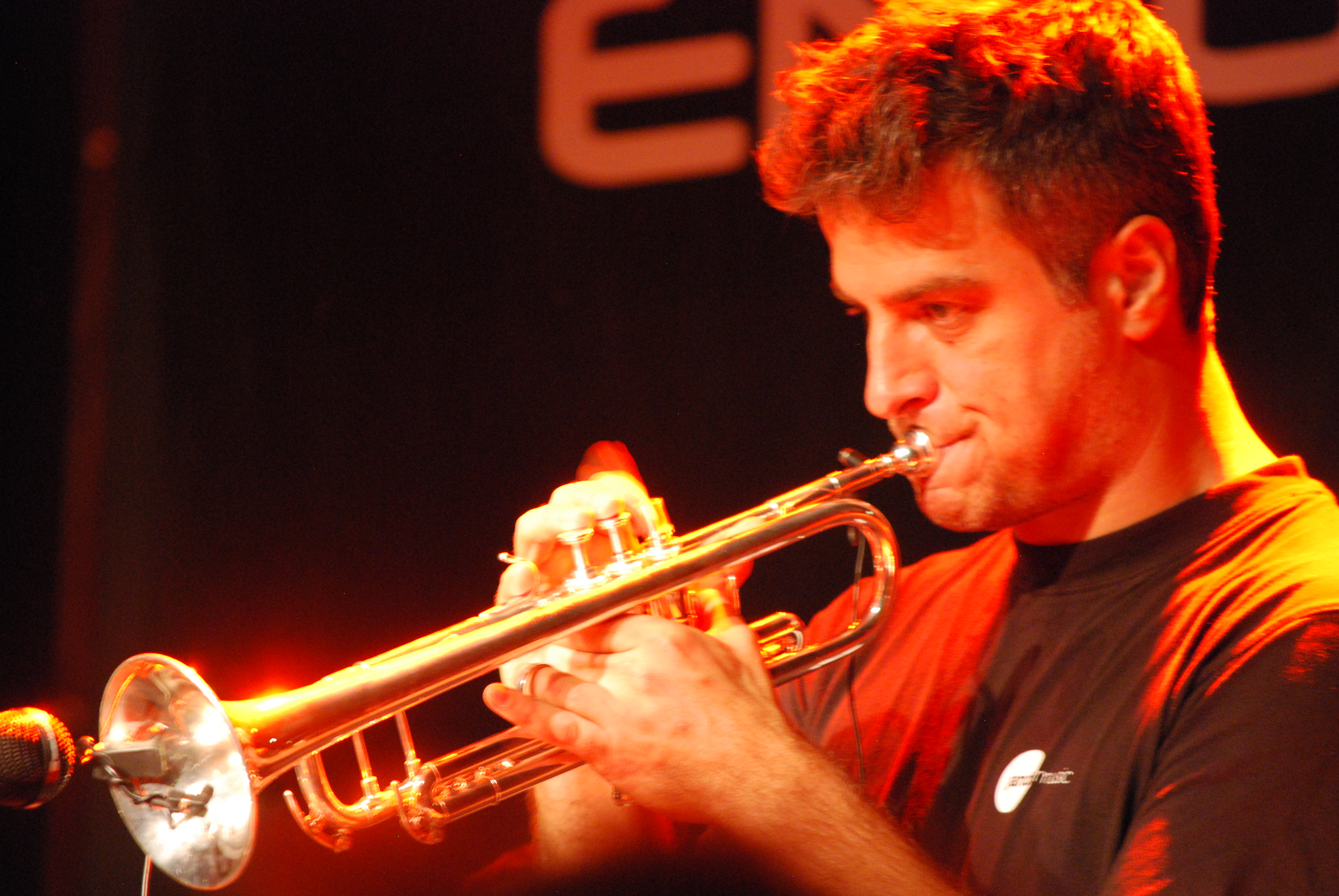
- R.P. Braun, Luca Aquino

Background information
- Born: June 1, 1974 (age 50); Benevento, Italy
- Genres: World music, jazz
- Instrument(s): Trumpet, flugelhorn
- Labels: ACT
- Website: www.lucaaquino.com

Luca Aquino (born June 1, 1974) is an Italian jazz trumpeter and flugelhornist.

== Life and career ==
Born in the town of Benevento, in southern Italy, he was mainly self-taught when he began to play the trumpet at the age of nineteen. For two years he abandoned the practice of the instrument to pursue a master's degree in economics. His love for the sound of Miles Davis and Chet Baker brought him back to the study of trumpet.

In 2007 Universal Music released Sopra Le Nuvole, his first album as leader. A year later he recorded Lunaria with guests Roy Hargrove and Maria Pia De Vito. The album won the Top Jazz award by the Italian magazine Musica Jazz. In 2009, he recorded Amam, then TSC in a church in the Netherlands. In 2010, he recorded Icaro Solo for solo trumpet and electronics in a church in Benevento. After creating the festival Riverberi, a collaboration with Mimmo Paladino led to Chiaro an album in trio with a Norwegian rhythm section and special guest Lucio Dalla. In 2012, after a live album with American trumpeter Jon Hassell for the Church of Saint Augustine in Benevento, he joined the quartet of the percussionist Manu Katché and recorded two albums. In 2013 with the accordionist Carmine Ioanna he recorded aQustico for Tuk Music and embarked on a world tour. In 2015 OverDOORS was a tribute to his favorite rock band, The Doors.

In December 2015 he worked with the Jordanian National Association Orchestra on an album in the archaeological site of Petra. The album was made possible by the support of UNESCO Amman Office, the Petra Development and Tourism Authority, and the Talal Abu-Ghazaleh Organization (TAG-Org). He participated in an initiative promoted within the framework of the global campaign #UNITE4HERITAGE, started by UNESCO in defense of the artistic and cultural heritage.

After directing the Pozzuoli Jazz Festival and the Bari Jazz on April 7, 2016 he participated in Manu & Friends, sharing the stage of the Olympia in Paris with Sting, Richard Bona, Noa, Stephan Eicher, Raul Midon, and Tore Brunborg.

In 2017 a signature trumpet model "Aquino" was handcrafted by the Dutch artisan Hub Van Laar. In 2017 Aquino developed Bell's palsy, an injury to the seventh nerve in his face, forcing him to cancel the Jazz Bike Tour which included fifty concerts to be traveled by bike from Benevento to Oslo.

== Style ==
He was influenced by the early playing of Chet Baker and Miles Davis, for which he was given the nickname "Apostle of Miles", and by the rock bands The Doors and AC/DC. He is known for research on natural sound, the use of electronics, and his passion for musical experimentation in unusual places.

== Discography ==
=== As leader ===
- Sopra Le Nuvole (Emarcy, 2008)
- Lunaria (Universal Classics & Jazz, 2009)
- Icaro Solo (Emarcy, 2010)
- Chiaro (Tuk, 2011)
- Did You Hear Something? (Leo, 2013)
- aQustico (Tuk/Bonsai, 2013)
- Live in Concert (ACT, 2014)
- Rock 4.0 (Musica Jazz, 2014)
- OverDOORS (Tuk, 2015)
- Petra (TAGI, 2016)
- Aqustico Vol. 2 (Losen, 2017)
- Italian Songbook (ACT, 2019)
