= Soriba Kouyaté =

- Born: 23 December 1963; Dakar, Senegal
- Died: 13 October 2010 (aged 46) Jouarre France
- Genres: Mandingo, jazz
- Occupation: Musician
- Instrument: Kora
- Formerly of: Kora Jazz Trio

Soriba Kouyaté (1963–2010) was a Senegalese kora player. He was born in Dakar, the son of kora player Mamadou Kouyaté.

He played with musicians like Youssou N'Dour, Salif Keita, Peter Gabriel, Dizzy Gillespie, Harry Belafonte, Diana Ross, Ray Lema and the Kora Jazz Trio.

Kouyaté died 46 years old after a heart attack.

== Discography ==
- Djigui (1995)
- Kanakassi (1999)
- Bamana (2001)
- Spirits Of Rhythm (2002), guest
- Live in Montreux (2003), ACT
