= Alborn =

Alborn may refer to:

- Alborn Township, St. Louis County, Minnesota, a township in Saint Louis County, Minnesota, United States
- Alborn, Minnesota, an unincorporated community in Alborn Township, Saint Louis County, Minnesota, United States

== People with the surname ==
- Alan Alborn (born 1980), American ski jumper
- Ray Alborn (1938–2026), American football player and coach
