= Ida Sand =

Swedish jazz singer and pianist (born 1977)

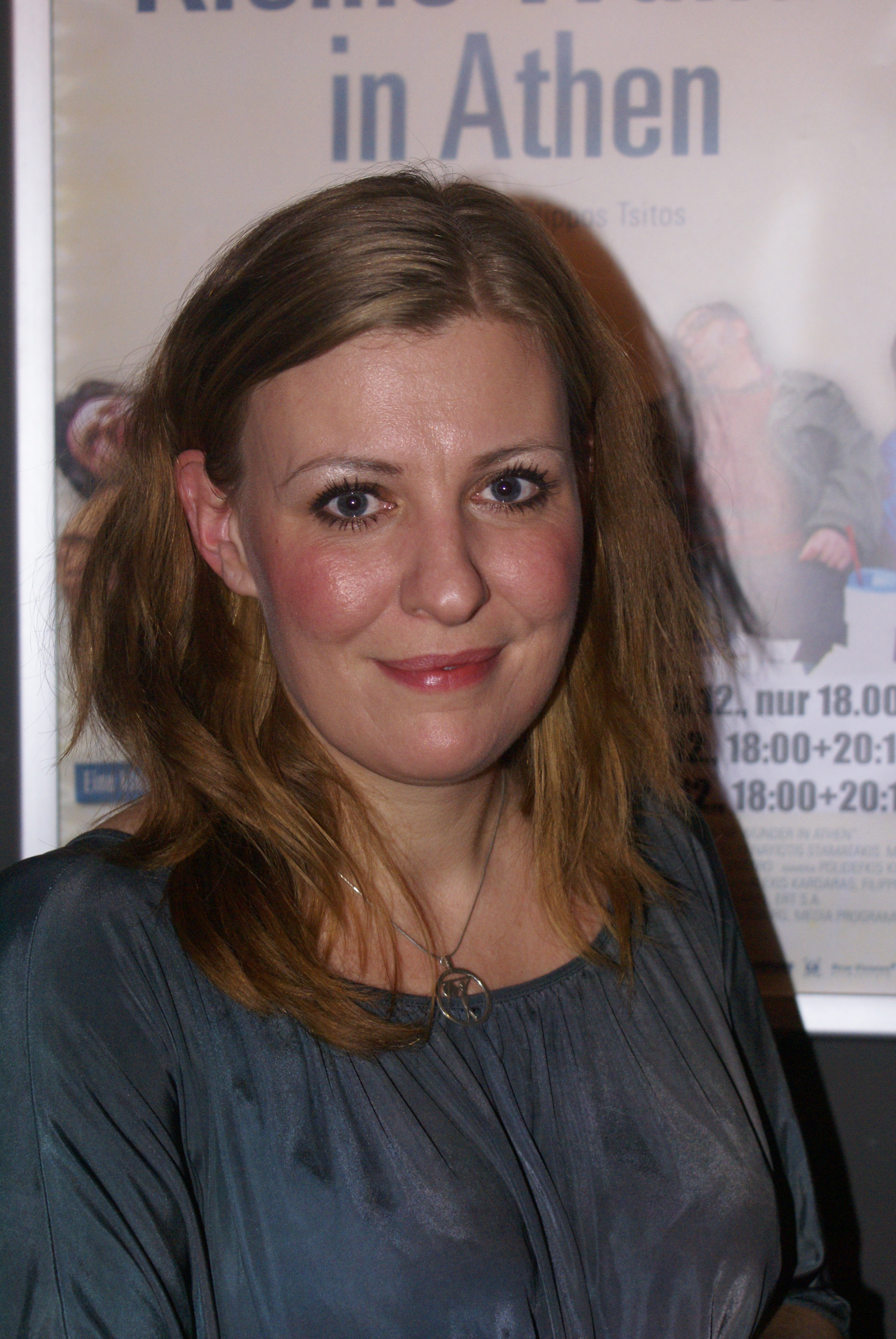

Background information
- Born: Ida Kristina Sand; 5 November 1977 (age 48); Stockholm, Sweden
- Genres: Jazz
- Occupation: Musician
- Instruments: Vocals, piano
- Label: ACT

Ida Kristina Sand (born 5 November 1977) is a Swedish jazz singer and pianist.

Ida Sand was born in Stockholm, and studied music at Högskolan för scen och musik in University of Gothenburg. She debuted as a guest artist at Nils Landgrens Christmas with My Friends in 2006 releasing her solo debut album Meet Me Around Midnight in 2007. She is signed to ACT label. Sand is married to guitar player Ola Gustafsson. Ida Sand is the daughter of Staffan Sandlund, an opera singer.

== Discography ==
=== Albums ===
| Year | Album | Peak positions |
| Year | Album | SWE |
|---|---|---|
| 2007 | Meet Me Around Midnight | – |
| 2009 | True Love | – |
| 2011 | The Gospel Truth | 23 |
| 2015 | Young at Heart | 52 |
