= Eva Kruse =

German jazz musician and composer (born 1978)

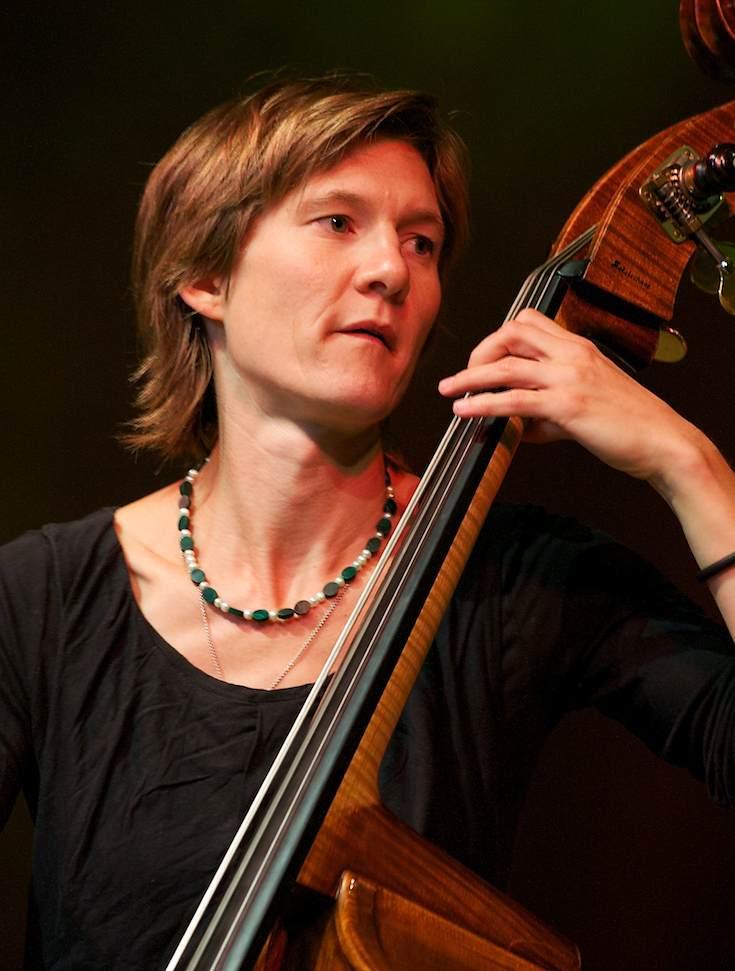
- Kruse at a concert in 2010

Background information
- Born: 16 October 1978 (age 47); Hamburg, West Germany
- Genres: Jazz
- Occupation: Musician
- Instruments: Upright bass, bass guitar
- Labels: ACT
- Website: evakruse.com

Eva Kruse (born 16 October 1978) is a German jazz musician (upright bass, bass guitar) and composer.

== Biography ==
Kruse was raised in Brunsbek in Schleswig-Holstein. In her childhood and youth, she received eleven years of classical piano lessons and at the age of fourteen, at the suggestion of a teacher, began to learn the bass guitar. She played in the school big band and the Bargteheider Vorstadtkrokodilen. After she was admitted to the Landesjugend-Jazz-Orchester Schleswig-Holstein at the age of 18, she decided to switch to upright bass. In 1998 Kruse moved to Berlin, to study at the Universität der Künste with Sigi Busch, Jerry Granelli and David Friedman with the double bass as the main instrument "Jazz / Improvisation". In 2000, she refined her technical playing on double bass during a semester abroad in Gothenburg with Anders Jormin. She also took courses with John Taylor, who encouraged her to write her own compositions for various occupations. Her musical role models on the double bass include Dave Holland, Gary Peacock and Anders Jormin.

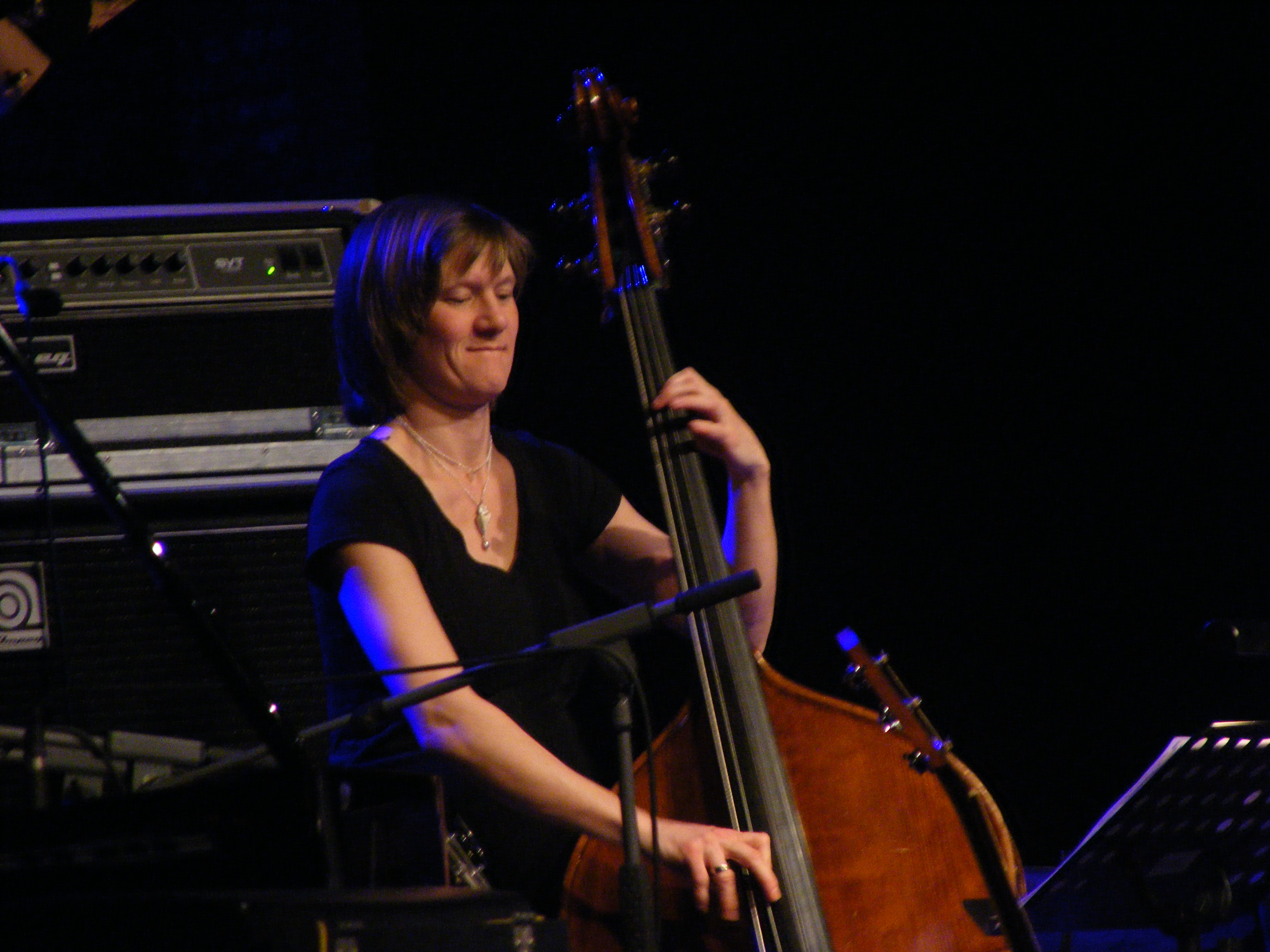
Kruse at Jazzfestival St. Ingbert 2009

During her studies Kruse played smaller tours with the April Light Orchestra and the Tied & Tickled Trio from Weilheim and from 1998 to 2000 under Peter Herbolzheimer in BuJazzO. While at BuJazzO and studying in Berlin, she met pianist Michael Wollny and drummer Eric Schaefer. They played together since 2002 and founded the trio [em]; This was followed by concert tours, festival appearances and the release of a total of four CDs. In 2009 they were awarded the BMW Welt Jazz Award, in 2011 the New German Jazz Award.

Together with Eric Schaefer and the guitarist Arne Jansen she played in the Arne Jansen Trio. From this collaboration, the album My Tree und Younger Than That Now was released. She also plays with Arne Jansen, Niels Klein and Nils Tegen in the quartet Firomanum, as well as in the Berlin pop / jazz / electronic band SOAP.

Kruse has a special relationship to the Schleswig-Holstein festival Jazz Baltica. She worked there often at the opening concert and played u. a. with [em], Firomanum, saxophonist Bunky Green, and the Jazz Baltica Ensemble under the direction of Johannes Enders. There she also met the Swedish trombonist Nils Landgren who invited her to various projects. So she worked among others in his ensemble New Eyes on Bach founded in 2007, and accompanied him on his annual Christmas with My Friends tour. In recent years, she led her own groups, which receive an unusual timbre by the juxtaposition of oboe and soprano saxophone.

== Honors ==
- In 2011 and 2013 she was awarded the Echo Jazz (Ensemble of the year national) with the trio [em].
- Kruse also received Echo Jazz as best bassist (national) in 2015 and 2017 for her albums In Water and On the Mo.

== Discography ==
- Firomanum: Firomanum (schönerhören, 2003)
- [em]: Call It [em] (ACT, 2005)
- Young Friends: The Great German Songbook (ACT, 2005, with Axel Schlosser, Florian Trübsbach, Johannes Lauer, Michael Wollny, Eric Schaefer)
- Firomanum: Scope (Traumton, 2006)
- SOAP: busca busca! (Height Mansion Productions 2007, with Hendrik Stiller, Lars Dieterich, Pelle Hinrichsen)
- Bunky Green: The Salzau Quartett Live at Jazz Baltica (Traumton, 2008)
- Arne Jansen Trio: Younger Than That Now (Traumton/INDIGO, 2008)
- Wollny / Kruse / Schaefer: [em] live (ACT, 2010)
- In Water (Redhorn Records, 2014, Tjadina Würdinger, Uwe Steinmetz, Bugge Wesseltoft, Christian Jormin)
- On the Mo (Redhorn Records, 2016, with Tjadina Würdinger, Uwe Steinmetz, Christian Jormin, Eric Schaefer)
