= Julia Hülsmann =

German pianist and composer (born 1968)

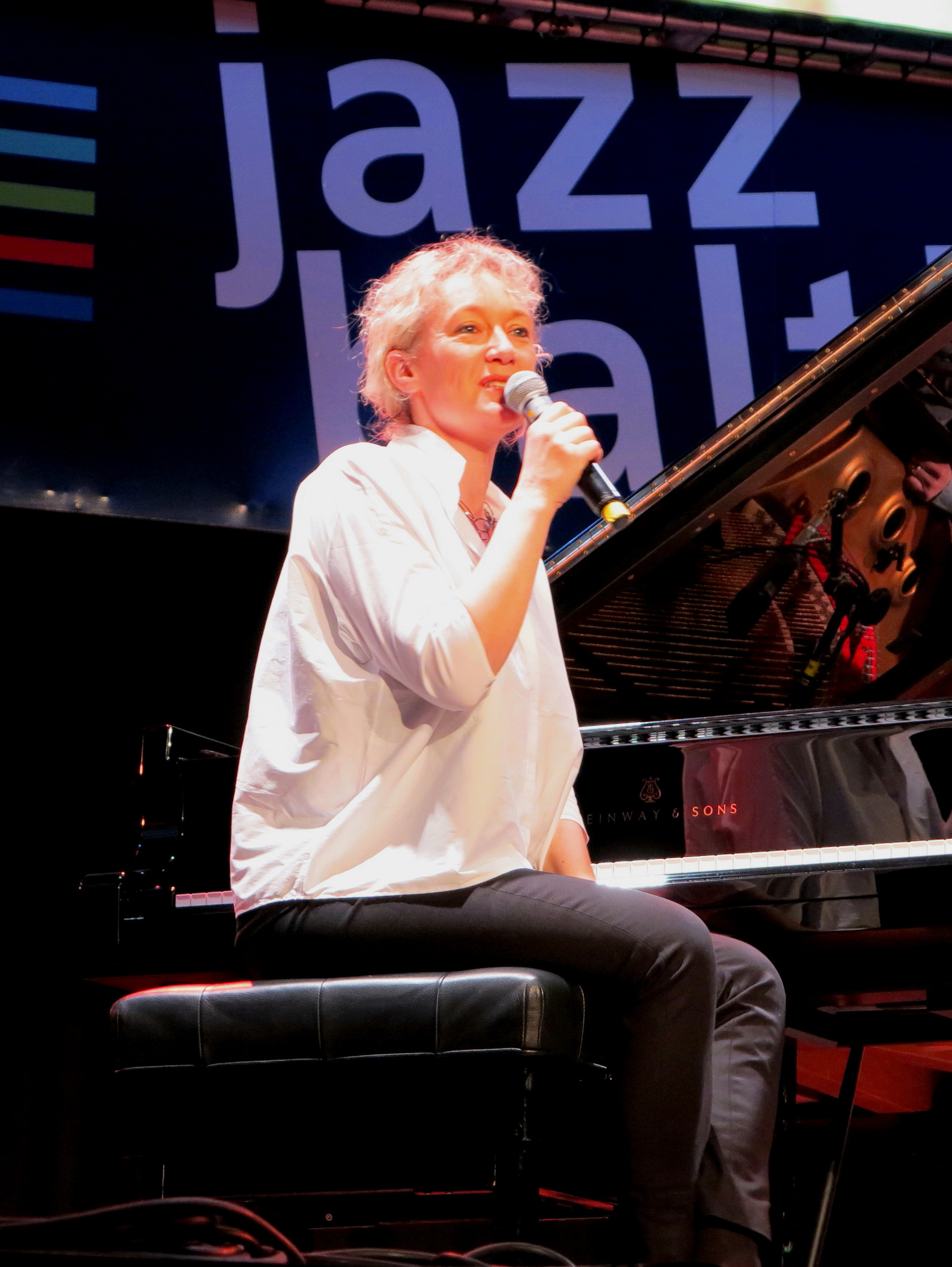
Julia Hülsmann

Julia Hülsmann (born 17 July 1968 in Bonn, West Germany) is a German jazz pianist and composer. Her compositions are often based on literary works, especially poetry.

== Biography ==
Hülsmann received music lessons from the age of eleven, and like both of her parents, she plays the piano. As a teenager, she heard a lot of pop music, with particular songwriters like Sting or Randy Newman impressed her. Mediated by her piano teacher, she heard and played music by Chick Corea, Bill Evans, Michael Brecker and Miles Davis.

During her schooldays, she played keyboards and piano in various ensemble instrumentations. After a short period in Frankfurt am Main she moved to Berlin. She was trained as a piano teacher and earned a degree in jazz piano at the Berlin University of the Arts in 1991. Her teachers include Walter Norris, Aki Takase and David Friedman. In particular, she was inspired and influenced by US pianist and composer Don Grolnick. In 1992, Hülsmann joined the Federal Youth Jazz Orchestra, then directed by Peter Herbolzheimer. After graduating in 1996, together with bassist Marc Muellbauer and drummer Rainer Winch she founded the Julia Hülsmann Trio. The trio played music, initially borrowed mainly from the standard repertoire of jazz, at various festivals and smaller tours. In early 2000, Hülsmann took lessons while studying in New York with Richie Beirach, Maria Schneider, Gil Goldstein and Jane Ira Bloom.

At a concert by Wolfgang Muthspiel she got to know the Norwegian singer Rebekka Bakken. Hülsmann began writing or composing for Bakken and released her debut CD Trio.at the end of 2000 with her trio. After writing some compositions, the difficult path to finding suitable lyrics for the vocal project began. She eventually discovered the poet E. E. Cummings. She won Bakken for her project, and in 2003 the album Scattering Poems appeared. It was several weeks in the German Top 10 jazz releases.

Hülsmanns 's next project was a hommage to the American songwriter Randy Newman. She rearranged several of his songs. At the suggestion of bassist Dieter Ilg, Hülsmann invited the Italian singer Anna Lauvergnac, who also performed with the Vienna Art Orchestra, among others. In 2004, the edited pieces were released on the ACT label on the album Come Closer.

In her subsequent project Hülsmann worked together with the singer Roger Cicero. Once again she was inspired by poems in her compositions; this time from the pen of the American poet Emily Dickinson, and the album Good Morning Midnight was released in 2006. With her trio in the cast with bassist Marc Muellbauer and drummer Heinrich Köbberling, she recorded the album The End of a Summer exclusively with her own compositions (released in 2008 on the label ECM). In addition to her own trio Hülsmann also appeared as a pianist in the United Women’s Orchestra, as a guest musician with Judy Niemack, in the quintet of Meike Goosmann or as a duo with Angelika Niescier.

Since 2001 she also has a teaching assignment at the Berlin University of the Arts and holds composition workshops at the Hochschule für Musik und Theater in Hannover. From 2012 until the end of 2013 she was the chairman of the Union of German Jazz Musicians. As the successor to Michael Schiefel, she was able to give impulses to the music scene Moers throughout the year 2014, as an "improviser in residence".

== Honors ==
The album Scattering Poems has received the gold German Jazz Award.

In 2008 the trio of Hülsmann received the Jazzpott of the poster art Hof Rüttenscheid in Essen. In April 2010 she was invited to the (third) German Jazz Meeting with her trio. As co-initiator of the 2012 founding of the Union Deutscher Jazzmusiker erhielt sie 2016 den Ehrenpreis des WDR Jazzpreis. She was awarded the Honorary Prize of the 2016 WDR Jazz Prize. In addition, she received the SWR Jazz Prize as a musician, "which gives jazz in Europe pioneering impulses" the same year.

== Discography ==
Year recorded	Title	Label	Personnel/Notes
2000?	Trio	BIT	Trio, with Muellbauer, Winch
2003?	Scattering Poems	ACT	with Rebekka Bakken
2004?	Come Closer	ACT	with Anna Lauvergnac
2006?	Good Morning Midnight	ACT	with Roger Cicero
2008	The End of a Summer	ECM	Trio, with Marc Muellbauer (bass), Heinrich Köbberling (drums)
2008	Fasıl	ECM	Co-led with Marc Sinan (guitar), Yelena Kuljić (vocals), Lena Thies (viola), Marc Muellbauer (bass)
2011?	Imprint	ECM	Trio, with Marc Muellbauer (bass), Heinrich Köbberling (drums)
2013?	In Full View	ECM	Quartet, with Tom Arthurs (trumpet, flugelhorn), Marc Muellbauer (bass), Heinrich Köbberling (drums)
2014	A Clear Midnight: Kurt Weill and America	ECM	Quartet, with Tom Arthurs (trumpet, flugelhorn), Marc Muellbauer (bass), Theo Bleckmann (vocals)
2016	Sooner and Later	ECM	Trio, with Marc Muellbauer (bass), Heinrich Köbberling (drums)
2019	Not Far From Here	ECM	Quartet, with Uli Kempendorff (Tenor Saxophone), Marc Muellbauer (Double Bass), Heinrich Köbberling (Drums)
2022	The Next Door	ECM	Quartet, with Uli Kempendorff (Tenor Saxophone), Marc Muellbauer (Double Bass), Heinrich Köbberling (Drums)
2025	While I Was Away	ECM	Octet, with Aline Frazão (vocalist), Héloïse Lefebvre (violin), Susanne Paul (cello), Julia Hülsmann (piano), Eva Kruse (doublebass), Eva Klesse (drum), Michael Schiefel (vocalist), Live Maria Roggen (vocalist)
