= Hương Thanh =

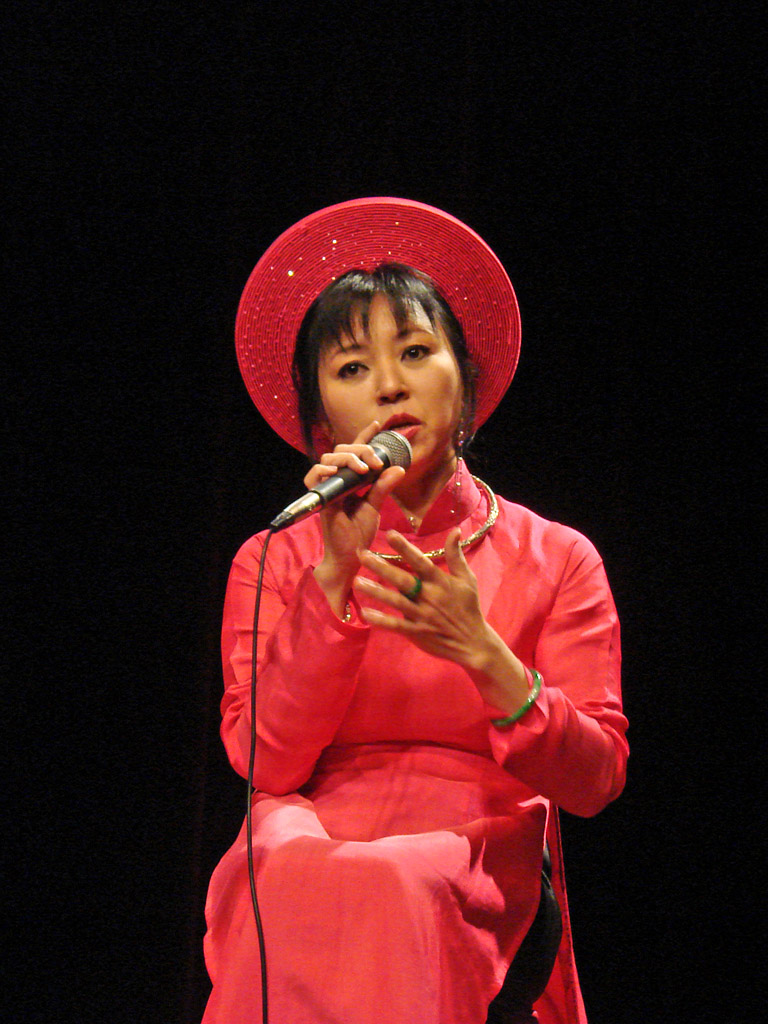
Thanh at the Musée Guimet, Paris, 2007

Hương Thanh is a Vietnamese singer of various genres, including Cai Luong and jazz fusion. In 2007, France Musique honored her with the Musique du monde award. Her early discography includes Chuyện ba người (1995), Moon and Wind (ACT Music, 1999), and Tales from Vietnam, de Nguyên Lê (ACT Music, 1996).

== Family ==
Hương Thanh was born in Saigon to a family of South Vietnamese musicians. Her father, Hữu Phước (died 1997), was a master of Cải lương singing.

== Career ==
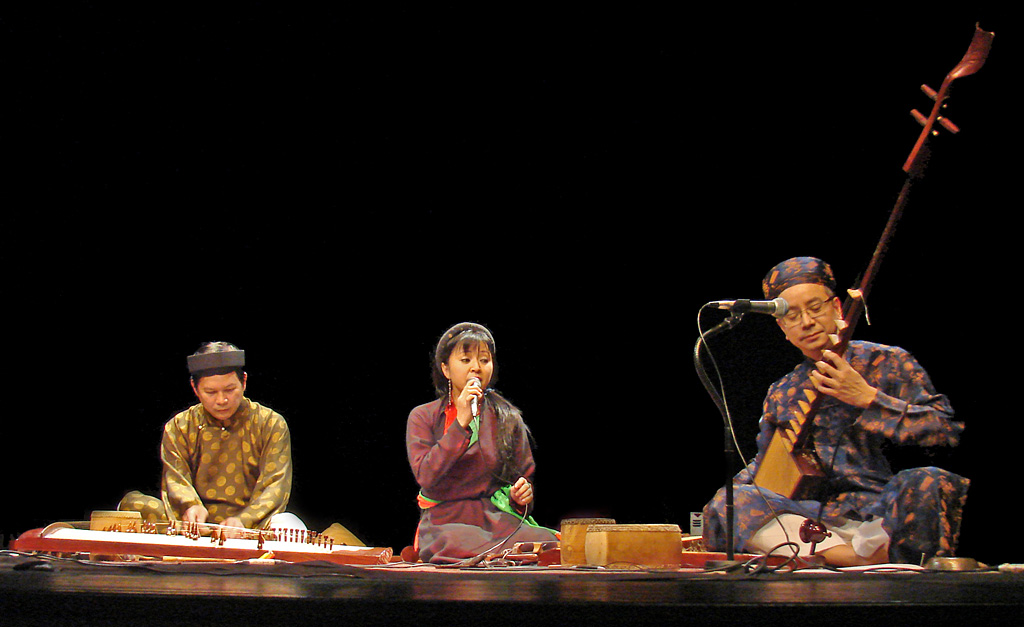
Huong Thanh Trio

In 1995, she met the Vietnamese guitarist Nguyên Lê, who was her first contact with jazz and world music. In 1996, she sang at the invitation of UNESCO to celebrate the anniversary of the Declaration of Human Rights. With her sister, Hương Lan, she recorded in Los Angeles, California, US in 1997.
