= Ramón Valle =

Cuban jazz pianist (born 1964)

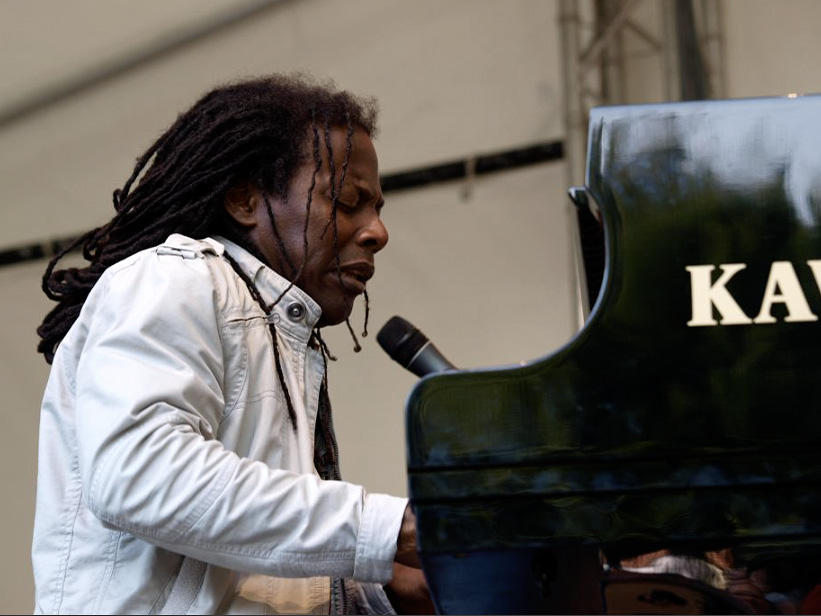
- Ramón Valle, offside Festival 2008

Background information
- Born: December 29, 1964 (age 61); Holguín, Cuba
- Genres: Jazz
- Occupations: Musician, composer
- Instrument: Piano
- Website: ramonvalle.com

Luis Ramón Valle Sánchez (born December 29, 1964) (Note: This is according to his own website. Other sources give October 29, 1964. See "Artist Biography". AllMusic. Retrieved November 6, 2015.) is a Cuban jazz pianist and composer.

== Life and career ==
Valle was born on December 29, 1964, in Holguín, Cuba. He left Cuba in the 1990s.

== Playing style ==
An NPR reviewer of Valle's Take Off commented that "When Ramon Valle keeps it crisp, he can hardly go wrong, with percolating bass and drums at his back. But the pianist also has a more romantic, even schmaltzy side, where he tries to wow you with a ballad. Then he may show off his technique in a way that doesn't help".

== Discography ==
An asterisk (*) after the year indicates that it is the year of release.

=== As leader/co-leader ===
| Year recorded | Title | Label | Notes |
|---|---|---|---|
| 2001 | Danza Negra | ACT | Quintet, with Perico Sambeat (alto sax, soprano sax), Carlos Puig (trumpet), Omar Rodriguez (bass), Horacio 'El Negro' Hernandez (drums) |
| 2004* | No Escape | ACT | Trio, with Omar Rodríguez Calvo (bass), Liber Torriente (drums) |
| 2005 | Piano Works IV: Memorias | ACT | Solo piano |
| 2008 | Fabulas | Budapest Music Center | With Eric Vloeimans (trumpet), Gabor Winand (vocals) |
| 2009* | Playground | RVS | Trio, with Omar Rodríguez Calvo (bass), Owen Hart, Jr. (drums) |
| 2011 | Flashes from Holland | RVS | Quartet, with Jesse van Ruller (guitar), Omar Rodríguez Calvo (bass), Owen Hart, Jr. (drums) |
| 2015* | Take Off | In + Out | Trio, with Omar Rodríguez Calvo (bass), Ernesto Simpson (drums) |
| 2017* | The Time is Now | In + Out | Trio, with Omar Rodríguez Calvo (bass), Jamie Peet (drums) |

=== As sideman ===
| Year recorded | Leader | Title | Label |
|---|---|---|---|
| 2014–15 | Gerardo Núñez | Jazzpaña Live | ACT |
