= Chris Gall =

German pianist

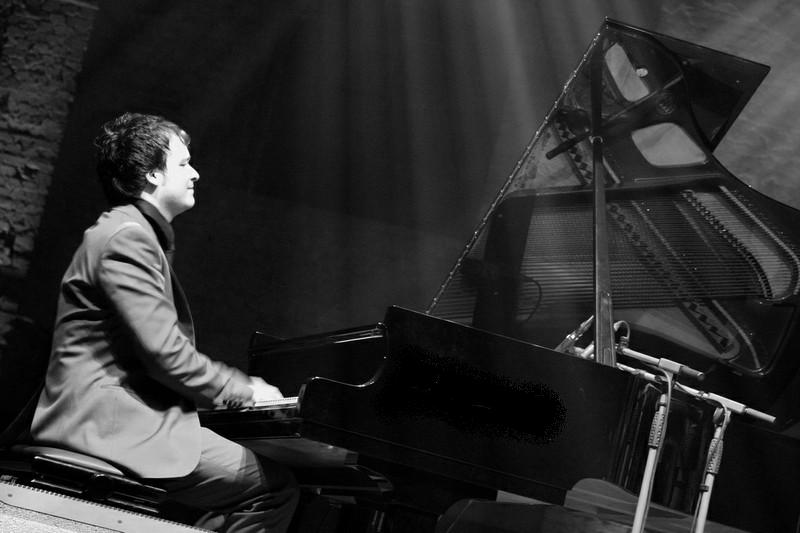
- Chris Gall at the 2008 Jazz Festival St. Ingbert
- Born: July 11, 1975 (age 50); Bad Aibling, Germany
- Occupations: Jazz pianist Composer

Chris Gall (born 11 July 1975) is a German jazz pianist and composer.

== Biography ==
Gall studied classical piano at the Berklee College of Music in Boston, USA. In 1998 he finished jazz studies there. He released the album Piano Solo in 2015.

Gall was a regular member of the band of Giana Viscardi, with whom he performed at the 2001 Montreux Jazz Festival. He also played piano with the Indian fusion band Taalsim featuring Shakir Khan (sitar) and Kai Eckhardt (bass guitar). He also appeared with the New York Voices (Grammy Award winner) as well as with Chico César, Dusko Goykovich, Don Menza and Bobby Shew.

Gall, who also plays pop and world music, was signed to ACT in 2007, where he released the album Climbing Up with electro-pop artist Enik. He is also a part of the jazz-soul band The Hi-Fly Orchestra, with whom he performed internationally. In duo with the guitarist Andreas Dombert, he released the album Duo (Acoustic Music). At the beginning of 2014, he traveled to Argentina as a guest musician with the band Quadro Nuevo and also participated as pianist, composer, and arranger on the band's album Tango! He can also be heard on albums by Norbert Küppers Riovolt and Mariette Radtke.

== Discography (in selection) ==
=== Solo albums ===
- 1999: Vibes of Boston (HoHe-Musik), with Christian Gall Trio
- 2008: Climbing Up (ACT), with Chris Gall Trio (Marcel Krömker, Peter Gall) feat. Enik
- 2010: Hello Stranger (ACT), with Chris Gall Trio (Axel Kühn, Peter Gall) feat. Enik
- 2014: Duo (Acoustic Music Records), duo with Andreas Dombert
- 2015: Piano Solo (GLM Music)
- 2017: Studio Konzert (Neuklang), duo with Bernhard Schimpelsberger
- 2018: Cosmic Playground (Edition Collage), with Chris Gall Trio

=== Collaborations ===
- 2006: Metamorphosis (Altrisuoni), with Rafael Baier Group
- 2007: Circle of Taals (Quinton), with Taalis
- 2008: Mambo Atomico (Tramp Records), with The Hi-Fly Orchestra
- 2009: Solitude (Double Moon), with Metamorphosis feat. Ingrid Lukas
- 2012: Self-fulfilling Prophecies (GLM music), with Ecco DiLorenzo Jazz Quartet
- 2013: Get Ready (Agogo Records), with The Hi-Fly Orchestra
