= Arne Jansen =

German jazz guitarist

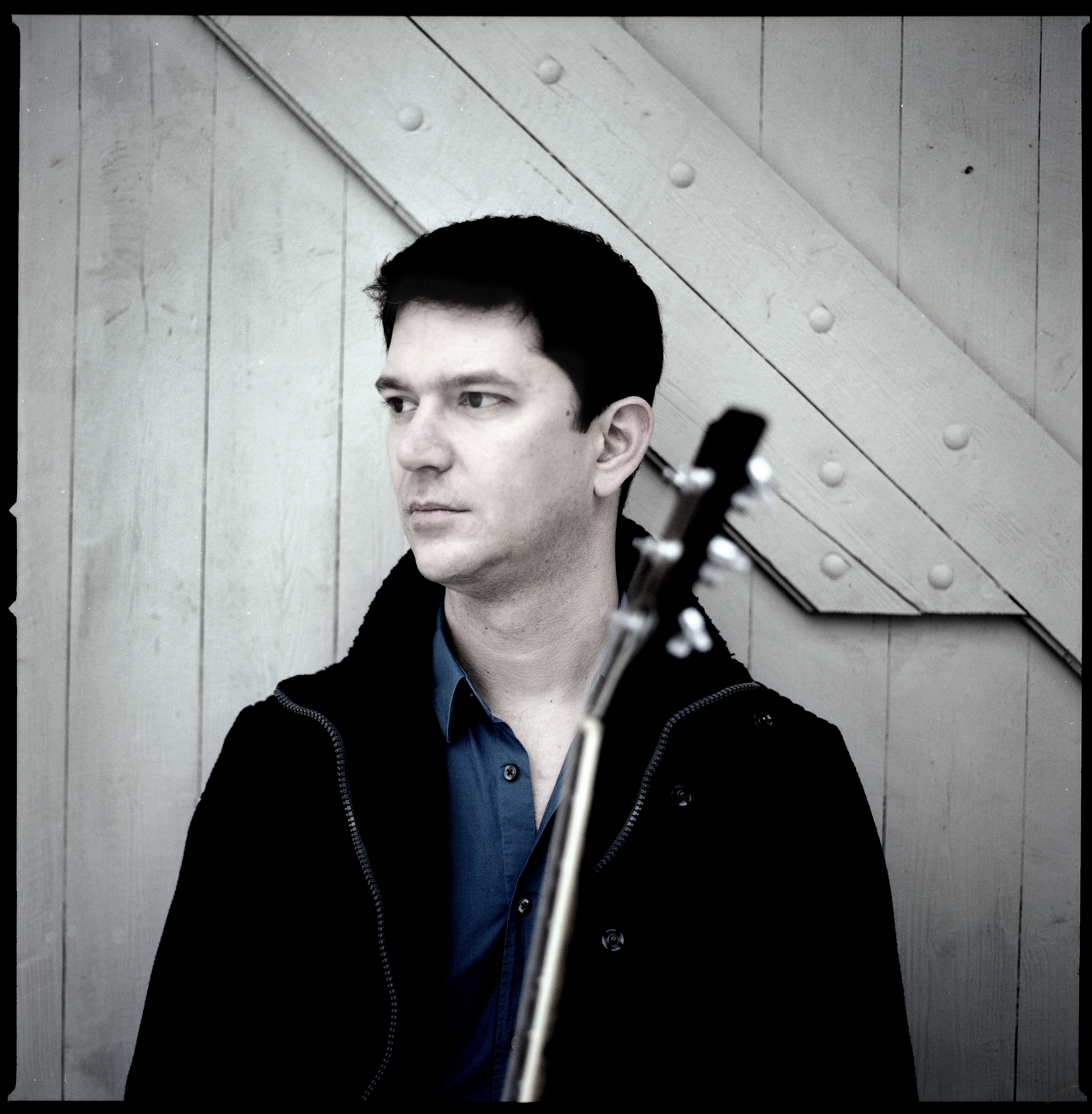

Background information
- Born: 26 November 1975; Kiel, Germany
- Genres: Jazz
- Occupations: Musician, composer
- Instrument: Guitar
- Years active: 1987–present
- Labels: Traumton, ACT
- Website: arnejansen.com

Arne Jansen (born 26 November 1975) is a German jazz guitarist.

== Biography ==
As a teenager Jansen picked up the guitar, inspired by Jimi Hendrix and the Dire Straits. The great storytellers of pop, such as Bob Dylan and Joni Mitchell also belonged to his early sources of inspiration such as the Beatles and Pink Floyd, who he discovered in his parents' record collection. At the age of 17 he discovered the music of Pat Metheny and John Scofield, which opened up new horizons for him. Then Jansen studied jazz guitar at the Berlin University of the Arts (1996-2001), with Jeanfrancois Prins, David Friedman, Sigi Busch, and Peter Weniger. He has also studied guitar with Pat Metheny, Mick Goodrick, John Abercrombie, Kurt Rosenwinkel, and Philip Catherine. From 1998-2000 he was a member of the National Youth Jazz Orchestra of Germany, conducted by Peter Herbolzheimer, and was on concert tours with numerous ensembles through the US, Japan, Argentina, Scandinavia, Turkey, Russia, Ukraine and south-east Europe. Fellow artists and ensembles include the band Naked Raven, musicians Paul Van Dyk, Jocelyn B. Smith and Tim Fischer, in addition to the DanGer (Danish-German Jazzsextett), Fitzwilliam String Quartet, and the Film Orchestra Babelsberg.

Collaborative work as guitarist with Michael Thalheimer & Bert Wrede for the production of Shakespeare's "As You Like It" at the German Theatre Berlin, 2008. With the Arne Jansen Trio he gave concerts at the Jazzfest Berlin 2008, Enjoy Jazz 2008, Jazz Baltica 2009, Jazzahead-German Jazz Meeting 2010, Jazz Utsav-Festival Delhi, India 2014, X-Jazz Festival Berlin 2015, Jazz Baltica 2015, Africa-Tour 2017 (Angola, Mozambique, Senegal), Collaboration with "Orchestra Baobab" (Senegal). Continuous work with his trio, Katja Riemann, Jazzanova, Nils Wülker Group, and Matthias Schweighöfer.

== Honors ==
- 2007: Prize-winner at the Berlin Senate's Studio-Competition with the Arne Jansen Trio
- 2014: Winner of Echo Jazz award for the album The Sleep of Reason – Ode to Goya, with the Arne Jansen Trio
- 2017: Winner of Echo Jazz award for the album Nine Firmaments, with the Arne Jansen Trio

== Discography ==
=== Solo albums ===
- 2006: My Tree (Traumton Records), with Arne Jansen Trio
- 2008: Younger Than That Now (Traumton Records), with Arne Jansen Trio
- 2013: The Sleep of Reason – Ode to Goya (ACT ) (awarded Echo Jazz)
- 2016: Nine Firmaments (Traumton Records), with Arne Jansen Trio (awarded Echo Jazz)

=== Collaborations ===
With Firomanum (Arne Jansen, Eva Kruse, Niels Klein, Nils Tegen)

- 2002: New Old Tendency (SATRip)
- 2006: Frames (Traumton Records)

With Nils Wülker

- 2010: 6 (Ear Treat Music)
- 2012: Just Here, Just Now (Ear Treat Music)
- 2015: Up (Warner Music)
- 2017: On (Warner Music)
- 2018: Decade Live (Warner Music)
- 2020: Go (Warner Music)
- 2023: Closer (Warner Music)
- 2024: In Concert (Warner Music)

With BuJazzO

- 1987: On Tour (Mons Records), with Bundesjugendjazzorchester
- 1999: Das Jugendjazzorchester Der Bundesrepublik Deutschland (Gerling), with Peter Herbolzheimer

The New Cool Trio (David Helbock, Sebastian Studnitzky, Arne Jansen)

- 2021: The New Cool (ACT)
