= Majid Bekkas =

Moroccan jazz fusion musician

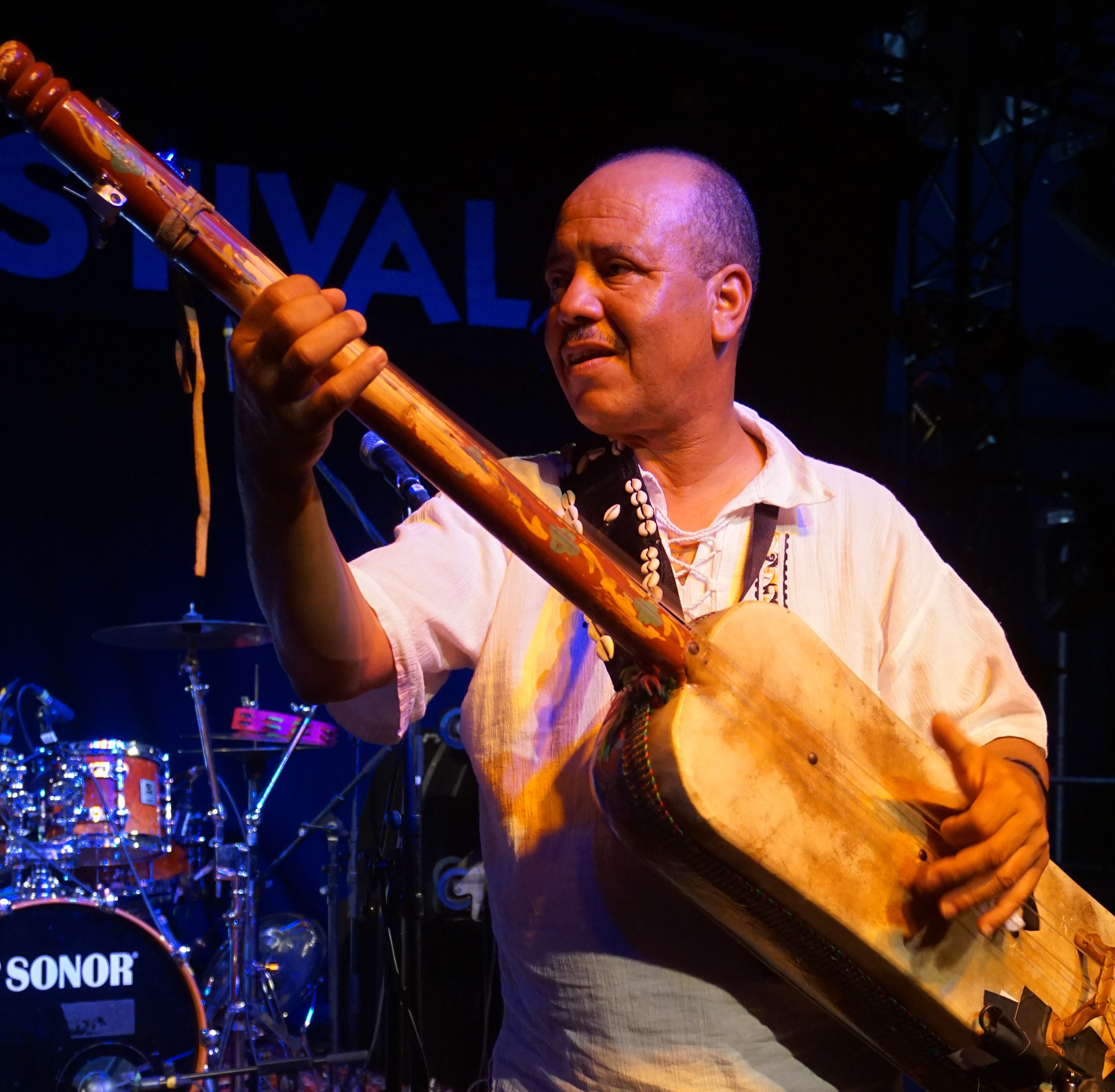
- Majid Bekkas at Africa Festival Würzburg 2015

Background information
- Born: 1957 (age 68–69); Salé, Morocco
- Genres: Folk rock, Ethno jazz
- Occupations: Musician, Composer
- Instruments: guembri, oud, guitar, vocals
- Years active: 1990–present
- Labels: Igloo records, ACT Music
- Website: www.facebook.com/Majidbekkas/

Majid Bekkas (Arabic: مجيد بقاس, born 1957), also known as Abdelmajid Bekkas, is a Moroccan musician on guembri, oud, guitar and vocals, who is internationally known for his contributions to folk rock and Ethno jazz with North African roots.

== Artistic career ==
His album Magic Spirit Quartet, with young Scandinavian musicians and produced by the jazz label ACT Music in 2020, was a considerable success, with appreciations in the international press, such as in the BBC Musical Magazine 7 and the American Downbeat magazine, where the disc was selected as Editor's choice of February 2020In his youth, Bekkas played banjo in Moroccan groups in the style of Nass El Ghiwane. From 1975, he studied classical guitar at the Conservatory for Music and Dance in Rabat. Later, he was initiated into the tradition of Gnawa music by maâlem (master musician) Ba Houmane, and the guembri, a bass lute characteristic of this African spiritual music style, became his main instrument.

In 1990, he founded the Gnaoua Blues Band, playing a fusion of Afro-American blues and Gnawa music. In the following years, he started to incorporate elements of jazz fusion into his own music and played with numerous international jazz musicians. (Among others, with Louis Sclavis, Archie Shepp, Randy Weston, Klaus Doldinger, Joachim Kühn, Peter Brötzmann or Hamid Drake). Since 1996, Bekkas has been artistic co-director of the festival Jazz au Chellah in Rabat.

Outside of Morocco, Bekkas performed at international festivals such as WOMEX Seville 2003 in Spain, Africa Festival Würzburg 2015 or at the Berlin Jazz Festival in Germany as soloist, in trio formations and in other world music projects.

In 2002, Spanish percussionist Ramón López invited him to work on his tribute album for Roland Kirk. In 2006, Bekkas joined a jazz fusion trio with Joachim Kühn and Ramón López, that released its fifth album on ACT Music in August 2013. With Klaus Doldinger and his jazz band Passport, Bekkas first went on stage in Morocco in 2006, and was invited later to join this group for concerts in Germany.

His album Magic Spirit Quartet, with young Scandinavian musicians and produced by ACT Music in 2020, was a considerable success, with appreciations in the international press, such as in the BBC Music Magazine, Jazz Journal and DownBeat magazine. His music has been acclaimed as "expertly crafted, drawing you in with its low key yet infectious grooves."

In October 2022, Bekkas and his band toured in the U.S., with concerts in Los Angeles, New Orleans and other cities.

== Artistic recognition and awards ==
Bekkas' song Daymallah is the opening track on the album Desert Blues 2, which was voted the Best Compilation of 2002 by leading music journalists and producers for fRoots magazine.

In 2004, he received the European jazz award Django d’Or for his album Mogador. The album Passport to Morocco by German jazz musician Klaus Doldinger's band Passport, in which he participated as guest musician and composer, received a German Jazz Award in 2009. In 2010, Bekkas was awarded the Al Farabi Prize by the Comité National de la Musique in Morocco for his contribution to Moroccan music. In 2015, he received the award of the Académie Charles-Cros in France for his album Al Qantara., and in February 2020, his album Magic Spirit Quartet was selected by DownBeat magazine as 'Editor's Choice'.

== Discography ==
- African Gnaoua Blues, with Rachid Zeroual, Khalid Kouhen, Paolo Radoni and Marc Lelangue (Igloo Records, 2001)
- Nomad Spirit, with Abaji, Djivan Gasparian, Ramesh Shotham (Network, 2005)
- Passport to Morocco, as guest artist in Klaus Doldinger's band Passport, (Warner, 2006)
- Kalimba, with Joachim Kühn and Ramón López (ACT Records, 2007)
- Marula in All with Uwe Kropinski, Michael Heupel, Aly Keïta (Morgenland Records, 2008)
- Out of the Desert, with Joachim Kühn and Ramón López (ACT Records, 2009)
- Makemba, with Louis Sclavis, Minino Garay, Aly Keïta, Serge Marne, Abdelfettah Houssaini, Abdessadek Bounhar, Rachid el Fadli, Joseph Bessam Kouassi (Igloo Records, 2010)
- Chalaba, with Joachim Kühn and Ramón López (ACT Records, 2011)
- Out Of The Desert Live At Jazzfest Berlin, with Joachim Kühn, Ramón López and the HR Big Band (ACT Records, 2011)
- Voodoo Sense, with Joachim Kühn, Ramón López and Archie Shepp (ACT Records, 2013)
- Mabrouk, with Ablaye Cissoko and Khalid Kouhen (Bee Jazz, 2013)
- Al Qantara, with Manuel Hermia and Khalid Kouhen (Igloo Records, 2013)
- Magic Spirit Quartet, with Goran Kajfeš, Jesper Nordenström and Stefan Pasborg (ACT Records, 2020). Downbeat Editor's Choice Feb 2020
- Joudour, with Manuel Hermia, Childo Tomas, Karim Ziad, Michael Hornek and Khalid Kouhen (Igloo, 2022)

In 2013, German filmmaker Christoph Hübner made a documentary film about the trio Kühn/Bekkas/Lopez during the preparations and recording of one of their albums in Morocco.

== See also ==
- Gnawa music
- Music of Morocco
