= Alboran Trio =

Italian jazz piano trio

- Origin: Piedmont and Lombardy, Italy
- Genres: Jazz
- Years active: 2004-present
- Label: ACT Music
- Members: Paolo Paliaga; Gigi Biolcati; Dino Contenti

Alboran Trio is an Italian jazz piano trio consisting of Paolo Paliaga (piano), Gigi Biolcati and now Ferdinando Faraò (drums and percussion) and Dino Contenti (bass). The name is derived from the uninhabited Mediterranean island of Alborán, which lies between the Andalusian coast and North Africa. It is intended both to emphasize a mystical atmosphere of music and to point to the influence of European musical tradition and the African roots of rhythm.

The trio was formed in 2004. After a 2005 tour of various Italian cities they released in 2006 their debut album Meltemi, which was on the whole well received by the press followed by several concerts in other European countries. In 2008, they released their second studio album, Near Gale. Both albums were released by German jazz label ACT Music.In 2020 the new CD "Islands" was released

== Discography ==
- 2006: Meltemi (ACT Music)
- 2008: Near Gale (ACT Music)
- 2020: Islands (Alboran Music)
