= Wolfgang Haffner =

German jazz drummer

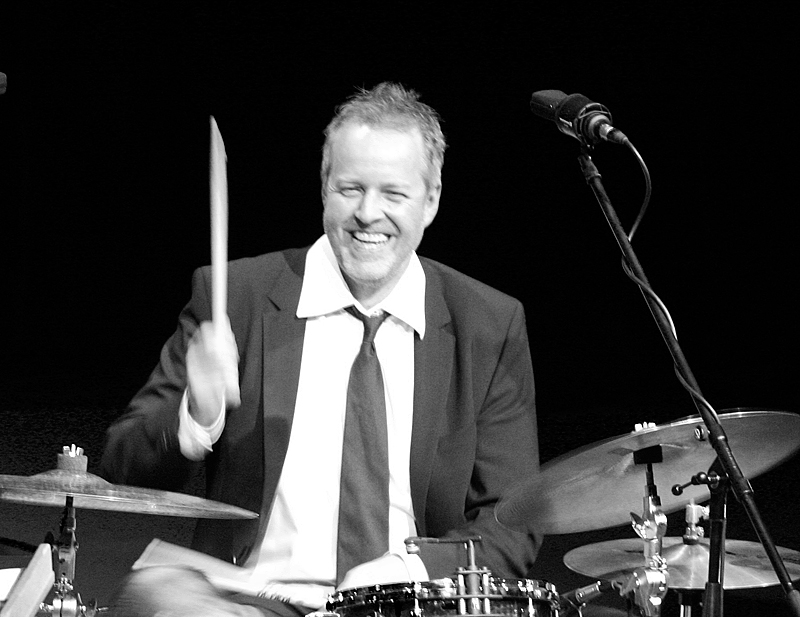
Wolfgang Haffner, February 2010

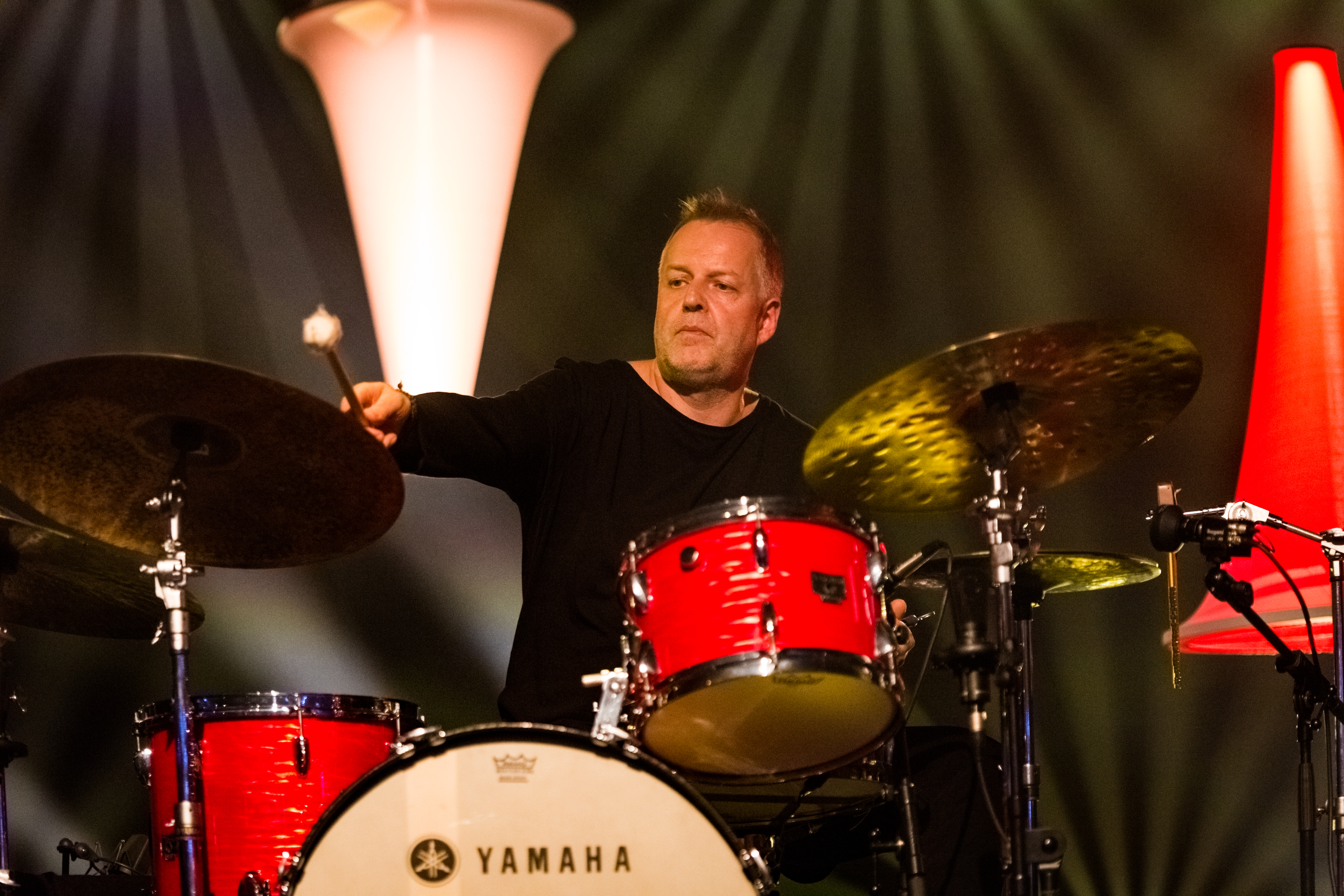
Wolfgang Haffner & Band live at Leverkusener Jazztage 2017

Wolfgang Haffner (born 7 December 1965) is a German jazz drummer with an extensive discography.

== Discography ==
- 2025 - Life Rhythm (Live) 2CD
- 2024 - Life Rhythm
- 2023 – Silent World
- 2020 – Kind of Tango
- 2019 – 4WD (with Nils Landgren)
- 2019 – The East End (with Bill Evans)
- 2017 – Kind of Spain (with Jan Lundgren, Sebastian Studnitzky, Daniel Stelter, Christopher Dell & Lars Danielsson)
- 2015 – Kind of Cool
- 2012 – Heart of the Matter (with Dominic Miller, Eythor Gunnarsson, Sebastian Studnitzky)
- 2011 – Gravity (with Lars Danielsson, Julian Wasserfuhr & Roman Wasserfuhr)
- 2010 – Wolfgang Haffner Edition
- 2009 – Round Silence
- 2008 – Acoustic Shapes
- 2007 – Express (with Metro)
- 2006 – Abracadabra: Celebrating Klaus Doldinger (with Roberto di Gioia & Dieter Ilg)
- 2006 – Shapes (Produced with Nils Landgren)
- 2004 – ZOOMING
- 2004 – Funky Abba (with Nils Landgren)
- 2003 – Music For Jazz Orchestra (with Albert Mangelsdorff and the NDR-Big-Band)
- 2002 – Live & Real
- 2002 – Grapevine (with Metro)
- 2002 – When The Angels Swing (with „No Angels“)
- 2001 – Urban Life
- 2000 – The German Jazz Masters Old Friends
- 2000 – Metrocafe (with Metro)
- 2000 – Swing Low Sweet Clarinet (with Eddie Daniels and hr-Big-Band)
- 1999 – Love (with Till Brönner)
- 1999 – Music
- 1998 – Zappelbude (with Roberto Di Gioia)
- 1998 – Celtic Moon (with Miller Anderson)
- 1997 – All the April Snow (with Peter Bolte)
- 1997 – Hut Ab! (with Albert Mangelsdorff)
- 1997 – Back Home
- 1996 – Beautiful Love (with Eddie Daniels)
- 1996 – One Kiss (with Carmen Cuesta)
- 1995 – Tree People (with Metro)
- 1994 – Metro (with Metro)
- 1992 – Movin‘ On
- 1990 – Balance of Happiness (with Klaus Doldingers Passport)
- 1987 – Al Cohn meets Al Porcino (with Al Cohn)
