= Johan Lindström (musician) =

Swedish musician, composer, arranger and record-producer (born 1972)

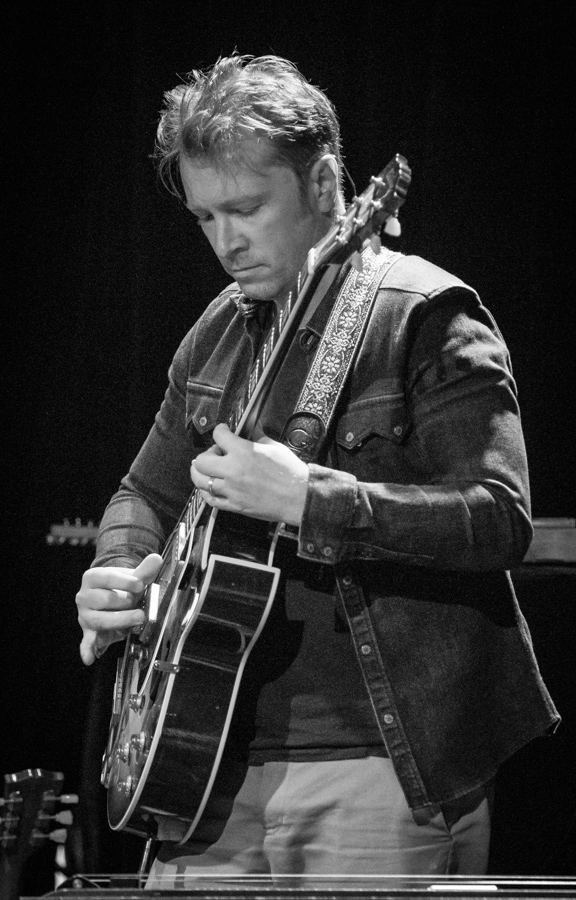
- Johan Lindström in concert with Tonbruket at Victoria Teater. The concert was part of Oslo Jazzfestival and took place on 15. August 2017

Background information
- Born: May 9, 1972 (age 52); Stockholm, Sweden
- Instruments: Guitar; piano; pedal steel

Johan Lindström is a musician, composer, arranger and record-producer based in Stockholm, Sweden. He has worked professionally, since 1991, as a musician, playing guitar, piano and pedal steel. He has performed and collaborated with artists including Tonbruket, Rebecka Thörnqvist, Ane Brun, Elvis Costello, Patti Smith, Nils Petter Molvaer, Sly & Robbie, Loney Dear, Graveyard, Susanne Sundføer, Anna Ternheim, Freddie Wadling, Ebbot Lundberg, Edda Magnason, Christian Kjellvander, and Goran Kajfes.

== History ==
Lindstrom is also a string/orchestral arranger.

As a composer, he writes instrumental music for the progressive jazz group Tonbruket and Johan Lindström Septett and other recording artists, including Rebecka Törnqvist (Home Secretary album) and Ane Brun (outro of the song "Last Breath"). He also started producing albums in the late 1990s.

In 1998, he joined Per "Texas" Johansson's band as a pedal steel player, where he met bass player Dan Berglund. They formed the band Tonbruket in 2009 along with piano player Martin Hederos and drummer Andreas Weerlin. Tonbruket have released six albums . Four of these albums received a Swedish Grammy Award in the Jazz category.

In 2017 he formed Johan Lindström Septett with Per "Texas" Johansson, Jonas Kullhammar, Konrad Agnas, Torbjörn Zetterberg, Mats Äleklint and Jesper Nordenström. The first album, Music for Empty Halls, came out in 2018. The second album, On the Asylum, came out in 2021.

In 2019, Lindstrom began composing a piece for trumpet, pedal steel and the Swedish wind ensemble called "Music for Valves and Pedals," commissioned by Swedish trumpet player Jonas Lindeborg.

In 2020, Lindstrom was made Composer in Residence for Norrbotten Big Band, for he composed 80 minutes of music. The music is inspired by Kurt Weill, Raymond Scott, Jan Johansson, Shostakovich, Perez Perado and was scheduled to be recorded in April 2021.

== Discography ==
As musician/composer
| Album artist | Album title | Release date | Awards |
|---|---|---|---|
| Tonbruket | Dan Berglund's Tonbruket | 2010 | Swedish Grammy Award (won) |
| Tonbruket | Dig it to the End | 2011 | Swedish Grammy Award (won) |
| Tonbruket | Nubium Swimtrip | 2013 | Swedish Grammy Award (won) |
| Tonbruket | Forevergreens | 2016 | Swedish Grammy Award (won) |
| Rebecka Törnqvist with Johan Lindström | Home Secretary | 2017 | |
| Tonbruket | Live Salvation | 2018 | |
| Johan Lindström Septett | Music for Empty Halls | 2018 | Swedish Grammy Award (nominated) |
| Tonbruket | Masters of Fog | 2019 | Swedish Grammy Award (nominated) |
| Johan Lindström Septett | On the Asylum | 2021 | Swedish Grammy Award (nominated) |

== Record producer ==
As record producer and co-producer

- Johan Lindström Septett "Music for empty halls", "On the asylum"
- Tonbruket "Masters of Fog", "Live Salvation", "Nubium Swimtrip", "Dig it to the end", "Forevergreens"
- Rebecka Törnqvist "Home Secretary", "Melting into orange", "The cherry blossom"
- Sofie Livebrandt "Emely and I", "Lighthouse Stories"
- Edda Magnason "Woman travels alone"
- Totta Näslund "In the basement", "7 - På Drift", "5 - Turnén", "6 - Bortom månen och Mars, "Dylan" * Nina Kinert "Pets & friends"
- Freddie Wadling "Jag är monstret", "The dark flower"
- Graveyard "Innocence and Decadence"
- Kristofer Åström "Zinkadus"
- Daniel Lemma "Dreamers and Fools"
- Anders Widmark "Carmen"
- Pugh Rogefeldt "Maraton"
- Svante Thuresson "Vi som älskar och slåss"
- Selfish "Wanting you would be"

== Arranger ==
- Tonbruket "The Enders", "Enter the Amazonas" (album)
- Ane Brun "Last Breath", "Sonet 138", "Trust", "Undertow Orchestra version" (live)
- Freddie wadling "Jag är monstret" (album)
- Ebbot Lundgren with the Swedish Radio Orchestra
- Anna Ternheim “Lovers Dream Naked” version with the Swedish Radio Orchestra
- Rebecka Törnqvist “Melting into orange, The cherry blossom” albums
- Edda Magnason with Norrbotten Big Band
- Svante Thuresson “Vi som älskar och slåss” (album)

== Sources ==
- Sandberg, Patrik (27 February 2021). "De kosmopolitiska låtarna återspeglar Lindströms mångsidiga musiksmak. Han rör sig flytande utan skyddsnät över stilistiska gränser." OrkesterJournalen (in Swedish) Archived from the original on 28 February 2021. Retrieved 8 April 2021. https://orkesterjournalen.com/johan-lindstrom-septett-on-the-asylum/
- Cederskog, Georg (29 Mars 2021). "Skivorna jag köpte på rea blev min utbildning" Dagens Nyheter (in Swedish). Archived from the original on 30 Mars 2021. Retrieved 8 April 2021. https://www.dn.se/kultur/johan-lindstrom-skivorna-jag-kopte-pa-rea-blev-min-utbildning/
- Oscarsson, Kjell (16 July 2019) "Johan Lindström Septett - mångsidigt och nyfiket" SverigesRadio (in Swedish). Archived from the original on 16 July 2019. Retrieved 8 April 2021. https://sverigesradio.se/avsnitt/1323949
- Kungliga Dramatiska Teatern. https://www.dramaten.se/medverkande/skadespelare/Lindstrom-Johan/
