= Rigmor Gustafsson =

Swedish jazz singer

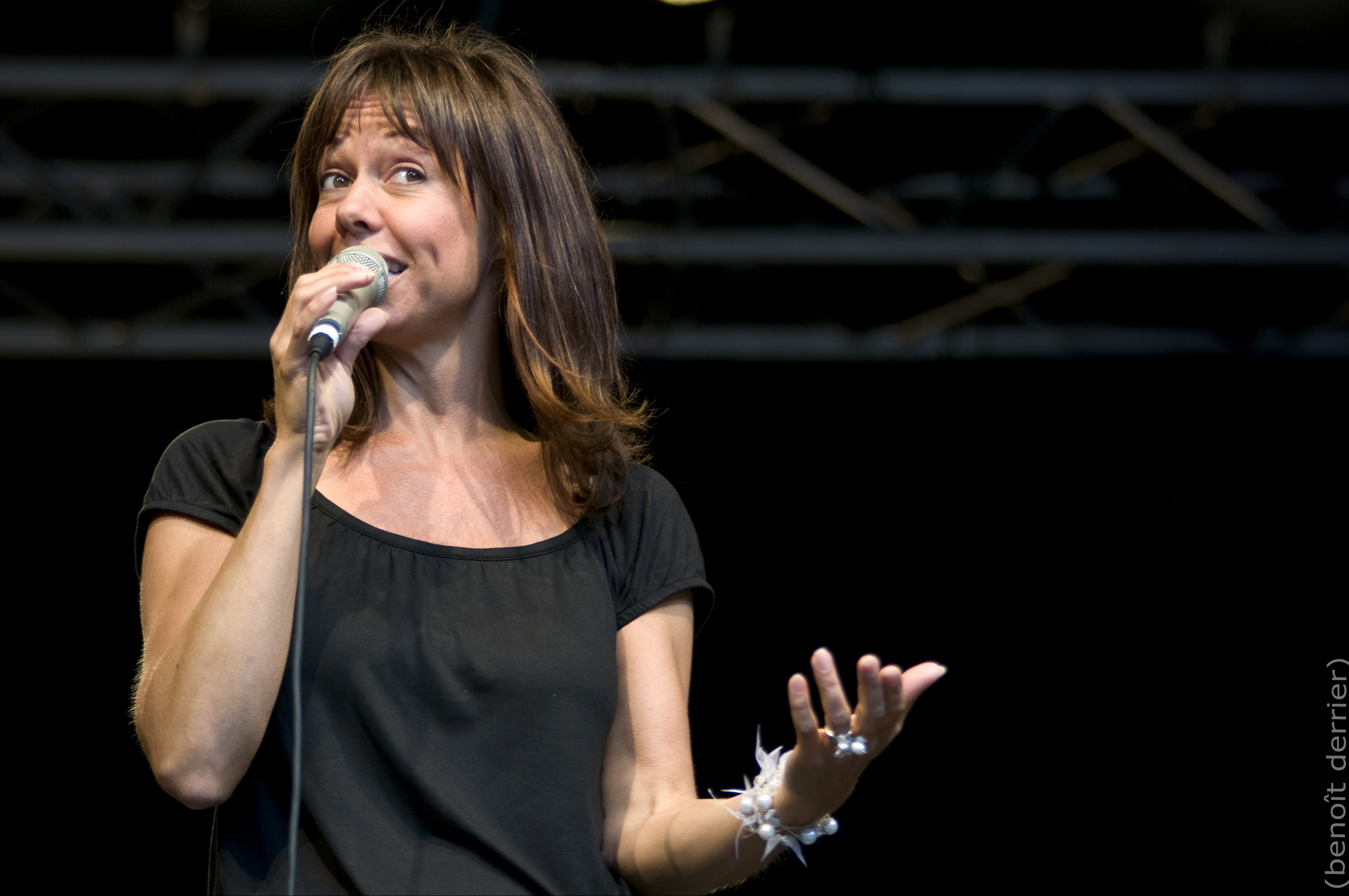
- Rigmor Gustafsson (2009)

Background information
- Born: Rigmor Elisabeth Gustafsson; April 12, 1966 (age 59); Värmskog, Sweden
- Genres: Jazz
- Occupation: Singer
- Labels: ACT
- Website: {{URL|example.com|optional display text}}

Rigmor Elisabeth Gustafsson (born 12 April 1966) is a Swedish jazz singer.

Gustafsson comes from a musical family. Her sister Christina is also a singer in the field of jazz. At the age of eight she learned how to play the guitar at the public school in Grums, Sweden. She studied at Sundstagymnasiet in Karlstad where she studied classical guitar but moved to singing. She began to study at the New School for Jazz and Contemporary Music in New York City and at Mannes College of Music. While living in New York she met other musicians and started the Rigmor Gustafsson Quintet. She graduated in 1995, and the quintet went on tour in Sweden, Germany, and Switzerland between 1996 and 1997.

In 1996, Rigmor Gustafsson's debut album In the Light of Day was released but in 1994 one could listen to Gustafssons children's record Sånger från TV-serien Planeten Pi where she sings with Anders Lundin and Lars In de Betou.

In 2003, she signed with the German record label ACT, which released I Will Wait for You, recorded with the trombonist Nils Landgren. During the same year Gustafsson performed at the Nobel Banquet. In 2004, the album Close to You was released in which she recorded a version of Dionne Warwick's songs written by Burt Bacharach. The album achieved gold status. On the album On My Way to You, from 2006, she sings songs by French composer Michel Legrand.

On 19 June 2007, Gustafsson participated in the radio show Sommar, which was broadcast on Sveriges Radio P3. The same year the music album Alone with You was released.

== Discography ==
- Sanger Fran TV-programmen Var Och Varannans Varld Och Planeten Pi (Philips, 1994)
- Live (Prophone, 2000)
- I Will Wait for You with Nils Landgren (ACT, 2003)
- Close to You with Jacky Terrasson (ACT, 2004)
- On My Way to You (ACT, 2006)
- Alone with You (ACT, 2007)
- Jazz Divas of Scandinavia with DR Big Band (Red Dot, 2009)
- Calling You (ACT, 2010)
- When You Make Me Smile (ACT, 2014)
- Come Home (ACT, 2019)
