= Żaklin Nastić =

German politician (born 1980)

Żaklin Nastić MdB
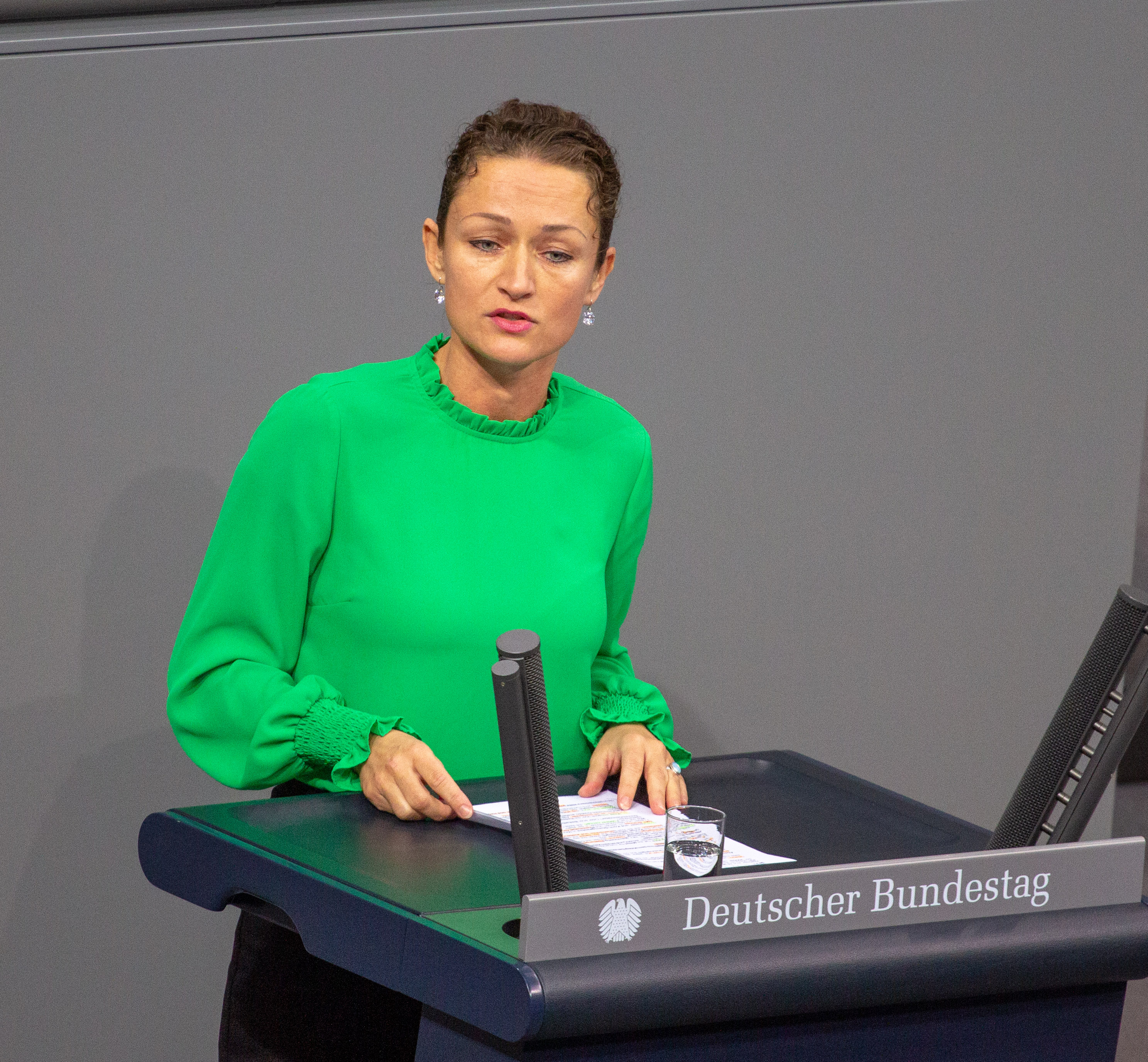
- Nastić in 2019

Member of the Bundestag for Hamburg
- In office 24 October 2017 – 23 February 2025
- Constituency: The Left list

Member of the Hamburg Parliament
- In office 1 August 2017 – 23 October 2017
- Preceded by: Inge Hannemann
- Succeeded by: Carola Ensslen
- Constituency: The Left list

Personal details
- Born: Żaklin Jadwiga Sarah Grinholc; 29 January 1980 (age 46) Gdynia, Polish People's Republic
- Citizenship: Germany; Poland
- Party: BSW (2023–present)
- Other political affiliations: The Left (2008–2023)

Żaklin Nastić (born Żaklin Jadwiga Sarah Grinholc; born 29 January 1980) is a Polish-German politician who was elected for The Left. In October 2023 she switched to BSW, but left the party in 2026. She served as a member of the Bundestag from 2017 to 2025.

== Life ==
Żaklin Nastić came to Hamburg in 1990 and lived for a time in refugee shelters in the Port of Hamburg. In 2000, she passed her A levels in Hamburg at the Geschwister-Scholl-Schule and later studied Slavic studies. She became member of the Bundestag after the 2017 German federal election. While in school, she worked various jobs to support her and her mother who worked as a cleaner. In 1998, Nastić voted for the first time. She has stated her interest for politics started when she studied the civil and secession wars in Yugoslavia.

According to her statements, her family has Polish, German, Kashubian and Jewish roots. Nastić still has Polish citizenship in addition to German citizenship. She lives in Hamburg and, according to her own statements, has been divorced since 2022 and has two children.

On 21 March 2023, she published her book "Aus die Maus. Der Blick von unten auf die da oben" in which she critically discusses contemporary politics.

She rejects military support for Ukraine and spoke at a "No more weapons to Ukraine" rally in Berlin on 27 January 2023.

== Politics and party ==
Żaklin Nastić with Gabriele Krone-Schmalz and Sahra Wagenknecht (Berlin, 2023) Nastić joined the Left Party in 2008. In 2011, she won a mandate in the Eimsbüttel district assembly and was a member until 2017. From 2016 to September 2022, she was her party's state spokesperson (equivalent to the state chair) in Hamburg.

In 2017, she succeeded Inge Hannemann, who resigned for health reasons, in the Hamburg Parliament. In the 2017 german federal election, she received 10.4% of the vote as a direct candidate in the Hamburg-Eimsbüttel constituency. Since she won a mandate in the federal election via the state list, she resigned her mandate in the Hamburg Parliament.

Nastić has been a member of the national executive of the Left Party since 2018 and was re-elected as the state spokesperson for the Left Party in Hamburg in October 2020.

In the 19th German Bundestag, Nastić was a full Committee on Human Rights and Humanitarian Aid member and the human rights spokesperson for the Left Party faction. She is a deputy member of the Committee on Internal Affairs and Community, as well as the Subcommittee on the United Nations, International Organisations and Globalisation. She is deputy chair of the German-Polish and German-Southeastern European parliamentary groups.

In the 20th German Bundestag, the Left Party faction again appointed her as spokesperson for human rights; she is also an authorised representative on the Defence Committee.

In June 2023, Nastić accused her party members Christoph Timann, his deputy and another person of entering her office without permission and also mentioned the possibility of her documents having been searched. She stated she was pressing charges, which was not confirmed by police. The Left Party in Hamburg then pressed criminal charges against her for defamation and libel.

In October 2023, when the Association BSW – Für Vernunft und Gerechtigkeit (BSW – For Reason and Justice) was founded, Nastić resigned from the Left Party along with nine other members of the Bundestag. In January 2024, she became a member of the newly founded BSW party, which emerged from the association. Nastić is building the Wagenknecht party in Hamburg.

In October 2024, Correctiv reported on the employment of Andreja Lovic as Nastić's employee. The latter, a ‘Serbian-German nationalist’, had, among other things, attended a conference by Alexander Dugin. Nastić had deleted the name of her employee from her website after a request from Correctiv and stated that his employment would end at the end of October 2024. However, she did not comment on the background when asked.

In January 2025, BSW announced that Nastić would be taking a break and was not running as lead candidate for the 2025 election. On 23 February, she was announced as the lead candidate of the BSW campaign, citing miscommunication regarding the January statements.
