= Museum St. Ingbert =

Coordinates: 49°16′44″N 7°06′45″E

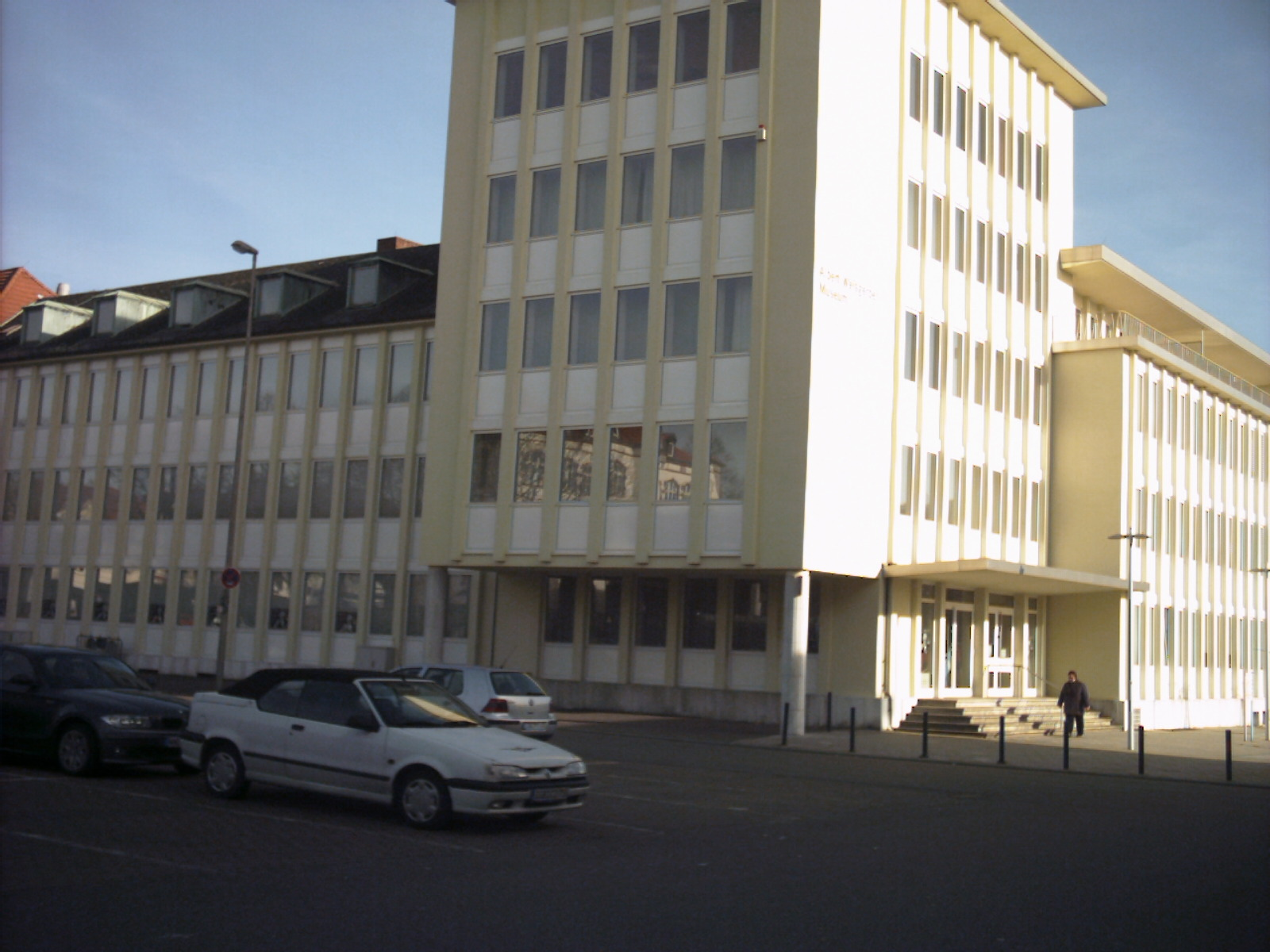
Former St. Ingbert Museum

Museum St. Ingbert is a former art museum in St. Ingbert, Saarland, Germany.
