= Hartz concept =

Social program in Germany

The Hartz concept (German: Hartz-Konzept), also known as Hartz reforms or the Hartz plan, is a set of recommendations submitted by a committee on reforms to the German labour market in 2002. Named after the head of the committee, Peter Hartz, these recommendations went on to become part of the German government's Agenda 2010 series of reforms, known as Hartz I – Hartz IV. The committee devised thirteen "innovation modules", which recommended changes to the German labour market system. These were then gradually put into practice: The measures of Hartz I – III were undertaken between 1 January 2003, and 2004, while Hartz IV was implemented on 1 January 2005.

The "Hartz Committee" was founded on 22 February 2002, by the federal government of Germany led then by Gerhard Schröder. Its official name was Kommission für moderne Dienstleistungen am Arbeitsmarkt (Committee for Modern Services in the Labour Market). The 15-member committee was chaired by Peter Hartz, then Volkswagen's personnel director.

In 2023, the Hartz concept was replaced by the Citizens' Basic Income (Bürgergeld).

== Hartz I, II, and III ==
Hartz I and II both came into effect on 1 January 2003, aiming at making new types of jobs easier to create, and covered, for example:

=== Hartz I ===
- The foundation of "Staff Services agencies" (Personal-Service-Agenturen or PSAs).
- Support for vocational further education from the German Federal Labour Agency.
- Subsistence payments by the Federal Labour Agency.

=== Hartz II ===
- New types of employment, Mini job and Midi job, with lower or gradually rising taxes and insurance payments.
- A grant for entrepreneurs, known as the "Ich-AG" (Me, Inc.).
- Introduction of Jobcenters, local government facilities for providing public employment services

=== Hartz III ===
- Hartz III came into effect on 1 January 2004. This measure was aimed at restructuring and reforming the federal public employment services agency, whose name was changed from the Bundesanstalt für Arbeit or Arbeitsamt (Federal Labour Institution), to the Bundesagentur für Arbeit or Agentur für Arbeit (Federal Labour Agency).

== Hartz IV ==
The fourth stage of the reform was voted in by the Bundestag on 16 December 2003, and by the Bundesrat on 9 July 2004, to take effect by 1 January 2005.

This part of the reforms brought together the former unemployment benefits for long-term unemployed ('Arbeitslosenhilfe') and the welfare benefits ('Sozialhilfe'), leaving them both at approximately the lower level of the former Sozialhilfe (social assistance). The level for a single person was €374 per month (known as the Regelsatz). This has risen since, reaching €563 per month in 2024. Added to this is the financial assistance with housing and health care. Couples can receive benefits for each partner plus their children.

Prior to 2005, between 12 and 36 months (depending upon the claimant's age and work history) of their full unemployment benefit (60 to 67% of the previous net salary) were followed by the Arbeitslosenhilfe (unemployment assistance), amounting to 53 to 57% of the last net salary. Since 2008, eligibility for the full unemployment benefit (renamed Arbeitslosengeld in 2005 and commonly referred to as Arbeitslosengeld I in everyday German to contrast it with the lower benefits discussed below) has been restricted to 12 months in general, 15 months for those aged 50 or older, 18 months for those 55 or older and 24 months for those 58 or older.

This is now followed by the (usually much lower) Arbeitslosengeld II (Hartz IV) benefits if the claimant meets eligibility requirements.

Whether or not a claimant is eligible for Arbeitslosengeld II depends on his or her savings, life insurance and the income of spouse or partner. If these assets are below a threshold level, a claimant can get money from the state. The threshold level in July 2008 was €150 for free assets (at least €3,100) and €250 for fixed retirement assets, both calculated per capita and lifetime year. Additionally, every employable individual in a communal household (persons living in and depending on the resources of the claimant), can have one car worth about €7,500 and a self-used house of 130 square meters living space (more if there are other people in the common household).

To receive payments, a claimant must agree to a contract subject to public law. This contract outlines what they are obliged to do to improve their job situation, and when the state is obliged to help. An unemployed person may be required to accept any kind of legal job. This compulsion is restricted by constitutional rights, like freedom of movement, freedom of family, marriage and human dignity. If taking on a specific placement is deemed reasonable by the responsible agency, not applying will result in a reduction or even complete suspension of the appropriate payment.

Within the Arbeitslosengeld II schemes, the state covers the health insurance of the unemployed. Until the end of 2010, payments towards the pension scheme of the claimant were also made.

It is possible to earn income from a job and receive Arbeitslosengeld II benefits at the same time. Job income is debited from Arbeitslosengeld II payments according to a formula that leaves a certain amount of the additional revenue untouched. These revenues are: a certain amount of savings (which increases with age); €100 plus 20 percent of the wage up to €800 plus 10% of the wage up to €1200 (up to €1500 if there are children). Through this mechanism Arbeitslosengeld II can be regarded as a sort of minimum wage floor for employees without assets, where the minimum wage is not fully paid by the employer but assured by the state. There are criticisms that this defies competition and leads to a downward spiral in wages and the loss of full-time jobs.

The Hartz IV reform merged the federal level unemployment agency with the local level welfare administration. This facilitated a better, case-oriented approach to helping unemployed people find work and improve their situations. The plan's objective is to reduce caseloads from 400 unemployed persons per agent to not more than 75 (aged 25 or less), or not more than 150 persons over the age of 25. For difficult cases, dedicated case managers may be deployed. Legally, however, the agencies remain separate.

The Hartz IV reforms continue to attract criticism in Germany, despite a considerable reduction in short- and long-term unemployment. This reduction has led to some claims of success for the Hartz reforms. Others say the actual unemployment figures are not comparable because many people work part-time or are not included in the statistics for other reasons, such as the number of children that live in Hartz IV households, which has risen to record numbers.

About 7 million people get Hartz IV benefits, of which 2.2 million are unemployed. The budget is estimated to be €20 billion per year.

In April 2018, 55% of the recipients had a migration background. According to the Federal Employment Agency (German: Bundesagentur für Arbeit) this was due to the migrants lacking either employable skills or knowledge of the language.

In a November 2019 ruling the Federal Constitutional Court prohibited controversial harsh sanctions against benefit recipients. It outlawed complete payment cuts and decided that 30-percent cuts would only be permissible under specific conditions, as such punishments endangered jobseekers' minimum standard of living.

== Successor ==
In November 2022, the Bundestag decided to replace Hartz IV with the so-called Bürgergeld on 1 January 2023, which reduces conditionalities and increases the standard unemployment benefit (Regelsatz) of ALG II to a monthly 503 euros. It was one of the main projects of the social democrat, green, and liberal coalition under Olaf Scholz.

== Cultural impact ==
Although the official term for long-term unemployment benefits is still Arbeitslosengeld II, most Germans, even news programmes and politicians in parliament, refer to it as Hartz IV. The term was voted German Word of the Year 2004 by the Society for the German Language. Earlier, in 2002, the term Ich-AG (another Hartz measure, see above) had been chosen as the German Un-Word of the Year by a jury of linguistic scholars. In 2010, a solitary activist pretending to be a movement, Bewegung Morgenlicht threatened and executed attacks in protest against government policy symbolized by Hartz IV.

Meanwhile, Hartz IV has become a synonym for the class of non-working poor and is used as a prefix in multiple contexts (e.g. low-brow daytime television programmes are called "Hartz IV TV" by critics).

== See also ==
- Monday demonstrations, 2004
- Working opportunities with additional expenses compensation
- Arbeitslosengeld II – Leistungen zum Lebensunterhalt, the German social services and unemployment software-system
- Universal Credit
- Inge Hannemann
- Unemployment benefits
