= Saarländisches Karnevalsmuseum =

Carnival museum in St. Ingbert, Saarland, Germany

Coordinates: 49.2823°N 7.1221°E

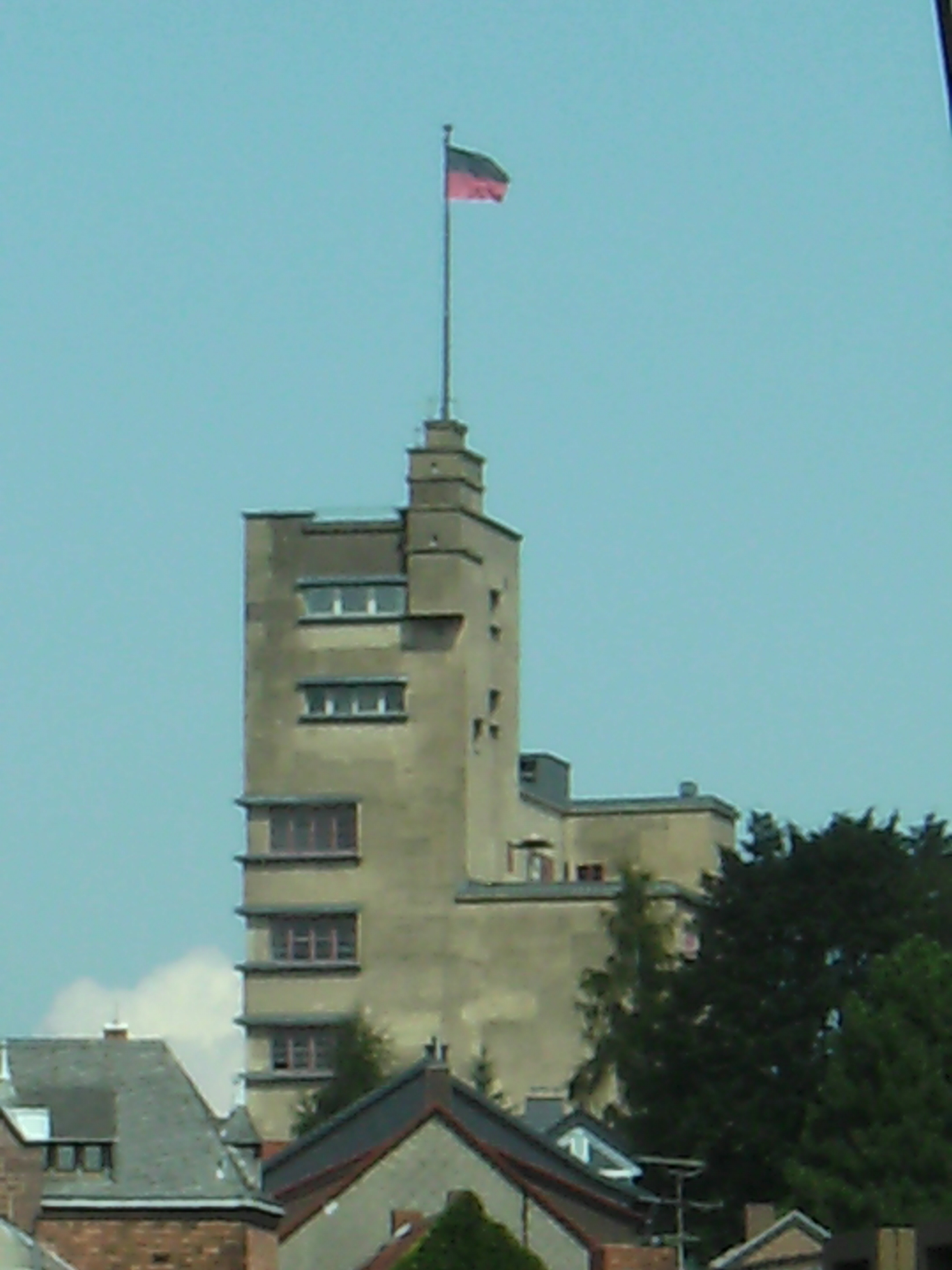
Becker tower

The Saarländisches Fastnachtsmuseum (English: Saarland Carnival Museum) was founded in 1979 and since 1995 located in St. Ingbert, Saarpfalz (Saar-Palatinate) district in the south-east part of the Saarland, Germany. Since 2002, the museum was in the Becker tower of the former Becker brewery (Kaiserstraße 176, Sankt Ingbert), which later became part of the Karlsberg Brewery.

The Mardi Gras Museum was founded by the Association of Saarland Carnival Clubs (Verband Saarländischer Karnevalsvereine "VSK"). In over 300 m^{2}, the association displayed a large number of carnival exhibits. Medals, costumes, commemorative lively speeches and much more were presented. Due to the critical financial situation, the museum was closed in 2013.
