= Protests against Hartz IV reforms =

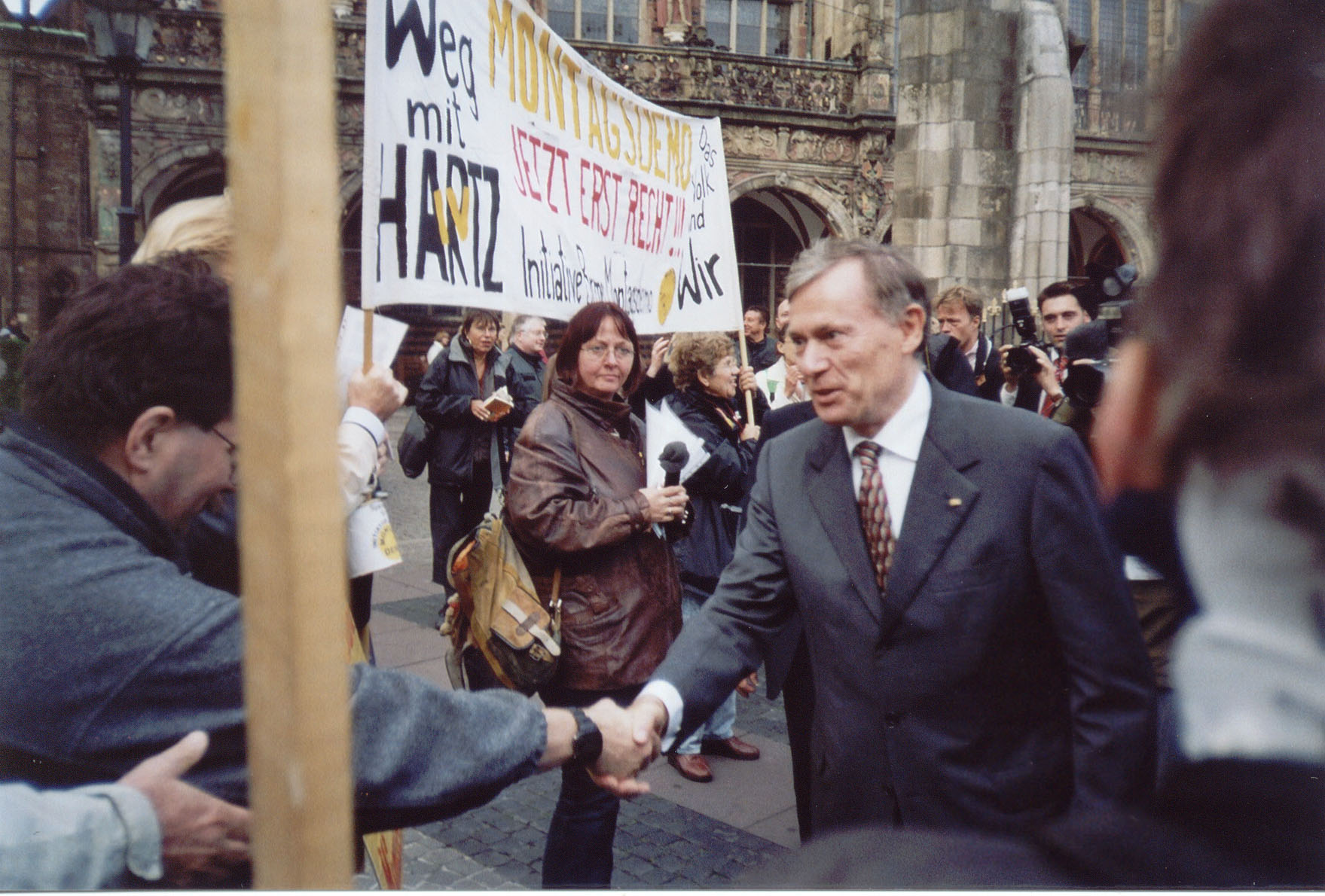
Monday demonstrators in Bremen welcome federal president Horst Koehler (10 September 2007).

The Protests against Hartz IV reforms in Germany were aimed at the 2004 Hartz IV reform, which provide significant cutbacks in social welfare benefits for long-term (over 12 months) unemployed persons.

The demonstrations started on 2 August, when about 10,000 people took part. In two weeks, over 100,000 people marched in over 100 German cities and towns, mostly in Eastern Germany (the former GDR). In September, unemployment reached 10.5% of the workforce nationwide, while peaking at 18.2% in Eastern Germany; participation usually mirrored the level of unemployment in the respective area. In 2005, fewer demonstrations took place - only every second Monday of the month. Neo-fascists started using the agitation of workless people for their propaganda.

The demonstrations were arranged and named the Monday demonstrations in an analogy with the 1989/1990 Monday demonstrations in East Germany. Some considered this adaption to be political abuse, pointing out that these reforms are a "necessary evil" to deal with a crisis in the welfare system, and regard it as inadequate that protests for democracy are turned into protests for more social benefits. The supporters of the rallies denounce this criticism as an attempt to stifle the protests of the affected people.

== See also ==
- Agenda 2010 of the German government
- Monday demonstrations in East Germany
