= Working opportunities with additional expenses compensation =

Labor market policy measure in Germany

German Working opportunities with additional cost compensation are set in § 16 Abs. 3 SGB II (Social Code, Book II). These working opportunities are features of the social welfare (§ 19 BSHG: "charitable additional work").

== Aim and conditions ==
As part of the German Hartz concept to increase employment and to decrease welfare costs, the aim of these working opportunities is to aid the long term unemployed in becoming accustomed to regular work again and thus increase their chances of securing paid employment.

In accordance with this aim there are four main conditions. First, the working opportunity is subordinate to other opportunities like recruitment into paid work or subsided work. Second, it has to be proportional. Third, the command to take the working opportunity has to be reasonably certain. According to the German constitution every administrative law which interferes with basic civil rights has to state clearly and exhaustively what the citizen has to do. In this case this is the extent, mode and duration of the working opportunity. Fourth, and last, occupational health and safety have to be maintained.

== Additional Cost Compensation ==
The additional cost compensation jobs are often called pejoratively Ein-Euro-Job (One Euro jobs) by some because the "additional cost compensation" is about one Euro per hour. It can differ from 1.00 € to 2.50 €. The compensation is not considered a wage, so it is not taken from the unemployment benefit. Nothing is added to the pension calculation like regular working jobs - the pension is calculated by the mean earning. This means that the more people there are working with additional cost compensation the lower the average pension. Furthermore, this means less money to spend for pensions; but, in Germany, welfare pays towards the pension of everyone who is on welfare and able to work.

== Statistics ==
People with working opportunities with additional cost compensation are not unemployed in federal statistic meanings, even though they are reported unemployed at the Bundesagentur für Arbeit. This is to embellish the unemployment statistic; meaning that people who are forced into these working opportunities with additional cost compensation are not added in official statistic. For example, Germany has about 3,400,000 unemployed people but 5,200,000 that depend on welfare money.

== See also ==
- Workfare
- Welfare to work
- Work for the Dole
