= Internationales Jazzfestival Sankt Ingbert =

Jazz music festival

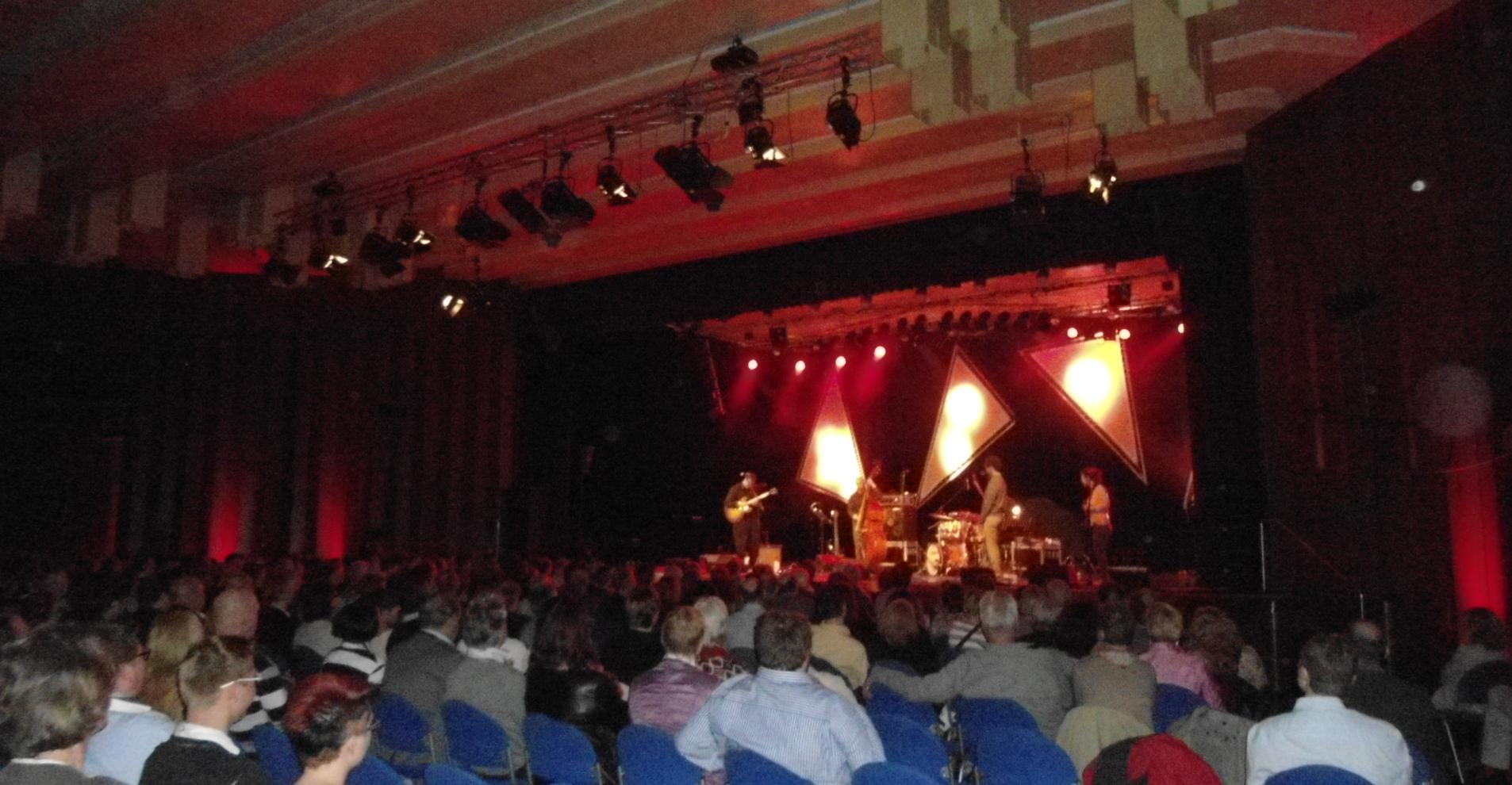
Jazzfestival St. Ingbert

Internationales Jazzfestival Sankt Ingbert is a jazz festival in Sankt Ingbert, Germany, happening yearly since 1987. Many famous musicians have appeared there, including Al Di Meola, Maceo Parker, Archie Shepp, Ginger Baker, World Saxophone Quartet, John Lurie, Mory Kanté, Nils Landgren and many more.

The first years it took place at the Kinowerkstatt, a little cinema. Later (1989), it moved to the Stadthalle because of the growing audience.
