= Sozialgeld =

Sozialgeld (social benefit) to § 28 SGB II was a special performance of the German welfare system, which the social assistance (HLU) from the Twelfth Book of the Social substituted for vulnerable persons

- are not of working age and
- 3 SGB II leben und live with able bodied people who qualify for benefits under SGB II, in a "unit" within the meaning of § 7 para 3 SGB II (such as a family)
- if they are not entitled to basic protection under § 41 SGB XII.

In addition, not employable, minor children of eligible students are entitled to the EED to the social benefit.

On 1 January 2023 Sozialgeld was replaced by Bürgergeld ( Act of (in German) Abs. 1 Satz 2 SGB II).
