= Christian Rach =

German chef and author (born 1957)

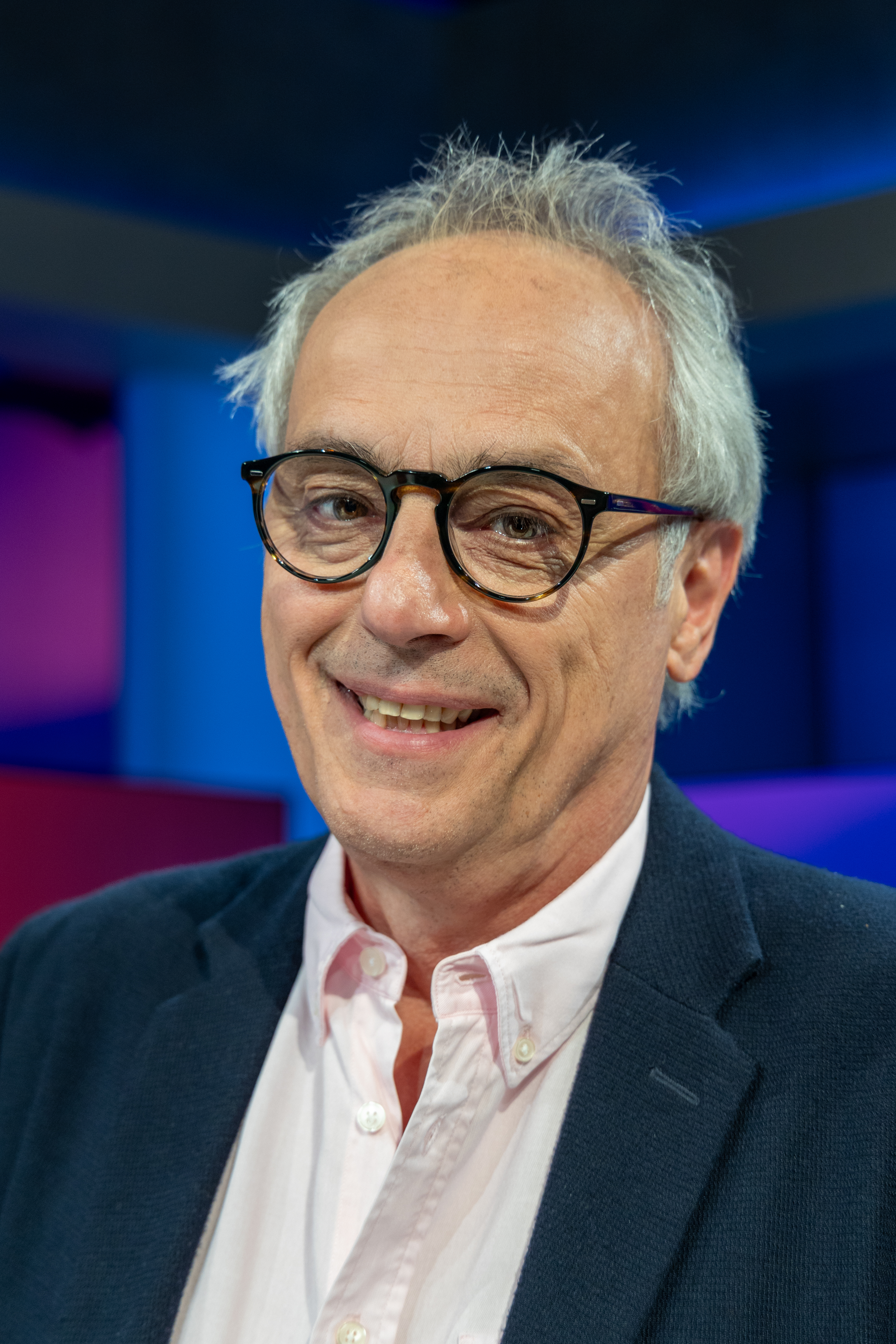
Rach in 2025

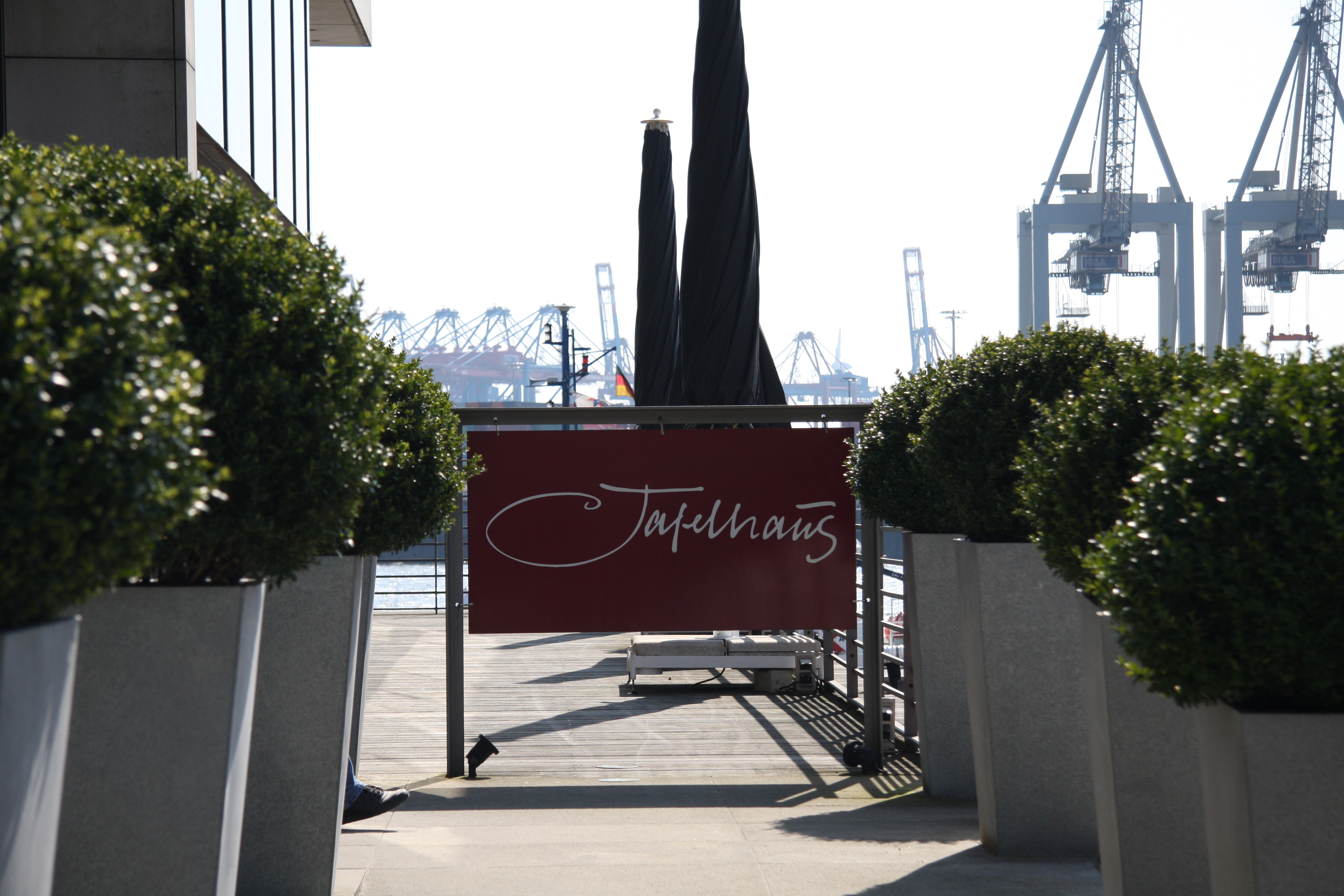
The Entrance to Rach's Michelin star-rated restaurant Tafelhaus

Christian Rach (born 6 June 1957 in St. Ingbert, Saarland) is a German chef and author. He became nationally known through TV as a restaurant tester.

== Life ==
Rach grew up in St. Ingbert, his father was an electrical engineer, his mother a housewife. After graduating from high school, he studied philosophy and mathematics at the University of Hamburg from 1978 to 1983. During his studies, Christian Rach initially worked as a waiter, but soon discovered his passion for cooking and from then on financed his studies as a cook, for example in 1982 and 1983 at the Strandhof with Uwe Witzke. He left university shortly before graduating without a degree, because at the time he had wanted to take the opportunity to work in a French restaurant. So from 1983 he worked first with Philippe Boissou in Grenoble and then in 1984 as a sous' chef at Korso in Vienna, where he gained insights into creative, classical cuisine.

Back in Hamburg, he opened the inner-city restaurant Leopold in 1986 and, together with Robert Wullkopf, the Tafelhaus near Altona harbour in Hamburg in 1989 in a former truckers' pub. The Tafelhaus in an old cemetery house in the Hamburg district of Ottensen has received a Michelin star and other awards every year since 1991. From 2001, the Cantina Milano, which was attached to the Tafelhaus, was also run by Christian Rach. The Tafelhaus has been closed since 30 September 2011.

Rach also ran the Engel restaurant in Hamburg with the Luzifer snack bar from 1997 to November 2007, bringing both to their current prominence. In 2001, he opened Darling Harbour, which, however, had to close in 2004 because, according to Rach's own assessment, the modern concept, among other things, was not accepted.

In 2009, he and a partner took over the gourmet restaurant Das kleine Rote in Hamburg-Bahrenfeld, changing the concept to a "luxury steakhouse" called Rach & Ritchy, which closed in 2019.

Christian Rach is an honorary ambassador for the Children's Hospice of Central Germany and is committed to helping terminally ill children and their families. In collaboration with WWF Germany, Christian Rach campaigns against food waste.

Rach lives in Hamburg-Othmarschen.

== TV ==
Rach takes part in numerous TV shows and had his own TV show as a restaurant tester.

== Awards and publications ==
He has received numerous television and media awards and published several cookbooks.
