= Peter Hartz =

German businessman (born 1941)

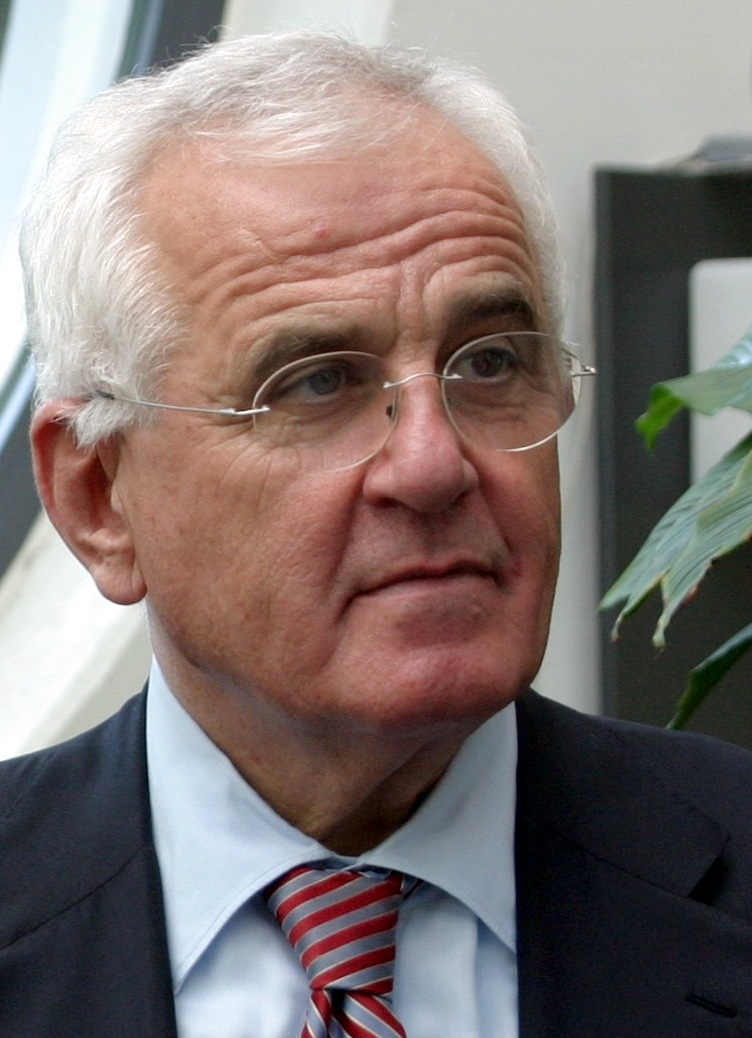
Hartz in 2005

Peter Hartz (born 9 August 1941 in Sankt Ingbert) is a German businessman. He was the human resources executive at Volkswagen AG (VW). Hartz became notable as adviser to German chancellor and former Prime Minister of Lower Saxony, Gerhard Schröder, with whom Hartz developed the so-called Hartz-reforms of the German labour market and job agencies.

== Resignation ==
On 8 July 2005, Hartz offered his resignation (which was accepted a few days later) amidst allegations of wrongdoings in his area of responsibility at Volkswagen, which include :

1. kickbacks to Volkswagen managers from bogus companies doing real estate business with Volkswagen, especially at the Czech subsidiary Škoda Auto;
2. favours to members of the works council (Betriebsrat), which are illegal under German law (the chairman of the VW works council, Klaus Volkert, had resigned 30 June 2005).
3. The contracting of prostitutes at the company's expense, sometimes in company-owned apartments and under the influence of Viagra, which had been prescribed by the company's medical service.

== Conviction ==
Following a deal with the prosecution, Hartz confessed to the charges, and on 25 January 2007, he was convicted to a prison term of 2 years, but set free on probation, and to a fine of €576,000.
