= Bewegung Morgenlicht =

Bewegung Morgenlicht (Dawn Movement or Morning Light Movement) was a German militant, pretending to be a group, active in 2009–10. He carried out a number of arson attacks on banks. He released statements calling for compensation for people who lost money after being sold Lehman Brothers securities just before Lehman Brothers collapsed and a thorough reform of the economy.

In January 2010 he claimed responsibility for sending Roland Koch a fake pipe bomb stating that the action was in response to comments by Koch that beneficiaries of Hartz IV should be put under greater pressure to work.

In February 2010, Thomas R. was arrested in Frankfurt. On 20 October, he was sentenced to four years and ten months of imprisonment.
