= List of Stolpersteine in St. Ingbert =

There are 41 Stolpersteine laid in the streets of Sankt Ingbert, Germany, as part of the Stolpersteine art project by Gunter Demnig. They commemorate the victims of Nazism who lived and worked in the city, and were installed from 2014 to 2018.

== History ==
The first eight Stolpersteine were laid on August 19, 2014. On April 20, 2015, eleven more stones followed. On June 25, 2016, sixteen more Stolpersteine were put in place. On October 29, 2018, six more Stolpersteine were installed.

== List of Stolpersteine ==
Address	Date of installation	Name(s)	Inscription	Picture	Notes
Albert-Weisgerber-Allee 26; 49.27300°N 7.11511°E	October 29, 2018	Änne Meier	Hier wohnte Änne Meier; Jg. 1896; Im Widerstand; Verhaftet 21. 2. 1942; Ravensbrück; Todesmarsch; Geflohen 28. 4. 1945; Befreit	Stolperstein für Erna Kahn	
Dammstraße 7; 49.27694°N 7.12005°E	June 25, 2016	Klara Vicktor	Hier wohnte Klara Vicktor; Geb. Samuel; Jg. 1876; Flucht 1936; USA	Stolpersteine für Familie Vicktor	
Dammstraße 7; 49.27694°N 7.12005°E	June 25, 2016	Kornelia Vicktor	Hier wohnte Kornelia Vicktor; Jg. 1901; Flucht 1936; USA	Stolpersteine für Familie Vicktor	
Dammstraße 7; 49.27694°N 7.12005°E	June 25, 2016	Karl Vicktor	Hier wohnte Karl Vicktor; Jg. 1906; Flucht 1936; USA	Stolpersteine für Familie Vicktor	
Dammstraße 7; 49.27694°N 7.12005°E	June 25, 2016	Hilde Vicktor	Hier wohnte Hilde Vicktor; Geb. Kern; Jg. 1909; Flucht 1936; USA	Stolpersteine für Familie Vicktor	
Dammstraße 7; 49.27694°N 7.12005°E	June 25, 2016	Ilse Vicktor	Hier wohnte Ilse Vicktor; Jg. 1909; Flucht 1936; USA	Stolpersteine für Familie Vicktor	
Dammstraße 7; 49.27694°N 7.12005°E	June 25, 2016	Erich Vicktor	Hier wohnte Erich Vicktor; Jg. 1914; Flucht 1936; USA	Stolpersteine für Familie Vicktor	
Dammstraße 7; 49.27694°N 7.12005°E	June 25, 2016	Ruth Vicktor	Hier wohnte Ruth Vicktor; Jg. 1934; Flucht 1936; USA	Stolpersteine für Familie Vicktor	
Ensheimer Straße 10; 49.27565°N 7.11563°E	October 29, 2018	Bronia Singer	Hier wohnte Bronia Singer; Jg. 1911; Flucht 1938; Italien; 1939 Frankreich mit Hilfe überlebt	Stolpersteine für Familie Singer	
Ensheimer Straße 10; 49.27565°N 7.11563°E	October 29, 2018	Kalman-Lazar Singer	Hier wohnte Kalman-Lazar Singer; Jg. 1882 `Polenaktion` 1938; Ghetto Przemysl; Ermordet 1941	Stolpersteine für Familie Singer	
Ensheimer Straße 10; 49.27565°N 7.11563°E	October 29, 2018	Charlotte Singer	Hier wohnte Charlotte Singer; Jg. 1921; Verhaftet 28. 10. 1938; Von Gestapo; Schicksal unbekannt	Stolpersteine für Familie Singer	
Ensheimer Straße 33; 49.27225°N 7.11141°E	April 20, 2015	Johannes Hoffmann	Hier wohnte Johannes Hoffmann; Jg. 1890; Im Widerstand/Zentrum; Flucht 1935; Frankreich, Luxemburg; 1939 Frankreich; Versteckt gelebt 1941 Brasilien	Stolperstein für Johannes Hoffmann	Johannes Hoffmann lived here with his family from 1934 to 1935.
Ensheimer Straße 35; 49.27202°N 7.11123°E	April 20, 2015	Eva Heimann	Hier wohnte Eva Heimann geb. Ochs; Jg. 1914; Flucht Holland; Interniert Westerbork; Deportiert 1944; Theresienstadt; Ermordet in Auschwitz	Stolpersteine für Eva Heimann und Erich Ochs	
Ensheimer Straße 35; 49.27202°N 7.11123°E	April 20, 2015	Erich Ochs	Hier wohnte Erich Ochs; Jg. 1920; Flucht 1937 Holland; 1939 Belgien; Interniert Drancy; Deportiert 1943; Ermordet in Majdanek	Stolpersteine für Eva Heimann und Erich Ochs	
Kaiserstraße 37; 49.27824°N 7.11554°E	April 20, 2015	Helene Stern	Hier wohnte Helene Stern geb. Roos; Jg. 1893; Flucht 1935; Luxemburg; Frankreich; 1936 USA	Stolpersteine für Helene und Jakob Stern	
Kaiserstraße 37; 49.27824°N 7.11554°E	April 20, 2015	Jakob Stern	Hier wohnte Jakob Stern; Jg. 1892; Flucht 1935; Luxemburg; Frankreich; 1936 USA	Stolpersteine für Helene und Jakob Stern	
Kaiserstraße 45; 49.27844°N 7.11581°E	June 25, 2016	Moritz Schmidt	Hier wohnte Moritz Schmidt; Jg. 1872; Flucht 1934; Schweiz; Tot 23.5.1943; Baden	Stolpersteine für Moritz und Therese Schmidt	
Kaiserstraße 45; 49.27844°N 7.11581°E	June 25, 2016	Therese Schmidt	Hier wohnte Therese Schmidt; Geb. Meyer; Jg. 1873; Flucht 1934; Schweiz	Stolpersteine für Moritz und Therese Schmidt	
Kaiserstraße 53; 49.27202°N 7.11123°E	April 20, 2015	Artur Wolfermann	Hier wohnte Artur Wolfermann; Jg. 1896; Flucht 1935 Luxemburg; Interniert Drancy; Deportiert 1942; Auschwitz; Ermordet 1942	Stolpersteine für Wolfermann und Friedberg	
Kaiserstraße 53; 49.27202°N 7.11123°E	April 20, 2015	Erna Wolfermann	Hier wohnte Erna Wolfermann; Geb. Friedberg; Jg. 1900; Flucht 1935 Luxemburg; Interniert Drancy; Deportiert 1942; Auschwitz; Ermordet 1942	Stolpersteine für Wolfermann und Friedberg	
Kaiserstraße 53; 49.27202°N 7.11123°E	April 20, 2015	Edith Hedwig Wolfermann	Hier wohnte Edith Hedwig Wolfermann; Jg. 1929; Flucht 1935 Luxemburg; Interniert Drancy; Deportiert 1942; Auschwitz; Ermordet 1942	Stolpersteine für Wolfermann und Friedberg	
Kaiserstraße 53; 49.27202°N 7.11123°E	April 20, 2015	Edgar Friedberg	Hier wohnte Edgar Friedberg; Jg. 1902; Flucht 1936; Frankreich mit Hilfe; Befreit / Überlebt	Stolpersteine für Wolfermann und Friedberg	
Kaiserstraße 75; 49.28007°N 7.11767°E	June 25, 2016	Emma Rieser	Hier wohnte Emma Rieser geb. Strauss; Jg. 1875; Flucht 1938; Luxemburg; 1941 Kuba; 1942 USA	Stolpersteine für Emma und Adolf Rieser	
Kaiserstraße 75; 49.28007°N 7.11767°E	June 25, 2016	Adolf Rieser	Hier wohnte Adolf Rieser; Jg. 1872; Flucht 1938; Luxemburg; 1941 Kuba; 1942 USA	Stolpersteine für Emma und Adolf Rieser	
Kaiserstraße 104; 49.27982°N 7.117942°E	August 19, 2014	Erna Kahn	Hier wohnte Erna Kahn; Geb. Baum; Jg. 1886 deportiert 1940; Gurs; Flucht 1942; Marokko / USA	Stolperstein für Erna Kahn	
Kaiserstraße 104; 49.27982°N 7.117942°E	June 25, 2016	Josefine Haber	Hier wohnte Josefine Haber geb. Lyon; Jg. 1860; Flucht 1939 Holland; Interniert Westerbork; Deportiert 1943; Sobibor; Ermordet 14.5.1943	Stolpersteine für Josefine Haber und Michael Lyon	
Kaiserstraße 104; 49.27982°N 7.117942°E	June 25, 2016	Michael Lyon	Hier wohnte Michael Lyon; Jg. 1858; Deportiert 1942; Theresienstadt; Ermordet 31.12.1942	Stolpersteine für Josefine Haber und Michael Lyon	
Kaiserstraße 136; 49.28127°N 7.11927°E	August 19, 2014	Paul Kahn	Hier wohnte Paul Kahn; Jg. 1872; Verhaftet 1942; Sachsenhausen; Ermordet 27. 2. 1942	Stolpersteine für Klara und Paul Kahn	
Kaiserstraße 136; 49.28127°N 7.11927°E	August 19, 2014	Klara Kahn	Hier wohnte Klara Kahn; Jg. 1907; Flucht; USA	Stolpersteine für Klara und Paul Kahn	
Poststraße 5; 49.27976°N 7.11595°E	June 25, 2016	Käthe Meyer	Hier wohnte Käthe Meyer; Jg. 1904; Flucht 1935; Schweiz; 1936 Italien; 1939 Kuba	Stolpersteine für Käthe und Erich Meyer	
Poststraße 5; 49.27976°N 7.11595°E	June 25, 2016	Erich Meyer	Hier wohnte Dr. Erich Meyer; Jg. 1890; Flucht 1935; Schweiz; 1936 Italien; 1939 Kuba	Stolpersteine für Käthe und Erich Meyer	
Richard-Wagner-Straße 39; 49.28443°N 7.10405°E	October 29, 2018	Johanna Henn	Hier wohnte Johanna Henn; Jg. 1897; Eingewiesen 2.5.1942; Heilanstalt; Klingenmünster; Ermordet 5. 5. 1944	Stolperstein für Johanna Henn	
Rickertstraße 23; 49.27934°N 7.11341°E	April 20, 2015	Otto Beer	Hier wohnte Otto Beer; Jg. 1892; Flucht 1935; Frankreich; 1937 USA	Stolpersteine für Lucy Karoline und Otto Beer	Translation: Here lived Otto Beer; Born 1892; Escape in 1935; France; 1937 USA
Rickertstraße 23; 49.27934°N 7.11341°E	April 20, 2015	Lucy Karoline Beer	Hier wohnte Lucy Karoline Beer; Geb. Homburger; Jg. 1898; Flucht 1935; Frankreich; 1937 USA	Stolpersteine für Lucy Karoline und Otto Beer	Translation: Here lived Lucy Karoline Beer; Born 1898; Escape in 1935; France; 1937 USA
Sebastianstraße 12; 49.26906°N 7.16376°E	June 25, 2016	Adolf Lambertz	Hier wohnte Adolf Lambertz; Jg. 1879; Schutzhaft 1938; Dachau; Entlassen 1938	Stolperstein für Adolf Lambertz	
Spieser Landstraße 2; 49.28618°N 7.12787°E	August 19, 2014	Jakob Ammann	Hier wohnte Jakob Ammann; Jg. 1901; Verhaftet 13. 8. 1936; Oranienburg; 1940 Dachau; Ermordet 1944	Stolperstein für Jakob Ammann	
Wiesenstraße 44; 49.27153°N 7.11767°E	October 29, 2018	Jakob Kennerknecht	Hier wohnte Jakob Kennerknecht; Jg. 1895; Im Widerstand/SPD; Verhaftet; Zwangsarbeit 1938; Westwall- und Bergbau; 1944 Arbeitslager Ebensee; Befreit	Stolperstein für Jakob Kennerknecht	
Wittemannstraße 5; 49.27565°N 7.11563°E	August 19, 2014	Bruno Löb	Hier wohnte Bruno Löb; Jg. 1899; Flucht 1935 Belgien; Interniert Mechelen; Deportiert 1943; Auschwitz; Ermordet 1943	Stolpersteine für Familie Löb	
Wittemannstraße 5; 49.27565°N 7.11563°E	August 19, 2014	Herta Löb	Hier wohnte Herta Löb; Geb. Salomon; Jg. 1901; Flucht 1935 Belgien; Interniert Mechelen; Deportiert 1943; Auschwitz; Ermordet 1943	Stolpersteine für Familie Löb	
Wittemannstraße 5; 49.27565°N 7.11563°E	August 19, 2014	Ruth Löb	Hier wohnte Ruth Löb; Jg. 1925; Flucht 1935 Belgien; Interniert Mechelen; Deportiert 1942; Auschwitz; Ermordet 1. 9. 1942	Stolpersteine für Familie Löb	
Wittemannstraße 5; 49.27565°N 7.11563°E	August 19, 2014	Inge Löb	Hier wohnte Inge Löb; Jg. 1932; Flucht 1935 Belgien; Interniert Mechelen; Deportiert 1943; Auschwitz; Ermordet 1943	Stolpersteine für Familie Löb	
