= Albert Weisgerber =

German painter

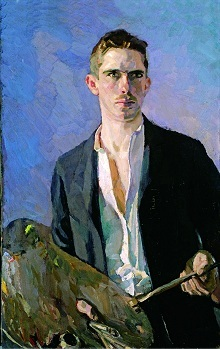
Self-portrait, 1908

Albert Weisgerber (21 April 1878 – 10 May 1915) was a German painter whose work forms a bridge between Impressionism and early Expressionism.

== Biography ==
He was born in Sankt Ingbert. From 1897 to 1901 he studied at the Munich Art Academy under Franz von Stuck. He became friends with artists Hans Purrmann, Paul Klee, Wassily Kandinsky, Max Slevogt, and Karl Arnold.

In 1898, he set up his own artists' group, Sturmfackel, with his friend Alfred Kubin. He earned his living making illustrations for the magazine Jugend.

In 1904 he was very active in the Munich café scene, where he met Margaret Pohl, who was also a painter and the daughter of a successful Jewish banker in Prague. They married in 1907.

In 1913 he became founding president of the artists' collective; Münchner Neue Secession, with members such as Alexej von Jawlensky, Paul Klee and Alexander Kanoldt.

According to the RKD, he is known today for his cartoons and illustrations as well as his paintings. He was close friends with Theodor Heuss, who later became the first president of the Federal Republic of Germany in 1949. Heuss' young face can often be found within Weisgerber's paintings.

He joined the German army in World War I and was promoted to the rank of major before being shot and killed on 10 May 1915 in the Battle of Fromelles, west of Rijsel. In the months before his death, Weisgerber was Commanding Officer of the 1st Company of RIR 16 - the List Regiment. Weisgerber was only 37 years old. His body was initially buried in Fournes-en-Weppes, then exhumed and reburied in Nordfriedhof cemetery in Munich.

== Selected paintings ==
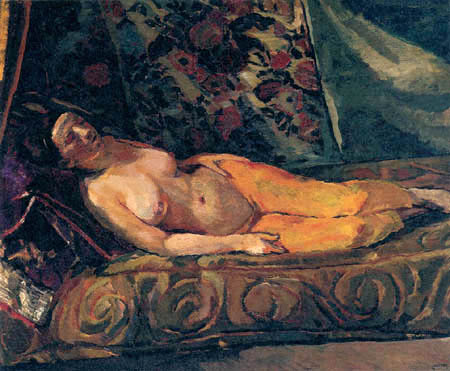
Half-nude in Yellow Pants

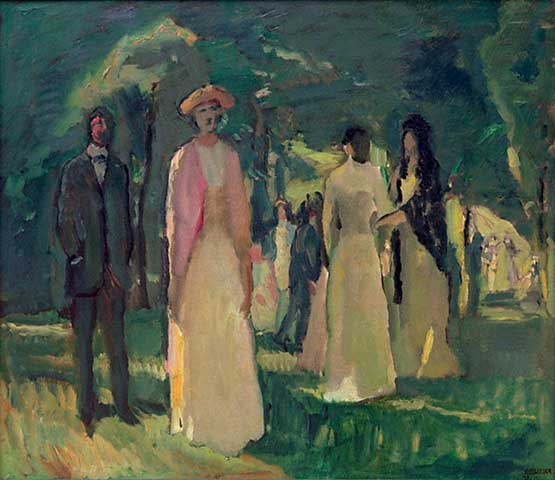
Garden Party

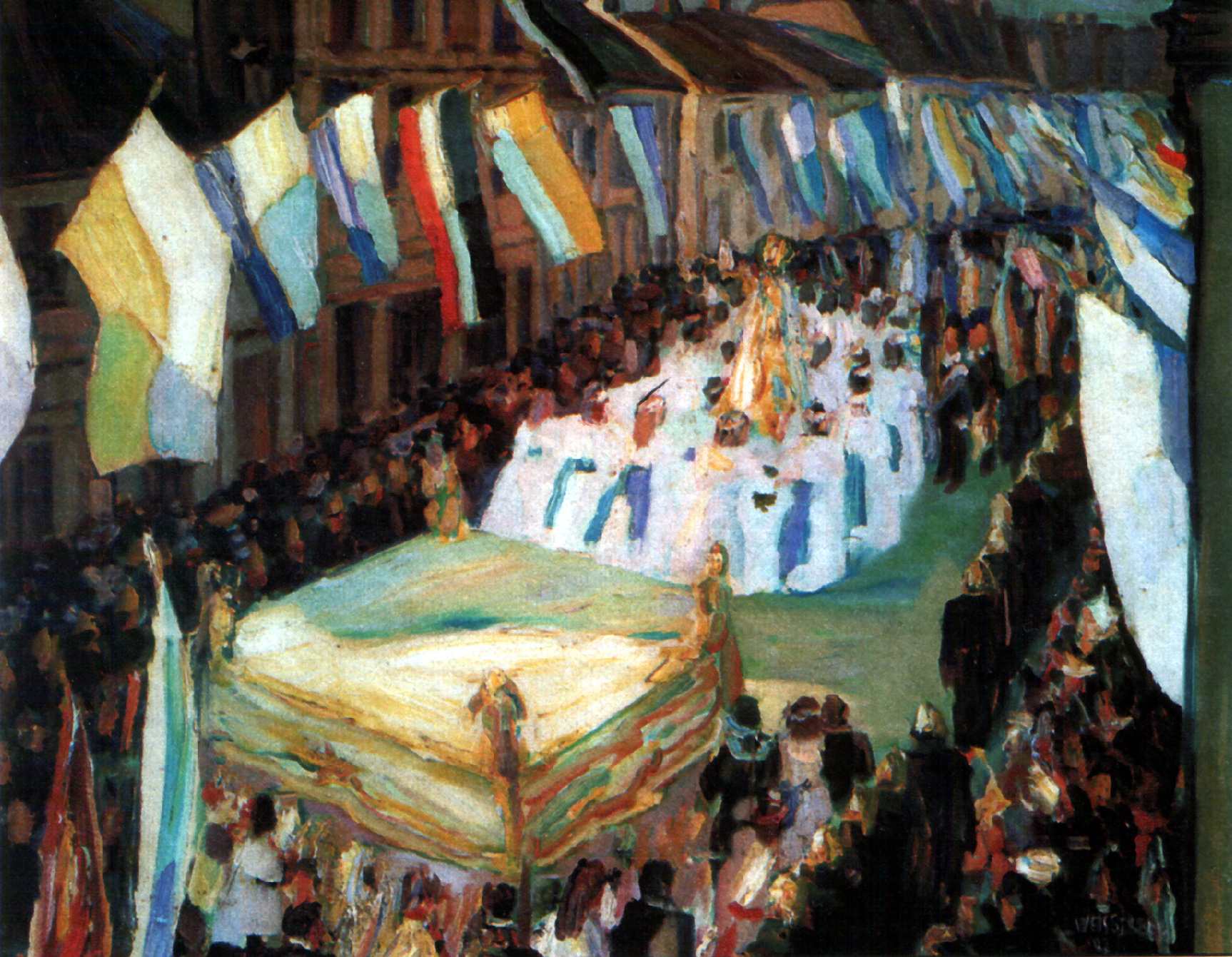
Procession in Sankt Ingbert

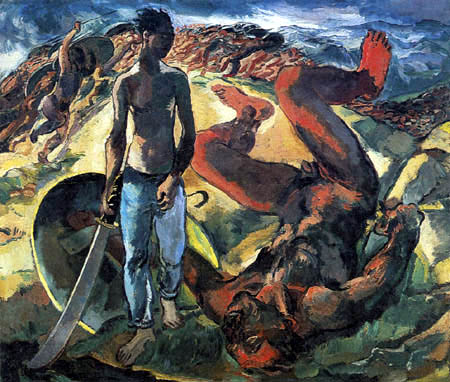
David and Goliath

== Sources ==
- Weber, Thomas (2011). Hitler's First War: Adolf Hitler, the Men of the List Regiment, and the First World War. OUP Oxford. ISBN 9780199226382.
