= Bürgergeld =

Unemployment security benefit in Germany

The Bürgergeld (German: [ˈbʏɐ̯ɡɐɡɛlt], lit. 'citizens' money') was Germany's unemployment benefits system from 1 January 2023 to 1 July 2026. The Bürgergeld was developed by Olaf Scholz's coalition government and ratified by Germany's two chambers in November 2022.

Compared to its predecessor Arbeitslosengeld II commonly known as Hartz IV, it had a higher unemployment grant (Regelsatz), with adult jobseekers living alone receiving a default sum of €502 per month plus standard rates for rent and energy, compared to the previous €449. In 2024, it was increased to €563. The introduction of Bürgergeld also increased the amount of personal savings that beneficiaries could hold without a part of their unemployment grant being deducted. A single adult was capable of owning up to €40,000. Bürgergeld also replaced the Sozialgeld, a benefit for people who cannot work.

== History ==
The predecessor to Bürgergeld was Hartz IV, introduced on 1 January 2005 by the Second Schröder cabinet, a coalition of the German Social Democrats and Greens. The actual benefit received was adjusted several times. In 2011, the grand coalition between Social Democratis and Christian Democrats reformed Hartz IV.

Hartz IV monthly grant for adults living alone (Regelsatz) and Bürgergeld over time

In 2022, labour minister Hubertus Heil (Social Democratic Party) developed the Bürgergeld proposal for the ruling traffic light coalition. After the coalition passed their proposal in Germany's lower chamber (Bundestag), the opposition Christian Democrats (CDU/CSU) used their consent law veto in the upper chamber (Bundesrat). This led to negotiations and a Bundesrat-Bundestag compromise reached via the Mediation committee procedure.

Overview of the reform
Feature	Hartz IV (2022)	Bürgergeld government proposal	Bürgergeld government-CDU/CSU compromise
Agreed by	Second Merkel government, last reform in 2011	Scholz coalition (blocked by CDU in Bundesrat)	Scholz coalition and the opposition CDU/CSU
Standard monthly unemployment payment (Regelsatz), single adult	€449, adjusted annually	€502, adjusted annually	€502, adjusted annually
Grace period without sanctions	-	6 months without sanctions	-
Mild sanctions period	-	24 months	12 months
Personal savings allowed (Schonvermögen), single adult	€3,100, or €150 multiplied by the recipient's age, whichever is higher. (e.g. €9,000 for a 60-year old jobseeker)	€60,000	€40,000

In October 2024, the German public health insurance organizations blamed the government for a sharp rise in premiums, since the monthly €119 paid by the government for each of the 5,6 million recipients of Bürgergeld to the organisations were insufficient to cover the cost. They stated that the rest of the insurance pool members had to cover for the €9.2 billion in annual losses by paying higher premiums.

Starting in January 2025, beneficiaries who violated the terms of eligibility might have their monthly benefit reduced by up to 30% for 1-3 months. In July 2025, the window for assessing assets in savings was reduced from 12 months to 6 months. In other words, applicants for benefits were assessed by a Jobcenter after 6 months, and if their savings exceeded the maximum threshold, they had to use their personal funds before state support could be approved.

As of July 2025, the Merz cabinet suggested to replace the existing Bürgergeld with a basic social security (Grundsicherung). The proposed changes would reduce the benefit amounts, as well as the number of people eligible. The new legislation would be focused on incentivizing the unemployed to return to the workforce, for example, by sanctioning recipients who miss job center appointments. Welfare reform was specifically included in the current coalition agreement, with policy slated to change in 2026. However, members of the coalition, including the SPD (Social Democratic Party), have presented heavy opposition to proposed cuts, arguing that it will only hurt the most vulnerable. Currently, the Bürgergeld has statutory protections from having its benefit reduced. However, The Federal Finance Ministry froze increases of the benefit, and said that this would continue into 2026. Transforming Bürgergeld to Grundsicherung was characterized not as a change of system but as a mere upgrade.

== Goal ==
The basic idea behind Bürgergeld was to bring unemployed people into the workforce. In June 2024, the number of Bürgergeld recipients had risen for the second year to some 5.5 million people. Four million of those were theoretically able to work, while 1.5 million were deemed unfit for work. While 17% of people in Germany were not German citizens at that time, 47% of the people receiving Bürgergeld belonged to that group. The statistics did not record whether someone with a German passport originally came to Germany as a migrant or a refugee. About one quarter of the 47% non-Germans came from Ukraine, Syria, Turkey and Afghanistan. The Focus magazine commented, that industry was desperately looking for workers, while government made it more attractive for non-Germans in Germany to stay unemployed. The nonprofit organization Correctiv commented on the Bürgergeld for migrants in 2023 and pointed out that German law initially requires asylum seekers to stay in the state they were allocated under a refugee-sharing agreement, which may hinder them from finding work, especially if in a state with high shares of unemployment.

== Reception and evaluation ==
The Bürgergeld reform was initially interpreted in political and academic circles as an effort to address perceived punitive elements of the Hartz IV system and to realign Germany's welfare state towards a model emphasizing dignity and social inclusion. The reform aimed to balance support and individual obligation, promoting long-term integration and reducing stigma for jobseekers.

A 2024 study by the German Institute for Economic Research (DIW) found that many Jobcenter employees expressed concerns, particularly about the increased benefit levels and relaxed sanction rules, which they believed could weaken work incentives. A 2025 assessment by the Bertelsmann Stiftung provided a nuanced view: it noted improvements in trust, qualification support, and administrative accessibility, but also revived debates on performance incentives and the balance between social protection and labor-market responsibility.

Early socioeconomic assessments indicate that the Bürgergeld has improved income security for low-income households by raising benefit levels and stabilizing disposable incomes, particularly for families facing inflationary pressures. Analyses from the Bertelsmann Stiftung report that higher standard rates and expanded support services helped reduce short-term poverty risks and provided more predictable household budgets. Studies from the Bundeszentrale für politische Bildung (bpb) highlight that the reform strengthened basic subsistence protection, although many recipients still remain close to the national poverty line.

At the same time, several more recent assessments adopt a more critical tone and point to structural limitations that persist despite the reform.

Findings from the Paritätischer Gesamtverband indicate that a substantial poverty gap remains, with many households receiving Bürgergeld still several hundred euros below the poverty line and experiencing multiple forms of material deprivation. Research by the Institute for Employment Research (IAB) notes that clear effects on labour-market participation have yet to be demonstrated due to limited evaluation data. These findings have also contributed to a polarized public debate in which some political actors frame the Bürgergeld in populist terms, alleging widespread disincentives to work despite limited evidence, while social organizations warn against portraying recipients as competitors or moral categories.
