= Geschwister-Scholl-Schule (Tübingen) =

Coordinates: 48°32′33″N 9°03′27″E

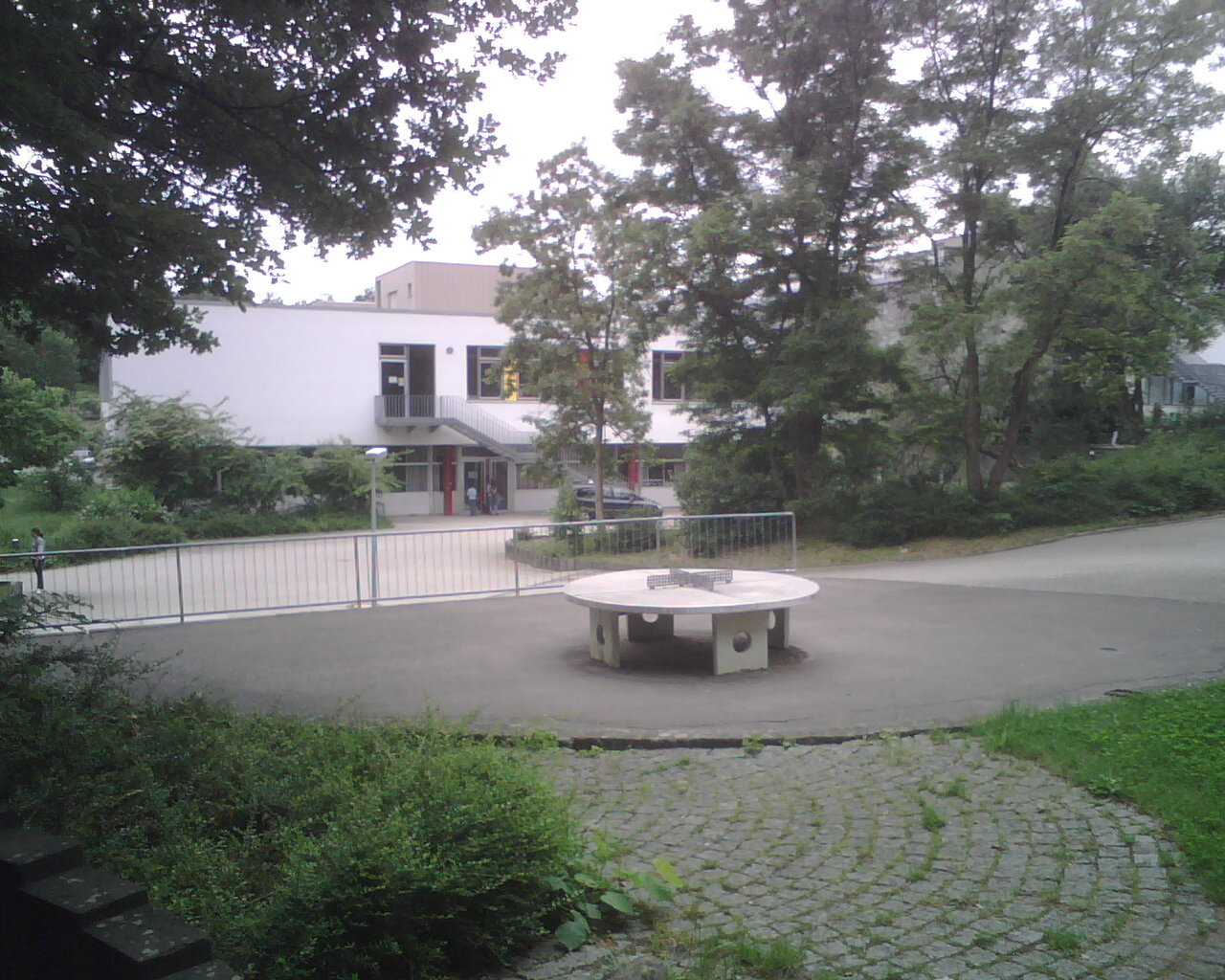
Geschwister Scholl-Schule Tübingen

Geschwister-Scholl-Schule is the largest secondary school in the university town of Tübingen, Baden-Württemberg, Germany. It consists of a Hauptschule, a Realschule, and a Gymnasium.

== History ==
The school was established in 1971 as the Gesamtschule Tübingen.

== Name ==
The name Geschwister-Scholl-Schule literally translates as Scholl Siblings School. Its namesakes are Hans Scholl and his sister Sophie Scholl, who were members of the White Rose, a student group in Nazi Germany who resisted Hitler and National Socialism. The white rose was hence incorporated into the school's logo.

== Gymnasium ==
The Gymnasium at Geschwister-Scholl-Schule is the largest section of the school with 850 students.
