= Sankt Ingbert =

Town in Saarland, Germany

- Town
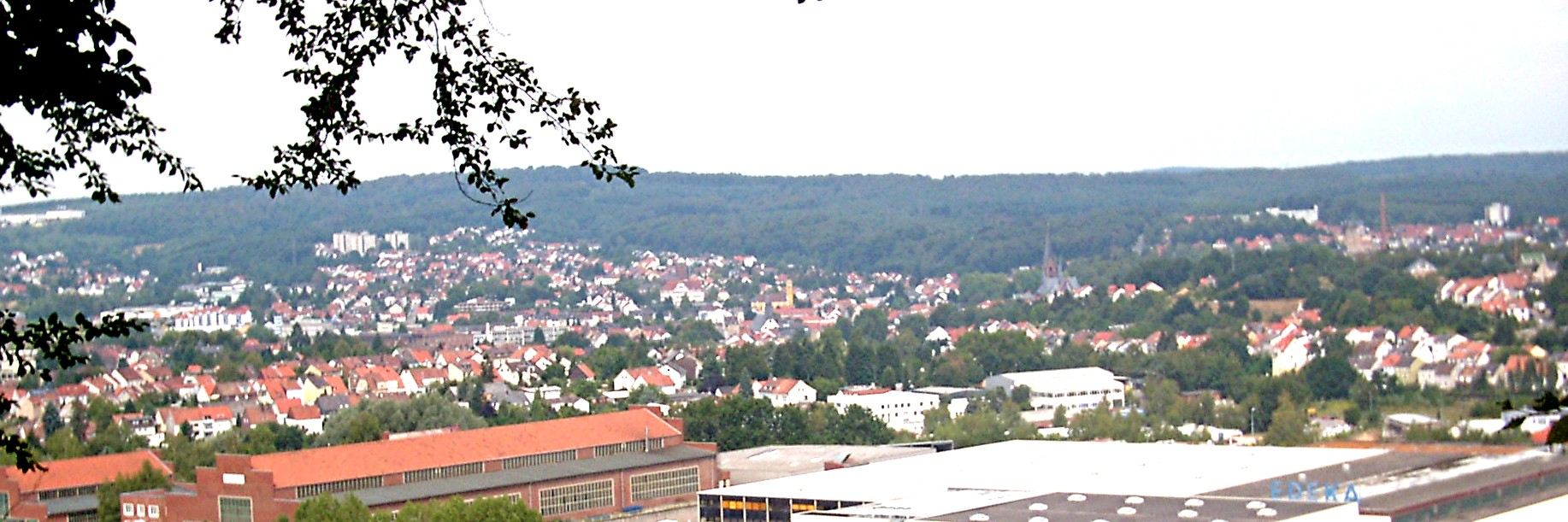
- Panoramic view of St. Ingbert

- Flag Coat of arms

- Location of Sankt Ingbert within Saarpfalz-Kreis district
- Interactive map of Sankt Ingbert
- Location within Germany Location within Saarland
- Coordinates: 49°18′N 7°7′E
- Country: Germany
- State: Saarland
- District: Saarpfalz-Kreis
- Subdivisions: 5

Government
  - Mayor (2019–29): Ulli Meyer (CDU)

Area
  - Total: 49.95 km^{2} (19.29 sq mi)
- Elevation: 215–402 m (705–1,319 ft)

Population (2025-12-31)
  - Total: 35,209
  - Density: 704.9/km^{2} (1,826/sq mi)
- Time zone: UTC+01:00 (CET)
  - Summer (DST): UTC+02:00 (CEST)
- Postal codes: 66386
- Dialling codes: 06894
- Vehicle registration: HOM, IGB
- Website: Official website

St. Ingbert (German pronunciation: [zaŋkt ˈɪŋbɛʁt]; sometimes spelled in full as Sankt Ingbert; Palatine German: Dingmat [ˈdɪŋ.mat] or Dimbat) is a town in the Saarpfalz district in Saarland, Germany with a population of 34,971 (2021). It is situated approximately 10 km north-east of Saarbrücken and 10 km south-west of Neunkirchen.

== History ==
St. Ingbert is named after the Irish Saint St Ingobert and for 300 years belonged to the electorate of Trier.

== Economy ==
Sankt Ingbert is an old industrial town, but most of its heavy industries (coal, steel, glass) have long closed down. Major employers now include the software company SAP SE and Festo automation technologies.

== Transport ==
The town is served by St. Ingbert railway station. St. Ingbert is situated only 10 km away from the Saarbrücken Airport.

== Culture ==
The Saarländisches Karnevalsmuseum exhibited carnival costumes of the Saar region. It was closed in 2013.

The St. Ingberter Pfanne is a well-known cabaret event, which took first place in 1985.

The Federal Festival of Young Film (Bundesfestival junger Film) is one of the largest German-language short film festivals for young filmmakers. It has been held decentrally in St. Ingbert since 2018 and is aimed at filmmakers under the age of 29 with prizes worth 20,000 euros.

The Internationales Jazzfestival Sankt Ingbert took place from 1987 until 2019.

The St. Ingbert Museum gave an overview of the life and work of the St. Ingbert Impressionist Albert Weisgerber on 485 square metres. With more than 70 paintings and many other works, the Albert Weisgerber Foundation owns a large part of his works, which can be classified between German Impressionism and the beginning Expressionism. The museum had an additional area of about 450 square metres, which was intended for temporary exhibitions, as well as other rooms. Initially in municipal hands, the Museum St. Ingbert was transferred to the Albert Weisgerber Foundation, newly established in 1991, whose ideal and financial sponsors were the town of St. Ingbert and the Saarpfalz district. The museum was dissolved in 2007. The Alte Baumwollspinnerei was planned as the new museum, but the opening date was postponed indefinitely.

The St. Ingbert Museum of Local History (Heimatmuseum), which dealt with the town's industrial past, was located in the same building. A permanent exhibition entitled "Kohle - Eisen - Stahl" ("Coal - Iron - Steel") ran from 1991 to 2006. Both museums were housed in the building of the former district administration office of the St. Ingbert district on the market square, which was built in the 1950s in the typical post-war architectural style of the economic miracle years. The local history museum was dissolved in 2006 by order of the administrative leadership.

== Twin towns – sister cities ==
Sankt Ingbert is twinned with:

- Saint-Herblain, France (1981)
- N'Diaganiao, Senegal (1986)
- Radebeul, Germany (1988)
- Rhodt unter Rietburg, Germany (1959) ("Weinpatenschaft")

== Notable people ==
- Anton Betz (1883–1984), journalist and publisher
- Jupp Derwall (1927–2007), football player and manager, died here
- Peter Hartz (born 1941), businessman
- Christian Rach (born 1957), chef and author
- Bernd Schneider (born 1964), racing driver
- Heinz Vollmar (1936–1987), football player
- Albert Weisgerber (1878–1915), painter

== See also ==
- List of Stolpersteine in St. Ingbert
