= Inge Hannemann =

German blogger, whistleblower and politician

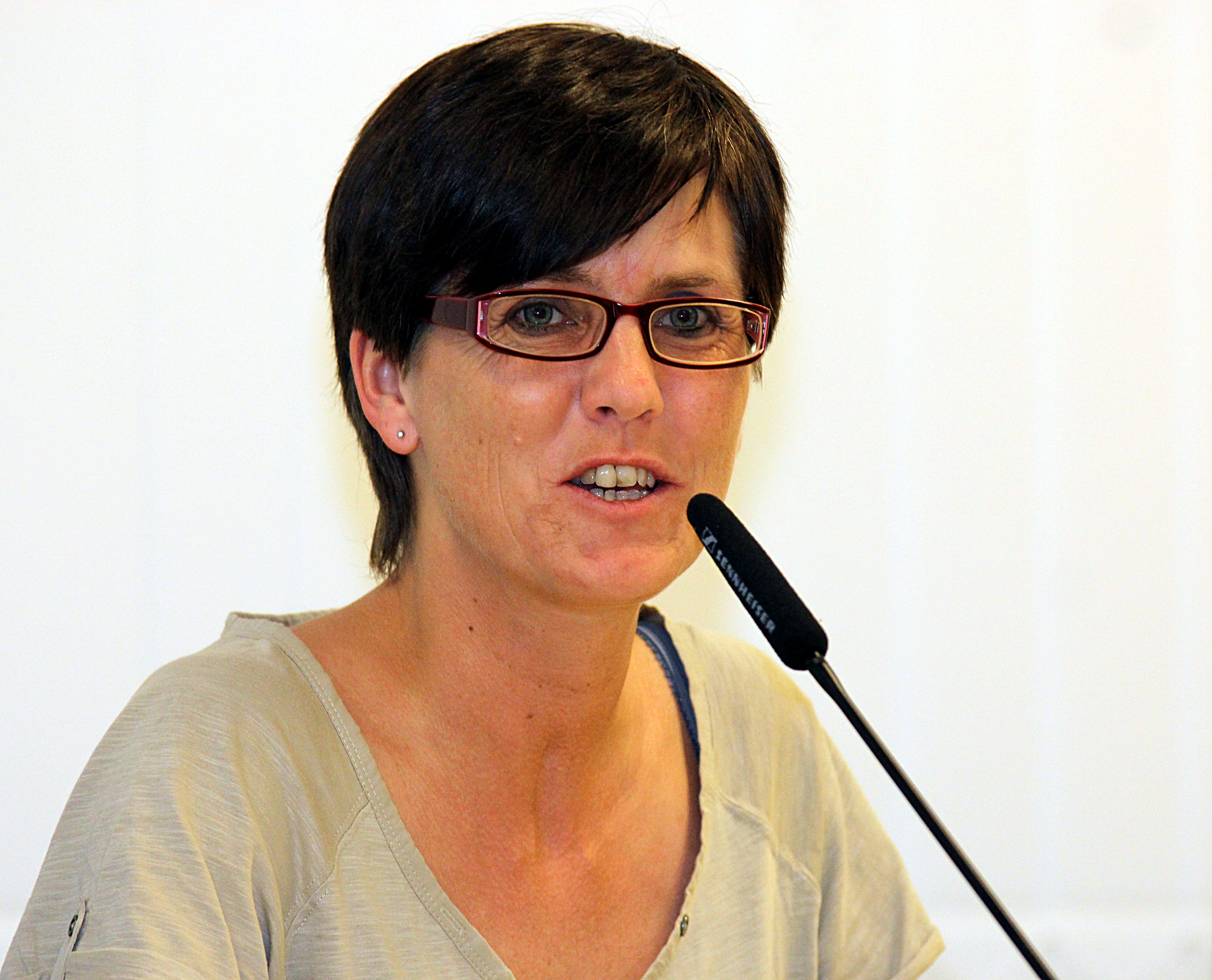
Hannemann in 2013

Inge Hannemann (born 1968) is a German blogger, whistleblower, Hartz IV critic and politician. In February 2015, she was elected to the Hamburg Parliament for the political party Die Linke (The Left).

== Life ==
Born in Hamburg, Hannemann trained as a forwarding merchant, network administrator and job placement counselor. She studied journalism, is a member of the labor union Ver.di, and advocates an unconditional basic income. She is active in local politics in Hamburg. Although she is not a member of the party Die Linke, she was voted to the district assembly Hamburg Altona in May 2014. During the Hamburg parliamentary elections, she ran for Die Linke on place 13 of the party list. With 7,570 direct votes, she won a seat in the 21st Hamburg parliament. In Hamburg parliament she sits on the petitions committee. She is the spokesperson for labor market policy for the parliamentary group of Die Linke. On 10 May 2017, Hannemann announced that she would resign from her seat in the Hamburg Parliament for health reasons, effective 31 July, and would withdraw from politics.

Hannemann is married and has a daughter.

== Controversy on the sanctions practice ==
From 2005, Hannemann worked for the Job Center Hamburg-Altona. According to media articles, she refused to issue sanctions in case of rule violations over several months. Hannemann denies these accusations and claims to have only withdrawn sanctions in individual, justified cases. Whether to issue a sanction or not lies within the discretion of the case worker. Furthermore, Hannemann criticized how case workers at the Job Center deal with recipients of benefits of Hartz IV and applicable guidelines. For these reasons, she was suspended by the Job Center in 2013 and was banned from entering the premises. Hannemann was offered a position in the district office of Eimsbüttel, which she declined. Instead, she sought reinstatement as a job placement counselor at the Job Center. Her emergency appeal was rejected by the labor court on 30 July 2013. The main proceedings were originally scheduled for 11 July 2014 but the court cancelled the day before because the city of Hamburg revoked her assignment to the Job Center in order to employ her in a different position. Hannemann's attempts to reverse the revocation of the secondment were unsuccessful. In December 2014 Hannemann agreed to a settlement and has worked for the integration office since.

Over 16,000 people signed an online-petition demanding that her employer withdraw the disciplinary actions against Hannemann.

Hannemann was the first employee of a German Job Center to publicly criticize the labor market policy of Agenda 2010. She claimed in her Altona-Blog and many presentations and interviews that "support and demand" (Fördern und Fordern) — the proclaimed goal of the Hartz-concept — long since gave way to technocracy. Hartz IV fails to offer a perspective for unemployed people to reenter the labor market, but instead applies sanctions to deny their benefits. During the labor court trial, the Federal Labor Agency declared that the abuse described by Hannemann does not exist and that she was endangering thousands of Job Center employees. Instead, they maintained, she simply chose the wrong job. Hannemann objected and claimed to be able to prove her allegation with documents.

On 20 November 2013, Hannemann's petition "Arbeitslosengeld II – Abschafffung der Sanktionen und Leistungseinschränkungen (SGB II und SGB XII)" (unemployment benefits II – abolishment of the sanctions and benefit restrictions) was published on the petition website of the German Federal Parliament. 50,000 signatures were necessary to reach the quorum. This goal was reached already on 16 December 2013. On 17 March 2014 the petition was dealt with in a public session of the petition committee of the German Federal Parliament.
