= A2LL =

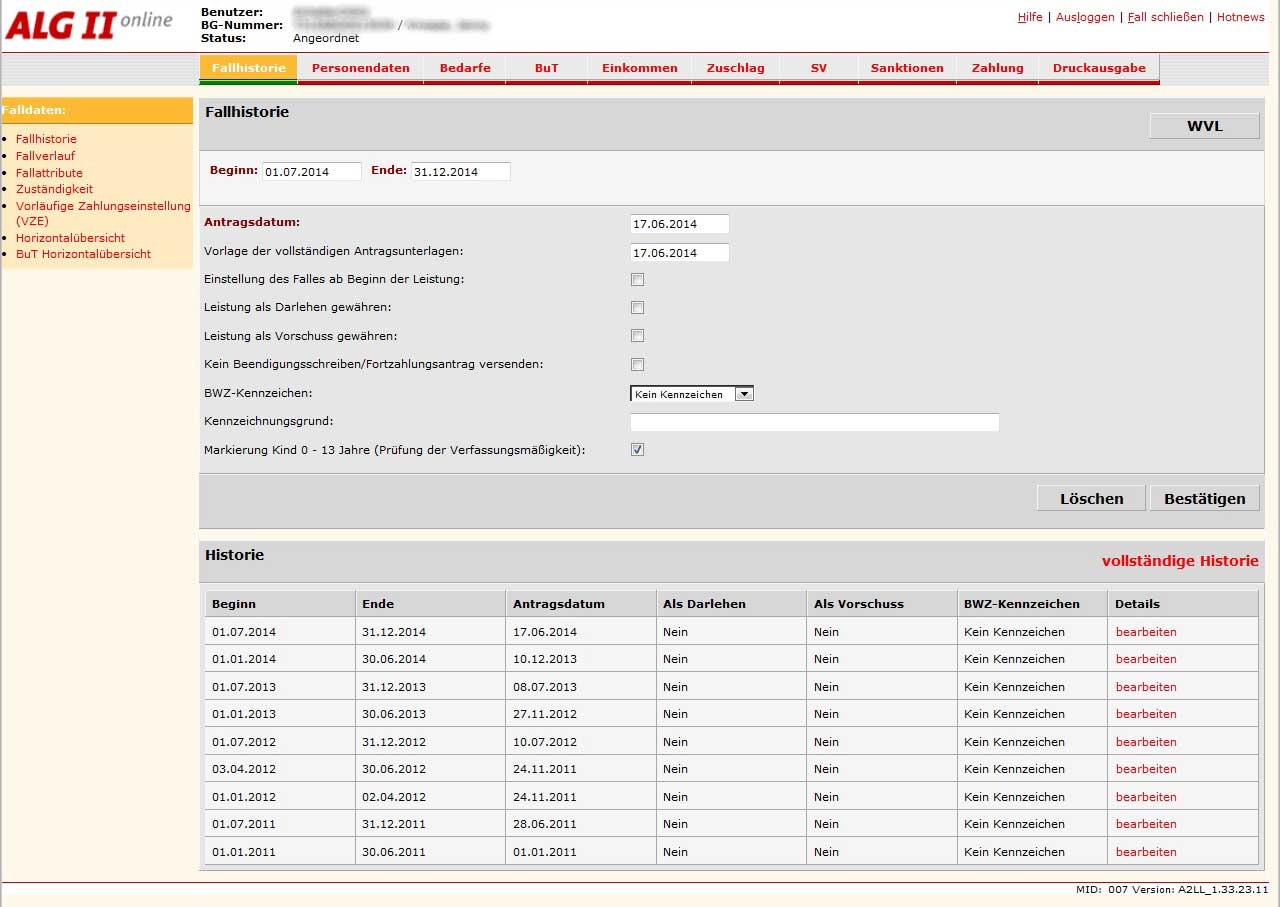
A screenshot of the A2LL website from 2014 with private information blurred for privacy reasons.

A2LL is the abbreviation of the German social services and unemployment software system "Arbeitslosengeld II – Leistungen zum Lebensunterhalt" (Unemployment money II - subsistence payments). This eGovernment process was to help combine unemployment insurance and welfare, but has instead become one of the many difficulties associated with the Hartz IV reforms in Germany.

== Development ==
A2LL was first developed by a consortium of T-Systems, the software division of the former German state telecommunications company, and ProSoz, with a team of 30 developers, in the town of Herten. The software, which was delivered late in the last quarter of 2004, went live on January 1, 2005. It is now only maintained by T-Systems, since ProSoz left the consortium in May 2005, allegedly due to being on the brink of bankruptcy, (according to the local paper "Hertener Allgemeine").

== Technology ==
The software is used in the social services offices through a web browser interface using secure communication. Administrative changes are only possible by direct access to the system via intranet of the Bundesagentur für Arbeit - the social services agency responsible for administering welfare.

The system is based on 16 servers with 4 processors each, all running Linux. A Tomcat servlet container defines the graphical user interface. A web services framework from the Systinet company, uses a server farm of approximately 200 Windows 2003 servers which run the application server developed by ProSoz. The application server was developed using Microsoft's (D)COM technology and uses an Informix 9.4x database running on a Solaris machine containing 80 CPUs and a 300 GB Cache-RAM.

== History ==
The software was delivered to large German cities such as Cologne, Hamburg, Frankfurt and Berlin on October 18, 2004. Other towns followed on October 21, although only 20% of the end user stations were permitted to use the system, to keep it from going down. More and more stations were soon added to the system, but there were many problems with the extremely slow response and data entry times. Staff in the social services agencies had to work overtime to get as much data into the system as possible before the start.

On December 23, 2004, the system had 2.6 million households registered and the FINAS booking system was prepared to send out 1.3 billion euros to accounts across the nation on January 1.

The first major error was found during the first payment - account numbers which were shorter than the standard 10 digits were filled up with zeros on the end instead of the beginning (i.e., 1234567 became 1234567000 instead of the correct 0001234567). The banks could not process the payments and thus had to be credited to fragment accounts until they could be sorted out. Due to the massive number of mistakes, the banks had to invest much effort into locating the owners, and the government had to issue emergency cash so that people could buy food.

As a quick fix the system switched to printing checks (not normally used in German financial transactions), but since the field for the street name chosen was too small, many of the checks could not be delivered to the intended recipients.

The software house ProSoz, a wholly owed subsidiary of the city of Herten, was on the brink of bankruptcy and resigned from the consortium. T-Systems hired the programmers from the company.

Even six months after the start of the system, there were many needed features of the system that could not be used. For example, neither an analysis of variance nor a list of persons who had received too much money could be printed. The printing of documents was not flexible enough to fit many local situations. New legal rules for deducting current income from small jobs could not be completed in time for the official start of the system on October 1, 2005.

In July 2005 it was discovered that the system could not cope with one-time payments, for example so that schoolchildren could purchase books; consequently, this feature was disabled entirely. A few days later it was discovered that the system was not registering people properly with their insurance companies, causing enormous administrative headaches for the insurance providers.

In September 2005 the German press reported that the system had been transferring 25 million euros too much per month to the insurance providers. This meant that they could not calculate the new, lower insurance rate that was mandated to save the government money. According to press reports, an expert committee had determined the software to be non-maintainable and non-adaptable and was considering a completely new software system, just 9 months after it had gone into operation.
