= Hr-Bigband =

Background information
- Origin: Germany
- Genres: Jazz, big band
- Years active: 1946–present
- Website: hr-bigband.de

The hr-Bigband is the big band of Hessischer Rundfunk, the public broadcasting network of the German state of Hesse. Founded 1946 as Tanz- und Unterhaltungsorchester des Hessischen Rundfunks it was renamed to hr Big Band in 1972. Since 2005 it has been written hr-Bigband. For international tours and CD releases it is also named Frankfurt Radio Bigband.

In its first decades, it mainly provided popular music for radio and TV shows. It changed into a jazz big band in the 1970s. The hr-Bigband plays approximately 50 concerts a year, covering a wide range of jazz styles and also crossing the boundaries to pop, classical, world and electronic music. After three years as artist in residence, Jim McNeely became chief conductor in 2011.

== Chief conductors ==
- Willy Berking (1946–1972)
- Heinz Schönberger (1972–1989)
- Kurt Bong (1989–2000)
- Jörg Achim Keller (2000–2008)
- Örjan Fahlström (2008–2011)
- Jim McNeely (2011–present)

== Discography ==
- 2013

Wunderkammer XXL - Michael Wollny, Tamar Halperin & hr-Bigband; Ltg.: Jörg Achim Keller
Rise & Arrive - Christian Elsässer & hr-Bigband

- 2012

Songs I Like a Lot - John Hollenbeck, Kate McGerry, Theo Bleckmann & hr-Bigband
composed & arranged - Oliver Leicht & hr-Bigband

- 2010

Out of the Desert Live at Jazzfest Berlin - Joachim Kühn Trio & hr-Bigband (unter der Leitung von Ed Partyka; ausgezeichnet mit dem Echo Jazz 2012)
It's Only Love - Tania Maria und die hr-Bigband live (geleitet von Jörg Achim Keller)

- 2009

Money Jungle – Ellington reorchestrated (Neubearbeitung von Duke Ellington's Money Jungle durch Jörg Achim Keller; Preis der deutschen Schallplattenkritik)
Viva o Som! - The Music of Hermeto Pascoal, arrangiert von Steffen Schorn
A Single Sky, composed Dave Douglas, conducted and arranged Jim McNeely, with Christian Jaksjø
Visions of Miles, arranged Colin Towns

- 2008

music for bigband vol. 1, featuring Jonas Schoen
Limbic System Files, featuring nuBox, DJ Illvibe and Ed Partyka (Arranging, Conducting)

- 2007

hr-Bigband feat. Jack Bruce - arranged and conducted by Jörg Achim Keller, feat. Jack Bruce (Bass, Vocals, Guitar, Piano, Composition)

- 2006

Meeting of the Spirits - A Celebration of the Mahavishnu Orchestra, feat. Billy Cobham (Drums), arranged + directed by Colin Towns
Once in a Lifetime, feat. Joey DeFrancesco (Hammond Organ), Jeff Hamilton (Drums), Jörg Achim Keller (Ltg.)
Here's to Life, Here's To Joe, Jörg Achim Keller (Ltg.), Bill Ramsey (voc.)

- 2005

Pictures at an Exhibition / Echoes of Aranjuez, Jörg Achim Keller, Bill Holman (Ltg.), Clare und Brent Fisher

- 2004

Do It Again - Three Decades of Steely Dan, Fred Sturm (Ltg.), Ryan Ferreira (Git.)

- 2003

Two Suites: Tribal Dances / Cottacatya, Ralf Schmid, Martin Fondse (Ltg.)
Scorched (Mark-Anthony Turnage) mit John Scofield, John Patitucci, Peter Erskine, Radio-Sinfonie-Orchester Frankfurt unter Hugh Wolff (Ltg.)
¡Libertango! - Hommage an Astor Piazzolla, Enrique Tellería (Bandoneon), Fred Sturm (Arr.), Jörg Achim Keller (Ltg.)

- 2002

Swinging Christmas, Marjorie Barnes (Voc.), Frits Landesbergen (Vibraphon), Jörg Achim Keller (Ltg.)

- 2001

American Songs of Kurt Weill, Silvia Droste, Jeff Cascaro (Voc.), Jörg Achim Keller (Ltg.)
The Three Sopranos, Buddy DeFranco, Rolf Kühn, Eddie Daniels (Klarinette), Kurt Bong (Ltg.)
Futter für die Seele, Jazzkantine, Laith Al-Deen, Rolf Stahlhofen, Edo Zanki
