= Vincent Peirani =

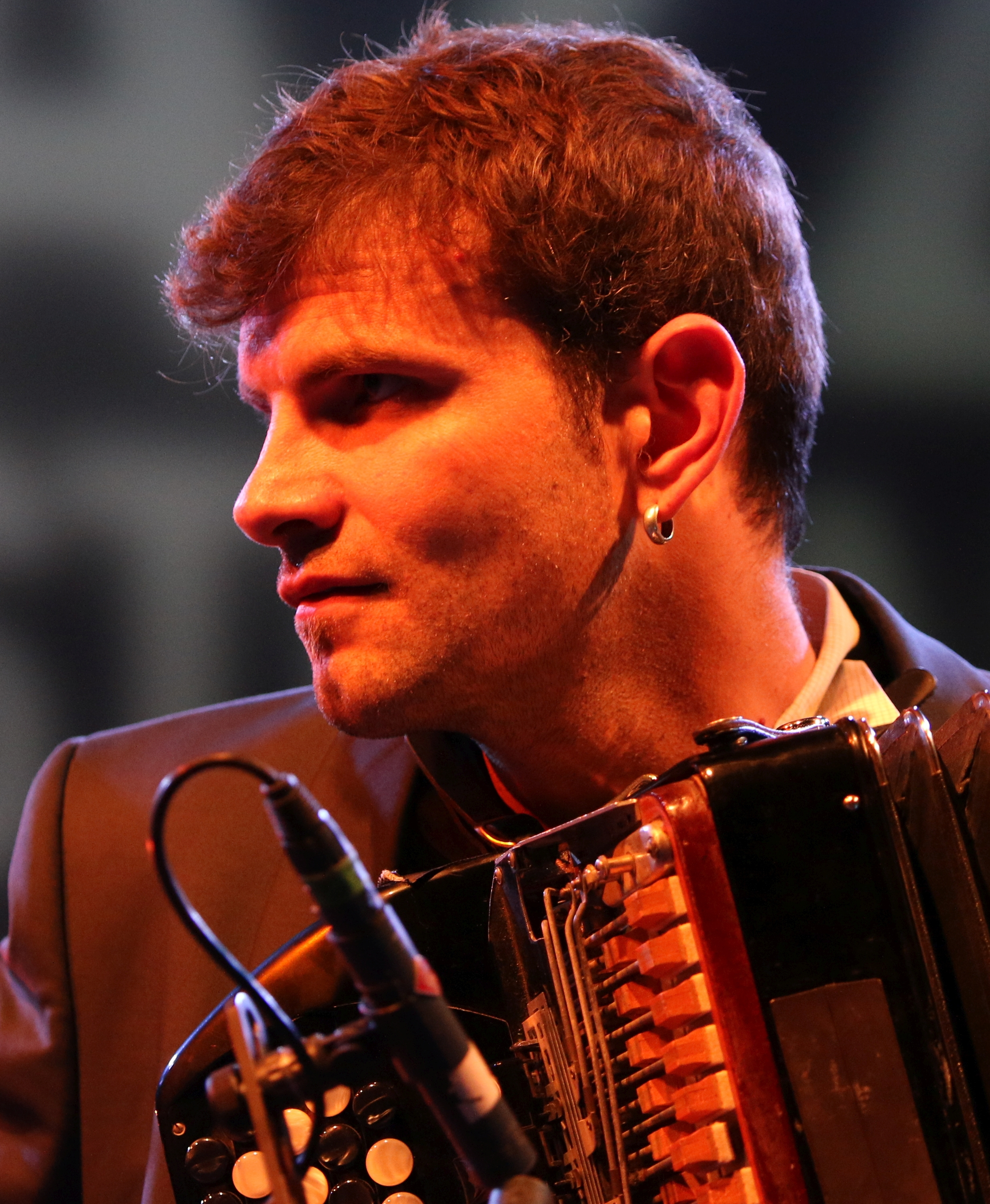
- Vincent Peirani performing at Deutsches Jazz Festival in 2015

Background information
- Born: 24 April 1980 (age 45)
- Origin: Nice, France
- Genres: Jazz
- Instrument: Accordion (bayan)
- Labels: ACT
- Website: www.vincent-peirani.com

Vincent Peirani (born 24 April 1980) is a French jazz accordionist, vocalist and composer who has played internationally, collaborating with Denis Colin, François Jeanneau, Youn Sun Nah, Émile Parisien, Michel Portal, Louis Sclavis, and Michael Wollny, among others.

== Career ==
He studied clarinet and solfège at the Conservatoire de Paris. He received several awards, including international awards, between 1994 and 1998, such as the 1998 Prix d'Accordéon Classique of the conservatory. He turned to jazz the same year.

In 2000, Peirani won a First Prize in jazz and a First Prize in music theory and jazz harmony. From 2001, he studied jazz and improvisation at the Conservatoire de Paris, with Daniel Humair, Dré Pallemaerts, Hervé Sellin, Patrick Moutal (Indian Music), François Théberge, Riccardo Del Fra, and Glenn Ferris. He graduated with distinction in June 2004, after winning first prize in the national jazz competition of La Défense with saxophonist Vincent Lê Quang in 2003. Peirani collaborated in the 2000s in France with Michel Portal, Daniel Humair (Sweet and Sour, 2011), Renaud Garcia-Fons, Louis Sclavis (Dans la nuit), François Jeanneau, Jean-Philippe Muvien (Air Libre), Olivier Calmel (Empreintes, 2007), Youn Sun Nah, Denis Colin, and Anne Paceo. He made jazz recordings from 2003, beginning with an album with the European Jazz Youth Orchestra (Swinging Europe). In 2010 he first recorded his own compositions (Gunung Sebatu). He recorded in duo with the cellist François Salque, including the album Tanguillo.

He founded a quintet, Living Being, playing from 2013 with the trumpeter Mathias Eick and the vocalist Leïla Martial. They played at the 10th Jazzahead Festival in Bremen.

In 2016, he recorded the album Tandem with pianist Michael Wollny. A reviewer called it a symbiotic result, interpretations following the intentions of the composers (Interpretationen im Sinn der Komponisten). Peirani was invited by Wollny – then artist in residence of the Rheingau Musik Festival – to play a concert at the Kurhaus Wiesbaden also with vocalist Andreas Schaerer and the saxophonist Émile Parisien. A reviewer noted his at times impressionistic sensitivity for sounds and his tender finesse.

== Awards ==
In 2014, Peirani was awarded the Frank Ténot prize of the Victoires du Jazz as the "Instrumental revelation". In May 2015, he received an Echo Jazz both as an instrumentalist and for his duo with Michael Wollny. His albums Thrill Box and Tandem were also awarded the prize. In 2016, he was named a Chevalier of the Order of Arts and Letters.

== Discography ==
Peirani has made many recordings, mostly for ACT.

As leader or co-leader

- 2009 – Gunung Sebatu with Vincent Lê Quang (saxophone), Zig Zag Territoires
- 2008 – Mélosolex, Label Ouïe / Anticraft distribution
- 2011 – Est with François Salque (cello), Zig Zag Territoires
- 2011 – Vagabond, with Lars Danielsson / Ulf Wakenius, ACT
- 2012 – Thrill Box with Michael Wollny (p) and Michel Benita (b), ACT
- 2013 – Tanguillo with François Salque and Tomás Gubitsch, Zig Zag Territoires
- 2014 – Belle Époque with Émile Parisien, ACT
- 2015 – Living Being, with Émile Parisien (cl, ts), Yoann Serra (d), Tony Paeleman (Fender Rhodes), Julien Herné (elb), ACT
- 2016 – Tandem, with Peirani and Wollny, ACT
- 2018 – Living Being II - Night Walker, ACT

Participations

- 2013 – Stromae, Racine carrée, Mercury Records
- 2013 – Journal Intime, Extension des Feux, Neuklang Records
- 2013 – Richard Bona, Bonafied, Universal Jazz
- 2013 – Youn Sun Nah, Lento, ACT
- 2013 – Thiefs, Melanine Harmonic Recordings
- 2013 – Gael Faye, Pili Pili Sur Un Croissant Au Beurre, Universal Music
- 2013 – Serena Fisseau, D'Une, Île à l'Autre, Naïve
- 2012 – Daniel Humair, Sweet & Sour, Laborie
- 2011 – Bénabar, Les Bénéfices du doute
- 2010 – Roberto Alagna, Live à Nîmes (DVD), Universal Music
- 2010 – Les Yeux Noirs, Tiganeasca, Zig Zag Territoires
- 2010 – Livre disque pour enfants Mon imagier des amusettes, Tomes 1 and 2, Gallimard
- 2009 – David Sire, David Sire, Sélénote
- 2009 – Laurent Korcia, Cinéma, EMI
- 2009 – Mike Ibrahim, La Route du Nord, Universal / Polydor
- 2008 – Sanseverino, Sanseverino aux Bouffes du Nord, Sony / BMG
- 2007 – Hadrien Feraud, Dreyfus Records
- 2007 – Les Yeux Noirs, Oprescena, ZZT
- 2007 – Olivier Calmel, Empreintes, Musica Guild
- 2007 – Yves Simon, Rumeurs, Universal / Barclay
- 2006 – Muriel Bloch and Éric Slabiak, Orphée Dilo and autres contes des Balkans, Naïve
- 2006 – Muriel Bloch and Éric Slabiak, Carte postale des Balkans, Naïve
- 2006 – Jean-Philippe Muvien, Air Libre, Allgorythm
- 2005 – Marie-Amélie Seigner, Merci pour les fleurs, Symbolic
- 2005 – Le Cirque Des Mirages, Fumée d'Opium, Universal Music
- 2004 – Sophie Forte, Sophie Forte, Niark Productions
- 2003 – Lansiné Kouyaté and David Neerman, Kangaba, Popcornlab
- 2003 – Youn Sun Nah, Down By Love, HUB Music/Warner EMI Korea
- 2003 – The European Union Jazz Youth Orchestra, European Jazz Orchestra 2003, Music Mecca
- 2002 – Les Yeux Noirs, Live, (EMI/Odéon)
