= Andreas Schaerer =

Swiss jazz vocalist, composer, academic teacher

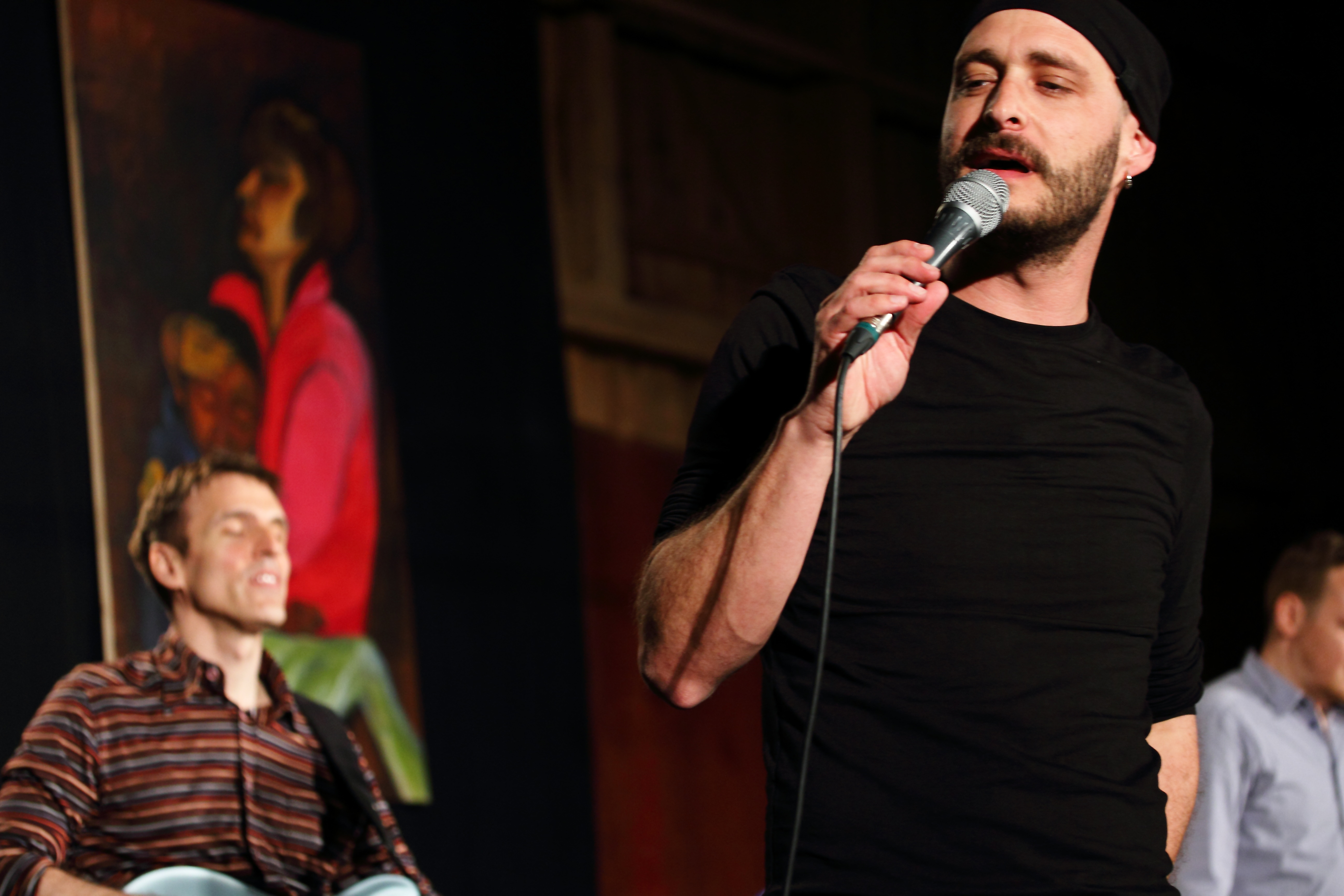
- Schaerer with Rom/Schaerer/Eberle at the INNtöne Jazzfestival 2016
- Born: 17 December 1976 (age 49); Visp
- Education: Hochschule der Künste Bern
- Occupations: Jazz vocalist; Academic teacher
- Organizations: Hildegard Lernt Fliegen; Hochschule der Künste Bern
- Awards: Preis der Deutschen Schallplattenkritik
- Website: www.andreasschaerer.ch

Andreas Schaerer (born 17 December 1976) is a Swiss jazz vocalist and composer, performing internationally, and an academic teacher. He founded the sextet 'Hildegard Lernt Fliegen' and collaborated with notable international musicians, including Bobby McFerrin for the improvised opera Bobble.

== Life and work ==
Born in Visp, Schaerer grew up in Emmental and Wallis. He studied at the Lehrerseminar (teachers' seminary) in Hofwil, and received the patent for primary school and Realschule in 1997. He became guitar player for the punk band Hektor lebt. Schaerer travelled extensively in South America. From 2000 and 2006, he studied at the Hochschule der Künste Bern, voice with Sandy Patton and Denise Bregnard, improvisation with Andy Scherrer, and composition with Klaus König, Christian Henking and Frank Sikora.

He founded his own projects, such as the sextet Hildegard Lernt Fliegen (Hildegard learns to fly), touring a Europe up to Russia (Cinema Hildegard, 2010), and also to China. He writes for the sextet "skurrile Programme zwischen Kunstlied und aberwitzig-vertrackten Spielereien" (between art song and playfulness). He improvises in duos, with the bassist Bänz Oester and with the percussionist Lucas Niggli. He has performed in trio with Martin Eberle (born 1981, trumpet and flugelhorn) and the guitarist Peter Rom (born 1972), and with Christoph Steiner and Claude Meier (Das Beet). Schaerer is also active as a studio musician and composer in a variety of styles including free style and hip-hop, and writing music for computer games and animated films.

In 2009 and 2010, he collaborated with Bobby McFerrin for the improvised opera Bobble in Basel and Moscow. He has appeared with Soweto Kinch, Christy Dorans New Bag, The Ploctones, Kaspar Ewald's Exorbitantes Kabinett, Jan Galega Brönnimann, Colin Vallon, Elina Duni and Joe Haider. In 2017, he invited by Michael Wollny, then artist in residence of the Rheingau Musik Festival, to play at the Kurhaus Wiesbaden a concert with also saxophonist Émile Parisien and accordionist Vincent Peirani. A reviewer noted that he is interested, as the others, to expand the spectrum of his "instrument", and described his excentric-capricious vocal improvisations bordering percussive sounds, and a sometime "sacred" touch in the high register ("exzentrisch-kapriziösen Vokalimprovisationen auf der Grenze zum pointiert perkussionistischen Geräuschemacher über eine mitunter sakrale Anmutung in den Höhen").

Schaerer co-founded in 2007 with Marc Stucki and Benedikt Reising the Berner Jazzwerkstatt (Bern jazz workshop). He has taught at the Hochschule der Künste in Bern from 2009, jazz vocals, improvisation and ensemble playing.

== Awards ==
In 2008, his sextet Hildegard Lernt Fliegen was awarded the ZKB-Jazzpreis. The band has been sponsored from 2010 by Pro Helvetia. The Album Arcanum with Niggli was in 2014 on the list of the best of the Preis der deutschen Schallplattenkritik.

Schaerer has received the European Musician award from the Académie du Jazz on March 4, 2024, in Montrouge.

== Vocal technique ==
Schaerer is known for his eclectic array of vocal styles, and is noted for incorporating multiple techniques into one song. He is noted for his extensive scat singing, and his wide variety of vocal timbres which include opera, crooning, soul, and sprechgesang. He is also noted for his usage of beatboxing, which he has been known to use as the primary percussive accompaniment in a number of his songs, occasionally while singing simultaneously. He often incorporates the Mouth trumpet technique, into his songs, harmonizing with the horn sections, of his groups.

== Discography ==
- Hildegard Lernt Fliegen, mit Roman Bieri, Katrin Lo Cher, Matthias Wenger, Patrick Schnyder, Marco Mueller, Christoph Steiner, 2007 (Unit Records)
- Vom fernen Kern der Sache, with Andreas Tschopp, Vera Kappeler, Matthias Wenger, Patrick Schnyder, Marco Muller, Christoph Steiner, 2009 (Unit)
- schibboleth, with Bänz Oester, 2010) (Unit)
- At the Age of Six I Wanted to Be a Cook, Rom/Schaerer/Eberle, 2013 (Unit)
