= Victoires du Jazz =

French music award

Les Victoires du jazz is a program of annual French jazz awards which grew out of the larger Victoires de la Musique (of which they first featured as a class of awards in 1986). The prizes were then awarded within the Victoires de la musique classique from 1994-2001. In 2002, a ceremony dedicated specifically to jazz was created.

== Jazz musician of the year ==
- 1986 : Didier Lockwood
- 1987 : Stéphane Grappelli
- 1988 : Michel Petrucciani
- 1990 : Michel Petrucciani

== Artist or group of the year ==
- 2002 : Emmanuel Bex Trio BFG (avec Glenn Ferris et Simon Goubert)
- 2003 : Sylvain Luc Trio Sud
- 2004 : Lionel Belmondo et Stéphane Belmondo
- 2005 : Stéphane Belmondo
- 2006 : Daniel Mille
- 2007 : Hadouk Trio
- 2008 : Andy Emler MégaOctet
- 2009 : Marc Ducret
- 2010 : Médéric Collignon Jus de Bocse
- 2011 : Jean-Philippe Viret Trio
- 2012 : Bojan Z
- 2013 : Ibrahim Maalouf
- 2014 : Émile Parisien
- 2015 : Vincent Peirani
- 2016 : Anne Paceo
- 2017 : Thomas de Pourquery
- 2018 : Laurent de Wilde
- 2019 : Anne Paceo
- 2020 : Paul Lay et Laurent Coulondre
- 2021 : Pierrick Pédron
- 2022 : Sophie Alour
- 2023 : Géraldine Laurent

== Group of the year ==
- 2017 : Electro Deluxe
- 2018 : The Amazing Keystone Big Band
- 2019 : Le Sacre du Tympan directed by Fred Pallem
- 2020 : Trio Viret, Dal Sasso Big Band, and Magma
- 2021 : Belmondo Quintet

== Jazz revelation of the year ==
- 1996 : Jean-Yves D'Angelo

== Instrumental revelation (Frank Ténot prize) ==
- 2003 : Baptiste Trotignon
- 2004 : Franck Avitabile New Trio
- 2005 : Pierre Bertrand et Nicolas Folmer pour le Paris Jazz Big Band
- 2006 : Le Sacre du Tympan
- 2007 : Médéric Collignon Jus de Bocse
- 2008 : Géraldine Laurent et Yaron Herman, lauréats ex-aequo
- 2009 : Emile Parisien Quartet
- 2010 : Ibrahim Maalouf
- 2011 : Anne Paceo Triphasé
- 2012 : Sandra Nkaké
- 2013 : Thomas Enhco
- 2014 : Vincent Peirani
- 2015 : Airelle Besson
- 2016 : Laurent Coulondre

Rising star

- 2017 : Théo Ceccaldi
- 2018 : David Enhco
- 2019 : Fidel Fourneyron
- 2020 : Macha Gharibian, Christophe Panzani
- 2021 : Sélène Saint-Aimé
- 2022 : Arnaud Dolmen
- 2023 : Jeanne Michard

== Vocal artist or group of the year ==
- 2002 : Anne Ducros
- 2003 : Anne Ducros
- 2006 : Elisabeth Kontomanou
- 2008 : André Minvielle
- 2009 : Bernard Lubat
- 2010 : Élise Caron
- 2011 : David Linx and Maria João

Vocalist of the year

- 2017 : Hugh Coltman
- 2018 : Cécile McLorin Salvant
- 2019 : David Linx
- 2020 : Leïla Martial
- 2021 : Isabel Sörling
- 2022 : Marion Rampal
- 2023 : Camille Bertault and Hugh Coltmann

== Jazz instrumental album of the year ==
- 1985 : Didier Lockwood, Out of the Blues
- 1992 : Michel Petrucciani, Playground
- 1993 : André Ceccarelli, Hat Snatcher
- 1994 : Michel Petrucciani, Promenade with Duke
- 1995 : Marcel Azzola, L'Accordéoniste et Eddy Louiss & Michel Petrucciani, Conférence de presse
- 1997 : Richard Galliano, New York Tango
- 2003 : Jacky Terrasson, Smile (Blue Note / EMI)
- 2004 : Lionel Belmondo et Stéphane Belmondo, Hymne au soleil (B-Flat recordings/Discograph)
- 2005 : Stéphane Belmondo, Wonderland (B-Flat recordings/Discograph)
- 2006 : Lionel Belmondo, Stéphane Belmondo et Yusef Lateef, Influence (B-Flat recordings/Discograph)
- 2007 : Michel Portal Birdwatcher et Bojan Z, Xenophonia (Ex Aequo)
- 2008 : Pierre de Bethmann, Oui (Nocturne)
- 2009 : Orchestre national de jazz Daniel Yvinec, Around Robert Wyatt (Bee jazz/Abeille Musique)
- 2010 : Andy Emler Megaoctet, Crouch, touch, engage (Naïve)
- 2011 : Éric Legnini & The Afro Jazz Beat, The Vox (Discograph)
- 2013 : Médéric Collignon et le Jus de Bocse, À la recherche du roi frippé, (Just Looking Production)
- 2014 : Thomas de Pourquery & Supersonic, Thomas de Pourquery & Supersonic Play Sun Ra, (Quark/L'Autre Distribution)
- 2015 : Stéphane Kerecki, Nouvelle vague
- 2016 : Sylvain Rifflet, Mechanics
- 2020 : Géraldine Laurent, Cooking
- 2021 : Michel Portal, MP85, produced, directed and arranged by Bojan Z (Label Bleu)
- 2022 : Cécile McLorin Salvant, Ghost Song, (Nonesuch)
- 2023 : Pierrick Pédron and Gonzalo Rubalcaba, Pédron Rubalcaba, (Gazebo)

"Sensation" album of the year

- 2017 : Émile Parisien, Sfumato
- 2018 : Roberto Negro, Badada
- 2019 : Vincent Peirani, Living Being II (Night Walker)

Unclassable album of the year

- 2017 : Pierre Bertrand (musician) & Caja Negra, Joy
- 2018 : Raphaël Imbert, Music is My Hope
- 2019 : Naïssam Jalal (نيسم جلال), Quest Of The Invisible (2CD)

World Music album of the year

- 2020 : Rocío Márquez, Visto en el Jueves
- 2021 : San Salvador, La grande folie
- 2022 : Piers Farcini, Shapes of the fall
- 2023 : Abdullah Miniawy, Peter Corser, and Karsten Hochapfel, Le cri du Caire

== Honor award ==
- 2010 : Marcus Miller et George Benson
- 2011 : André Ceccarelli
- 2012 : Maceo Parker et Jean-Philippe Allard
- 2017 : Guy Le Querrec (photographer)
- 2018 : Rhoda Scott
- 2019 : Henri Texier et Gregory Porter
- 2020 : Orchestre national de jazz
- 2021 : Alain Jean-Marie
- 2022 : Christian Escoudé

== Prizes no longer awarded ==
=== Blues album of the year ===
- 2003 : Jean-Jacques Milteau

=== Midem prize ===
- 2003 : Esbjörn Svensson
- 2004 : Norah Jones (Blue Note/EMI)
- 2006 : Tineke Postma

=== People's choice prize ===
- 2003 : Captain Mercier
- 2004 : Lionel et Stéphane Belmondo Hymne au soleil (B-Flat recordings/Discograph)
- 2005 : Erik Truffaz, Saloua
- 2009 : Patrick Artero Vaudoo (Plus Loin/Harmonia Mundi)

=== International Artist or group of the year ===
- 2004 : Richard Bona (Universal, France/Universal)
- 2005 : Madeleine Peyroux

=== International Album French production of the year ===
- 2010 : Chamber Music : Ballaké Sissoko & Vincent Segal, (No Format/Universal)
- 2011 : À fable : Tigran Hamasyan, Verve Records
