= Tamar Halperin =

Israeli harpsichordist

- תמר הלפרין
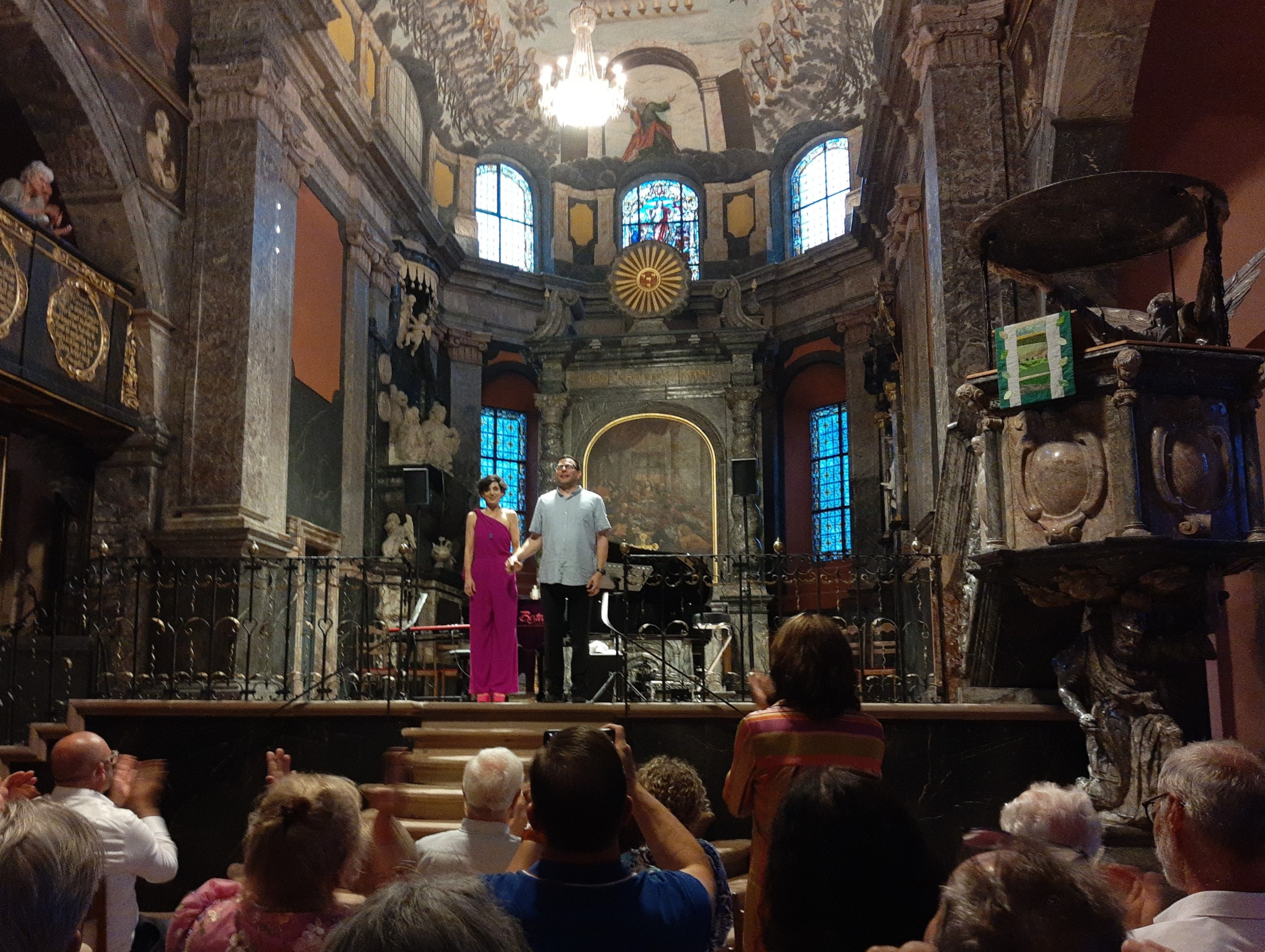
- Halperin with Andreas Scholl at Unionskirche, Idstein, 2025
- Born: 1976 (age 49–50); Tel Aviv, Israel
- Education: University of Tel Aviv; Schola Cantorum Basiliensis
- Occupations: harpsichordist; pianist
- Spouse: Andreas Scholl
- Awards: Echo Jazz; Hessian Cultural Prize

Tamar Halperin (Hebrew: תמר הלפרין; born 1976) is an Israeli harpsichordist, pianist and musicologist. She has played Baroque music in historically informed performance, but also classical repertory and jazz with a big band.

== Career ==
Born in Tel Aviv, Halperin grew up in Israel and first pursued a career as a tennis player. She studied music at the Tel Aviv University and continued her studies at the Schola Cantorum Basiliensis with a focus on historically informed performance. She obtained her PhD at the Juilliard School in New York City on Johann Sebastian Bach.

She specialises in Baroque music, but also pursues projects of contemporary music. She recorded with the jazz pianist Michael Wollny the album Wunderkammer which was awarded the Echo Jazz in the category piano album in 2010. She recorded a sequel, Wunderkammer XXL, with Wollny and the hr-Bigband which was awarded the Echo Jazz in the category big band. She played harpsichord and celesta with Wollny at the Jazzfest Bonn 2014.

In 2011, she played works by Bach on the harpsichord at the Baroque Christophoruskirche in Wiesbaden-Schierstein, as part of the Rheingau Musik Festival. In 2012, Halperin recorded Lieder by Haydn, Mozart, Schubert and Brahms with her husband, the countertenor Andreas Scholl, titled Wanderer. The reviewer of a similar program at Wigmore Hall noted in The Guardian that she "proved to be a wonderfully subtle accompanist and a performer of real distinction", offering piano works by Mozart and Brahms in addition to the songs. In 2016 she published an album with music by Erik Satie on the occasion of the 150th anniversary of his birth, played on different keyboard instruments including, besides piano and harpsichord, hammond organ and Wurlitzer piano.

The Hessian Cultural Prize 2016 was awarded to both Halperin and Scholl by Volker Bouffier, the Minister-president of Hesse. Michael Herrmann spoke at the event about both artists as crossing borders.

== Awards ==
- 1998–2000: scholarship of the America-Israel Cultural Foundation
- 2004: Ehrenpreis of the Van Vlaanderen Musica Antiqua Brugge Competition
- 2005: Presser Award
- 2006: REC Music Award
- 2006 and 2007: Eisen-Picard Performing Arts Award
- 2010 and 2014: Echo Jazz, for her "Wunderkammer" productions with Michael Wollny
- 2016: Hessischer Kulturpreis (with her husband Andreas Scholl)
