= Same Girl =

Same Girl may refer to:

- "Same Girl" (R. Kelly and Usher song), 2007
- "Same Girl" (Jennifer Lopez song), 2014
- Same Girl (Na Yoon-sun album), 2010
- Same Girl (Twila Paris album), 1987
- "Same Girl", a song by Randy Newman on his 1983 album Trouble in Paradise
- "Same Girl", a song by Tori Kelly on her 2024 album Tori.
