= Xavier Desandre Navarre =

French jazz percussionist and drummer

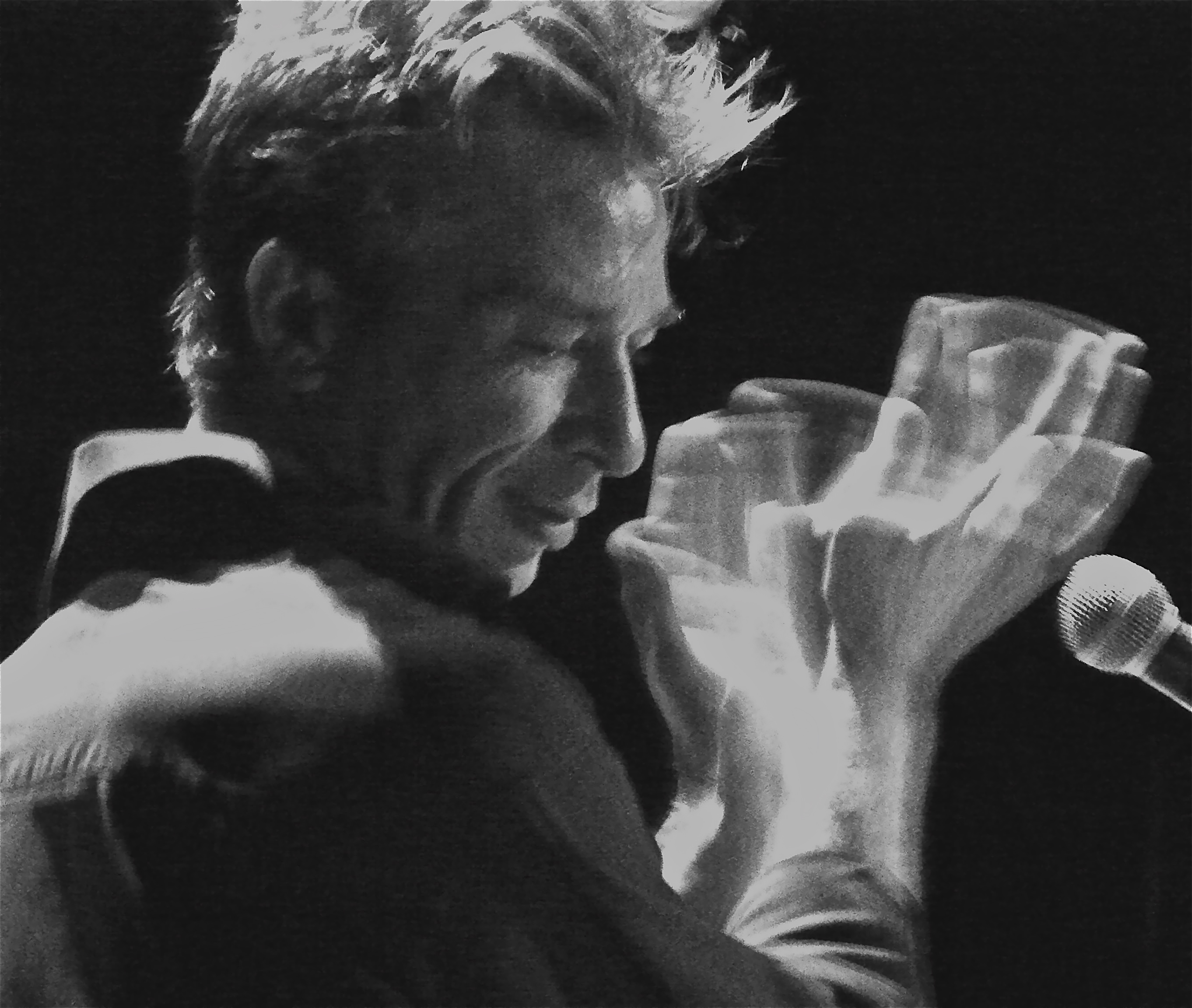
- XDN playing live

Background information
- Also known as: XDN
- Born: 1961 (age 64–65); Paris, France
- Genres: jazz, world music
- Occupations: musician, composer
- Instruments: percussions, drums
- Labels: Peak Power, Melisse (France), Fuga Libera, Universal Music
- Website: www.xavierdesandrenavarre.com

Xavier Desandre Navarre (born 11 October 1961), a.k.a. XDN, is a French jazz musician, percussionist and drummer.

== Youth ==
Xavier Desandre Navarre was born in Paris. He spends a great part of his childhood between Paris and the southern French city of Aix-en-Provence, but a year spent with his family in Iran that awakened his passion for the variety of rhythms offered by percussions. Back in France, in 1975, he starts learning music academically by studying classical percussion at Aix-en-Provence music conservatory. In the meantime, he also learnt Brazilian rhythms and percussion, from samba to candomble, with Sylvio de Santana Jr. and Brazilian musicologist and conductor Nicia Ribas d'Avila. He started playing jazz, and improvising on African and Cuban music. His musical philosophy is to create bridges between these different styles.

== Career ==
In 1987, Xavier Desandre Navarre moved to Paris and begins his career with musician Laurent Cugny in the Big Band Lumière for a European tour with Gil Evans. In 1991, he joined the National Jazz Orchestra directed by Denis Badault. In the same time, he leads a hyperproductive jazz and variety sideman career. Between 1991 and 2012, Xavier Desandre Navarre directs or takes part in more than 150 CDs and recordings, some of which are gold records or have received prestigious distinctions. The latest one was recorded with Korean singer Youn Sun Nah, and was nominated best French jazz album in 2010 and Gold CD in Germany in 2011.

Xavier Desandre Navarre develops a very specific musical identity by the eclectic rhythms he harmonizes with his voice. Along his career, he is the guest of the Tokyo Symphony Orchestra, and plays with such musicians as Manu Dibango, Yaron Herman, David Sanborn, John Scofield, Didier Lockwood or Stefano di Battista. He is also particularly appreciated by scandinavian musicians with whom he records many projects. In this, he plays with guitarist Ulf Wakenius, Niels Lan Doky, Lars Danielsson and singer Caecillie Norby. Equally at ease with the intimacy of jazz and with the superproductions of the electronic scene, he give a live gig with French electro music icon Laurent Garnier, at the Salle Pleyel in Paris in 2010, and later plays the same project for two consecutive nights at the Grand Palais. He also takes part in many shows and performances, as he did for the French Turkish in 2009, by giving a concert at the Jardin des Tuileries in Paris. In 2010, he played in a show called Story of Earth and Water created for the UNESCO. In 2012, he will present his latest solo project Beat, body and soul at the Lyon opera house. At the same time he presents two more creations at the Lyon opera house, United Nations of Groove ( Black music & Jazz) quartet with singer Allonymous and visual designer Tekyes, and In-Pulse acoustic jazz quartet.

In 1998, he composed music for the opening ceremony of the football World Cup in Paris and took part in the creation of the independent production label Peak Power in 1999.

Navarre also composes scores, as he did for Luc Besson's film Léon, starring Jean Reno in 1994, or for Menno Meyjes's Manolete starring Penélope Cruz and Adrien Brody in 2008. All along his career, he also composed many scores for TV documentaries, for Canal+, Arte and France Télévision. More recently, in 2011, he acted the part of a jazz musician in a film dealing with the life of Pierre Goldman.

== Chronology (non-exhaustive) ==
- 1987/88 : Gil Evans & Big Band Lumière Dir° Laurent Cugny : European Tour and recording of 2 albums.
- 1991 / 1994 : Orchestre National de Jazz Dir° Denis Badault : European Tour and recording of 3 albums.
- 1992 : Creation of Solo project : " Tribalmopolite " at the Blue Suburbs Festival.
- 1993 : Charlie Haden & Liberation Orchestra, Concerts at the Blue Suburbs Festival.
- 1994 : Les Rita Mitsouko : French tour and promotion of the " Systeme D " album.
- 1994 : Iwao Furusawa : Japanese and European tours.
- 1994 : Niels Lan Doky, Caecilie Norby, Lars Danielsson, World tours and concerts. Live & studio recordings.
- 1995 / 1998 : Michel Portal, concerts et studio recordings.
- 1997 : Tania Maria : World tours and concerts (incl, Blue Note NYC).
- 1997 : " Dreaming With Open Eyes ". Tour and TV recordings Niels Lan Doky, David Sanborn, Randy Brecker, Lisa Nilsson, Terry Lyne Carrington, Gino Vanelli.
- 1998 : " Mondial 98 " Recording of opening ceremony.
- 1999 : Literary concerts with Frederic Pagès. Gigs and studio recording.
- 2000 : Manu Dibango, World Tour, live and studio recordings (3 CD et DVD).
- 2000 : Records his Cd " Zoom " Spicy & Trippy Jazz.
- 2003 : Lars Danielsson & Symphonic Orchestra, " Libera me " Concerts in Europe, studio recordings TV live broadcasts.
- 2003 : Composer for " Comptines et berceuses du Baobab " CD Book. Golden disc and Grand Prix of the Charles Cros academy.
- 2004 : " Wishing Upon The Moon ", XDN & Niels Lan Doky, Vietnam All Stars. International gigs (incl. Viet-Nam).
- 2005 : Julia Migenes " Alter Ego " & " Hollywood Divas " World Tour.
- 2005 : Carte Blanche du festival de Saint Germain, Nordic Connection X DN Quintet (feat Bobo Stenson, Nils Landgren, Caecilie Norby, Lars Danierlsson).
- 2008 : Youn Sun Nah. Recording of 3 CDs, concerts and world tour (incl. China & South Korea).
- 2009 : " Braining Storm " Studio recording and gigs.
- 2010 : " The Strory of Earth & Water " co-production with Niels Lan Doky of a Cd and a project for the UNESCO.
- 2010 : " Its Just Music " Live DVD at Pleyel with Laurent Garnier.
- 2010 : XDN, Niels Lan Doky & The Daar-Es-Salam University Choir, Concert in Tanzania for the Copenhaguen ecologic forum.
- 2010 : Jacques Vidal Quintet, Concerts and gigs on the music of Charles Mingus.
- 2011 : Creation of solo show BEAT BODY & SOUL.
- 2012 : Cd recording with Jean-Pierre Mas " Juste Après" Cristal records / Harmonia Mundi.
- 2012 : Production of a CD-Book in Brazil with Slammeurs from São Paulo and texts from the afro-Brazilian literature.
- 2012 : Production d'un livre-CD au Brésil avec des Slammeurs de Sao Paulo et des textes issus de la littérature afro-brésilienne.
- 2013 : Album "Lento" avec Youn Sun Nah Disque d'or.
- 2014 : Album "In Pulse" Harmonia Mundi Xavier Desandre Navarre Quartet avec Stéphane Guillaume, Emil Spanyi, et Stéphane Kerecki. Guest Vincent Peirani.
- 2015 : "Wanderer Septet" création du contrebassiste Yves Rousseau avec Régis Huby produit par le Théâtre 71 Scène Nationale de Malakoff autour du répertoire de Franz Schubert.
- 2016 : Tournée "Wanderer" et "In Pulse" création de "Pasionaria" (chants et mots de la guerre d'Espagne) coproduit par le Théâtre de Nîmes.
- 2017 : Professeur invité pour l'Académie de Hautbois internationale dirigée par Jean-Luc Fillon
- 2017 : Concert création : "L'Épopée de Gilgamesh" avec Abed Azrié.
- 2017 : "Wanderer" tournée en Chine.
- 2018 : Artiste créateur en résidence au Théatre de Mlakoff (Scène Nationale)
- 2018 : Création du repertoire IN PULSE 2
- 2018 : Création du nouveau répertoire Xavier Desandre Navarre "Beat Body & Soul" solo concert
- 2019 : Enregistrement d'IN PULSE 2
- 2020 : Création de la pièce "AKZAK" '(danse contemporaine)
- 2020 : Enregistrement d "AKZAK" musique de la chorégraphie D'Héla Fattoumi et Eric Lamoureux
- 2020 : Sortie du CD Xavier Desandre Navarre "IN PULSE 2"
- 2020 : Tournée Xavier Desandre Navarre "IN PULSE 2"
- 2020 : sortie du CD "AKZAK" musique de la chorégraphie D'Héla Fattoumi et Eric Lamoureux
- 2020 : Enregistrement de "Raphael Lemonnier & La Trova project"
- 2020 : Composition de la musique du film "Le fou, le psy, et la pasteure" de Julie Clavier
- 2020 : Tournée "AKZAK" (Europe, Burkina Faso)
- 2021 : Tournée "AKZAK" (Europe, Maroc, Tunisie, Egypte)
- 2021 : Tournée "La Trova Project"

== Discography (non-exhaustive) ==
=== As Leader and co-Leader ===
- Xavier Desandre Navarre "AKZAK" musique de la chorégraphie D'Héla Fattoumi et Eric Lamoureux
- Xavier Desandre Navarre / « IN PULSE 2 » Crystal Records
- Xavier DESANDRE-NAVARRE / "IN PULSE" JazzVillage / harmonia mundi JV 570043
- Xavier DESANDRE-NAVARRE / "Zoom" Peak Power DES 02
- Xavier DESANDRE-NAVARRE / Frédéric PAGES / "Récits Du Sertão" Peak Power DES 03 / Le Grand Babyl / Texts by Brazilian writer João Guimarães Rosa /
- Xavier DESANDRE-NAVARRE / Frédéric PAGES /" Cobra Norato " Grand Babyl Prod° GB 05 / Texts by Brazilian writer Raul Bopp.
- Edouard FERLET 4tet / "L' écharpe d'iris" Melisse (France)
- BRAINING STORM / JL Rassinfosse, F Alleman, JP Collard Neven & X DN (Fuga Libera)
- HOPEN COLLECTIVE / "French Dub Connection" Echo Beach 022 (Germany). / Feat: Cyril Ateff, Jean Phi Dary, Noël Ekwabi, Pascal Mikaelian, Eddy Delaumenie, Glaucus Linx de Oliveira.

=== As a sideman ===
- Raphael Lemonnier "La Trova Project"
- Youn Sun NAH :"Lento" ACT Music
- Youn Sun NAH :"Same Girl" ACT Music
- Youn Sun NAH :"Voyage" ACT Music
- Youn Sun NAH :"Memory Lane " Seoul records / Hub Music (Corea).
- Niels Lan DOKY : "Haïtek Haïku" Universal / Emarcy 548 410–2 UN 900 / Guest and produced by Gino VANELLI /
- Niels Lan DOKY : "Asian Sessions" Universal / Emarcy 546 656 2 / Feat : Paul Wertico, Beijing Symphonic Orchestra (from China), and Thanh Lam (Singer from Vietnam) /
- Niels Lan DOKY : 4tet " Polygram / Verve 559 087-2 / Feat: Lars Danielsson, Jeff boudreaux /
- DOKY BROTHERS 2 " Blue note records 7243 8564582 2 / Feat : Al Jarreau, Dianne Reeves, Bill Evans, John Scofield
- Gil Evans / Laurent CUGNY Big Band LUMIERE : "Golden Hair " Polygram / Emarcy 863 401 /
- Gil EVANS / Laurent CUGNY Big Band LUMIERE :"The Complete Recordings" Emarcy 833 794 Recorded during the longest and the latest Gil EVANS tour in Europe in 1987
- Gil EVANS / Laurent CUGNY Big Band LUMIERE :" Rythm A Ning " Polygram Jazz / Emarcy 863 401
- Laurent CUGNY Big Band LUMIERE : " Sanatander" Polygram /Emarcy 843 266 2 Feat B. Lagrenne /
- Laurent CUGNY Big Band LUMIERE : " Dromesko " Emarcy
- Manu Dibango : "Lion of Africa" DVD / CD Globalmix ( London). Live at the Brabican.
- Manu DIBANGO : "Mboa' Su"
- Manu DIBANGO : "Kamer Feelin" JPS Prod° JPS 64
- Lars DANIELSSON : "Melange Bleu" ACT music.
- Lars DANIELSSON : "Libera me" ACT music./ Feat: Dave Liebman, Nils Peter Molvaer
- Lars DANIELSSON : "Northern Lights" recorded live in Leipzig, Germany./feat: Nils Peter Molvaer, Eyvind Aarset, Jan Bang, Roberto Di Gioia.
- Rick MARGITZA : "Bohemia" Nocturne Prod° / Feat:Laurent De Wilde, Ricardo Del Fra, Baptiste Trotignon...
- Laurent GARNIER : "It's Just Music" DVD live at the Salle Pleyel,/ Paris.
- Caecillie NORBY : " Arabesque " ACT records
- Caecillie NORBY : " Slow Fruit " CPH records
- Caecillie NORBY : "London/Paris " Live, Copenhagen Records CPHREC 001
- Caecillie NORBY : "First Conversation" Universal
- Caecillie NORBY : "Queen of Bad Excuses" Blue Note records./ Feat : J.Scofield, B.Hart, Lars Danielsson, Ulf Wakenius....
- Aldo ROMANO : "Origines" Dreyfuss Jazz
- Jean-Pierre MAS : "(H)Ombre " / Feat Claude Nougaro, Didier Lockwood, Daniel Mille...
- Jean-Pierre MAS : "Juste après" Cristal records
- MAGIC MALIK : " HWI Project " Salam aleikoum / Warner 176542/9
- ORCHESTRE NATIONAL DE JAZZ, (ONJ) dirigé par Denis BADAULT : " Bouquet Final " recorded live Label Bleu, LBLC 6571
- ORCHESTRE NATIONAL DE JAZZ, (ONJ) dirigé par Denis BADAULT : " Monk / Mingus / Ellington " Label Bleu /LBLC 6562
- ORCHESTRE NATIONAL DE JAZZ, (ONJ) dirigé par Denis BADAULT : " A Plus Tard " Label bleu LBLC 6554

- Tony COE, Xavier DESANDRE-NAVARRE, Scott ROBINSON TRIO : " Impressions of Schindler's List " 3361 BLACK / NEC : NACJ 1012

=== Projects with variety musicians ===
- Richard Gotainer : D'Amour et d'Orage (1993)
- Alan Stivell : Brian Boru (1995)
- Manu Dibango : Mboa'Su (2000) Kamer Feeling (2003) Lion of Africa CD, DVD Live (2006)
- Michel Jonasz : Olympia 2000 (2001)
- Rita Mitsouko : "Systeme D" 1994

== Live collaborations and recordings (non-exhaustive) ==
Youn Sun Nah, Gil Evans, David Sanborn, Randy Brecker, Charlie Haden & Liberation Orchestra, John Scofield, Michel Portal, Yaron Herman, Leszek Mozdzer, Joachim Kuhn, Markus Stockhausen, Christof Lauer, Aldo Romano, Rick Margitza, Baptiste Trottignon, Tania Maria, Paolo Fresu, Orchestre National de Jazz ONJ, Jacky Terrasson, Bugge Wesseltoft, Daniel Yvinnec, Ulf Wakenius, Lars Danielsson, Niels Lan Doky, Nils Landgren, Laurent Cugny & Big Band Lumière, Manu Dibango, Jazz Baltica Ensemble, WDR Symphonic Orchestra, Tokyo Symphony Orchestra, Tivoli Symphonic Orchestra, Les Rita Mitsouko, Victoria Tolstoï, Caecillie Norby, Gino Vanelli, Toots Thielmans, Claude Nougaro, Cyril Atef, Didier Lockwood, Nils Peter Molvaer, Jan Bang, Andy Emler, Cheb Mami, Safy Boutela, Baaziz, Dominic Miller, Jean-Philippe Collard-Neven, Jean-Louis Rassinfosse, Fabrice Alleman, Juliette Gréco, Okay Temiz, Prabhu Edouard, Bobo Stenson, Dave Liebman, Jean-Pierre Mas, Jon Balke, John Paricelli, Vincent Segal, Hopen Collective, Alain Jean-Marie, Louis Winsberg, Terri Lyne Carrington, Pierre Boussaguet, Jacques Vidal, Pierrick Pedron, Paul Wertico, Palle Mikelborg, Leon Parker, Boy Gé Mendes, Teco Cardoso, François Moutin, Lelo Nazario, Dudu Trentin, Stephane Belmondo, Lionel Belmondo, Eric Legnini, Stephano Di Battista, Julia Migenes, Edouard Ferlet, Mads Winding, Alex Riel, Baba Maal, Omar Sosa, Nguyen Lé, Courtney Pine, London Gospel Choir, Michel Jonasz, Crazy B, Jean-Phi Dary, Baco Mikaelian, Bireli Lagrène, Al Jarreau, Dianne Reeves, Bill Evans, John Scofield, Laurent Garnier.
