= Michael Wollny =

German jazz pianist and professor

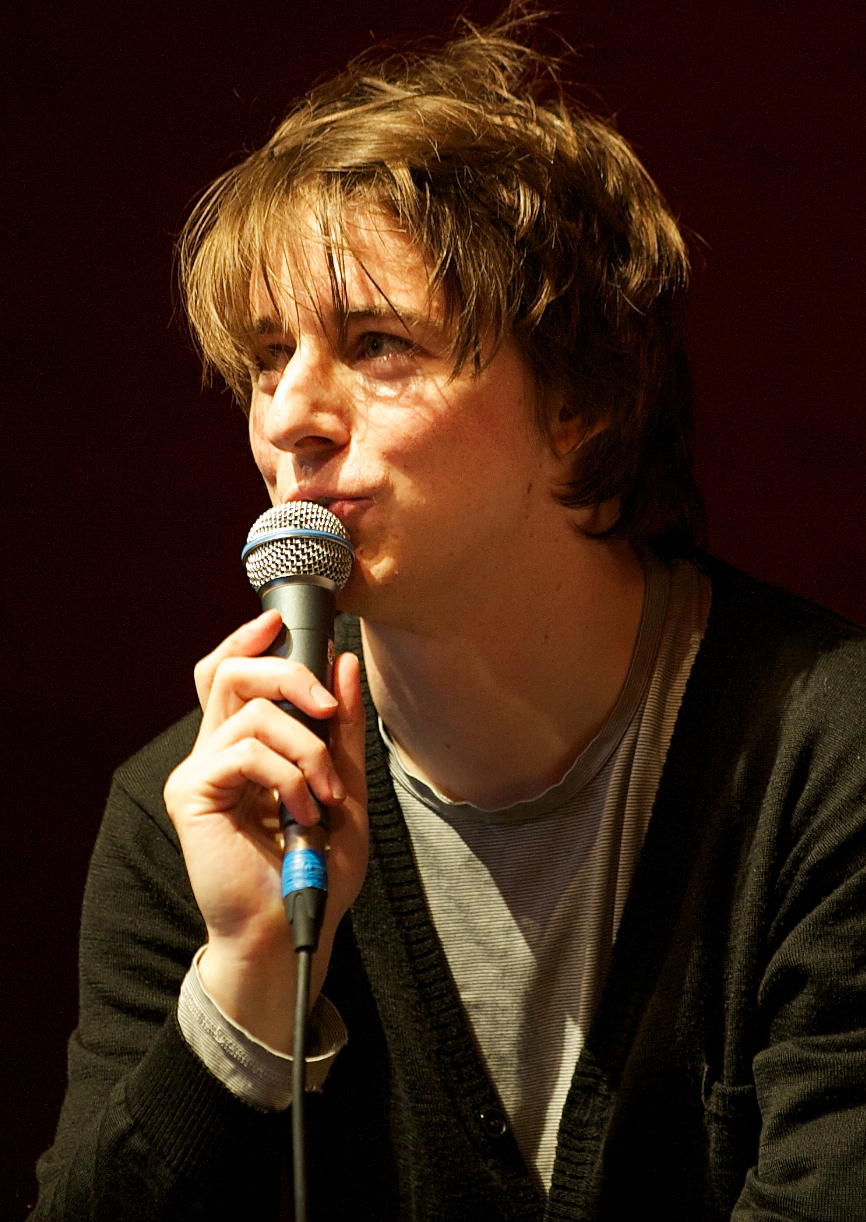
- Wollny in 2010
- Born: 25 May 1978 (age 47); Schweinfurt, West Germany
- Education: Hochschule für Musik Würzburg
- Occupations: Jazz pianist; Academic teacher
- Organizations: [em] (trio); Michael Wollny Trio; Hochschule für Musik und Theater Leipzig
- Awards: Preis der Deutschen Schallplattenkritik; Echo Jazz; Bayerischer Staatspreis für Musik

Michael Wollny (born 25 May 1978) is a German jazz pianist and a professor at the Hochschule für Musik und Theater Leipzig. He has played with international musicians including Joachim Kühn, Tamar Halperin, Marius Neset, Andreas Schaerer, Émile Parisien and Vincent Peirani, and recorded award-winning albums. In his Michael Wollny Trio, he has played with percussionist Eric Schaefer and bassist Tim Lefebvre.

== Education ==
Wollny took piano and violin lessons at the Musikschule Schweinfurt and at the Hermann Zilcher Conservatory in Würzburg until 1997, successfully competing in the Jugend musiziert. He then studied at the Hochschule für Musik Würzburg with Chris Beier. He took the artistic diploma with distinction in 2002, and the master classes diploma in 2004. He also studied with John Taylor and Walter Norris.

== Career ==
From 1998 to 2002, Wollny was a member of the touring Bundesjazzorchester. He also played in a quartet led by Hubert Winter. Wollny's debut album was recorded with Wolfgang Kriener and Joachim Leyh. Wollny has played with Heinz Sauer from 2001 both as a duo and in a quartet. He was also a member of the trio [em], with bassist Eva Kruse and percussionist Eric Schaefer. He recorded CDs as a member of the group Young Friends (Great German Songbook, 2005), with Winter (Different Kind of Stories, 2003), with Hans-Peter Salentin (Beyond Your Thoughts, Sound of Silence), and with Nils Landgren (The Moon, The Stars and You, 2011), among others. He was a regular pianist at the Staatstheater Nürnberg and the Nationaltheater Mannheim from 1999.

In 2005 Wollny signed a contract with the label ACT Music + Vision on which he released several albums with his trio and in collaboration with other artists, such as Sauer and Nils Landgren. In 2007 he released his first solo album Hexentanz. In 2014 his trio, now with bassist Tim Lefebvre, recorded the album Weltentraum, which made the pop charts. A review in The Guardian noted "They are one of the world's great jazz-driven piano trios, and Nachtfahrten takes nothing away from this assessment." In 2017, he was an artist in residence (Fokus Jazz: Michael Wollny) of the Rheingau Musik Festival, interviewed in a Rendezvous, and playing three concerts, improvising with Marius Neset in the first, with vocalist Andreas Schaerer, Émile Parisien and Vincent Peirani in the second, and finally with his trio and the Norwegian Wind Ensemble.

Since 2014 Wollny has lived with his family in Leipzig, where he is a professor at the Hochschule für Musik und Theater Leipzig.

== Awards ==
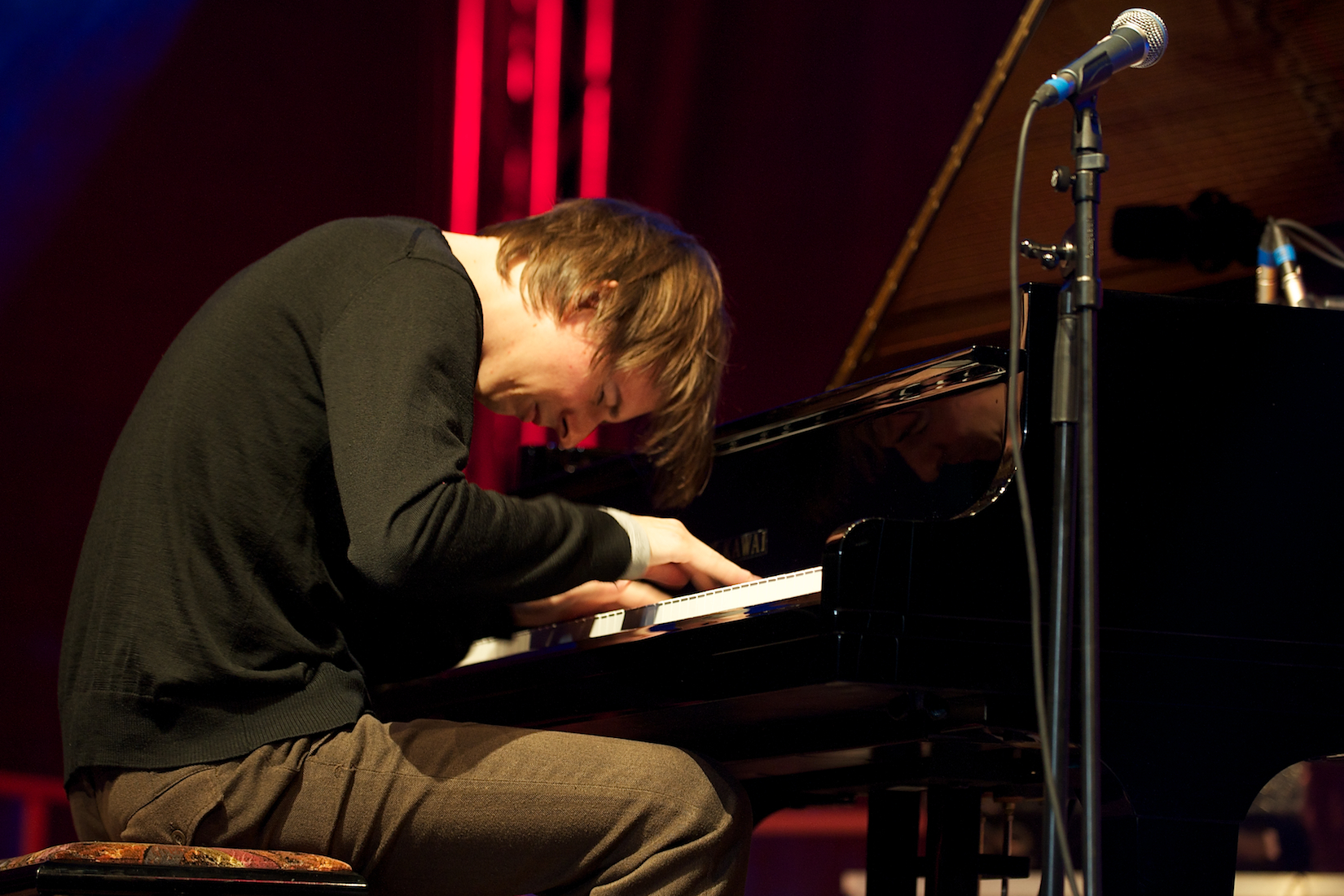
Wollny in concert

Wollny has been awarded several scholarships and prizes, including the cultural prize of Schweinfurt in 2003, and in 2005 both the Preis der Deutschen Schallplattenkritik (for Melancholia with Heinz Sauer) and the Bayerischer Kunstförderpreis. He received the Choc de l'annee 2006 from the French magazine Jazzman (for Certain Beauty with Heinz Sauer), the Jazzpreis of the Nürnberger Nachrichten in 2007, and in 2008 the SWR Jazz Prize, again with Heinz Sauer. He was awarded the Echo Jazz in the category Instrumentalist/in des Jahres national - Piano/Keyboards in 2010 when the prize was awarded for the first time.

The trio received Ronnie Scott's Jazz Award as Most Promising International Newcomer of the Year in London in May 2007. In 2011, they received the Neuer Deutscher Jazzpreis (as a band, and for Wollny as the best soloist), and the Echo Jazz in the category Ensemble des Jahres national. In 2013, Wollny received the Preis der Deutschen Schallplattenkritik for his album Don't Explain – Live in Concert with Heinz Sauer, and the Bayerischer Staatspreis für Musik. The trio received the Echo Jazz as ensemble of the year. Wollny and Sauer were awarded the Binding Culture Prize in 2013. In 2015 and 2016 he was again awarded the Echo Jazz.

== Discography ==
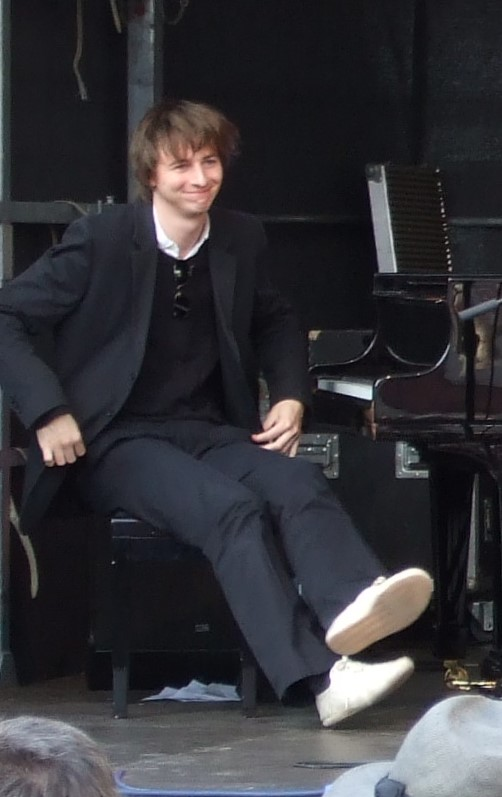
Wollny in 2009

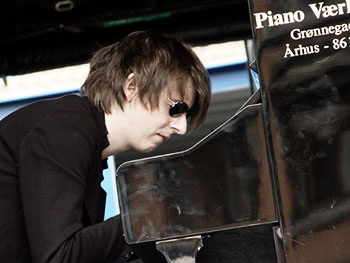
Wollny in 2011

Recordings with Wollny have included:

- Wollny / Kriener / Leyh: CDNR3 (2001)
- Heinz Sauer / Michael Wollny: Melancholia (2004)
- Young Friends: Great German Song Book (2005)
- Wollny / Kruse / Schaefer: Call it [em] (2005)
- Heinz Sauer / Michael Wollny: Certain Beauty (2006)
- Michael Wollny: Piano Works VII: Hexentanz (2007)
- Wollny / Kruse / Schaefer: [em] 3 (2008)
- Joachim Kühn / Michael Wollny: live at Schloss Elmau (2009)
- Michael Wollny / Tamar Halperin: Wunderkammer (2009)
- Wollny / Kruse / Schaefer: [em] LIVE (2010)
- Nils Landgren: The Moon, the Stars and You, with Richard Galliano, Lars Danielsson, Joe Sample, Michael Wollny, Rasmus Kihlberg, Steve Gadd & Stockholm Philharmonic Orchestra (2011)
- Nils Landgren / Michael Wollny: Fragile At Schloss Elmau (2011)
- Wollny / Kruse / Schaefer: [em] Wasted & Wanted (2012)
- Heinz Sauer / Michael Wollny: Don't Explain - Live in Concert (2013)
- Iiro Rantala / Leszek Możdżer / Michael Wollny: Jazz at Berlin Philharmonie I (2013)
- Vincent Peirani with Michael Wollny & Michel Benita: Thrill Box (2013)
- Michael Wollny Trio: Weltentraum (2014) (2014: Goldene Schallplatte, Jazz Award), Preis der deutschen Schallplattenkritik)
- Michael Wollny with Christian Weber and Eric Schaefer: Nachtfahrten (2015) (2015: Gold, Deutschland, Jazz Award)
- Michael Wollny Trio in Concert: Klangspuren (2016)
- Michael Wollny & Vincent Peirani: Tandem (2016)
- Michael Wollny Trio feat. The Norwegian Wind Ensemble and Geir Lysne: Oslo (2018)
- Michael Wollny Trio: Wartburg (2018)
- Michael Wollny: Mondenkind (2020)
- Michael Wollny with Emile Parisien, Tim Lefebvre & Christian Lillinger: XXXX (2021)
- Michael Wollny / Joachim Kühn: Duo (2024)
