= Same Girl (Na Yoon-sun album) =

Studio album by Na Yoon-Sun
- Released: August 17, 2010
- Recorded: 2010
- Studio: Nilento Studios (Gothenburg, Sweden)
- Genre: International jazz, bossa nova
- Length: 47:08
- Label: ACT Music
- Producer: Axel Matignon, Lars Danielsson, Jae Jin In

Na Yoon-Sun chronology
Voyage (2008)	Same Girl (2010)	Lento (2013)

Same Girl is the seventh studio album by South Korean jazz vocalist Na Yoon-Sun, released on 17 August 2010 in Germany. The album contains eleven songs by Na Yoon-Sun. The styles of the album are Korean, North/East Asian Traditions. The album is her second release as a leader of ACT Music, after spending a decade with a French band. The materials are from sources as diverse as Randy Newman, Sergio Mendes, and Metallica. She kept the same ensemble that she worked with on Voyage - guitarist Ulf Wakenius, bassist Lars Danielsson and percussionist Xavier Desandre Navarre. Her talents in treating each syllable in acrobatics and other vocal techniques recorded on Same Girl reinforces her reputation.

Na shows her sense of humor in many of the tracks. In her song, "Pancake," she talks about how much she likes to consume her favorite fast foods like ice cream, donuts and milkshakes. Her interpretation of Randy Newman's "Same Girl" is a solo performance that carries a genuine emotion. Na arranged a Korean traditional folk song on this album, and created a mass version of Kangwondo Arirang. Then she does again in her next album, Lento, with a title, "Arirang", which she performed in the closing ceremony at the Sochi Winter Olympics in 2014. Na sings in her "Song of No Regrets" with Lars Danielsson's cello. The song "Moondog" by Terry Cox contains Na's kazoo solo, Ulf Wakenius's guitar and Xavier Desandre Navarre's drum. She also shows her scat style in her song, "Breakfast in Baghdad".

Professional ratings
Review scores
Source	Rating
Discogs	3.83/5 stars
AllaboutJazz	3.5/4 stars

== Commercial performance ==
The Same Girl remains number 1 in the jazz charts in France. The album also reached to the top 40 of the pop charts. She has been awarded the French Gold Award for selling 50,000 copies. The album reached #38 in France and # 89 in Germany. She also received the ECHO, 2011 for Best International Jazz Vocalist of the Year. The Same Girl clearly got a full attention in France. She has been awarded the French Gold Award for selling 50,000 copies.

== Track listing ==
No.	Title	Writer(s)	Length
1.	"My Favorite Things"	Oscar Hammerstein II, Richard Rodgers	4:00
2.	"My Name Is Carnival"	Jackson C. Frank	4:02
3.	"Breakfast In Baghdad"	Ulf Wakenius	5:56
4.	"Uncertain Weather"	Na Yoon-Sun	3:22
5.	"Song Of No Regrets"	Lani Hall, Sergio Mendes	3:45
6.	"Kangwondo Arirang"	Trad. Korean	4:06
7.	"Enter Sandman"	Metallica	4:52
8.	"Same Girl"	Randy Newman	4:14
9.	"Moondog"	Terry Cox	4:10
10.	"Pancake"	Na Yoon Sun	3:36
11.	"La Chanson D'Hélène"	Jean Loup Dabadie, Philippe Sarde	5:07

== Personnel ==
- Na Yoon-Sun - Vocal, Producer, Singer-Songwriter, Kalimba, Kazoo
- Roland Brival - Narration Special Guest on track 11
- Lars Danielsson - Bass, Cello
- Xavier Desandre Navarre - Percussion
- Ulf Wakenius - Guitar
- Axel Matignon and Lars Danielsson - Recording producers
- Jae Jin In - Executive Producer Hub Music Inc.
