= Lucia Cadotsch =

Swiss singer with jazz background

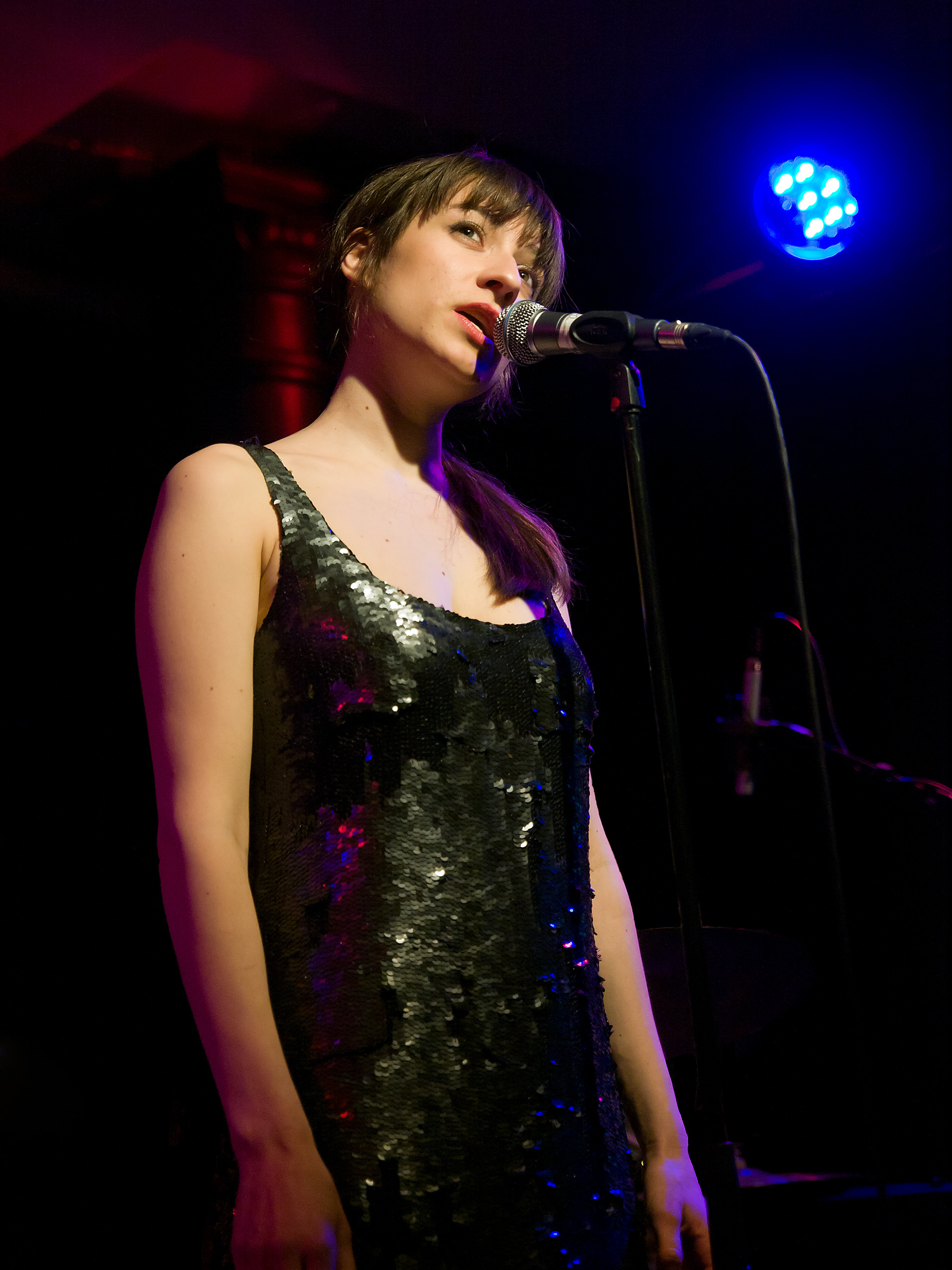
Cadotsch performing in 2011

Lucia Cadotsch Lucia Cadotsch (born 23 February 1984 in Zurich) is a Swiss vocalist, songwriter and composer based in Berlin. She performs in projects including Speak Low, AKI and LIUN + The Science Fiction Band. Cadotsch received awards including the Swiss Music Prize, the German Jazz Award and the ECHO Jazz.

== Biography ==
Lucia Cadotsch was born in Zurich, Switzerland. She studied jazz singing at the Universität der Künste Berlin and at the Rytmisk Musikkonservatorium in Copenhagen.

In the late 2000s, Cadotsch performed with the band Schneeweiss & Rosenrot, which released three albums between 2009 and 2012 and toured internationally.

In 2015, Cadotsch founded the trio Speak Low together with bassist Petter Eldh and saxophonist Otis Sandsjö. The group released three albums between 2016 and 2020 and performed internationally, including appearances at the NYC Winter Jazzfest and the London Jazz Festival.

Since 2021, Cadotsch has led the quartet AKI. The debut album AKI was released in 2023.

Together with saxophonist and producer Wanja Slavin, Cadotsch leads the project LIUN + The Science Fiction Band. The ensemble combines electronic and acoustic elements and has collaborated with larger ensembles such as the hr-Big Band and the EOS Chamber Orchestra.

She has also collaborated with musicians and ensembles including Hayden Chisholm, the Lucerne Jazz Orchestra and Yellow Bird.

== Honors ==
- 2009: Awarded the Grand Prize in the first National Singing Competition New Voices
- 2012: Recipient of the New German Jazz Prize with 'Schneeweiss & Rosenrot
- 2017: Awarded an Echo Jazz for her album Speak Low
- 2021 – German Jazz Award, Vocalist of the Year
- 2023 – Swiss Music Prize

== Discography ==
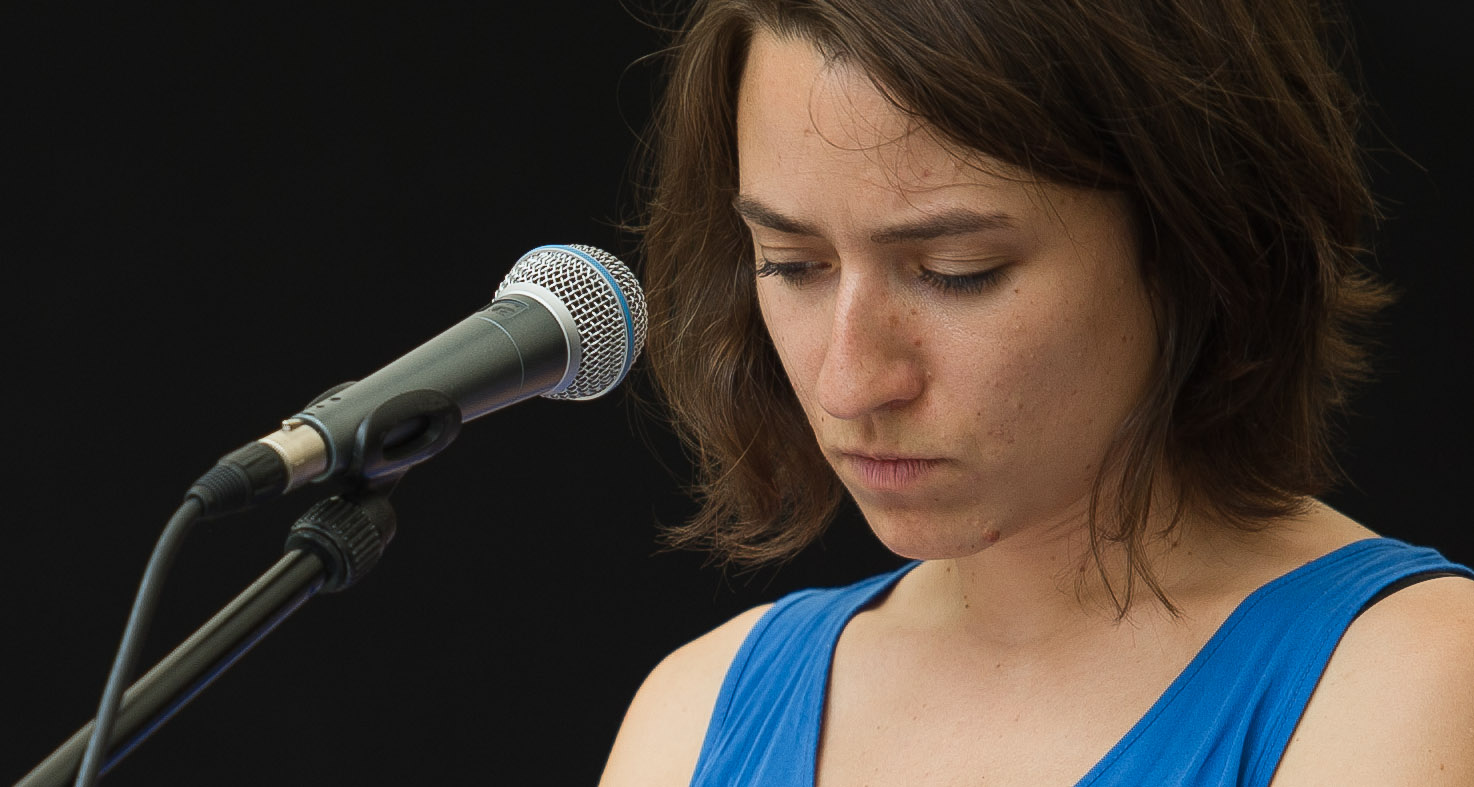
Cadotsch in 2013

=== As leader ===
- Speak Low (Enja/Yellowbird, 2016)
- Speak Low Renditions (Enja, 2019)
- LIUN + The Science Fiction Band - Time Rewind (Yellowbird, 2019)
- Speak low II (We Jazz, 2020)
- LIUN + The Science Fiction Band - Lily of the Nile (Heartcore, 2022)
- Aki (Heartcore, 2023)
- LIUN + The Science Fiction Band - Does It Make You Love Your Life? (Heartcore, 2025)

=== Collaborations ===
With Schneeweiss & Rosenrot

- Salt Crusted Dreams (Calibrated Music, 2009)
- Pretty Frank (Enja, 2011)
- Pool (Enja, 2012)

With Yellow Bird

- Sing (Enja, 2015)
- Edda Lou (Enja, 2018)

With Ronny Graupe + Kit Downes

- Newfoundland Tristesse (BMC/Galileo MC, 2025)
