= Lento (Na Yoon-sun album) =

Studio album by Na Yoon-Sun
- Released: March 12, 2013
- Recorded: 2013
- Studio: Nilento Studio (Gothenburg, Sweden)
- Genre: jazz, Contemporary Jazz, Vocal Jazz, Bop, Crossover Jazz, Latin Jazz
- Length: 45:48
- Label: ACT Music
- Producer: Na Yoon-Sun, Axel Matignon, JJ In

Na Yoon-Sun chronology
Same Girl (2010)	Lento (2013)

Professional ratings
Review scores
Source	Rating
Discogs	4.71 stars on a 5 point scale
AllaboutJazz	3.5/4 stars

Lento is the eighth studio album by South Korean jazz singer-songwriter Na Yoon-Sun, released on March 12, 2013 by ACT Music. It is the third album that Yoon-Sun and ACT Music worked on music together. After Yoon-Sun refused to contract with French record label Bleu, she had formed quintet with French accordionist Vincent Peirani, Swedish guitarist Ulf Wakenius, French percussionist Xavier Desandre-Navarre, and Swedish bassist and cellist Lars Danielsson. This quintet has been working together since 2009 when they created Yoon-Sun's sixth album Voyage.

This album's title comes from the Italian word 'lento,' which means 'performing music slowly.' Yoon-Sun wrote and produced all the songs in Lento. Most of the songs which this album contains are slowly paced. Even though she was not originally a jazz musician and had sung various types of music such and rock and classical music, she uses variety of jazz techniques or produces similar effects on Lento. In this album, she performs scat singing, creates swing feeling, and the quintet plays in A-A-B-A form in some songs while fusing those techniques with other genres.

One remarkable point other than her vocal jazz performance is her rearrangement of Korean traditional folk song "Arirang." Na Yoon-Sun sang this jazz version of "Arirang" at the Sochi Winter Olympics closing ceremony in 2014, celebrating South Korea's hosting of the next Winter Olympics.

== Commercial performance ==
Lento, after it was released, was commercially successful in several countries in Europe. It peaked at #14 in French Leschart and #70 in Switzerland. In Germany, Yoon-Sun received German Jazz Gold Award for reaching to #1 in German Chart. She also received ECHO, the German Grammy as the best international jazz singer and most sold-out album.

== Track listing ==
No.	Title	Writer(s)	Length
1.	"Lento"	Alexander Scriabin, Na Yoon-Sun	3:04
2.	"Lament"	Na Yoon-Sun	3:40
3.	"Hurt"	Nine Inch Nails	5:22
4.	"Empty Dream"	Vincent Peirani, Na Yoon-Sun	4:20
5.	"Momento Magico"	Ulf Wakenius	5:32
6.	"Soundless Bye"	Na Yoon-Sun	3:44
7.	"Full Circle"	Vincent Peirani, Na Yoon-Sun	3:36
8.	"Ghost Riders in the Sky"	Stan Jones	4:58
9.	"Waiting"	Lars Danielsson, Caecilie Norby	3:30
10.	"Arirang"	Korean traditional folk song	4:25
11.	"New Dawn"	Na Yoon-Sun	3:42

== Personnel ==
- Na Yoon-Sun – Vocal, Producer, Singer-Songwriter
- Vincent Peirani – Accordion
- Lars Danielsson – Bass, Cello
- Xavier Desandre-Navarre – Percussion
- Ulf Wakenius – Guitar
- Seung Hwan Roh – Design [Album Design]
- Lars Nilsson – Engineer
- Michael Dahlvid – Engineer [Assistant]
- JJ In – Executive-Producer
- Sung Yull Nah – Photography
- Axel Matignon – Producer
