= Émile Parisien =

French saxophonist (born 1982)

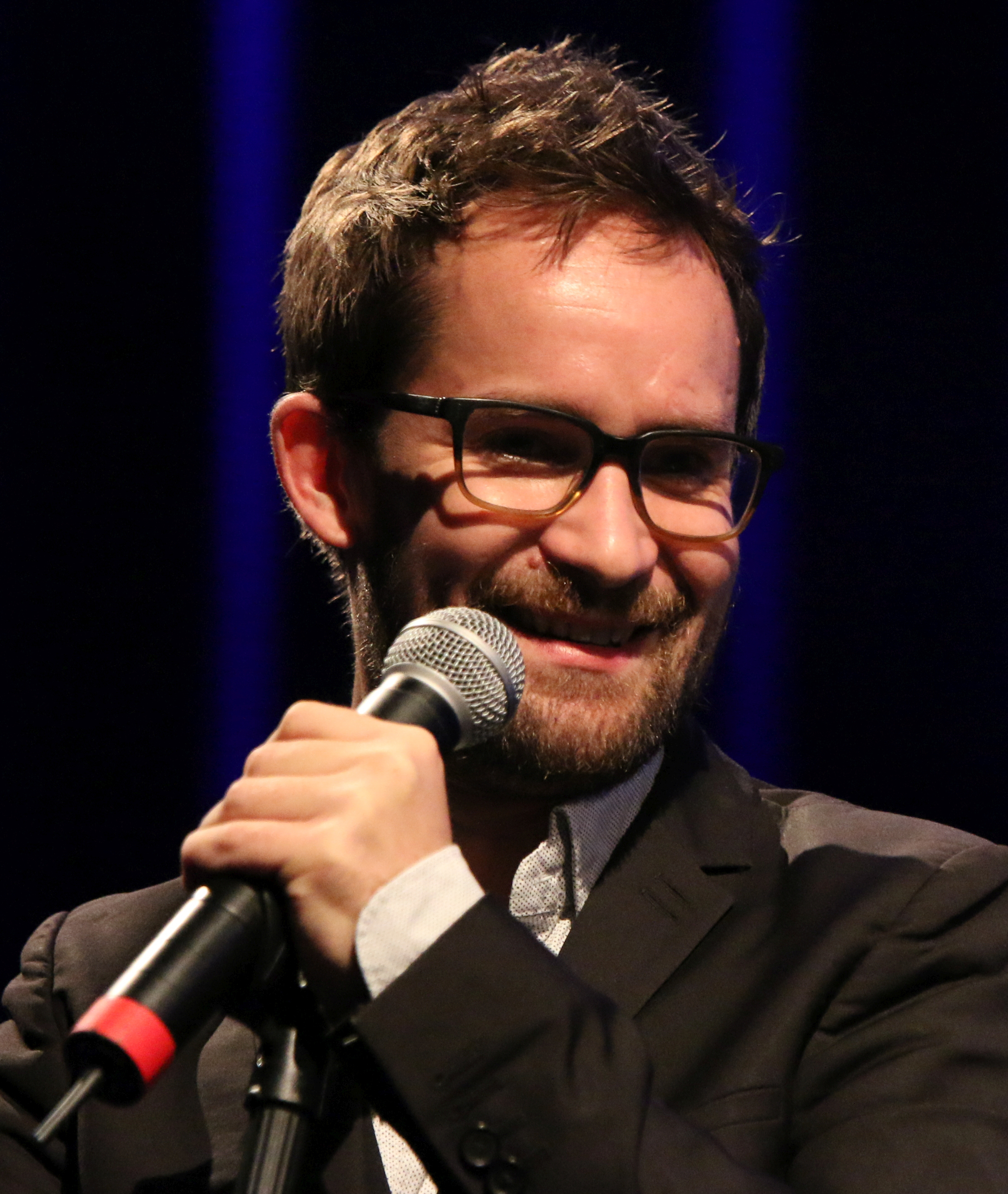
- Parisien at the Deutsches Jazzfestival in Frankfurt in 2015
- Born: 12 October 1982 (age 44); Cahors, Lot, France
- Education: Conservatoire de Toulouse
- Occupations: Musician, composer
- Awards: Echo Jazz

Émile Parisien (born 12 October 1982) is a French soprano and alto saxophonist, jazz musician, and composer.

== Career ==
Émile Parisien entered the fifth class at the age of 11 in the first class of Marciac's College de jazz, where he studied music with established musicians such as Pierre Boussaguet, Guy Lafitte and Christian "Tonton" Salut.

From 1996, he studied at the Conservatoire de Toulouse, where he also studied classical and contemporary music. During these years, he has had the opportunity to perform alongside major jazz figures such as Wynton Marsalis, Christian McBride, Johnny Griffin and Bobby Hutcherson, during the Jazz in Marciac festival.

== Influences ==
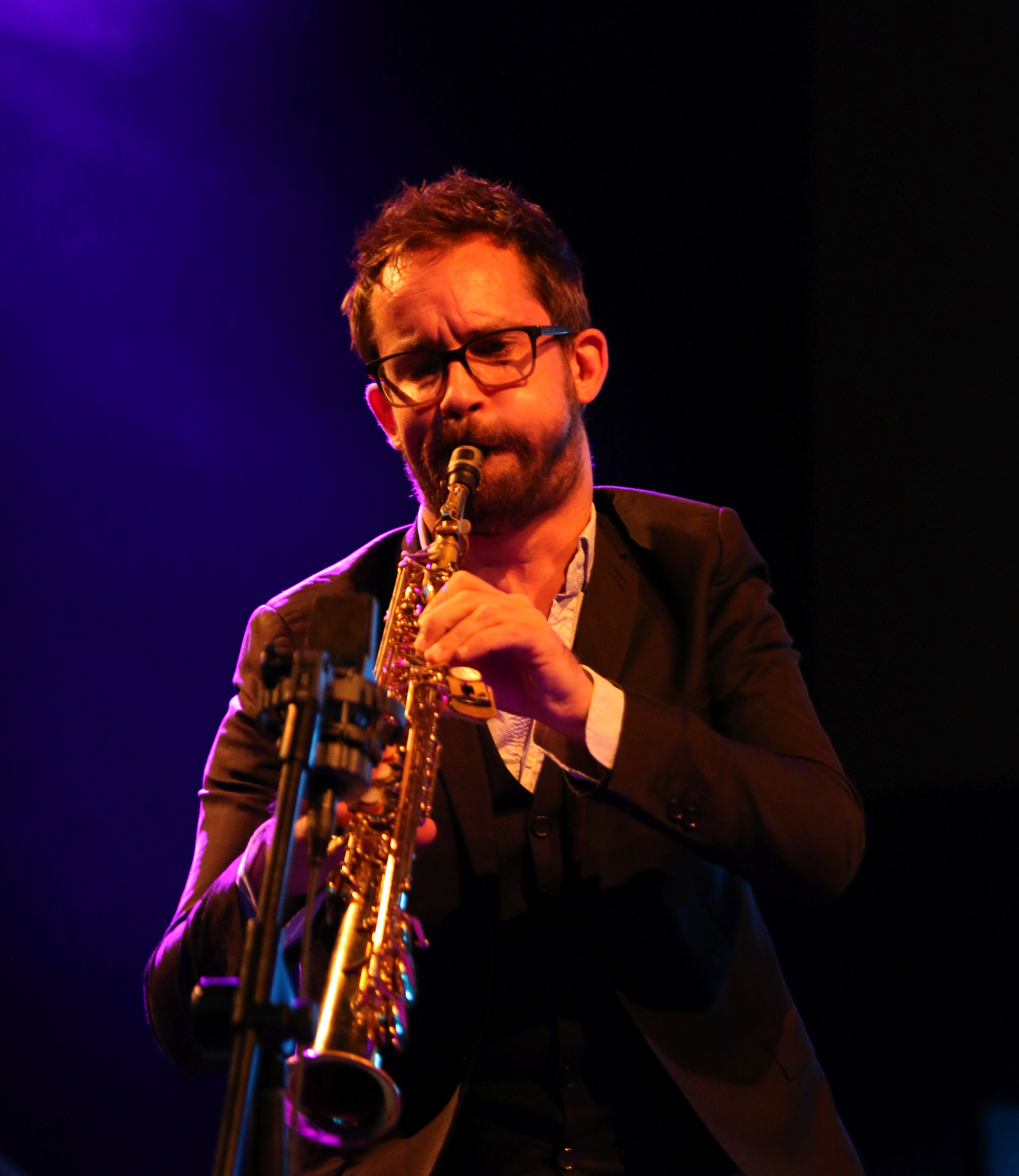
Parisien in concert, Frankfurt 2015

Parisien moved to Paris in 2000 and in 2004 founded his own quartet with Julien Touery (piano), Ivan Gélugne (double bass), and Sylvain Darrifourcq (drums). With compositions inspired by Hector Berlioz, Igor Stravinsky, Arnold Schoenberg, Richard Wagner, as well as John Coltrane and Wayne Shorter, this quartet gives an expressionist character to his music, where improvisation takes precedence.

Parisien performs in France and internationally with, among others, Michel Portal, Jacky Terrasson, Yaron Herman, Joachim Kühn, Stéphane Kerecki, John Taylor, Éric Serra, Paco Sery, Rémi Vignolo, Manu Codjia, Anne Paceo, Daniel Humair, Jean-Paul Céléa, Vincent Peirani.

== Awards ==
- June 2017 Echo Jazz (Germany), category international instrumentalist
- Artist of the year at the Victoires du Jazz 2014
- Winner of the Prix Django Reinhardt 2012 awarded 15 January 2013 by the Académie du Jazz
- Winner at the Victoires du Jazz 2009 in the Révélation Instrumentale Française de l'Année (Prix Frank Ténot) category
- In 2007, Émile Parisien is elected Talent Jazz of the Fonds d'Action Sacem for three consecutive years; with this support, the Quartet recorded two records at Laborie Jazz in 2007: Au Revoir Porc-épic, and in 2009, Original Pimpant, both unanimously hailed by generalist and specialized critics.
- Winner of the program Jazzmigration of the AFIJMA (Association des Festivals Innovants en Jazz et Musiques Actuelles) in 2009.
- Winner Jazz Primeur 2009, awarded by Culturesfrance, deputy operator of the Ministry of Foreign Affairs and the Ministry of Culture for international cultural exchanges.

== Discography ==
As leader or co-leader

- Émile Parisien Quintet: Éphémère (2000 – CD auto-produit Famimra)
- Émile Parisien 4tet: Au revoir porc-épic (2006 – Laborie (label))
- Émile Parisien 4tet: Original pimpant (2009 – Laborie)
- Émile Parisien 4tet: Chien Guêpe (2012 – Laborie)
- Émile Parisien 4tet: Spezial Snack (2014 – ACT)
- Émile Parisien and Vincent Peirani: Belle Époque (2014 – ACT)
- Émile Parisien Quintet feat. Joachim Kühn: Sfumato (2016 – ACT)
- Émile Parisien Quintet feat. Joachim Kühn: Sfumato live in Marciac (2018 – ACT)
- Émile Parisien Quartet: Double Screening (2019 – ACT)
- Émile Parisien and Vincent Peirani: Abrazo (2020 – ACT)
- Émile Parisien Sextet: Louise (2022 – ACT)
- Émile Parisien and Roberto Negro: Les Métanuits (2023 – ACT)
- Émile Parisien Quartet: Let Them Cook (2024 – ACT)

As sideman

- Daniel Humair: Sweet and Sour (2012 – Laborie)
- Jean-Paul Céléa: Yes Ornette (2012 – Out Note Records)
- Yaron Herman: Alter Ego (2012 – ACT)
- Gueorgui Kornazov 5tet: Sila (2013 – BMC)
- Hugo Carvalhais: Particula (2013 – Clean Feed Records)
- Romain Cuoq - Anthony Jambon 5tet: Awake (2013 – Cristal Records)
- Stéphane Kerecki: Nouvelle Vague (2014 – Out Note Records)
- Vincent Peirani 5tet: Living Being (2015 – ACT)
- Jan Lundgren: Into the Night (2021 – ACT)
