= Na Yoon-sun =

South Korean jazz singer (born 1969)

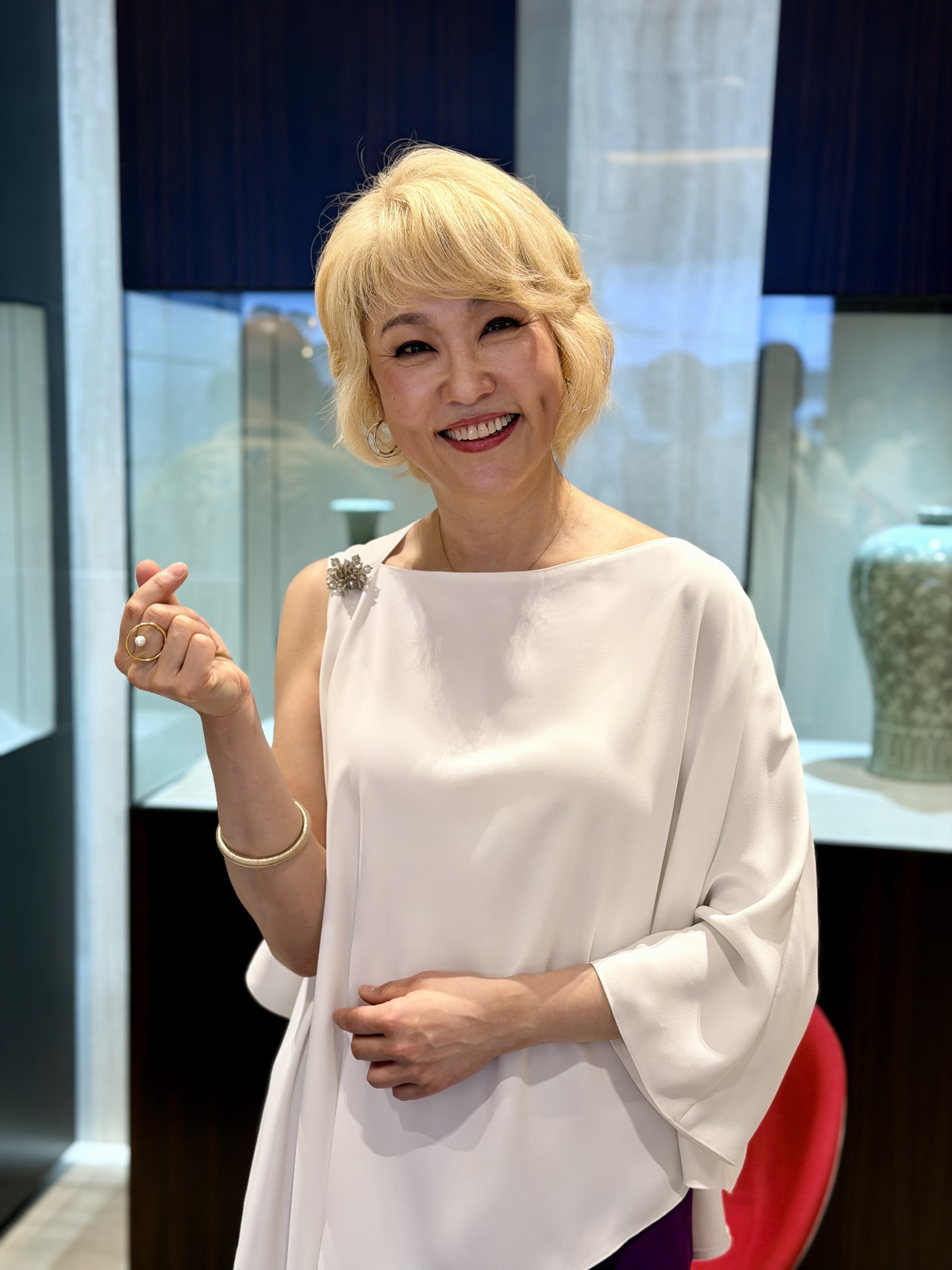
- Na Yoon-sun after a performance at the Korean Cultural Center in Budapest in June, 2026

Background information
- Born: Na Yoon-sun (나윤선); August 28, 1969 (age 57); Seoul, South Korea
- Genre: Jazz
- Occupation: Singer
- Years active: 1994–present
- Label: ACT
- Website: www.younsunnah.com

- Na Yoon-sun
- Hangul: 나윤선
- RR: Na Yunseon
- MR: Na Yunsŏn

Na Yoon-sun (Korean: 나윤선; born August 28, 1969), also known as Youn Sun Nah, is a South Korean jazz musician.

== Life and career ==
Na Yoon-sun was born on August 28, 1969, in Seoul. Her parents are musical: her father, Na Young-soo (나영수), is a conductor in Korea and her mother, Kim Mi-jung (김미정), is a musical actress. She studied French literature at Konkuk University in Korea. While she was working for a fashion company, she was scouted by Kim Min-gi (김민기), who was the president of the Hakchon Theater Company (극단 학전). There, she made her acting debut in a musical called Subway Line 1 (지하철 1호선).

Having been exposed to many kinds of music by her parents, Na decided to study and sing jazz after her performance in Subway Line 1. In 1995, she went to Paris to study jazz and chanson. There, she studied jazz at the CIM Jazz School, the National Music Institute of Beauvais, and the Nadia and Lili Boulanger Conservatory. After graduating, she taught students at the CIM Jazz School from 2000 to 2001. She formed her own quintet, YSN 5tet, and performed at various jazz clubs, theaters, festivals, and bars in France. Also in 2001 she released her debut album, Reflet. Her mostly self-composed 2002 album, Light for the people, was her first album to receive a wide distribution. She recorded the follow-up, Down by love, with guitarist Olivier Ode. With her 2004 release So I am, she became more known in Europe.

In 2007, she made a pop record, Memory Lane. In 2008, she signed a contract with German label ACT, and in 2009 was acknowledged for her musical contributions in France by receiving the distinction of the Chevaliers of the Ordre des Arts et des Lettres. She released her album Same Girl in 2010 and in 2013 this was followed by Lento. From 2009 to 2015, she gave about 500 performances in many countries, including prestigious festivals such as the Montreux Jazz Festival.

== Vocal style ==
She was not influenced by any historical jazz musicians, because she did not have any knowledge of jazz music until her late start as a singer. Even though she began studying jazz history in Paris, it was after she had already created her own vocal style. Rather, she sang various genres of music from classical music to rock music by herself before she studied jazz in Paris.

== Discography ==
=== Studio albums ===
Title	Album details	Peak chart positions							Sales
Title	Album details	KOR	AUT	BEL (Fl)	BEL (Wa)	FRA	GER	SWI	Sales
Reflet	Released: June 13, 2001; Label: Sony Music	—	—	—	—	—	—	—	
Light for the People	Released: August 31, 2002; Label: In Circum Girum	—	—	—	—	—	—	—	
Down by Love	Released: December 12, 2003; Label: Sony Music	89	—	—	—	—	—	—	KOR: 11,084
So I Am...	Released: October 19, 2004; Label: In Circum Girum, EMI	—	—	—	—	—	—	—	
Memory Lane	Released: April 10, 2007; Label: Seoul Records, Interglobal	—	—	—	—	—	—	—	KOR: 10,379
Voyage	Released: September 22, 2008; Label: Triangle, ACT Music, Interglobal	86	—	—	—	—	—		
Same Girl	Released: August 17, 2010; Label: ACT Music, Warner Music Korea	13	—	—	89	38	—	—	
Lento	Released: March 12, 2013; Label: ACT Music, Warner Music Korea	8	—	145	47	14	—	70	KOR: 6,987
She Moves On	Released: May 19, 2017; Label: ACT Music, Warner Music Korea	16	50	—	184	27	61	38	KOR: 1,309
Immersion	Released: March 8, 2019; Label: Warner Music Korea	41	—	—	—	36	—	90	
Waking World	Released: January 28, 2022; Label: Warner Music Korea	76	—	—	—	56	98	74	
Elles (with Jon Cowherd)	Released: January 26, 2024; Label: Warner Music Korea	—	—	—	—	101	—	—	
Lost Pieces	Released: February 19, 2026; Label: Warner Music Germany	—	—	—	—	107	—	—	
"—" denotes album did not chart or was not released in that region.

=== Singles ===
- "My Favorite Things" (August 10, 2010)

=== Other contributions ===
Buddha Bar Volume 5 features a song named "Road" created by Refractory (a French music group) and sung by Na Yoon-sun, under the name "Youn Sun Nah".

She appears on multiple songs of the 2011 release "Songs of Freedom" by French guitarist Nguyên Lê.

== Awards ==
Award	Year	Category	Nominee/work	Ref.
Académie du Jazz	2010	Prix du Jazz Vocal	Same Girl	
BMW Welt Jazz Award	2010	Second Prize	Na Yoon-sun	
Concours national de jazz de La Défense	1999	Special Jury Prize	Na Yoon-sun	
Echo Jazz	2011	Best International Female Singer	Na Yoon-sun	
Festival de Jazz de Montmartre	1998	Second Prize	Na Yoon-sun	
Jazz à Juan Révélations	2005	Grand Prize	Na Yoon-sun	
Korean Music Awards	2004	Best Crossover Album	Down By Love	
Korean Music Awards	2008	Netizen Vote: Jazz & Crossover Musician of the Year	Na Yoon-sun	
Korean Music Awards	2009	Best Jazz Album	Voyage	
Korean Music Awards	2011	Best Jazz Album	Same Girl	
Korean Music Awards	2014	Best Jazz Album	Lento	

=== State and cultural honors ===
Country or organization	Year	Honor	Ref.
France	2019	Officier de l'Ordre des Arts et des Lettres	
Korean Cultural Center	2013	Korean-French Culture Award	
South Korea	2012	Prime Minister's Commendation	
South Korea	2014	Sejong Cultural Award	
