= Les Yeux Noirs =

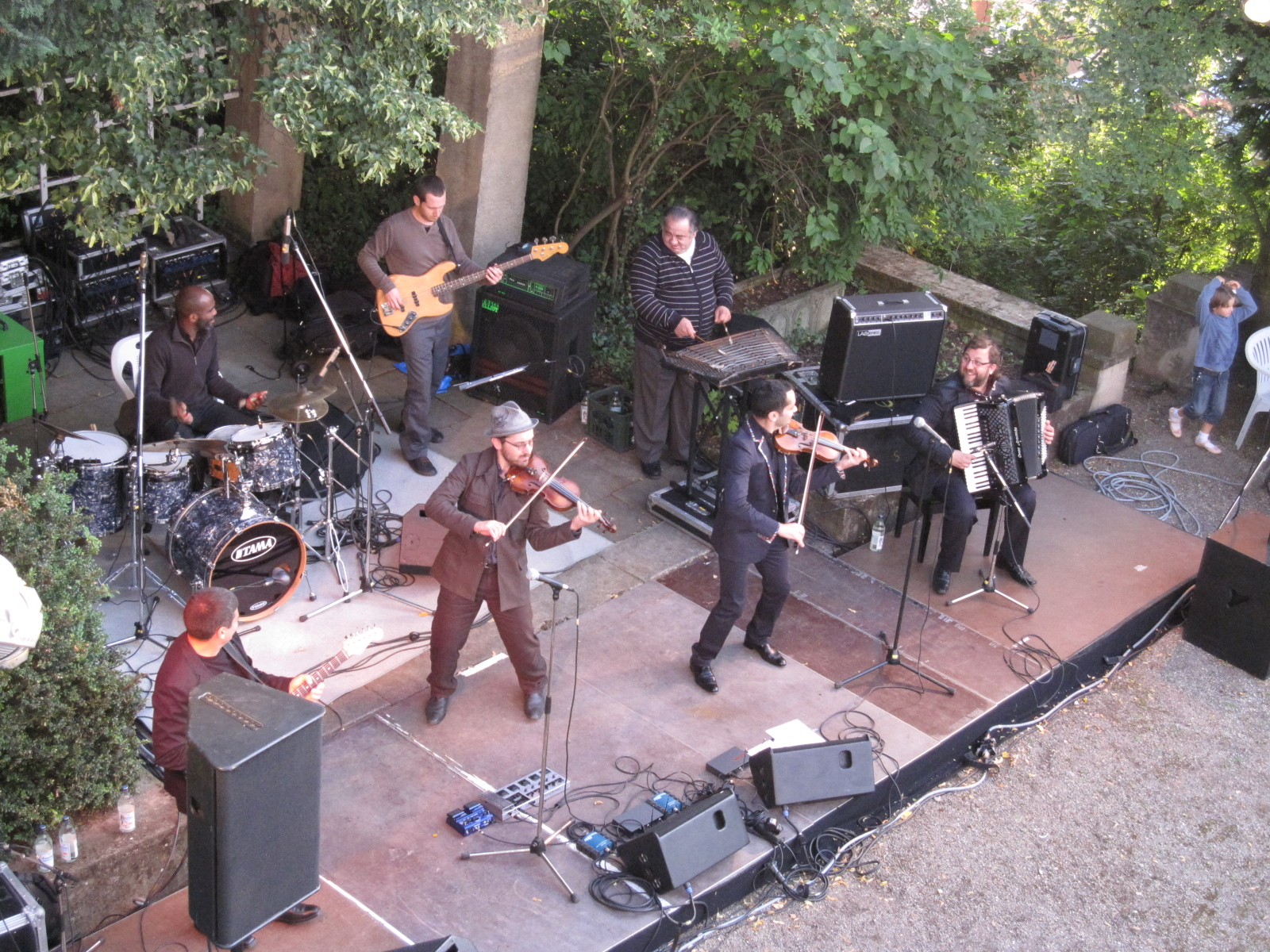
Les Yeux Noirs in Stuttgart (2009)

Les Yeux Noirs is the name of a French band combining elements of jazz manouche and other Romani music, Yiddish, and Klezmer music. The group was founded by two brothers, Eric and Olivier Slabiak, who both play violin. Other members of the band at its inception were: Franck Anastasio (double bass and electric bass), Georghe Ene (Accordion), Pascal Rondeau (guitar), and François Perchat (cello). Later, Aidje Tafial (drums) and Marian Miu (cymbalom) were added, and Georghe Ene was replaced on the accordion by Constantin Bitica.

Their music style combines traditional melodies from their many inspirations (Klezmer, Romani music, and Gypsy Jazz) as well as more modern Jazz styles. Many of their albums contain everything from a Yiddish lullaby to a rousing, dance-inspiring fusion of klezmer violin with modern sampling and Arabic drums.

Their name is taken from a 19th Century tune generally described (inaccurately) as a Russian Gypsy song, made popular by Django Reinhardt among many others.

== Discography ==
- A band of Gypsies, 1992 (Buda/Mélodie).
- Suites, 1994 (Buda/Mélodie).
- Izvoara, 1997 (EMI/Odéon).
- Balamouk, 2000 (EMI/Odéon).
- Live, 2002 (EMI/Odéon).
- tChorba, 2004 (Les Yeux Noirs/Recall).
- tiganeasca 2010
