= Echo Jazz =

German music prize

The Echo Jazz (stylized as ECHO JAZZ) was a German music prize, an Echo Music Prize for personalities and production of jazz. It was awarded annually by the Deutsche Phono-Akademie between 2010 and 2018.

The awards had been given in 30 categories, including ensemble of the year, male and female singer of the year, record label, and lifetime achievement. In 2012, the criteria for entry included album release date and "two outstanding reviews from music journalists." Conductor Claus Ogermann was given the ECHO Jazz Lifetime Achievement Award in 2012. Awards were decided by a 12-member jury based on critical and commercial appeal.

Echo Jazz was disestablished in 2018.

== Jury ==
- Christiane Böhnke-Geisse
- Ralf Dombrowski
- Stefan Gerdes (NDR)
- Thomas Glagow (C.A.R.E. Music Group)
- Bernd Hoffmann (WDR)
- Karsten Jahnke (Karsten Jahnke Konzertdirektion)
- Astrid Kieselbach (Universal Music)
- Siegfried Loch (ACT Music)
- Stefanie Marcus (Traumton Records & Jazz- & World Partner)
- Wilma Rehberg (Sony Music)
- Matthias Winckelmann (Enja Records)

== Winners ==
=== 2017 ===
International Winners

- Ensemble: Branford Marsalis Quartet, Upward Spiral, (Okeh/Sony Music)
- Singer: Norah Jones, Day Breaks, (Blue Note/Universal Music)
- Instrumentalists
  - Piano/keyboards: Kenny Barron, Book Of Intuition, (Impulse/Universal Music)
  - Saxophone/woodwinds: Émile Parisien, Sfumato, ACT Music
  - Drums/percussion: Antonio Sanchez, The Unity Sessions, (Nonesuch/Warner Music)
  - Brass: Cuong Vu, Cuong Vu Trio Meets Pat Metheny, (Nonesuch/Warner Music)
  - Guitar: Charlie Hunter, Everybody Has A Plan Until They Get Punched In The Mouth, (Ground Up/Universal Music)
- Bestseller: Singer Gregory Porter, Take Me To The Alley, (Blue Note/Universal Music)

National Winners

- Ensemble: Joachim Kühn New Trio, Beauty & Truth, ACT Music
- Singer: Lucia Cadotsch, Speak Low, yellowbird
- Instrumentalists
  - Piano/keyboards: Michael Wollny, Tandem, ACT Music
  - Saxophone/woodwinds: Daniel Erdmann, Daniel Erdmann's Velvet Revolution, BMC
  - Drums/percussion: Diego Piñera, My Picture, Octason Records
  - Bass/bass guitar: Eva Kruse, On The Mo, Redhorn Records
  - Bass: Lars Danielsson, Sun Blowing, ACT Music
  - Brass: Frederik Köster, Canada, Traumton Records
  - Guitar: Arne Jansen, Nine Firmaments, Traumton Records
  - Special instruments: Vincent Peirani, Tandem, Act Music
- Large ensemble: Marius Neset & London Sinfonietta, Snowmelt, ACT Music
- Newcomer: Anna-Lena Schnabel, Books, Bottles & Bamboo, enja
- Special awards: Arne Reimer for American Jazz Heroes, E.S.T. Symphony

== See also ==
- Echo Klassik
