= Yaron Herman =

Israeli jazz pianist

Yaron Herman ירון הרמן
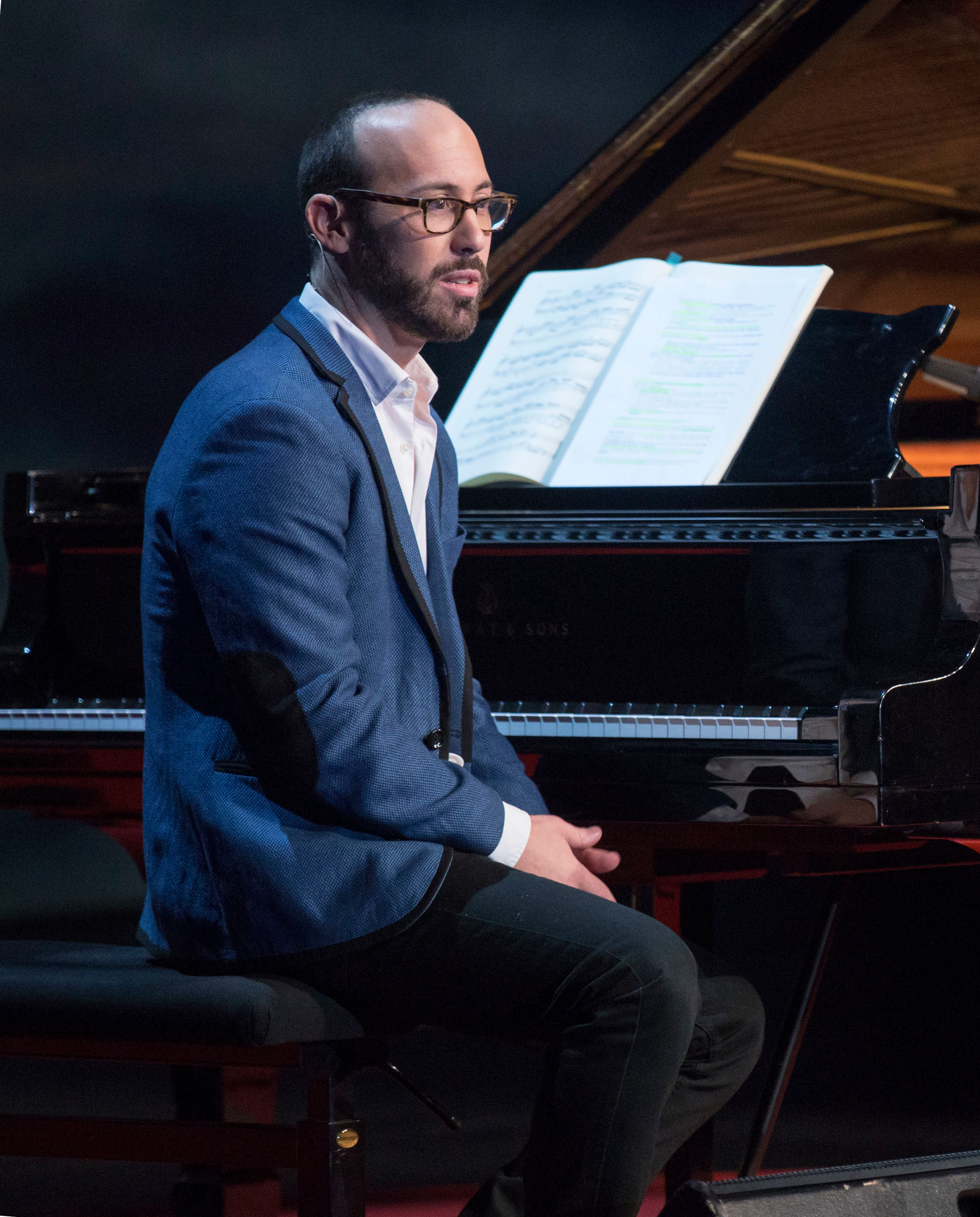

Background information
- Born: 12 July 1981 (age 44); Tel-Aviv, Israel
- Genres: Jazz
- Occupation: Musician
- Instrument: Piano
- Website: Official website

Yaron Herman (Hebrew: ירון הרמן; born 12 July 1981) is a French-Israeli jazz pianist living in Paris. He began playing the piano at the age of 16.

== Discography ==
=== As leader/co-leader ===
Year recorded	Title	Label	Personnel/Notes
2003?	Takes 2 to Know 1	Sketch	Duo, with Sylvain Ghio (drums, percussion)
2006	Variations	Laborie	Solo piano
2006?	Suite Elegiaque		As Newtopia Project
2007	A Time for Everything	Laborie	Trio, with Matt Brewer (bass), Gerald Cleaver (drums)
2009	Muse	Sunnyside	Most tracks trio, with Matt Brewer (bass), Gerald Cleaver (drums); some tracks with Quatuor Ebene String Quartet added
2010	Follow the White Rabbit	ACT	Trio, with Chris Tordini (bass), Tommy Crane (drums)
2012	Alter Ego	ACT	Quintet, with Emile Parisien (tenor sax, soprano sax), Logan Richardson (alto sax), Stephane Kerecki (bass), Ziv Ravitz (drums)
2015	Everyday	Blue Note	With Ziv Ravitz (drums), Helgi Jónsson (vocals)
2017	Y	Blue Note	
2019	Songs of The Degrees	Decca Records	Trio

=== As sideman ===
- Baldych, Adam (2014). "The New Tradition". ACT Music. Archived from the original on 2015-10-02.
- Miller, Dominic (2012). "5th House". Q-rious Music.
