= Preis der deutschen Schallplattenkritik =

The Preis der deutschen Schallplattenkritik ("German Record Critics' Award") was established in Germany in 1963 by publisher Richard Kaselowsky with the aim of setting the "most rigorous standards for supreme achievement and quality" in the field of music recording. Later on, it became closely linked to the German music industry's Deutsche Phono-Akademie e.V.; however, in 1980, the entire jury cut these ties and became an independent association. In 1988, in order to remain independent from commercial interests of the music industry, the jury officially registered as a non-profit organization, Preis der deutschen Schallplattenkritik e.V. (PdSK e.V.).

In 2019 the German Record Critics' Award Association integrates 160 members who are actively involved in the assessment of recorded music and audio books, irrespective of format or medium (vinyl record, CD, DVD, download or streaming). Their mission is to provide producers, composers, artists and music lovers with an honest guide to new releases of true artistic significance.

To this end the association has established 32 juries, each one with five jurors, who cover a broad scope of musical genres: from opera and chamber music via jazz and rock to hiphop and heavy metal (see below). Each quarter of the year every one of these 32 juries nominates up to 15 productions which were released during the previous three months. These nominations cover a wide range of performers and works, newcomers and established artists, and they may include bestsellers as well as rare gems and little-known discoveries. All these nominees form the long-list for the "Quarterly Critics' Choice" (Bestenliste).

The jury panel consists of music critics, writers, musicologists and editors from Germany, Austria, and Switzerland. The members give their time voluntarily, alongside their professional jobs. They broadcast for public, private or online internet radio, they write for newspapers and specialized magazines, they do research on music history or work as DJs. They are not allowed to judge productions they were involved in.

A core value of the prize is its strict policy to keep its decisions unswayed by commercial interests. The Association is supported by the German Minister of State for Culture and the Media. In January 2018 the PdSK e.V. moved its office from Bonn to Berlin, into the "Maison de France" on Kurfürstendamm.

The Preis der deutschen Schallplattenkritik is open to all productions and formats, regardless of the record company's size or country.

In addition to the "Quarterly Critics' Choice" (Bestenliste), once a year the Preis der deutschen Schallplattenkritik honors ten outstanding productions with "Annual Awards“ (Jahrespreise) as well as three artists and producers for their special achievements with "Certificates of Honor" (Ehrenurkunden).

The "Quarterly Critics' Choice" (Bestenliste) is widely regarded as a guide to the best new releases, which are outstanding either for their quality of interpretation or creativity, or for their value to the repertoire. Productions are eligible in the following 32 categories:

1. Symphonic and Orchestral Music
2. Concertos
3. Chamber Music
4. Piano Music
5. Harpsichord and Organ Music
6. Opera I (up to 1800)
7. Opera II (Beethoven and later)
8. Choral (with and without orchestra)
9. Baroque and Pre-Baroque Music
10. Lieder and Vocal Recital
11. Historical Recordings
12. Contemporary Classical Music
13. Film Music
14. Spoken Word and Cabaret
15. Rock
16. Pop
17. Alternative
18. German language Singer/Songwriters
19. Folk and Singer/Songwriters
20. Traditional Ethnic Music
21. World Music
22. Jazz (traditional)
23. Jazz (Swing / Modern)
24. Blues and Blues-related
25. R&B, Soul & HipHop
26. Recordings for Children and Youth
27. DVD Productions (Opera & Ballet / Classical Music / Non-Classical)
28. DVD Jazz (concerts, documentaries)
29. Crossover Productions
30. Hard & Heavy
31. Club & Dance
32. Electronic & Experimental

== See also ==
- Diapason d'Or
- Echo (music award)
- Gramophone Award
- Grand Prix du Disque
