= List of UK Jazz & Blues Albums Chart number ones of 2024 =

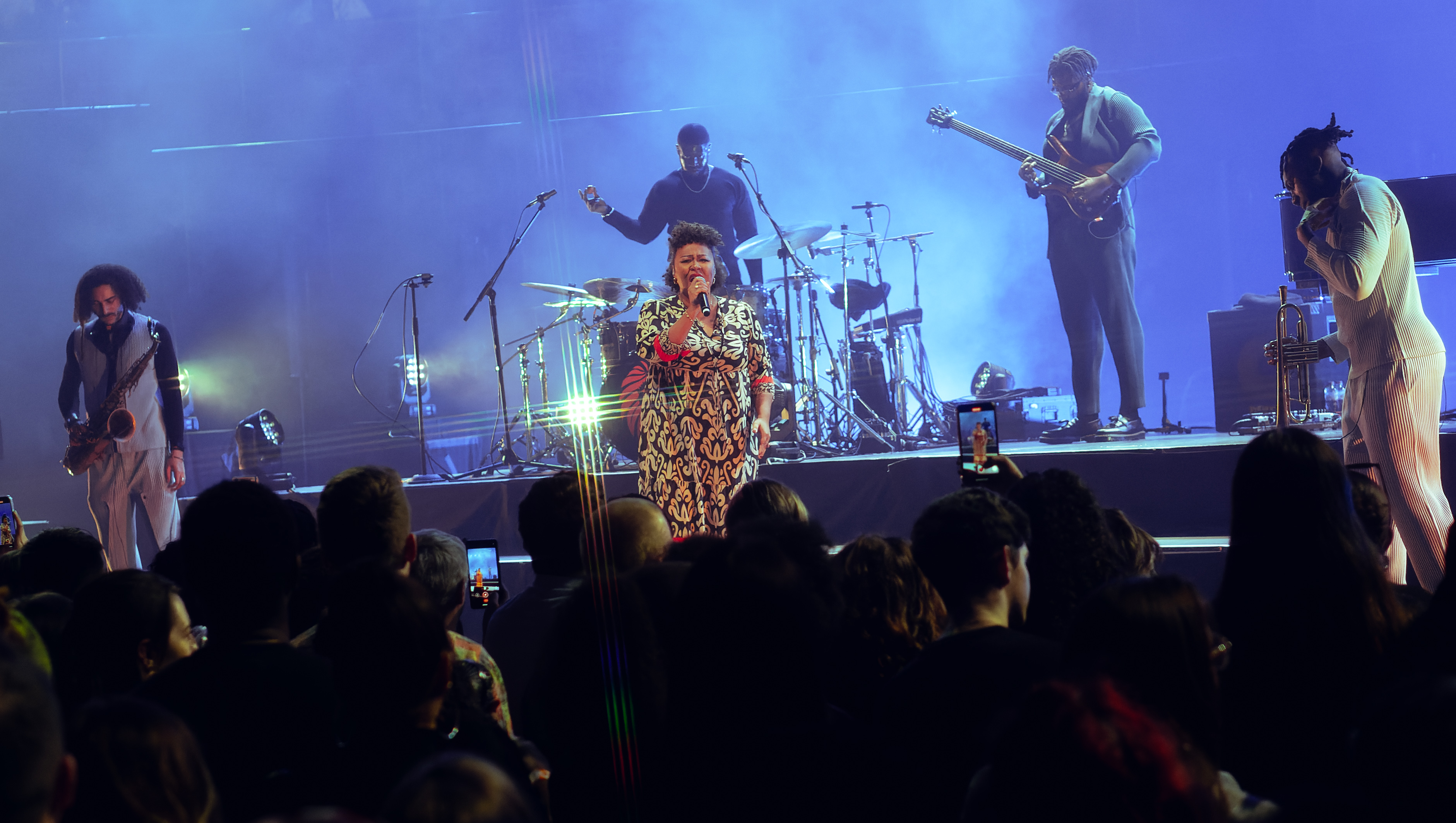
Ezra Collective spent twelve weeks at number one on the UK Jazz & Blues Albums Chart during 2024: nine with Dance, No One's Watching and three with Where I'm Meant to Be.

The UK Jazz & Blues Albums Chart is a record chart which ranks the best-selling jazz and blues albums in the United Kingdom. Compiled and published by the Official Charts Company, the data is based on each album's weekly physical sales, digital downloads and streams. In 2024, 52 charts were published with 30 albums at number one. The first number-one album of the year was Ezra Collective's second studio album Where I'm Meant to Be, which topped the first three charts of 2024. The last number-one album of the year was the follow-up Dance, No One's Watching, which spent the last three weeks of the year at number one.

The most successful album on the UK Jazz & Blues Albums Chart in 2024 was Dance, No One's Watching, which spent a total of nine weeks at number one. Kind of Blue by Miles Davis was the second most-successful album of the year, spending seven non-consecutive weeks atop the chart. Slash was number one for four weeks with Orgy of the Damned, Elles Bailey spent three weeks at number one (one with Live at the Fire Station and two with Beneath the Neon Glow), and Laufey and Kamasi Washington each spent two weeks atop the chart, with second album Bewitched and fifth album Fearless Movement, respectively.

== Chart history ==
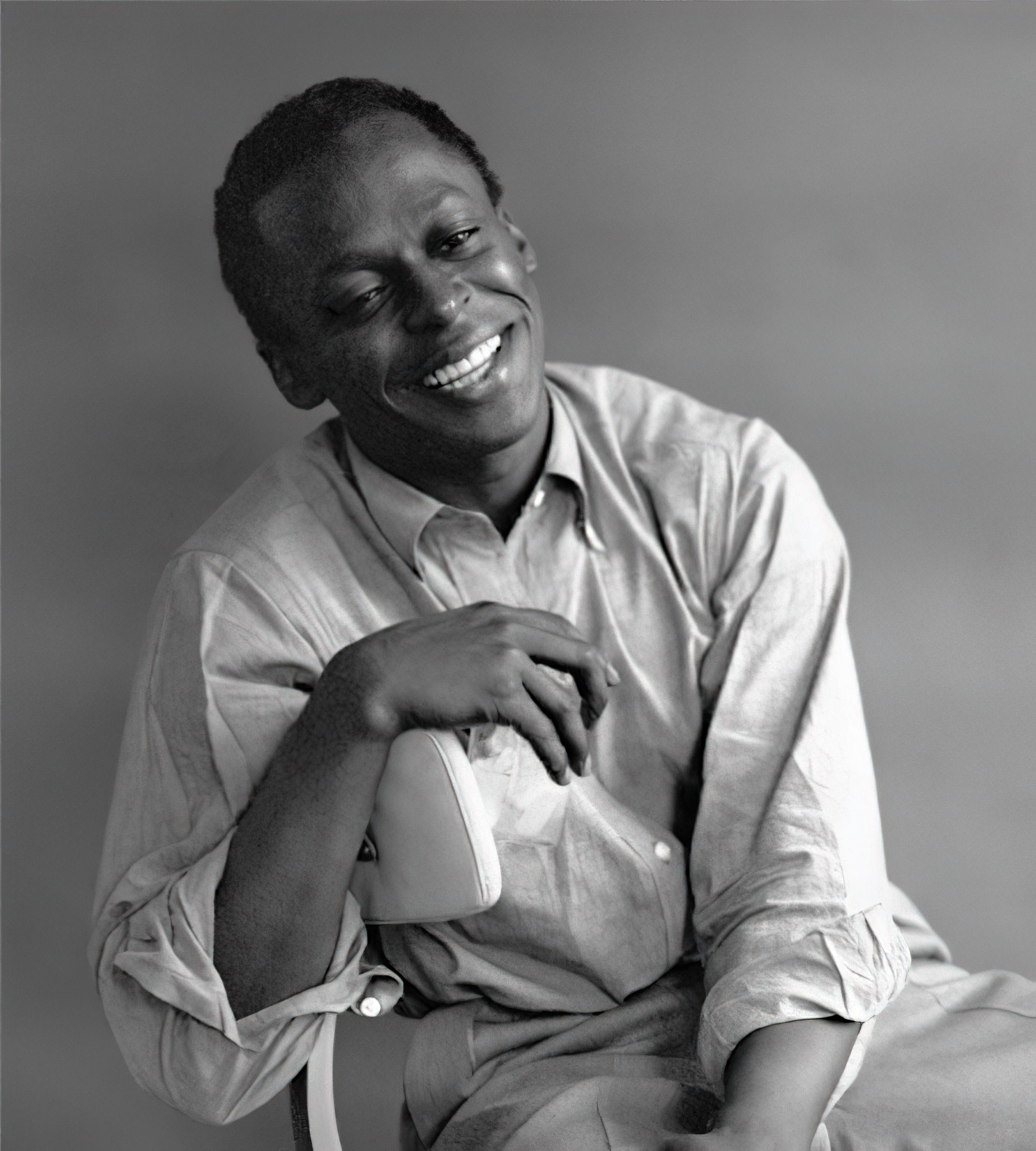
Kind of Blue by Miles Davis spent another seven weeks atop the UK Jazz & Blues Albums Chart in 2024.

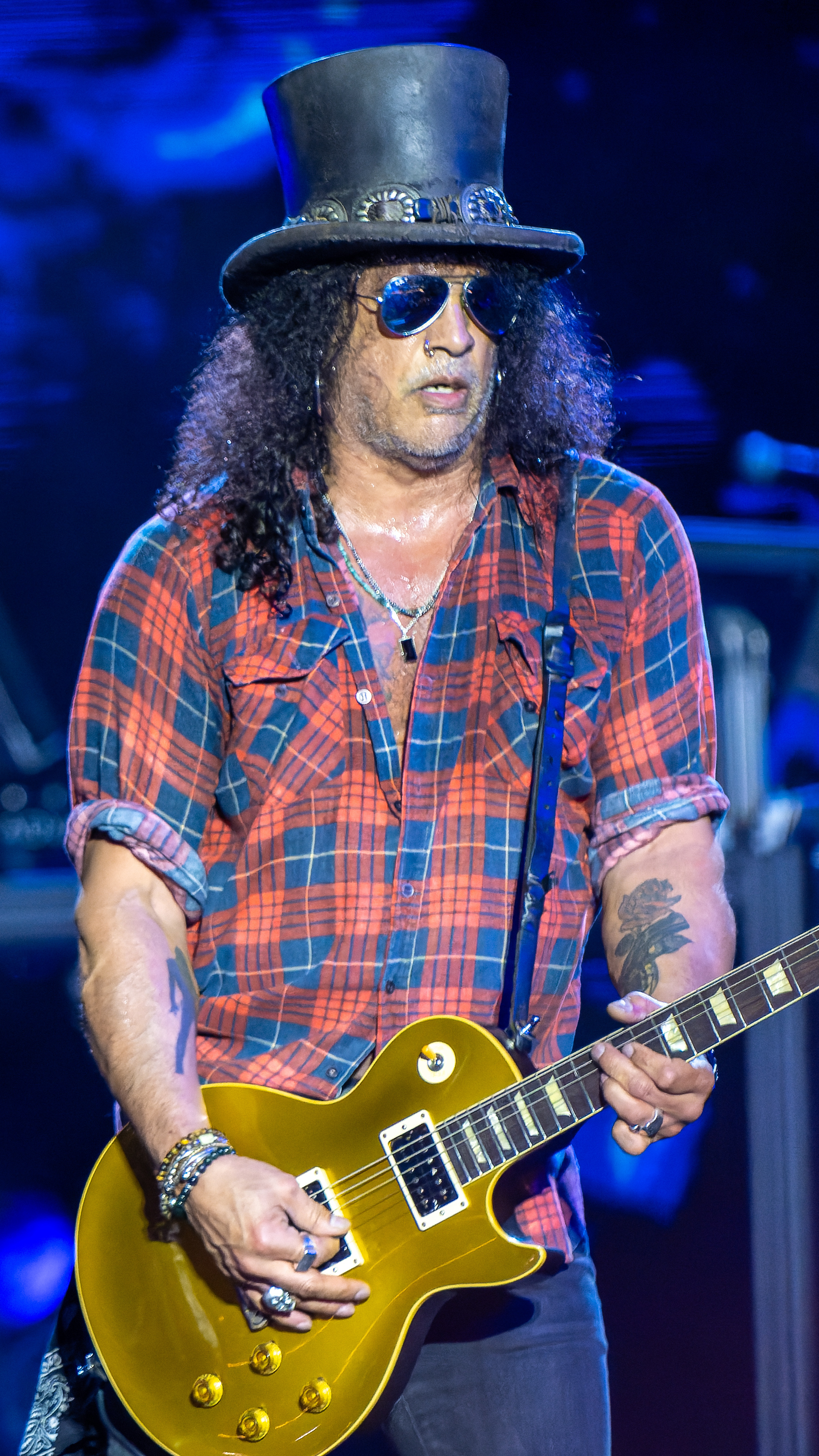
Slash was number one for four weeks with Orgy of the Damned.

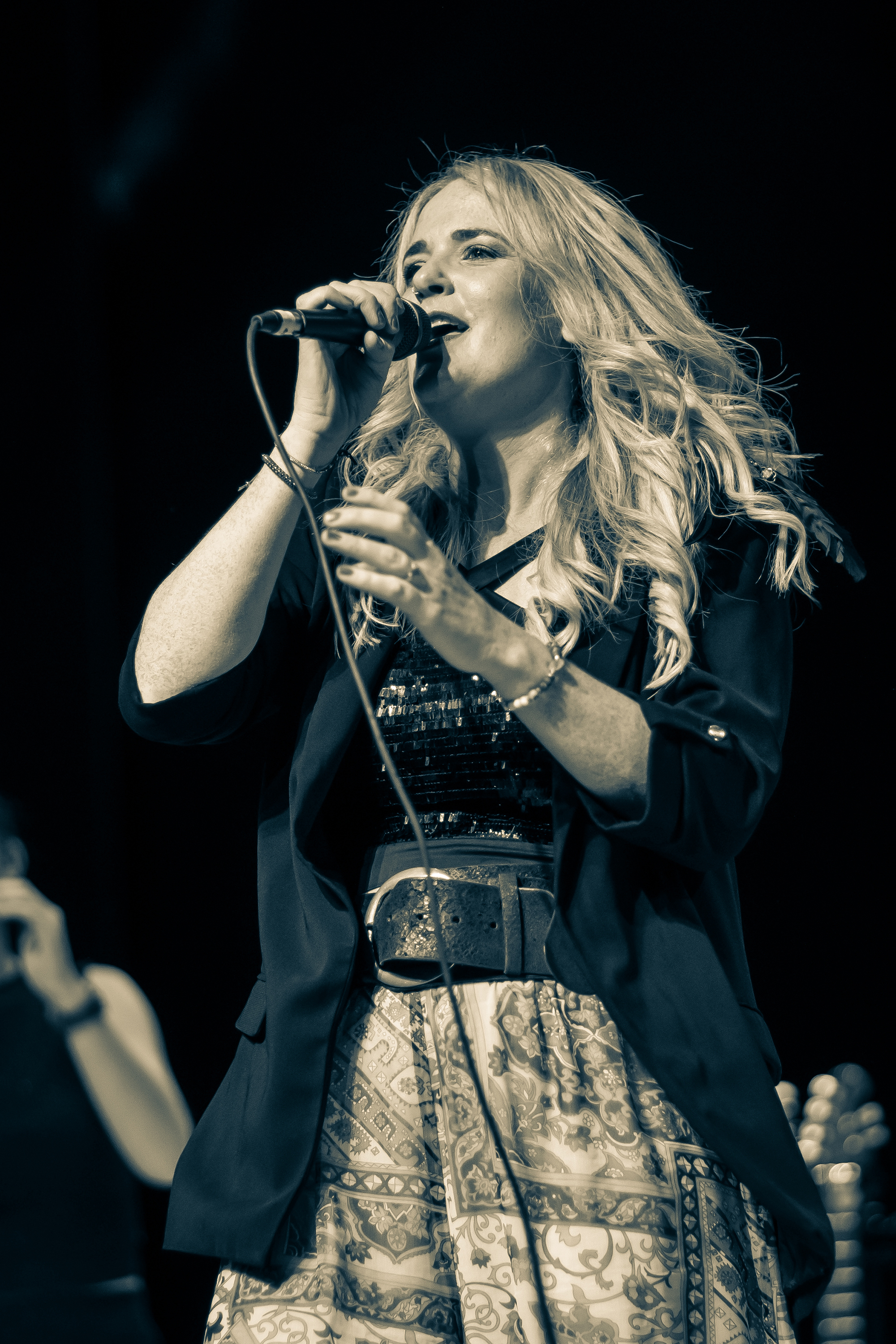
Elles Bailey spent two weeks atop the chart with Beneath the Neon Glow and a third with Live at the Fire Station.

Issue date	Album	Artist(s)	Record label(s)	Ref.
5 January	Where I'm Meant to Be	Ezra Collective	Partisan	
12 January	Where I'm Meant to Be	Ezra Collective	Partisan	
19 January	Where I'm Meant to Be	Ezra Collective	Partisan	
26 January	Kind of Blue	Miles Davis	Columbia	
2 February	Kind of Blue	Miles Davis	Columbia	
9 February	Frank	Amy Winehouse	Island	
16 February	Kind of Blue	Miles Davis	Columbia	
23 February	Kind of Blue	Miles Davis	Columbia	
1 March	Kind of Blue	Miles Davis	Columbia	
8 March	Broken	Walter Trout	Provogue	
15 March	Visions	Norah Jones	EMI	
22 March	Live at the Fire Station	Elles Bailey	Outlaw	
29 March	Just Something	Dee C. Lee	Acid Jazz	
5 April	Kind of Blue	Miles Davis	Columbia	
12 April	Something in the Room She Moves	Julia Holter	Domino	
19 April	Perceive Its Beauty, Acknowledge Its Grace	Shabaka	Impulse!	
26 April	Breakers of Chains Tour Live	When Rivers Meet	One Road	
3 May	Bewitched	Laufey	AWAL	
10 May	Fearless Movement	Kamasi Washington	Young	
17 May	Fearless Movement	Kamasi Washington	Young	
24 May	Orgy of the Damned	Slash	Gibson	
31 May	Orgy of the Damned	Slash	Gibson	
7 June	Night Reign	Arooj Aftab	Verve	
14 June	A Trip a Stumble a Fall Down on Your Knees	Seasick Steve	SO	
21 June	Orgy of the Damned	Slash	Gibson	
28 June	Live at the Hollywood Bowl with Orchestra	Joe Bonamassa	Provogue	
5 July	Love Heart Cheat Code	Hiatus Kaiyote	Brainfeeder	
12 July	Orgy of the Damned	Slash	Gibson	
19 July	To Save a Child: An Intimate Live Concert	Eric Clapton	Bushbranch/Surfdog	
26 July	Kind of Blue	Miles Davis	Columbia	
2 August	MoonDial	Pat Metheny	Modern	
9 August	A Hard Road	John Mayall & the Bluesbreakers	Decca	
16 August	Beneath the Neon Glow	Elles Bailey	Cooking Vinyl	
23 August	Beneath the Neon Glow	Elles Bailey	Cooking Vinyl	
30 August	How Long Has This Been Going On	Paul Carrack	Carrack	
6 September	Halfway Somewhere	Galliano	Brownswood	
13 September	Endlessness	Nala Sinephro	Warp	
20 September	Slang Spirituals	Lady Blackbird	BMG	
27 September	Odyssey	Nubya Garcia	Concord Jazz	
4 October	Dance, No One's Watching	Ezra Collective	Partisan	
11 October	Dance, No One's Watching	Ezra Collective	Partisan	
18 October	Harlequin	Lady Gaga	Polydor	
25 October	Dance, No One's Watching	Ezra Collective	Partisan	
1 November	You Still Got Me	Beth Hart	Provogue	
8 November	Bewitched	Laufey	AWAL	
15 November	Dance, No One's Watching	Ezra Collective	Partisan	
22 November	Dance, No One's Watching	Ezra Collective	Partisan	
29 November	Dance, No One's Watching	Ezra Collective	Partisan	
6 December	Live in London '24	When Rivers Meet	One Road	
13 December	Dance, No One's Watching	Ezra Collective	Partisan	
20 December	Dance, No One's Watching	Ezra Collective	Partisan	
27 December	Dance, No One's Watching	Ezra Collective	Partisan	

== See also ==
- 2024 in British music
