= List of UK Jazz & Blues Albums Chart number ones of 2023 =

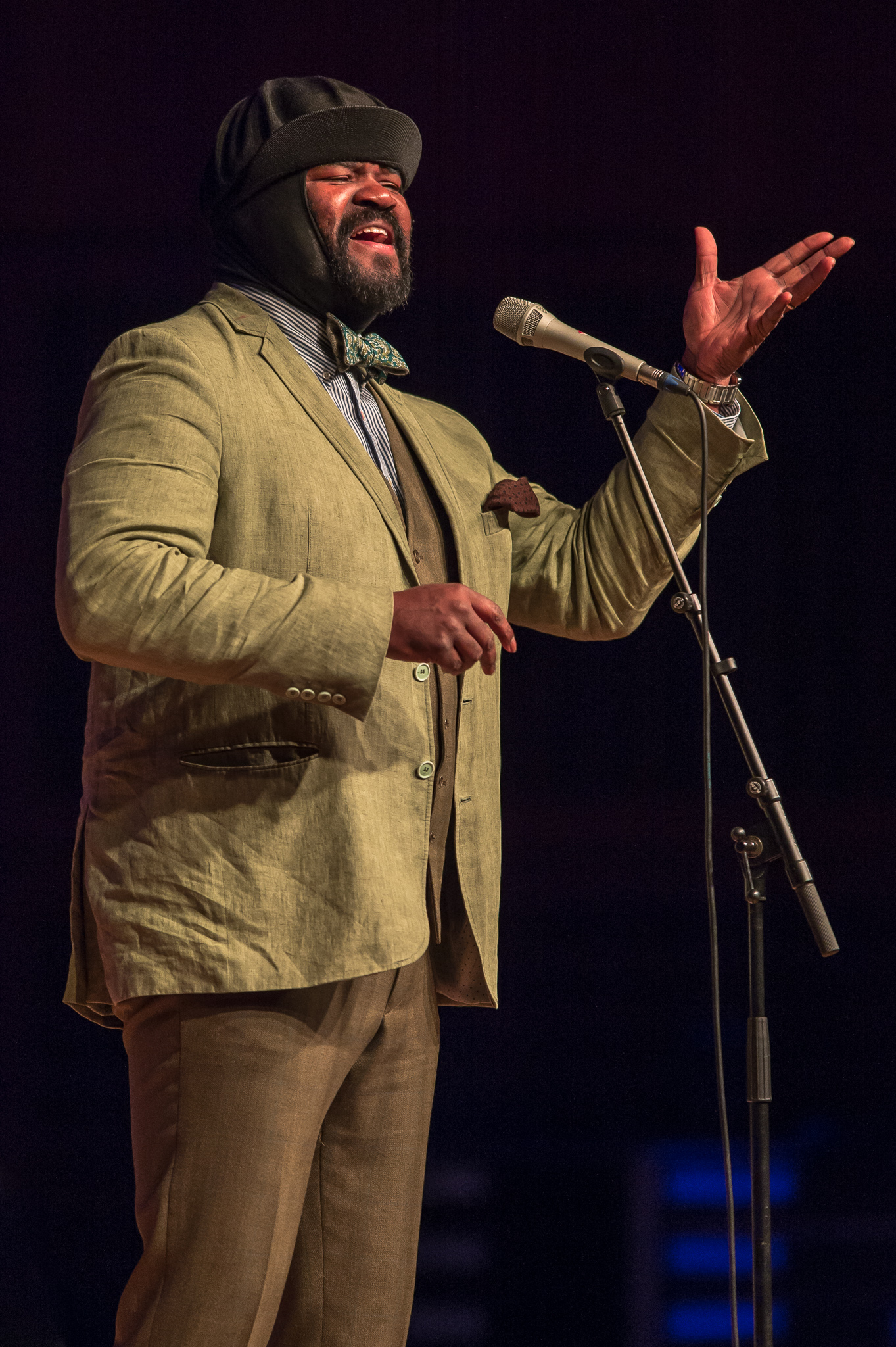
Gregory Porter spent the last eight weeks of 2023 at number one on the UK Jazz & Blues Albums Chart with his seventh studio album, Christmas Wish.

The UK Jazz & Blues Albums Chart is a record chart which ranks the best-selling jazz and blues albums in the United Kingdom. Compiled and published by the Official Charts Company, the data is based on each album's weekly physical sales, digital downloads and streams. In 2023, 52 charts were published with 27 albums at number one. The first number-one album of the year was Ezra Collective's second studio album Where I'm Meant to Be, which topped the first three charts of 2023. The last number-one album of the year was Christmas Wish, the seventh studio album by Gregory Porter, which spent the last eight weeks of 2023 atop the chart.

The most successful album on the UK Jazz & Blues Albums Chart in 2023 was Christmas Wish, which spent the longest spell of the year atop the chart. Where I'm Meant to Be was the second most successful album of the year, spending a total of seven weeks at number one over three separate spells. Lady Blackbird's debut album Black Acid Soul was number one for a total of four weeks, while Joe Bonamassa also spent four weeks at number one with two releases for two weeks each: live album Tales of Time followed by studio album Blues Deluxe Vol. 2. Miles Davis spent three weeks atop the chart with returning number one Kind of Blue.

== Chart history ==
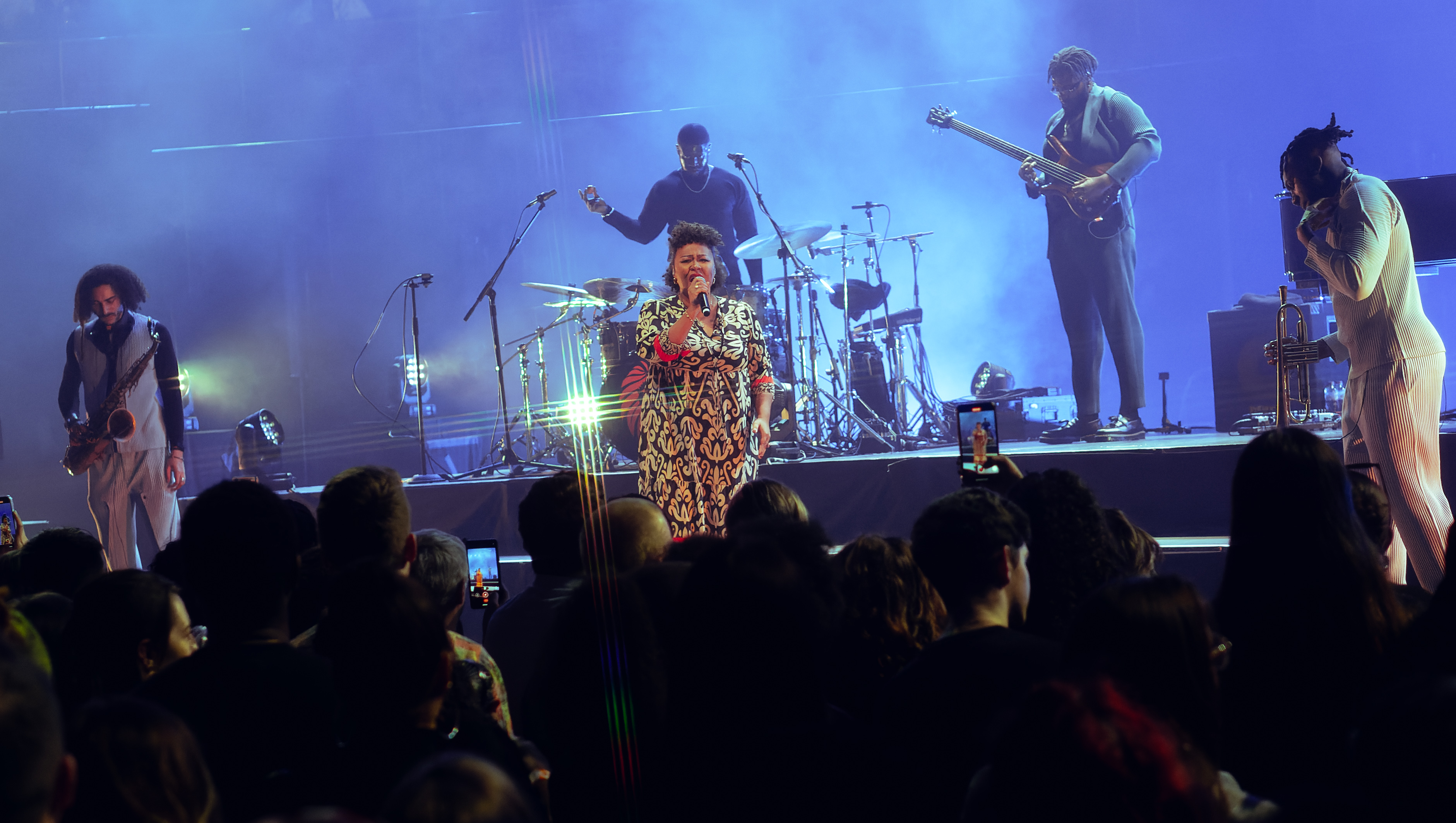
The Ezra Collective spent seven weeks at number one in 2023 with their second studio album, Where I'm Meant to Be.

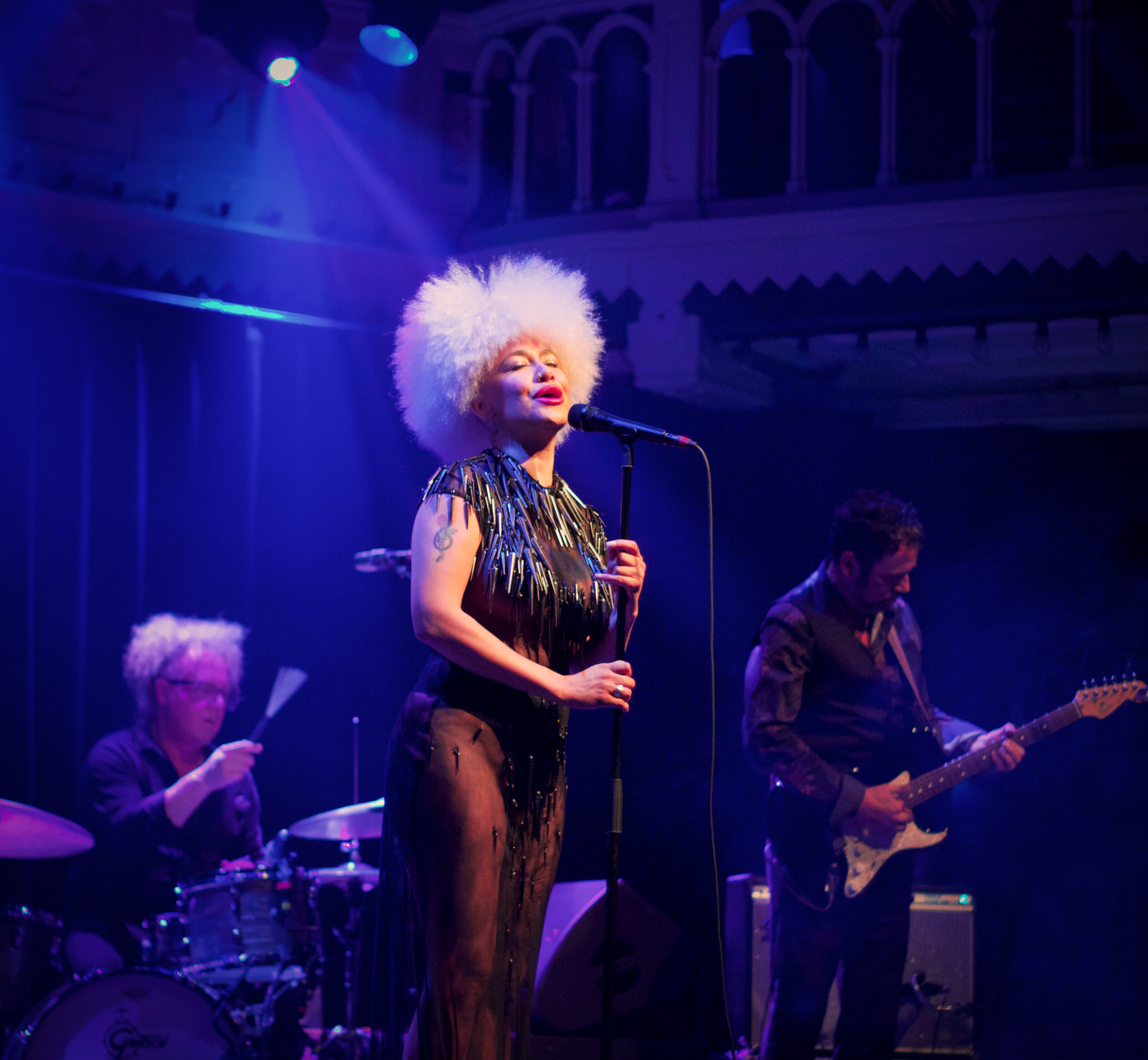
Lady Blackbird spent four weeks in early 2023 at number one with her debut studio album, Black Acid Soul.

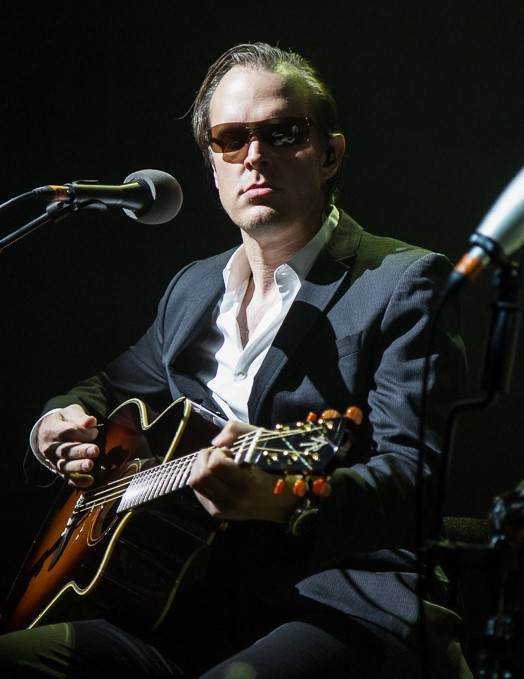
Joe Bonamassa was also number one for four weeks in 2023, spending two weeks each atop the chart with Tales of Time and Blues Deluxe Vol. 2.

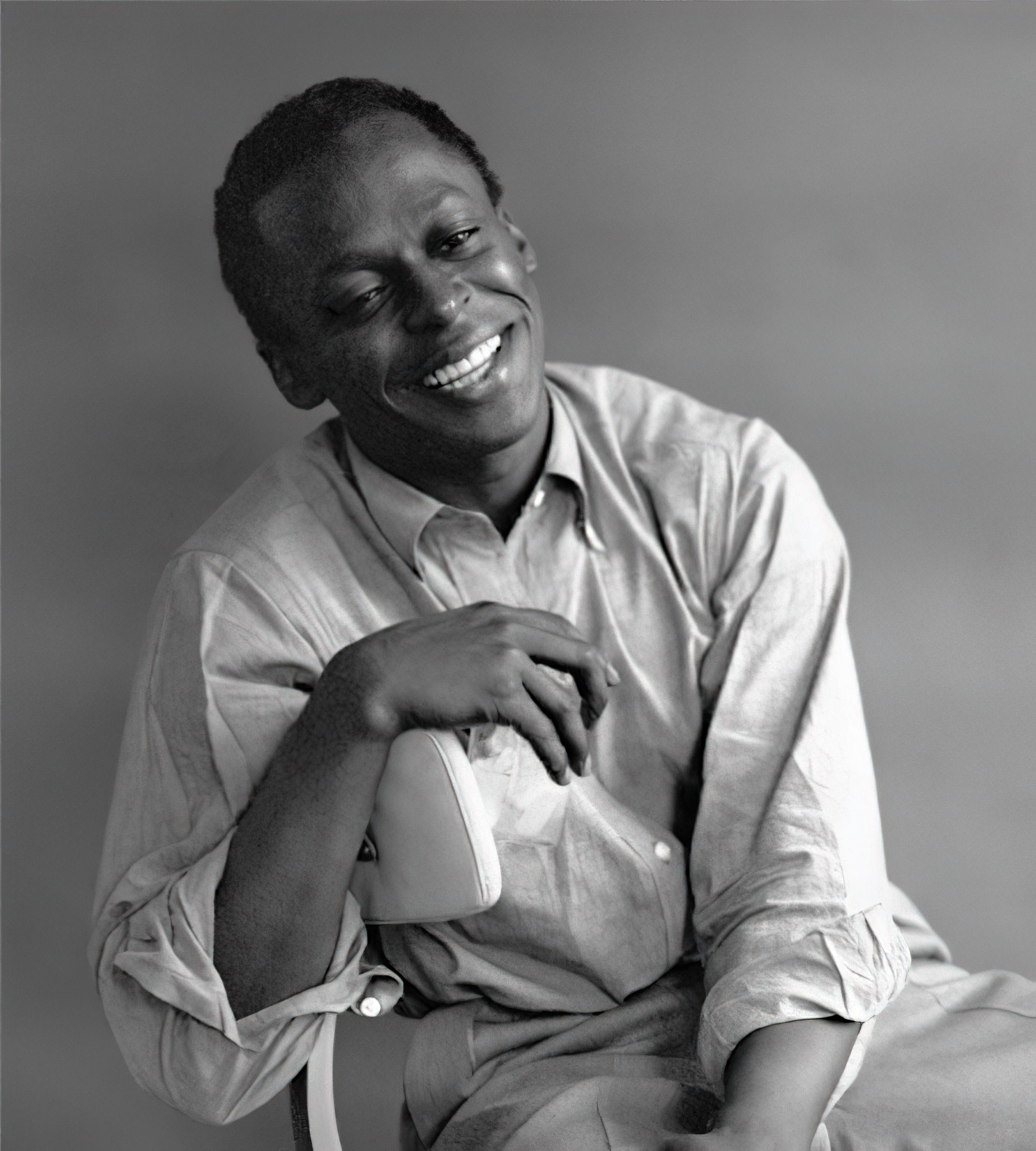
Kind of Blue by Miles Davis spent three weeks at number one in 2023.

Issue date	Album	Artist(s)	Record label(s)	Ref.
6 January	Where I'm Meant to Be	Ezra Collective	Partisan	
13 January	Where I'm Meant to Be	Ezra Collective	Partisan	
20 January	Where I'm Meant to Be	Ezra Collective	Partisan	
27 January	Cabaret at the Kit Kat Club	original cast recording	Decca	
3 February	Cabaret at the Kit Kat Club	original cast recording	Decca	
10 February	Black Acid Soul	Lady Blackbird	BMG	
17 February	Your Mother Should Know	Brad Mehldau	Nonesuch	
24 February	Black Acid Soul	Lady Blackbird	BMG	
3 March	Black Acid Soul	Lady Blackbird	BMG	
10 March	Linger Awhile	Samara Joy	Verve	
17 March	Black Acid Soul	Lady Blackbird	BMG	
24 March	Linger Awhile	Samara Joy	Verve	
31 March	Plays Well with Others	Jeff Goldblum, The Mildred Snitzer Orchestra	Decca	
7 April	Gift from the Trees	Mammal Hands	Gondwana	
14 April	Flang Dang	Andy Fairweather Low	TLMC	
21 April	Tales of Time	Joe Bonamassa	Provogue	
28 April	Variables	Alfa Mist	Anti-	
5 May	Pieces of Treasure	Rickie Lee Jones	BMG	
12 May	Tales of Time	Joe Bonamassa	Provogue	
19 May	Voice Notes	Yazmin Lacey	Own Your Own	
26 May	Death Wish Blues	Samantha Fish, Jesse Dayton	Rounder	
2 June	Death Wish Blues	Samantha Fish, Jesse Dayton	Rounder	
9 June	The Very Best of Glenn Miller	Glenn Miller	Sony	
16 June	Kind of Blue	Miles Davis	Columbia	
23 June	The Winding Way	The Teskey Brothers	Decca	
30 June	The Winding Way	The Teskey Brothers	Decca	
7 July	Anthology	Charlie Watts	BMG	
14 July	All Around Man: Live in London	Rory Gallagher	Universal	
21 July	Evenings at the Village Gate	John Coltrane, Eric Dolphy	Impulse!	
28 July	Love for Sale	Tony Bennett, Lady Gaga	Interscope	
4 August	Evenings at the Village Gate	John Coltrane, Eric Dolphy	Impulse!	
11 August	Ride into the Light	Robert Jon & the Wreck	Journeyman	
18 August	Kind of Blue	Miles Davis	Columbia	
25 August	Kind of Blue	Miles Davis	Columbia	
1 September	Bad Luck & the Blues	Laurence Jones	Marshall	
8 September	Where I'm Meant to Be	Ezra Collective	Partisan	
15 September	Black Classical Music	Yussef Dayes	Brownswood	
22 September	Where I'm Meant to Be	Ezra Collective	Partisan	
29 September	Where I'm Meant to Be	Ezra Collective	Partisan	
6 October	Where I'm Meant to Be	Ezra Collective	Partisan	
13 October	Blues Deluxe Vol. 2	Joe Bonamassa	Provogue	
20 October	Aces Are High	When Rivers Meet	One Road	
27 October	Blues Deluxe, Vol. 2	Joe Bonamassa	Provogue	
3 November	Bewitched	Laufey	AWAL	
10 November	Christmas Wish	Gregory Porter	Decca	
17 November	Christmas Wish	Gregory Porter	Decca	
24 November	Christmas Wish	Gregory Porter	Decca	
1 December	Christmas Wish	Gregory Porter	Decca	
8 December	Christmas Wish	Gregory Porter	Decca	
15 December	Christmas Wish	Gregory Porter	Decca	
22 December	Christmas Wish	Gregory Porter	Decca	
29 December	Christmas Wish	Gregory Porter	Decca	

== See also ==
- 2023 in British music
