= David Mrakpor =

British musician

David Mrakpor (born c. 1994) is a London-based multi-instrumentalist, performing on keyboards, bass, guitar, drums and vibraphone.

David Mrakpor is part of Blue Lab Beats, as “Mr DM” and won a Grammy Award in 2022 for music production on Angelique Kidjo's Mother Nature LP (Best Global Music Album). They won The Innovation Award at Jazz FM Awards 2022, were nominated for Best Jazz Act at MOBO Awards 2021 and are signed to Blue Note Records. The single “Pineapple” has been streamed over ten million times on Spotify.

David Mrakpor has released singles under his own name on the Jazz re:freshed label, including “My Life (feat James Coleman)” and “Lonely”. He is credited as a performer or producer with multiple artists including Joe Armon-Jones, Nubya Garcia, Moses Boyd, Kojey Radical and Ultra Nate.

Mrakpor began playing musical instruments from the age of three years old and as a teenager attended Tomorrow's Warriors and WAC Arts in London, where he met Blue Lab Beats collaborator NK-OK (Namali Kwaten). Mrakpor gained a degree in Jazz Studies from Middlesex University. He is a regular on London’s “jazz jams” scene, including at Orii Jam and Troy and has headlined shows at Ronnie Scott's Jazz Club. J Dilla and Milt Jackson are cited as influences, as well as Thelonious Monk and Herbie Hancock.

Mrakpor plays vibraphone in Brown Penny, a six-piece band led by Mercury-nominated Cassie Kinoshi, and in trumpeter Mark Kavuma’s The Banger Factory, featuring a solo on a track titled “Mrakpor”. He plays keyboards in JD3 and in Jon Onabowu Quartet.

The winner of the Live category at the Abbey Road Studios Music Photography Awards in 2022 was John Lyons' photograph of Mrakpor playing drums.
