= Dark Matter (Moses Boyd album) =

Studio album by Moses Boyd
- Released: 14 February 2020
- Studio: Metropolis Studios, London
- Genre: Jazz
- Length: 50:16
- Label: Exodus
- Producer: Moses Boyd (exec.); Koyejo Oloko (also exec.)

Moses Boyd chronology
Displaced Diaspora (2018)	Dark Matter (2020)

Singles from Dark Matter
- 1. "Stranger Than Fiction" Released: 23 October 2019; 2. "Only You" Released: 27 November 2019; 3. "Shades of You" Released: 9 January 2020

Dark Matter is the debut solo studio album by British jazz musician Moses Boyd. Boyd released it independently on 14 February 2020 under his own label, Exodus Records. The album was his third-ever solo project, following Absolute Zero (2017) and Displaced Diaspora (2018). Dark Matter was met with widespread critical acclaim upon release and was later nominated for the Mercury Prize.

== Background and recording ==
Boyd explained to Apple Music that the record "isn’t meant to be a negative record; it's meant to unify, to make people think.” On the inspiration and motive behind the record's title, he told The Fader:

I'm very into space. I remember watching a program and they were talking about dark matter and this invisible substance that no one really knows much about, but accounts for so much. They say they estimate 80 percent of our universe is dark matter. I was like, "Oh wow, there's this invisible thing that is so important, but no one can really explain or define it." And then in all that was going on around the world, it was like, "It's all this darkness, but in a weird way, if I pick a random person on the street and started talking to them, there's something that unifies us in this darkness." They equally think this is terrible, but there's some sort of positive in that, because there's two people now that think this is terrible. But there's hope.

== Composition ==
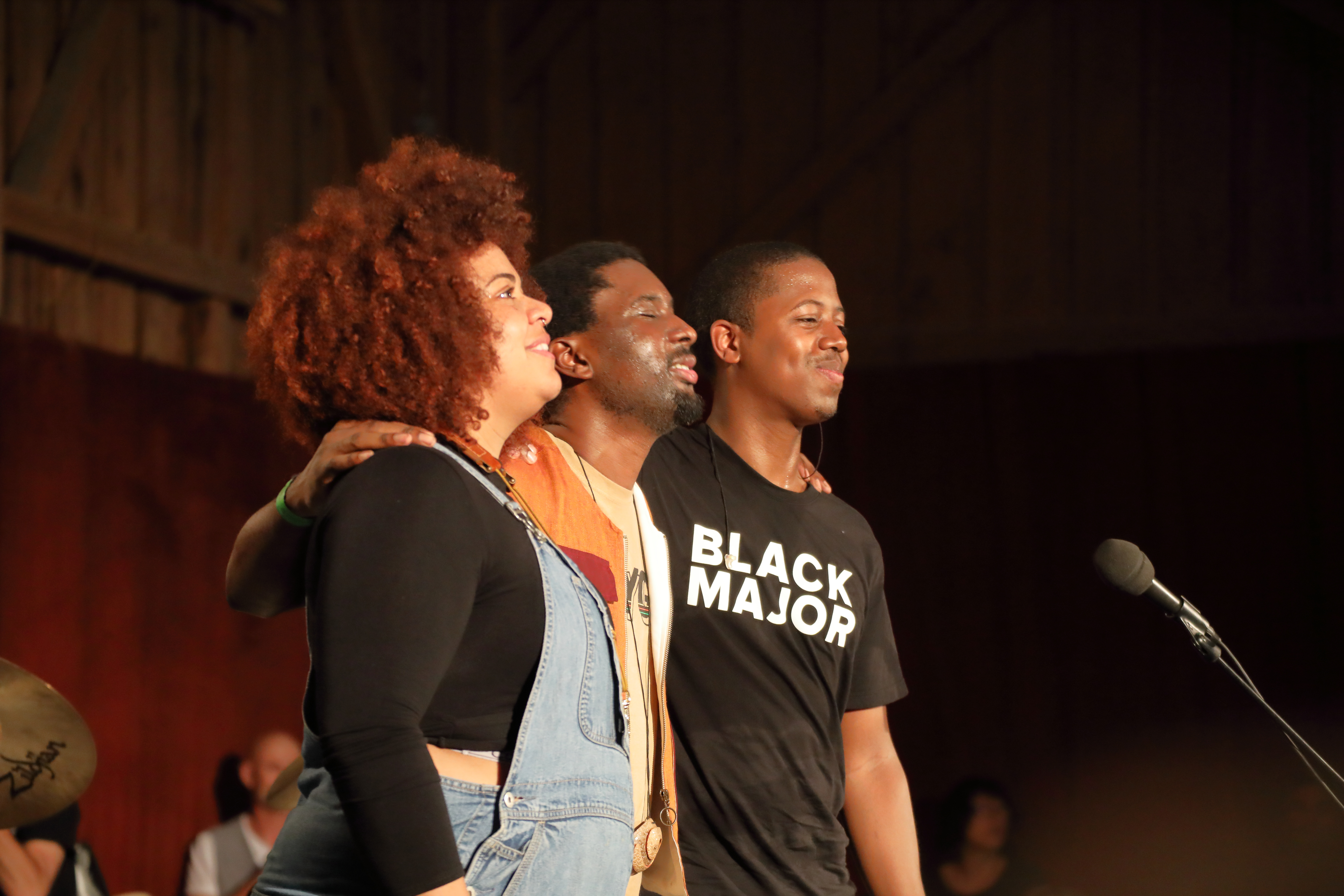
Boyd (right) collaborates with Chelsea Charmichael (left) on saxophone and Theon Cross (middle) on tuba on Dark Matter

Musically, Dark Matter is a jazz record with elements of electronica, dance, jazz fusion, grime, and rock. Piotr Orlov of Afropunk additionally highlighted the record's influences of afro-pop and afrobeats. Elizabeth Aubrey of NME described the record as a "melting-pot of genres and styles where complex jazz rhythms sit alongside [the aforementioned genres]", stressing that "whilst its head leans towards the mathematical with its polymath rhythms and intricate structures, its heart is firmly on the dancefloor." Bryan Hahn of The Fader confirmed that on the album, Boyd "ignored expectations and rules, blending genres, freshly recorded sounds, and emotions."

== Release and promotion ==
Despite releasing the album's lead single "Stranger Than Fiction" on 23 October 2019, Boyd only announced the album with the release of the second single, "Only You" on 27 November 2019. The album's third and final single, "Shades of You" was released on 9 January 2020.

== Critical reception ==
Professional ratings
Aggregate scores
Source	Rating
AnyDecentMusic?	7.8/10
Metacritic	83/100
Review scores
Source	Rating
Clash	8/10
Exclaim!	7/10
The Guardian	4/5 stars
The Line of Best Fit	8/10
NME	4/5 stars
The Observer	4/5 stars
Q	4/5 stars
Mojo	4/5 stars
Uncut	4/5 stars
The Wire	4/5 stars

Dark Matter received positive acclaim from music critics. At Metacritic, which assigns a normalized rating out of 100 to reviews from professional publications, the album received an average score of 83, based on 11 reviews. Album of the Year collected 12 reviews and calculated an average of 79 out of 100. Aggregator AnyDecentMusic? gave it 7.8 out of 10, based on their assessment of the critical consensus.

Elizabeth Aubrey of NME described Dark Matter as "an ambitious work full of scope, where Boyd continues to innovate and impress." Andy Cowan of Mojo described the album as a "vivid, diverse debut", and described Boyd as "ridiculously gifted". John Lewis of Uncut wrote, "This is not pastiche or revival — this is jazz created in a distinctly London accent; the sounds you hear in cars and minicabs, the fractured beats you hear pouring out of teenagers’ phones — refracted through the prism of jazz." Dhruva Balram of DJ Mag wrote that Dark Matter possesses a "jazz-kissed effect", while noting that Boyd blends in elements of reggae, dub, dancehall, drum and bass, techno, house and garage "remarkably well". He concluded, "Deftly, it sounds like an ode to the various genres that the UK can claim and champion." Crack Magazine wrote "Producer albums can often be noodly, navel-gazing affairs… this isn’t one of those." Liam Martin of AllMusic concluded that Dark Matter "cements [Boyd] as one of the most exciting jazz musicians of his generation."

== Accolades ==
=== Rankings ===
Critics' rankings of Dark Matter
Publication	List	Rank	Ref.
Clash	The 25 Best Albums Of 2020 So Far	—N/a	
NME	NME's Best Albums of 2020... So Far	14	
NPR	NPR Music's 25 Favorite Albums Of 2020 (So Far)	—N/a	

=== Awards ===
Awards for Dark Matter
Year	Organization	Award	Result	Ref.
2020	AIM Independent Music Awards	Best Independent Album	Nominated	
2020	AIM Independent Music Awards	Best Creative Packaging	Nominated	
2020	Mercury Prize	Album of the Year	Nominated	

== Track listing ==
All tracks are written by Moses Boyd, except where noted.

Dark Matter track listing
No.	Title	Writer(s)	Length
1.	"Stranger Than Fiction"		4:55
2.	"Hard Food (Interlude)"		0:59
3.	"B.T.B"	M. Boyd; Nathaniel Cross	6:00
4.	"Y.O.Y.O."		5:30
5.	"Shades Of You" (with Poppy Ajudha)	Boyd; Poppy Ajudha	4:20
6.	"Dancing In The Dark" (with Obongjayar)	Boyd; Steven Umoh	4:47
7.	"Only You"		4:46
8.	"2 Far Gone" (with Joe Armon-Jones)	Boyd; Joe Armon-Jones	5:43
9.	"Nommos Descent" (with Nonku Phiri)	Boyd; Nonku Phiri	4:36
10.	"What Now?"		8:40

== Personnel ==
Credits adapted from Discogs and the album's liner notes:

=== Instrumentation and production ===
- Moses Boyd – producer (all tracks), drums (1, 3-10), drum programming (1, 2), songwriter (all tracks)
- Nathaniel Cross – arrangement (1, 3, 4, 10), trombone (1, 3, 4, 8, 10), songwriter (3)
- Joe Armon-Jones – keyboards (5, 8), synthesizer (1), rhodes (4), songwriter (8)
- Michael Underwood – tenor saxophone (1, 4, 10), flute (10)
- Ife Ogunjobe – trumpet (1, 3, 4, 8, 10)
- Theon Cross – tuba (1, 3, 4, 8)
- Artie Zaitz – guitar (1, 3–6, 10)
- Koyejo Oloko – executive producer (all tracks)
- Nubya Garcia – tenor saxophone (1, 9)
- Phillip Harper – percussion (3, 4)
- Binker Golding – tenor saxophone (3, 6)
- Poppy Ajudha – vocals, songwriter (5)
- Arnaud Gichaud – alto saxophone (3)
- Chelsea Carmichael – baritone saxophone (3)
- Steven Umoh – vocals, songwriter (6)
- Nonku Phiri – vocals, songwriter (9)
- Klein – vocals (7)
- Gary Crosby – vocals (2)

=== Technical and design ===
- Caspar Sutton-Jones – mastering engineer
- David Wehinm – mixing engineer, audio engineer
- Ahmad Dayes – recording engineer

* David Dargahi – recording engineer

- David Rodger – recording endineer
- Gilles Barrett – recording engineer
- Jay Thomas Heigl – recording engineer
- Mia Bradley – recording engineer
- Stella Murphy – designer
- Metropolis Studios – mastering location

== Charts ==
Chart performance for Dark Matter
Chart (2020)	Peak position
Scottish Albums (OCC)	52
UK Jazz & Blues Albums (OCC)	2
UK Independent Albums (OCC)	7
UK Independent Album Breakers (OCC)	1

== See also ==
- List of UK Independent Album Breakers Chart number ones of the 2020s
