= Lila Iké =

Jamaican reggae singer and songwriter

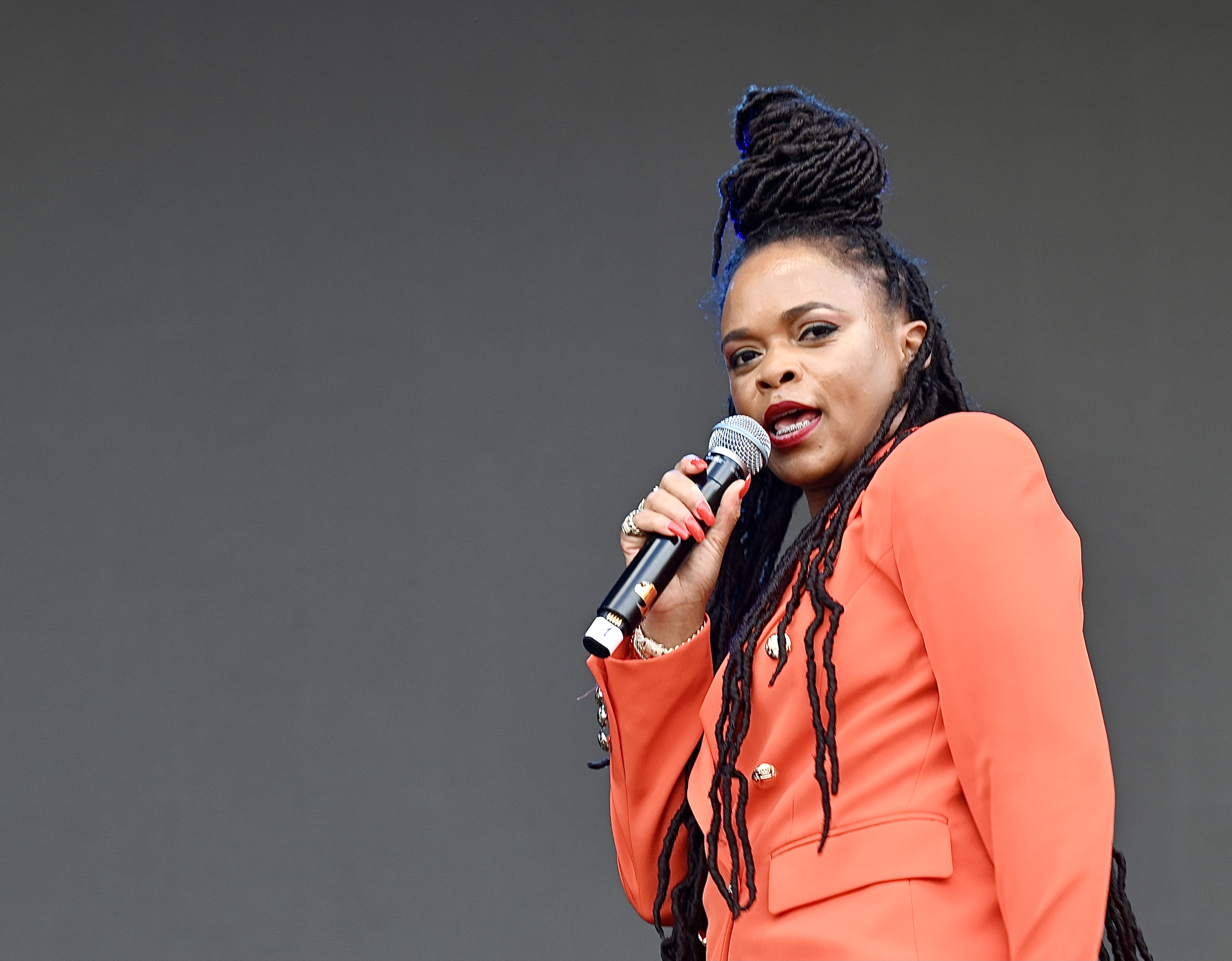
- Lila Iké performing at Reggae Geel 2022

Background information
- Born: Alecia Tameka Grey; 23 January 1994 (age 32); Christiana, Jamaica
- Origin: Manchester, Jamaica
- Occupations: Singer; songwriter
- Instrument: Vocals
- Years active: 2017–present
- Labels: In.Digg.Nation; RCA

Lila Iké (born Alecia Tameka Grey; January 23, 1994) is a Jamaican reggae singer and songwriter. After releasing multiple singles, Iké released her debut EP The ExPerience in May 2020. Her debut album Treasure Self Love, released in August 2025, was nominated for a Grammy in the Reggae category. She performed at the 2026 Grammy Awards.

== Career ==
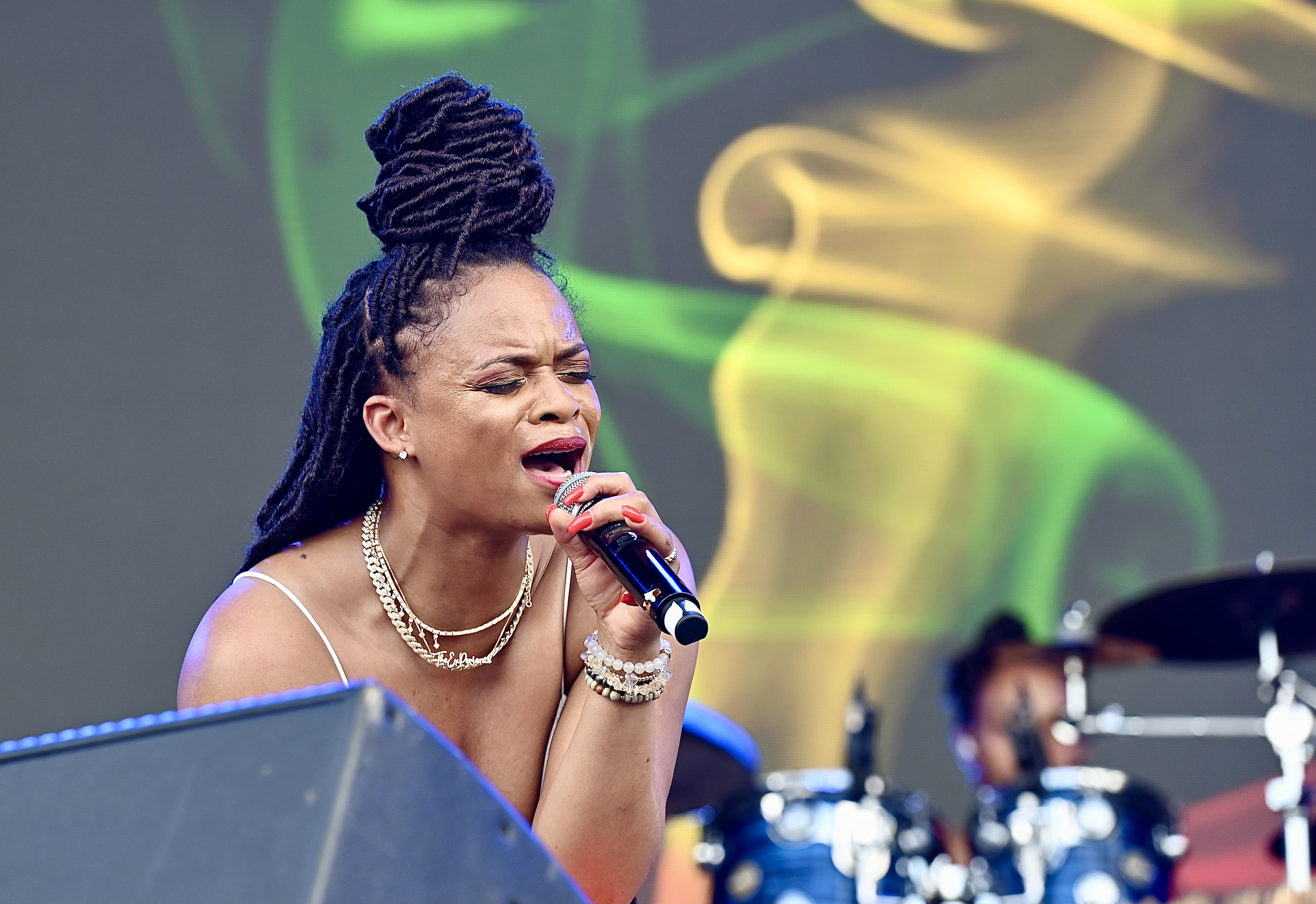
Lila Iké performing at Reggae Geel 2022

Grey was born in Christiana, Manchester, Jamaica where she attended Manchester High School and graduated in 2011. She enrolled at Northern Caribbean University in Mandeville until 2015. She attempted to return to school at The University of the West Indies, but stopped to pursue her musical career.

After moving to Kingston, she began singing under the moniker Lila Music which evolved to Lila Iké based on Nigerian name Ikéchukwu, which means "power of God". In 2017, she signed with Protoje's In.Digg.Nation label. In 2019, she toured Europe, including Rototom Sunsplash and Reggae Jam. She also opened for Protoje on his U.S. tour.

Her first EP, The ExPerience, was released in 2020. Some of her singles include "Biggest Fan" (2017), "Gotti Gotti" (2017), "Second Chance" (2018), "Where I'm Coming From" (2019), "Sweet Inspiration" (2019) and "I Spy" (2020). She appeared in the "Artist to Watch" list for BBC Radio 1Xtra's Hot for 2020. That same year, Vice call her one of "Jamaica's class of promising reggae artists, like Koffee and Chronixx".

In 2025, Iké announced her debut album Treasure Self Love, to be released in August 2025. It was subsequently nominated for the Grammy Award for Best Reggae Album.

== Discography ==
=== Charted singles ===
List of charted singles, showing year released, chart positions and album name
Title	Year	Peak chart position		Album
Title	Year	JAM Air.	EST Air.	Album
"He Loves Us Both" (featuring H.E.R.)	2024	7	—	Treasure Self Love
"Well Organised" (Ezra Collective featuring Lila Iké)	2026	—	84	Here Because of Hope
"—" denotes items which were not released in that country or failed to chart.
