= Blue Lab Beats =

British jazztronica music duo

Blue Lab Beats are a British music production duo from London, consisting of NK-OK (Namali Kwaten) and Mr DM (David Mrakpor). Their music blends jazz, hip hop, soul and electronic styles. They are winners of a Grammy Award for their production work on Angélique Kidjo's album Mother Nature, which won the Grammy Award for Best Global Music Album.

Blue Lab Beats were nominated for Best Jazz Act at the MOBO Awards 2021. They were nominated at the Jazz FM Awards in 2022 in three categories including Album of the Year and UK Jazz Act of the Year, and won the Jazz FM Innovation Award.

== Career ==
=== Formation and early releases ===
Blue Lab Beats are a London-based duo composed of producer and multi-instrumentalist David Mrakpor and producer NK-OK (Namali Kwaten). They emerged from the city's contemporary jazz scene in the mid-2010s.

Their early releases included the EP Blue Skies (2016), followed by Freedom (2017) and their debut studio album Xover (2018). Their second album Voyage was released in 2019.

The duo became associated with the resurgence of the UK jazz scene and have collaborated with artists including Kojey Radical, Sampa the Great, Nubya Garcia and Moses Boyd.

=== Blue Note Records and Motherland Journey ===
In 2022, Blue Lab Beats released their Blue Note album Motherland Journey. The album featured collaborations with artists from the UK and international jazz and soul scenes.

The duo gained wider recognition for their production work on Angélique Kidjo's album Mother Nature, which won the Grammy Award for Best Global Music Album. In the same year, they won the Jazz FM Innovation Award.

=== 2023–present: Blue Eclipse ===
In 2024, Blue Lab Beats released the album Blue Eclipse. The release marked a continued development of their sound and featured guest vocalists and instrumentalists from the contemporary UK music scene.

During this period, the duo expanded their live performances, appearing at festivals and headlining concerts in the UK and internationally.

== Members ==
- David Mrakpor – guitar, bass, keyboards
- Namali Kwaten – drum programming, percussion, production

== Discography ==
=== Studio albums ===
- Xover (2018)
- Voyage (2019)
- Motherland Journey (2022)
- Blue Eclipse (2024)
- The Blue Lab Beats Show (2026)

=== EPs ===
- Blue Skies (2016)
- Freedom (2017)
- Vibe Central (2019)
- We Will Rise (2021)

=== Selected singles ===
- "Keep Moving" (2017) (with Nubya Garcia)
- "Sam Cooke & Marvin Gaye" (2017) (with Tiana Major9 & Kojey Radical)
- "Pineapple" (2017) (with Moses Boyd & Nérija)
- "Next (Wake Up)" (2019) (with Sampa the Great)
- "Dat It" (2021) (with Kiefer)
- "Gotta Go Fast" (2022)
