= Voice notes =

Voice notes may refer to:

- Voice notes, a feature on BlackBerry phones
- Voicenotes, a 2018 album by Charlie Puth
- Voice Notes (album), a 2023 album by Yazmin Lacey
