= Source (album) =

2020 album by Nubya Garcia

Studio album by Nubya Garcia
- Released: 21 August 2020
- Recorded: 2019
- Genre: Jazz
- Length: 1:00:49
- Label: Concord Jazz
- Producer: Nubya Garcia; Kwes

Nubya Garcia chronology
Source (2020)	Odyssey (2024)

Singles from Source
- 1. "Source" Released: 21 August 2020

Source is the debut studio album by British jazz tenor saxophonist Nubya Garcia. It was released on 21 August 2020, by Concord Jazz. Described by Garcia as "a definite ode to musical history", the record expands on her jazz roots while incorporating dubstep, reggae, Colombian cumbia, calypso, hip-hop, soul, and African-diasporic sounds.

== Background and release ==
Source follows Nubya Garcia's debut album Nubya’s 5ive, issued on Jazz re:freshed in 2017 and the self-released EP When We Are (2018). Garcia and Kwes produced all tracks on the album. The album features her touring band members: pianist Joe Armon-Jones, double bassist Daniel Casimir and drummer Sam Jones. KOKOROKO members Cassie Kinoshi, Richie Seivwright and Sheila Maurice-Grey perform vocals on two tracks, with the latter also contributing trumpet and flugelhorn on two other tracks. The closing track, "Boundless Beings" features vocals from pianist Akenya. According to Garcia, Source is about personal power, collective power, and collectivism. She told The New York Times: "It's about my heritage, my ancestry, exploring those places and those stories from my parents and my grandparents." Recorded in 2019 in two studio sessions in her hometown of London and in Bogota, Colombia, the album serves a reflection of her hometown, paying homage to the rich cultural community of London.

The record was announced in July 2020, alongside the cover-art and tracklist. The title track was served as the lead single from the album, and features guest appearances from saxophonist Cassie Kinoshi, trombonist Richie Seivwright, and Colombian band La Perla. Source was released on 21 August 2020 by Concord Jazz.

== Critical reception ==
Professional ratings
Aggregate scores
Source	Rating
AnyDecentMusic?	7.6/10
Metacritic	81/100
Review scores
Source	Rating
AllMusic	5/5 stars
Clash	8/10'
Gigwise	8/10 stars
The Line of Best Fit	8/10
NME	8/10
The Observer	3/5 stars
Pitchfork	8.3/10
Uncut	4/5 stars

At Metacritic, which assigns a weighted average rating out of 100 to reviews from mainstream publications, this release received an average score of 81, based on nine reviews, indicating "universal acclaim". At AnyDecentMusic?, which collates album reviews from websites, magazines and newspapers, they gave the release a 7.6 out of 10, based on a critical consensus of 10 reviews.

In The New York Times, Marcus J. Moore described the album as a "grand achievement" in London's buzzing jazz scene. Pitchfork's Andy Beta believed that the album established Garcia as a foundational voice in the buzzing London jazz scene. He considered the record as a "stunning introduction" in which Garcia "meditates on her humble family heritage, the continuum of jazz history, and the power of collective action in our present moment." Similarly, Conrad Duncan of Clash praised Garcia's "exceptional" quality of playing on the album, while also demonstrating her artistry as a composer. Thom Jurek of AllMusic lauded the album for its "adventurous, kinetic, and sophisticated approach in wedding modern composition, improvisation, and production to rhythmic and harmonic traditions" and listed it amongst the best jazz records of London. Gigwise writer Emily Fortune praised the album as a bold attempt that explores her artistry and leans into the unknowns.

In The Line of Best Fit, Stephen Loftin wrote that "Source is akin to an old friend you may not see for a while, but whenever you do, the world feels that little bit brighter and it’s as if no time has passed at all." Writing for NME, Dhruva Balram felt that the record nods "to jazz greats of the past." In The Observer, Kitty Empire classified the album as a multi-mood record that celebrates "the power of the collective and the heritage of the African diaspora." Louis Pattinson from Uncut described the record as "deeply melodic, brilliantly played, and blessed with a spirit that feels generous and boundless."

== Track listing ==
All tracks have been written by Garcia and produced by Kwes. Akenya has writing credits on track 9.

Source track listing
No.	Title	Length
1.	"Pace"	7:53
2.	"The Message Continues"	6:45
3.	"Source" (ft. Ms MAURICE, Cassie Kinoshi and Richie Seivwright)	12:08
4.	"Together Is a Beautiful Place to Be"	7:36
5.	"Stand with Each Other" (ft. Ms MAURICE, Cassie Kinoshi and Richie Seivwright)	3:39
6.	"Inner Game"	7:45
7.	"La cumbia me está llamando" (ft. La Perla)	4:15
8.	"Before Us: In Demerara & Caura" (ft. Ms MAURICE)	8:01
9.	"Boundless Beings" (ft. Akenya)	2:47
Total length:		1:00:49

== Personnel ==
Credits adapted from Tidal.

- Nubya Garcia – producer, writer, tenor saxophone (all tracks)
- Kwes – producer (all tracks)
- Daniel Casimir – double bass (all tracks)
- Joe Armon-Jones – keyboards, piano (all tracks)
- Sam Jones – drums (all tracks)
- Giles Barrett – recording (all tracks)
- Cassie Kinoshi – tenor saxophone (track 3), featured vocals (track 5)
- Ritchie Seivwright – featured vocals (tracks 3, 5)
- Sheila Maurice Grey – featured vocals (tracks 3, 5), trumpet (track 4)
- La perla – featured performer (track 7)
- Diana Sammiguel – vocals, maracas (track 7)
- Giovanna Mogollon – vocals (track 7)
- Karen Forero – vocals (track 7)
- Akenya – featured vocals, writer (track 9)
