= Dance, No One's Watching =

Studio album by Ezra Collective
- Released: 27 September 2024
- Length: 57:44
- Label: Partisan
- Producer: Ezra Collective

Ezra Collective chronology
Where I'm Meant to Be (2022)	Dance, No One's Watching (2024)	Here Because of Hope (2026)

Singles from Dance, No One's Watching
- 1. "Ajala" Released: 24 April 2024; 2. "God Gave Me Feet for Dancing" Released: 18 June 2024

Dance, No One's Watching is the third studio album by London jazz quintet Ezra Collective, released on 27 September 2024 by Partisan Records. It was preceded by two singles.

== Background and release ==
Dance, No One's Watching is the band's follow-up to their Mercury Prize-winning 2022 album Where I'm Meant to Be.

The album's first single, "Ajala", was released on 24 April 2024. The song was recorded in Lagos in October 2023. It was named after Nigerian writer Olabisi Ajala, as well as being a reference to a Nigerian slang term for someone who can't sit still.

The album was announced on 18 June for a release date of 27 September by Partisan Records. With the announcement came the second single, "God Gave Me Feet for Dancing", featuring vocals from Yazmin Lacey and coming with a music video directed by Tajana Tokyo. Drummer Femi Koleoso talked about the importance of dance in his and his bandmates' lives, and said the song is "meant to look at dancing in a more spiritual capacity, like it's our God-given ability to shake away the badness of life and dance instead."

== Live ==
Along with the album, the band announced a tour of Europe from July through November. The tour culminated with a headlining concert at Wembley Arena on November 15, the first time a British jazz act headlined at the venue.

== Reception ==
Dance, No One's Watching ratings
Aggregate scores
Source	Rating
AnyDecentMusic?	8.2/10
Metacritic	85/100
Review scores
Source	Rating
AllMusic	4/5 stars
Clash	8/10
The Independent	4/5 stars
The Line of Best Fit	8/10
Mojo	4/5 stars
MusicOMH	4.5/5 stars
NME	4/5 stars
The Observer	4/5 stars

"Ajala" was nominated for Best Independent Track at the 2024 AIM Independent Music Awards, but lost to Sampha's "Spirit 2.0". Dance, No One's Watching was ranked 33rd on Mojo's Best Albums of 2024 list.

== Track listing ==
All music is composed by Femi Koleoso, Ife Ogunjobi, James Mollison, Joe Armon-Jones, and TJ Koleoso (Ezra Collective), except where noted.

Dance, No One's Watching track listing
No.	Title	Lyrics	Music	Length
1.	"Intro"			1:22
2.	"The Herald"			3:45
3.	"Palm Wine"			5:13
4.	"Cloakroom Link Up (Act 1)"		Ezra Collective; Matt Roberts	0:24
5.	"God Gave Me Feet for Dancing" (featuring Yazmin Lacey)	Lacey; Craigie Dodds		3:59
6.	"Ajala"			4:22
7.	"The Traveller"		Ezra Collective; Larry Heard	1:13
8.	"In the Dance (Act 2)"		Ezra Collective; Roberts	0:42
9.	"N29"			3:22
10.	"No One's Watching Me" (featuring Olivia Dean)	Dean	Ezra Collective; Dean	4:22
11.	"Our Element (Act 3)"		Ezra Collective; Roberts	0:38
12.	"Hear My Cry"		Ezra Collective; Gerald Peters; Marvia Providence	3:31
13.	"Shaking Body"			3:12
14.	"Expensive"		Fela Kuti	6:11
15.	"Streets Is Calling" (featuring M.anifest and Moonchild Sanelly)	M.anifest; Moonchild Sanelly	Ezra Collective; M.anifest; Moonchild Sanelly	2:33
16.	"Lights On (Act 4)"		Ezra Collective; Roberts	0:39
17.	"Why I Smile"			5:10
18.	"Have Patience"			2:00
19.	"Everybody"			5:14
Total length:				57:44

== Personnel ==
=== Ezra Collective ===
- Femi Koleoso – drums
- TJ Koleoso – bass
- Ife Ogunjobi – trumpet
- James Mollison – tenor saxophone
- Joe Armon-Jones – synthesiser

=== Additional musicians ===
- Yazmin Lacey – vocals (5)
- Olivia Dean – vocals (10)
- M.anifest – vocals (15)
- Moonchild Sanelly – vocals (15)

=== Technical ===
- Ezra Collective – producers
- David Wrench – mixing engineer

== Charts ==
Chart performance for Dance, No One's Watching
Chart (2024–2026)	Peak position
Belgian Albums (Ultratop Flanders)	76
French Jazz Albums (SNEP)	14
Scottish Albums (Official Charts)	6
UK Albums (Official Charts)	7
UK Independent Albums (Official Charts)	2
US Top Contemporary Jazz Albums (Billboard)	7
