= Here Because of Hope =

Studio album by Ezra Collective
- Released: 11 September 2026
- Studios: Miraval (Correns); Abbey Road (London); Livingston (London); The Church (London); Studio 13 (London); Secret Agents (London); Aquarli (London)
- Length: 63:20
- Label: Partisan
- Producer: Ezra Collective

Ezra Collective chronology
Dance, No One's Watching (2024)	Here Because of Hope (2026)

Singles from Here Because of Hope
- 1. "Only Love" Released: 28 May 2026; 2. "Well Organised" Released: 7 July 2026; 3. "Jubilee Feeling" Released: 25 August 2026

Here Because of Hope is the fourth studio album by the London jazz quintet Ezra Collective, released on 11 September 2026 by Partisan Records.

== Background and release ==
Here Because of Hope is the band's follow-up to their 2024 album Dance, No One's Watching. It was announced on 28 May for an initial release date of 18 September, with the album's first single, "Only Love", released on the same day and featured British-Gambian rapper Pa Salieu. Two further singles followed: the Caribbean-inspired "Well Organised", which featured Jamaican singer Lila Iké and released on 7 July, and "Jubilee Feeling", which released on 25 August and was influenced by contemporary British music. Alongside Salieu and Iké, the album features guest vocals by Leona Lewis and Libianca, as well as spoken word by actor Letitia Wright.

The band described the album as more mature and adult than their previous work, built around the progression from pain and despair to joy. Drummer and band leader Femi Koleoso stated:

"...hope also captures the belief that on the other side of pain there can be renewal. There's joy after mourning. Beauty from the ashes. Even when you don't know how or when things will change, there can still be something inside you that believes your feet will eventually land on solid ground. So on one side, you have pain; on the other, there will be joy. And hope is a marker on that spectrum that brings you from one end to the other; it makes you feel like getting to joy might be possible."

The album's journey from despair to joy is reflected in its three-act structure and its geographical selection of genre influences, born from the band's observation that much of Black music was very upbeat, despite its frequently tragic origins. As such, the album moves from Africa, to the Caribbean, culminating in the UK and their home city of London, incorporating elements of each location's genres, including afrobeat, calypso, grime, latin jazz, and reggae.

The album released on 11 September and debuted at number 1 on the UK Albums Chart, surpassing Dance, No One's Watching's record of 7th; the band are the first UK jazz group to achieve this.

== Reception ==
Here Because of Hope ratings
Aggregate scores
Source	Rating
AnyDecentMusic?	8.1/10
Metacritic	86/100
Review scores
Source	Rating
AllMusic	4.5/5 stars
Clash	9/10
DIY	4.5/5 stars
Financial Times	4/5 stars
MusicOMH	4/5 stars
Spectrum Culture	84/100

Any Decent Music gave the album a weighted average score of 8.1 out of 10 from twelve critic scores. According to Metacritic, it received "universal acclaim" based on a weighted average score of 86 out of 100 from ten critic scores.

For Flood Magazine, Tom Morgan described the album as "extremely easy-to-love" and "a heartfelt marvel", especially praising the guest vocals of Libianca and Leona Lewis. Ben Broyd of Clash rated the album 9/10, writing that the album was the band's "most ambitious and emotionally expansive project to date", and that it "offers feelings of calm, clarity and purpose, while further cementing Ezra Collective as one of the music scene’s most innovative and creative forces".

Writing in the Financial Times, Ludovic Hunter-Tilney stated that the "music throughout is cogently presented and bursting with life, at once methodical and uplifting," and gave the album a 4/5. Also awarding a 4/5, John Murphy in MusicOMH wrote that the album "shows off Ezra Collective’s exuberant and more reflective sides, providing not only a proud history of Black music but also a demonstration that, in these hands, it’s still very much in the rudest of health."

== Track listing ==
All music is composed by Femi Koleoso, Ife Ogunjobi, James Mollison, Joe Armon-Jones, and TJ Koleoso (Ezra Collective).

Here Because of Hope track listing
No.	Title	Lyrics	Length
1.	"Part 1" (read by Letitia Wright)	Femi Koleoso; Letitia Wright	0:45
2.	"Blow Your Trumpet"		4:20
3.	"Sweet Echo"		5:16
4.	"Don't Worry"		3:45
5.	"Only Love" (featuring Pa Salieu)	Pa Salieu	3:22
6.	"Someday"		5:47
7.	"Part 2" (read by Letitia Wright)	F. Koleoso; TJ Koleoso	0:35
8.	"Birdie Sings"		4:13
9.	"The Last Stand"		3:51
10.	"Well Organised" (featuring Lila Iké)	Lila Iké; Lee Perry; Maxie Smith	3:32
11.	"El Corazón"		4:06
12.	"Bunny on the Rise"		4:22
13.	"Part 3" (read by Letitia Wright)	F. Koleoso; Wright	0:47
14.	"All I Need" (featuring Leona Lewis)	Leona Lewis	4:31
15.	"Jubilee Feeling"		4:15
16.	"Black Flag"		4:22
17.	"Most High" (featuring Libianca)	Libianca	5:21
Total length:			1:03:20

== Personnel ==
Credits are adapted from the album's liner notes.

=== Ezra Collective ===
- Femi Koleoso – drums, production
- TJ Koleoso – bass, production, photography
- Joe Armon-Jones – keyboards, production
- James Mollison – saxophone, production
- Ife Ogunjobi – trumpet, production; programming (tracks 5, 10)

=== Additional contributors ===
- Riley MacIntyre – engineering (all tracks), programming (2)
- Freddie Light – additional engineering
- Riley Spencer – studio assistance
- Niamh O'Sullivan – studio assistance
- Kevin O'Reilly – studio assistance
- Daniela Sicillia – studio assistance
- Annie Gasiorowski – studio assistance
- Nia Clarke – studio assistance
- Jules Bonnet – studio assistance
- Paul Guiramion – studio assistance
- Giacomo Vianello – studio assistance
- David Wrench – mixing
- Stuart Hawkes – mastering
- Letitia Wright – reading (1, 7, 13)
- Lotus Warmington-Armon-Jones – heartbeat (2)
- Tobi Adenaike – guitar (3–6, 8, 9, 12, 15, 17)
- Matt Roberts – trumpet (3, 4, 6, 8, 9, 11, 14, 15)
- Kaidi Akinnibi – alto saxophone (3, 4, 6, 8, 9, 11, 14, 15)
- Jermaine Amissah – baritone saxophone (3, 4, 6, 8, 9, 11, 14, 15)
- Harry Brown – trombone (3, 4, 6, 8, 9, 11, 14, 15)
- Oli Savill – percussion (3, 4, 8, 9, 11, 14, 15, 17), congas (10)
- Karl Vanden Bossche – percussion (3, 8, 9, 15, 17)
- Joyful Koleoso – percussion (4)
- Shiloh Koleoso – percussion (4)
- Pa Salieu – vocals (5)
- Luke Farnell – engineering (5)
- Lila Iké – vocals (10)
- Kinetika Bloco – steelpans (10)
- Leona Lewis – vocals (14)
- TJ Carter – drum programming (15)
- Sunshine Koleoso – heartbeat (15)
- Libianca – vocals (17)
- Ebeneza Blanche – photography

== Charts ==
=== Weekly charts ===
Weekly chart performance for Here Because of Hope
Chart (2026)	Peak position
Australian Jazz & Blues Albums (ARIA)	2
Belgian Albums (Ultratop Flanders)	47
French Albums (SNEP)	176
French Jazz Albums (SNEP)	2
Dutch Albums (Album Top 100)	78
Irish Independent Albums (IRMA)	19
Scottish Albums (Official Charts)	1
Swiss Albums (Schweizer Hitparade)	61
UK Albums (Official Charts)	1
UK Independent Albums (Official Charts)	1
UK Jazz & Blues Albums (Official Charts)	1
US Top Contemporary Jazz Albums (Billboard)	6

=== Monthly charts ===
Monthly chart performance for Here Because of Hope
Chart (2026)	Peak position
German Jazz Albums (Offizielle Top 100)	1
