= Joe Armon-Jones =

English jazz keyboardist (born 1993)

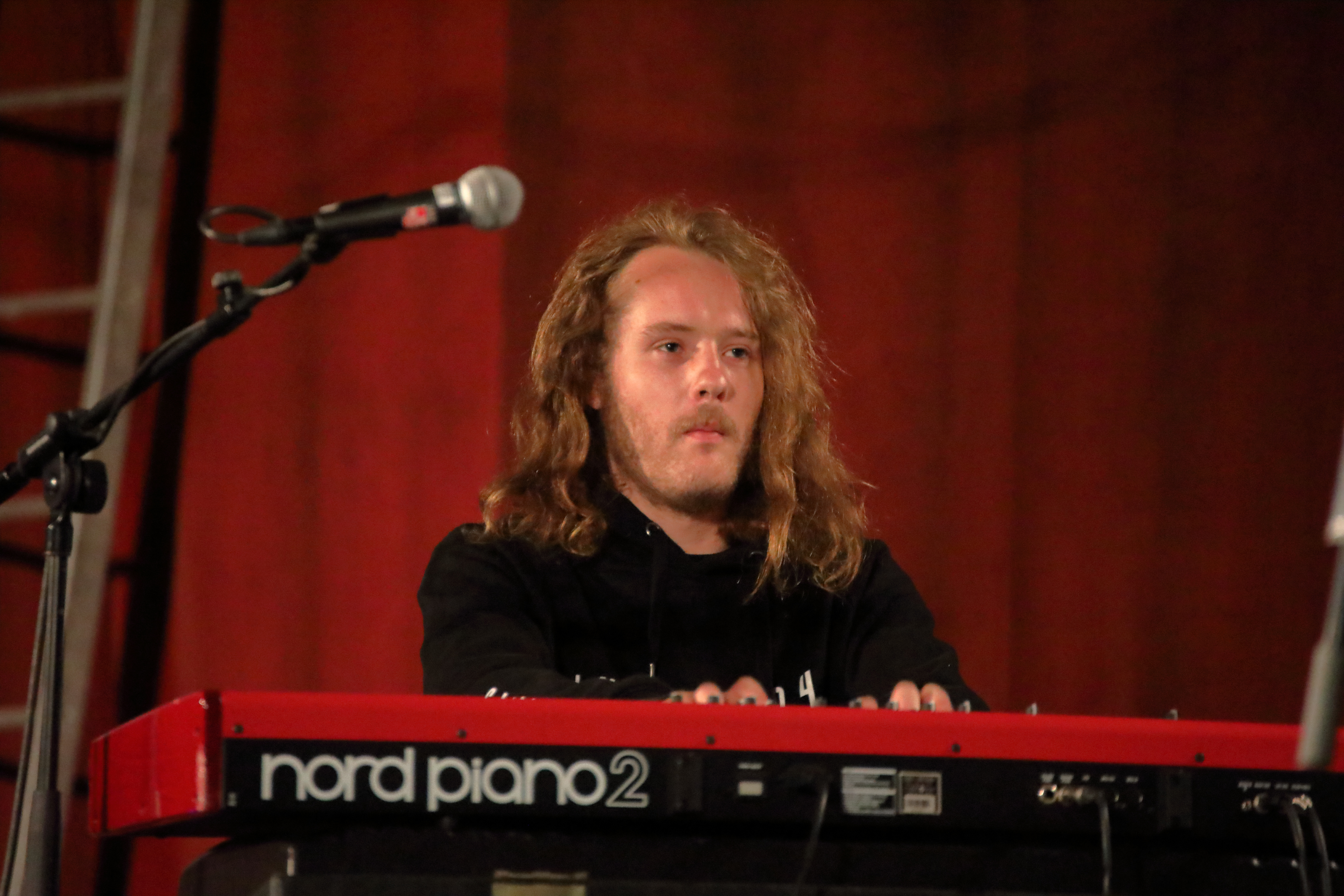
- Performing in 2019

Background information
- Born: Joe Armon-Jones; 1993 (age 32–33); Oxfordshire, England
- Occupations: Composer, producer
- Instruments: Keyboards
- Years active: 2016—present
- Labels: Brownswood, YAM, Aquarii
- Member of: Ezra Collective

Joseph Armon-Jones (born February 1993) is a British musician, keyboardist, composer, producer and bandleader.

His debut album, Starting Today, was released in May 2018 and his second album, Turn To Clear View, was released in September 2019. Time magazine listed the 2019 release as one of the top 10 albums of the year. Aside from his solo work, he is a member of Ezra Collective and Nubya Garcia's band.

== Background ==
Joe Armon-Jones was born in Oxfordshire to musician parents, his mother being a singer and his father a jazz pianist. He was educated at Eton College.

He attended the workshops of Tomorrow's Warriors under the direction of bass player Gary Crosby, where he met and became a founding member of the group Ezra Collective. Armon-Jones graduated from Trinity Laban with a Bachelor of Music degree in 2016. Among his graduating class were Nubya Garcia and Moses Boyd.

== Discography ==
=== As leader ===
- Idiom (Joe Armon-Jones & Maxwell Owin, YAM Records, 2017)
- Starting Today (Brownswood, 2018)
- Turn to Clear View (Brownswood, 2019)
- A Way Back (Joe Armon-Jones & Mala, Aquarii Records, 2022)
- Archetype (Aquarii Records, 2023)
- All the Quiet (Part I) (Aquarii Records, 2025)

=== With Ezra Collective ===
- Chapter 7 (2016)
- Juan Pablo: The Philosopher (Enter the Jungle, 2017)
- You Can't Steal My Joy, (Enter the Jungle, 2019)
- Where I'm Meant to Be (Partisan, 2022)
- Dance, No One's Watching (Partisan, 2024)
- Here Because of Hope (Partisan, 2026)

=== As sideman ===
- Nubya Garcia, Nubya's 5ive (Jazz Refreshed, 2017)
- Moses Boyd, Displaced Diaspora (Exodus, 2018)
- Various artists, We Out Here (Brownswood, 2018)
- SEED Ensemble, Driftglass (Jazz Refreshed, 2019)
- Binker Golding, Abstractions of Reality (2019)
- Tony Allen & Hugh Masekela, Rejoice (World Circuit/BMG, 2020)
- Moses Boyd, Dark Matter (Exodus, 2020)
- Nubya Garcia, Source (Concord Jazz, 2020)
- Keleketla!, Keleketla! (Ahead of Our Time, 2020)
- Gilles Peterson, MV4 (Brownswood, 2020)
- Nubya Garcia, Odyssey (Concord Jazz, 2024)

== Awards ==
- 2019 Jazz FM Awards – UK Jazz Act of the Year – Nominee
- 2019 Worldwide Awards – Best Album – Nominee
- 2019 Worldwide Awards – Session of the Year – Winner
- 2020 Urban Music Awards – Best Jazz Act – Nominee
- 2020 Jazz FM Awards – UK Jazz Act of the Year – Nominee
- 2020 MOBO Awards – Best Jazz Act – Nominee
