= Odyssey (Nubya Garcia album) =

Studio album by Nubya Garcia
- Released: September 20, 2024
- Recorded: 2024
- Genre: Jazz
- Length: 60:49
- Label: Concord Jazz
- Producer: Nubya Garcia; Kwes

Nubya Garcia chronology
Source (2020)	Odyssey (2024)

Odyssey is the second studio album by British jazz saxophonist Nubya Garcia, released on 20 September 2024 by Concord Jazz. The album blends orchestral arrangements with R&B, jazz, and dub influences.

== Background and recording ==
Garcia collaborated with producer Kwes on Odyssey. The album features her touring band members: Joe Armon-Jones (keys), Daniel Casimir (bass), and Sam Jones (drums). Notable guest artists include Esperanza Spalding and Georgia Anne Muldrow with strings from Chineke! Orchestra.

== Release ==
Odyssey was announced in mid-2024 and released on 20 September 2024 by Concord Jazz. The album was released as a 2LP, CD and digital formats.

== Track listing ==
Odyssey track listing
No.	Title	Length
1.	"Dawn" (featuring Esperanza Spalding)	4:52
2.	"Odyssey"	7:23
3.	"Solstice"	4:49
4.	"Set It Free" (featuring Richie)	4:06
5.	"The Seer"	5:02
6.	"Odyssey - Outerlude"	0:47
7.	"We Walk In Gold" (featuring Georgia Anne Muldrow)	3:54
8.	"Water's Path"	4:01
9.	"Clarity"	6:15
10.	"In Other Words, Living"	4:07
11.	"Clarity - Outerlude"	1:37
12.	"Triumphance"	5:54
Total length:		52:47

Japanese edition bonus track
No.	Title	Length
11.	"Clarity - Alternative Version"	4:41
Total length:		57:36

== Personnel ==
- Nubya Garcia – tenor saxophone, producer
- Joe Armon-Jones – keyboards
- Daniel Casimir – double bass
- Sam Jones – drums
- Jansen Santana - percussion
- Strings - Chineke! Orchestra
- Esperanza Spalding – vocals (track 1)
- Richie – vocals (track 4)
- Georgia Anne Muldrow – vocals (track 7)
- Kwes – producer
