= Poppy Ajudha =

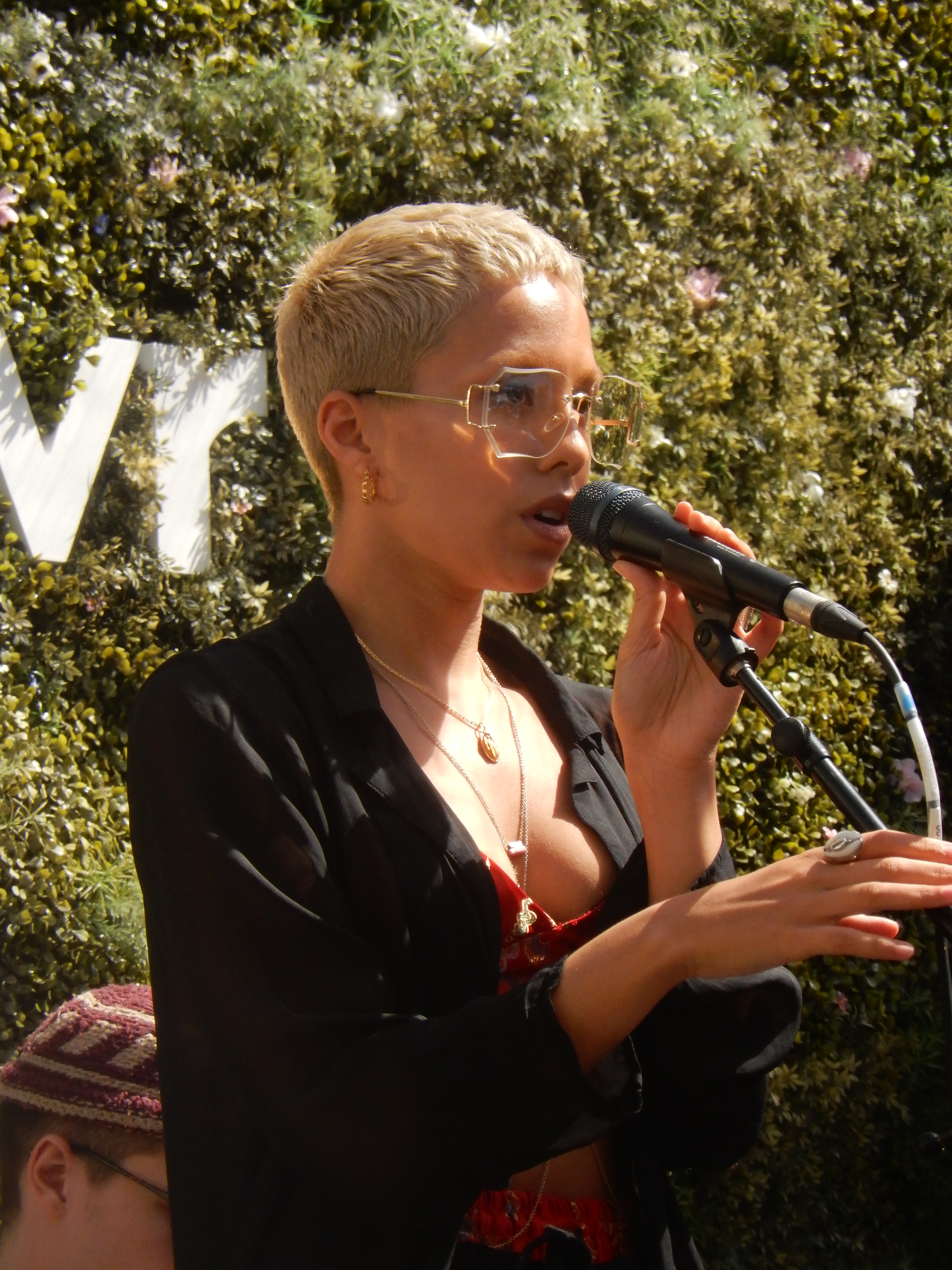
- Ajudha in 2017

Background information
- Born: 22 April 1995 (age 31)
- Genres: Soul; jazz; pop; alternative R&B
- Instruments: Vocals; guitar
- Years active: 2015–present
- Label: Indigo Soul
- Website: www.poppyajudha.co.uk

Poppy Ajudha (born 22 April 1995) is an English singer-songwriter and producer. She released her debut and second EPs Femme and Patience (both 2018) and collaborated with the likes of Kojey Radical and Tom Misch. She won Soul Act of the Year at the 2019 Jazz FM Awards. She has since released the albums The Power in Us (2022) and Poppy (2024).

== Early life ==
Ajudha was born to a white English mother and a father of black and Indo-Saint Lucian descent and grew up in Deptford, South London, where her father ran Paradise Bar. Her parents separated when she was young.

Ajudha applied but did not go to the BRIT School. She graduated with a Bachelor of Arts (BA) in Anthropology and Music from SOAS University of London.

== Career ==
=== 2015–2017: Beginnings ===
At age 20 in 2015, Ajudha released the single "David's Song" via Indigo Soul, which she wrote for her friend the saxophonist David Turay, who had passed away the year prior. She released her second single "Peace of Mind" in 2016 and then her third "Love Falls Down" in April 2017. She performed at the 2017 Love Supreme Jazz Festival.

=== 2017–2019: Femme and Patience ===
That autumn in 2017, Ajudha released the singles "Spilling Into You" featuring Kojey Radical and "Tepid Soul". The music video for the former was nominated for Best Pop Video – Newcomer at the 2017 UK Music Video Awards. Both songs would appear on Ajudha's early 2018 debut EP Femme. The music video for "She is the Sum" from Femme was nominated for Best Pop Video – Newcomer at the 2018 UK Music Video Awards. In addition, Ajudha featured on the Tom Misch track "Disco Yes". She supported Misch and Jamila Woods on tour and performed at The Great Escape Festival.

Ajudha's second EP Patience followed in late 2018 as well as the single "White Water". Ajudha appeared on a Clash list of "women pushing UK jazz forward" and starred in a Napapijri Icons campaign. This was followed by the single "Devil's Juice" in 2019. Ajudha won Soul Act of the Year at the 2019 Jazz FM Awards. She performed on the Silver Hayes stage at the 2019 Glastonbury Festival among other festivals.

=== 2020–2021: Further singles and collaborations ===
In early 2020, Ajudha collaborated with Moses Boyd on the track "Shades of You" and Mahalia on "Low Ride" and released the single "Strong Womxn". Ajudha then contributed a "Watermelon Man" cover to the jazz compilation album Blue Note Re:imagined and released the single "Black Joy. Black Peace. Black Justice".

Ajudha released the singles "Weakness" and "Change Your Mind" in 2021. Ajudha was a BBC Music Introducing Featured Artist and performed at Standon Calling. She also had features on the tracks "Darkest Hour" by Swindle with Daley and "Love You" by Tom Ford.

=== 2021–present: The Power in Us and Poppy ===
In November 2021 with the single "London's Burning", Ajudha announced her forthcoming debut album The Power in Us would be released in spring 2022. "Playgod" and "NO!" were other singles from the album.

Ajudha returned in 2024 with the singles "My Future", "Ready" and "Girl Next Door" and her self-titled second album Poppy was released in late 2024. She performed at 2024 London Pride. Her original song "I Feel Free" featured on the soundtrack of the Amazon Prime series My Lady Jane. Ajudha embarked on a March 2025 headline tour.

== Artistry ==
Ajudha's sound blends soul, jazz, pop and R&B. Ajudha's formative influences included Amy Winehouse, Adele, Lianne La Havas, Lily Allen and The Pussycat Dolls. Amid her degree, Ajudha began incorporating political themes into her lyrics.

== Personal life ==
Ajudha is queer.

== Discography ==
=== Albums ===
- The Power in Us (2022)
- Poppy (2024)

=== EPs ===
- FEMME (2018)
- Patience (2018)

=== Singles ===
- "David's Song" (2015)
- "Peace of Mind" (2016)
- "Love Falls Down" (2017)
- "Spilling Into You" (2017) featuring Kojey Radical
- "Tepid Soul" (2017)
- "White Water" (2018)
- "Devil's Juice" (2019)
- "Low Ride" (2020) featuring Mahalia
- "Strong Womxn" (2020)
- "Black Joy. Black Peace. Black Justice" (2020)
- "Weakness" (2021)
- "Change Your Mind" (2021)
- "London's Burning" (2021)
- "PLAYGOD" (2022)
- "NO!" (2022)
- "My Future" (2024)
- "Ready" (2024)
- "Girl Next Door" (2024)

=== As featured artist ===
- "Disco Yes" (2018) by Tom Misch
- "Shades of You" (2020) by Moses Boyd
- "Darkest Hour" (2021) by Swindle with Daley
- "Love You" (2021) by Tom Ford

== Awards and nominations ==
Year	Award	Category	Work	Result	Ref.
2017	UK Music Video Awards	Best Pop Video – Newcomer	"Spilling Into You"	Nominated	
2018	UK Music Video Awards	Best Pop Video – Newcomer	"She is the Sum"	Nominated	
2019	Jazz FM Awards	Soul Act of the Year		Won	
