= Ezra Collective =

British jazz quintet

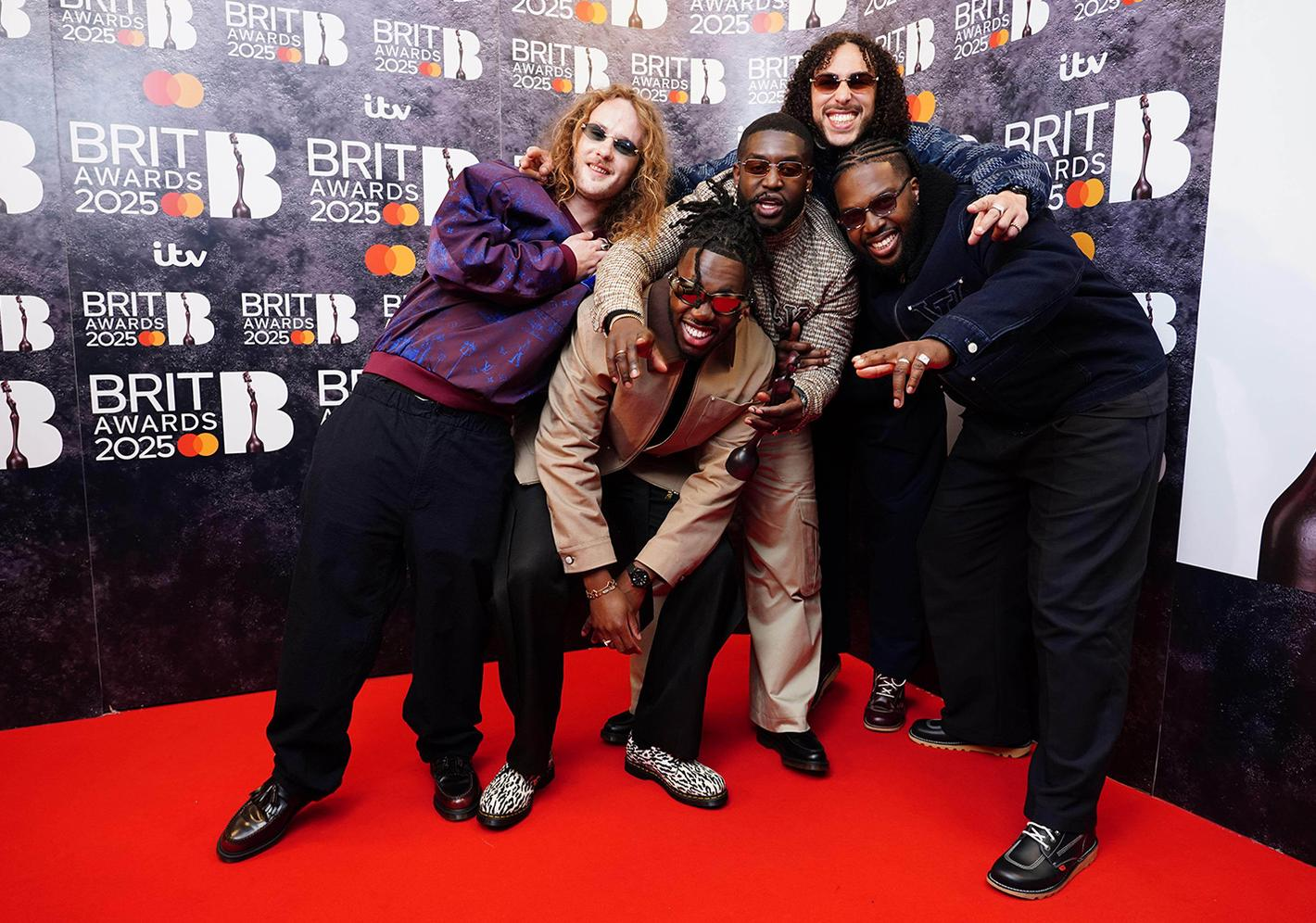
- Ezra Collective win Group of the Year at the Brit Awards 2025

Background information
- Origin: London, England
- Genres: Jazz; hip-hop; Afrobeat
- Instruments: Drums; keyboards; bass guitar; tenor saxophone; trumpet
- Years active: 2016–present
- Labels: Enter the Jungle; Partisan
- Members: Femi Koleoso; TJ Koleoso; Ife Ogunjobi; James Mollison; Joe Armon-Jones
- Past members: Dylan Jones
- Website: ezracollective.com

Ezra Collective are a British jazz quintet composed of drummer and bandleader Femi Koleoso, bassist TJ Koleoso, keyboardist Joe Armon-Jones, trumpeter Ife Ogunjobi, and tenor saxophonist James Mollison, who met at the jazz youth programme Tomorrow's Warriors and formed their group soon afterwards. The group fuses elements of Afrobeat, calypso, reggae, hip-hop, soul and jazz, and frequently collaborates with fellow London-based jazz musicians such as Nubya Garcia and Moses Boyd. They were the recipients of the 2023 Mercury Music Prize. Their 2024 single "God Gave Me Feet for Dancing" was chosen by Barack Obama for his list of 25 favourite songs of the year. At the Brit Awards 2025, the Ezra Collective became the first jazz band to win the "Group of the Year" accolade.

== Background ==
The London-based quintet formed in 2012 by brothers Femi Koleoso (drums) and TJ Koleoso (electric bass), together with James Mollison (sax), Joe Armon-Jones (keyboards) and Dylan Jones (trumpet). Jones has since been replaced by Ife Ogunjobi. The members of Ezra Collective met at the jazz programme Tomorrow's Warriors, run by Gary Crosby and Janine Irons. Their name is a reference to the Biblical prophet Ezra and his practice of studying the works of the greats who came before him - something the band wished to emulate within jazz. The jazz group has claimed that they faced challenges in succeeding as young jazz musicians in London, with Femi Koleoso saying: "I saw jazz music as an elite art form that I didn't have access to." He puts down the group's success as being able to freely express their musical influences from their youth. The band has said that Robert Glasper, and Kendrick Lamar's To Pimp a Butterfly provided early inspiration for their "template" as a jazz band.

== Career ==
The band's 2019 instrumental single "Quest for Coin" was premiered as the "Hottest Record in The World" on Annie Mac on BBC Radio 1. In 2019, Ezra Collective released their debut LP You Can't Steal My Joy, which featured British musicians Jorja Smith and Loyle Carner. In 2022, the band released its second LP, Where I'm Meant to Be, involving a mix of both instrumental tracks and lyrical collaborations. Critical reception was widely positive, with Kate Hutchinson from The Guardian writing that the "exceptional album could be the one to cross over to the big league".

On 3 March 2023, it was announced that Ezra Collective would be performing at the 2023 Glastonbury Festival.

On 7 September 2023, the band won the 2023 Mercury Prize for their album Where I'm Meant To Be, making them the first jazz act to win the award in its 31-year history. Following the announcement, Femi Koleoso highlighted the band's youthful origins, saying: "This moment we're celebrating right here is testimony to good, special people putting time and effort into [helping] young people to play music... let's continue to support that."

Alexis Petridis lauded the winning album by saying that Where I'm Meant To Be "stirs together Afro-Cuban rhythms and post-bop with rap – both Sampa the Great and 2022 Mercury nominee Kojey Radical are among the guests – dub, funk and dance music and transforms Sun Ra's Love In Outer Space into slick jazz-inflected soul with a vocal by the singer Nao, another former Mercury nominee. It's an album where the influence of spiritual jazz coexists with Afrobeat; it successfully captures the band's live energy, its kinetic power never dipping despite its 70-minute running time. It's approachable and celebratory without in any way seeming lightweight or drifting too far from the band's roots: an album that people who don't normally consider themselves jazz fans might fall for, but still resolutely a jazz album."

Ezra Collective's 2024 single "God Gave Me Feet for Dancing" was selected by Barack Obama for his list of 25 favourite tracks of 2024.

In January 2025, Ezra Collective were announced as the runners-up in the BBC's Sound of 2025 poll. At the 2025 BRIT Awards, they were nominated for four awards, winning Group of the Year, the first jazz act to do so.

On 28 June, Ezra Collective performed at Glastonbury Festival 2025.

The band released their album Here Because of Hope on 11 September 2026. It debuted number 1 on the Official Albums Chart.

== Discography ==
=== Studio albums ===
List of studio albums, with selected details and chart positions
Title	Details	Peak chart positions						Sales
Title	Details	UK	UK Ind.	UK Jazz	AUS	NLD	SCO	Sales
You Can't Steal My Joy	Released: 26 April 2019; Label: Enter the Jungle; Format: CD, digital download, vinyl	70	9	1	—	—	80	UK: 19,070
Where I'm Meant to Be	Released: 4 November 2022; Label: Partisan; Format: CD, digital download, vinyl	24	3	1	—	—	9	UK: 41,601
Dance, No One's Watching	Released: 27 September 2024; Label: Partisan; Format: CD, digital download, vinyl	7	2	1	—	—	6	UK: 42,090
Here Because of Hope	Released: 11 September 2026; Label: Partisan; Format: CD, digital download, vinyl	1	1	1	94	78	1	

=== EPs ===
- Chapter 7 (2016)
- Juan Pablo: The Philosopher (2018)
- Joy to the World (2025)

== Awards and nominations ==
Organisation	Year	Work	Category	Result	Ref.
MOBO Awards	2022	Ezra Collective	Best Jazz Act	Won	
Mercury Prize	2023	Where I'm Meant to Be	Album of the Year	Won	
MOBO Awards	2024	Ezra Collective	Best Jazz Act	Won	
BBC	2025	Ezra Collective	Sound of 2025	Second	
Berlin Music Video Awards	2025	"God Gave Me Feet For Dancing (ft. Yazmin Lacey)"	Best Performer	Nominated	
Brit Awards	2025	Ezra Collective	Group Of The Year	Won	
