= Voice Notes (album) =

Studio album by Yazmin Lacey
- Released: 3 March 2023
- Genre: Neo soul; dub; R&B
- Length: 61:41
- Label: Own Your Own; Believe

Singles from Voice Notes
- 1. "Pieces" Released: 7 September 2022; 2. "Bad Company" Released: 10 November 2022; 3. "Late Night People" Released: 18 January 2023

Voice Notes is the debut studio album by English singer-songwriter Yazmin Lacey. It was released on 3 March 2023 on Own Your Own Records in partnership with Believe Music.

== Background and release ==
Yazmin Lacey's debut full-length album, Voice Notes derives its title and inspiration from a series of voice memos and reminders Lacey kept in her phone. The album's first track "Flylo Tweet" is inspired by a tweet from American musician Flying Lotus discussing self-consciousness and fear of failure, which are themes of the album. Lacey announced the release of Voice Notes on 11 October 2022 alongside the album's second single "Bad Company".

In April 2023, Lacey released a companion short film for Voice Notes directed by Kevin Morosky, featuring the tracks "From a Lover", "Bad Company", and "Legacy" from the album.

== Critical reception ==
Professional ratings
Aggregate scores
| Source | Rating |
|---|---|
| Metacritic | 89/100 |
Review scores
| Source | Rating |
| AllMusic | 4/5 stars |
| Clash | 8/10 |
| The Observer | 5/5 stars |
| Uncut | 8/10 |

Voice Notes was released to critical acclaim. At Metacritic, the album received an aggregate score of 89 based on 4 reviews, indicating "universal acclaim".

In a five-star review for The Observer, writer Kadish Morris called Voice Notes "an escapist, feelgood project" that "seamlessly blends jazz, soul and electronica without overpowering the singer-songwriter’s supple vocals." The Fader praised the album upon its release, writing that Lacey "pulls quite a few pages from the neo-soul songbook, but her personal style is greater than the sum of its Baduistic flairs."

Andy Kellman of AllMusic gave the album four out of five stars, writing: "Lacey's reflections and observations on life and love are typically lucid and conversational. More often, they carry an immediacy befitting the album's title, and the singer's easygoing nature is always evident, her voice consistently mellow if always enchanting." Pitchfork included the album on a "Great Records You May Have Missed" list, with reviewer Gio Santiago writing that the album "traverses jazz, neo-soul, dub, and R&B with the intimacy of a dimly-lit open mic session."

== Track listing ==
| No. | Title | Length |
|---|---|---|
| 1. | "Flylo Tweet" | 2:00 |
| 2. | "Bad Company" | 3:38 |
| 3. | "Late Night People" | 5:34 |
| 4. | "Fool's Gold" | 3:47 |
| 5. | "Where Did You Go?" | 6:21 |
| 6. | "Sign and Signal" | 4:22 |
| 7. | "From a Lover" | 2:55 |
| 8. | "Eye to Eye" | 4:37 |
| 9. | "Pieces" | 5:48 |
| 10. | "Pass It Back" | 6:24 |
| 11. | "Tomorrow's Child" | 3:37 |
| 12. | "Match in My Pocket" | 2:56 |
| 13. | "Legacy" | 3:32 |
| 14. | "Sea Glass" | 6:10 |
| Total length: | | 61:41 |
