= Moses Boyd =

British jazz musician (born 1991)

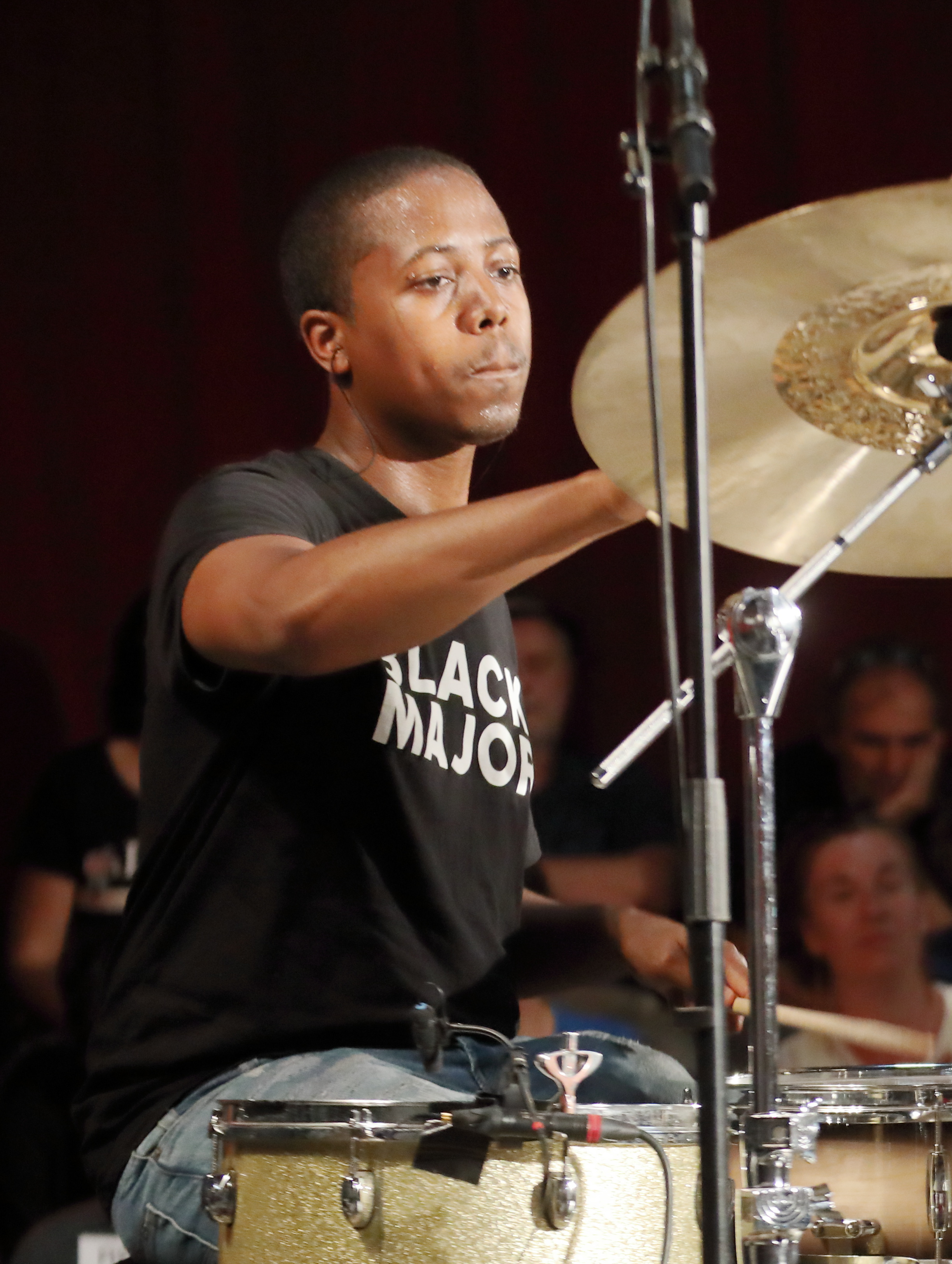
- Boyd in 2019

Background information
- Born: 30 April 1991 (age 35); Catford, London, England
- Genres: Jazz; nu-jazz; electro jazz; fusion; jazz rock
- Occupations: Drummer; composer; record producer; electronic musician; radio host; bandleader
- Instrument: Drums
- Years active: 2014–present
- Labels: Exodus; Gearbox
- Website: mosesboyd.co.uk

Moses Boyd (born 30 April 1991) is a British jazz drummer, composer, record producer, bandleader and radio host. His debut solo studio album Dark Matter (2020) was nominated for the 2020 Mercury Prize.

In 2014, Boyd and saxophonist Binker Golding formed the duo Binker & Moses and released three consecutive albums, with accolades including one MOBO Award, two Jazz FM Awards and a Parliamentary Jazz Award. In 2022, Binker & Moses released their fourth album, Feeding the Machine, to critical acclaim.

Boyd's self-titled jazz band Moses Boyd Exodus (also known as the Exodus) released several mixtapes in the mid-2010s and together have recorded most of Boyd's solo releases. The group consists of Theon Cross (tubist), Artie Zaitz (guitarist), Binker Golding (saxophonist) and Nathaniel Cross (trombonist).

Under his own label, Exodus Records, Boyd made his solo debut with the extended play Absolute Zero in 2017, and followed it up with Displaced Diaspora in 2018. He has additionally collaborated with musicians such as Beyoncé, Little Simz, Lonnie Liston Smith, Zara McFarlane, Obongjayar, Ed Motta, Sons of Kemet, Soweto Kinch, Floating Points, Four Tet and Theon Cross.

== Early life ==
Boyd was born and raised in the district of Catford in south London, England. He describes himself as a "second-generation West Indian" with Dominican descent from his father and Jamaican descent from his mother. He attended Sedgehill School, which was where he began learning drums. Boyd claims that at one point he was taught drums by Bobby Worth. In 2016, he graduated from Trinity Laban Conservatoire of Music and Dance with a Bachelor of Music degree in jazz drums. While at Trinity Laban, he took part of the jazz education programme Tomorrow's Warriors.

== Other ventures ==
In addition to music, Boyd was a resident host throughout 2019 on BBC Radio 1Xtra. He also performed a few stints filling in for Gilles Peterson on BBC Radio 6 Music in mid 2020.

In March 2026, Boyd was announced by Tomorrow's Warriors as one of the organisation's inaugural patrons, alongside Baroness Amos, Margaret Busby, Guy Chambers, Robert Elms, Nick Hornby, Lizzie Ridding and John Ridding, Michael Watt, Richard Wyatt, Femi Koleoso, Eska.

== Artistry and reception ==
=== Musical style ===
Boyd is popularly known for blending multiple genres into jazz to create various new sub-genres. He has been noted to perform and write in the styles of nu-jazz, and fusion, additionally incorporating elements of grime, electronica, highlife and broken beat. Boyd has described his own music as "an extension of black music, the diaspora" that draws influence from afrobeats, soca, reggae, drum and bass and jungle music.

=== Critical reception ===
Boyd is known as a prominent figure within the modern London jazz scene. He has been described by The Guardian as "a progenitor of the current London jazz scene", and "a poster boy of the London jazz revival."

=== Influences ===
Boyd has cited Miles Davis's Kind of Blue (1959) and Dizzee Rascal's Boy in Da Corner (2003) as major influences. Boyd is closely associated with jazz personality and DJ Gilles Peterson, whom he cites as an influence in learning how to "use jazz in club culture".

== Discography ==
=== Studio albums ===
Title	Details	Peak chart positions			
Title	Details	UK Jazz	UK Indie	UK Breakers	SCO
Dark Matter	Released: 14 February 2020; Label: Exodus Records; Formats: LP, digital download, streaming	2	7	1	52
Songs for Sinners	Released: 30 October 2026; Label: Exodus Records, Beggars Music; Formats: LP, digital download, streaming	2	31	11	—

=== Collaborative albums ===
Title	Details	Peak chart positions		
Title	Details	UK Jazz	UK Indie	UK Breakers
Safe and Sound (as part of The Peter Edwards Trio)	Released: 31 March 2014; Label: Self-released; Compact disc, digital download, streaming	—	—	—
Dem Ones (as Binker & Moses)	Released: 31 May 2015; Label: Gearbox; Formats: LP, digital download, streaming	—	—	—
A Matter of Instinct (as part of The Peter Edwards Trio)	Released: 17 June 2016; Label: Self-released; Compact disc, digital download, streaming	—	—	—
Journey to the Mountain of Forever (as Binker & Moses)	Released: 2 June 2017; Label: Gearbox; Formats: LP, digital download, streaming	3	42	11
Alive in the East? (as Binker & Moses)	Released: 22 June 2018; Label: Gearbox; Formats: LP, digital download, streaming	15	—	17
Displaced Diaspora (with Moses Boyd Exodus) (Note: Boyd has received primary credit, despite the album being a collaborative project.)	Released: 28 September 2018; Label: Exodus; Formats: LP, digital download, streaming	—	—	—
Feeding the Machine (as Binker & Moses)	Released: 25 February 2022; Label: Gearbox; Formats: LP, digital download, streaming	—	—	—

=== Extended plays ===
- Absolute Zero (2017)

=== Mixtapes ===
- Footsteps Of Our Fathers (with Moses Boyd Exodus) (2015)
- Time and Space (with Moses Boyd Exodus) (2016)

=== Singles ===
==== As lead artist ====
List of singles as lead artist, with year and album
Title	Year	Album
As Moses Boyd
"Rye Lane Shuffle"	2016	Non-album singles
"Drum Dance"	2016	Non-album singles
"Frontline" (featuring Kevin Haynes Grupo Elegua)	2018	Displaced Diaspora
"Stranger than Fiction"	2019	Dark Matter
"Only You"	2019	Dark Matter
"Shades of You" (featuring Poppy Ajudha)	2020	Dark Matter
As Binker & Moses
"Intoxication from the Jahvmonisi Leaves"	2017	Journey to the Mountain of Forever
"The Valley of the Ultra Blacks"	2017	Journey to the Mountain of Forever
"Trees on Fire"	2017	Journey to the Mountain of Forever
"Echoes from the Other Side of the Mountain"	2017	Journey to the Mountain of Forever
"Fete by the River"	2017	Alive in the East?
"Children of the Ultra Blacks"	2018	Alive in the East?
"The Birth of Light"	2018	Alive in the East?
"How Land Learnt to Be Still"	2018	Alive in the East?
"The River's Tale"	2018	Alive in the East?

==== As featured artist ====
List of singles as featured artist, with year and album
Title	Year	Album
As Moses Boyd
"Untitled" (Mura Masa featuring Moses Boyd)	2017	Non-album single
"Pineapple" (Blue Lab Beats featuring Moses Boyd and Nerija)	2017	Xover
"Drumming" (DJ Lag featuring Moses Boyd)	2018	Stampit - EP
As Binker & Moses
"Village of the Sun" (Village Of The Sun featuring Binker & Moses and Simon Ratcliffe)	2020	Non-album singles
"Ted" (Village Of The Sun featuring Binker & Moses and Simon Ratcliffe)	2020	Non-album singles

=== Guest appearances ===
Title	Year	Other performer(s)	Album/EP
"Mãos À Obra"	2016	Sonzeira	Tam Tam Tam Reimagined
"Nana Nada"	2016	Sonzeira	Tam Tam Tam Reimagined
"Nós Precisamos De Você"	2016	Sonzeira	Tam Tam Tam Reimagined
"The Balance"	2018	Various Artists	We Out Here (comp.)
"Dawn"	2018	DJ Khalab	Black Noise 2084
"Black Opus"	2018	Louis VI, Pete Johnson	Sugar Like Salt
"Track 7-ish"	2018	Louis VI, Pete Johnson	Sugar Like Salt
"Battle" (as part of Binker & Moses)	2019	Ashley Henry	Beautiful Vinyl Hunter

=== Songwriting, production and performance credits ===
Adapted from Discogs, Tidal, and AllMusic.

Year	Album	Artist	Title(s)	Role
2014	If You Know Her	Zara McFarlane	"Move"	Drummer
2015	Stories & Rhymes	Jasmine Powers	—N/a	Drummer
2015	Aspirations - EP	Theon Cross	—N/a	Drummer, mixer
2015	Arise	Zara McFarlane	All tracks	Composer, percussionist, vocalist
2016	Tam Tam Tam Reimagined	Sonzeira	"Mãos À Obra"; "Nós Precisamos De Você" and "Nana Nada"	Drummer
2016	Oscar Jerome	Oscar Jerome	All tracks	Drummer
2017	Escapee	Daniel Casimir	—N/a	Drummer
2017	—N/a	Zara McFarlane	"All Africa"	Bassist, producer
2017	Nubya's 5ive	Nubya Garcia	"Fly Free"; "Contemplation" and "Free Sun"	Drummer
2017	Peace Begins Within	Zara McFarlane	"Peace Begins Within" (both original and reggae versions)	Arranger
2018	Your Queen Is a Reptile	Sons of Kemet	"My Queen Is Harriet Tubman"; ""My Queen Is Yaa Asantewaa" and "My Queen Is Albertina Sisulu"	Drummer
2018	Xover	Blue Lab Beats	"Pineapple" and "Xover"	Composer and producer
2018	Starting Today	Joe Armon-Jones	"Starting Today"; "Almost Went Too Far"; "Mollison Dub"; "London's Face"; "Ragify" and "Outro (Forrow)"	Drummer
2018	Where Are Your Branches?	Oscar Jerome, James Massiah	"Smile On A Screen"	Drummer
2018	Sugar Like Salt	Louis VI	"Black Opus" and "Track 7-ish"	Drummer
2018	Fyah	Theon Cross	"Panda Village"	Drummer, producer
2019	The Mage	Greg Foat	"Of My Hands"; "Endless Love" and "The Magic Radish"	Drummer
2019	—N/a	Zara McFarlane, Dennis Bovell	"East of the River Nile" (both original and alt. takes and their respective dub mixes)	Drummer
2019	Kolmar	Max de Wardener	All tracks	Drummer
2019	Turn to Clear View	Joe Armon-Jones, Asheber, Georgia Anne Muldrow, Jehst, Obongjayar	"Try To Walk With Me"; "Yellow Dandelion"; "The Leo & Aquarius" and "Self:Love"	Drummer
2019	Beautiful Vinyl Hunter	Ashley Henry	"Realisations" and "Battle"	Drummer
2019	The Lion King: The Gift	Beyoncé, Tierra Whack, Moonchild Sanelly, Nija, Busiswa, Yemi Alade	"My Power"	Producer
2020	Symphonie Pacifique	Greg Foat	"Prelude"; "Symphonie Pacifique"; "Undulation"; "Anticipation"; "Mu"; "Yonaguni"; "Island Life"; "Nikinakinu" and "Man Vs. Machine"	Drummer, composer
2020	let all the poisons that lurk in the mud seep out	Yves Tumor, Kelsey Lu, and Kelly Moran	"let all the poisons that lurk in the mud seep out"	Drummer, composer
2020	As we stand	Tori Handlsey	All tracks	Drummer
2020	Morning Matters	Yazmin Lacey	"Morning Sunrise" and "Lately (Interlude)"	Producer
2021	Boxed In	Daniel Casimir	All tracks	Drummer

== Awards and nominations ==
Organization	Year (Note: Indicates the year of ceremony. Each year is linked to the article about the awards held that year, wherever possible.)	Recipient(s) and nominee(s)	Award	Result	Ref.
AIM Independent Music Awards	2020	Himself	UK Breakthrough of the Year	Won	
AIM Independent Music Awards	2020	Dark Matter	Best Independent Album	Nominated	
AIM Independent Music Awards	2020	Dark Matter Vinyl (Dinked Edition)	Best Creative Packaging	Nominated	
Jazz FM Awards	2016	Binker & Moses	Breakthrough Act of the Year	Won	
Jazz FM Awards	2016	Binker & Moses	UK Jazz Act of the Year	Won	
Jazz FM Awards	2019	Himself (credited for 1Xtra residency)	Digital Award	Nominated	
Jazz FM Awards	2020	Himself	Innovator Award	Nominated	
MOBO Awards	2015	Binker & Moses	Best Jazz Act	Won	
MOBO Awards	2017	Himself	Best Jazz Act	Won	
MOBO Awards	2020	Himself	Best Jazz Act	Pending	
Mercury Prize	2020	Dark Matter	Album of the Year	Nominated	
Parliamentary Jazz Awards	2016	Binker & Moses	Jazz Newcomer of the Year	Won	
PRS for Music Foundation	2015	Himself	Steve Reid InNOVAtion Award	Won	
UK Music Video Awards	2020	"Stranger Than Fiction"	Best Alternative Video - UK	Nominated	
Worldwide Awards	2016	Himself	John Peel Award	Won	
Worldwide Awards	2017	"Rye Lane Shuffle"	Track of the Year	Nominated	
Worldwide Awards	2017	Journey To The Mountain Of Forever	Jazz Album of the Year	Nominated	
Worldwide Awards	2018	Displaced Diaspora	Jazz Album of the Year	Nominated	
Worshipful Company of Musicians	2014	Himself	Jazz Young Musician Medal	Won	
