= When Rivers Meet =

English blues/rock band formed in 2016

- Origin: Essex, England
- Genres: Blues; rock
- Years active: 2016–present
- Label: One Road Records
- Members: Grace Bond (vocals, mandolin and violin); Aaron Bond (vocals and guitar)
- Website: whenriversmeet.co.uk

When Rivers Meet (or WRM) is an English blues / rock band formed in 2016 in Essex, England, by husband-and-wife duo Grace and Aaron Bond.

In May 2021, they won four UK Blues Awards, for: Emerging Blues Artist of the Year; Blues Band of the Year; Blues Album of the Year; and Most Inspirational Online Performance of the Year.

== History ==
When Rivers Meet (or WRM) was formed in 2016 by husband and wife Grace and Aaron Bond.

They originally lived in Norfolk, England, and met at Downham Market, before moving to Brightlingsea in Essex. When they first met, Grace had been touring festivals with a Meat Loaf tribute act, and Aaron Bond had been playing in local rock bands. Before forming When Rivers Meet, they performed as Holmes and Bond, appearing at the Brightlingsea Free Music Festival in 2016.

The duo began touring the UK in their VW camper van in 2019, including a performance at the Great British Rock and Blues Festival in Skegness. However, in spring 2020 when the COVID-19 pandemic hit the UK and restrictions were imposed, they were forced to give up on the tour. Instead they focussed on online engagement and weekly livestreamed sessions on Facebook, which proved very popular and exceeded their expectations. In January 2021, Grace Bond told ITV News the livestreams had "over half a million views from a hundred different countries", which she described as "crazy". Grace Bond reported that during lockdown they had been spent their time "recording, live streaming, filming videos, or working something out online to do in between."

When Rivers Meet released their first EP, The Uprising, in April 2019 and a second EP, Innocence Of Youth, in May 2020. In November 2020 they brought out their debut album, We Fly Free.

On the album, Grace Bond performed vocals, mandolin and violin; Aaron Bond performed vocals and guitar (including slide guitar); and the duo were backed by Adam Bowers on bass, drums, organ and piano, and Robin G. Breeze on bass, organ and piano. Adam Bowers also produced the album, at The Boathouse Studio in rural Suffolk.

Tracks from their album We Fly Free were playlisted and featured on the Planet Rock national digital radio station in 2020 and 2021, and the band also received airplay on BBC Radio 2's The Rock Show with Johnnie Walker and The Blues Show with Cerys Matthews

In March 2021, it was announced that When Rivers Meet would be back on tour supporting the King King blues band's UK tour, beginning in October 2021.

== Reception ==
In October 2020, Paul H. Birch, writing for RAMzine summed-up his opinion of the band, stating: "Essentially, 4/4 boogie blues with folk rock ambiance, a modern-day female-fronted Medicine Head perhaps," adding that "One might think that over a series of songs things could get repetitive but there's a compelling intimacy that overcomes that, and it would be interesting where that leads them creatively in the future."

Writing about the track "Battleground" in October 2020, Martine Ehrenclou of Rock & Blues Muse opined that Grace Bond has "a killer voice", with "Aaron providing solid backing vocals and guitar", and "drummer Adam Bowers locking it down", to create "a vintage rock and roll sound with a contemporary twist."

In November 2020, Henry Yates in Classic Rock magazine, writing about the album We Fly Free stated that: "[This] British husband-and-wife are heavy enough to get your attention and quirky enough to hold it, with songs that give you a kicking but leave a boot-print on your heart."

A reviewer at Metal Planet Music writes in November 2020 that the album We Fly Free is "a collection of extremely well written songs;" that Grace Bond's singing possesses "great range and clarity"; and that Aaron Bond's guitar work has a "great sound" and that he "knows when to keep it simple, to let the vocal and story shine and when to then let go and give it some.

Describing We Fly Free, in May 2021 Adam Kennedy wrote in HRH Magazine: "It's got that old school sound, but with a bit of a contemporary twist," and he sums-up the album by saying: "For blues lovers 'We Fly Free' is a purist's paradise."

== Interviews ==
- Bond, Grace; Bond, Aaron (28 December 2020). "When Rivers Meet Interview". Blues Rock Review (Interview). Interviewed by Pete Francis. Archived from the original on 23 May 2021.

== Accolades and awards ==
In December 2020, Blues Rock Review listed We Fly Free ninth in their Top 20 Albums of 2020.

In May 2021, When Rivers Meet won four UKBlues Awards, for: Emerging Blues Artist of the Year; Blues Band of the Year; Blues Album of the Year; and Most Inspirational Online Performance of the Year.

== Personal life ==
Aaron Bond was born in Downham Market, Norfolk, England, and Grace Holmes is originally from Ely, Cambridgeshire. They met at Bond's local pub in Downham Market, where Holmes had just started working as a bar steward, and now live in the coastal town of Brightlingsea, Essex, near Colchester. They have been together since 2004.

== Discography ==
=== Studio albums ===
- Liberty (2017)
- We Fly Free (2020)
- Saving Grace (2021) – No. 84 UK Albums Chart
- Aces Are High (2023) – No. 9 UK Albums Chart
- Addicted to You (2025) – No. 4 UK Albums Chart
- Rhythm Rust & Static (2026) – No. 20 UK Albums Chart

=== Live albums ===
- Flying Free Tour - Live (2022)
- Breaker of Chains Tour - Live (2024)
- Live in London '24 (2024)
- Red Rum Duo Tour Tour - Live (2024)

=== Compilations ===
- The EP Collection (2020)
- The Story So Far... Highlights Vol.1 (2024)

=== Others ===
- The Boathouse Sessions (2022)

=== Extended plays ===
- The Uprising (2019)
- Innocence of Youth (2020)

=== Singles ===
- "Christmas Is Here" (2022)
- "Play My Game" (2023)
- "Golden" (2024)
- "Addicted to You" (2025)
