= Where I'm Meant to Be =

Studio album by Ezra Collective
- Released: 4 November 2022
- Genre: Jazz
- Length: 68:34
- Label: Partisan
- Producer: Ezra Collective, Riccardo Damian

Ezra Collective chronology
You Can't Steal My Joy (2019)	Where I'm Meant to Be (2022)	Dance, No One's Watching (2024)

Singles from Where I'm Meant to Be
- 1. "Victory Dance" Released: 7 June 2022; 2. "Life Goes On" Released: 24 August 2022; 3. "Ego Killah" Released: 22 September 2022; 4. "No Confusion" Released: 1 November 2022

Where I'm Meant to Be is the second studio album by the London jazz quintet Ezra Collective, released on 4 November 2022 by Partisan Records. The album was produced by the band and Riccardo Damian, and features musicians including Sampa the Great, Kojey Radical, Emeli Sandé, and Nao, as well as the filmmaker Steve McQueen.

The album received a positive reception from critics. It won the Mercury Prize in 2023 and was nominated for Best Jazz Record at the 2023 Libera Awards. It debuted at number one on the UK's Jazz & Blues chart, spending six non-consecutive weeks at the top spot.

== Background and release ==
On 7 June 2022, Partisan Records announced they had signed the group and released their first single with the label, "Victory Dance", which came with the group's first official music video directed by Femi Ladi. The album was announced on 24 August for a 4 November release date, along with the release of the second single, "Life Goes On" featuring Sampa the Great. "Life Goes On" came with a music video directed by Nathan Miller which was shot in London and Lusaka. The third single, "Ego Killah", was released on 22 September with an official visualiser. The fourth single, "No Confusion" featuring Kojey Radical, was released on 1 November with a music video directed by Douglas Bernardt.

The album's cover art is a photograph of a studio in South London. The image is filled with items including musical instruments and things the band take inspiration from. It also includes a selection of personally important items, such as a Kazakhstani flag representing a time they performed a concert in the country, and a Fela Kuti record. The image was inspired by the cover of Thelonious Monk's Underground.

On 11 November, the album debuted at the top of the Official Charts Company's UK Jazz & Blues Albums Chart and at 24 on the UK Albums Chart. The album spent six non-consecutive weeks at number one on the jazz chart.

== Reception ==
Where I'm Meant to Be ratings
Aggregate scores
Source	Rating
AnyDecentMusic?	7.8/10
Metacritic	84/100
Review scores
Source	Rating
AllMusic	4/5 stars
Clash	9/10
The Daily Telegraph	4/5 stars
Gigwise	7/10 stars
The Guardian	5/5 stars
Loud and Quiet	7/10
Mojo	4/5 stars
Record Collector	4/5 stars
The Skinny	4/5 stars
Uncut	7/10

According to the review aggregator Metacritic, Where I'm Meant to Be received "universal acclaim" based on a weighted average score of 84 out of 100 from 8 critic scores.

=== Accolades ===
==== Awards and nominations ====
Where I'm Meant to Be awards and nominations
Year	Organisation	Award	Nominee	Result	Ref.
2023	Libera Awards	Best Jazz Record	Where I'm Meant to Be	Nominated	
2023	Mercury Prize	—	Where I'm Meant to Be	Won	
2023	AIM Independent Music Awards	Best Creative Campaign	Where I'm Meant to Be	Won	
2023	AIM Independent Music Awards	Best Independent Video	"No Confusion"	Nominated	
2024	MOBO Awards	Album of the Year	Where I'm Meant to Be	Nominated	
2024	AIM Independent Music Awards	Best Independent Remix	"Joy (Life Goes On) (Joy Anonymous Remix)"	Won	

==== Year-end lists ====
Where I'm Meant to Be on year-end lists
Publication	No.	Ref.
Clash	36	
Double J (2023)	20	
The Economist	—	
Far Out	37	

== Track listing ==
All tracks are written by Ife Ogunjobi, Joe Armon-Jones, James Mollison, Femi Koleoso, and TJ Koleoso, unless otherwise stated.

Where I'm Meant to Be track listing
No.	Title	Writer(s)	Length
1.	"Life Goes On" (featuring Sampa the Great)	Fela Aníkúlápó Kuti; Ogunjobi; Armon-Jones; Mollison; F. Koleoso; Sampa Tembo; T. Koleoso	3:24
2.	"Victory Dance"		4:56
3.	"No Confusion" (featuring Kojey Radical)	Ogunjobi; Armon-Jones; Mollison; Kwadwo Adu Genfi Amponsah; F. Koleoso; T. Koleoso	3:14
4.	"Welcome to My World"		7:14
5.	"Togetherness"		4:34
6.	"Ego Killah"		5:55
7.	"Smile"	Charles Chaplin; Geoffrey Parsons; John Turner	5:03
8.	"Live Strong"		7:37
9.	"Siesta" (featuring Emeli Sandé)	Sandé; Ogunjobi; Armon-Jones; Mollison; F. Koleoso; T. Koleoso	5:48
10.	"Words by Steve"	F. Koleoso; Steve McQueen	1:48
11.	"Belonging"		5:57
12.	"Never the Same Again"		6:43
13.	"Words by TJ"	T. Koleoso	0:39
14.	"Love in Outer Space" (featuring Nao)	Sun Ra	5:41
Total length:			68:34

== Personnel ==
=== Ezra Collective ===
- Femi Koleoso – drums (1–9, 11, 12, 14), vocals (10)
- TJ Koleoso – bass guitar (1–9, 11, 12, 14), vocals (13)
- Ife Ogunjobi – trumpet (1–9, 11, 12, 14)
- James Mollison – saxophone (1–9, 11, 12, 14)
- Joe Armon-Jones – keyboards (1–9, 11, 12, 14)

=== Additional musicians ===
- Junior Alli-Balogun – percussion (1–9, 11, 12, 14)
- Sampa the Great – vocals (1)
- Kojey Radical – vocals (3)
- Benjamin Totten and Oluwatobi Adenaike-Johnson – guitar (3, 4, 9)
- Jorja Smith – vocals (5)
- Mark Mollison – guitar (6, 11)
- Wayne Urquhart – cello (7, 8, 11, 12)
- Stella Page – viola (7, 8, 11, 12)
- Antonia Pagulatos, Athalie Armon-Jones, and Sam Kennedy – violin (7, 8, 11, 12)
- Angel Silvera – vocals (9, 14)
- Emeli Sandé, Louise LaBelle, and Teni Tinks – vocals (9)
- Steve McQueen – vocals (10)
- Nao and Petra Luke – vocals (14)

=== Technical ===
- Ezra Collective – producers
- Riccardo Damian – producer
- Jess Camilleri – engineering (9)
- Tris Ellis – engineering (14)
- TJ Koleoso – programming (9)

== Charts ==
Chart performance for Where I'm Meant to Be
Chart (2022–2024)	Peak position
Scottish Albums (OCC)	9
UK Albums (OCC)	24
UK Independent Albums (OCC)	3
UK Jazz & Blues Albums (OCC)	1
