= Nubya Garcia =

British jazz musician (born 1991)

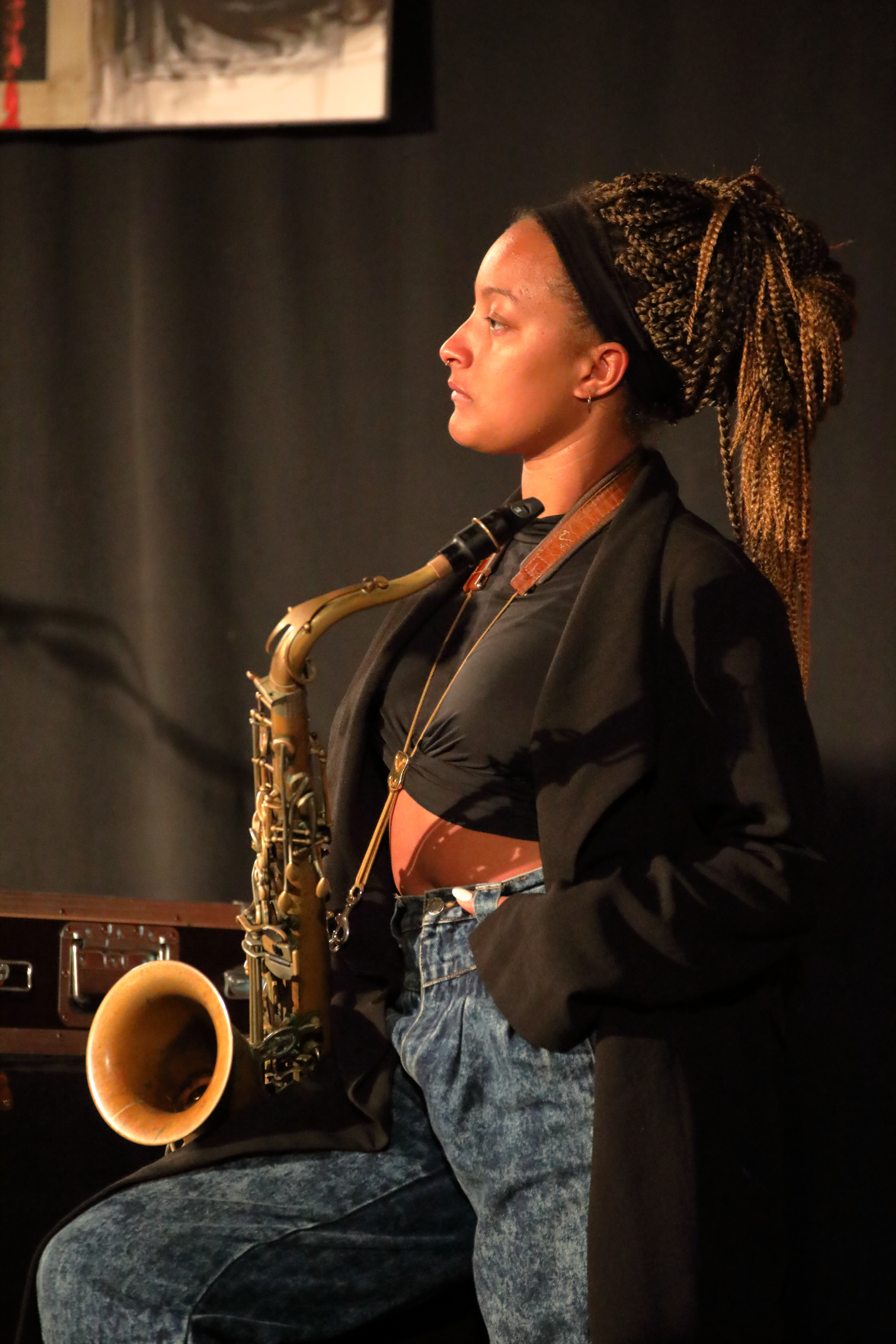
- Garcia at INNtöne Jazzfestival 2019

Background information
- Born: Nubya Nyasha Garcia; 1991 (age 34–35); Camden Town, London, England
- Education: Trinity Laban Conservatoire of Music and Dance
- Genre: Jazz
- Occupations: Jazz saxophonist, composer and bandleader
- Instruments: Tenor saxophone
- Years active: 2017–present
- Labels: Jazz re:freshed; Domino; Concord Jazz
- Website: nubyagarcia.com

Nubya Nyasha Garcia (born 1991) is a British jazz musician, saxophonist, composer and bandleader.

== Early life and education ==
Garcia was born in 1991 in Camden Town, London, the youngest of four siblings, to a Guyanese mother, a former civil servant, and a British Trinidadian filmmaker father.

Garcia followed her three older siblings to the local Camden Saturday Music Centre at the age of five, where she first learned the violin and later played the viola in the London Schools Symphony Orchestra (LSSO). Garcia's upbringing by her stepdad, a brass player, and music-loving mother, coupled with the music activities at Camden School for Girls, meant she was exposed to multiple genres of music.

Garcia began learning the saxophone at the age of 10, with Vicky Wright. Garcia became a member of the Camden Jazz Band, directed by jazz pianist Nikki Yeoh, before joining the junior jazz programme at the Royal Academy of Music. She attended youth music workshops at the Roundhouse in Camden and also Tomorrow's Warriors under the direction of Gary Crosby.

While still at school, she received a scholarship for a five-week summer programme at the Berklee College of Music in Boston. During her gap year, she studied with former Jazz Messengers member Jean Toussaint. In 2016, Garcia graduated with honours from the Trinity Laban Conservatoire of Music and Dance, in Jazz Performance. Among her graduating class were Joe Armon-Jones and Moses Boyd.

== Career ==
In 2017, Garcia released her debut EP Nubya's 5ive via the label Jazz re:freshed. That year, her band was an opening act at Gilles Peterson's Worldwide Festival in Sète; the following year, she played at the NYC Winter Jazz Festival and the JazzFest Berlin.

In her 2018 EP When We Are, Garcia explored how electronics can be used in a live jazz environment; the EP was created with the support of the Steve Reid InNOVAtion Award, a development project between PRS Foundation and Steve Reid Foundation. She is also a member of the collective Nérija and the Afro-jazz ensemble Maisha. She appeared on a 2018 Clash list of "women pushing UK jazz forward".

Garcia has performed at festivals in the UK including Love Supreme Jazz Festival and NN North Sea Jazz Festival. She has headlined sell-out shows at Ronnie Scott's Jazz Club. Since November 2017 Garcia has held monthly radio residency as a DJ on NTS Radio.

Garcia released her debut studio album Source in August 2020 on the Concord Jazz label. The album was listed on several end of 2020 top album lists. In July 2021, Garcia's album Source was shortlisted for the 2021 Mercury Prize. In December 2020, Garcia joined a band of British jazz musicians called London Brew to play on the Bitches Brew-inspired self-titled album, which was announced for release on 31 March 2023 by Concord Jazz.

Nubya Garcia debuted her band on 18 August at the 2021 BBC Proms held in London's Royal Albert Hall. The Daily Telegraph gave the performance a five-star review.

On 15 September 2023, at the Royal Festival Hall, Garcia performed with the Nu Civilisation Orchestra (NCO) their exploration of Stan Getz's 1962 album Focus, in a well-reviewed concert.

Garcia release her third album entitled Odyssey in September 2024.

== Musical influences ==
Garcia has cited the prominent jazz saxophonists Dexter Gordon, Sonny Rollins and John Coltrane, as well as trumpeter Miles Davis and pianist-composer Mary Lou Williams, as her "musical heroes". She included Steel Pulse, a UK-based reggae band from Birmingham, among her musical inspirations.

== Charitable work ==
Garcia is a patron of the Camden Music Trust.

== Discography ==
=== Albums ===
- Nubya's 5ive (2017)
- Source (2020)
- Odyssey (2024)

=== Singles and EPs ===
- "When We Are" EP (2018)
- "Pace" single (2020)
- "Source" single (2020)

== Awards and nominations ==
Year	Organisation/Award	Category	Result	Ref
2017	PRS Foundation	Steve Reid Innovation Award	Won	
	British Jazz Awards	Rising Star	Nominated	
	Jazz FM Awards	UK Breakthrough Act	Nominated	
2018	Jazz FM Awards	UK Breakthrough Act	Won	
	South Bank Sky Arts Award	Times Breakthrough Act	Won	
	British Jazz Awards	Rising Star	Nominated	
2019	Jazz FM Awards	UK Jazz Act of the Year	Won	
	Jazz FM Awards	EFG London Jazz Festival Live Experience of the Year	Nominated	
2020	Parliamentary Jazz Awards	Jazz Instrumentalist of the Year	Nominated	
	Urban Music Awards	Best Jazz Act	Nominated	
2021	Parliamentary Jazz Awards	Jazz Instrumentalist of the Year	Won	
	Parliamentary Jazz Awards	Jazz Album of the Year	Nominated	
	Urban Music Awards	Best Jazz Act	Nominated	
	Jazz FM Awards	Album of the year	Nominated	
	Mercury Prize	Album of the Year	Nominated	
	JTI Award	JTI Trier Jazz Award	Won	
2024	Rolling Stone UK Awards	The Artist Award	Nominated	
2026	MOBO Awards	Best Jazz Act	Nominated	
