= Olaudah Equiano =

Black British abolitionist and writer (c. 1745 – 1797)

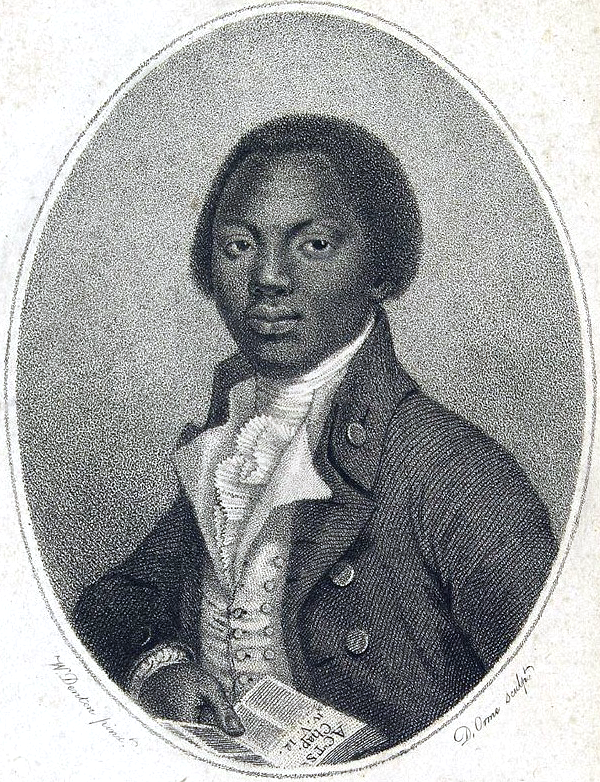
- Portrait by Daniel Orme, 1789
- Born: c. 1745; Essaka, Igboland
- Died: 31 March 1797 (aged 52); Westminster, Middlesex, United Kingdom
- Other names: Gustavus Vassa, Jacob, Michael
- Occupations: Sailor; Writer; Merchant
- Known for: Influence on British abolitionists, The Interesting Narrative of the Life of Olaudah Equiano
- Spouse: Susannah Cullen (m. 1792; died 1796)
- Children: Anna Maria Vassa; Joanna Vassa

Olaudah Equiano (/ə.ˈlaʊ.də/; c. 1745 – 31 March 1797), known for most of his life as Gustavus Vassa (/ˈvæ.sə/), was a writer who, drawing on his experiences as an enslaved African in the Americas, became a celebrated figure within the abolitionist movement in Great Britain and Ireland. According to his memoir, he was kidnapped from his home in West Africa (a village in what is now southern Nigeria) and shipped first to Barbados and then to Virginia. There he was bought by a Royal Navy officer whom he accompanied, during the Seven Years' War, as a valet. He was sold twice more in the Caribbean before, having been permitted to trade on his own account, purchasing his freedom in 1766.

As a freedman in London, Equiano embraced the British abolitionist movement, in the 1780s becoming one of its Sons of Africa, Africans living in Britain active as speakers on the abolitionist circuit. His 1789 autobiography, The Interesting Narrative of the Life of Olaudah Equiano, went through nine editions in his lifetime, and is credited with helping shift opinion in favour of the British Slave Trade Act 1807, under which the Royal Navy was committed to the suppression of the Atlantic slave trade. As a member of the London Corresponding Society, he was also associated with the cause of democratic reform.

The Interesting Narrative was rediscovered by scholars in the late 20th century and remains a widely-cited primary source.

== Early life and enslavement ==
According to his 1789 memoir, Equiano was born around 1745 in the village of Essaka (thought to be Isseke in today's Anambra State, Nigeria). Professor Paul Lovejoy, in his 2025 publication, argues that Equiano was from the village of Usaka (Essaka), present day Ikwuano (Equiano) in Abia State as Igbos at the time of Olaudah's youth did not bear surnames. In the 4th, 1791, edition of his book, he is also described as a native of the Eboe (Igbo) province, and in addresses and correspondence variously described himself as an "African", an "Eboan African" and as an "oppressed Ethiopian".

He was the youngest of six surviving sons, and had a sister; their father owned many slaves. His older brothers had helped foil one attempt at kidnapping of children in his village, but at the age eleven, alone in the family compound, he and his sister were seized. Separated and sold to slave traders, he was trafficked a considerable distance, changing owners several times. Six months after he had been kidnapped, he arrived at the coast, where he was taken on board a European slave ship. With 244 other enslaved Africans, he was transported across the Atlantic Ocean to Barbados in the British West Indies. He and a few other slaves were then sent on for sale in the British colony of Virginia.

In Virginia, Equiano was bought by Michael Henry Pascal, a lieutenant in the Royal Navy. Pascal renamed the boy Gustavus Vassa after the 16th-century King of Sweden Gustav Vasa. Equiano had already been renamed twice: he had been called Michael on board the slave ship that brought him to the Americas and Jacob by his first owner. This time Equiano protested, telling Pascal that he would prefer to be called Jacob. His resistance, he says, "gained me many a cuff" and eventually he submitted to the new name. He used this name for the rest of his life, including on all official records; he used Equiano only in his autobiography.

Pascal took Equiano with him when he returned to England and had him accompany him as a valet during the Seven Years' War. Equiano was present at the siege of Louisbourg in 1758, the Battle of Lagos in 1759 and the capture of Belle Île in 1761. Also trained in seamanship, Equiano assisted the crews of the ships he was on in times of battle as a powder monkey. Pascal favoured Equiano and sent him to his sister-in-law in Great Britain so that he could attend school and learn to read and write. Equiano converted to Christianity and was baptised at St Margaret's, Westminster on 9 February 1759.

== Controversy over his origins ==
Vassa (Equiano) was recorded in the St Margaret parish register as "a Black, born in Carolina, 12 years old", and not, as Equiano suggests in his memoirs, a 14-year old born in Africa. Researching a new edition of Equiano's memoir, in 1999 Vincent Carretta at the University of Maryland cited the parish register, and a later 1773 ship's muster, as evidence that Equiano was indeed born in the American colonies, and that a childhood in Africa had been fictionalised for effect. Noting the number details in Equiano's narrative that Carretta was able to corroborate from alternate sources, other scholars are satisfied that the weight of evidence support an African birth. Autobiographies may "distort or exaggerate the truth", but historian Adam Hochschild proposes that "seldom is one crucial portion of a memoir totally fabricated and the remainder scrupulously accurate".

Equiano's origins had been questioned when his memoir was first appeared. In response, his new godparents, cousins of his master, Pascal, testified that when Equiano arrived in London they had to help teach him English.

== Release ==
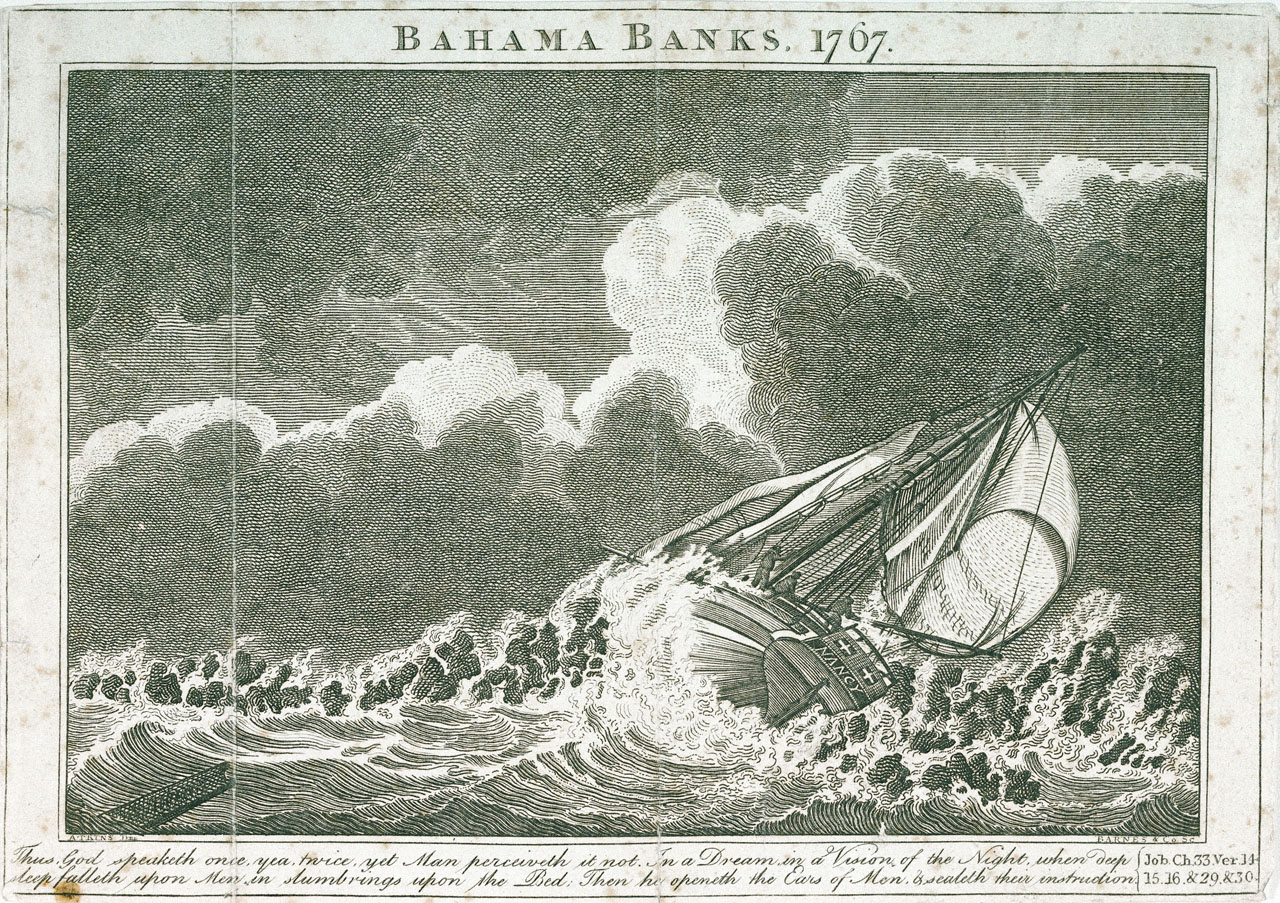
The wrecking of the Nancy on the Bahama Banks in 1767, from The Interesting Narrative of the Life of Olaudah Equiano, Or Gustavus Vassa, The African

In December 1762 Pascal sold Equiano to James Doran, the captain of the merchantman Charming Sally, at Gravesend, Kent. Onboard Charming Sally, Doran took Equiano to the British colony of Montserrat, where he was sold to Robert King, a Quaker merchant from Philadelphia who traded in the Caribbean.

Robert King forced Equiano to work on his shipping routes and in his stores. In 1765, when Equiano was about 20 years old, King promised that for his purchase price of 40 pounds (equivalent to £6,100 in 2025) he could buy his freedom.

King taught him to read and write more fluently, guided him along the path of religion, and allowed Equiano to engage in profitable trading for his own account, as well as on his owner's behalf. Equiano sold fruits, glass tumblers and other items between Georgia and the Caribbean islands. King allowed Equiano to buy his freedom, which he achieved in 1766. The merchant urged Equiano to stay on as a business partner. However, Equiano found it dangerous and limiting to remain in the British colonies as a freedman. While loading a ship in Georgia, he was almost kidnapped back into enslavement.

== Freedom ==
By about 1768, Equiano had gone to Britain. He continued to work at sea, travelling sometimes as a deckhand based in England. In 1773 on the Royal Navy ship HMS Racehorse, he travelled to the Arctic in an expedition towards the North Pole. On that voyage he worked with Dr Charles Irving, who had developed a process to distill seawater and later made a fortune from it. Two years later, Irving recruited Equiano for a project on the Mosquito Coast in Central America, where he was to use his African background to help select slaves and manage them as labourers on sugar-cane plantations. Irving and Equiano had a working relationship and friendship for more than a decade, but the plantation venture failed. Equiano met with George, the "Musquito king's son".

Equiano left the Mosquito Coast in 1776 and arrived at Plymouth, England, on 7 January 1777.

== Pioneer of the abolitionist cause ==
Equiano settled in London, where in the 1780s he became involved in the abolitionist movement. The movement to end the slave trade had been particularly strong among Quakers, but the Society for Effecting the Abolition of the Slave Trade was founded in 1787 as a non-denominational group, with Anglican members, in an attempt to influence parliament directly. Under the Test Act, only those prepared to receive holy communion according to the rites of the Church of England were permitted to serve as MPs. Equiano had been baptised into the Church of England in 1759; but had taken an interest in the evangelism of John Wesley (an abolitionist) to whose Methodism he had been introduced in America by George Whitefield.

As early as 1783, Equiano informed abolitionists such as Granville Sharp about the slave trade; that year he was the first to tell Sharp about the Zong massacre, which was being tried in London as litigation for insurance claims. It became a cause célèbre for the abolitionist movement and contributed to its growth.

On 21 October 1785 he was one of eight delegates from Africans in America to present an 'Address of Thanks' to the Quakers at a meeting in Gracechurch Street, London. The address referred to A Caution to Great Britain and her Colonies by Anthony Benezet, founder of the Society for the Relief of Free Negroes Unlawfully Held in Bondage.

Equiano was befriended and supported by abolitionists, many of whom encouraged him to write and publish his life story. He was supported financially in this effort by philanthropic abolitionists and religious benefactors, and many in the nobility subscribed to his book. His lectures and preparation for the book were promoted by, among others, Selina Hastings, Countess of Huntingdon.

== Memoir ==
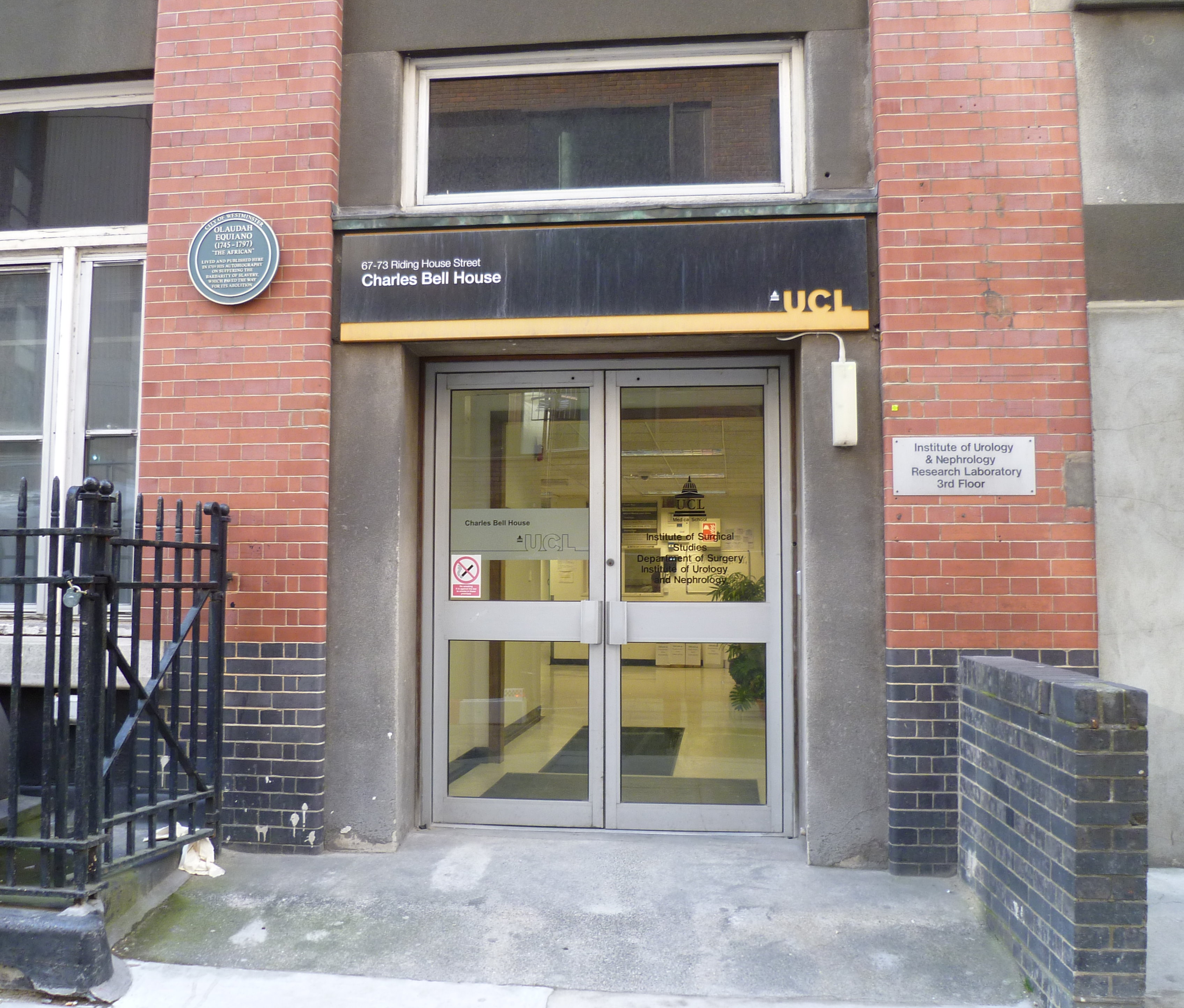
Plaque at Riding House Street, Westminster, noting the place where Equiano lived and published his narrative

Entitled The Interesting Narrative of the Life of Olaudah Equiano, or Gustavus Vassa, the African (1789), the book went through nine editions in his lifetime. It is one of the earliest-known examples of published writing by an African writer to be widely read in England. By 1792, it was a best seller and had been published in Russia, Germany, Holland and the United States. An "assertion of the universality of mankind and an invitation . . . . to extend the principle of the Enlightenment", it sought to expose as both "impious and absurd" the defence offered by enslavers and their apologists. Equiano wrote:

When you make men slaves, you deprive them of half their virtue, your set them in your own conduct an example of fraud, rapine and cruelty, and compel them to live with you in a state of war, and yet you complain they are not honest and faithful. You stupefy them with stripes and think it necessary to keep them in a state of ignorance, and yet you assert that they are incapable of learning . . . [and] that culture would be lost on them.

The argument may not, itself, have been unfamiliar to his readers. In his 1774 Thoughts Upon Slavery, John Wesley had insisted that the purported “stupidity [of Black people] in our plantations is not natural; otherwise than it is the natural effect of their Condition”. Their enslavers gave them "no opportunity", and "no motive, either from hope or fear", to "improve their understanding". Those Africans who had the same motives and opportunities as Europeans, were in no way inferior.

Equiano's memoir, the quality of whose imagery, description and literary style was widely commented upon, was the seeming proof of this proposition for his experience of enslavement had not been typical. Equiano had not been confined to field work, he had served his owners personally, had gone to sea, been taught to read and write, and, having been allowed to trade on his own account, was able to purchase his freedom.

The memoir begins with an account of his African childhood and of the laws and customs of his people. After being captured as a boy, he described communities he passed through as a captive on his way to the coast. His biography details his voyage on a slave ship and the brutality of slavery in the colonies of the West Indies, Virginia and Georgia. Equiano commented on the reduced rights that freed people of colour had in these same places, and they also faced risks of kidnapping and enslavement.

Several events in Equiano's life led him to question his Christian faith, adopted at age 14. He was distressed in 1774 by the kidnapping of his friend, a black cook named John Annis. Annis and his former enslaver, William Kirkpatrick, had initially "parted by consent" but Kirkpatrick reneged, seeking to kidnap and re-enslave Annis. Kirkpatrick was ultimately successful, forcibly removing Annis from the British ship Anglicania where both he and Equiano served. This was in violation of the decision in the Somersett Case (1772), that slaves could not be taken from England without their permission, as common law did not support the institution in England and Wales. Kirkpatrick had Annis transported to Saint Kitts, where he was punished severely and worked as a plantation labourer until he died. With the aid of Granville Sharp, Equiano tried to get Annis released before he was shipped from England but was unsuccessful. He heard that Annis was not free from suffering until he died in slavery. Despite his questioning, he affirms his faith in Christianity, as seen in the penultimate sentence of his work that quotes the prophet Micah (Micah 6:8): "After all, what makes any event important, unless by its observation we become better and wiser, and learn 'to do justly, to love mercy, and to walk humbly before God?'"

In his account, Equiano also told of settling in London. He married an English woman and lived with her in Soham, Cambridgeshire, where they had two daughters. He became a leading abolitionist in the 1780s, lecturing in numerous cities against the slave trade. Equiano records his and Granville Sharp's central roles in the anti-slave trade movement, and their effort to publicise the Zong massacre, which became known in 1783.

== Later years, radical connections ==
In 1783, following the American War of Independence, Equiano became involved in a resettlement scheme for the black, largely destitute, community in London numbering some 20,000. Some were freed slaves from the Caribbean, others had been brought from the Americas by their owners to England and freed following the establishment of the principle that slavery had no basis in British common law. They also included some 3,000 Black loyalists who in the American colonies had traded service to the Crown for the promise of freedom.

Equiano was appointed "Commissary of Provisions and Stores for the Black Poor going to Sierra Leone" in November 1786. This was a scheme to resettle London's black poor in Freetown, on the west African coast, under the administration of John Clarkson, younger brother of abolitionist Thomas Clarkson. . The settlers from London were joined by more than 1,200 Black Loyalists from Nova Scotia where they had had an unwelcome reception after being evacuated from New York City. But Equiano's tenure was brief. Protesting financial mismanagement, he fell out with Clarkson and returned to London.

In London, Equiano was one of the leading members of the Sons of Africa, a small abolitionist group composed of free Africans. They were closely allied with the Society for the Abolition of the Slave Trade. Equiano's comments on issues were published in newspapers such as the Public Advertiser and the Morning Chronicle. He replied to James Tobin in 1788, in the Public Advertiser, attacking two of his pamphlets and a related book from 1786 by Gordon Turnbull. Equiano had more of a public voice than most Africans or Black Loyalists and he seized various opportunities to use it.

Equiano was an active member of the radical working-class London Corresponding Society (LCS), which campaigned for democratic reform. In 1791–92, touring the British Isles with his autobiography and drawing on abolitionist networks he brokered connections for the LCS, including what may have been the Society's first contacts with the United Irishmen.

In Belfast, where his appearance in October 1791 was celebrated by abolitionists who five years previously had defeated plans to commission vessels in the port for the Middle Passage, Equiano was hosted by a leading figure in the new-formed Society of United Irishmen, publisher of their Painite newspaper the Northern Star, Samuel Neilson. As articulated by Theobald Wolfe Tone, the United Irishmen employed the same argument for the emancipation of their Catholic fellow countrymen, as Equiano had for the abolition of slavery. As a matter of justice, men cannot be denied rights because of any incapacity, whether of ignorance or of intemperance, for which the laws under which they are made to live are themselves responsible.

Following the onset of war with revolutionary France, leading members of the LCS, including Thomas Hardy with whom Equiano lodged in 1792, were charged with treason, and in 1799, following evidence of communication between leading members and the insurrectionary United Irishmen, the society was suppressed.

== Marriage and family ==
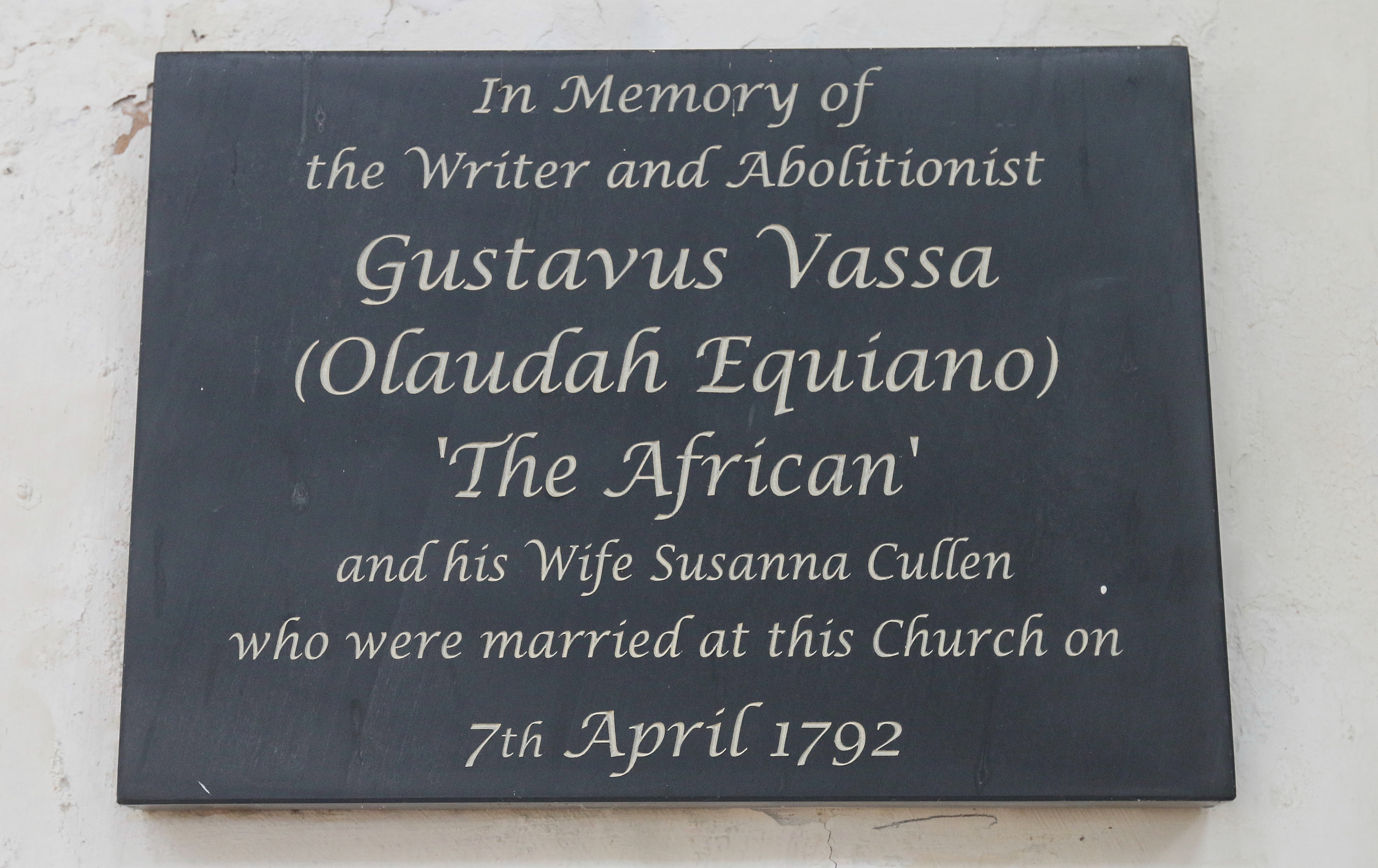
Commemorative plaque of the marriage of Gustavus Vassa and Susannah Cullen in St Andrew's Church, Soham

On 7 April 1792, Equiano married Susannah Cullen, a local woman, in St Andrew's Church, Soham, Cambridgeshire. The original marriage register containing the entry for Vassa and Cullen is held today by the Cambridgeshire Archives and Local Studies. He included his marriage in every edition of his autobiography from 1792 onwards. The couple settled in the area and had two daughters, Anna Maria (1793–1797) and Joanna (1795–1857), who were baptised at Soham church.

Susannah died in February 1796, aged 34, and Equiano died a year later, on 31 March 1797. Soon afterwards, Anna died at the age of three on 21 July 1797. Anna Maria is commemorated by a plaque on St Andrew's Church, Chesterton, Cambridge and is buried in the churchyard. The location of her grave was lost until student Cathy O’Neill identified it during her A-level studies in 1977. This was confirmed in 2021 when her work was found by Professor Victoria Avery of the Fitzwilliam Museum.

The orphaned Joanna inherited Equiano's estate when she was 21 years old; it was then valued at £950 (equivalent to £80,000 in 2025). Joanna Vassa married the Reverend Henry Bromley, a Congregationalist minister, in 1821. They are both buried at the non-denominational Abney Park Cemetery in Stoke Newington, London; the Bromleys' monument is now Grade II listed.

== Last days and will ==
Equiano drew up his will on 28 May 1796. At the time he was living at the Plaisterers' Hall, then on Addle Street, in Aldermanbury in the City of London. He moved to John Street (now Whitfield Street), close to Whitefield's Tabernacle, Tottenham Court Road. At his death on 31 March 1797, he was living in Paddington Street, Westminster. Equiano's death was reported in American as well as British newspapers.

Equiano was buried at Whitefield's Tabernacle on 6 April. The entry in the register reads "Gustus Vasa, 52 years, S^{t} Mary Le bone". His burial place has been lost. The small burial ground lay on either side of the chapel and is now Whitfield Gardens. The site of the chapel is now the American International Church.

Equiano's will, in the event of his daughters' deaths before reaching the age of 21, bequeathed half his wealth to the Sierra Leone Company for a school in Sierra Leone, and half to the London Missionary Society.

== Legacy ==
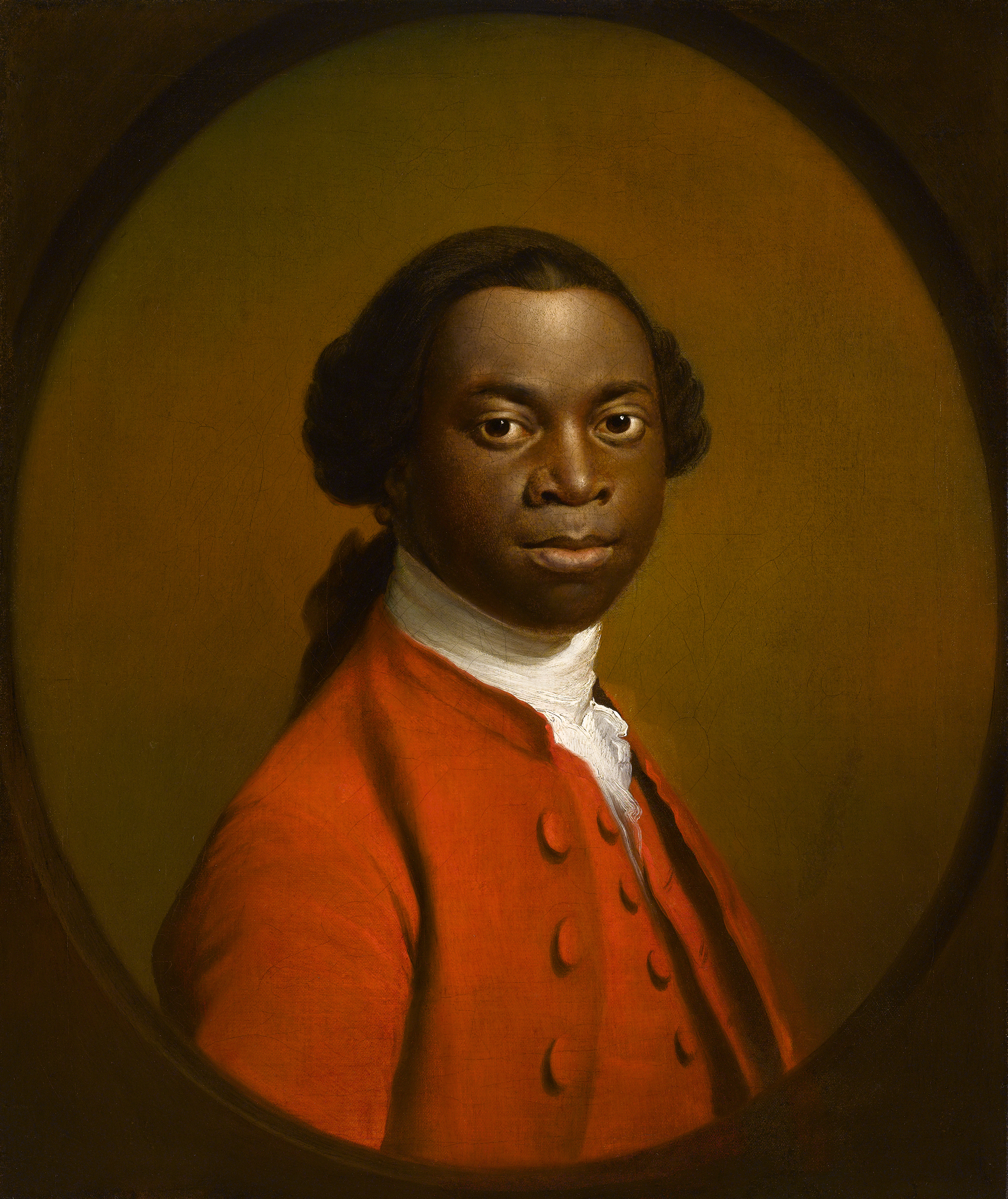
A portrait of an unknown man previously identified as Ignatius Sancho, or as Equiano, in the Royal Albert Memorial Museum, Exeter

Following publication in 1967 of a newly edited version of his memoir by Paul Edwards, interest in Equiano revived. Historian Paul Lovejoy notes that scholars value it as the most extensive account of an 18th-century slave's life and the difficult passage from slavery to freedom".

Scholars from Nigeria have also begun studying him. For example, O. S. Ogede identifies Equiano as a pioneer in asserting "the dignity of African life in the white society of his time". In questioning Equiano's African birth, Carretta had to defend himself against the charge of the Nigerian writer Obiwu (a survivor of the Igbo genocide) of "pseudo-detective work" and of indulging "in vast publicity gamesmanship".

=== Commemoration ===
- The Equiano Society was formed in London in November 1996. Its main objective is to publicise and celebrate the life and work of Olaudah Equiano.
- In 1789 Equiano moved to 10 Union Street (now 73 Riding House Street). A City of Westminster commemorative green plaque was unveiled there on 11 October 2000 as part of Black History Month. Student musicians from Trinity College of Music played a fanfare composed by Professor Ian Hall for the unveiling.
- Equiano is honoured in the Church of England and remembered in its Calendar of saints with a Lesser Festival on 30 July, along with Thomas Clarkson and William Wilberforce who worked for abolition of the slave trade and slavery.
- In 2007, the year of the celebration in Britain of the bicentenary of the abolition of the slave trade, Equiano's life and achievements were included in the National Curriculum, together with William Wilberforce. In December 2012 The Daily Mail claimed that both would be dropped from the curriculum, a claim which itself became subject to controversy. In January 2013 Operation Black Vote launched a petition to request Education Secretary Michael Gove to keep both Equiano and Mary Seacole in the National Curriculum. American Rev. Jesse Jackson and others wrote a letter to The Times protesting against the mooted removal of both figures from the National Curriculum.
- A statue of Equiano, made by pupils of Edmund Waller School, was erected in Telegraph Hill Lower Park, New Cross, London, in 2008.
- The head of Equiano is included in Martin Bond's 1997 sculpture Wall of the Ancestors in Deptford, London
- Author Ann Cameron adapted Equiano's autobiography for children, leaving most of the text in Equiano's own words; the book was published in 1995 in the US by Random House as The Kidnapped Prince: The Life of Olaudah Equiano, with an introduction by historian Henry Louis Gates Jr.
- On 16 October 2017, Google Doodle honoured Equiano by celebrating the 272nd year since his birth.
- A crater on Mercury was named "Equiano" in 1976.
- The exoplanet HD 43197 b was officially named Equiano in 2019 as part of NameExoWorlds.
- In 2019, Google Cloud named a subsea cable running from Portugal through the West Coast of Africa and terminating in South Africa after Equiano.
- The Nubian Jak Community Trust erected a plaque on 17 December 2021 at 111 Maze Hill, Greenwich, to commemorate Equiano's residence with the Guerin Sisters, Elizabeth and Mary, following the purchase of his freedom in 1767.
- In 2022, the city of Cambridge honoured Equiano by renaming Riverside Bridge to Equiano Bridge.
- In 2025, Equiano featured in "Rise Up: Resistance, Revolution, Abolition" at the Fitzwilliam Museum of Cambridge University an exhibition focused on individuals whose contributions were vital to British abolition such as often-forgotten Black Georgians.
- In 2025, Equiano was one of five individuals celebrated in LGBTQ+ history month.

=== Cultural representation ===
- The Gambian actor Louis Mahoney played Equiano in the BBC television mini-series The Fight Against Slavery (1975).
- A 28-minute documentary, Son of Africa: The Slave Narrative of Olaudah Equiano (1996), produced by the BBC and directed by Alrick Riley, uses dramatic reconstruction, archival material and interviews to provide the social and economic context for his life and the slave trade.

Numerous works about Equiano have been produced for and since the 2007 bicentenary of Britain's abolition of the slave trade:

- Equiano was portrayed by the Senegalese musician Youssou N'Dour in the film Amazing Grace (2006).
- African Snow (2007), a play by Murray Watts, takes place in the mind of John Newton, a captain in the slave trade who later became an Anglican cleric and hymnwriter. It was first produced at the York Theatre Royal as a co-production with Riding Lights Theatre Company, transferring to the Trafalgar Studios in London's West End and a national tour. Newton was played by Roger Alborough and Equiano by Israel Oyelumade.
- Kent historian Dr Robert Hume wrote a children's book entitled Equiano: The Slave with the Loud Voice (2007), illustrated by Cheryl Ives.
- David and Jessica Oyelowo appeared as Olaudah and his wife in Grace Unshackled – The Olaudah Equiano Story (2007), a radio adaptation of Equiano's autobiography, created by Focus on the Family Radio Theatre.
- The British jazz artist Soweto Kinch's first album, Conversations with the Unseen (2003), contains a track entitled "Equiano's Tears".
- Equiano was portrayed by Jeffery Kissoon in Margaret Busby's 2007 play An African Cargo, staged at London's Greenwich Theatre.
- Equiano is portrayed by Danny Sapani in the BBC series Garrow's Law (2010).
- The Nigerian writer Chika Unigwe has written a fictional memoir of Equiano: The Black Messiah, originally published in Dutch as De zwarte messias (2013).
- In Jason Young's 2007 short animated film, The Interesting Narrative of Olaudah Equiano, Chris Rochester portrayed Equiano.
- A TikTok series under the account @equiano.stories recounts "the true story of Olaudah Equiano", a collection of episodes reimagining the childhood of Equiano. The story is captured as a self-recorded, first-person account, within the format of Instagram Stories/TikTok posts, using video, still images, and text.
- In 2022, a documentary entitled The Amazing Life of Olaudah Equiano was broadcast by BBC Radio 4, produced by Marc Wadsworth and Deborah Hobson.
- Katie Sweeting, author and English professor at Hudson County Community College, wrote Remnant, a historical novel about Equiano’s daughter Joanna Vassa Bromley and his sister, name unknown.

== See also ==
- Ottobah Cugoano, an African abolitionist active in Britain in the late 18th century
- Phillis Wheatley, recognised in the 18th century as the first African-American author of a published book of poetry
- List of civil rights leaders
- List of slaves
