= The New Emancipation =

Studio album by Soweto Kinch
- Released: 2010
- Recorded: Recorded at Sphere Studios and Femitone Studios, London
- Genre: Jazz, hip-hop
- Length: 74:35
- Label: Soweto Kinch Recordings
- Producer: Soweto Kinch and Tony Platt

Soweto Kinch chronology
A Life in the Day of B19: Tales of the Tower Block (2006)	The New Emancipation (2010)	The Legend Of Mike Smith (2013)

The New Emancipation is a 2010 album by Soweto Kinch.

== Track listing ==
All tracks are written by Soweto Kinch.

1. "An Ancient Worksong" (1:42)
2. "Trying to be a Star" (4:28)
3. "A People With No Past" (6:45)
4. "Paris Heights" (7:56)
5. "Suspended Adolescence" (7:37)
6. "Help" (7:12)
7. "Love of Money" (4:30)
8. "Trade" (8:19)
9. "Axis of Evil" (3:42)
10. "On the Treadmill" (4:52)
11. "Escape" (2:35)
12. "Never Ending" (10:27)
13. "Raise Your Spirit" (4:30)

== Personnel ==
- Soweto Kinch – alto saxophone, vocals, rap vocals, programming, tenor saxophone
- Byron Wallen – trumpet
- Shabaka Hutchings – clarinet on "An Ancient Worksong", bass clarinet on "Trade", and tenor saxophone on "On the Treadmill"
- Harry Brown – trombone
- Femi Temowo – guitar
- Karl Rasheed-Abel – double bass
- Justin Brown – drums
- Francis Mott – vocals on "Trying to be a Star"
- Jason MacDougall – vocals on "Help"
- Eska Mtungwazi – vocals on "Escape"

Additional vocals on "Paris Heights" provided by:

- Toyin Kinch
- Alexandra Allen
- Lee Parsons
- Natasha Brown
- Undi "Metamore" Chidzanja
- Femi Temowo
