= A Life in the Day of B19: Tales of the Tower Block =

2006 studio album by Soweto Kinch

Studio album by Soweto Kinch
- Released: 2006
- Recorded: Recorded at Mark Angelo Studios, Kore Studios, and The Shop, London
- Genre: Jazz, hip-hop
- Length: 78:46
- Label: Dune Records
- Producer: Tony Platt

Soweto Kinch chronology
Conversations with the Unseen (2003)	A Life in the Day of B19: Tales of the Tower Block (2006)	The New Emancipation (2010)

Professional ratings
Review scores
Source	Rating
The Penguin Guide to Jazz Recordings	2.5/4 stars

A Life in the Day of B19: Tales of the Tower Block is a 2006 album by British saxophonist and rapper Soweto Kinch.

== Track listing ==
All tracks are written by Soweto Kinch.

1. "The Opening Theme" (1:17)
2. "The Mission / Skit 1 – The Tower Block" (6:47)
3. "10.30 Appointment / Skit 2 – In the Rain" (6:45)
4. "Adrian's Ballad / Skit 3 – Under the Bus Shelter" (4:49)
5. "Love Gamble / Skit 4 – Back in the Council High Rise" (4:25)
6. "Ridez / Skit 5 – Marcus' Flat" (5:09)
7. "Padz / Skit 6 – Marcus' Crisis" (5:33)
8. "Marcus' Crisis / Skit 7 – Well MC" (4:51)
9. "So! / Skit 8 – Adrian's Dreams" (7:20)
10. "Expansion / Skit 9 – Parting in the Clouds" (3:19)
11. "Out There / Skit 10 – The Court" (4:53)
12. "A Friendly Game of Basketball / Skit 11 – The Platform / Skit 12 – The Train That Never Came" (6:50)
13. "Everybody Raps – Skit 13 – Why Don't We All Team Up" (5:42)
14. "Who Knows? / Skit 14 – Adrian's New Property" (4:56)
15. "The House That Love Built / Skit 15 – Into the Basement" (6:10)

== Personnel ==
- Soweto Kinch – alto saxophone, rap vocals, tenor saxophone
- Abram Wilson – trumpet
- Denys Baptiste – tenor saxophone
- Harry Brown – trombone
- Femi Temowo – guitar
- Michael Olatuja – bass
- Troy Miller – drums
- Moira Stuart – narration (track 1, skit 4, skit 5, skits 7–9, skit 12, skits 14 and 15)

Additional vocals provided by

- Perge
- Toyin Kinch
- Kim Trusty
- Jonathan Kidd
- Breis
- Francis Mott
- Jonzi D
- Dannie Hoch
