= Joanna Vassa =

English congregationalist (1795–1857)

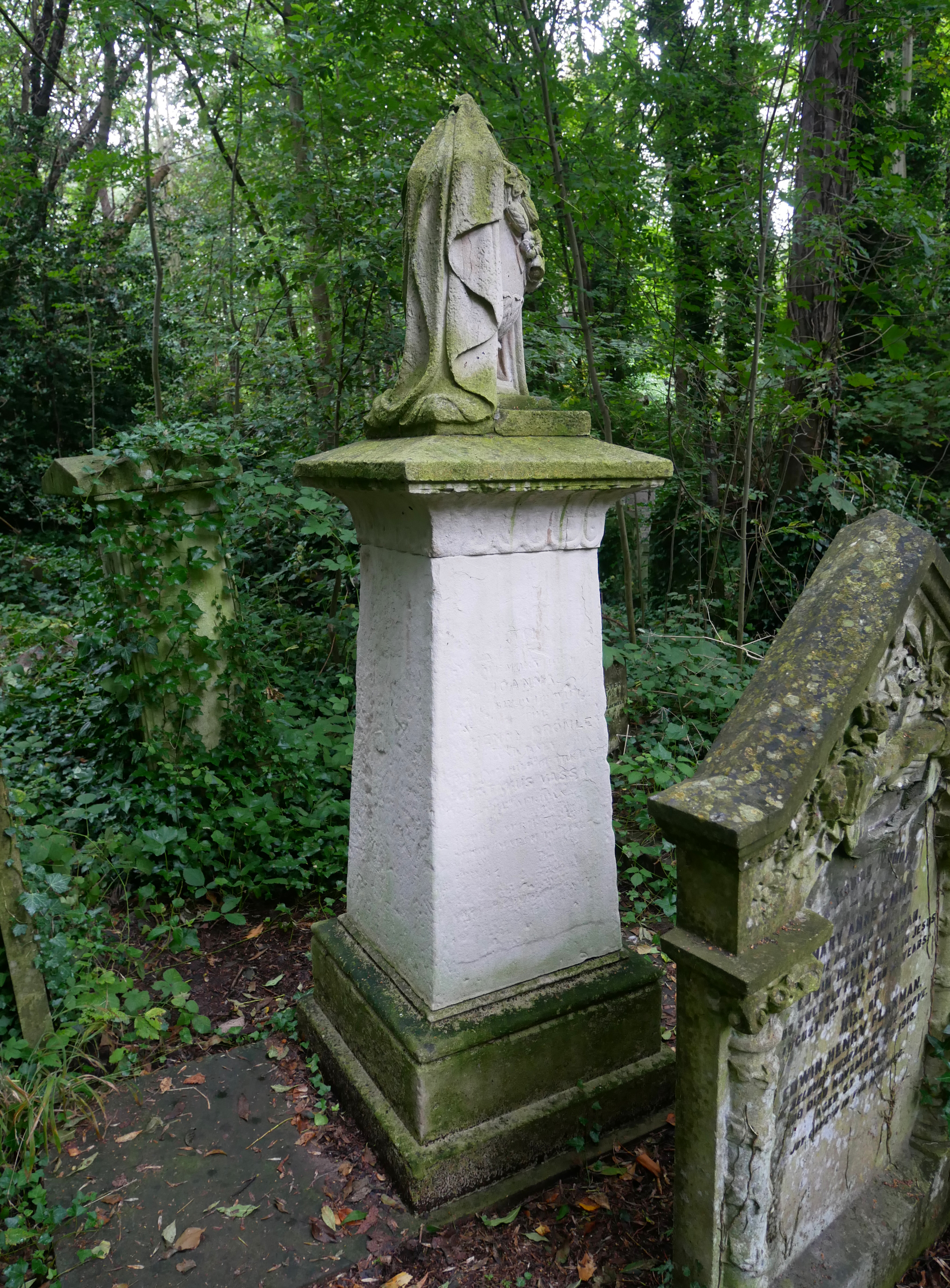
Joanna Vassa's memorial in Abney Park Cemetery, re-erected in 2006

Joanna Vassa (/ˈvæsə/; 11 April 1795 – 10 March 1857) was the only surviving adult child of the former slave and anti-slavery campaigner Olaudah Equiano. Her grave in Abney Park Cemetery, London, was given listed status in 2008 but little is known of her life.

== Early life and family ==
She was born to Susannah Cullen of Fordham, Cambridgeshire, and Olaudah Equiano (also known as "Gustavus Vassa, the African") on 11 April 1795, and baptised in St Andrew's Church, Soham, Cambridgeshire, on 29 April. Her father was well known for his 1789 autobiography, The Interesting Narrative of the Life of Olaudah Equiano. Her mother was a subscriber to Equiano's Narrative and they were married on 7 April 1792 in Soham parish church.

The year after Joanna's birth, Susannah died of an illness, on 21 February 1796, and was buried at St Andrew's Church, Soham. Joanna's father died just over a year later. Shortly afterwards followed the death of her elder sister and only sibling Anna Maria (born 30 January 1793), on 21 July 1797. Anna Maria is commemorated by a poetic plaque outside St Andrew’s Church, Chesterton, Cambridge and her grave marked with a footstone engraved AMV 1797 was rediscovered nearby in the churchyard in 2025.

== Adulthood and marriage ==
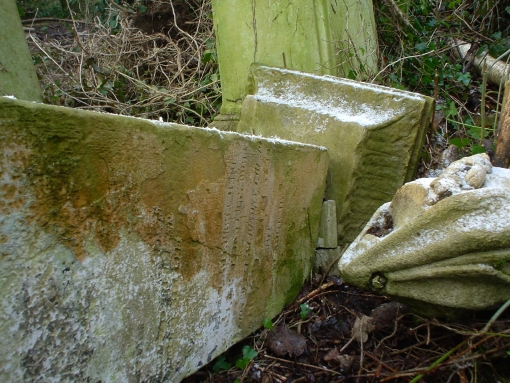
Joanna Vassa's memorial at Abney Park Cemetery shortly after its discovery in 2005, awaiting restoration

In 1816, on reaching her 21st birthday, Joanna Vassa, being Equiano's only known surviving relative, inherited a silver watch and £950 (equivalent to £80,100 in 2025) from his estate. It is not known who brought her up but it is speculated it may have been John Audley who was an executor of Equiano's will and later a witness at her wedding.

It is not clear how Joanna met her future husband, the Congregational minister, Rev. Henry Bromley, but on 29 August 1821, they were married at St James's Church, Clerkenwell, a Church of England parish church in London. He had been ordained a minister at the Independent Chapel in Appledore in Devon, two months prior to the wedding. He was 24 years old and Joanna was 26. They settled in Devon for at least five years until they moved to the Congregational Church (present day United Reformed Church) at Clavering, Essex, where Rev. Bromley was pastor between 1827 and 1845. He was a member of Clavering Reading Society throughout his time there.

== Later life, death, and memorial ==
On 26 October 1845, Rev. Henry Bromley resigned from his congregation, citing his wife's health as the reason. She was 50 years old and he was 48. The couple moved to London that year for her health, her husband taking on only occasional commitments at Clavering thereafter. He became a minister at the Providence Chapel in Harwich during 1851, while Joanna lived with his family in Stowmarket, Suffolk. Eventually, she moved back to London and resided at 21 Benyan Terrace, Buckingham Road, in Hackney; but there is no record of Henry living with her.

She died of uterine disease, possibly brought on by fibroids, on 10 March 1857, aged 61. She was buried on 16 March in Abney Park Cemetery, close to the memorial statue to Isaac Watts on the axial walk from the chapel to Stoke Newington Church Street. Her husband, Henry, survived her for twenty years and was buried with her on 12 February 1878. It has not been discovered whether they had any children.

Her memorial at Abney Park was pinned and re-erected in 2006 in time for the 150th anniversary of her death in 2007. This coincided with the bicentenary of the Slave Trade Act, which abolished the slave trade in the British Empire, a goal towards which her father had worked. It has been a Grade II listed building since 2008.

== Sources ==
- Osborne, Angelina (2007). Equiano's Daughter: The Life and Times of Joanna Vassa. London: Momentum Arts. ISBN 978-0-9534328-1-3.
