= Alexander Campbell (planter) =

Scottish merchant and planter in the Caribbean (1739–1795)

- Born: 1739; Scotland
- Died: 8 April 1795 (aged 55–56); Belvedere Estate

Alexander Campbell (1739–1795) was a Scottish merchant and plantation owner in Grenada, and good friend of Ninian Nome, who he was executed with during Fédon's rebellion. He is also known for owning Ottobah Cugoano, a prominent abolutionist.

== Early life ==
Alexander Campbell was born in 1739 in Lossit, Argyllshire, Scotland to John Campbell and his second wife Jean Campbell. He was brother to James Campbell, another planter in Grenada and Tobago. During the early 1760s he lived in Virginia with his older half-brother Archibald Campbell, gaining experience on Tobacco plantations.

== Life in the Caribbean ==
View of Belmont Estate in 1821 (owned by Governor Alexander Houstoun at the time)

In 1763, he borrowed £40,000 to buy two plantations and 300 hundred slaves, he primarily engaged in the production of sugar before diversifying his business to include other crops. His business ventures extended to other Caribbean islands such as Tobago, Dominica and St Vincent and the Grenadines. In 1770, Campbell who owned Tivoli estate was leased the adjacent Belmont estate from Mr John Aitcherson Jr, the lease was to last for 13 years at a cost of £2520 per year. Alexander Campbell was a speaker in Grenada's colonial assembly along with other prominent colonists and businessmen. In 1772 he purchased Ottobah Cugoano, bringing him to London when he went to lobby for West Indies planters against the Crown's tax increases on sugar duty on ceded islands. He was a prominent anti-abolutionist, and by 1790 he had well over 1000 slaves.

== Death ==
On the 2 March 1795, Fédon's rebellion broke out in Grenada, the following morning the rebels captured Ninian Home and Campbell at Home's Paraclete estate, they were executed by gunshot on 8 April 1795. Campbell was around 56 years old at the time.
