= Ottobah Cugoano =

British abolitionist and activist (1757–1791)

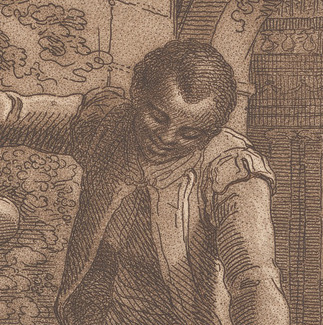
- Cugoano, 1784, by Richard Cosway
- Born: c. 1757; Ajumako, Gold Coast
- Died: c. 1791
- Other names: John Stuart; Quobna Ottobah Cugoano
- Occupations: Abolitionist and political activist
- Notable work: Thoughts and Sentiments on the Evil and Wicked Traffic of the Slavery and Commerce of the Human Species (1787)

Ottobah Cugoano (c. 1757 – c. 1791), also known as John Stuart, was a British abolitionist and activist who was born in the Gold Coast (modern-day Ghana). He was sold into slavery at the age of thirteen and shipped to Grenada in the West Indies. In 1772, he was purchased by a merchant who took him to England, where Cugoano learned to read and write, and was emancipated. Eventually, he started working for the artists Richard and Maria Cosway, becoming acquainted with several prominent British political and cultural figures as a result. He joined the Sons of Africa, a group of Black abolitionists in Britain, and died at some point after 1791.

== Early life ==
He was born Quobna Ottobah Cugoano (Note: "The British Library has a copy of the 1791 edition [of Cugoano's book] in which the author's name is printed at the end as 'Quobna Ottobah Cugoano'. Ray A Kea, A Cultural and Social History of Ghana from the Seventeenth to the Nineteenth Century, Lewiston, NY, 2012, notes that the modern version of 'Quobna' would be 'Kwabena', meaning 'born on Tuesday', and 'Ottobah' meant 'second-born', so he must have had a brother or sister.") in 1757 in Agimaque (Ajumako) in the Gold Coast (modern-day Ghana). He was born into a Fante family and his family was close to the local chief.

At the age of 13, Cugoano was kidnapped with a group of children, sold into slavery and transported from Cape Coast on a slave ship to Grenada. He worked on a plantation in the Lesser Antilles until he was purchased in 1772 by Alexander Campbell, a Scottish plantation owner, who took him into his household.

Late in 1772, Campbell took Cugoano with him on a visit to England, where Cugoano was able to secure his freedom. It is thought possible that encouragement for him to gain freedom may have come from the pivotal case Somerset v Stewart, involving James Somerset, who had escaped from enslavement. In June 1772, its ruling challenged the legal basis of slavery in England and Wales.

On 20 August 1773, Cugoano was baptised at St James's Church, Piccadilly, as "John Stuart – a Black, aged 16 Years".

== Abolitionist ==
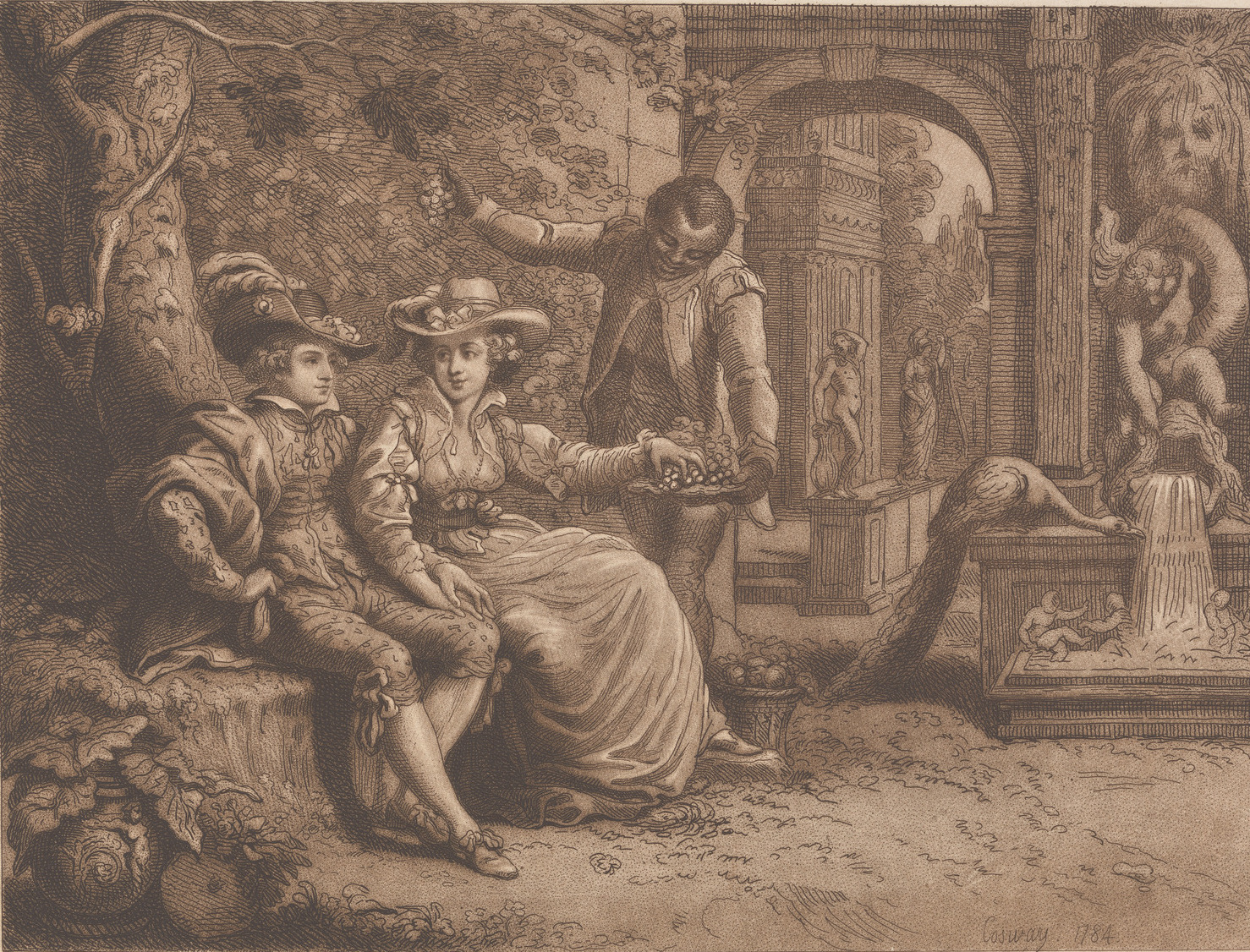
Richard and Maria Cosway, and Ottobah Cugoano (1784), by Richard Cosway

In 1784, Cugoano was employed as a servant by the artists Richard Cosway and his wife, Maria. Through the Cosways, he came to the attention of leading British political and cultural figures of the time, including the poet William Blake and the Prince of Wales. Together with Olaudah Equiano and other educated Africans living in Britain, Cugoano became active in the Sons of Africa, an abolitionist group whose members wrote frequently to the newspapers of the day, condemning the practice of enslavement.

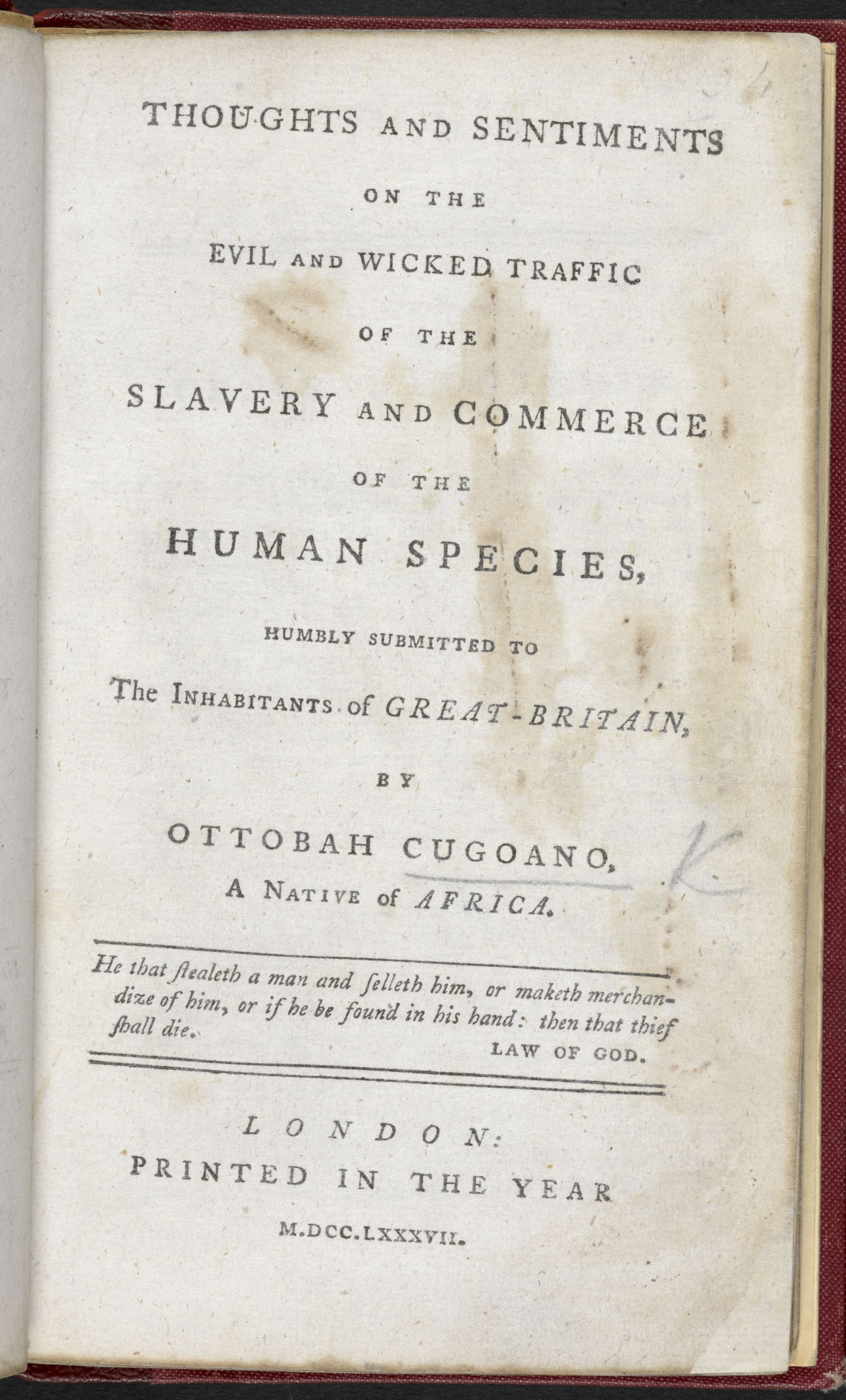
Title page of Thoughts and Sentiments on the Evil and Wicked Traffic of the Slavery and Commerce of the Human Species (1787)

In 1786, he played a key role in the case of Henry Demane, a kidnapped black man who was to be shipped back to the West Indies. Cugoano contacted Granville Sharp, a well-known abolitionist, who was able to have Demane removed from the ship before it sailed.

In 1787, possibly with the help of his friend Olaudah Equiano, Cugoano published an abolitionist work entitled Thoughts and Sentiments on the Evil and Wicked Traffic of the Slavery and Commerce of the Human Species (1787). By now a devout Christian, his work was informed by Cugoano's religious belief, and he used arguments around Christianity and global economics and politics for this cause. The work called for the abolition of slavery and immediate emancipation of all enslaved people. It argues that an enslaved person's duty is to escape from slavery, and that force should be used to prevent further enslavement. Cugoano devoted pages to his own first-hand experience, describing how he had been betrayed by African slave traders who had sold him and other children to European traders. He vividly recalled his exact worth, being equal to that of a gun, cloth and some lead. The work was immensely popular, being reprinted three times and translated into French.

The work was sent to prominent British political figures such as George III, the Prince of Wales and Edmund Burke. A shorter version of the work was published in 1791, with subscribers including prominent artists such as Cosway, Joshua Reynolds, James Northcote and Joseph Nollekens, "indicating their support of Cugoano's mission". In the shortened work, addressed to the "Sons of Africa", Cugoano expressed qualified support for the efforts to establish a colony in Sierra Leone for London's "Poor Blacks" (mostly freed African-American slaves who had been relocated to London after the American Revolutionary War. Other early settlers were the Nova Scotian Settlers, that is Black Loyalists, also former American slaves, from Nova Scotia, who chose to move to Sierra Leone). Cugoano called for the establishment of schools in Britain especially for African students.

In 1791, Cugoano moved with the Cosways to 12 Queen Street in Mayfair. His last known letter, written in 1791, mentions travelling to "upwards of fifty places" to promote the book and that he found that "complexion is a predominant prejudice". Cugoano wished to travel to Nova Scotia to recruit settlers for the proposed free colony of African Britons in Sierra Leone but it is not known if he did so. After 1791, Cugoano disappears from the historical record, and it is likely that he died in 1791 or 1792.

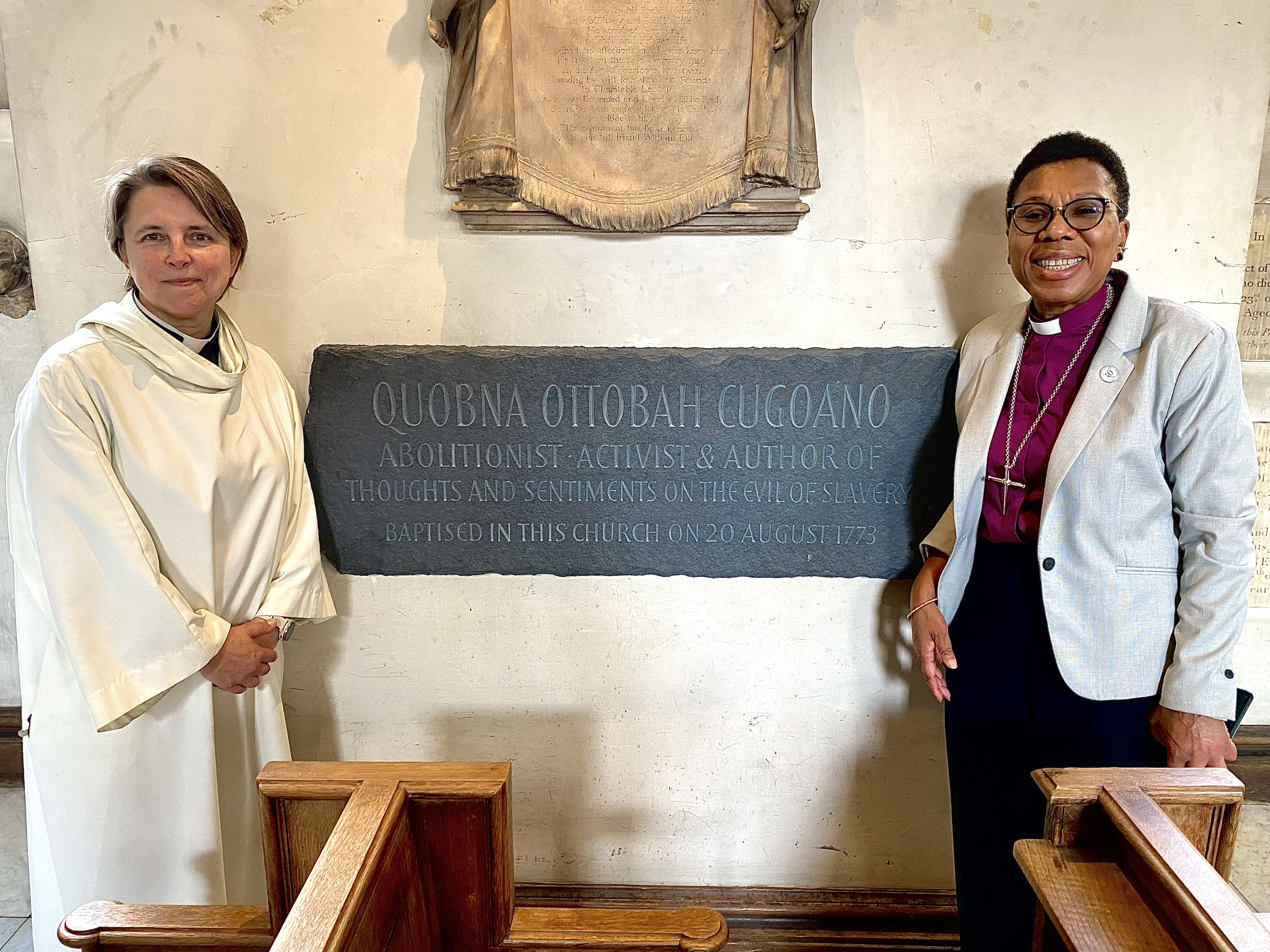
Revd Lucy Winkett and Revd Dr Rosemarie Mallett at the dedication of the plaque commemorating 250th anniversary of Cugoano's baptism, 20 August 2023

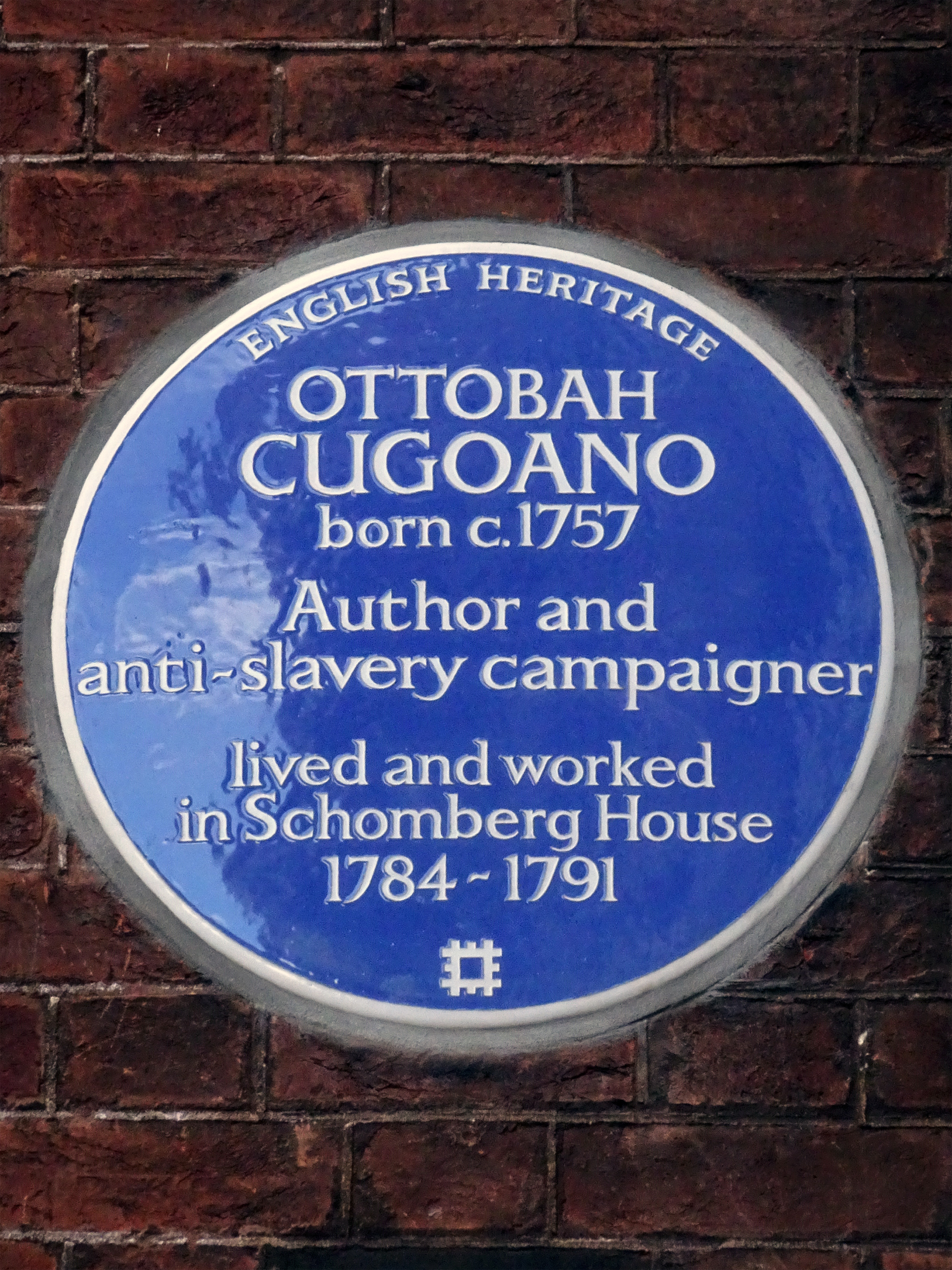
Blue plaque on Schomberg House

== Commemoration ==
=== Schomberg House, Pall Mall ===
In November 2020, an English Heritage blue plaque honouring Cugoano was unveiled on Schomberg House in Pall Mall, London, where he had lived and worked with the Cosways from 1784 to 1791.

=== St James's Church, Piccadilly ===
On 20 August 2023, St James's Church, Piccadilly, dedicated a new plaque to honour the 250th anniversary of Cugoano's baptism there in 1773, the only recorded date in his life. St James's additionally commissioned Trinidad-based artist Che Lovelace to create a new artwork in commemoration of Cugoano's baptismal anniversary, which was installed in the church entrance on 20 September 2023 – the first permanent artwork commissioned by St James's Church, as well as the first anywhere in the world to commemorate Cugoano.

== See also ==
- Black British elite
- Olaudah Equiano
- List of civil rights leaders
- List of slaves
