= Don Kinch =

Barbadian playwright and arts executive

- Born: Barbados
- Died: 31 October 2024
- Education: Goldsmiths, University of London
- Occupations: Playwright, educator and arts executive
- Spouse: Yvette Harris
- Children: 3 sons, inc Soweto Kinch

Don Kinch (died 31 October 2024) was a Barbados-born playwright, educator and arts executive who, in 1965, migrated to England, where he made notable contributions to Black British theatre and culture, as a playwright, director and founder of theatre companies and community arts groups. Jazz saxophonist Soweto Kinch is his son.

== Background ==
Born in Barbados, Kinch migrated to the United Kingdom in 1965. He studied at Goldsmiths College, University of London, where he gained a BA degree in Drama and Sociology and an MA in anthropology.

In 1975, Kinch founded the performing company Staunch Poets and Players, as well as launching and edited Staunch Magazine. In the late 1980s, he moved to Birmingham, where he developed the Third Dimension Theatre Company and the African Peoples Theatre, and in 2000 founded Nu Century Arts as a resource for new writers, musicians, directors and actors, and to "encourage young people from black communities in Birmingham to get involved in theatre, music and literature".

His plays have been performed internationally, including in the United States, the Caribbean, Africa and Europe, produced by major companies and theatres, among them the Birmingham Repertory Theatre, the West Yorkshire Playhouse, South African State Theatre, Market Theatre, at such notable festivals as Grahamstown and the Edinburgh International Festival, as well as having been broadcast on national television and radio in the UK.

Kinch's career as a teacher spanned working at a range of levels, from secondary schools to further education (City College, Birmingham) to Birmingham University.

Playwright Roy Williams as a teenager was mentored by Kinch, who introduced him to theatre. Speaking at the 2024 Alfred Fagon Award ceremony, Williams described Kinch as "a writer and director who taught me more than anyone what it means to be Black and British and whose work made me fall in love with theatre."

The landmark 2012 documentary film, Margins to Mainstream: The Story of Black Theatre in Britain, was produced by Nu Century Arts, Birmingham, under Kinch's directorship, in partnership with the Octavia Foundation with funding from the Heritage Lottery Fund. Speaking of its significance, Kinch said: "The 1978 publication of 'The Arts Britain Ignores' by Naseem Khan lifted the lid to reveal a hive of theatrical activity taking place across Black Communities. The 1990 production of Amani Napthali's 'Ragamuffin' was another seminal moment when a confident black theatre found the courage to tell its story in its own way. I hope that the making and sharing of Margins to Mainstream will be another such moment."

== Personal life ==
Kinch was married to British-Jamaican actress Yvette Harris, with whom he had three sons, the eldest being jazz saxophonist Soweto Kinch.

== Selected plays ==
Kinch's plays include:

- Gather in Your Name, 1979
- In Transit, 1981 (BBC)
- Compound Images, 1984
- Changing The Silence, 1985 (Channel 4)
- Coming Up For Air, 1990
- Duck Bath
- The BalmYard, 1990 (BBC)
- It's Just A Name, 2002, Birmingham
- Mother of Rain: Mmapula, 2005
- Not Quite Gospel, 2009, Rich Mix, London
- In Search Of My Father, 2012, Birmingham
