= Sons of Africa =

18th-century political organisation in Britain

- Founder: Ottobah Cugoano; Olaudah Equiano; Other former black slaves
- Founded: 1787; 239 years ago
- Ideology: Slavery abolition Black people rights Racial equality

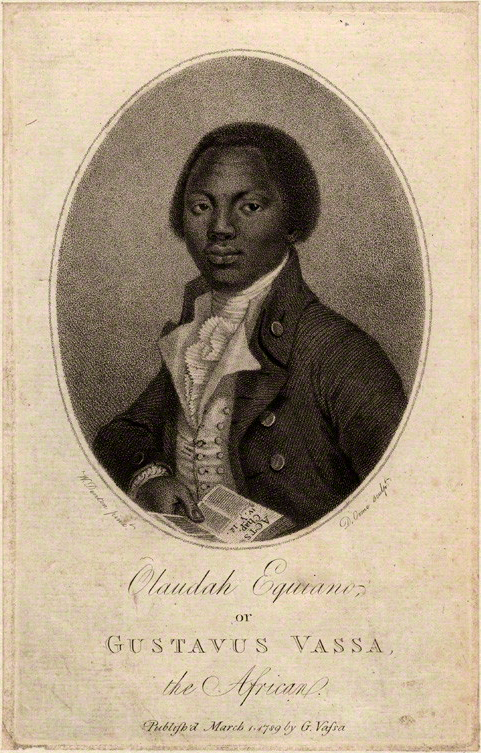
Olaudah Equiano, a prominent member of the Sons of Africa.

The Sons of Africa were a late-18th-century group in Britain that campaigned to end African chattel slavery. The "corresponding society" has been called Britain's first black political organisation. Its members were educated Africans in London, including formerly enslaved men such as Ottobah Cugoano, Olaudah Equiano and other leading members of London's black community.

It was closely connected to the Society for Effecting the Abolition of the Slave Trade, a non-denominational group founded in 1787 by Granville Sharp and Thomas Clarkson.

== History ==
In Britain in the late 18th century, groups organised to end the slave trade and ultimately abolish slavery. The Quakers had been active. A new group was the Sons of Africa, made up of Africans who had been freed from slavery and were living in London, such as Ottobah Cugoano and Olaudah Equiano. During this period in Britain, a significant number of Africans were gathered in London, with the black community estimated to number around 10,000, most of whom had a slave background. In many instances, individuals had accompanied their masters as personal servants. Many had been educated and used their literacy to petition parliament on these issues, as well as writing to newspapers and speaking at lectures. They were allied with the newly founded Society for Effecting the Abolition of the Slave Trade of 1787, including both Quakers and Anglicans, including Thomas Clarkson. The Sons of Africa referred to him as "our constant and generous friend".

Equiano had learned about the 1783 insurance claim trial related to the Zong massacre and contacted abolitionist Granville Sharp, who helped bring the case to public attention. The group held public meetings to lecture about slavery. The Sons of Africa actively engaged with Members of Parliament, many of whom had personal links to the slave trade. They wrote letters, for example to the MP Sir William Dolben. They often sent letters opposing slavery and detailing conditions of the Middle Passage to newspapers, to help provoke debate. Shortly after his correspondence with them and a visit to see a slave ship being fitted out, Dolben proposed a Parliamentary bill to improve the conditions on slave ships. The Slave Act 1788 was the first law passed to regulate the slave trade, establishing standards of how many slaves could be carried in relation to ship size.

Equiano also led delegations of the Sons to Parliament to persuade MPs to abolish the transatlantic slave trade. This was achieved under the Slave Trade Act 1807, which applied to all colonies except those in India, where the colonial government believed that slavery was part of Indian culture. The legislation included provisions for Britain to use naval force to enforce the law, and it began to intercept illegal slave ships off the coast of Africa through the Blockade of Africa and the African Slave Trade Patrol. The Sons of Africa continued to work for abolition of slavery in the British colonies.

== Membership ==
The membership of the Sons of Africa varied, it included:

- Olaudah Equiano
- Ottobah Cugoano (who often signed as John Stuart)
- George Mandeville
- William Stevens
- Joseph Almze
- Boughwa Gegansmel
- Jasper Goree
- James Bailey
- Thomas Oxford
- George Wallace
- John Christopher
- Thomas Jones
- Thomas Carlisle
- Daniel Christopher
