= London Radium Institute =

English-based health initiative

Coordinates: 51.5183°N 0.1426°W

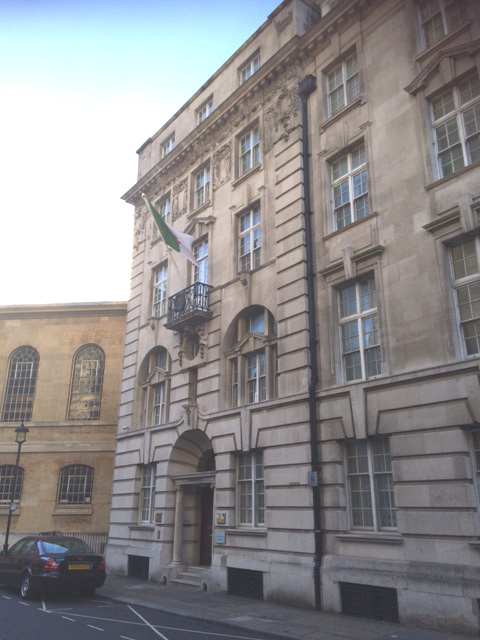
London Radium Institute premises, 1 & 3 Riding House Street, currently the Algerian Embassy

The London Radium Institute was a public health initiative set in motion by Edward VII in 1909 and initially financed by Ernest Cassel and Edward Guinness. The architect T. Phillips Figgis was commissioned to build premises at 1 & 3 Riding House Street, the first part of which was ready in 1911, with the second being completed in 1914. The premises are now a Grade II listed building.

The institute applied the medical uses of radium, which originally were only external, with subsequent internal uses being developed. In its first year of operation, it was claimed that, of thirty-nine cases of cancer of the uterus treated, three patients were discharged as cured, and another nineteen were regarded as "improved".

== Chairmen ==
- 1909–1923 Sir Frederick Treves
- 1923–1925 Malcolm Morris
- 1925–1929 Anthony Bowlby
