= The Legend of Mike Smith =

Studio album by Soweto Kinch
- Released: 2013
- Recorded: 11–12 April 2012 at Snap Studios, London
- Genre: Jazz, hip hop
- Length: 146 minutes
- Label: Soweto Kinch Recordings
- Producer: Soweto Kinch

Soweto Kinch chronology
The New Emancipation (2010)	The Legend of Mike Smith (2013)

The Legend of Mike Smith is a 2013 album by Soweto Kinch.

== Track listing ==
All tracks are written by Soweto Kinch. CD2 starts from track 22.

No.	Title	Length
1.	"The Phone Call"	2:22
2.	"A Restless Mind"	3:32
3.	"The Great Commission"	0:16
4.	"The Dream"	7:11
5.	"Proactive Training"	1:52
6.	"Acedia"	6:48
7.	"Buzzy's Coattails"	2:03
8.	"Invidia"	4:40
9.	"Pick Up the Phone"	0:37
10.	"Road Block"	6:45
11.	"Tube Delays"	0:16
12.	"Traffic Lights"	4:27
13.	"Pressure"	6:06
14.	"Serpent's Tail"	0:47
15.	"Ira"	5:03
16.	"Concierge"	1:16
17.	"Vacuum"	8:33
18.	"Shopping Spree"	0:30
19.	"Sweeping Change"	7:52
20.	"Lord of the Flies"	0:37
21.	"Gula"	6:34
22.	"Escape the Vomitorium"	1:23
23.	"Luxuria"	6:04
24.	"Not Smooth Sir"	0:39
25.	"The Board Game"	4:52
26.	"Play Again"	0:39
27.	"Avaritia"	6:41
28.	"Roma"	0:46
29.	"Slam"	2:15
30.	"Shut Out the Voices"	0:55
31.	"Better Off Alone"	5:37
32.	"Razor Calls"	1:15
33.	"Superbia"	6:49
34.	"The Dark Warrior Lord"	1:30
35.	"D'urge"	5:48
36.	"Man's Darkest Hour"	0:53
37.	"Epiphany"	7:09
38.	"I'm Going Anyway"	1:43
39.	"The Healing"	5:13
40.	"The Golden Mic"	1:10
41.	"The Bounce"	5:38

== Personnel ==
- Soweto Kinch – rap vocals, alto saxophone (1, 4, 8, 10, 17, 19, 25, 29, 35, 39, 41), tenor saxophone (6, 8, 12, 21, 25, 31, 37), Fender Rhodes (39), All beats/programming
- Shabaka Hutchings – tenor saxophone (2, 10, 29, 35, 39, 41), clarinet (4, 33)
- Karl Rasheed-Abel – all live double bass
- Graham Godfrey – all live drums
- Julian Joseph – vocals (17, 19)
- Cleveland Watkiss – vocals (27)
- Eska Mtungwazi – vocals (12, 31)
- Rachel Maby – vocals (37, all interludes)

The cast

- Mike Smith: Toyin Omari-Kinch
- Mike's inner thoughts: Soweto Kinch
- The Sage: Jonathan Owen
- Kate Advo (A+R): Tessa Walker
- Muse 1: Yvette Harris
- Muse 2: Jonzi D
- The Choir: Rachel Maby
- Buzzy Sparxx: Dominic 'Silverchet' Davids
- Taxi Driver: Joel Cottrell
- Police Man in 'Pressure': Tony Platt
- Bajan Tube Announcer: Jonzi D
- Concierge: David Timothy
- Waitress: Iza Korsak
- Jada: Terri Facey
- Jenni Mimi Fresh
- Dark Angel: Tyrone Huggins
- Amusement Arcade Worker: Jonzi D
- Kaos: Tony "Jamo" Morrison
- Cynthia: Janine Small
- Razor Sharp: Daniel Anderson
