= Conversations with the Unseen =

Studio album by Soweto Kinch
- Released: 2003
- Recorded: December 2002 – January 2003 at Mark Angelo Studios, London
- Genre: Jazz, hip-hop
- Length: 74:11
- Label: Dune Records
- Producer: Jason Yarde

Soweto Kinch chronology
Conversations with the Unseen (2003)	A Life in the Day of B19: Tales of the Tower Block (2006)

Professional ratings
Review scores
Source	Rating
AllMusic	3/5 stars
The Penguin Guide to Jazz Recordings	3/4 stars

Conversations with the Unseen is a 2003 album by British saxophonist Soweto Kinch. The album was nominated for the 2003 Mercury Prize.

== Track listing ==
All tracks are written by Soweto Kinch.

1. "Intro" (2:10)
2. "Doxology" (9:14)
3. "Conversations with the Unseen" (7:34)
4. "Elision" (5:56)
5. "Spokes and Pedals" (6:29)
6. "Intermission - Split Decision" (8:19)
7. "Snakehips" (7:39)
8. "Mungo's Adventure" (7:06)
9. "The Flame-Thrower" (2:59)
10. "Equiano's Tears" (10:01)
11. "Good Nyooz" (3:21)
12. "Outro" (3:23)

== Personnel ==
- Soweto Kinch – alto saxophone, rap vocals
- Femi Temowo – guitar
- Michael Olatuja – bass
- Troy Miller – drums
- Eska Mtungwazi – vocals (tracks 1, 11, 12)
- Abram Wilson – trumpet and vocals on track 6
