= War in a Rack =

EP by Soweto Kinch
- Released: 2009
- Recorded: Recorded at the Pentalk Lab, Riverfront, Newport, UK
- Genre: Hip Hop
- Length: 17:20
- Label: Soweto Kinch Recordings
- Producer: Soweto Kinch

War in a Rack is a 2009 EP by Soweto Kinch.

== Track listing ==
All tracks are written by Soweto Kinch.

1. War in a Rack Intro (0:56)
2. Can't Hold Me Down (3:31)
3. B**ch Slap (2:24)
4. Declaration of War (3:47)
5. Head for the Hills (3:36)
6. Sound the Alert (3:06)

== Personnel ==
- Soweto Kinch
- Francis Mott
- C4sey
- Tumi
- Verbal Kent
