= Riding House Street =

Street in London, England

Coordinates: 51°31′5.48″N 0°8′32.56″W

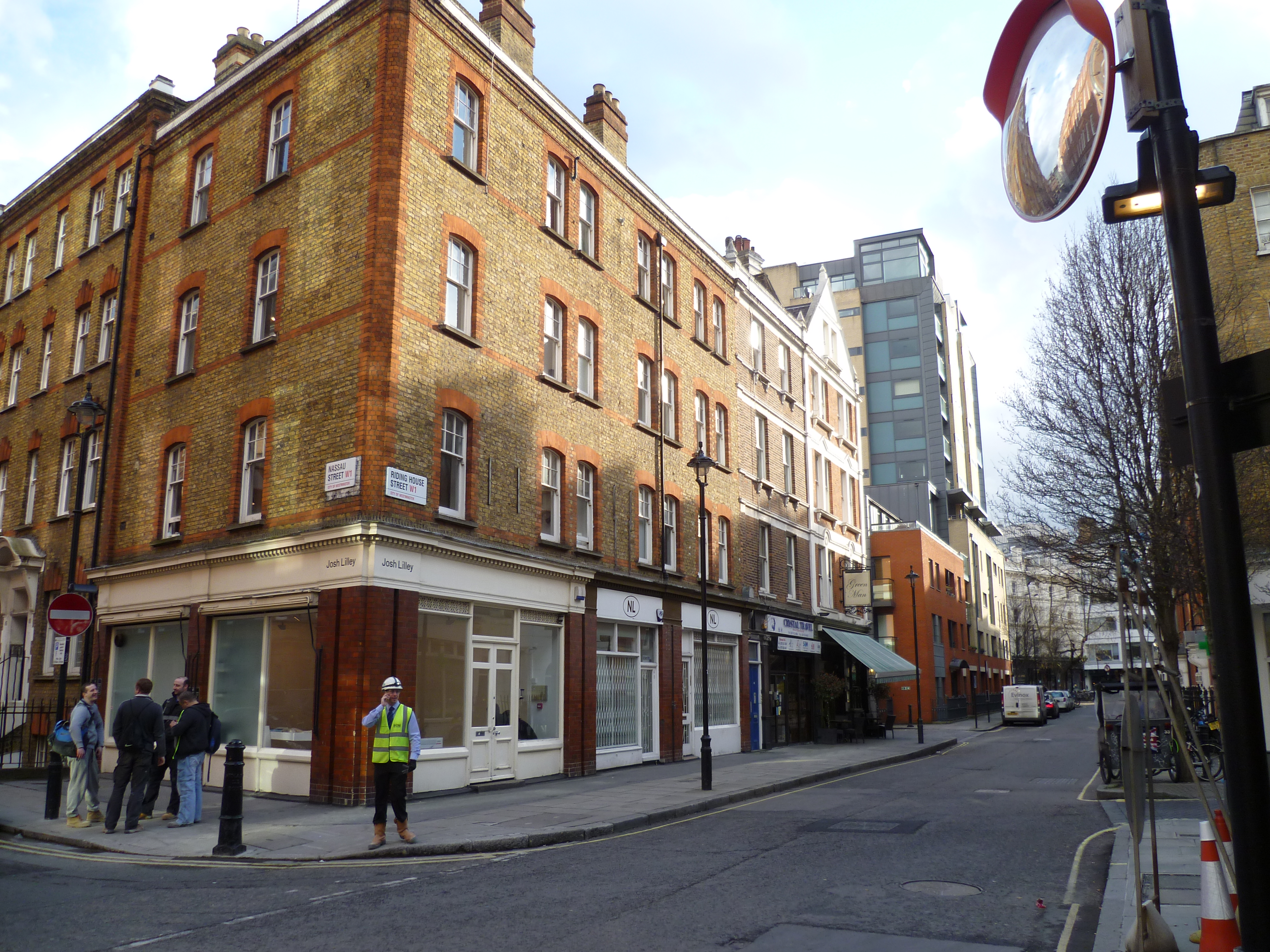
Riding House Street, 2015

Riding House Street is a street in central London in the City of Westminster.

== History ==
Riding House Street (originally Lane) started off as a straight and narrow connection between Edward Street in the west and Great Titchfield Street in the east. Its name derives from a riding house and barracks occupied by the First Troop of Horse Grenadier Guards from 1726 to 1788.

== Location ==
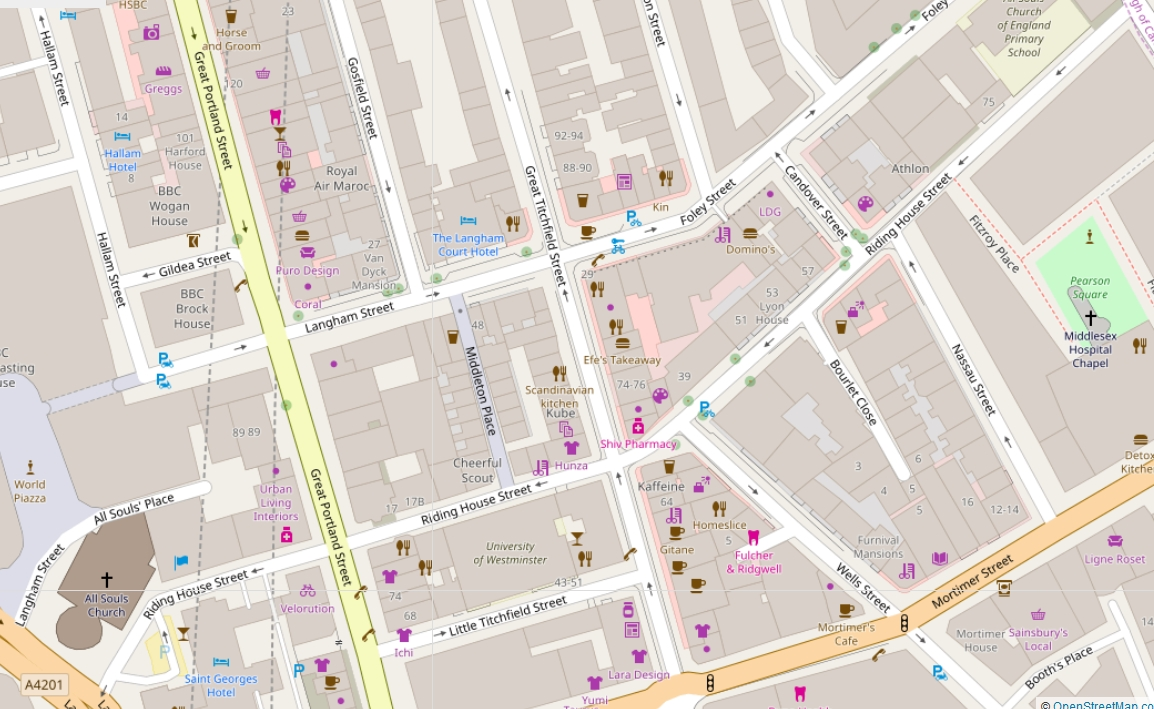
Map of Riding House Street

Riding House Street runs roughly north-east from Langham Place in the west, adjacent to the BBC's Broadcasting House, to Cleveland Street in the east. The street is crossed on its western side by Great Portland Street and Great Titchfield Street. In the east, Wells Street, Bourlet Close and Nassau Street all join Riding House Street on its south side and Candover Street on the north side.

== Notable buildings ==
There are two listed buildings in the street:

=== 1 and 3 Riding House Street ===
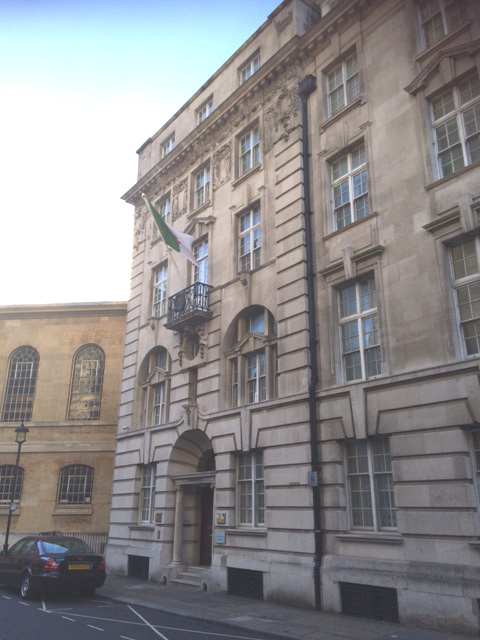
1 & 3 Riding House Street in 2016

Currently the Algerian Embassy, this building was built by T. Phillips Figgis in 1910 (No. 1), with an additional wing in 1914 (No. 3). It was purpose-built to house the London Radium Institute, established in 1909 and opened in August 1911. It provided outpatient care based on the methods used by the Curies in Paris. Wealthier patients could enter through the front entrance in Riding House Street with a poor door for the "necessitous" in All Souls Place. In 1938 the Radium Institute was absorbed by the Mount Vernon Hospital, with the building housing the central offices and outpatients’ department for the enlarged organisation. The building was sold following the Second World War and housed the National Society for the Prevention of Cruelty to Children before eventually becoming the home of the Algerian Embassy in 2012.

=== 59 and 61 Riding House Street ===
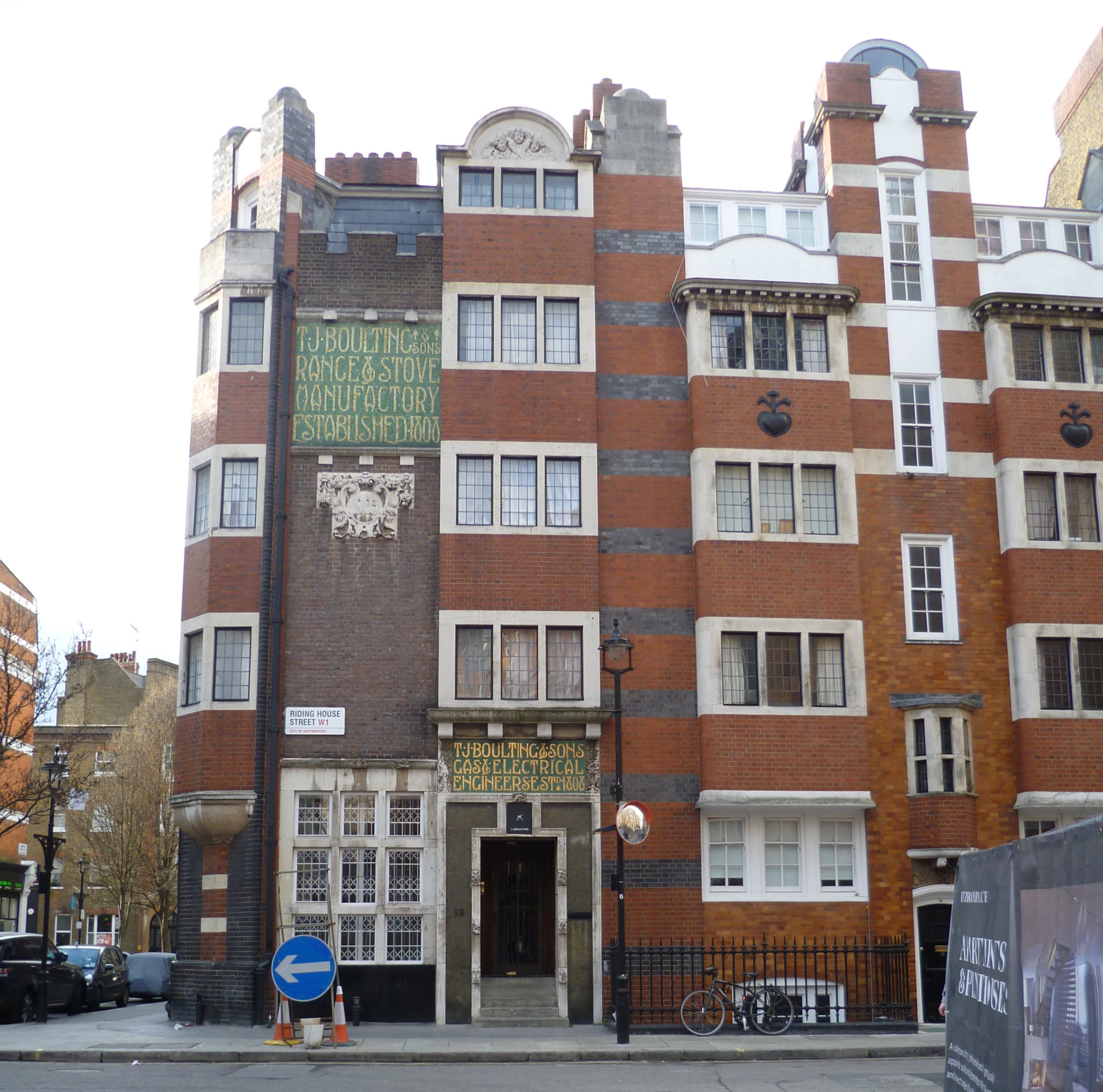
Former premises of T.J. Boulting & Sons, 59 & 61 Riding House Street

- T. J. Boulting Gallery, 59 and 61.

== Notable residents ==
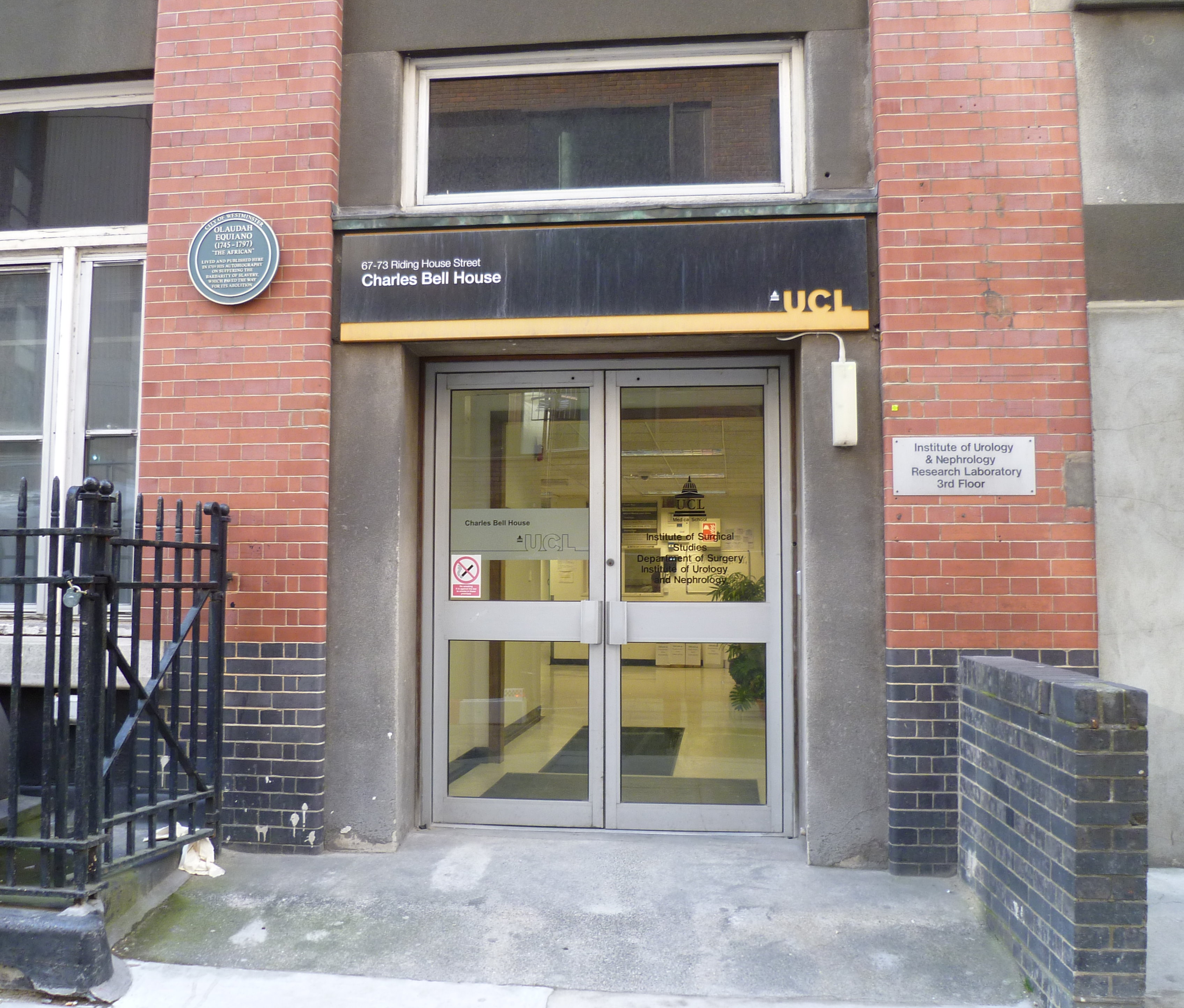
Green plaque honouring Olaudah Equiano

Olaudah Equiano lived at what is now 73 Riding House Street, formerly 10 Union Street, from which he published The Interesting Narrative of the Life of Olaudah Equiano in 1789. A City of Westminster commemorative green plaque was unveiled there on 11 October 2000.
