= Malcolm Morris (dermatologist) =

English surgeon

Malcolm Alexander Morris (17 August 1849 – 19 February 1924) was an English surgeon who specialised in skin diseases and was the founding president of the British Association of Dermatologists. He was also well known for his role in medical publishing. He studied medicine at St Mary's Hospital.

Following his death, a memorial fund was established to fund an annual lecture on "the preventive aspects of public health and dermatology".

== Publishing ==
Morris became the medical editor for Cassell & Co. in the 1880s. He started by editing the Book of Health, which included contributions by William Savory, Lauder Brunton and Joseph Fayrer. He was also responsible for publishing works by Frederick Treves, whom he was to succeed as chair of the London Radium Institute.
