= Paul Lovejoy =

Canadian historian

Paul Ellsworth Lovejoy
- Born: 6 May 1943 (age 83); Girard, Pennsylvania
- Education: University of Wisconsin (PhD)
- Writing career
- Subjects: African History, African Diaspora, Slavery

Paul Ellsworth Lovejoy is a Canadian historian in African history and African diaspora history. He is an Emeritus Professor at York University in Canada, where he was a Distinguished Research Professor and holder of a Canada Research Chair. He is also a Fellow of the Royal Society of Canada.

== Work ==
Lovejoy is the founding director of the Harriet Tubman Institute for Research on Africa and its Diasporas. He is the series editor of the Harriet Tubman Series of books on the African Diaspora.

== Bibliography ==
- Caravans of kola: The Hausa kola trade, 1700-1900 (1 Jan 1980)
- Salt of the Desert Sun: A History of Salt Production and Trade in the Central Sudan (31 May 1986)
- Slow Death for Slavery: The Course of Abolition in Northern Nigeria 1897-1936 (27 August 1993)
- Transformations in Slavery: A History of Slavery in Africa (28 August 2000)
- Pawnship, Slavery, and Colonialism in Africa (1 Jan 2003)
- Enslaving Connections: Changing Cultures of Africa and Brazil during the Era of Slavery (1 September 2003)
- Slavery on the Frontiers of Islam (1 June 2004)
- Hugh Clapperton into the Interior of Africa: Records of the Second Expedition, 1825-1827 (14 March 2005)
- Slavery, Commerce and Production in West Africa (15 May 2005)
- Ecology and Ethnography of Muslim Trade in West Africa (15 August 2005)
- Africa and Trans-Atlantic Memories: Literary and Aesthetic Manifestations of Diaspora and History (3 June 2008)
- Identity in the Shadow of Slavery (3 August 2009)
- Repercussions of the Atlantic Slave Trade: The Interior of the Bight of Biafra and the African Diaspora (22 October 2010)
- Crossing Memories: Slavery and African Diaspora (9 Mar 2011)
- Transformations in Slavery: A History of Slavery in Africa (10 October 2011)
- The Transatlantic Slave Trade and Slavery (5 December 2012)
- Consuming Habits: Global and Historical Perspectives on how Cultures define drugs: Drugs in History and Anthropology (8 April 2014)
- Slavery, Abolition and the Transition to Colonialism in Sierra Leone (30 October 2014)
- Jihad in West Africa during the Age of Revolutions (30 November 2016)
- Calabar on the Cross River: Historical and Cultural Studies (22 May 2017)
- Slavery in the Global Diaspora of Africa (7 Mar 2019)
