= The Interesting Narrative of the Life of Olaudah Equiano =

1789 autobiography of Olaudah Equiano

The Interesting Narrative of the Life of Olaudah Equiano, Or Gustavus Vassa, The African
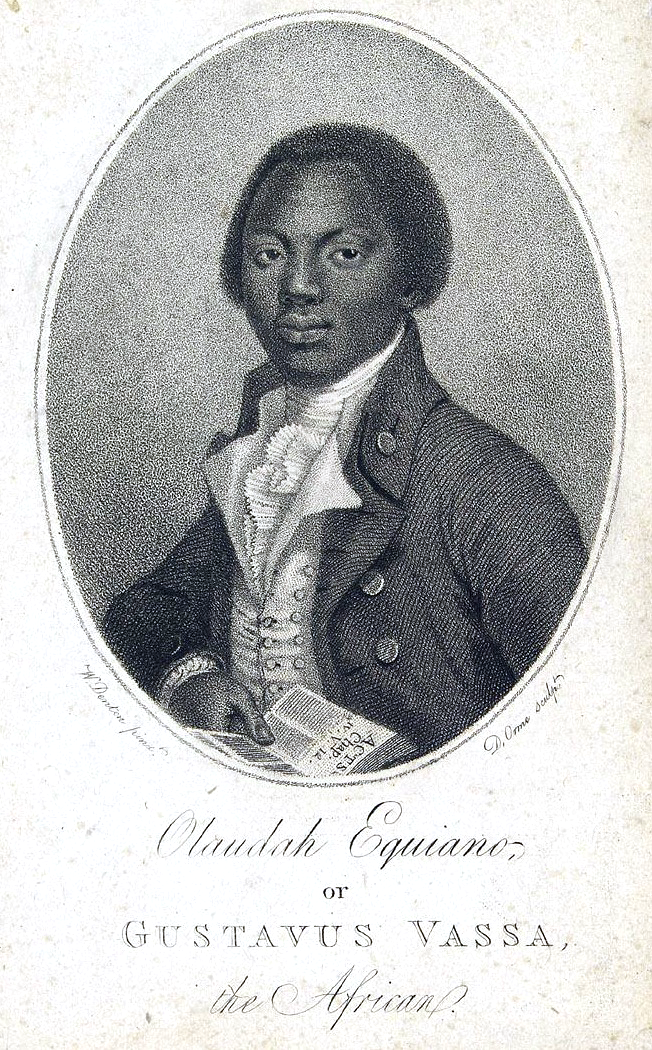
- Cover image
- Author: Olaudah Equiano
- Language: English
- Genre: Autobiography, slave narrative
- Publication date: 1789
- Publication place: Great Britain
- OCLC: 23633870
- Dewey Decimal: 305.567092
- LC Class: HT869.E6 A3 1794
- Text: The Interesting Narrative of the Life of Olaudah Equiano, Or Gustavus Vassa, The African at Wikisource

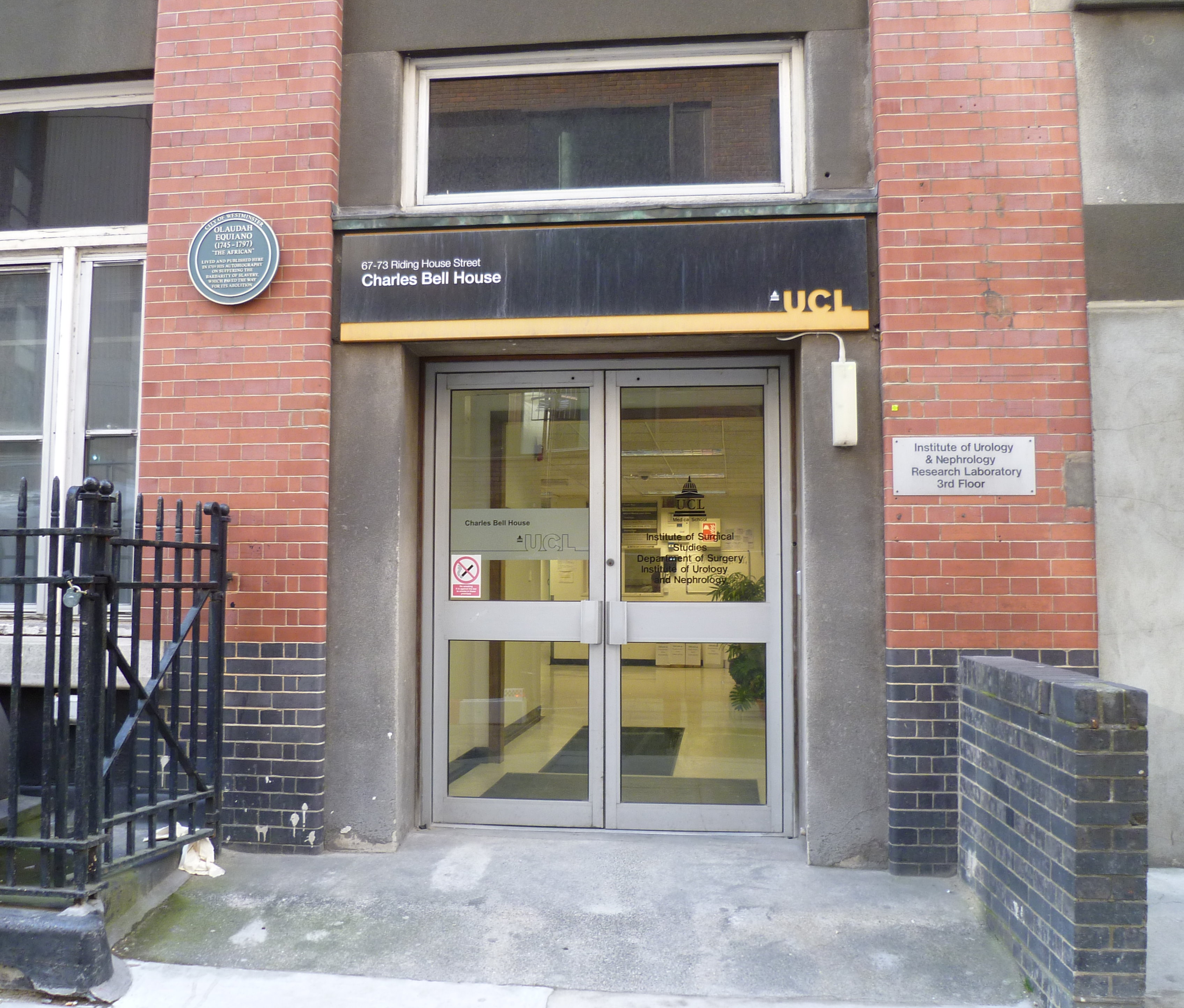
The green plaque at Riding House Street, London, commemorates where Equiano lived and published his narrative.

The Interesting Narrative of the Life of Olaudah Equiano, Or Gustavus Vassa, The African, first published in 1789 in London, is the autobiography of Olaudah Equiano (c. 1745 – 31 March 1797), an African from what is now Nigeria who was enslaved in childhood and eventually bought his freedom and became an abolitionist in the United Kingdom.

The narrative is argued to represent a variety of styles, such as a slavery narrative, travel narrative, and spiritual narrative. The book describes Equiano's time spent in enslavement, and keeps track of his attempts at becoming an independent man through his study of the Bible, and his success in the end in gaining his own freedom and in business thereafter.

== Main themes ==
- Slavery in West Africa vs. slavery in the Americas
- The African slave's voyage from Africa (Igbo Land) to the Americas and England
- The cross-cultural and geopolitical journey from slavery to freedom and heathenism to Christianity.

== Summary ==
=== Preface ===
Before Chapter 1, Equiano writes: "An invidious falsehood having appeared in the Oracle of the 25th, and the Star of the 27th of April 1792, with a view, to hurt my character, and to discredit and prevent the sale of my Narrative." Like many literary works written by black people during this time, Equiano's work was discredited as a false presentation of his slavery experience. To combat these accusations, Equiano includes a set of letters written by white people who "knew me when I first arrived in England and could speak no language but that of Africa." In his article "Preface to Blackness: Text and Pretext", Henry Louis Gates Jr. discusses the use of prefaces by black authors to humanize their being, which in turn made their work credible. Equiano includes this preface to avoid further discrediting.

=== Chapter 1 ===
Equiano opens his narrative with an explanation of his struggle to write a memoir. He is empathetic about hardships that memoir writers experience. He explains that they often have to defend themselves against those who question their work. He apologizes to his readers in advance for not having the most exciting story, but hopes it helps other slaves in his position. He states, "I am neither a saint, a hero, nor a tyrant." He begins his story with a description of his homeland and the district in which he was born. He was born in the Kingdom of Benin, a part of Guinea. He details his district, Eboe (now Nigeria), and the isolation of Essake, the small province of his birth in 1745.

Equiano describes that Eboe (now known as Igboland) had well established rules and laws of governing. Their systems of marriage and law were strictly enforced. His father—a titled elder in the district—was in charge of punishing criminals and resolving conflicts within their society. Within the district, women were held to higher standards than men. Marriage was seen as extremely important. The bride's family was responsible for providing gifts for the family of the husband, and the wife was "owned by her husband".

Dancing was a huge part of the culture within the kingdom. All dancing was separated into four divisions of groups of people, and they all represented key life events. The kingdom was made up of many musicians, singers, poets, dancers, and artists. The people of the kingdom lived a simple life. Nothing was luxurious. Clothes and homes were very plain and clean. The only luxuries they had were perfumes and on occasion alcohol. Women were in charge of creating clothing for the men and women to wear. Agriculture was the primary occupation, because the kingdom sat on rich soil and facilitated abundant growth. Though slaves were present in the kingdom, only those who were prisoners of war or convicted criminals were traded in Eboe.

Hardships were brought about by an unusual number of locusts and constant arbitrary wars with other districts. If another district's chief waged war and won, they would acquire all slaves belonging to their opponent. In the event of a loss, chiefs were put to death. Religion was extremely important in Equiano's society. The people of Eboe believed in one "Creator", who lived in the sun and was in charge of major occurrences: life, death, and war. They believed that those who died transmigrated into spirits, but their friends and family who did not transmigrate protected them from evil spirits. They also believed in circumcision. Equiano compared this practice of circumcision to that of the Jews.

Equiano also explains the customs of his people. Children were named after events or virtues. Olaudah meant fortune, but it also served as a symbol of command of speech and his demanding voice. Two of the core values of the Eboe religion were cleanliness and decency. The touching of women during their menstrual cycle and the touching of dead bodies were seen as unclean. As Equiano discusses his people, he explains the fear of poisonous plants and venomous snakes within the community. He describes an instance where a snake slithered through his legs without harming him. He considered himself extremely lucky.

Equiano makes numerous references to the similarity between the Jews and his people. Like the Jews, not only did his people practice circumcision, but they also practiced sacrificing, burnt offerings, and purification. He explains how Abraham's wife was African, and that the skin colour of Eboan Africans and modern Jews differs due to the climate. At the end of the first chapter, Equiano asserts that Africans were not inferior people; the Europeans considered them as such because they were ignorant of African languages, history, and customs. He explains it is important to remember the ancestors of the Europeans were once uncivilized barbarians. He states, "Understanding is not confined to feature or colour."

=== Chapter 2 ===
Equiano explains how he and his sister were kidnapped and forced to travel with their captors for a time until the two children were separated. Equiano becomes the slave-companion to the children of a wealthy chieftain. He stays with them for about a month until he accidentally kills one of his master's chickens and runs away. Equiano hides in the shrubbery and woods surrounding his master's village, but after several days without food, steals away into his master's kitchen to eat. Exhausted, Equiano falls asleep in the kitchen and is discovered by another slave who interceded with the master for Equiano. The master is forgiving and insists that Equiano shall not be harmed.

Soon after, Equiano is sold to a group of travelers. One day, his sister appears with her master at the house and they share a joyous reunion; however, she and her company leave, and Equiano never sees his sister again. Equiano is eventually sold to a wealthy widow and her young son. Equiano lives almost as an equal among them and is very happy until he is again taken away and forced to travel with "heathens" to the seacoast.

Equiano is forced onto a slave ship and spends the next several weeks on the ship under terrible conditions. He points out the "closeness of the place, and the heat of the climate added to the number in the ship" suffocates them; some slaves even preferred to drown, and one was saved only to be flogged later, as he had chosen to die rather than accept slavery. At last they reach the island of Barbados, where Equiano and all the other slaves are separated and sold. The author mentions the impact of their selling away, as "on the signal given, (as the beat of a drum), the buyers rush at once into the yard where they are confined, and make the choice of that parcel they like best. [...] The noise and clamor [...] serve not a little to increase the apprehension of the Terrified Africans."

Throughout the passage, Equiano refers to white people as cruel, greedy, and mean. He is very surprised by the way they relate to each other, as they are even cruel between them, not only to the slaves. However, as he meets more white people and learns about their culture he comes to the conclusion that the white men are not inherently evil but that institutional slavery has made them cruel and callous.

=== Chapter 3 ===
Equiano is lonely at the new plantation and completes his work alone. One day, while in the kitchen, he is shocked at the sight of one of the women slaves wearing an iron muzzle. As he continues looking around the house he notices a watch on the wall and a painting. He is disconcerted by both of these objects because he fears they are spying for the Master. On the plantation, he is called "Jacob", though earlier he had been called "Michael". One day, a man called Michael Henry Pascal comes to the Master's house, wanting to purchase Equiano. He pays £30 to £40 for him and Equiano leaves to work on a ship. He prefers life at sea because his shipmates are nicer to him and he eats better than previously. He is again renamed, as "Gustavus Vassa". Although he does not like the name, he does not mind it in order not be punished. On the ship he develops a friendship with a man named Richard Baker. Richard becomes a companion and interpreter for Equiano, who does not understand the language spoken by everyone else on board. He becomes very close to Richard and mourns him deeply when Richard leaves to his family in 1759.

=== Chapter 4 ===
It has now been two or three years since Equiano first came to England. He has spent the majority of his time at sea. He does not mind his work and, as he has spent a lot of time there, he almost considers himself an Englishman. He can speak English decently, and can understand everything said to him. He also starts to view the others on the ship as his superiors, aspiring to be like them instead of seeing them as barbaric and intimidating. Equiano goes to London with his Master and is sent to serve for the Guerins. He likes it there and they provide him with an education. He is baptized with the help of Miss Guerins. After a while, his Master is called back to sea, so Equiano must leave school to work for him. They go to Gibraltar, where he gets cheap fruits and tells the story of losing his sister. A person who lived in the area tells him that he saw his sister and consequently takes him to her, but the person is in fact mistaken. Equiano meets Daniel Queen while working for his Master, and Queen quickly becomes a big part of his life, teaching him about religion, education, and how to shave. Equiano views him almost like a father and tries to repay him with sugar or tobacco whenever he can afford it. In December, the ship leaves to go to London following rumours of peace and the end of the war. When they arrive in London, his Master gives him away to Captain Doran, even though he does not want to go.

=== Chapter 5 ===
In mid-May, Equiano is summoned by Captain Doran and told he had been sold to a new Master called Robert King. King had wanted to purchase him because he liked his character and his work ethic. Other people offer King up to one hundred guineas for Equiano. King is good to Equiano and says he will put him in school and fit him for a clerk. King feeds his slaves well, which he was sometimes criticized for. King's philosophy is that the better a slave is fed; the harder they will work. King has Equiano perform gauging (the measurement of a boat) while on the ship. He also puts Equiano in charge of the Negro cargo on the ship. While working for King, Equiano sees clerks and other white men rape women, which makes him angry, because he can do nothing about it.

=== Chapter 6 ===
Equiano opens the chapter by stating that he witnessed many evil and unfair events as a slave, and recounts a specific event that happened in 1763. He and a companion were trying to sell limes and oranges that were in bags. Two white men came up to them and took the fruit away from them. They begged them for the bags back and explained that it was everything they owned, but the white men threatened to flog them if they continued begging. They walked away because they were scared, but after a while they went back to the house and asked for their belongings back again. The men gave them two of the three bags back. The bag that they kept was all of Equiano's companion's fruit, so Equiano shared one-third of his fruit. They went off to sell the fruit and ended up getting 37 bits for it, which surprised them. During this time, Equiano started working as a sailor and selling and trading items like gin and tumblers. When he was in the West Indies, he witnessed Joseph Clipson, a free mulatto man, being taken into slavery. Equiano notes that this happened a lot in the area, and consequently decides he cannot be free until he leaves the West Indies. He starts to save the money he earns to buy his freedom.

Before they leave for a trip to Philadelphia, his captain hears a rumour that Equiano has plans to escape. The Master reminds Equiano how valuable he is, and that he will find him and get him back if he tries to run away. Equiano explains that he has no plans to escape, and that if he had wanted to run away, he would have done it by now, given all the freedom the Master and the captain give him. The captain confirms Equiano's explanation and decides it was indeed only a rumour. Equiano tells the Master then that he is interested in buying his freedom eventually.

When they get to Philadelphia, Equiano goes to sell what his Master gave him and talks to Mrs. Davis, a wise woman who reveals secrets and foretells events. She tells him he will not remain in slavery for long. The ship continues on to Georgia and, while they are there, Doctor Perkins beats Equiano and leaves him lying on the ground, unable to move. Police pick him up and put him in jail. After he does not return overnight, the captain discovers what has happened and gets him out of jail. He also has the best doctors treat him. He tries to sue Doctor Perkins, but a lawyer explains that there is not a case because Equiano is a black man. Equiano slowly recovers and gets back to work.

=== Chapter 7 ===
Equiano grows closer to purchasing his freedom with the money he has saved from selling items. His ship was supposed to go to Montserrat—where he thought he would get the last of the money he needed—but the crew receives an order to go to St. Eustatia and then Georgia. He sells more items and earns enough money to buy his freedom. He goes to the captain to consult with him about what to say to his Master. The captain tells him to come when he and the Master have breakfast. That day, he offers to purchase his own freedom for 40 pounds. With a little convincing from the captain, Equiano's master agrees, and Equiano is granted complete freedom. In the succeeding months, the captain dies. Equiano writes, "had it pleased Providence, that he [the captain] had died about five months before, I verily believe I should not have obtained my freedom when I did." The chapter ends with Equiano's arrival in Montserrat.

=== Chapter 8 ===
Equiano expresses his desires to return to England. He has recurring dreams of the ship crashing, and on the third night of his travels, his fears come true as the ship collides with a rock. Although Equiano is terrified and feels sure he is going to die, he is able to collect himself and prevent the ship from crashing. This traumatic event also causes him to reflect on his own morals and his relationship with God. Eventually, the crew end up on an island in the Bahamas, and are able to find another ship heading to New Providence. Once they reach their destination, Equiano goes to work on another ship headed for Georgia. After a few interesting interactions in Georgia, he finds a spot on a ship destined for Martinique. Before leaving for the island, Equiano comes across a black woman who needed a church burial service for her child. No white person will help her, so Equiano agrees to perform the role of a parson before he departs for his journey.

=== Chapter 9 ===
Chapter 9 describes Equiano's many journeys, including one to the North Pole with the scientist Doctor Irving, the inventor of a way to distil fresh drinking water. "The author arrives at Martinico--Meets with new difficulties--Gets to Montserrat, where he takes leave of his old master, and sails for England--Meets Capt. ascal--Learns the French horn--Hires himself with Doctor rving, where he learns to freshen sea water--Leaves the doctor, and goes a voyage to Turkey and Portugal; and afterwards goes a voyage to Grenada, and another to amaica--Returns to the Doctor, and they embark together on a voyage to the North Pole, with the Hon. Capt. Phipps--Some account of that voyage, and the dangers the author was in--He returns to England."

=== Chapter 10 ===
"The author leaves Doctor Irving and engages on board a Turkey ship—Account of a black man's being kidnapped on board and sent to the West Indies, and the author's fruitless endeavours to procure his freedom—Some account of the manner of the author's conversion to the faith of Jesus Christ." Throughout this chapter, Equiano becomes greatly concerned with salvation and guaranteeing his place in heaven. After learning about predestination from multiple figures, Equiano worries he will never be able to fully repent and reach heaven. He contemplates suicide but does not wish to upset God by committing what was generally seen as a sin.

=== Chapter 11 ===
"The author embarks on board a ship bound for Cadiz—Is near being shipwrecked—Goes to Malaga—Remarkable fine cathedral there—The author disputes with a popish priest—Picking up eleven miserable men at sea in returning to England—Engages again with Doctor Irving to accompany him to Jamaica and the Mosquito Shore—Meets with an Indian prince on board—The author attempts to instruct him in the truths of the Gospel—Frustrated by the bad example of some in the ship—They arrive on the Mosquito Shore with some slaves they purchased at Jamaica, and begin to cultivate a plantation—Some account of the manners and customs of the Mosquito Indians—Successful device of the author's to quell a riot among them—Curious entertainment given by them to Doctor Irving and the author, who leaves the shore and goes for Jamaica—Is barbarously treated by a man with whom he engaged for his passage—Escapes and goes to the Mosquito admiral, who treats him kindly—He gets another vessel and goes on board—Instances of bad treatment—Meets Doctor Irving—Gets to Jamaica—Is cheated by his captain—Leaves the Doctor and goes for England."

=== Chapter 12 ===
"Different transactions of the author's life till the present time—His application to the late Bishop of London to be appointed a missionary to Africa—Some account of his share in the conduct of the late expedition to Sierra Leona—Petition to the Queen—Conclusion."

== Controversy about origins ==
Originally published in 1789, The Interesting Narrative of the Life of Olaudah Equiano, or Gustavus Vassa, The African, played a large role in "[altering] public opinion" towards the debate over abolition in Britain. Equiano was viewed as "an authority" in relation to the slave trade. His claims of being born in Eboe (now southern Nigeria) and being captured and traded as a child gave him definite credibility. However, several people questioned his credibility in the 1790s in order to challenge rising abolitionist sentiments. There were rumours that Equiano was actually born in the West Indies, but these claims were thrown away for being "politically motivated."

Paul Edwards edited The Interesting Narrative of the Life of Olaudah Equiano, Or Gustavus Vassa, The African, in 1967 and sparked further debate about the validity of the story's origins.

In 1999, Vincent Carretta published findings of two records that questioned Equiano's birthplace in Africa. Carretta found Equiano's baptismal record dated 9 February 1759 from St Margaret's Church in Westminster, London, where Equiano was recorded as "Gustavus Vassa, a Black born in Carolina, 12 years old", and a naval muster roll from 1773 where Equiano likewise identified his birthplace as "South Carolina". These documents were enough for Carretta to believe that Equiano's claims about his early life were "probably fictitious". Aside from contradicting Equiano's account directly, these records suggested that, even if Equiano were born in Africa, he would have been at most seven or eight years old when he was sold into slavery (given that he must have been purchased by Michael Henry Pascal in Virginia no later than December 1754). This made Carretta doubt the reliability of Equiano's first-hand descriptions of his home "country" and "countrymen". Carretta believes his findings indicate Equiano had borrowed his account of Africa from others, and said the timing of the publication was not an accident. Carretta noted "the revelation that Gustavus Vassa was a native-born Igbo originally named Olaudah Equiano appears to have evolved during 1788 in response to the needs of the abolitionist movement."

Carretta explains that Equiano presumably knew what parts of his story could be corroborated by others, and, more importantly if he was combining fiction with fact, what parts could not easily be contradicted.

"Equiano's fellow abolitionists were calling for precisely the kind of account of Africa and the Middle Passage that he supplied. Because only a native African would have experienced the Middle Passage, the abolitionist movement needed an African, not an African-American, voice. Equiano's autobiography corroborated and even explicitly drew upon earlier reports of Africa and the Middle Passage by some white observers, and challenged those of others."

Paul E. Lovejoy disputes Carretta's claim that Vassa was born in South Carolina because of Vassa's knowledge of the Igbo society. Lovejoy refers to Equiano as Vassa because he never used his African name until he wrote his narrative. Lovejoy believes Vassa's description of his country and his people is sufficient confirmation that he was born where he said he was, and based on when boys received the ichi scarification, that he was about 11 when he was kidnapped, as he claims, which suggests a birth date of about 1742, not 1745 or 1747. Lovejoy argues that Equiano could not have made up his origins because he would have been too young.

"If Carretta is correct about Vassa's age at the time of baptism, accepting the documentary evidence, then he was too young to have created a complex fraud about origins. The fraud must have been perpetrated later, but when? Certainly the baptismal record cannot be used as proof that he committed fraud, only that his godparents might have."

Lovejoy also believes Equiano's godparents, the Guerins and Pascals, wanted the public to think that Vassa was a creole instead of being a fully Black man born in Africa. He claims that this was because the perceived higher status of Creoles in West Indian society and Equiano's mastery of English.

In 2007, Carretta wrote a response to Lovejoy's claims about Equiano's godparents, saying: "Lovejoy can offer no evidence for such a desire or perception." He also argues, "Equiano's age on the 1759 baptismal record to be off by a year or two before puberty is plausible. But to have it off by five years, as Lovejoy contends, would place Equiano well into puberty at the age of 17, when he would have been far more likely to have had a say in, and later remembered, what was recorded. And his godparents and witnesses should have noticed the difference between a child and an adolescent."

== Reception ==
The Interesting Narrative of the Life of Olaudah Equiano was one of the first widely-read slave narratives. Nine editions were printed during the author's lifetime, and it was translated into Dutch and German. The structure and rhetorical strategies of the book were influential and created a model for subsequent slave narratives. The different kinds of aspects and ideas in his narrative, such as travel, religion, and slavery, cause some readers to debate what kind of narrative his writing is: a slavery narrative, a spiritual narrative, or a travel narrative.

The work has proven so influential in the study of African and African-American literature that it is frequently taught in both English literature and history classrooms in universities. The work has also been republished in the Heinemann African Writers Series.
