= Soweto Kinch =

British jazz saxophonist and rapper (born 1978)

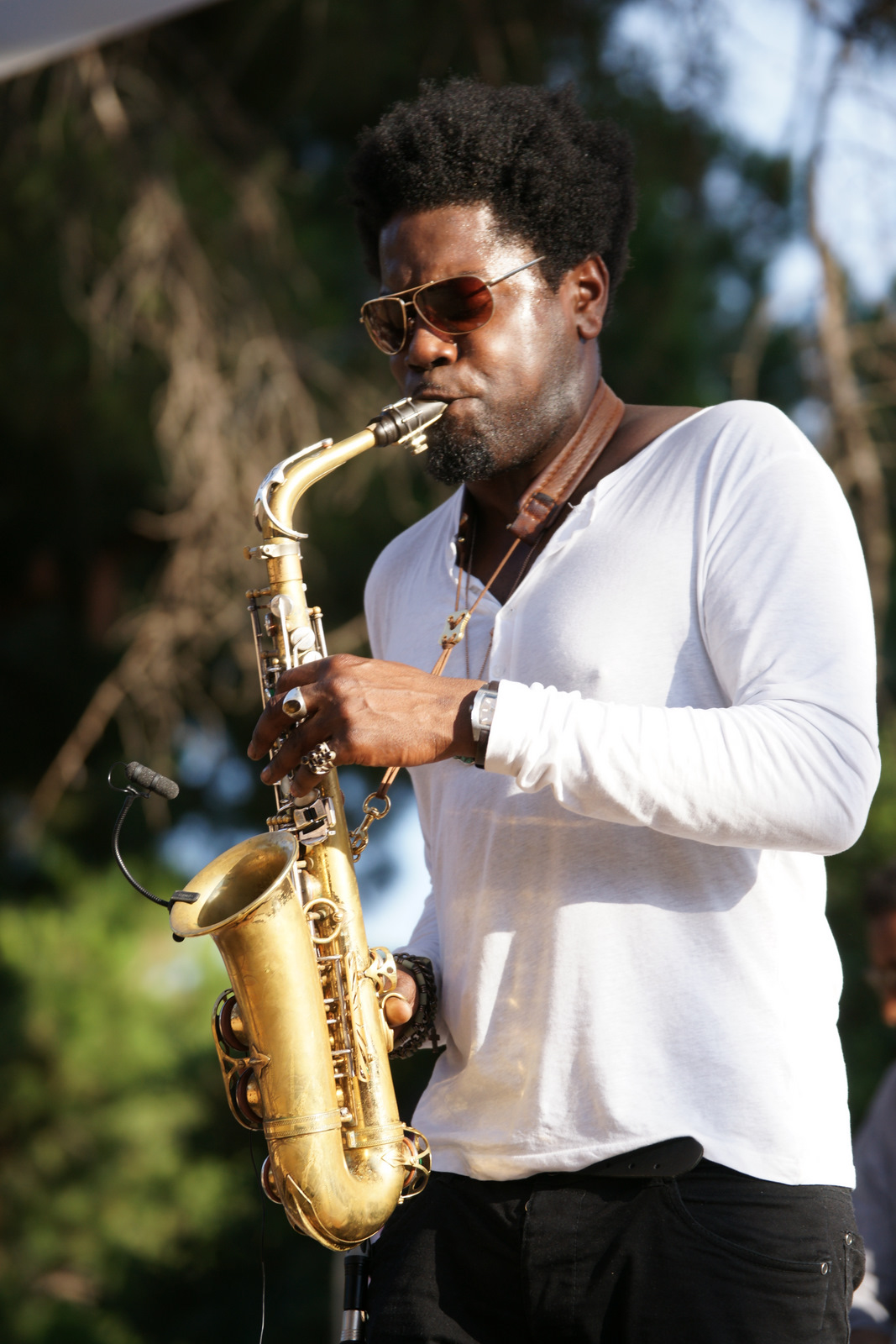

Background information
- Born: Soweto Omar Kinch; 10 January 1978 (age 48); London, England, UK
- Genre: Jazz
- Occupation: Musician
- Instruments: Alto saxophone, tenor saxophone, vocals
- Website: soweto-kinch.com
- Education: Hertford College, Oxford University
- Parents: Don Kinch (father); Yvette Harris (mother)

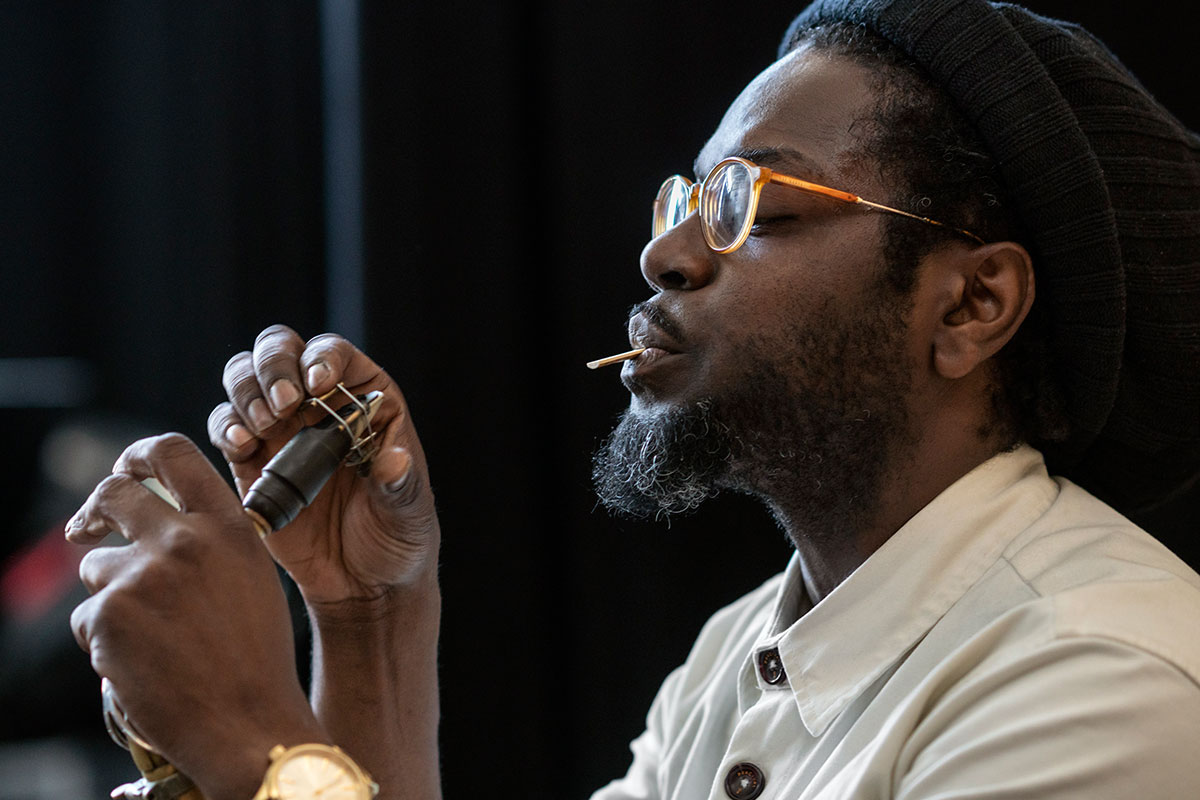
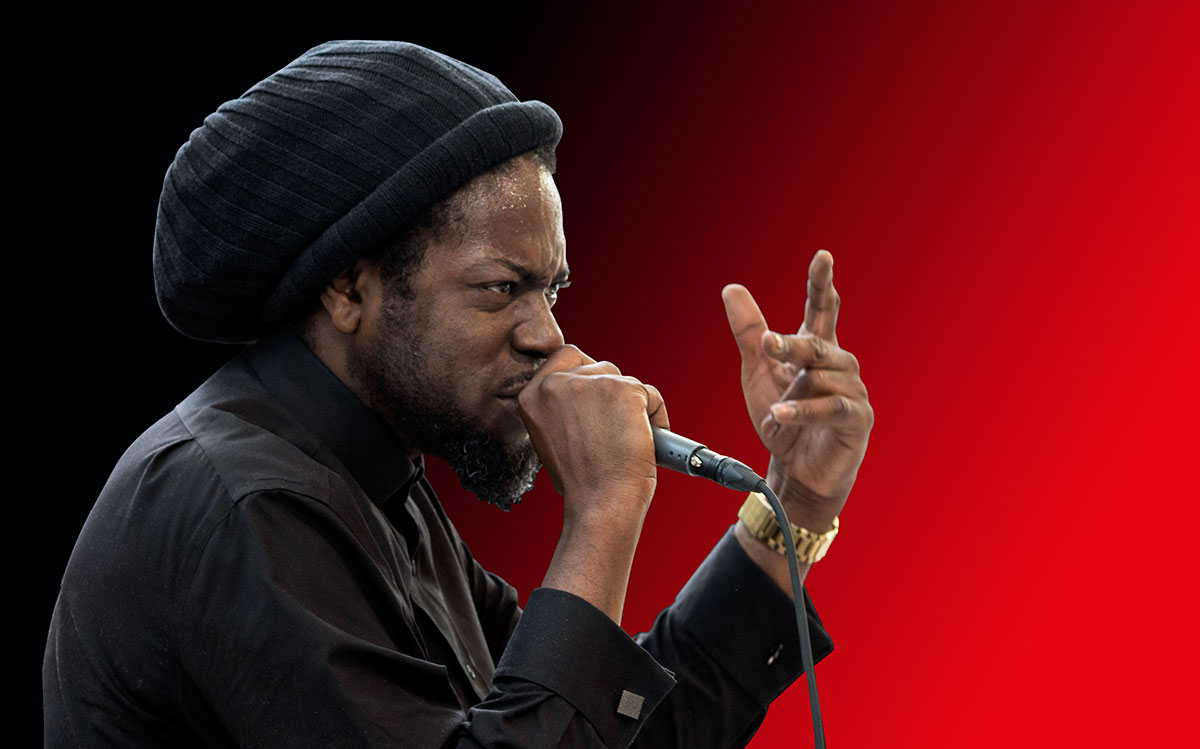
Kinch in Aarhus, Denmark (2023), with Blood Sweat Drum'n'Bass Big Band

Soweto Kinch (born 10 January 1978) is a British jazz saxophonist and rapper.

== Biography ==
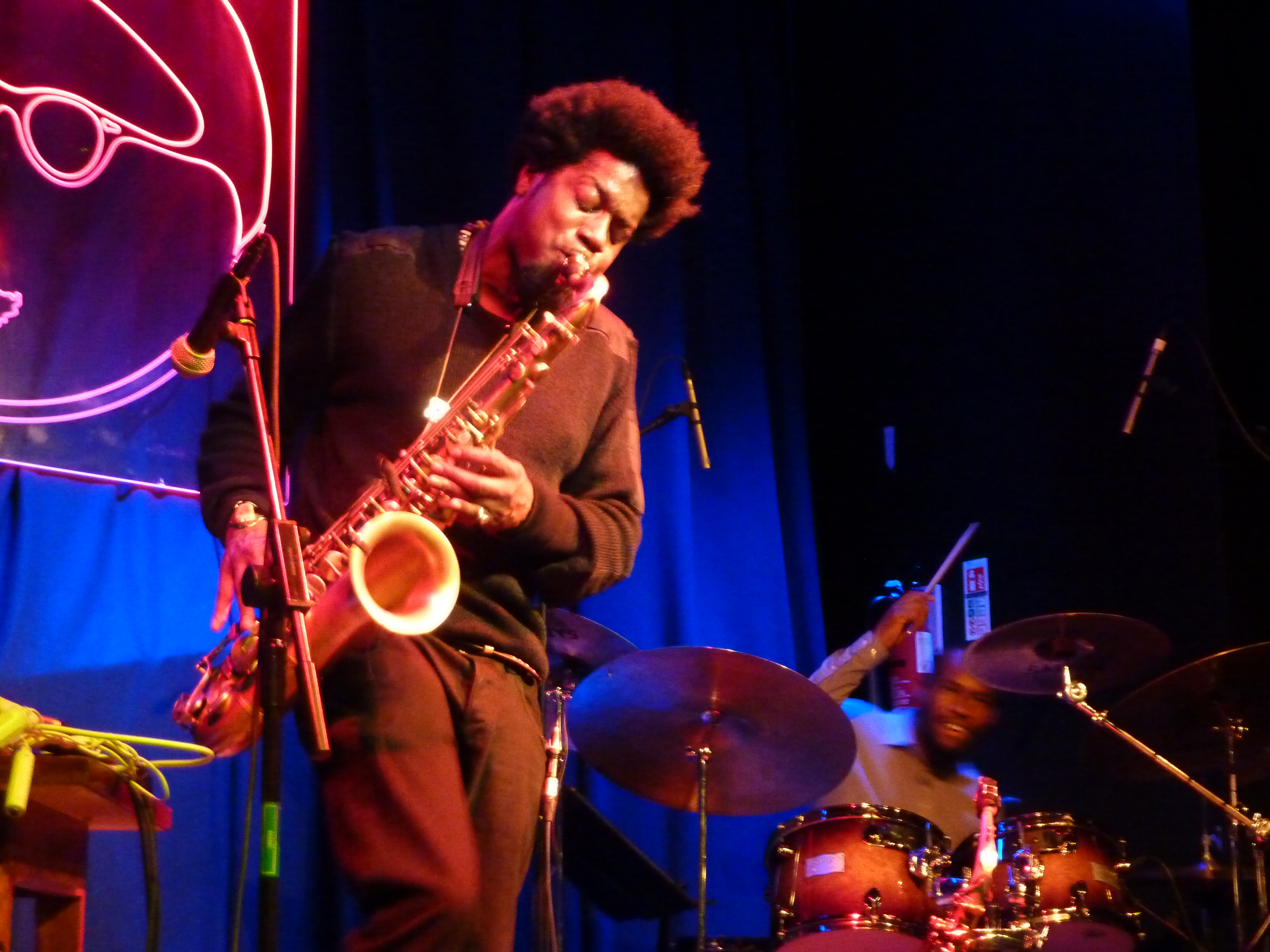
Kinch on stage at Band on the Wall in Manchester, 4 October 2012

Born in 1978 in London, England, to a Barbadian father, playwright Don Kinch, and British-Jamaican actress Yvette Harris, Soweto Kinch began playing saxophone at the age of nine after learning clarinet at Allfarthing Primary School, Wandsworth, south-west London. He then moved to Birmingham, where he attended West House Primary School in Edgbaston, beginning a long association with Britain's second city.

After meeting Wynton Marsalis four years later, he discovered and became passionate about jazz, first concentrating on piano and later in his teens switching to alto saxophone as his main instrument. He attended Bromsgrove School, Worcestershire, from the age of 13, completing his A-levels when he was 18. Early musical influences include the vocalist and percussionist Frank Holder. Kinch went on to study Modern History at Hertford College, Oxford University. He also benefited from participation in the programmes of Tomorrow's Warriors, the music education and artist development organisation co-founded in 1991 by Janine Irons and Gary Crosby, and played with Crosby's Jazz Jamaica All Stars collective.

In 2001, Kinch established the Soweto Kinch Trio with bassist Michael Olatuja and drummer Troy Miller and supported Courtney Pine at Ronnie Scott's Jazz Club and performed at the Royal Festival Hall and the Cheltenham International Jazz Festival.

In 2006, Kinch released his second album, A Life in the Day of B19: Tales of the Tower Block, the first instalment of a two-part concept album documenting the lives of three Birmingham men. The album includes narration by BBC newsreader Moira Stuart.

Kinch is also a member of the Pop Idol backing band the Big Blue.

Kinch has performed for Don't Flop Entertainment, where he has competed in rap battles and faced opponents Dotz, Shuffle T and Charron.

In an interview at Abbey Road Studios, Amy Winehouse mentioned that she would like to record a "more purist" jazz album, citing Kinch as a notable jazz musician with whom she would like to work.

== Stage work ==
In 2013, Kinch presented a staged performance of his concept album The Legend of Mike Smith at Birmingham Repertory Theatre in England. The performance was influenced by Divine Comedy and the seven deadly sins, telling the tale of Mike Smith, a young MC faced with a range of contemporary temptations. Kinch performed the work with Karl Rasheed Abel on bass and Shaney Forbes on drums. The subject allowed Kinch to explore a wide range of emotions in hip-hop and jazz form. He has stated that the trio format "allows [for] more harmonic freedom and space to deliver lyrics".

== Other work ==
In April 2016, Kinch became a presenter of the BBC Radio 3 programme Jazz Now and, in April 2024, 'Round Midnight.

Kinch curated the 2019 Koestler Arts exhibition, which showcases artworks created by prisoners and detainees in institutions, and is held at the Southbank Centre in London.

== Discography ==
- Conversations with the Unseen (Dune, 2003)
- A Life in the Day of B19: Tales of the Tower Block (Dune, 2006)
- War in a Rack (Soweto Kinch, 2009)
- The New Emancipation (Soweto Kinch, 2010)
- The Legend of Mike Smith (Soweto Kinch, 2013)
- Nonagram (Soweto Kinch, 2016)
- The Black Peril (Soweto Kinch, 2019)
