= Femi Temowo =

Nigerian-born British jazz musician (born 1976)

- Born: 15 September 1976 (age 49); Akure, Nigeria
- Origin: London, England
- Genres: Jazz, world, hip-hop, pop
- Occupations: Musician, songwriter
- Instruments: Guitar, vocals
- Years active: 1999–present
- Label: Femitone
- Website: femiguitar.com

Femi Temowo (born 15 September 1976) is a Nigerian-born British jazz guitarist, musical director, producer, and broadcaster.

== Career ==
Temowo was born in 1976 in Akure, Nigeria, and moved to London at the age of 10. He began playing guitar when he was 17 and was playing professionally by the age of 21.

Temowo also moonlights as a broadcaster, hosting Jazz Alive twice weekly on the Premier Gospel radio station.

Temowo released his debut solo album, Quiet Storm, in 2006 on his label, Femitone Music. He explains that while connected to his Nigerian roots, he was exploring his cultural background from the perspective of someone born in Nigeria but living as a British person in the UK.
