= Jazz Fest Sarajevo =

Annual music festival in Sarajevo, Bosnia

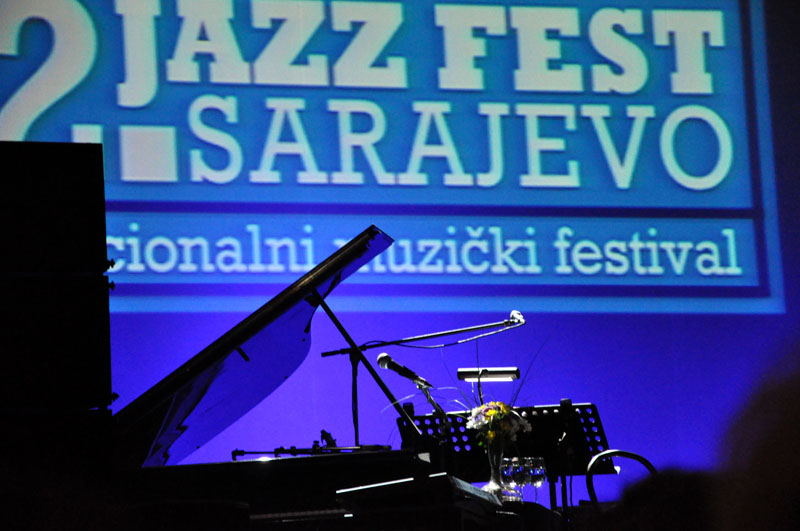
- Genre: jazz improvised music crossover world
- Dates: First week of November
- Locations: Sarajevo, Bosnia & Herzegovina
- Coordinates: 43°52′N 18°25′E
- Years active: 1997–present
- Website: www.jazzfest.ba

The Jazz Fest Sarajevo (Bosnian, Croatian and Serbian: Sarajevski džez festival / Сарајевски џез фестивал) is an international music festival held annually during the first week of November in Sarajevo and is the largest of its kind in Southeastern Europe.

== Background ==
Established in 1997, Jazz Fest Sarajevo is an annual celebration of contemporary music based on jazz-related and improvised music. The festival program features well-known jazz musicians from around the world, as well as new and upcoming artists in several venues around the city. In the past 20 years, it has earned a reputation of a trend setting international music festival in the Balkan region, with more than 600 artists performing at over 270 different concerts.

== Live releases recorded at Jazz Fest Sarajevo ==
- Live in Sarajevo by Norwegian saxophonist, tenor and composer Håkon Kornstad is a recording of his solo performance held at 18th Jazz Fest Sarajevo 2014, released by Jazzland Recordings in 2015.
- The composition "Adhān" by Arve Henriksen from his album Places of Worship, released by Runne Grammofon in 2013, is a field recording from his performance at 2nd Xenophonia in 2010.
- Live! by Bosnian vocalist Amira Medunjnanin was recorded in 2008 at 12th Jazz Fest Sarajevo and released by Gramofon the following year.
- Very Much Alive by Norwegian drummer Paolo Vinaccia, released by Jazzland Recordings in 2010, features a concert of the Terje Rypdal Trio held at 6th Jazz Fest Sarajevo 2002.

== Related events ==
Kid's Day is held traditionally on a Sunday, always the last festival day, when kids of age 3 to 12 have the chance to enjoy a concert with a repertoire of jazz standards rearranged especially for the occasion, followed by a workshop, "Meet the Instruments", where they prove, every year anew, that free chocolate and natural juices are the best fuel for uncontrolled music making.

Music Meeting Sarajevo is a program designed for young musicians and music students from the Western Balkans region, which is held within the festival's program. It offers a unique opportunity for participants to meet the festival's artists and showcase their talent on the Late Nite Stage program through jam sessions. Additionally, the program serves as a platform for future collaborations among young musicians who may have limited opportunities to participate in similar events due to the aftermath of the Balkan wars in the 1990s.

Xenophonia was initiated by Jazz Fest Sarajevo as a platform for collaboration between local and international artists, with the aim to enable a way for Bosnian and Herzegovenian musicians to position themselves on the international music scene.

== Personnel ==
Edin Zubčević – founder and artistic director

Djana Karavdić – head of office

Eric Bajramović – head of production

Mina Maglić – box office and assistance

== Past programs ==
List of Past Musical Groups
Year of Festival	Musical Groups	Musicians
2016	Bugge Messeltoft's New Conception of Jazz	Marthe Lea, Oddrun Lilja Jonsdottir, Sanskriti Shrestha, Siv Øyun Kjenstad, Bugge Wesseltoft
2016	Rob Mazurek São Paulo Underground	Rob Mazurek, Guilherme Granado, Mauricio Takara
2016	Nitai Hershkovits Solo	Nitai Hershkovits
2016	Tatran	Tamuz Dekel, Offir Benjaminov, Dan Mayo
2016	Marc Ducret Solo	Marc Ducret
2016	Samuel Blaser Trio	Samuel Blaser, Marc Ducret, Peter Bruun
2016	Inside Out	Markus Stockhausen, Florian Weber
2016	Taksim Trio	Hüsnü Şenlendirici, İsmail Tunçbilek, Aytaç Doğan
2016	Matija svira Arsena	Matija Dedić
2016	Masada - John Zorns Bagatelles Marathon Sarajevo	John Zorn, Dave Douglas, Greg Cohen, Joey Baron
2016	Julian Lage & Gyan Riley - John Zorns Bagatelles Marathon Sarajevo	Julian Lage, Gyan Riley
2016	Sylvie Courvoisier & Mark Feldman - John Zorns Bagatelles Marathon Sarajevo	Sylvie Courvoisier, Mark Feldman
2016	Trigger - John Zorns Bagatelles Marathon Sarajevo	Will Greene, Simon Hanes, Aaron Edgcomb
2016	Erik Friedlander & Jay Campbell - John Zorns Bagatelles Marathon Sarajevo	Erik Friedlander, Jay Campbell
2016	Uri Caine Trio - John Zorns Bagatelles Marathon Sarajevo	Uri Caine, Mark Helias, Clarence Penn
2016	Ikue Mori - John Zorns Bagatelles Marathon Sarajevo	Ikue Mori
2016	John Medeski Trio - John Zorns Bagatelles Marathon Sarajevo	John Medeski, David Fiuczynski, Calvin Weston
2016	Craig Taborn - John Zorns Bagatelles Marathon Sarajevo	Craig Taborn
2016	Asmodeus - John Zorns Bagatelles Marathon Sarajevo	Marc Ribot, Trevor Dunn, Kenny Grohowski, John Zorn
2016	Tijana Vignjević & Belma Alić	Tijana Vignjević, Belma Alić
2016	Miroslav Tadić & Merima Ključo	Miroslav Tadić, Merima Ključo
2016	Vincent Courtois-John Greaves-Mark Nauseef	Vincent Courtois, John Greaves, Mark Nauseef
2016	Eric Vloeimans' Oliver's Cinema	Eric Vloeimans, Jörg Brinkmann, Tuur Florizoone
2016	Bojan Z & Nils Wogram	Bojan Zulfikarpašić, Nils Wogram
2016	Julien Lourau & Bojan Z	Julien Lourau, Bojan Zulfikarpašić
2016	Django Bates’ humanCHain	Claire Hugenin, Django Bates, Dimitri Howald, Jeremias Keller, Nicolas Wolf, Nicola Habegger, Josephine Nagorsn, Gabriel Wenger, Michael Gilsenan, Loris Knüsel
2016	Terje Rypdal Group + Palle Mikkelborg	Terje Rypdal, Ståle Storløkken, Paolo Vinaccia, Palle Mikkelborg
2016	MONUMENTal ORKESTAR	Trajče Velkov, Kiril Kuzmanov, Dino Šukalo, Adis Sirbubalo, Edvin Hadžić, Amar Češljar
2015	Tigran Hamasyan “Mockroot”	Tigran Hamasyan, Sam Minaie, Arthur Hnatek
2015	Jason Moran Fats Waller Dance Party	Jason Moran, Lisa Harris, Donvonte McCoy, Tarus Mateen, Daru Jones
2015	Al Di Meola Elysium & More Unplugged	Al Di Meola, Peo Alfonsi, Peter Kaszas
2015	Arve Henriksen & Christian Fennesz	Arve Henriksen, Christian Fennesz
2015	Tomasz Stanko Band	Tomasz Stanko, Alexi Tuomarila, Eric Revis, Gerald Cleaver
2015	Vladimir Kostadinovic Quartet	Joris Roelofs, Marko Crnčec, Milan Nikolić, Vladimir Kostadinović
2015	Kurt Elling “Passion World”	Kurt Elling, John McLean, Stu Mindeman, Clark Sommers, Ulysses Owens
2015	Edgar Tones & The Su'sis with Big Band	Edgar Tones, Susanne Seiberl, Alexandra Grandl, Christiane Niederbacher, Markus Pechmann, Martin Harms, Alex Pohn, Dino Šukalo, Edvin Hadžic
2014	Gregory Porter	Gregory Porter, Yosuke Sato, Chip Crawford, Aaron James, Emanuel Harrold
2014	John McLaughlin & 4th Dimension	John McLaughlin, Gary Husband, Etienne Mbappé, Ranjit Barot
2014	Bill Frisell – Guitar in the Space Age!	Bill Frisell, Greg Leisz, Tony Scherr, Kenny Wollesen
2014	Braća Teofilović i Miroslav Tadić	Ratko Teofilović, Radiša Teofilović, Miroslav Tadić
2014	Dianne Reeves	Dianne Reeves, Romero Lubambo, Reginald Veal, Terreon Gully
2014	Håkon Kornstad – Dwell Time	Håkon Kornstad
2014	Avishai Cohen Trio	Avishai Cohen, Nitai Hershkovits, Daniel Dor
2014	Ibrahim Maalouf – Illusions	Ibrahim Maalouf, Francois Delporte, Frank Woeste, Antoine Guillemette, Stephane Galland, Youenn Le Cam, Yann Martin, Martin Saccardy
2013	ABRAHAM INC. feat. David Krakauer, Fred Wesley & SoCalled	David Krakauer, Fred Wesley, SoCalled, C-Rayz Walz, Freddie Hendrix, Phillip Whack, Sheryl Bailey, Allen Watsky, Nicki Parrott, Michael Sarin
2013	The John Scofield Überjam Band	John Scofield, Avi Bortnick, Andy Hess, Louis Cato
2013	Hamilton de Holanda	Hamilton de Holanda
2013	Jack DeJohnette Group feat. Don Byron	Jack DeJohnette, Don Byron, George Colligan, Jerome Harris
2013	David Gilmore & Art of Ascension Trio	David Gilmore, Matt Garrison, Gene Lake
2013	Eivind Aarset 4tet	Eivind Aarset, Audun Erlien, Erland Dahlen, Wetle Holte
2013	Marc Ducret Trio	Marc Ducret, Bruno Chevillon, Eric Echampard
2013	Halka	Božo Vrećo, Dino Šukalo, Adis Sirbubalo, Edvin Hadžić, Anes Beglerbegović
2012	Taksim Trio	Hüsnü Senlendirici, Ismail Tunçbilek, Aytaç Dogan
2012	Yuri Honing Wired Paradise	Yuri Honing, Frank Möbus, Stef van Es, Mark Haanstra, Joost Lijbaart
2012	The Bad Plus	Reid Anderson, Ethan Iverson, Dave King
2012	Badi Assad	Badi Assad
2012	Arkul Orchestra	Vladimir Mićković, Atilla Aksoj, Dino Šukalo, Adis Sirbubalo, Edvin Hadžic, Anes Beglerbegović
2012	Miles Smiles	Wallace Roney, Rick Margitza, Larry Coryell, Darryl Jones, Joey DeFrancesco, Omar Hakim
2012	Bojan Z	Bojan Zulfikarpašić
2012	Richard Galliano: La Strada Quintet	Richard Galliano, Flavio Boltro, Mauro Negri, Furio di Castri, Mattia Barbieri
2012	Erika Stucky: Suicidal Yodels	Erika Stucky
2012	ZVRN	Miron Rafajlović, Bojan Z, Paolo Vinaccia
2012	Dhafer Youssef: Abu Nawas Rhapsody	Dhafer Youssef, Kristjan Randalu, Chris Jennings, Chander Sardjoe, Simon Jouin
2012	Lê / Schiefel / Hadžić / Češljar	Michael Schiefel, Nguyen Lê, Edvin Hadžić, dr. Amar Češljar
2011	Richard Bona	Richard Bona
2011	The Rosenberg Trio	Stochelo Rosenberg, Nous'che Rosenberg, Nonnie Rosenberg
2011	Dave Holland & Pepe Habichuela Flamenco Quintet feat. Josemi Carmona	Dave Holland, Pepe Habichuela, Josemi Carmona, Bandolero, Juan Carmona
2011	Henderson / Berlin / Chambers Super Trio	Scott Henderson, Jeff Berlin, Dennis Chambers
2011	John Abercrombie Quartet	John Abercrombie, Mark Feldman, Thomas Morgan, Joey Baron
2011	Joseph & James Tawadros	Joseph Tawadros, James Tawadros
2011	Kudsi Erguner Trio	Kudsi Erguner, Renaud Garcia-Fons, Bruno Caillat
2011	Stian Westerhus	Stian Westerhus
2011	Schiefel / Hadžić / Yankoulov	Michael Schiefel, Edvin Hadžić, Stoyan Yankoulov
2011	Ralph Towner	Ralph Towner
2011	Cheikh Lô	Cheikh Lô, Wilfrid Zinssou, Baye Mahanta Diop, Washington Pito Rosas, Samba N'Dokh, Khadim M'Baye, Ndiaye Badou
2010	Burhan Öçal & The Trakya All Stars	Burhan Öçal, Ahmet Elbasan, Yasar Cakirlar, Saffet Tungul, Bulent Ustaoglu, Ismail Papis, Ahmet Demirkiran, Mehmet Celiksu, Umit Adakale
2010	Edin Bosnić	Edin Bosnić
2010	Mike Stern Band feat. Didier Lockwood	Mike Stern, Didier Lockwood, Alain Caron, Lionel Cordew
2010	Tigran Hamasyan	Tigran Hamasyan
2010	Dave Holland Quintet	Dave Holland, Chris Potter, Robin Eubanks, Steve Nelson, Nate Smith
2010	Joseph Tawadros	Joseph Tawadros
2010	John Scofield Trio	John Scofield, Steve Swallow, Bill Stewart
2010	Gerardo Núñez Flamenca Reunion	Carmen Cortés, Jesus Ruiz, Gerardo Núñez, Pablo Martin, Angel Sánchez Cepillo
2010	Mercan Dede Tribal Quartet	Mercan Dede – DJ, Aykut Sutoglu, Cafer Nazlibas, Onur Il
2009	Carlos Bica Azul	Frank Möbus, Carlos Bica, Jim Black
2009	Kurt Elling Sings the Music of Coltrane and Hartman	Kurt Elling, Ernie Watts, Laurence Hobgood, Harish Raghavan, Ulysess Owens
2009	Anouar Brahem	Anouar Brahem, Klaus Gesing, Björn Meyer, Khaled Yassine
2009	Arkul	Vladimir Mićković, Atilla Aksoj
2009	Trilok Gurtu Band	Phil Drummy, Roland Cabezas, Carlo Cantini, Johann Berby, Trilok Gurtu
2009	Damir Imamović	Damir Imamović
2009	Karim Ziad Ifrikya	Alain Debiossat, Vincent Mascart, Linley Marthe, Mahdi Ziouche, Hamid Mestari, Mehdi Askeur, Karim Ziad
2009	LTJ Bukem feat. MC Conrad	LTJ Bukem, MC Conrad
2009	Renaud Garcia-Fons & Linea Del Sur	Renaud Garcia-Fons, Antonio Ruiz, Pascal Rollando, David Venitucci
2009	Jojo Mayer Nerve	Takuya Nakamura, John Davis, Roli Mosimann, Jojo Mayer
2008	Dianne Reeves	Dianne Reeves, Peter Sprague, Peter Martin, Darryl Hall, Greg Hutchinson
2008	Damir Imamović Trio	Damir Imamović, Vanja Radoja, Edvin Hadžic
2008	Django Bates: Autumn Fires & Green Shots	Django Bates
2008	Brad Mehldau Trio	Brad Mehldau, Larry Grenadier, Jeff Ballard
2008	Amira Medunjanin	Amira Medunjanin, Dino Šukalo, Kim Burton, Edvin Hadžic, Amar Cešljar
2008	Misha Mengelberg	Misha Mengelberg
2008	Han Bennink	Han Bennink
2008	Manu Katche Playground	Mathias Eick, Tore Brunborg, Jason Rebello, Jarome Regard, Manu Katché
2008	Eric Vloeimans Gatecrash	Eric Vloeimans, Jeroen van Vliet, Gulli Gudmundsson, Jasper van Hulten
2008	Dave Douglas 3	Dave Douglas, Mark Feldman, Scott Colley
2008	Misha Mengelberg Quartet	Misha Mengelberg, Dave Douglas, Ernst Glerum, Han Bennink
2008	Omar Sosa Afreecanos Quartet	Omar Sosa, Mola Sylla, Childo Tomas, Julio Barreto
2008	Nicola Conte (DJ act)	Nicola Conte
2008	Jazzanova (DJ act)	Roskow Kretschmann, Dirk Rumpff
2008	Depart	Harry Sokal, Heiri Känzig, Jojo Mayer
2008	Susanna	Susanna Wallumrød, Helge Sten, Pål Hausken
2007	Aziza Mustafa Zadeh	Aziza Mustafa Zadeh
2007	Jacky Terrasson	Jacky Terrasson
2007	Mercan Dede Secret Tribe	Mercan Dede, Goksel Baktagir, Guven Celikkaya, Yunus Balcioglu, Onur Il, Tanya Evanson
2007	Bugge Wesseltoft	Bugge Wesseltoft
2007	Jazzland Community	Sidsel Endresen, Håkon Kornstad, Eivind Aarset, Bugge Wesseltoft, Audun Erlien, Wetle Holte
2007	Baba Zula feat. Alexander Hacke	Murat Ertel, Levent Akman, Cosar Kamçi, Ceren Ertel, Naho Totani, Aleksander Hacke
2007	Sidsel Endresen	Sidsel Endresen
2007	Del Ferro / Seferović / Terzić	Mike Del Ferro, Enes Seferović, Dejan Terzić
2007	Rabih Abou-Khalil Group	Rabih Abou-Khalil, Gavino Murgia, Luciano Biondini, Michel Godard, Jarrod Cagwin
2007	Mungolian Jet Set	Paul “Strangefruit” Nyhus, Knut Saevik, Bugge The Bald Bespectacled, Håkon Kornstad
2007	Marc Ribot	Marc Ribot
2007	Joshua Redman Trio	Joshua Redman, Omer Avital, Greg Hutchinson
2007	Maria João	Maria João, Andre Fernandes, Demian Cabaud, Alexandre Frazao
2006	Dejan Terzić: Underground	Chris Speed, Frank Möbus, Mark Helias, Dejan Terzić
2006	Nils Petter Molvær	Nils Petter Molvær
2006	Cristina Branco	Cristina Branco, Ricardo Dias, Bernardo Couto, Alexandre Silva, Fernando Maia
2006	Richard Bona Group	Richard Bona, Taylor Haskins, John Caban, Etienne Stadwijk, Samuel Torres, Ernesto Simpson
2006	Markus Stockhausen	Markus Stockhausen
2006	Bojan Z Xenophonia	Bojan Zulfikarpašić, Remi Vignolo, Ari Hoenig
2006	João Bosco / Gonzalo Rubalcaba Group	João Bosco, Gonzalo Rubalcaba, Nelson Faria, Ney Conceiçao, Kiko Freitas
2006	Yuri Honing Trio	Yuri Honing, Tony Overwater, Joost Lijbaart
2006	Trio 3	Oliver Lake, Reggie Workman, Andrew Cyrille
2006	Dhafer Youssef Group	Dhafer Youssef, Eivind Aarset, Audun Erlien, Rune Arnesen
2006	Dennis Rollins’ Badbone & Co.	Dennis Rollins, Jay Phelps, Johnny Heyes, Peter Cochrane, Alex Morgan, Vidal Juba, shortMAN
2006	Dhafer Youssef & Bojan Z	Dhafer Youssef, Bojan Zulfikarpašić
2006	FLY: Mark Turner, Larry Grenadier, Jeff Ballard	Mark Turner, Larry Grenadier, Jeff Ballard
2006	The Grande Mothers Re:invented	Napoleon Murphy Brock (with FZ 1974 – 1984), Roy Estrada (with FZ 1964 – 1984), Don Preston (with FZ 1966 – 1974), Miroslav Tadić, Christopher Garcia
2005	Charlie Haden's Liberation Music Orchestra feat. Carla Bley	Charlie Haden, Carla Bley, Chris Cheek, Tony Malaby, Loren Stillman, Michael Rodriguez, Seneca Black, Curtis Fowlkes, Ahnee Sharon Freeman, Joe Daley, Steve Cardenas, Matt Wilson
2005	Marimanga Group	Daniel Nösig, Jure Pukl, Adam Klemm, Armend Xhaferi, Enes Seferović, Wolfgang Reiner
2005	Jack De Johnette Quartet	Jerome Harris, Danilo Pérez, John Patitucci, Jack De Johnette
2005	Minority	Adam Klemm, Dino Šukalo, Enes Seferović, Amar Cešljar
2005	John Scofield Trio	John Scofield, Steve Swallow, Bill Stewart
2005	Matt Darriau Paradox Trio	Matt Darriau, Brad Shepik, Rufus Cappadocia, Seido Salifoski
2005	Tom Harrell Quintet	Tom Harrell, Jimmy Greene, Danny Grissett, Ugonna Okegwo, Johnathan Blake
2005	Jon Hassell & Maarifa Street	Jon Hassell, Peter Freeman, Rick Cox, Steve Shehan
2005	Arve Henriksen & Jan Bang	Arve Henriksen, Jan Bang
2005	Dafnis Prieto & Judith Sánchez-Ruíz	Dafnis Prieto, Judith Sánchez-Ruíz
2005	Snetberger / Andersen / Vinaccia	Ferenc Snétberger, Arild Andersen, Paolo Vinaccia
2005	Charming Hostess	Jewlia Eisenberg, Cynthia Taylor, Ganda Suthivarikom, AnMarie Rodgers
2005	Jazz Jamaica	Juliet Roberts, Zara Mcfarlane, Wesley L ucas, Abram Wilson, Harry Brown, Denys Baptiste, Soweto Kinch, Robin Banerjee, Alex Wilson, Gary Crosby, Satin Singh, Rod Youngs
2005	Han Bennink	Han Bennink
2005	Graham Haynes & Hardedge	Graham Haynes, Hardedge
2005	Magic Malik Orchestra	Malik Mezzadri, Denis Guivarc'h, Or Solomon, Sarah Murcia, Maxime Zampieri
2005	Daniel Karlsson Quintet	Daniel Karlsson, Peter Asplund, Per Texas Johansson, Christian Spering, Magnus Gran
2004	Biréli Lagrène	Biréli Lagrène, Paul Winterstein, Diego Imbert, Franck Wolf
2004	Dusko Goykovich Quartet	Dusko Goykovich, Joe Kienemann, Gary Todd, Harald Rüschenbaum
2004	Joachim Kühn Trio	Joachim Kühn, Jean Paul Celea, Wolfgang Reisinger
2004	Ravi Coltrane Group	Ravi Coltrane, Luis Perdomo, Drew Gress, EJ Strickland
2004	Al Foster Quartet	Eli Degibri, Kevin Hays, Doug Weiss, Al Foster
2004	Carlos Bica & Ana Brandao: DIZ	Ana Brandão, Carlos Bica, João Paulo, Katharina Gramss, Valentin Gregor
2004	Django Bates Human Chain + J. Lindstrand	Josefine Lindstrand, Julian Siegel, Django Bates, Laurence Cottle, Gary Husband
2004	Victor Bailey Group	Victor Bailey, Peter Horvath, Bennie Maupin, Scott Peaker
2004	Roscoe Mitchell Trio	Roscoe Mitchell, Harrison Bankhead, Tani Tabbal
2004	Wadada Leo Smith & Ikue Mori	Wadada Leo Smith, Ikue Mori
2004	Steve Coleman & Five Elements + guests	Steve Coleman, Jonathan Finlayson, Yunior Terry, Dafnis Prieto, Jenn Shyu
2004	Muriel Zoe	Muriel Zoe, Matthias Pogoda, Johannes Huth, Michael Verhovec, Michael Leuschner
2004	Distortion Trio	Matthew Bourne, Chris Sharkey, Dave Black
2004	Susie Ibarra Trio	Jennifer Choi, Craig Taborn, Susie Ibarra
2004	Kudsi Ergüner: Islam Blues	Halil Necipoglu, Kudsi Ergüner, Bijane Chemirani
2004	Jarek Smietana Quartet	Jarek Smietana, Piotr Wylezol, Steve Logan, Adam Czerwinski
2003	Denys Baptiste – Let Freedom Ring!	Denys Baptiste, Nathaniel Facey, Abram Wilson, Trevor Mires, Omar Puente, Jenny Adejayan, Andrew McCormack, Gary Crosby, Satin Singh, Rod Youngs, Jason Yarde
2003	Minority	Dino Šukalo, Enes Seferović, Amar Cešljar, Marko Ðordević
2003	Bojan Z “Transpacifik” Trio	Bojan Zulfikarpašić, Remy Vignolo, Ben Perowsky
2003	E.S.T. – Esbjörn Svensson Trio	Esbjörn Svensson, Dan Berglund, Magnus Öström
2003	Soweto Kinch 4tet with Abram Wilson	Soweto Kinch, Emmanuel Temowo, Michael Olatuja, Troy Miller, feat. Abram Wilson
2003	Combinate	Ante Gelo, Kristijan Terzić, Zvjezdan Marijanović, Marko Matošević
2003	Dhafer Youssef & Digital Prophecy	Dhafer Youssef, Eivind Aarset, Dieter Ilg, Rune Arnesen
2003	Vasilić Nenad Balkan Band + Martin Lubenov	Nenad Vasilić, Georg Gratzer, Armend Xhaferi, Dušan Novakov, feat. Martin Lubenov
2003	Nils Wogram & Root 70	Nils Wogram, Hayden Chishom, Matt Penman, Jochen Rückert
2003	Ante Gelo Trio	Ante Gelo, Nenad Vasilić, Dušan Novakov
2003	Juliet Roberts	Juliet Roberts, Gary Crosby, Andrew McCormack, Rod Youngs, feat. Denys Baptiste
2003	Massimo: Johnny Hartman Songbook	Massimo Savić, Matija Dedić, Enes Seferović, Dejan Terzić
2003	Carlo Actis Dato	Carlo Actis Dato
2003	Muthspiel & Muthspiel	Christian Muthspiel, Wolfgang Muthspiel
2003	Dejan Terzić European Assembly feat. Antonio Farao	Antonio Farao, Salvatore La Rocca, Jens Winther, Tony Lakatos, Dejan Terzić
2003	Nguyên Lê “The Hendrix Project”	Nguyên Lê, Cathy Renoir, Michel Alibo, Dominique Borker, Tino di Geraldo
2003	Gerardo Nuñez Group + Rafael + Carmen Cortés	Carmen Cortés, Rafael de Utrera, Gerardo Nuñez, Pablo Martin, Cepillo
2003	Combinate	Ante Gelo, Kristijan Terzić, Zvjezdan Marijanović, Marko Matošević
2003	Xhaferi & Seferović	Armend Xhaferi, Enes Seferović
2003	Han Bennink	Han Bennink
2003	Anouar Brahem & Barbaros Erköse	Anouar Brahem, Barbaros Erköse
2003	Special Edition	Armend Xhaferi, Ante Gelo, Matija Dedić, Enes Seferović, Dejan Terzić, Amar Cešljar
2002	Joe Zawinul Syndicate (70th Birthday Tour)	Joe Zawinul, Sabine Kabongo, Amit Chatterjee, Etienne M'bappe, Manolo Badrena, Paco Sery
2002	Der Rote Bereich	Frank Möbus, Rudi Mahal, John Schröder
2002	Dennis Rollins' Badbone & Co.	Dennis Rollins, John Heyes, Geoffrey Benet McLean, Peter Martin, Joshua McKenzie
2002	Stefano Di Battista Quartet	Stefano di Battista, Eric Legnini, Rosario Bonnacorso, Andre Ceccarelli
2002	Lonnie Plaxico Group	Lonnie Plaxico, Jeremy Pelt, Marcus Strickland, Helen Snug, Lionel Cordew
2002	Darko Poljak Quartet	Darko Poljak, Matija Dedić, Dinko Šimunovic, Dušan Novakov
2002	Tamara Obrovac Transhistria Ensemble	Tamara Obrovac, Uroš Rakovec, Simone Zanchini, Žiga Golob, Kruno Levačić
2002	Maria Joao & Mario Laginha Mumadji Quartet	Maria Joao, Mario Laginha, Yuri Sousa, Helge Norbakken
2002	The Graz Veterans	Marko Ðordevic, Matija Dedić, Predrag Revišin, Dušan Novakov
2002	Kenny Wheeler & John Taylor	Kenny Wheeler, John Taylor
2002	Terje Rypdal Group	Terje Rypdal, Staale Storlokken, Paolo Vinaccia
2002	Renaud Garcia-Fons Navigatore	Renaud Garcia-Fons, Bruno Sansalone, Antonio Ruiz, Jorge Trasante
2002	Armend Xhaferi Trio	Armend Xhaferi, Enes Seferović, Dušan Novakov
2001	Vlatko Stefanovski / Miroslav Tadić	Vlatko Stefanovski, Miroslav Tadić
2001	Harry Sokal Roots Ahead Trio	Harry Sokal, Georg Breinschmid, Mario Gonzi
2001	Arild Andersen Trio Feat. Kirsten Braten Berg	Kirsten Bråten Berg, Arild Andersen, Tore Brunborg, Patrice Heral
2001	Vasilić Nenad Balkan Band	Vasilić Nenad, Klemens Pliem, Stefan Heckel, Dušan Novakov
2001	Triocolor	Jens Thomas, Stefan Weeke, Björn Lücker
2001	Wolfgang Puschnig Aspects Quartet	Wolfgang Puschnig, Herbert Joos, Achim Tang, Emil Kristof
2001	Bojan Zulfikarpašic & Anna Lauvergnac	Bojan Zulfikarpašić, Anna Lauvergnac
2001	Trio Aldo Romano / Louis Sclavis / Henry Texier	Aldo Romano, Louis Sclavis, Henry Texier
2001	Paolo Fresu Quintet	Tino Tracanna, Roberto Cipelli, Attilio Zanchi, Ettore Fioravanti
2001	Dave Holland & Chris Potter	Dave Holland, Chris Potter
2001	Bojan Zulfikarpašić / Julien Lourau / Karim Ziad	Bojan Zulfikarpašić, Julien Lourau, Karim Ziad
2001	Erik Truffaz Quartet feat. Nya	Erik Truffaz, Nya, Patrik Müller, Patrice Moret, Christophe Calpini, Frederic Hashadourian
2000	Marimanga Trio	Armend Xhaferi, Enes Seferović, Bajram Istrefi
2000	Hans Mathisen New Quartet	Hans Mathisen, Olga Konkova, Per Mathisen, Per Oddvar Johansen
2000	Boilers Quartet	Davor Križic, Matija Dedić, Mladen Baraković, Krunoslav Levačić
2000	Edin Bosnić Trio & Horns Four	Edin Bosnić, Dinko Šimunovic, Amar Cešljar, Džemal Cakić, Sanel Kabiljagić, Marin Gradac, Darko Poljak
2000	Vienna Art Orchestra, cond. Mathias Rüegg	Anna Lauvergnac, Thorsten Benkenstein, Matthieu Michel, Bumi Fian, Thomas Gensch, Robert Bachner, Christian Muthspiel, Ed Partyka, Klaus Dickbauer, Florian Bramböck, Harry Sokal, Andy Scherrer, Hank Gradischnig, Georg Breinschmid, Mario Gonzi, Robert Riegler, Thomas Lang, Martin Koller, Mathias Rüegg
2000	Markus Stockhausen / Arild Andersen / Patrice Heral	Markus Stockhausen, Arild Andersen, Patrice Heral
2000	Richard Galliano Trio	Richard Galliano, Jean-Marie Ecay, Jean-Philippe Viret
2000	Irene Schweizer	Irene Schweizer
2000	Karl Razter Group	Karl Ratzer, Oliver Kent, Herfried Knapp, Joris Dudli, Ricardo Mateus
1999	Django Bates: Quiet Nights	Django Bates, Josefine Cronholm, Iain Ballamy, Michael Mondesir, Martin France
1999	J-Life	Julie Dexter, Jason Yarde, Robert Mitchell, Darren Taylor, Daniel Crosby
1999	Jeanne D	Jeanne D
1999	Cubismo	Hrvoje "El Cacique" Rupčić, Ricardo Luque, Darvor Krišic, Neno Grahovac, Mario Igrec, Zlatan "Aurelio" Došlić, Krešimir Tomec, Zdravko Tabain, Mladen "Electrico" Ilić
1999	Sephardic Tinge	Anthony Coleman, Ben Street, Michael Sarin
1999	The Zawinul Syndicate	Joe Zawinul, Victor Bailey, Gary Poulson, Manolo Bardena
1999	Bodan Arsovski & Ezgija Orchestra	Bodan Arsovski, Sabit Tahiri, Igor Atanasoski, Goran Bugarinovski, Džijan Emin, Goce Stefkovski
1999	Markus Stockhausen and Dhafer Youssef	Markus Stockhausen, Dhafer Youssef
1999	Bojan Zulfikarpašić	Bojan Zulfikarpašić
1999	Gypsy Swing Project	Hisao Fukushima, Mark Chung, Yoshiaki Sato, Yasuji Ishii, Kei Masuda
1998	B. P. All Stars Band	Boško Petrović, Primož Grašić, Neven Frangeš, Mario Mavrin, Alvin Queen
1998	Happy End	Krešimir Vlašic, Josip Jurić, Tomislav Karača, Sinan Alimanović, Naim Grebo, Vladimir Borovčanin
1998	Jiri Stivin & Ali Haurand	Jiri Stivin, Ali Haurand
1998	Vladan Dobricki Trio	Vladan Dobricki, Kliment Angelovski, Dino Milosavljević
1998	Seth	Vladan Dobricki, Vasko Bojadjiski, Kliment Angelovski, Ðoko Maksimovski, Dino Milosavljević
1998	Vlatko Stefanovski Trio	Vlatko Stefanovski, Ðoko Maksimovski, Mihail Parusev
1998	Yazzya & Special Guest	Information Unknown
1998	Berndt Luef & Jazzett Forum Graz	Berndt Luef, Thomas Rottleuthner, Axel Mayer, Klemens Pliem, Thorsten Zimmermann
1997	Happy End	Information Unknown
1997	No Srklet Band	Information Unknown
1997	Fabrizzio & His Friends	Information Unknown
1997	Low Brass	Information Unknown
1997	Eddie Parker Trio	Information Unknown
1997	Unfinished Business	Information Unknown
1997	Boilers Quartet	Information Unknown
1997	Fun-Da-Mental	Information Unknown
