= Tony Platt =

British record producer

- Origin: United Kingdom
- Occupations: Audio engineering, record producer
- Website: platinumtones.com

Tony Platt is an English sound engineer and record producer, best known for his work with a diverse mix of artists, including, AC/DC, Cheap Trick, Bob Marley, Shy, Buddy Guy, Foreigner, The Mighty Mighty Bosstones, Sparks, Jazz Jamaica All Stars, Lillian Axe, The Boomtown Rats, Motörhead and Testament.

== Career ==
Platt's career started at Trident Studios in London and eventually became an engineer at Island Studios. Working his way from assistant engineer on sessions with the likes of Traffic, the Who, the Rolling Stones, Led Zeppelin he started to engineer on sessions with Free, Sutherland Brothers, Paul McCartney, Jess Roden, Sharks, and Mott the Hoople. He went on to engineer the Catch a Fire and Burnin' albums for Jamaican artist Bob Marley which, it is claimed, would launch reggae music into the mainstream. This association led him to complete "Funky Kingston" for Toots & the Maytals and work with several other notable reggae artists such as ZapPow, Lorna Bennet, Harry J's All Stars, Aswad and the Cimarons.

Island provided Platt with experience working on the numerous orchestral, commercial and pop sessions that came through the studio. After working with the various spin off projects from the recently disbanded Free – Sharks, Toby, Peace and Kossoff, Kirke, Tetsu and Rabbit and for Muff Winwood on the debut Sparks album Kimono My House he left Island and turned freelance.

Having recorded demos for Thin Lizzy and the Stranglers, he became an engineer for Mutt Lange. With Lange he worked on the AC/DC albums Highway to Hell and Back in Black, and the Foreigner album 4. On his own he engineered and produced the work of artists such as Krokus, Motörhead, Gary Moore, Cheap Trick, the Cult, Testament and Marillion. He also recorded two albums for Buddy Guy – the Grammy winning Damn Right I've Got the Blues and the follow-up Feels Like Rain. Platt also produced Rough Trade's very first label release, the 7" single Paris Maquis by French band Metal Urbain.

Platt worked on an album with Soweto Kinch, and the recording of Abram Wilson's Jerwood commissioned piece Ride - The Ferris Wheel to the Modern Delta.

He has had close involvement with Kinch and Wilson's label, Dune Records, working with Jazz Jamaica All Stars, Juliet Roberts, and Denys Baptiste's Let Freedom Ring which was voted Jazz Critics Record of the Year. Other productions have included Clare Teal's Road Less Traveled album for Candid Records, Don't Talk – her first for Sony Jazz which entered at 19 on the album chart and the debut album Jazz Warrior for New Orleans trumpeter Abram Wilson which was also nominated for the Mercury and MOBO prizes.

Projects completed were another Dune Records album with Jazz Jamaica All Stars featuring Motown Hits, the mixing of an album for jazz pianist Andrew McCormack and an installation piece for the Tower of London with Jason Yarde.

Platt completed an album with jazz trio The Bad Plus in 2007, and jazz pianist Abdullah Ibrahim in 2019.

He has also collaborated with UK band Second Person on their second studio release and he continues further development work with a number of artists, including Roland Perrin, Ana Silvera and Daniel Ward Murphy and 28 Costumes.
