= Camilla George =

British jazz saxophonist (born 1988)

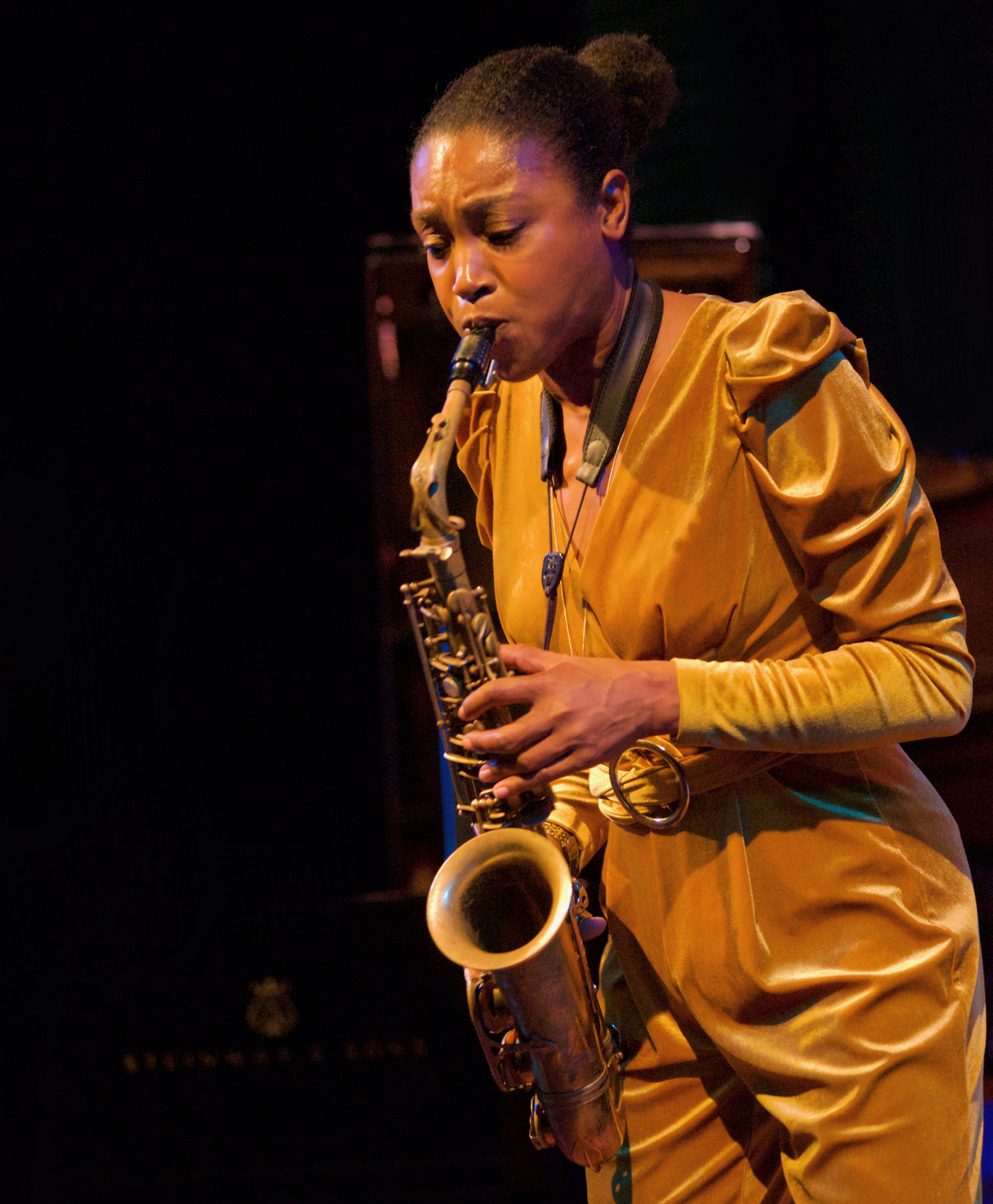

Background information
- Born: 1988 (age 37–38); Eket, Nigeria
- Education: Tomorrow's Warriors; Trinity College of Music
- Genres: Jazz, Afrofuturism
- Occupations: Musician, bandleader, composer
- Instrument: Alto saxophone
- Website: www.camillageorge.com

Camilla George (born 1988) is a Nigerian-born British jazz saxophonist, composer and band leader, who has lived in West London, England, since childhood. Her music blends Afrofuturism and jazz, fusing African and Western styles, with a strong connection to her Nigerian identity.

An associate over the years of such music initiatives as Tomorrow's Warriors, Nu Civilisation Orchestra and Jazz Jamaica, she has been a frequent performer at prominent venues in the UK such as Ronnie Scott's Jazz Club and the Queen Elizabeth Hall at London's Southbank Centre, as well as internationally. George has played in collaboration with many notable musicians in the course of her career, among them Nubya Garcia, Shabaka Hutchings, Tom Harrison, Ernest Ranglin, Courtney Pine, Zara McFarlane, Moses Boyd, China Moses, Tony Kofi, Jason Yarde and Soweto Kinch, and others, in addition to forming her own group, the CGQ (Camilla George Quartet).

== Biography ==
Camilla George was born in 1988 in Eket, Nigeria, "the only child of a British-Nigerian mother, an occupational psychologist, and a Grenadian father, a tailor who worked on Savile Row", and when she was about three years old, the family relocated to England.

Thanks to her parents' record collection, she grew up listening to a wide range of music, including highlife, Afrobeat and jazz, by such musicians as Fela Kuti, Jackie McLean and Charlie Parker. Speaking to Dave Gelly in a 2017 interview for the National Jazz Archive, George said she began to gravitate towards jazz because of regular visits with her mother to the Ealing Jazz Festival and in particular because of exposure to the "huge vinyl collection" of her father – "that's where I started to learn about who was who in jazz. He loved Sidney Bechet, Stanley Turrentine, Sonny Stitt and I kind of got to love jazz through him I think." The first album she bought herself was 1957's Sonny Side Up, featuring Dizzy Gillespie, Sonny Stitt, Sonny Rollins.

George began playing the saxophone at the age of 11, when she was a pupil at Bishop Ramsey School in Ruislip, after winning a competition that offered free music tuition and an instrument, and not long afterwards met Gary Crosby and Janine Irons, founders of jazz music education and artist development organisation Tomorrow's Warriors. As George recalls:

"My mum had taken me to a few gigs. I grew up in west London and we'd been to the Ealing Jazz Festival. Then mum saw that Jazz Jamaica was playing at Harrow Arts Centre. Afterwards we met Gary [Crosby] and Janine [Irons] and mum said I'd just got a sax. And they were so nice to me. They said, you need to come to the Warriors project, we run workshops, they're free. And I was speaking to Denys Baptiste and Jason Yarde, who were in the lineup that night. It was a great moment."

Working since 2004 with Tomorrow's Warriors, in 2009 she joined Crosby's Jazz Jamaica, the group being nominated in 2013 for a MOBO Award for Jazz Performance. In 2014, she joined the "Venus Warriors", an all-female group put together by Courtney Pine, and also in that year she formed her own group the CGQ (Camilla George Quartet).

Meanwhile, George also attended Trinity College of Music, where she studied with Jean Toussaint, Julian Siegel and Martin Speake, winning the Archer Scholarship for outstanding performance in 2011, and earning a master's degree in Jazz Performance in 2012.

The fusion of African, Caribbean and American influences is apparent in her music, as in her 2017 debut album Isang. Her follow-up album The People Could Fly was released in 2018, and is inspired by a book based on African folktales and the stories of enslaved people. Her third studio album, Ibio-Ibio, enabled by a PRS Foundation Momentum award, celebrates her tribe, the Ibibio people of southern Nigeria, and their original culture and religion.

George was nominated for an Urban Music Award for Best Jazz artist in 2017 and 2018, and was nominated as Best Instrumentalist in 2019 in the Jazz FM Awards, and was also a finalist in the DC Jazz Prix in 2021.

Since February 2024, George has been serving as a trustee of Tomorrow's Warriors.

== Discography ==
- 2017: Isang (Ubuntu Music – UBU0004)
- 2018: The People Could Fly (Ubuntu Music – UBU0015)
- 2022: Ibio-Ibio (Ever Records/!K7 Music)

== Awards ==
- PRS Foundation Momentum Award
