= Janine Irons =

British music educator

Janine Irons OBE FRSA
- Born: Janine Mireille Irons; Harrow, London, England
- Occupations: Music educator, artist manager and producer
- Known for: Chief executive of Tomorrow's Warriors
- Partner: Gary Crosby
- Awards: Services to Jazz Award at 2023 Parliamentary Jazz Awards

Janine Mireille Irons is a British music educator, artist manager and producer, who in 1991 co-founded with her partner Gary Crosby the music education and professional development organisation Tomorrow's Warriors, of which she is Chief Executive. In 1997, she and Crosby also initiated the Dune Records label, with a focus on Black British jazz musicians and musicians from Tomorrow's Warriors. Irons has also worked as a photographer and musician.

In 2023, Irons received the Services to Jazz Award at the Parliamentary Jazz Awards, and she was also honoured as an OBE in the Birthday Honours for services to the music industry. and also

== Biography ==
Born in Harrow, London, England, Irons studied classical piano "with a teacher who was rumoured to have worked with [André] Previn". As a young teenager, she sang in a funk band and at 16 was offered a contract as a vocalist; instead, however, she decided to pursue a career in The City. Finding this work "well-paid but boring", she enrolled on a photography course at the City and Guilds of London Institute. It was while covering a jazz performance as a freelance photographer that she met her future partner, bass player Gary Crosby, and after helping with his band she went on to manage artists, as well as becoming involved with recording and releasing records.

=== Tomorrow's Warriors ===
Irons and Crosby founded in 1991 the jazz music education and artist development organisation Tomorrow's Warriors, of which Irons is managing director/CEO, and in 1997 began Dune Records, which soon developed into an award-winning label, with Irons as managing director. She has recalled initially having to do "everything apart from play the music! I did the photography, the liner notes, the artwork, the press/PR, the distribution… everything! However, with our third release, Denys Baptiste's Be Where You Are (1999), we decided to engage professional designers to ease the pressures on me. Again, this album received great critical acclaim and, to our utter amazement, was nominated for the Mercury Music Prize, the most prestigious music prize in the UK which looks for the best releases of British music regardless of genre." In addition to Baptiste, other notable acts associated with Dune include Nu Troop, J-Life, Jazz Jamaica, Soweto Kinch and Abram Wilson.

With 2026 marking the 35th anniversary of the founding of Tomorrow's Warriors, Irons recalled the vision that she and Crosby shared "for a better future for young, nascent talent from diverse and often challenging backgrounds – jazz musicians at the very dawn of their artistic journeys, when they are most vulnerable to being marginalised, undervalued or ignored", restating their mission "to champion the next generation of jazz musicians and creative leaders, to build a richly diverse music industry from the ground up, and to ensure that every young person who walks through our doors has the space, support and belief to discover their magic and thrive."

== Awards and recognition ==
Irons was nominated for a European Federation of Black Women Business Owners award in 1999. In 2006, she completed the Clore Leadership Programme Short Course on Cultural Leadership and, also in that year, was appointed Member of the Order of the British Empire (MBE) in the 2006 Birthday Honours for services to the music industry. She is also a Fellow of the Royal Society of Arts (FRSA).

In 2019, she was recognised in the Alternative Power 100 Music List, which was established as a response to Billboard magazine's Power 100 List with the aim to challenge conventional music industry standards by SheSaid.So, a global network of women in the music industry.

Irons was an honoree on the Roll of Honour for the 2020 Music Week Women In Music Awards, held in association with AIM and UK Music.

On 23 November 2020, she was featured by Robert Elms as a "Listed Londoner" on his BBC Radio London programme.

She was appointed Officer of the Order of the British Empire (OBE) in the 2023 Birthday Honours, for services to the music industry.

At the 2023 Parliamentary Jazz Awards, Irons received the Services to Jazz Award (with the award for "Jazz Newcomer of the Year" going to Tomorrow's Warriors alumnus Sultan Stevenson).
