= Neil Yates =

British jazz and folk musician (born 1970)

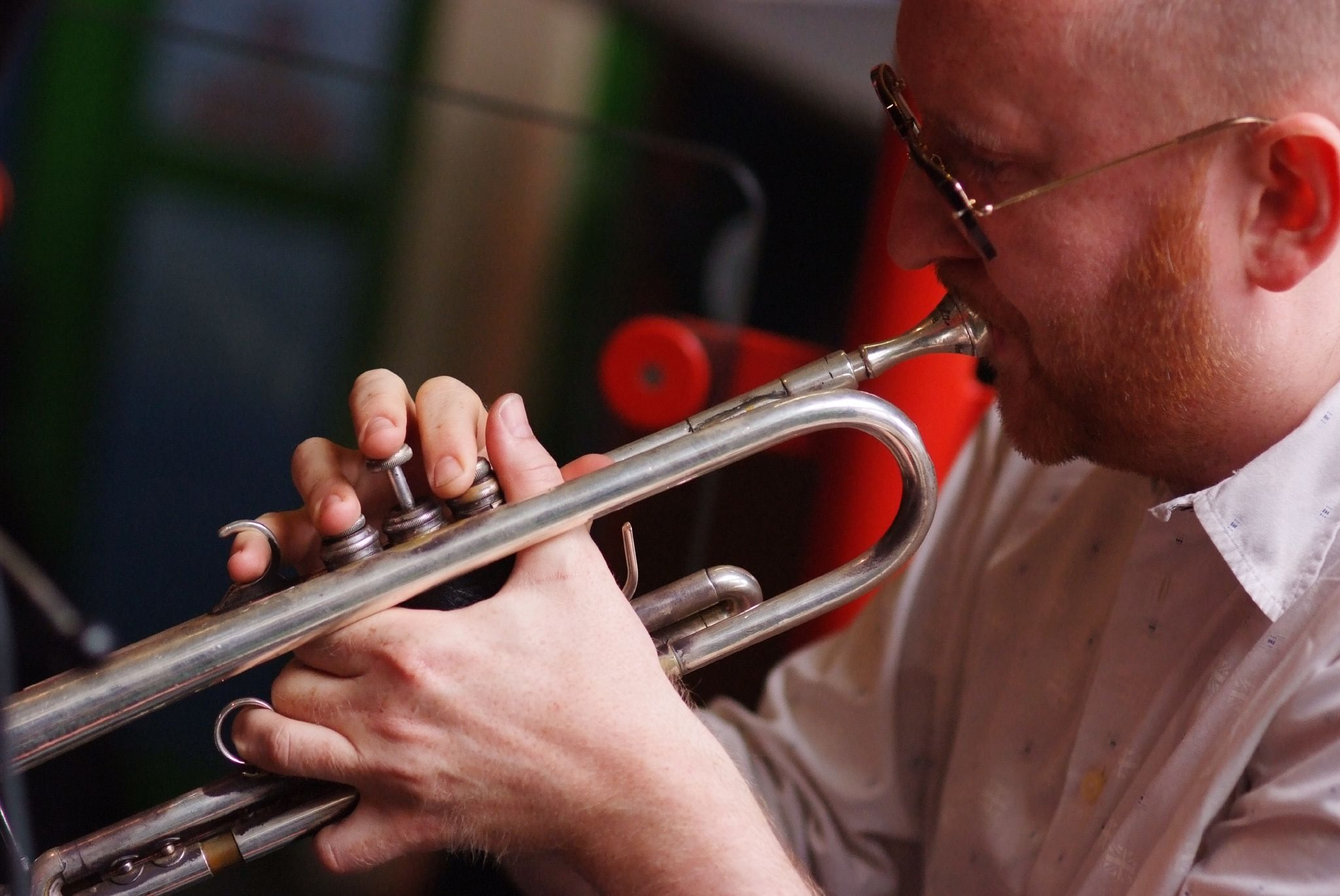

Background information
- Born: 1970 (age 55–56); Stockport, Cheshire, England
- Genres: Jazz, folk
- Occupations: Performer, bandleader, composer, educator
- Instruments: Trumpet, tin whistle
- Years active: 1998–present
- Member of: New Origins
- Website: neilyates.co.uk

Neil Yates (born 1970 in Stockport, Cheshire, England) is a British jazz and folk musician.

== Biography ==
Yates studied music at Salford University before moving to London to study jazz at the Guildhall School of Music and Drama. He lived and worked in London for eight years, playing jazz with National Youth Jazz Orchestra, Peter King, Don Weller, Denys Baptiste, Jazz Jamaica All Stars, Alex Wilson, Clark Tracey, Gary Crosby's Nu Troop and the Caroline Taylor Quintet. During this time Yates also worked as session musician for Brand New Heavies, Supergrass, Black Grape, Lighthouse Family, Alison Moyet, Will Young, Raw Stylus, Suggs, Matt Bianco, Robbie Williams and Rhian Benson.

Yates then chose to spend a year living in a small caravan travelling round the folk music festivals of Britain and Ireland, learning and playing traditional Celtic music, before moving out to the coast of North Wales coast to play and write, and to study Celtic music. During this time he was playing and recording with folk musicians such as Michael McGoldrick, Kate Rusby, John McCusker, Karen Matheson (Capercaille) and John Joe Kelly. Yates was a featured solo artist in Belfast Open House Festival's "Trad with a Difference" evening as the only person ever to successfully interpret Irish traditional styles onto the trumpet.

Yates later formed the band e2K, a group influenced by jazz, English folksong, Irish melodies and rhythms from Ghana (West Africa). It was with this group that Yates secured a two-album deal with the London-based independent record label Topic Records.

Yates was a featured soloist in the Manchester Jazz Festival 2005 special commission alongside pianist John Taylor. It was at this festival that Yates debuted his own project "New Origins". The band later recorded in March the same year and released their album Neil Yates: New Origins, on Yates' own label, Carnyx Records.

As a composer Yates was commissioned to write "Sketches of a Northern Town" for Manchester Jazz Festival 2006, also performed at the Cheltenham Jazz Festival 2007 and later to write "Surroundings" – an antiphonal suite for jazz orchestra that premiered at Manchester Jazz Festival 2010.

In November 2011 British jazz label Edition Records released Yates' second album, Neil Yates: Five Countries.

Yates currently lectures in jazz trumpet and improvisation at Leeds College of Music, where he directs the LCoM Big Band, and at Salford University. He formerly held similar posts at Royal Northern College of Music and the Birmingham Conservatoire.

== Discography ==
=== As a leader ===
- 2011: "Five Countries" — Neil Yates (Edition Records)
- 2005: New Origins — Neil Yates (Carnyx Records)

=== Other appearances ===
- 2006: Manchester Road — John Thorne's Oedipus Complex (Surface to Air)
- 2006: Echo Architect — Stuart McCallum (CD Baby)
- 2005: The Other Side of Notting Hill — Cameron Pierre (Candid Productions)
- 2005: Llanita — Almeida Girl & Descaga (Latin Jungle)
- 2005: The Girl Who Couldn't Fly — Kate Rusby (Pure Records)
- 2005: Wired — Michael McGoldrick (Vertical Records)
- 2004: Star Mountain Sessions — Improvokation (Forged Records)
- 2004: Globe Trekker – Earth Journeys, Vol. 2 — Soundtrack (Pilot Productions)
- 2004: Goodnight Ginger — John McCusker (Pure Records)
- 2004: If Not Now — e2K (Topic Records)
- 2003: My Thrawn Glory — James Grant (Vertical Records)
- 2003: Heartlands — Kate Rusby (Pure Records)
- 2003: Underneath the Stars — Kate Rusby (Pure Records)
- 2003: Merry Christmas and a Happy New Year — National Youth Jazz Orchestra (NYJO)
- 2003: Friday's Child — Will Young (BMG)
- 2002: Quest — Chris While & Julie Matthews (Fat Cat Records)
- 2002: Migrations — Gary Crosby's Nu Troop (Dune)
- 2002: 10 — Kate Rusby (Pure Records)
- 2002: Time To Fall — Karen Matheson (Vertical Records)
- 2002: Echoes — Matt Bianco (Victor)
- 2002: Slightly Askew — Chris Bowden (Ninja Tune)
- 2002: Sound Engine — Joe Broughton (Salenella Records)
- 2001: Shift — e2K (Topic Records)
- 2001: Curse of the Mekons — The Mekons (Collectors Choice)
- 2000: Fused — Michael McGoldrick (Vertical Records)
- 2000: We Love the City — Hefner (Pure Records)
- 2000: Film — Jessica Lauren (Melt)
- 2000: On top — Akimbo (Acid Jazz)
- 2000: Good Fruit — Hefner (Pure Records)
- 1999: For the Moment — Caroline Taylor Quintet (CMT)
- 1999: The Fidelity Wars — Hefner (Pure Records)
- 1999: Marillion.com — Marillion (Sanctuary Records)
- 1998: Rude Awakening — Toss the Feathers (Magnetic Music)
- 1998: The Three Pyramid Club — Suggs (Warner Bros. Records)
- 1998: This Way Up — Edward II (Ock Records)
- 1998: World Go Round — Matt Bianco (JVC)
- 1998: Stupid Stupid Stupid — Black Grape (MCA)
- 1998: A/C Collection — Matt Bianco (JVC)
- 1997: In It for the Money — Supergrass (Parlophone)
- 1996: Cottoning On — National Youth Jazz Orchestra (NYJO)
- 1996: Two Step To Heaven — Edward II (Cooking Vinyl)
- 1996: Zest — Edward II (Ock Records)
- 1995: In Control — National Youth Jazz Orchestra (NYJO)
- 1995: Close to You — The Brand New Heavies (FFRR)
- 1995: Gran Via — Matt Bianco (JVC)
- 1995: Prawns — Big Cheese All-Stars (Big Cheese)
- 1995: Pushing Against The Flow — Raw Stylus (Geffen)
- 1994: Hallmark — National Youth Jazz Orchestra (NYJO)
- 1994: Car Sex — Annabella Lwin (Sony)
- 1992: Dashing Away — Edward II (Pure Bliss)
- 1991: Wicked Men — Edward II (Pure Bliss)
- 1990: Freedom and Rain — Oyster Band & June Tabor (Cooking Vinyl)
