= Nu Troop =

British post-bop jazz group

Gary Crosby's Nu Troop
- Origin: London, United Kingdom
- Genres: Jazz
- Labels: Dune
- Members: Gary Crosby, Abram Wilson, Denys Baptiste, Andrew McCormack, Rod Youngs

Gary Crosby's Nu Troop is a post-bop jazz group formed in 1991 by musician Gary Crosby in London. Referred to by The Rough Guide to Jazz as "one of the most important UK bands", the group won the Best Ensemble award at the Jazz à Vienne festival in 1997, and their album of that year, Migrations, was described as "superb".

== History ==
Gary Crosby formed the post-bop acoustic jazz group in 1991. According to James Griffiths, writing in The Guardian: "The original Nu Troop was a conscious attempt to imitate Art Blakey's Jazz Messengers, with leader and bassist Gary Crosby (formerly of the Jazz Warriors) providing a nurturing environment for an ever-changing assembly of hot young players."

As well as Crosby on double bass, the group's line-up has included Abram Wilson on trumpet, Denys Baptiste on tenor saxophone, Neil Yates on trumpet, Andrew McCormack on piano and Rod Youngs on drums, with different incarnations of Nu Troop featuring Robert Michelle, Soweto Kinch, Sean Corby, Peter Edwards, Tony Kofi, and others.

== Albums ==
- Migrations (1997), Dune.

== See also ==
- Tomorrow's Warriors
