= Peter Edwards (pianist) =

British pianist, composer and band leader

- Education: Trinity Laban Conservatoire of Music and Dance
- Occupations: Pianist, composer and band leader
- Known for: Musical director of Tomorrow's Warriors' Nu Civilisation Orchestra
- Website: peteredwardsmusic.co.uk

Peter Edwards is a British pianist, composer and band leader, who is musical director of Tomorrow's Warriors' ensemble the Nu Civilisation Orchestra. He won the "Newcomer of the year" category of the 2015 Parliamentary Jazz Awards, and was nominated for the 2015 Jazz FM "Breakthrough Artist" award. Edwards composes and arranges music for large ensembles as well as writing for his own Peter Edwards Trio, and artists he has worked with include Mica Paris, Abram Wilson, Moses Boyd, Nicola Emmanuelle and Zara McFarlane.

== Career ==
Edwards earned a master's degree in Jazz from Trinity Laban Conservatoire of Music and Dance in 2009. He participated in the Tomorrow's Warriors young artist development programme and in 2008 an orchestra was established initially to provide a platform for Edwards to recreate Duke Ellington's rarely performed The Queen's Suite. The orchestra was subsequently established as a permanent ensemble called the Nu Civilisation Orchestra (NCO), under the musical direction of Edwards. The NCO has performed at the Queen Elizabeth Hall, Ronnie Scott's Jazz Club, and the Royal Northern College of Music.

In 2014, he released his first album with the Peter Edwards Trio, Safe And Sound, which jazz critic John Fordham as "guileless and soulful", and which was listed by MOJO Magazine among the top 10 jazz albums of the year. It was followed in 2016 by A Matter of Instinct. The group performed at the Montreal Jazz Festival and the recorded performance was later broadcast on BBC Radio's Jazz on 3 and on Jamie Cullum's BBC Radio 2 programme.

Edwards made his BBC Proms conducting debut in 2019 at the Royal Albert Hall performing the sacred music of Duke Ellington.
