= Tomorrow's Warriors =

British music education organisation (founded 1991)

- Founded: 1991; 35 years ago
- Headquarters: London, UK
- Key people: Janine Irons; Gary Crosby; Tomorrow's Warriors Trust
- Awards: 2017 Parliamentary Jazz Award for Jazz Education; 2021 Impact Award from Jazz FM
- Website: tomorrowswarriors.org

Tomorrow's Warriors (TW) is a jazz music education and artist development organisation that was co-founded in 1991 by Janine Irons and Gary Crosby, committed to championing diversity, inclusion and equality across the arts through jazz, with a special focus on "Black musicians, female musicians and those whose financial or other circumstances might lock them out of opportunities to pursue a career in the music industry". Crosby drew inspiration from having been a member of the Jazz Warriors, a London-based group of musicians that in the 1980s showcased many young Black British musicians who went on to achieve international success (among them Courtney Pine, Steve Williamson, Cleveland Watkiss, Phillip Bent, Orphy Robinson, as well as Crosby himself).

Tomorrow's Warriors, which has a multiracial make-up, provides a platform for young musicians wishing to pursue a career in jazz, and aims "to inspire, foster and grow a vibrant community of artists, audiences and leaders who together will transform the lives of future generations by increasing opportunity, diversity and excellence in and through jazz." The organisation's commitment to mentorship and community is embodied in the guiding principle "Each one teach one", whereby each generation supports the next. TW alumni have gone on to win many awards, including the Mercury Prize, given in 2023 to the Ezra Collective, who also won the accolade "Group of the Year" at the Brit Awards 2025.

Irons, a former vocalist turned manager and producer, and her partner Crosby also initiated the Dune Records label, drawing on talent from Tomorrow's Warriors, including such graduates of the organisation as Denys Baptiste, J-Life and Soweto Kinch.

Tomorrow's Warriors partners with venues, promoters and organisations across the UK to develop audience participation in jazz, with regular live public events. According to music journalist Richard Williams, "No single organisation has exerted a more profound or beneficial influence on jazz in Britain than Tomorrow's Warriors."

== Background ==
Since its inception by Gary Crosby and Janine Irons in 1991, Tomorrow's Warriors has worked towards devising and producing inspirational programmes and performance opportunities for new and emerging musicians, at the same time as developing culturally diverse audiences, being considered to have "nurtured many of the UK's leading jazz performers via its award-winning jazz education and emerging artists programme" with Tomorrow's Warriors alumni winning more than 50 awards and achieving successful careers in the music industry.

As noted by Henri Selmer Paris, the organisation is "committed to making jazz music accessible to all, by addressing in particular young people from ethnic minorities, women, and those whose financial situation might be an obstacle to learning or pursuing a musical career. This involves making the programme free, but also prospecting in the various communities of London."

Over the years, Tomorrow's Warriors' activities have included a regular jam session, formerly held weekly at The Jazz Café, then from 2004 at The Spice of Life in Soho, where it remained active until Summer 2010. The company went on to become a weekend resident at the Southbank Centre in London. The Tomorrow's Warriors' programme provides a wide variety of opportunities ranging from workshops and showcases for young musicians to concerts and tours for established professional bands and orchestras, partnering with a network of local, national and international arts organisations, as well as commercial producers, venues, promoters and festivals. Tomorrow's Warriors is a National Portfolio Organisation of Arts Council England.

Trustees of Tomorrow's Warriors include Steve Abbott, Viv Broughton, Peter Comber, Nick Cornforth, Gloria Fagbemiro, Camilla George, Jez Nelson, Nicky O'Donnell, Tove Okunniwa (chair) and Chris Panayi. In March 2026, marking the organisation's 35th anniversary, 12 inaugural patrons were announced – Baroness Amos, Margaret Busby (formerly a trustee); Nick Hornby; Guy Chambers; Robert Elms; Lizzie Ridding and John Ridding; Michael Watt; Richard Wyatt, and alumni Femi Koleoso, ESKA and Moses Boyd – as well as a new partnership with London bookseller Foyles.

== Ensembles ==
Members of Tomorrow's Warriors, as well as participating in informal jam sessions, may go on to join one of the more formal ensembles, which include Tomorrow's Warriors StringTing, Tomorrow's Warriors Female Collective, a Junior Band (for young musicians aged between 11 and 15), Tomorrow's Warriors Youth Orchestra, and the flagship Nu Civilisation Orchestra.

=== Nu Civilisation Orchestra ===
In 2008, Tomorrow's Warriors established an orchestra initially to provide a platform for pianist/composer Peter Edwards – who was a participant in the young artist development programme – to recreate Duke Ellington's rarely performed The Queen's Suite. The orchestra was subsequently established as a permanent ensemble, under the musical direction of Edwards, called the Nu Civilisation Orchestra (NCO).

Other major projects undertaken by the NCO include in 2013 a 50th-anniversary recreation of Charles Mingus's The Black Saint and the Sinner Lady (1963) at the Purcell Room, about which London Jazz News wrote: "The ensemble was flawless. ...hard to imagine anyone in the packed Purcell room doubting that this was a moving, breathing work. The recording remains a wonder, but recreated live the music seemed fresh as ever and more vividly coloured, more intense. The result was like getting up close to a great painting you have only seen in reproduction: you get a fresh sense of why it is a masterpiece. I really hope it can be heard more widely." More recently the NCO performed a live soundtrack to John Akomfrah's 2013 film The Stuart Hall Project, and on International Women's Day 2017 played a concert of songs (featuring Lisa Hannigan, Sabrina Mahfouz and ESKA) from Joni Mitchell's classic 1976 album Hejira, at the Royal Festival Hall as part of the Women of the World Festival.

In April 2017, it was announced that the NCO had secured a new residency at Rich Mix in east London.

In 2020, the Jazz Hang initiative was announced, with Tomorrow's Warriors and Trinity Laban Conservatoire of Music and Dance joining forces in a collaboration "to redress the balance in representation at the grassroots level in the UK jazz scene by reaching out to young musicians from diverse backgrounds and introducing them to playing jazz", "providing the tools for them to find their own sound."

In 2022, as part of the EFG London Jazz Festival, the Nu Civilisation Orchestra led by musical director Peter Edwards and featuring ESKA on vocals undertook a national tour presenting Mitchell's Hejira and Mingus about which the reviewer for The Arts Desk said: "Exceeding all hopes, this made Mingus and Mitchell's visions as vivid as they've ever been, and as breathtakingly advanced. An unbelievable experience."

On 15 September 2023, at the Royal Festival Hall, a 32-piece all-string version of the NCO with saxophonist Nubya Garcia, an alumna of Tomorrow's Warriors, performed their exploration of Stan Getz's 1962 album Focus, together with two new works by Black British composers Oleta Haffner and the NCO's Peter Edwards – in a well-reviewed concert, described as "instantly setting a new standard for the creative use of a string orchestra in jazz ... in a performance that mixed care and joy in admirable proportion."

== Other initiatives ==
In 2016, Tomorrow's Warriors announced a partnership with Jazz House Kids in Montclair, New Jersey, through which four young people from the Tomorrow's Warriors Young Artist Development Programme have been given scholarships to take part in the Jazz House Kids Summer Workshop at Montclair State University.

In March 2017, Tomorrow's Warriors launched a new music education initiative, The Jazz Ticket, to mark the centenary of the birth of six iconic jazz figures: composer Tadd Dameron, vocalist Ella Fitzgerald, trumpeter Dizzy Gillespie, pianist Thelonious Monk, drummer Buddy Rich and percussionist Mongo Santamaria. As reported by Jazz FM, "'The Jazz Ticket' will be delivered in 54 schools in Southampton, Luton, Leicestershire, Manchester, Gateshead, Brighton, Bristol, Hull and London, and engage almost 600 young people as performers and many more as audience members."

From 30 May to 3 June 2017, Tomorrow's Warriors was in residence at the Black Cultural Archives (BCA) in Brixton, delivering performances and workshops alongside the BCA's Black Sound exhibition.

In 2021, the organisation's 30th anniversary was celebrated with a variety of activities, culminating with "A Great Day in London" at the Southbank Centre's Queen Elizabeth Hall, billed as "the greatest London jazz happening in a generation", as Jazzwise magazine noted: "a gathering on a par with Art Kane's iconic 1958 photo A Great Day in Harlem. Even greater, maybe, given that each musician in the sprawling QEH line-up had a common denominator, and was fundraising for the same cause: Tomorrow’s Warriors, the pioneering jazz music development charity celebrating its 30th anniversary year." A five-star review in The Telegraph concluded: "Tomorrow's Warriors' contribution to Jazz – not just British Jazz – has been nothing short of monumental. Their youth ensembles, Junior Band and Female Frontline, demonstrated the dizzy levels of talent rising from the next generation of young players. There's no doubt that it was indeed a Great Day In London."

In November 2023, continuing its mission "to support of the next jazz generation", Tomorrow's Warriors launched a drive to help sustain its free-to-access Young Artist Development Programme and Emerging Artist Programme.

== Awards, recognition and legacy ==
In 2017, Tomorrow's Warriors won the Parliamentary Jazz Award for Jazz Education, and further awards went to alumni: Nérija, an all-female ensemble developed from Tomorrow's Warriors' Female Collective, won Best Newcomer, while Shabaka Hutchings was Jazz Instrumentalist of the Year. Across the categories 14 alumni were shortlisted.

Tomorrow's Warriors alumni have also been well represented at the Jazz FM Awards. In 2019, some 19 of the 39 nominees for awards were former Tomorrow's Warriors; Jazzwise reported that at the presentation ceremony "act after act cites the Tomorrow's Warriors organisation as a crucial factor in their musical development."

In October 2021, Tomorrow's Warriors was honoured with the Impact Award from Jazz FM.

In July 2023, the Parliamentary Jazz Award for "Jazz Newcomer of the Year" went to Tomorrow's Warriors alumnus Sultan Stevenson.

In September 2023, the Ezra Collective, a quintet composed of drummer and bandleader Femi Koleoso, bassist TJ Koleoso, keyboardist Joe Armon-Jones, trumpeter Ife Ogunjobi, and tenor saxophonist James Mollison, who first met as participants of Tomorrow's Warriors, became the first jazz act to win the Mercury Prize in its 31-year history, Following the announcement of the award, Femi Koleoso paid tribute to the band's origins, saying: "This moment we're celebrating right here is testimony to good, special people putting time and effort into [helping] young people to play music.… let's continue to support that." At the Brit Awards 2025, the Ezra Collective went on to further acclaim, becoming the first jazz band to win "Group of the Year", with frontman Koleoso again acknowledging the importance of their early opportunities through Tomorrow's Warriors and the need to sustain funding for such youth music education initiatives.

UK Jazz News has stated: "So much of the vibrant young London Jazz scene owes a huge debt to Tomorrow's Warriors, not only in providing a supportive environment for young British black jazz musicians but also by encouraging them to develop jazz music true to themselves that might also incorporate musical influences from Africa, the Caribbean, hip-hop and soul."

Among influential names in the music industry who have spoken in support of the mission of Tomorrow's Warriors, Cerys Matthews describes the organisation as "the musical heart of the British jazz scene", while Gilles Peterson states: "Tomorrow's Warriors occupies a unique and vital space in our cultural landscape. Their work in helping positively shape future generations is of critical importance especially in light of the tribulations we currently face."

== Alumni ==
Graduates of Tomorrow's Warriors development programmes who have gone on to pursue successful careers include:

- Yazz Ahmed
- Joe Armon-Jones
- Denys Baptiste
- Moses Boyd
- Theon Cross
- Julie Dexter
- Peter Edwards
- Eska
- Nathaniel Facey
- Nubya Garcia
- Binker Golding
- Camilla George
- Shabaka Hutchings
- Soweto Kinch
- Cassie Kinoshi
- Femi Koleoso
- TJ Koleoso
- James Mollison
- Zara McFarlane
- Andrew McCormack
- Sheila Maurice-Grey
- Jay Phelps
- Byron Wallen
- Jason Yarde
