= Gary Crosby =

Gary Crosby may refer to:

- Gary Crosby (actor) (1933–1995), American singer and actor, son of Bing Crosby
- Gary Crosby (bassist) (born 1955), British double bass player
- Gary Crosby (footballer) (born 1964), former Nottingham Forest winger
