= Emma Rawicz =

English jazz musician

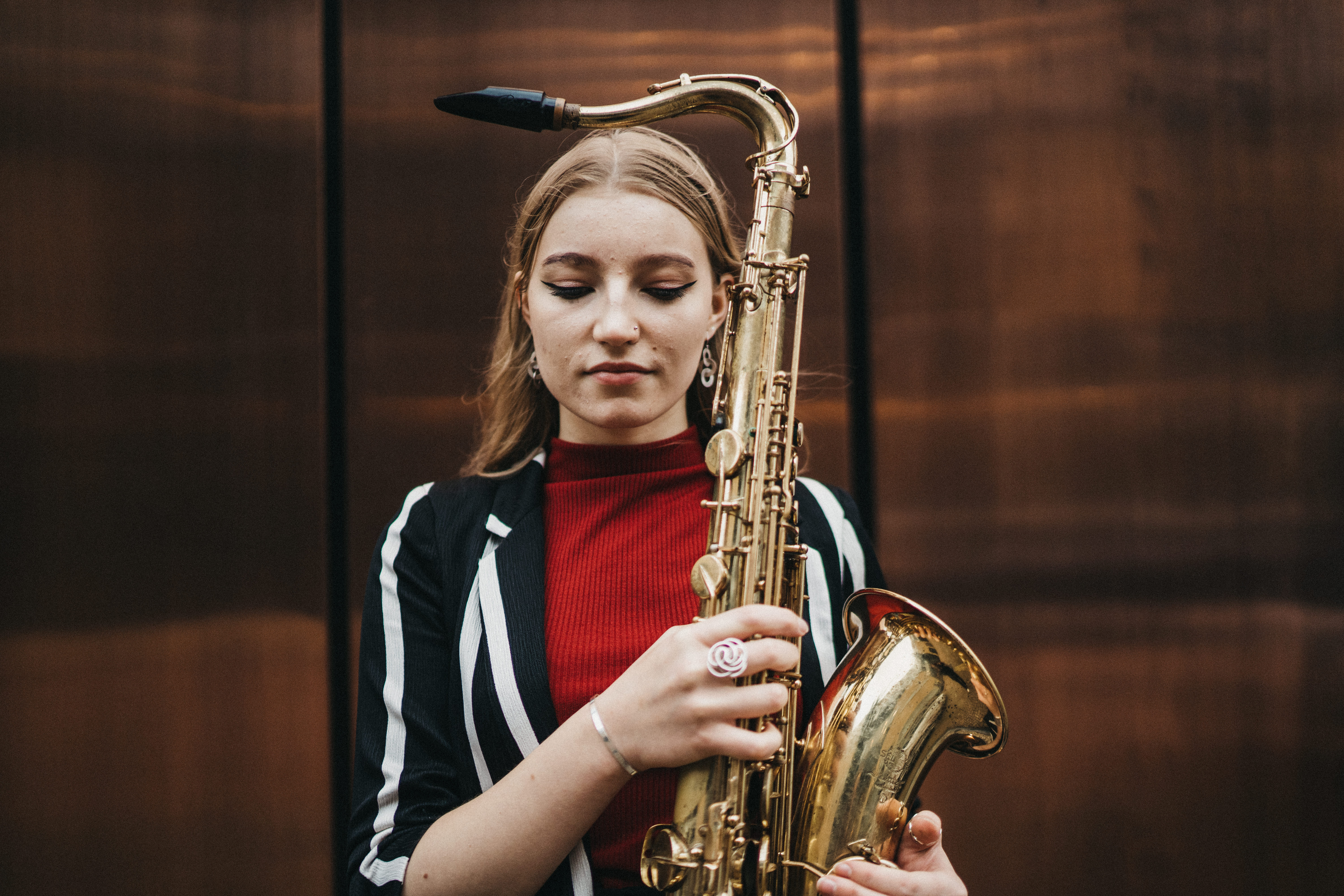
- Born: Emma Rawicz-Szczerbo
- Education: Junior Guildhall School of Music and Drama, Chetham's School of Music
- Alma mater: Royal Academy of Music
- Occupations: jazz musician, saxophonist, composer and bandleader
- Awards: Jazz Newcomer of the Year at Parliamentary Jazz Awards 2022

Emma Rawicz is a London-based jazz musician, saxophonist, composer and bandleader.

== Career ==
Emma Rawicz won Jazz Newcomer of the Year at the Parliamentary Jazz Awards 2022, won a Drake YolanDa award in 2021, was a finalist in BBC Young Musician Jazz Award 2022 and nominated for Instrumentalist of the Year at Jazz FM Awards 2021.

Rawicz has chromesthesia, a type of synesthesia that involves seeing colours when hearing sounds. On ACT Music, her second album of original compositions, Chroma, is named after the Ancient Greek word for colour.

Rawicz grew up in Devon, playing classical violin and then switching to the saxophone from the age of 15 years old, studying at Junior Guildhall School of Music and Drama, Chetham's School of Music and then the Royal Academy of Music, with support and guidance from various experienced performers including Gareth Lockrane, Ivo Neame and Nikki Iles.

The Emma Rawicz Jazz Orchestra has performed self-composed music at Ronnie Scott's Jazz Club, at which Rawicz also is one of the regular hosts of the Late Late Shows.

Jazz FM broadcast a radio episode in which Rawicz performed and was interviewed as an expert in the life and works of John Coltrane.

Rawicz has some Polish heritage through her grandfather and is also known by the full name Emma Rawicz-Szczerbo.
