= Julie Dexter =

British jazz singer

- Born: Handsworth, Birmingham, England
- Genres: Jazz, soul, reggae
- Occupations: Singer, songwriter and producer
- Formerly of: Tomorrow's Warriors; J-Life
- Website: juliedexter.com/home

Julie Dexter is a British singer, songwriter and producer, whose music spans the categories of jazz, soul and reggae. She was born and raised in Birmingham, England, and has been based in the United States since 1999. Notable musicians with whom she has worked include Courtney Pine, Soweto Kinch, Jason Yarde, and others.

== Biography ==
Born in Handsworth, Birmingham, England, to Jamaican parents, Julie Dexter was about four years old when she moved to Kings Norton, where she attended Primrose Hill Primary School, Turves Green Girls' School and then Joseph Chamberlain Sixth Form College. She went on to study in London at Middlesex University, where her contemporary was saxophonist Jason Yarde. Already a member of The Jazz Warriors, Yarde invited her to a Sunday jam session at the Jazz Cafe, where bassist Gary Crosby later formed Tomorrow's Warriors, of which Dexter was an early member.

Dexter was vocalist in the successful band J-Life, a quintet led by Jason Yarde, that arose out of the Tomorrow's Warriors workshop project conceived by Crosby: J-Life won the International Jazz Federation 16th European Jazz competition at Leverkusen, Germany, as well as the 1998 Perrier Award for Young Jazz Ensemble of the Year, with Dexter winning the Perrier Award for Young Jazz Vocalist of the Year. She counts among her influences Nancy Wilson and Bob Marley.

Dexter toured the world with Courtney Pine as lead singer with his group, before in 1999 moving to the United States, where she settled in Atlanta, Georgia. She set up her own label, Ketch A Vibe Records, on which she released in 2000 her EP Peace of Mind, followed by Dexterity (2002), Conscious (2005) and New Again (2011). Moon Bossa, a collaboration with Khari Simmons, was released in 2007, and Dexter's single "Ketch A Vibe" was featured in national radio ads for then Democratic presidential candidate Barack Obama.

== Discography ==
- 2003: Dexterity (Ketch A Vibe)
- 2005: Conscious (CD Baby / Ketch A Vibe)
- 2006: Moon Bossa (Brash Music)
- 2011: New Again (Ketch A Vibe)
- 2013: New Again: The Remixes (MMP Records/Ketch A Vibe Records)
- 2016: Blue Skies, Meditative Funk (feat. Julie Dexter)
- 2019: Déjà Vu. Produced by Julie Dexter, Daz-I-Que and Khari Cabral Simmons
