= London Jazz Festival =

Annual music festival in England

- Genre: Jazz
- Dates: November
- Location(s): London, England
- Years active: 1992–present
- Capacity: 10,000
- Website: efglondonjazzfestival.org.uk

The London Jazz Festival is a music festival held every November. It takes place in London venues such as the Barbican and the Royal Festival Hall and in smaller jazz clubs, such as Ronnie Scott's and the Vortex Jazz Club. It is produced by Serious.

== History ==
In 1970 the London Borough of Camden added a Jazz Week to the Camden Festival. During the next fifteen years, the Camden Jazz Weeks were held at venues around the borough: Bloomsbury Theatre, Logan Hall, London Forum, Roundhouse, and Shaw Theatre. By the early nineties, the Camden Festival was closed. In 1992 the company Serious, which had produced the Camden festival, started the London Jazz Festival with help from the London Arts Board.

In 2011, the festival was produced in association with BBC Radio 3. The festival is branded as the EFG London Jazz Festival, reflecting headline sponsorship since 2013 by EFG Private Bank, part of Switzerland's EFG International.

A history of the festival was published in 2017 to commemorate its 25th anniversary. Written by Emma Webster and George McKay, the book arose from collaboration between the festival and the University of East Anglia and was funded by the Arts & Humanities Research Council (2015–16). McKay was the inaugural Professor in Residence at the 2014 festival, and Webster the Researcher-in-Residence in 2016. The book covers the history of London as a city of jazz festivals since about 1949 and includes material on festivals at Bracknell, Camden, Crawley, and Richmond/Reading.

In 2018, the final of the BBC Young Jazz Musician competition formed part of the festival, and the performances at the Queen Elizabeth Hall were broadcast the following day by BBC Four.

== Previous editions ==
=== 2023 ===
China Moses, Omar, Brendan Reilly, Judi Jackson, Naomi Banks, Vanessa Haynes, Emeli Sandé, Makaya McCraven with the London Contemporary Orchestra, Marcus Miller and Camilla George, Catrin Finch and Aoife Ni Bhriain, Cecile McLorin Salvant, Ron Carter and Foresight, Angelique Kidjo, London Brew, Esperanza Spalding, and goat (jp).
