= King's Medal for Music =

- Awarded for: "an outstanding individual or group of musicians who have had a major influence on the musical life of the nation."
- Sponsored by: Privy Purse
- Location: London
- Country: United Kingdom
- Presented by: The British monarch
- Rewards: The 75mm medal is designed by Bethan Williams and is cast in silver.
- First award: 2005

The King's Medal for Music (or the Queen's Medal for Music during the reign of a queen) is an annual award, instituted in 2005, for contribution to the musical life of Great Britain. The Medal may be awarded to people of any nationality. The expenses of the award come from the Privy Purse.

The idea for this award originated with Sir Peter Maxwell Davies, then Master of the Queen's Music. A committee headed by the Master of the Queen's Music oversees the nomination process for the award. This committee discusses the nominees in an annual meeting, before it submits its recommendation for royal approval. The first recipient was the Australian conductor Sir Charles Mackerras.

== Recipients ==
- 2005 Sir Charles Mackerras
- 2006 Sir Bryn Terfel
- 2007 Judith Weir
- 2008 Kathryn Tickell
- 2009 Sir Colin Davis
- 2010 Dame Emma Kirkby
- 2011 Nicholas Daniel
- 2012 National Youth Orchestra of Great Britain
- 2013 Sir Thomas Allen
- 2014 Simon Halsey
- 2015 Oliver Knussen
- 2016 Nicola Benedetti
- 2017 Thea Musgrave
- 2018 Gary Crosby
- 2019 Imogen Cooper
- 2020 Thomas Trotter
- 2021 John Wallace
- 2023 Dame Sarah Connolly
- 2024 Kathryn Stott
- 2025 Sir James MacMillan
