= Parliamentary Jazz Awards =

Jazz award ceremony

The Parliamentary Jazz Awards in the United Kingdom are organised by the All Party Parliamentary Jazz Appreciation Group (APPJAG) at the Houses of Parliament in London. The group consists of over a hundred members drawn from across the UK political parties. The awards were the brainchild Bob Blizzard (Waveney MP), a long-time enthusiast of the jazz genre who was concerned that there was a lack of national recognition for the work of jazz performers and venues across the UK. Blizzard was involved with organising and running the awards for 11 years. Also supporting the awards are Jazz Services, Jazz UK, Jazzwise, the UK Musicians' Union jazz section, and PPL.

There are nine categories:

1. Jazz Musician of the Year
2. Jazz Ensemble of the Year
3. Jazz Venue of the Year
4. Jazz Journalist of the Year
5. Jazz CD of the Year (released during the previous year by a band or musician)
6. Jazz Broadcaster of the Year
7. Jazz Publication of the Year
8. Jazz Education Award (for a person who has contributed to jazz in education)
9. Services to Jazz Award

In 2009, a special award was presented to Ronnie Scott's Jazz Club, as a tribute to the 50th anniversary of the well-known London club that year.

== Winners ==
=== 2008 ===
- Jazz Musician of the Year: Liane Carroll
- Jazz CD: The Amadeus Project – Guy Barker
- Jazz Ensemble – Empirical
- Jazz Venue: Tithe Barn, Needham, Norfolk
- Jazz Journalist: John Fordham
- Jazz Broadcaster: Helen Mayhew
- Jazz Publication: Jazz UK
- Jazz Educator: Dennis Rollins
- Services to Jazz Award: Paul Pace (of Ray's Jazz)

=== 2009 ===
- Jazz Musician of the Year: Phil Robson
- Jazz CD of the Year: Howeird, The Sam Crockatt Quartet
- Jazz Ensemble of the Year: The Ryan Quigley Sextet
- Jazz Venue of the Year: Fleece Jazz (South East England)
- Jazz Journalist of the Year: Kevin Le Gendre
- Jazz Broadcaster of the Year: Sarah Ward
- Jazz Publication of the Year: jazzreloaded.com
- Jazz Education Award: Richard Michael
- Services to Jazz Award: Val Wilmer

=== 2010 ===
- Jazz Musician: Mark Lockheart
- Jazz CD: No Messin by the Gareth Lockrane Septet
- Jazz Ensemble: the Nigel Price Organ Trio
- Jazz Venue: the Jazz Bar, Edinburgh
- Jazz Journalist: Mike Flynn
- Jazz Broadcaster: Alyn Shipton
- Jazz Publication: Jazzwise
- Jazz Educator: Kathy Dyson
- Services to Jazz Award: Brian Blane

=== 2011 ===
- Jazz Musician of the Year: Brian Kellock
- Jazz Album of the Year: Midas, John Turville
- Jazz Ensemble of the Year: Brass Jaw
- Jazz Promoter/Venue of the Year: The Hideaway (Streatham, London)
- Jazz Journalist of the Year: John Fordham
- Jazz Broadcaster of the Year: Paul Barnes
- Jazz Publication of the Year: Goin' Home: The Uncompromising Life and Music of Ken Colyer by Mike Pointon, Ray Smith, Martin Colyer
- Jazz Education Award: Ian Darrington
- Services to Jazz Award: Coleridge Goode
- Special Award: Cleo Laine

=== 2012 ===
- Jazz Album of the Year: Up and Down, Liane Carroll

=== 2013 ===
- Jazz Musician of the Year: Guy Barker
- Jazz Album of the Year: Saltash Bells, John Surman (ECM)
- Jazz Ensemble of the Year: Impossible Gentlemen
- Jazz Venue Award: The Vortex Jazz Club, London
- Jazz Journalist of the Year: Rob Adams
- Jazz Broadcaster of the Year: Mike Chadwick
- Jazz Publication of the Year: Benny Goodman's Famous 1938 Carnegie Hall Jazz Concert, Catherine Tackley –
- Jazz Education Award: Nick Smart
- Services to Jazz Award: Stan Tracey
- Special Award: Elaine Delmar

=== 2014 ===
- Jazz Vocalist of the Year – Christine Tobin
- Jazz Instrumentalist of the Year – Arun Ghosh
- Jazz Album of the Year – Live at Cheltenham 13 Jazz Festival, Troykestra
- Jazz Ensemble of the Year – Beats & Pieces Big Band
- Jazz Newcomer of the Year – Phil Meadows
- Jazz Venue of the Year – EFG London Jazz Festival
- Jazz Media Award – The Jamie Cullum Show
- Jazz Education Award – Issie Barratt, National Youth Jazz Collective
- Services to Jazz Award – David Redfern
- Special Award – Chris Barber

=== 2015 ===
- Jazz Vocalist of the Year: Norma Winstone
- Jazz Instrumentalist of the Year: Laura Jurd
- Jazz Album of the Year: Swamp by Partisans
- Jazz Ensemble of the Year: Engines Orchestra
- Jazz Venue of the Year: St Ives Jazz Club
- Jazz Newcomer of the Year: Peter Edwards
- Jazz Media Award: London Jazz News website
- Jazz Education Award: National Youth Jazz Orchestra
- Services to Jazz Award: Chris Hodgkins
- Special Award: Peter Ind

=== 2016 ===
- Jazz Vocalist of the Year: Emilia Mårtensson
- Jazz Instrumentalist of the Year: Alexander Hawkins
- Jazz Album of the Year: Let It Be Told, Julian Argüelles
- Jazz Ensemble of the Year: Empirical
- Jazz Venue of the Year Jazz: Seven Jazz Leeds
- Jazz Newcomer of the Year: Binker and Moses
- Jazz Media Award: Jez Nelson, BBC Jazz on 3
- Jazz Education Award: Tommy Smith
- Services to Jazz Award: Mary Greig
- APPJAG Special Awards: Michael Connarty and Evan Parker

=== 2017 ===
- Jazz Vocalist of the Year: Cleveland Watkiss
- Jazz Instrumentalist of the Year: Shabaka Hutchings
- Jazz Album of the Year: Together As One, Dinosaur
- Jazz Ensemble of the Year: Phronesis
- Jazz Venue of the Year Jazz: Scarborough Jazz Festival
- Jazz Newcomer of the Year: Nerija
- Jazz Media Award: Chris Philips
- Jazz Education Award: Tomorrow's Warriors
- Services to Jazz Award: Tony Dudley-Evans
- APPJAG Special Awards: Jim Mullen

=== 2018 ===
- Jazz Vocalist of the Year: Ian Shaw
- Jazz Instrumentalist of the Year: Arun Ghosh
- Jazz Album of the Year: The Late Train, Denys Baptiste
- Jazz Ensemble of the Year: Alison Rayner Quartet
- Jazz Venue of the Year Jazz: Jazz at the Lescar, Sheffield
- Jazz Newcomer of the Year: Shirley Tetteh
- Jazz Media Award: Lance Liddle
- Jazz Education Award: Jean Toussaint
- Services to Jazz Award: Jill Rodger
- APPJAG Special Award: Gary Crosby OBE

=== 2019 ===
- Jazz Vocalist of the Year: Zoe Gilby
- Jazz Instrumentalist of the Year: Josephine Davies
- Jazz Album of the Year: Turas, Fergus McCreadie
- Jazz Ensemble of the Year: Ezra Collective
- Jazz Venue of the Year Jazz: Watermill Jazz, Dorking
- Jazz Newcomer of the Year: Xhosa Cole
- Jazz Media Award: Ian Mann
- Jazz Education Award: Nikki Iles
- Services to Jazz Award: Cleo Laine
- APPJAG Special Award: Henry Lowther

=== 2020 ===
- Jazz Vocalist of the Year: Cherise Adams-Burnett
- Jazz Instrumentalist of the Year: Sarah Tandy
- Jazz Album of the Year: Finding Home – Kate Williams Four Plus Three meets Georgia Mancio
- Jazz Ensemble of the Year: Nikki Iles Big Band
- Jazz Newcomer of the Year: Luca Manning
- Jazz Venue of the Year: PizzaExpress Jazz Club
- Jazz Media Award: Corey Mwamba “Freeness” BBC Radio 3
- Jazz Education Award: Jon Eno BEM
- Services to Jazz Award: Blow The Fuse
- Special APPJAG Award: Jazzwise

=== 2021 ===
- Jazz Vocalist of the Year: Georgia Mancio
- Jazz Instrumentalist of the Year: Nubya Garcia
- Jazz Album of the Year: Songs and Stories (Stunt Records), Callum Au and Claire Martin
- Jazz Ensemble of the Year: KOKOROKO
- Jazz Newcomer of the Year: Jas Kayser
- Jazz Venue of the Year: Peggy’s Skylight
- Jazz Media Award: Women In Jazz Media
- Jazz Education Award: The Original UK Summer School
- Services to Jazz Award: Norma Winstone
- Lockdown Innovation Award: The Globe – Newcastle upon Tyne
- Special APPJAG Award: Digby Fairweather, Lord Colwyn

=== 2022 ===
- Jazz Vocalist of the Year: Claire Martin
- Jazz Instrumentalist of the Year: Tony Kofi
- Jazz Venue/Promoter/Festival of the Year: The Globe Newcastle upon Tyne, Debra Milne: Rob Heron
- Jazz Media Award: Jane Cornwell
- Jazz Education Award: Jazz Camp For Girls Helena Summerfield – Jazz North
- Jazz Album of the Year: Boxed In, Daniel Casimir
- Jazz Ensemble of the Year: Kansas Smitty’s House Band
- Jazz Newcomer of the Year: Emma Rawicz
- Services to Jazz Award: Mike Westbrook
- Special Award: Barbara Thompson

=== 2023 ===
- Jazz Vocalist of the Year: Elaine Delmar
- Jazz Instrumentalist of the Year: Gary Husband
- Jazz Album of the Year: When Winter Turns To Spring, Jo Harrop and Paul Edis
- Jazz Ensemble of the Year: Ubunye
- Jazz Newcomer of the Year: Sultan Stevenson
- Jazz Venue of the Year: Jazz at the Blue Lamp
- Jazz Media Award: The Jazz Rag
- PizzaExpress Live Jazz Photographer of the Year: Monika Jakubowska
- Jazz Education Award: Hannah Horton, J Steps, Saffron Centre For Young Musicians, Saffron Walden.
- Services to Jazz Award: Janine Irons
- Special APPJG Award: Tony Haynes and the Grand Union Orchestra

=== 2024 ===
- Jazz Vocalist of the Year: Emma Smith
- Jazz Instrumentalist of the Year: Emma Rawicz
- Jazz Album of the Year: The Colour Of Sound, Zoe Rahman
- Jazz Ensemble of the Year: Alina Bzhezhinska’s HipHarpCollective
- Jazz Newcomer of the Year: Ife Ogunjobi
- Jazz Venue of the Year: The Verdict, Brighton
- Jazz Media Award: Gilles Peterson
- Jazz Education Award: Nikki Yeoh
- Services to Jazz Award: George Nelson – Moment’s Notice
- Special APPJG Award: Anita Wardell and Paula Gardiner

=== 2025 ===
- Jazz Vocalist of the Year: Zara McFarlane
- Jazz Instrumentalist of the Year: Rob Luft
- Jazz Album of the Year: Words Unspoken, John Surman
- Jazz Ensemble of the Year: The Banger Factory
- Jazz Newcomer of the Year: Donovan Haffner
- Jazz Venue of the Year: Digbeth Jazz
- Jazz Media Award: ‘Round Midnight with Soweto Kinch – Folded Wing for BBC Radio 3
- Jazz Education Award: Doncaster Youth Jazz Orchestra (DYJO)
- Services to Jazz Award: Marianne Windham
- Special APPJG Award: Chris Philips
- Martin Hummel Award: Olivia Cuttill
