= Empirical (band) =

British jazz band (formed 2007)

Empirical is a British jazz group, formed in 2007. Critic Brian Morton described the band in 2022 as "one of the great British contributions to European jazz".

Empirical was formed partly by students at the Trinity College of Music in London. The original line-up was trumpeter Jay Phelps, alto saxophonist Nathaniel Facey, pianist Kit Downes, bassist Neil Charles and drummer Shaney Forbes. Their eponymous first album came in 2007 and was produced by Courtney Pine, who also played on the recording. On the back of the release, the band toured extensively in Europe.

Bassist Tom Farmer replaced Charles in 2007 and George Fogel and Freddy Gravita replaced Downes and Phelps for concert performances in 2009. Saxophonist Julian Seigel was present for their second album, Out 'n' In. It was a homage to Eric Dolphy's Out to Lunch! album; most of the compositions were originals. The subsequent Elements of Truth was recorded for Naim Records; vibraphonist Lewis Wright replaced Seigel and most of the compositions were written by Farmer. The same quartet later recorded Tabula Rasa and Connection, as well as two EPs. Connection was their fifth release and their first on Cuneiform Records. It was recorded in 2015. A reviewer for Cadence concluded that: "This is a band who knows how to maintain interest over a disc with variety and top notch playing." Adding pianist Jason Rebello and tenor saxophonist Alex Hitchcock on some tracks, Empirical recorded Wonder Is the Beginning for Whirlwind Recordings in 2022.

Wright left Empirical in 2024. Two years later, Whirlwind released Like Lambs: To the Slaughter, with the surviving trio augmented by pianist Ivo Neame and guitarist David Preston.

== Awards ==
- 2008 Parliamentary Jazz Awards – best ensemble
- 2009 Shaney Forbes – Worshipful Company of Musicians Young jazz musician award
- 2010 MOBO awards – best jazz act
- 2010 Nathaniel Facey – Worshipful Company of Musicians Young jazz musician award
- 2011 Lewis Wright – Worshipful Company of Musicians Young jazz musician award
- 2016 Parliamentary Jazz Awards – best ensemble

== Discography ==
Year recorded	Year released	Title	Label	Notes
	2007	Empirical	Destin-E	Most tracks Jay Phelps (trumpet, vocals), Nathaniel Facey (alto sax, vocals), Kit Downes (piano), Neil Charles (bass), Shaney Forbes (drums, percussion); some tracks Dennis Rollins (trombone), Courtney Pine (bass clarinet) added
	2009	Out 'n' In	Naim	Julian Seigel (tenor sax, bass clarinet), Nathaniel Facey (alto sax), Tom Farmer (bass), Shaney Forbes (drums)
	2011	Elements of Truth	Naim	Nathaniel Facey (alto sax), Lewis Wright (vibraphone), Tom Farmer (bass), Shaney Forbes (drums)
	2013	Tabula Rasa	Naim	Nathaniel Facey (alto sax), Lewis Wright (vibraphone), Tom Farmer (bass), Shaney Forbes (drums); seven tracks add the Benyounes String Quartet (Zara Benyounes and Emily Holland (violin), Sara Roberts (viola), Kim Vaughan (cello)
2015	2016	Connection	Cuneiform	Nathaniel Facey (alto sax), Lewis Wright (vibraphone), Tom Farmer (bass), Shaney Forbes (drums)
2017	2018	Indifference Culture	Empirical Music	Nathaniel Facey (alto sax), Lewis Wright (vibraphone), Tom Farmer (bass), Shaney Forbes (drums); EP
2017	2019	Distraction Tactics	Empirical Music	Nathaniel Facey (alto sax), Lewis Wright (vibraphone), Tom Farmer (bass), Shaney Forbes (drums); EP
2021	2022	Like Lambs	(Self-released)	Nathaniel Facey (alto sax), Lewis Wright (vibraphone), Tom Farmer (bass), Shaney Forbes (drums); EP
2022	2024	Wonder Is the Beginning	Whirlwind	Most tracks quintet, with Nathaniel Facey (alto sax), Lewis Wright (vibraphone), Jason Rebello (piano), Tom Farmer (bass), Shaney Forbes (drums); some tracks sextet, with Alex Hitchcock (tenor sax) added; other tracks with different combinations
	2026	Like Lambs: To the Slaughter	Whirlwind	Nathaniel Facey (alto sax), Ivo Neame (piano), David Preston (guitar), Tom Farmer (bass), Shaney Forbes (drums)
