= Arts Council England =

Arts organisation in London, England

- Type: Non-departmental public body and charity
- Industry: Arts
- Founded: 1994
- Headquarters: Manchester, England
- Key people: Sir Nicholas Serota, chair
- Products: Research, grants, music education hubs
- Revenue: ▲£993 million GBP (2019)
- Number of employees: 639
- Website: artscouncil.org.uk

Arts Council England is an arm's length non-departmental public body of the Department for Culture, Media and Sport. It is also a registered charity. It was formed in 1994 when the Arts Council of Great Britain was divided into three separate bodies for England, Scotland and Wales. The arts funding system in England underwent considerable reorganisation in 2002 when all of the regional arts boards were subsumed into Arts Council England and became regional offices of the national organisation.

Arts Council England is a government-funded body dedicated to promoting the performing, visual and literary arts in England. Since 1994, Arts Council England has been responsible for distributing lottery funding. This investment has helped to transform the building stock of arts organisations and to create many additional high-quality arts activities.

On 1 October 2011 the Museums, Libraries and Archives Council was subsumed into the Arts Council in England and they assumed the responsibilities of the council.

== History ==
The Arts Council of Great Britain was created in 1946 by Royal Charter on the initiative of John Maynard Keynes. It received a revised charter in 1967. On 1 April 1994, it was divided to form the Arts Council of England, the Scottish Arts Council, and the Arts Council of Wales, each with their own new Royal Charter; the Arts Council of Northern Ireland already existed as a distinct body. At the same time, the National Lottery was established and the Arts Council of England became one of the distribution bodies. This increased responsibility saw the Arts Council of England grow back in size to the point where it was larger than before the 1987 restructuring.

In 2001 Chairman Gerry Robinson announced a further restructuring in which the Arts Council of England would be merged with the ten regional arts boards to form a single organisation: Arts Council England.

== Governance and administration ==
Arts Council England has a national council of 15 members, including the chair. The national council meets ten times a year and is made up of representatives of the arts community with five of the members also representing the area councils. Each area council has a board of 15 members made up of representatives of their arts community and local government. There are five area councils:

- North
- Midlands
- London
- South East
- South West

The chief executive of the Arts Council England is appointed by the Department of Culture, Media and Sport. Alan Davey was chief executive from 2008 to 2014. He was succeeded by Darren Henley. Each area council has an executive director and each art form has a specialist advisor. The Arts Council England divides its funding into the following headings:

- Combined Art (Festivals)
- Dance
- Education
- Literature
- Music
- Research
- Theatre
- Touring
- Visual Arts

=== Chairs of Arts Council England ===
- Grey Gowrie (foundation–1998), 2nd Earl of Gowrie, former Arts Minister, poet and art dealer
- Sir Gerrard Robinson (1998–2004), businessman and executive
- Sir Christopher Frayling (2004–February 2009); Rector of the Royal College of Art (London)
- Dame Elizabeth Forgan (2009–2013); broadcaster and journalist
- Sir Peter Bazalgette (2013–2016); Executive Chairman of ITV plc
- Sir Nicholas Serota (2017–2026); former Director of the Tate
- Dawn Airey CBE (2026–present); former media executive, Chancellor of Edge Hill University

=== Executive officers ===
- Mary Allen: secretary general, 1994–1997
- Peter Hewitt: chief executive, 1997–2008
- Alan Davey: chief executive, 2008–2014
- Darren Henley: chief executive, 2014 to present

== Funding programmes ==
Arts Council England is a distributor of a core funding programme, complemented by National Lottery funding.

=== Project Grants ===
National Lottery Project Grants is an open access programme for arts, libraries and museums projects. The fund supports thousands of individual practitioners, community and cultural organisations, distributing funds from the National Lottery. Grants are available from £1,000 to £100,000.. Project Grants is always open for new submissions.

=== Developing Your Creative Practice ===
Funding to support individuals who are cultural and creative practitioners and want to take time to focus on their creative development. Grants are awarded in rounds.

=== National Portfolio Organisations ===
Several hundred National Portfolio Organisations (NPO) and Investment Principles Support Organisations (IPSO) are allocated funding in multi-year tranches to support their on-going programmes. In November 2026, following a meeting convened by the Culture Secretary on abuse in the creative industries, Arts Council England announced that organisations joining its 2028–2033 National Portfolio would be required to register with the Creative Industries Independent Standards Authority as a condition of funding.

=== Former funding programmes ===
==== Culture Recovery Fund ====
In 2020 it administered the Culture Recovery Fund to arts venues and organisations in England affected by the COVID-19 pandemic

==== Arts Capital Lottery ====
From 1994 it oversaw a national capital fund with grants for new buildings, public art and the renovation of existing arts buildings. The story of the Capital programme is told by Prue Skene who chaired the Lottery Panel, in Capital Gains: how the national lottery transformed England's arts.

== Museums ==
Arts Council England supports a limited number of museums as Major Partnership Museums: 16 single museums or consortia were supported 2012–2015, and a further five were added for 2015–2018, bringing the total to 21. Arts Council England also supports other museums via "Strategic Funds."

The council also runs the Designation Scheme for collections in libraries or museums of national or international importance, and is the English partner in the UK Museum Accreditation Scheme.

== Litigation ==
In 2023, a gender critical woman, Denise Fahmy, won a harassment claim against the council at an employment tribunal, which ruled that hostile comments about her beliefs at an internal meeting (which followed the Arts Council funded organisation London Community Foundation granting and then suspending a grant to LGB Alliance), and other activity afterward, constituted "an intimidating, hostile, degrading, humiliating or offensive environment" for employees with such protected beliefs.

== Criticism ==
The council attracted criticism from the Parliamentary select committee responsible for its oversight for supporting a lottery-funded programme to subsidise UK film production that resulted in a series of films that failed to find distribution. There was also a series of costly capital projects such as the Royal Opera House and the Lowry Centre that required additional funding. In the case of the Royal Opera House the select committee found the Arts Council had broken its own procedures. In 2005, it was announced that the Arts Council England's budget was capped resulting in an effective £30m reduction in its budget.

In March 2006, the Arts Council announced a review of its National Office that would "enhance efficiency and delivery while continuing to provide respected and focused arts leadership and drive", while proposing to lose 42 posts, mainly arts specialists, so that the organisation will no longer have dedicated national leads for areas including contemporary music, interdisciplinary art, moving image, architecture, broadcasting, opera, social inclusion, and disability.

Arts Council England's music policy was controversial within the jazz world. Chris Hodgkins, in his 1998 paper Jazz in the UK, pointed out that more than 90% of its music budget went on opera while jazz, with an equivalent audience size, received less than 1%. The funding landscape has improved since with funding for NWJazzworks and Manchester Jazz Festival 2012. Among other areas funding has diversified into youth music such as National Youth Choirs of Great Britain, National Youth Jazz Collective and South Asian Music Youth Orchestra (SAMYO) etc. On 11 May 2006 it was raised in the House of Lords by Lord Colwyn, as documented in the Lords Hansard Columns (1058 to 1060).

In May 2015 the Board of Deputies of British Jews released a statement objecting to Arts Council England's funding of The Siege. The Palestinian play depicts a 2002 incident where armed Hamas fighters sought refuge in Church of the Nativity in Bethlehem. A 39-day siege ensued, and eight of the Hamas troops were killed by Israeli snipers, before the remaining forces surrendered.

The English Touring Opera attributed its firing of white musicians in 2021 to "firm guidance" from the Arts Council.

== Chris Goode & Company funding and safeguarding concerns ==
Chris Goode & Company was funded by Arts Council England as a National Portfolio Organisation for several years. In 2021, its founder and artistic director Chris Goode died by suicide shortly after being arrested for possession of indecent images of children. Following his death, multiple former collaborators came forward with allegations of sexual abuse, coercive control, and non-consensual behaviour during Goode’s time leading the company. Critics later questioned whether Arts Council England had sufficient safeguarding protocols and oversight mechanisms in place to detect or prevent such abuse within funded organisations. Commentators including Lyn Gardner and survivor-led campaigns argued that Goode’s public funding and status in the theatre industry enabled his misconduct to go unchecked for years.

== See also ==
- Creative Partnerships
- Community art
- Artsmark
- Creative Scotland
- Arts Council of Northern Ireland
- Arts Council of Wales
