= Manchester Jazz Festival =

Manchester Jazz Festival is an annual 9-day-long festival focused on showcasing contemporary jazz from the North West of England and beyond.

== History ==
The Manchester Jazz Festival was created in 1996 as a one-day showcase and has grown into a 9-day event, with 60 gigs and 300 musicians planned for July 2009.

Key dates and figures for the festival:

- 1996: First Manchester Jazz Festival – 1 day, 1 venue, 10 bands
- 2000: First new jazz work commissioned by the festival
- 2003: First Manchester Jazz Festival all-day finale in Albert Square, with 5 bands, 50 musicians and 5,000 attenders
- 2006: First jazz festival podcast in the UK – won the Independent's Critics' Choice

== Funders and supporters ==
Manchester Jazz Festival is an Arts Council England's Regularly Funded Organisation since 1999. It is one of Manchester City Council's Pillar Event since 2003. It also regularly receive financial support from the PRS Foundation for New Music to foster new talents and develop new works.

The festival's international programme is supported by the Instituto Cervantes Manchester and the Italian Consulate.

== Commissions ==
From 2000, Manchester Jazz Festival has been commissioning North West artists to help them develop projects. Previously commissioned artists include Richard Iles, Jon Thorne (with Danny Thompson), Stuart McCallum (with John Surman), Mike Walker (with Adam Nussbaum).

In 2008, the festival was allocated an increase in core funding from Arts Council England to develop its commitment to new jazz works and to actively encourage innovative artistic creation on the part of the region's jazz community. This new strand, called "mjf originals", is open to submissions.
