= Robert Elms =

English writer and broadcaster

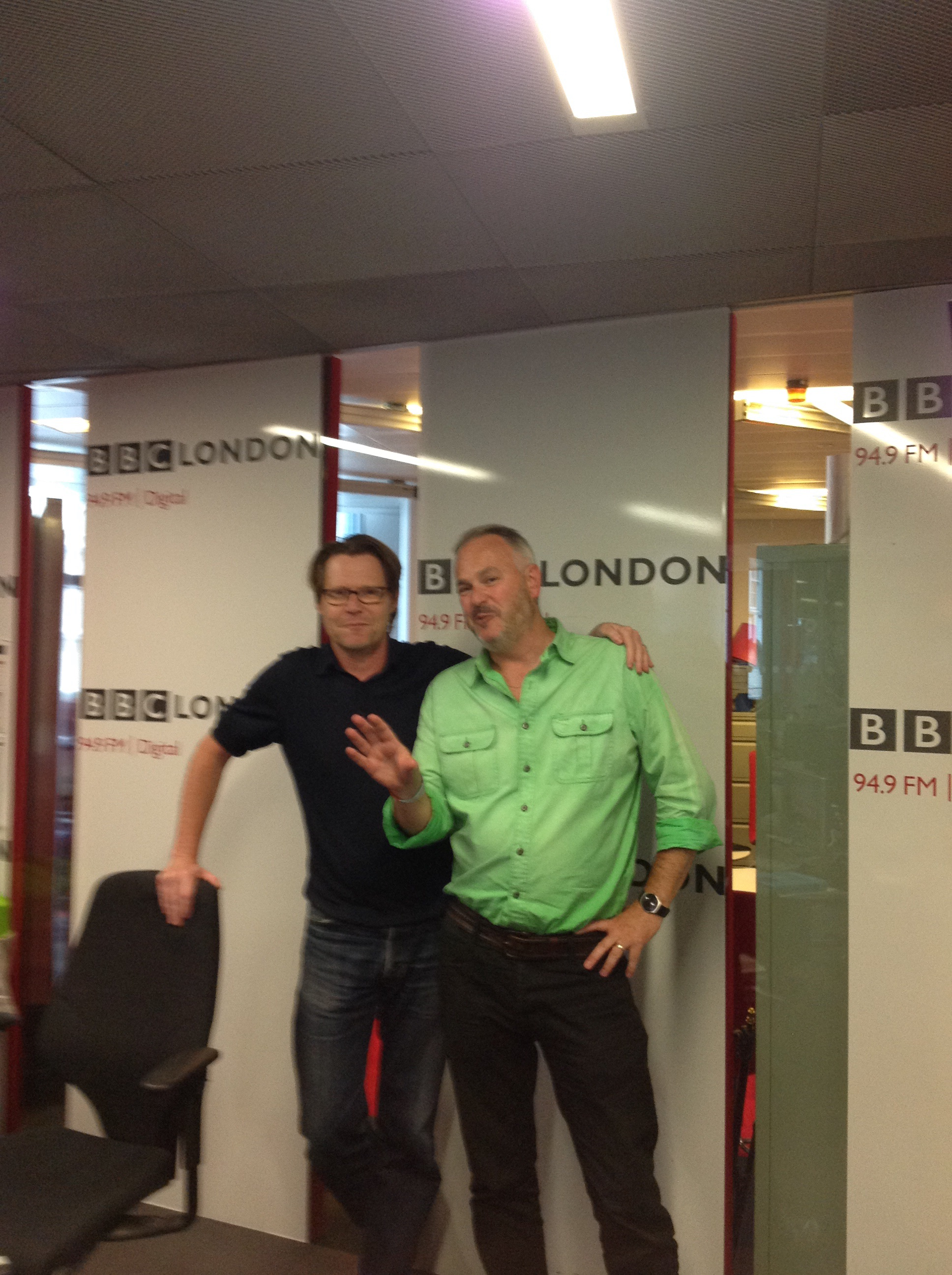
- Elms on the left, with Tim Marshall
- Born: Robert Frederick Elms; 12 June 1959 (age 67); Hendon, London, England
- Education: London School of Economics
- Occupations: Broadcaster, writer

Robert Frederick Elms (born 12 June 1959) is an English writer and broadcaster. Elms was a writer for The Face magazine in the 1980s, and is known for his long-running radio show on BBC Radio London.

== Early life and education ==
Elms was born in Hendon, London, England, and was educated at Orange Hill Grammar School for Boys, a state grammar school in the northwest London suburb of Burnt Oak, after passing the 11-plus examination for state school pupils. From there, Elms studied at the London School of Economics (LSE) in Central London.

== Life and career ==
While still at the LSE, Elms became involved in the "club scene" that was developing in London suburbs. He became a columnist for both The Face and NME, writing on both music and fashion. According to Elms, he was "almost a member" of the band Spandau Ballet. He championed them, having suggested they change their name from Gentry, and introduced the group at early concerts by reciting a verse. Band member Gary Kemp later acknowledged Elms' contribution to the bands name-change and that he had acted as their "spin doctor", and "inspired" songs such as "Chant No. 1 (I Don't Need This Pressure On)", a number 3 UK Singles Chart hit for the band in 1981. Elms also worked as a DJ at clubs including the Palladium in New York.

Elms was a chronicler of the New Romantic movement of the early 1980s, and became a popular interview choice for the broadcast media. Elms then developed a broadcasting career of his own, working in both radio and television. He was a contributor to Loose Ends (BBC Radio 4) and presented the Channel 4 travel series Travelog during the 1990s. In 1989, his first novel, In Search of the Crack was published by Penguin Books.

In 2005, he published The Way We Wore: A Life in Threads, which charts the changing fashions of his own youth, linking them with the social history of the times.

He served as a patron for the Arts Council's Architecture Week, until the demise of the event in 2007.

Since 1994, Elms has presented a radio show on BBC Radio London, in 1999 being referred to as "its top presenter". The show features reports, discussions, and call-ins about Greater London, the history, architecture, geography, city planning and the language of London: in short, the minutiae of the city. Guests who are acknowledged experts in their fields of study appear on a regular basis, including architect Maxwell Hutchinson and film critic Jason Solomons. An extract of the shows is published as a podcast every week. Solomons often covers for Elms when he is on holiday.

Elms is a critic of The Beatles, and refuses to play the band on his BBC London daily radio show. He has been quoted as saying "I just think they are either childlike and simple or rather leaden and pompous – one or the other all the time. For me they turned something that was once sexy and raw and had roots, into something that was totally soulless, playground sing-along music. I think everything that is over-inflated deserves a pin-prick in it occasionally. How can they be above criticism? That's ludicrous."

His memoir, London Made Us, was published in 2019.

At 30 years in 2024, Elms is the longest running presenter on BBC radio for London.

On 25 September 2025, at a ceremony in the Guildhall, Elms received the Freedom of the City of London for his outstanding contribution to the cultural life of London.

In March 2026, Elms was announced by Tomorrow's Warriors – a music education and artist development charity founded in 1991 – as one of the organisation's inaugural patrons, alongside Baroness Amos, Margaret Busby, Guy Chambers, Nick Hornby, Lizzie Ridding and John Ridding, Michael Watt, Richard Wyatt, Femi Koleoso, Eska and Moses Boyd.

== Personal life ==
In the 1980s, Elms squatted with singer Sade Adu in Tottenham.

He is married to Christina Wilson and has three children. The family lived in Camden, an area of London he promotes and where he renovated a Georgian house. In 2021, Elms and his wife moved from Camden to the Barbican Estate in Central London.

== Works ==
- Elms, Robert (1988). In Search of the Crack. Viking. ISBN 978-0-670-82328-4.
- Elms, Robert (1992). Spain, a Portrait After the General. Mandarin. ISBN 978-0-434-22824-9.
- Elms, Robert (2005). The Way We Wore: A Life in Threads. Pan Macmillan. ISBN 978-0-330-42032-7.
- Elms, Robert (2020). London Made Us: A Memoir of a Shape-Shifting City. Canongate Books. ISBN 978-1-78689-213-3.
- Elms, Robert (2023). Live!: Why We Go Out. Unbound Publishing. ISBN 978-1-80018-283-7.
