= Gary Crosby (bassist) =

British jazz musician and educator (born 1955)

Gary Crosby OBE
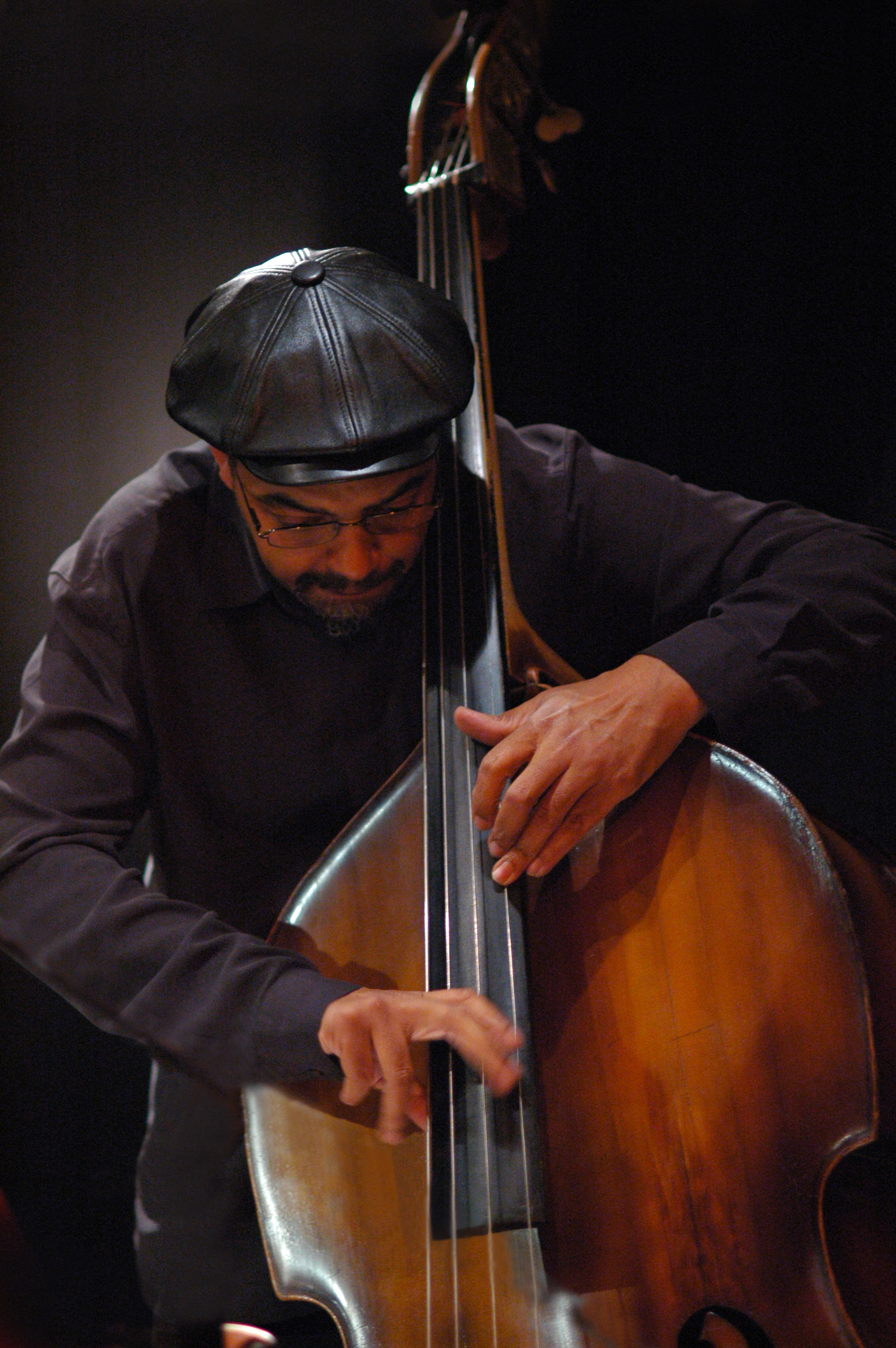
- Crosby in 2006

Background information
- Born: 26 January 1955 (age 71); London, UK
- Genres: Jazz
- Occupations: Musician, arranger, bandleader, educator
- Instrument: Double bass
- Partner: Janine Irons
- Website: garycrosbybass.com

Gary Crosby OBE (born 26 January 1955) is a British jazz double bassist, composer, music arranger, and educator. He was a founding member of the celebrated group the Jazz Warriors in the 1980s and has worked with many top international artists.

Also a bandleader, record producer, company director and facilitator, he leads Gary Crosby's Nu Troop, Jazz Jamaica, Jazz Jamaica All Stars and is the founder of Nu Civilisation Orchestra. Crosby is co-founder and artistic director of Tomorrow's Warriors, a talent development organisation and charity co-founded in 1991 with his partner Janine Irons. In 1996, Crosby and Irons established Dune Music, a company that encompasses artist management, a record label, music publishing, and education.

Crosby appeared in the 1998 Teletubbies episode "Double Bass", where he played his double bass for some children.

Described by the BBC as "a towering figure in jazz", Crosby has been the recipient of many honours, including in 2009 being appointed an OBE for Services to Music, and in 2018 becoming the first jazz musician to be awarded the Queen's Medal for Music.

== Background ==
Crosby was born on 26 January 1955 of Jamaican heritage in London, England. He is the nephew of guitarist Ernest Ranglin, who performed with Jazz Jamaica at Ronnie Scott's Jazz Club in October 2009 as part of the club's anniversary concert series. Before focusing seriously on music, Crosby had ambitions to be an electrical engineer and he worked with a construction company where his role was partly to look after the apprentices. After his starting out playing trumpet, in his teens Crosby studied with noted bassist Peter Ind, going on to become a founding member in 1986 of the Jazz Warriors – a group that showcased such talented young Black musicians as Courtney Pine, Steve Williamson, Cleveland Watkiss, Phillip Bent, and Orphy Robinson.

=== Tomorrow's Warriors ===
In 1991, Crosby established Tomorrow's Warriors, providing a platform for talented young musicians who wished to pursue a career in jazz. Over the following years, the Tomorrow's Warriors Jazz Café Jam Session became an institution and developed four generations of Warriors, including Denys Baptiste, J-Life and Soweto Kinch.

In 2004, the Tomorrow's Warriors Jam Session moved to The Spice of Life in Soho, where it remained active until Summer 2010. Tomorrow's Warriors continues to develop the careers of young musicians and with core programmes and workshops at Southbank Centre, London.

=== Jazz Jamaica ===
In the early 1990s, Crosby set up Jazz Jamaica, a group of Jamaican jazz musicians, in which young musicians played alongside such seasoned talent as ska trombonist Rico Rodriquez and trumpeter Eddie Thornton.

=== Dune Music ===
In 1996, Crosby and his partner, Janine Irons, established The Dune Music Company Ltd, a commercial company comprising four divisions: artist management, record label, music publishing, and education. Artists associated with Dune Music include Jazz Jamaica All Stars, Soweto Kinch, Denys Baptiste, Abram Wilson, Andrew McCormack, Empirical and J-Life.

== Awards and recognition ==
In 1998, Gary Crosby's Nu Troop won the award for Best International Ensemble at the Jazz à Vienne Concours International d’Orchestres in France.

In 2002, Crosby won the award for Best Band for his 20-piece big band, Jazz Jamaica All Stars. In the same year, he was honoured by the Festival Directorate of the Ocho Rios Jazz Festival, Jamaica, for Consistent Contribution to Music in Jamaica, thereby securing a place in the Jamaica Jazz Hall of Fame.

In 2006, Jazz Jamaica was given the All Party Parliamentary Jazz Award for Best Ensemble.

In 2007, Crosby received the BBC Radio Jazz Award for Services to Jazz.

In 2009, Gary Crosby was appointed an OBE in the Queen's Birthday Honours.

In 2012, Crosby received the Parliamentary Award for Jazz Education. Citing Crosby's nomination for the award, presenter Paul Gambaccini said: "Gary has been making his mark as a jazz educator and bass player since 1991 when he formed the group 'Tomorrow’s Warriors' as a platform for young musicians who want to pursue a career in jazz. The ethos is to encourage young people from all backgrounds but there is a positive move to encourage people of the African diaspora. Many women have come through the Warriors' training bands and have now secured places at leading music colleges. Gary Crosby through his organisation and outstanding teaching has achieved in 20 years what many would think would take a lifetime in regards to ethnic minorities and gender imbalances."

In September 2017, Crosby was named by the British Academy of Songwriters, Composers and Authors (BASCA) as one of 12 recipients (including Michael Gibbs, Paulette Long, Emeli Sandé, Martyn Ware and others) of a Gold Badge Award, which celebrates the unique contribution of those who have supported or inspired the UK songwriting and composing community.

In 2018, Crosby was awarded the Queen's Medal for Music – the first jazz musician to receive the honour since it was established in 2005 – which was presented in a special audience at Buckingham Palace on 10 July 2019.

In 2019, Crosby was awarded an Honorary Fellowship by Trinity Laban Conservatoire of Music and Dance.

In 2021, he was awarded an honorary doctorate, "Doctor of Music honoris causa", by the University of London Institute in Paris.

In 2025, Crosby was honoured at the Jazz Café with an event titled "Gary Crosby’s Great Big 70th Birthday Jam".

== See also ==
- List of jazz arrangers
