= Andrew McCormack =

British jazz pianist (born 1978)

- Born: 24 March 1978 (age 48); London, England
- Genre: Jazz
- Occupations: Musician, composer
- Instrument: Piano
- Website: mccormackmusic.com

Andrew McCormack (born 24 March 1978) is a British jazz pianist.

== Biography ==
McCormack recorded his debut album Telescope in 2006 and was awarded BBC Jazz Awards Rising Star in the same year. The London Symphony Orchestra commissioned a piece from him for a Barbican Centre concert in 2009 as part of their Panufnik Young Composers Scheme. Since 2007, he has been a member of Kyle Eastwood's quintet. McCormack's second album, Live in London, was released by Edition in 2012.

McCormack has performed and recorded two albums with saxophonist Jason Yarde.

In 2014, McCormack performed as the Andrew MacCormack Trio with drummer Colin Stranahan and bassist Sam Lasserson.

Reviewing McCormack's 2020 album, Solo, John Fordham described him as "one of UK jazz's most imaginative graduates of the inspirational and inclusive Tomorrow's Warriors education programme", saying that "McCormack's resourcefulness embraces a McCoy Tyner-like percussive power, a knack for giving familiar materials contemporary spins, and an inclination to fastmoving idiomatic scene-shifts within pieces – jazz-improv to baroque counterpoint, for instance."

== Discography ==
- Telescope (Dune, 2005)
- My Duo with Jason Yarde (Joy and Ears, 2009)
- Places and Other Spaces with Jason Yarde (Edition, 2011)
- Live in London (Edition, 2012)
- First Light (Edition, 2014)
- Graviton (Jazz Village, 2017)
- Graviton: The Calling (Ubuntu Music, 2019)
- Solo (Ubuntu Music, 2020)
