= John Fordham (jazz critic) =

British jazz critic

- Occupations: Jazz critic and writer
- Awards: Parliamentary Jazz Awards "Jazz Journalist of the Year"

John Fordham is a British jazz critic and writer. As well as being the main jazz critic for The Guardian, he publishes a monthly column for the newspaper. He is the author of several books on jazz, and has reported on it for publications including Time Out, City Limits, Sounds, Jazz UK and The Wire. He is a former editor of Time Out, City Limits and Jazz UK. He has contributed to documentaries for radio and television, as well as regularly to BBC Radio 3's programme Jazz on 3.

== Awards ==
Fordham has won the Parliamentary Jazz Awards "Jazz Journalist of the Year" award three times since 2005.

== Selected bibliography ==
- 1986: Let's Join Hands and Contact The Living (Elm Tree Books)
- 1989: The Sound of Jazz (Hamlyn)
- 1991: Jazz on CD: the essential guide (Kyle Cathie)
- 1993: Jazz (Dorling Kindersley)
- 1995: Jazzman: Biography of Ronnie Scott (Kyle Cathie)
- 1996: Shooting from the Hip: Changing Tunes in Jazz, 1970-95 (Kyle Cathie)
- 1998: Jazz Heroes (Collins & Brown)
- 1999: Story of Ronnie Scott's: the Making of the Man and the Club That Bears His Name (Showtime)
- 2015: The Knowledge: Jazz (Quadrille, ISBN 9781849496889)
