= Jazz Jamaica =

British jazz/reggae music group

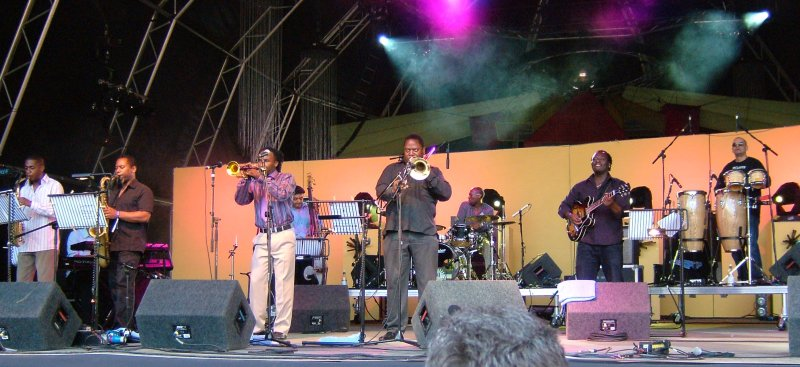
- Performing at the Summer Sundae festival, 2007

Background information
- Origin: London, United Kingdom
- Genres: Ska jazz, reggae
- Years active: 1991–present
- Labels: Hannibal; Dune
- Members: Gary Crosby

Jazz Jamaica is a British jazz/reggae music group founded by musician Gary Crosby in London in 1991.

== History ==
In 1991, inspired by the rhythms of traditional Jamaican music and the largely improvisational nature of jazz, Gary Crosby — one of the original Jazz Warriors, jazz double bassist, and nephew of veteran Jamaican guitarist Ernest Ranglin — conceived a fusion of mento, ska, reggae and jazz styles in playing classic and modern jazz standards alongside Jamaican folksongs. To achieve this, he gathered together a group of musicians drawn from the jazz and reggae circuits, to form Jazz Jamaica.

Since its realisation, Crosby developed the Jazz Jamaica concept by introducing more young jazz musicians, so increasing the size of the pool of "Jazz Jamaicans", and enabling him to extend the boundaries of the music played. Crosby and his musicians are exponents of this musical fusion known as skazz, which has earned global appreciation.

In March 1999, Crosby expanded the core lineup of Jazz Jamaica to formal big-band status by adding a number of guest soloists including Denys Baptiste, Andy Sheppard, Soweto Kinch, Juliet Roberts, Orphy Robinson, Guy Barker, Kevin Robinson, Ashley Slater, Annie Whitehead, and Alex Wilson, resulting in the Jazz Jamaica All Stars, a 20-piece band featuring vocals, five saxophones, four trumpets, and four trombones with a rhythm section of double bass, piano, drums, guitar and percussion.

In 2002, Jazz Jamaica won the best band award at the BBC Jazz Awards.

In 2004, Jazz Jamaica collaborated with Hugh Masekela and a choir of young people for a performance at the Barbican Centre as part of the City of London Festival marking South Africa's 10th anniversary of democracy.

In 2005, they released Motorcity Roots, an album of reworked Motown songs, and toured the UK and Europe in support.

The Independent newspaper described Jazz Jamaica as "one of the UK's leading 'good-time' bands".

== Albums ==
- Skaravan (1993), Skazz Records (original release); Hannibal Records (1996 reissue)
- The Jamaican Beat: Blue Note Blue Beat Vol. 1 (1994), EAU Records
- The Jamaican Beat Vol.2: Jazz Jamaica Plays Blue Note Blue Beats (1995), EAU Records
- Double Barrel (1998), Hannibal Records
- Massive (as "Jazz Jamaica All Stars") (2001), Dune Records
- Motorcity Roots (2005), Dune Records

== Members ==
- Bass, Band Leader: Gary Crosby
- Guitar: Robin Banerjee, Alan Weekes
- Piano, Keyboards: Alex Wilson, Clifton Morrison
- Drums: Rod Youngs, Kenrick Rowe
- Percussion: Tony Uter
- Vibraphone: Orphy Robinson*
- Saxophone: Soweto Kinch, Denys Baptiste, Jason Yarde*, Adam Bishop*, Andy Sheppard*, Michael Rose* Patrick Clahar*, Ray Carless*, Soweto Kinch*, Tony Kofi*, Brian Edwards
- Trombone: Harry Brown, Annie Whitehead*, Ashley Slater*, Barnaby Dickinson*, Dennis Rollins, Fayyaz Virji*, Winston Rollins*, Rico Rodriguez
- Trumpet: Abram Wilson, Claude Deppa*, Colin Graham*, Guy Barker*, Kevin Robinson*, Sean Corby, Eddie Thornton
- Tuba: Andy Grappy*
- Vocals: Juliet Roberts

Members of expanded "Jazz Jamaica All Stars" big band lineup indicated by *
