= Jason Yarde =

British musician and composer (born 1970)

- Born: 1970 (age 55–56); Beckenham, England
- Education: Middlesex University, BA (Hons)
- Genre: Jazz
- Occupations: Musician, composer, arranger, producer, music director
- Instrument: Saxophones
- Formerly of: Jazz Warriors; Tomorrow's Warriors

Jason Yarde (born 1970) is an English jazz saxophonist, composer, arranger, producer and music director. He has worked with a wide range of artists and music ensembles, including Denys Baptiste, The Blind Boys Of Alabama, McCoy Tyner, Andrew Hill, Jack DeJohnette, Hugh Masekela and the London Symphony Orchestra.

== Early life and education ==
Yarde was born in 1970 in Beckenham, England, to Guyanese parents. While still a teenager at school, he began playing alto and soprano saxophone with the Jazz Warriors, and went on to become their music director.

He studied at Middlesex University, obtaining a BA (Hons) in Performance Arts; the degree incorporated a year at William Paterson College, New Jersey, studying orchestration, studio engineering, jazz performance and saxophone under Joe Lovano, Gary Smulyan and Steve Wilson.

== Music career ==
Yarde was member of Anthony Tidd's Quite Sane band, which won the Capital Radio band of the year award in 1992. He has also been associated with Tomorrow's Warriors since it was started, including leading the J-Life quintet, featuring vocalist Julie Dexter.

In 2007, Yarde's work All Souls Seek Joy was premiered by Hugh Masekela and the London Symphony Orchestra at the Barbican Centre.

Yarde's BBC Proms composition Rhythm and Other Fascinations, for piano trio and the BBC Concert Orchestra, won the inaugural BASCA award for Contemporary Jazz Composition in 2009, with the judges describing his work as "innovative, accomplished and entertaining. It achieves that difficult double act of looking back in homage to a bye-gone era and at the same time, achieving a very contemporary vision."

In 2010, Yarde was a recipient of a Paul Hamlyn Foundation Award, "the most generous arts prize in the UK".
