= Abram Wilson =

American jazz musician (1973–2012)

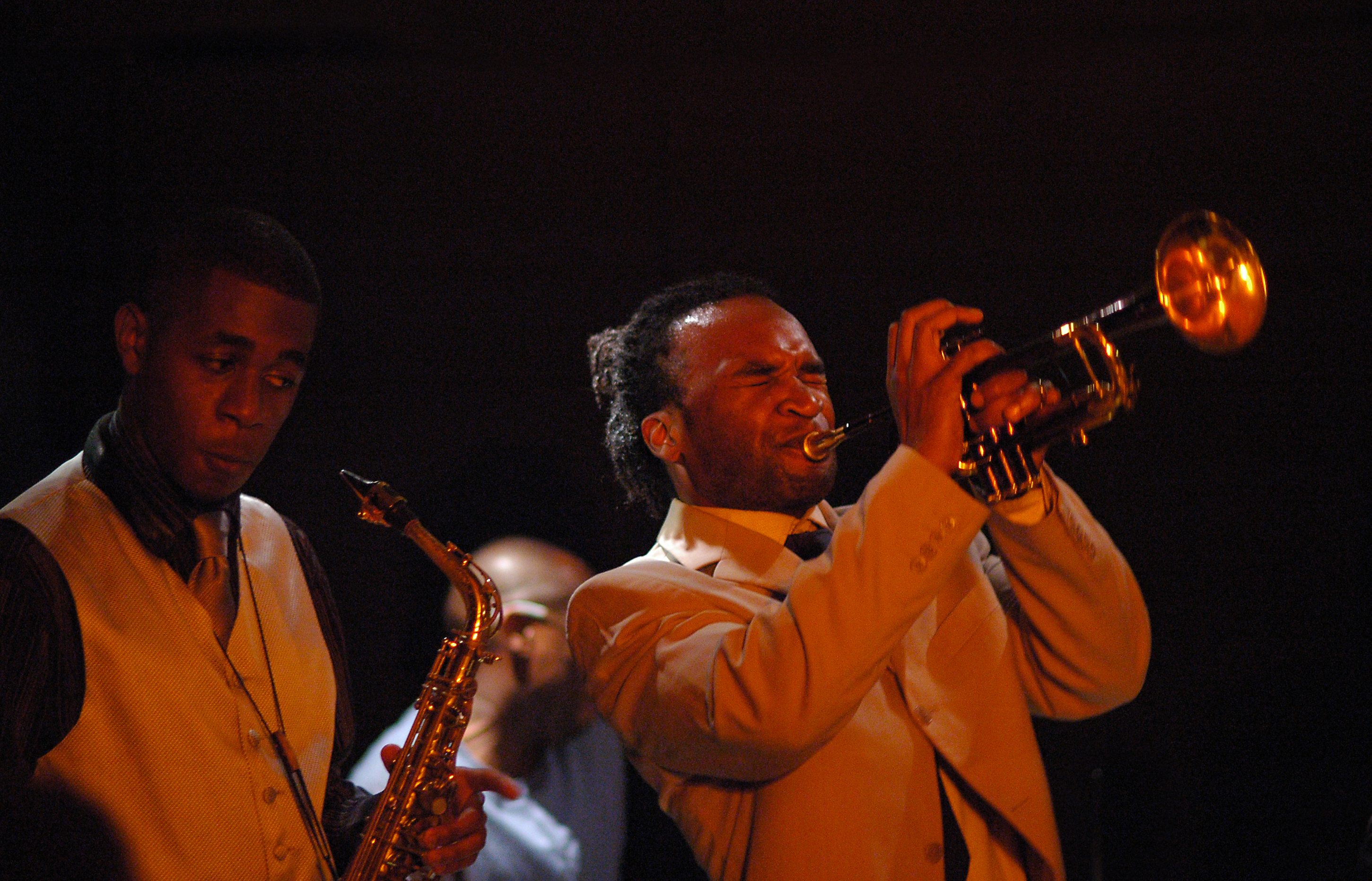
- Nathaniel Facey and Wilson
- Born: August 30, 1973; Fort Smith, Arkansas, U.S.
- Died: June 9, 2012 (aged 38); London, England
- Education: O Perry Walker High School; New Orleans Center for Creative Arts; Ohio Wesleyan University; Eastman School of Music
- Spouse: Jennie Cashman WIlson (m. 2012)
- Musical career
- Genres: Jazz
- Occupations: Jazz trumpeter and vocalist
- Website: abramwilson.com/about/

Abram Wilson (August 30, 1973 – June 9, 2012) was an American jazz trumpeter and vocalist raised in New Orleans and based in London, England, where he also taught music in schools.

== Early life ==
Wilson was born to Willie C. Wilson Jr and his wife Doris in Fort Smith, Arkansas, and had four brothers and one sister. He began playing trumpet at the age of nine, and attended O Perry Walker High School in Louisiana, going on to study at the New Orleans Center for Creative Arts (NOCCA) under the tutelage of Clyde Kerr Jr, Ronald Benko, Dr Burt Breaud, and band director Augustus Walker at O Perry Walker Sr High School.

At 17, Wilson earned a music scholarship to Ohio Wesleyan University, where he studied classical trumpet with Larry Griffin, graduating with a bachelor's degree in music education. He then attained his master's degree at the world-renowned Eastman School of Music in Rochester, New York, studying jazz performance and composition with Ralph Alessi, Mike Cain, and Fred Sturm, and classical trumpet with Barbara Butler.

== Career ==
After graduating from Eastman, Wilson moved to New York, where he started his own band – the Abram Wilson Quintet – as well as regularly performing with the Roy Hargrove Big Band and with rhythm and blues legend Ruth Brown, appearing on her Good Day for the Blues release in 1999.

Arriving in London in 2002, Wilson performed with the Julian Joseph Big Band before meeting the directors of Dune Records (the record label responsible for producing British jazz artists such as Jazz Jamaica, Gary Crosby, Soweto Kinch and Denys Baptiste) and signing in 2003 to the label, where he regularly performed with his fellow label-mates as well as leading his own bands.

From mid-2004, Abram worked in a secondary school in Walthamstow, London, where he taught music for a year until he could work more in his performing career and recording.

In October 2004, Abram launched his career as a solo artist with the release of his debut album for Dune, Jazz Warrior (DUNECD011), to great critical acclaim. He was then commissioned by the Cheltenham Jazz Festival (under the Jerwood Rising Star Programme) and Birmingham Jazz to create an extended work for premiere at the Festival in 2006. This new work entitled Ride! – Ferris Wheel To The Modern Day Delta (DUNECD016) was recorded and released on Dune in April 2007. In late 2011, he left Dune Records.

At the same time, Abram also joined Jazz Jamaica, performing live and appearing on the 2005 album Motorcity Roots.

In 2005, at Nashville's International Songwriting Competition Wilson won first prize in the jazz category for his composition "Monk".

In his later project, Roll Jordan Roll – a tribute to the Fisk Jubilee Singers – he collaborated in 2007 with British gospel legend Nicky Brown and noted gospel historian Viv Broughton. Before his death, Wilson had been working on a composition and recording project based on the life of American pianist Philippa Schuyler.

On June 9, 2012, Wilson at the age of 38 succumbed to colon cancer, having married his long-term partner Jennie (née Cashman) the day before, Friday June 8, 2012.

== Awards and honors ==
- International Songwriting Competition, Best Jazz Composition 2005
- British Jazz Awards, Best New CD 2007
- BBC Jazz Award – Best Band 2005 (Nominated)
- MOBO Award – Best Jazz Act 2005 & 2007 (Nominated)
- BBC Jazz Award – Best Album 2007 (Nominated)
- BBC Jazz Award – Heart of Jazz 2007 (Nominated)

== Discography ==
=== As leader ===
- Soul Vibe (2000, Bleekstar Records)
- Jazz Warrior (2005, Dune Records)
- Ride! – Ferris Wheel To The Modern Day Delta (2007, Dune Records)
- Life Paintings (2009, Dune Records)

=== As guest ===
- Good Day for the Blues – Ruth Brown (1999, Bullseye Blues)
- Conversations With The Unseen – Soweto Kinch (2003, Dune Records)
- Let Freedom Ring! - Denys Baptiste (2003, Dune Records)
- Motorcity Roots – Jazz Jamaica (2005, Dune Records)
- A Life In The Day Of B19: Tales of the Tower Block – Soweto Kinch (2006, Dune Records)
