= Denys Baptiste =

English jazz musician (born 1969)

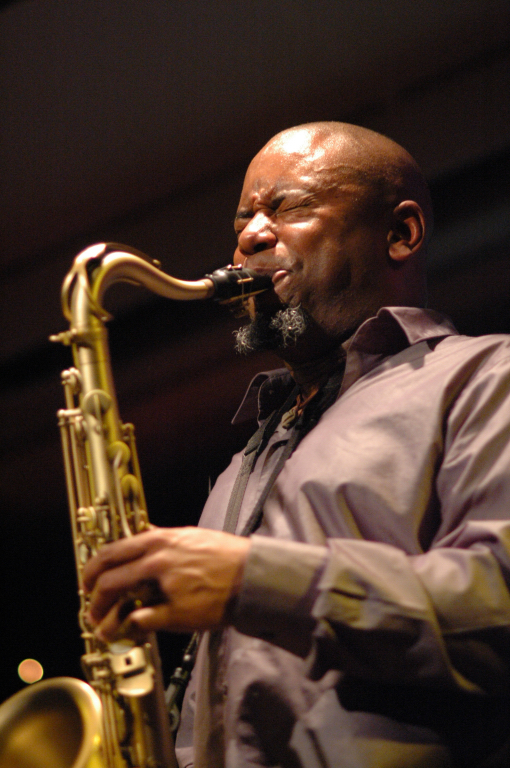
- Baptiste in 2005

Background information
- Born: 1969 (age 56–57); London, England
- Genres: Jazz
- Occupation: Musician
- Instrument: Saxophone
- Formerly of: Tomorrow's Warriors; Nu Troop
- Website: denysbaptiste.com

Denys Baptiste (born 1969) is an English jazz musician. A graduate of Tomorrow's Warriors, Baptiste plays tenor and soprano saxophone in addition to composing.

Baptiste played with Gary Crosby and Nu Troop, before releasing in 1999 his debut album Be Where You Are, which was nominated for a Mercury Music Prize and won the MOBO award for Best Jazz Act 1999. Baptiste's third album Let Freedom Ring! was nominated for the MOBO award for Best Jazz Act 2004, the BBC Jazz Awards for Best New Work and Best Album 2004, and the Parliamentary Jazz Award for Best Album 2004.

As a soloist, Baptiste has recorded and played with many prominent international musicians, including McCoy Tyner, Ernest Ranglin, Bheki Mseleku, Marvin "Smitty" Smith, Michael Bowie, Courtney Pine, Manu Dibango, Steve Williamson, Julian Joseph, Jason Rebello, Lonnie Plaxico, Ralph Moore, Billy Higgins, Jerry Dammers, Jean Carne, Marlena Shaw, Juliet Roberts, and Jazz Jamaica.

== Background ==
Baptiste was born to St Lucian parents in Hounslow, west London, in 1969. Studying music at school from the age of 13, he went on to attend the West London Institute of Higher Education (now integrated into Brunel University) in 1990, then in 1992 continued his music education at the Guildhall School of Music, studying under Jean Toussaint.

Described as "one of the true heavyweights of UK jazz", Baptiste joined Gary Crosby Nu Troop and was nurtured by the Tomorrow's Warriors programme, from where many other emerging stars on the London scene graduated. In 1999, Baptiste's debut album was released to much acclaim, earning him a Mercury Prize nomination (the only jazz record to be shortlisted), and winning him the MOBO award for Best Jazz Act. In 2000, he won the British Jazz Award for Rising Star, releasing his second album, Alternating Currents, in 2001. This was followed in 2003 by Let Freedom Ring! – commemorating the 40th anniversary of Dr Martin Luther King's "I Have A Dream" oration – which earned Baptiste nominations for Best Album and Best New Work in the BBC Jazz Awards, for Best Jazz Act in the MOBO Awards, and Best Album in the Parliamentary Jazz Awards. In 2011, Baptiste's fourth album, Identity By Subtraction, was released, described in Jazzwise as "a robust and absorbing statement from one of the UK's finest young saxophonists."

Baptiste's most recent album, The Late Trane, released in 2017 to mark 50 years since the death of John Coltrane, was positively and widely welcomed, earning many four-star reviews. As noted by the reviewer for London Jazz News, "Baptiste may record infrequently (this only his fifth album in 18 years), but the quality, commitment and emotional impact leap out from the speakers."

Among other praise accorded to Baptiste, AllAboutJazz observes: "His colossal talent – based on a powerful technique and an ability to improvise fluently and effortlessly across a wide range of musical styles – is matched only by his unfettered energy which takes him and his audiences into the musical stratosphere. An evening with Denys guarantees a display of unsuppressed expression, ranging from sweet 'saxuality' to breathtaking, edge-of-your-seat virtuosity."

== Discography ==
- Be Where You Are (Dune Records, 1999)
- Alternating Currents (Dune, 2001)
- Let Freedom Ring! (Dune, 2003)
- Identity By Subtraction (Dune, 2011)
- The Late Trane (Edition, 2017)

== See also ==
- Tomorrow's Warriors
