= Malik Al Nasir =

British author and poet

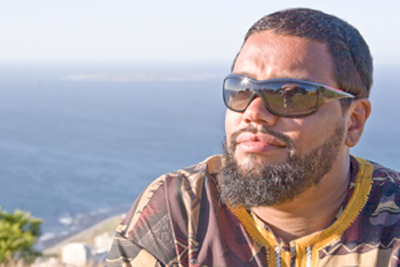
- Born: Liverpool, England
- Citizenship: United Kingdom
- Education: Liverpool Hope University (BA Hons); Liverpool John Moores University (MA); The University of Liverpool (PgDip)
- Occupations: Writer, poet

Malik Al Nasir is a British author and performance poet. He is the leader of the band Malik & the O.G's. Spurred by an interest in the early black footballer Andrew Watson, he began to research his family ancestry, claiming he was related to Watson.

== Early life ==
Al Nasir was born in Liverpool, England in 1966, one of four siblings to a white Welsh mother and a black Guyanese father. Liverpool had one of Britain’s oldest Black communities, with roots stretching back over 200 years through maritime trade. During the 1960s and 1970s, the city experienced severe economic decline, with mass unemployment, deteriorating housing, and rising poverty. Black and mixed-race residents faced systemic racism and discrimination in employment, housing, and daily life.

His father worked as a merchant seaman and security guard; his mother worked in a factory. When he was nine years old, his father was paralysed by a stroke and he was expelled from school. The local authority placed him into care, where he suffered racism, brutality and neglect from staff until his release at age 18, destitute and semi-literate.

Years later, he successfully sued the local authority for the abuse he endured in care, receiving a substantial payout and a public apology from the Lord Mayor of Liverpool. The litigation took ten years, during which he pursued educational qualifications to research his own case. He was represented by Allan Levy QC, a noted children’s advocate who co-chaired the 1990-1991 public inquiry into pin-down, a punitive regime used in children's homes.

== Poetry ==
At 18, he met poet and activist Gil Scott-Heron, an African-American performing artist, who had a profound effect on his life. Scott-Heron was an part of the Black Arts Movement and was best-known for the song "The Revolution Will Not Be Televised". (His father, Gil Heron, was, like Andrew Watson, a footballer of Caribbean origin who played in Scotland). Gil Scott-Heron supported Malik over many years, encouraging him to learn to read fluently and to write poetry, and develop his understanding of Black consciousness.

=== Recordings, publications, and media production ===
Eventually Watson compiled the writings of his late teens and twenties, both poems and explanatory prose, into a book entitled Ordinary Guy. It was released in 2004 by Fore-Word Press, the publishing house he had founded. The book was written in tribute to Scott-Heron & The Last Poets, and includes a foreword by Jalal Mansur Nuriddin.

In 2006, Al Nasir co-founded Dubai-based production company MediaCPR and its record label MCPR Music. Conceptually MediaCPR wanted to develop clean content in mainstream music, that could entertain listeners without being offensive or explicit. Malik and his team of music producers pioneered a new genre of music which they called "Drum Fusion". The idea was to unite traditional rhythms with contemporary song arrangements and apply positive lyrical content to produce a new style of music, which could be applied to any genre. The drum fusion formula involves developing a full organic sound composition derived exclusively from the use of drum, percussion, the human voice and natural sounds such as wind, rain, running water etc.

The first album released using this formula was Drumquestra (2009), by Jamaican master percussionist Larry McDonald (percussionist), who wanted to showcase his 50-year recording career. The concept was developed collaboratively between Al Nasir, as executive producer, Larry McDonald, and producer Sidney Mills from Steel Pulse. One of the tracks, Set the Children Free, was recorded for the album by Toots & the Maytals. A dance remix by Lenny B demonstrated that the "Drum Fusion" formula could cross genres and be relevant to the young, as well as the old traditionalists. Al Nasir co-wrote two tracks on Drumquestra: "Peace of Mind" (which he co-produced with Sidney Mills featuring Shaza) and and "Crime Or Music" (featuring veteran ska musician Stranger Cole and reggae drummer Sly Dunbar). Additional percussion on this track was provided by Sticky Thompson of The Wailers and Bongo Herman.

Al Nasir featured in Word Up – From Ghetto to Mecca (2011), a documentary about performance poetry. It was produced by UKTV's commissioning editor Shirani Sabaratnam and included Scott-Heron, The Last Poets and Benjamin Zephaniah. Fore-Word Press screened the film at the Phoenix Cinema, Leicester, as part of the 2011 Black History Month events, sponsored by Leicester City Council.

Al Nasir wrote and produced two albums of his poetry and songs, Rhythms of the Diaspora Vol. 1 & 2, 2015, featuring Scott-Heron, The Last Poets, LL Cool J, Stanley Clarke, Swiss Chris, Rod Youngs, Larry McDonald, and Ms Marie Labropolus. The albums were recorded at Sarm Studios in Reading, Mercredi 9 Studios in Paris and Wyclef Jean's Platinum Sound Recording Studios in New York. Mixed by Serge Tsai and mastered by Chris Gehringer at Sterling Sound New York.

== Education ==
Al Nasir has studied at three universities in Liverpool. In 2010, he graduated with an MA in New Media Production from Liverpool Screen School, a faculty of Liverpool John Moores University. For his thesis piece he created a web-based multimedia software program for genealogical family tree building, called Ancestory but has no link to the programme of a similar name which was developed in the USA.

In 1996, Al Nasir graduated Liverpool Hope University with a BA Hons, and in 2010 he graduated The University of Liverpool with a PgDip.

=== Research ===
==== Football ====
Malik has researched the life of Andrew Watson (24 May 1856 – 8 March 1921) who was the world’s first Black international footballer and one of the architects of the game of soccer as it is known today. Watson came from British Guiana in 1860, and went on to play for the Scottish national team.

Al Nasir's father was born Reginald Wilcox July and only later adopted his father's surname of Watson. His marriage certificate shows his mother as Olivia July and his father as George Edward Watson. Al Nasir was consulted on the development of (and featured in) the BBC Scotland documentary entitled "Mark Walters in the Footsteps of Andrew Watson".

==== Mercantile families ====
In 2020 Al Nasir matriculated at St Catharine's College, Cambridge, where he began a PhD in history. As at 2024 Al Nasir is a "4th Yr PhD Candidate" at the University of Cambridge. His thesis is entitled "Kinship Networks and Mercantile Hegemony in the Latter Days of British Slavery – The Case of Sandbach Tinne".

Al Nasir's research into Sandbach, Tinne & Company came to public attention in connection with a BBC article entitled "Searching for my Slave Roots" which went viral and led in 2022 to art works related to the Sandbach family in the Walker Art Gallery, Liverpool, being recontextualised in light of the revelations of the collection's links to slavery. Al Nasir's findings about the kinship links of mercantile families received further attention in 2023 when Antoinette Sandbach sparked a controversy regarding a TedX Talk, "Searching for my slave roots", given back in 2021. In an interview on LBC, Al Nasir stated that Ms Sandbach, a former MP, had complained to the University of Cambridge asking for her name to be removed from the Tedx talk (which the university had embedded in an article about Al Nasir's research). After an investigation, the university rejected her claims on the grounds of academic freedom. Sandbach then made a GDPR complaint citing 'Right to be forgotten'. This claim was also rejected and she was instructed that she had misread the legislation. The matter was raised in Parliament as a point of order where the MP Dawn Butler referred to Al Nasir's mention of the former MP. She asked "Can you please clarify whether it is in order for Members of Parliament to ask for their family history to be forgotten? The family of former MP for Eddisbury Antoinette Sandbach were deeply involved in the slave trade and amassed wealth as a result of this brutality. The former Member has threatened the University of Cambridge with legal action after an historian spoke of her ancestors’ role in the slave trade. While her recent public apology for their role is welcome and necessary, those who sit in this House should not use their position to silence those who shine a light on the horrors of the past."

Sandbach's initial complaint was that Al Nasir had said she lived in Wales in the TedX talk when in fact she did not and she demanded correction on the TedX talk. A correction was added at her request by the publisher which cited the Welsh property that she had left in 2015. Al Nasir was not the publisher but merely the subject of the talk. Sandbach then began citing privacy concerns, the former MP complained to the University of Cambridge, which had embedded the talk on its website and her claims were again dismissed on the grounds of academic freedom. She began to state that she had received death threats which some news outlets interpreted as being as a result of Al Nasir's research. This was debunked upon investigation by The Voice, who determined that the threats she referred to had nothing to do with Al Nasir research and were as a result of her stance on Brexit. This was both prior to the TedX talk and prior to Al Nasr's arrival in Cambridge. The Press Association later published a correction and Sandbach was forced to clarify this in a correction to a Guardian article which added a footnote on 6 September 2023.

In a BBC Newsnight interview, Al Nasir explained that her ancestral links to Samuel Sandbach were a footnote to his research, and that he did not release personal details but simply wanted to demonstrate that the family still enjoyed political influence.

In an interview with Tom Swarbrick on LBC radio on 1 September 2023 Al Nasir confirmed the University of Cambridge had been compelled to disclose legal correspondence to him, as Ms Sandbach had threatened legal action against him as well as the university. He did not release the address of Sandbach as such, however her allegation against him included a complaint that he mentioned in his TedxTalk that she "still lived on land passed down from Samuel Sandbach", referring to the family's Hafodunos estate in Denbighshire. She claimed this was untrue, because she'd moved from Wales to Cheshire in 2015 (and thus could not have been put at risk in 2022 as she had also claimed). Al Nasir rejected claims made by Sandbach against him regarding her personal safety, as they were unrelated, having occurred before Al Nasir recorded the TedX talk.

Public funding has been received from the ESRC to digitise records collected by Al Nasir which are under development and will soon be made available to the public via Cambridge Digital Library. Cambridge University confirmed in 2022 that the records had been digitised but they remain inaccessible to the public. whilst under development.

In 2023 a conference at the University of Bristol explored the extent of the Sandbach family's involvement in transatlantic slavery and the sources of their wealth and power. The Sandbach Tinne Conference brought together researchers from the UK and the USA to explore the vast wealth accumulated by the Sandbach Tinne dynasty, and how best to bring the related archival collections into the public domain in a way that was accessible through 'The Sandbach Tinne Project'. Attendees were able to use VR headsets to experience a demonstration, developed by University of Cambridge Library Services and Bristol Digital Futures Institute at University of Bristol, of a virtual museum of Sandbach Tinne artefacts.

== Recognition ==
In 2022 Malik was awarded a Sydney Smith Memorial Prize by St Catharine's College, Cambridge "In recognition of his outstanding achievement and contribution to the artistic and literary life of the College".

On 4 May 2023, Malik was presented with the University of Cambridge Vice-Chancellor’s Global Social Impact Award

He also won the 2023 Cambridge Student Award with Rhiannon Llystyn Jones from St John’s College Cambridge for their contributions to access and widening participation.

=== 2024 ===
In 2024, University of Glasgow awarded Al Nasir a Library Fellowship.

On 19 June 2024, Al Nasir received the Cambridge Society for the Application of Research (CSAR) Award "In recognition of outstanding research and potential". The ceremony was held at Churchill College Cambridge on the 60th anniversary of the organisation that was founded by Sir John Cockcroft (the Nobel Prize winning physicist who first split the atom and who was the first Master of Churchill College Cambridge).

In July 2024, he was awarded an honorary Doctor of Letters degree by Liverpool Hope University in recognition of his literary work, including his contribution to the study of Liverpool's links with slavery and his memoir, Letters to Gil.

== Literary works ==
- Al Nasir, M. *Letters to Gil. A memoir. Foreword by Lemn Sissay. William Collins. 2021.

== Co Authored Works ==
- Sherae, L., Al Nasir, A. M. (2024). ‘Barriers to Black Academia - Slavery, Colonialism and the Case for Reparative Justice’ Online Symposia Analytical Report for Roundtable, ed. Vaughn, L., Al Nasir, A. M., Loy, R., Fore-Word Press. Black Academia Series, Vol. 1, pp. 1–40.
- Vaughn, L., Al Nasir, A. M. (2024) ‘Lifting the Barriers to Black Academia - Creating Sustainable Actions for Reparative Justice in Higher Education Institutes'. Policy Briefing, Bristol University Press.

== Co Edited Works ==
- Sherae, L., Jones, R.L. (2024). ‘Lifting the Barriers to Black Academia through Decolonisation and Positive Action’ Policy Roundtable Report, ed. Vaughn, L., Al Nasir, A. M., Loy, R., Fore-Word Press. Black Academia Series, Vol. 2, pp. 1–92.

== Media work ==
Al Nasir wrote The Guardian obituary for Jalal Mansur Nuriddin, entitled "The grandfather of rap".

== Event producer and performer ==
Al Nasir formed a band named Malik & the O.G's, standing for "Ordinary Guys". The band included Malik Al Nasir, Orphy Robinson, Rod Youngs, Mohammed Nazam, Paislie Reid, Shaza Tiago Coimbra and engineer Tom Parker.

In 2013, Al Nasir and his publishing house were asked to produce a live show of the world's first rap album Hustlers Convention. The event, at the Jazz Cafe in Camden, North London, was filmed for the making of a documentary of the same name. The film was directed by Mike Todd of Riverhorse TV and executive produced by Public Enemy's Chuck D. The live event was sponsored by Charly Records, who re-issuesd the album to commemorate both 40 years of "The Hustlers Convention" and 40 years of the company. Malik was the associate producer of the film, as well as an interviewee, presenting a segment to camera. Malik & the O.G's (Cleveland Watkiss, Orphy Robinson, Rod Youngs & Hawi Gondwe) supported Jalal and The Jazz Warriors International Collective at the event.

The death of his mentor, Gil Scott-Heron, led Al Nasir to perform acts of tribute, such as at Liverpool International Music Festival 2013. Two years later, the Festival commissioned him to produce a range of events, including its opening night. On UNESCO International Day for the Remembrance of the Slave Trade and its Abolition he produced "Poets Against Apartheid" at the International Slavery Museum, featuring readings from Tayo Aluko, Jean Binta Breeze MBE, and the Incognito Gospel Choir. A few days later at St George's Hall, Liverpool, he produced, in partnership with nightclub entrepreneur and promoter Richard McGinnis, "The Revolution Will Be Live – A Tribute to Gil Scott-Heron". The MC was BBC Radio Merseyside presenter Ngunan Adamu, and the show featured Al Nasir's own band, Malik & the O.G's, as well as Talib Kweli, Aswad, The Christians, Craig Charles, DJ 2Kind, Sophia Ben-Yousef, and Cleveland Watkiss.

Al Nasir was invited to tour Canada with Last Poets founder member Jalal Mansur Nuriddin for Black History Month (February 2016). Events at Harbourfront in Toronto reached the national press The pair screened two films,Hustlers Convention and Word-Up, and participated in workshops, seminars, school visits and performances in Toronto Ottawa and Mississauga.

Al Nasir was invited back in March 2016 further promoting his film Word-Up and performing with his band Malik & the O.G's featuring Ottawa R & B artists Rita Carter. 'The Revolution Will Be Live' again toured the UK in Nov 2017 with Scott-Heron's former musical director Kim Jordan joining Malik & the O.G's and featured Canadian singer Rita Carter.

== Radio appearances ==
- "Outlook" BBC World Service – "After the death of legendary musician Gil Scott-Heron, we find out how he transformed the life of a young British man."
- "Radio WBAI New York" – 'Radio interview Malik Al Nasir, Bilal Sunni Ali and Tommy Abney with Umar Ben Hassan of The Last Poets'
- "Saturday Live BBC Radio 4 London" – 'Radio interview – Malik Al Nasir, Al Jarreau and Brian Ball with Clare Balding- live from Centre Court at Wimbledon'
- "Roger Phillips Show" BBC Radio Merseyside Malik talks about his life with Gil Scott-Heron & The Last Poets
- "Benji B", BBC Radio 1Xtra "Gone too soon" with KRS-One, Nas and Shabazz Palaces

== Filmography ==
- "Word Up – From Ghetto To Mecca" featuring Gil Scott-Heron, The Last Poets, Malik Al Nasir and Benjamin Zephaniah.
- "Africa" – Malik & the O.G's featuring Rod Youngs, and Larry McDonald (percussionist). – Music Video, produced by HQ Creative and directed by Mitchel Stuart for MCPR Music.
- "BBC News – Toxteth Riots" Malik Al Nasir's social commentary on the Toxteth Riots of 1981 and 2011.
- "Hustlers Convention" – Featuring Chuck D, Melle Mel, Alan Douglas, Ron Saint Germain, Malik Al Nasir, Fab Five Freddy, Last Poets by Producer and Director Mike Todd of Riverhorse TV in Manchester UK. 2014
- "Who Is Gil Scott-Heron?" – Featuring Kimberley Jordan, Glen Turner, Richard Russell (XL Recordings), Jamie Byng, Malik Al Nasir. Producer and Director Iain Forsyth and Jane Pollard for Beggars Banquet UK. 2015

== Discography ==
- Drumquestra by Larry McDonald (percussionist) 2009 for MCPR Music. Tracks "Crime or Music"was written by Malik Al Nasir for Larry McDonald (percussionist) with Squiddly Cole, performed by Ska veteran Stranger Cole and Sly Dunbar. Also "Peace of Mind" was written by Malik Al Nasir & Bobby Rodell Davis. Malik Al Nasir was also Executive Producer for the whole album, Ft. Sly Dunbar, Stranger Cole, Steel Pulse, The Wailers, Dollarman, Bongo Herman, Mutabaruka, Toots & the Maytals, Bob Andy Marivaldo Dos Santos and JD Smooth.
- Rhythms of the Diaspora Vol 1. by Malik & the O.G's – Written and produced by Malik Al Nasir. Ft. Gil Scott-Heron, LL Cool J, Ms Marie Labropoulos.
- Rhythms of the Diaspora Vol 2. by Malik & the O.G's – Written and produced by Malik Al Nasir. Co produced by Swiss Chris, Ft. Larry McDonald (percussionist), Stanley Clarke, The Last Poets.
- Urban Griot by Raw UnLtd. Ft. Hard City Klick HCK – Unreleased. Tracks such as Multi-Media were co-written by Malik Al Nasir. Malik was also the executive producer of the album. The producer was Lloyd Masset. The album was recorded at Hookend Recording Studios in Oxfordshire and mixed by Andy Grassi at Wyclef Jeans Platinum Sound Recording Studios in NYC.

=== Collaboration albums ===
Year	Album	Label	Artist
2008	Urban Griot	MCPR Music Unreleased	Raw UnLtd
2009	Drumquestra (Cat No. CPLM301)	MCPR Music	Larry McDonald

=== Discography ===
Year	Album	Label	Artist
2015	Rhythms of the Diaspora Vol 1. (2 disc Cat No. Mentis001)	MentiS Records	Malik & the O.G's Ft. Gil Scott-Heron
2015	Rhythms of the Diaspora Vol 2. (2 disc Cat No. Mentis001)	MentiS Records	Malik & the O.G's Ft. The Last Poets
2017	Africa EP (CD Cat No. Mentis002)	MentiS Records	Malik & the O.G's
