= Orphy Robinson =

British jazz musician and composer (born 1960)

Orphy Robinson MBE
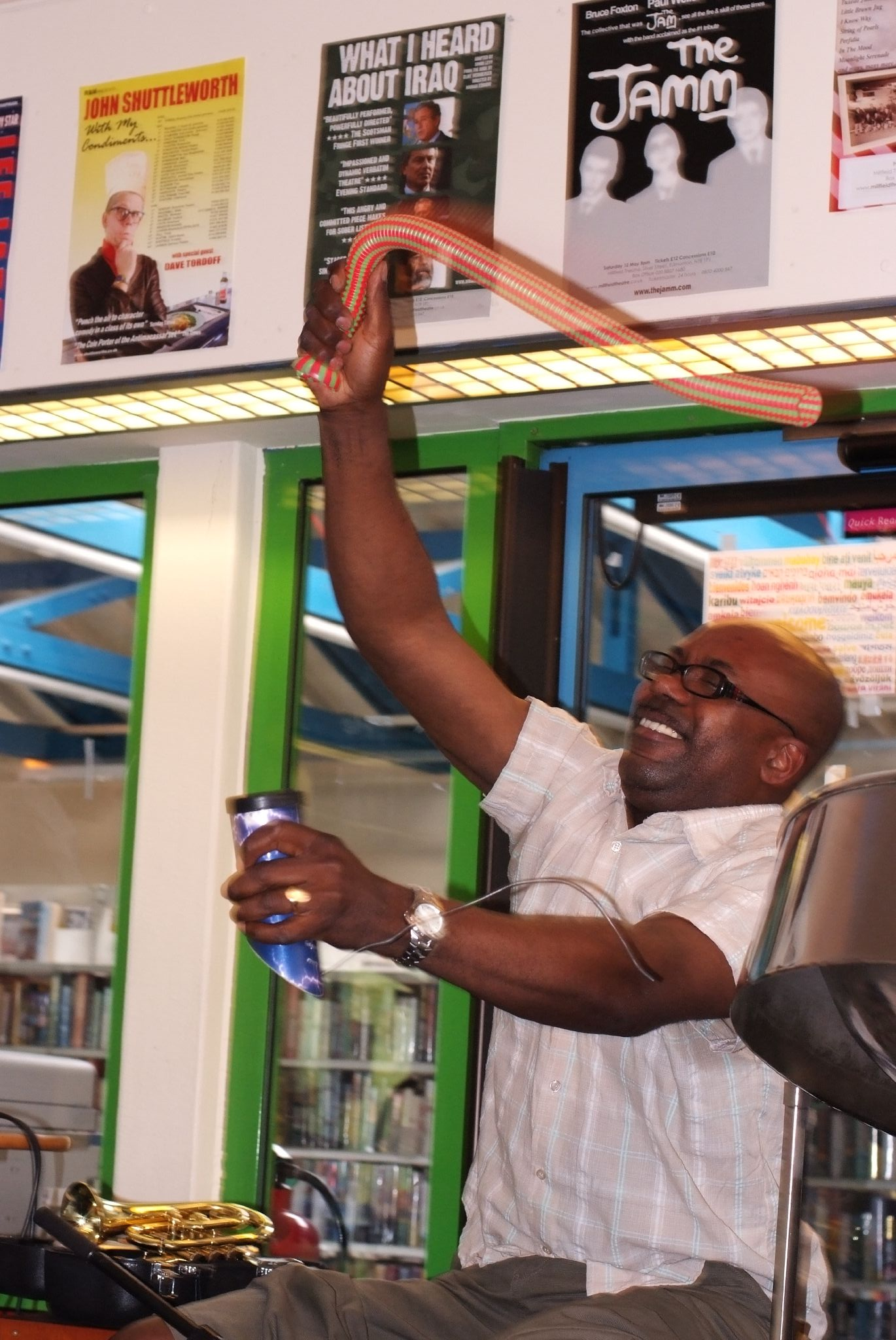

Background information
- Born: Orphy Everton Robinson; 13 October 1960 (age 65); London, England
- Genres: Jazz
- Occupations: Musician, composer, educator
- Instruments: Vibraphone, marimba
- Years active: 1980–present
- Labels: Blue Note, Babel Label
- Website: www.thecentreofattention.co.uk

Orphy Robinson MBE (born 13 October 1960) is a British jazz multi-instrumentalist who plays vibraphone, keyboards, saxophone, trumpet, piano, marimba, steelpans and drums. He has written music for television, film and theatre.

== Career ==
Robinson began his professional career with the band Savanna in the late 1970s. During the mid- to late-1980s, he was a member of the Jazz Warriors with Courtney Pine, and worked with Mica Paris and Andy Sheppard.

In the 1990s, Robinson released two critically acclaimed solo albums: When Tomorrow Comes (1993) and The Vibes Describes (1994). He has recorded as a guest musician and has toured with Hugh Hopper and Robert Wyatt.

For the UK celebration of the bicentenary of the Abolition of the Slave Trade Act in 2007, Robinson was commissioned to write and perform pieces from his suite Routes Through Roots in the Houses of Parliament. He was commissioned by the Phoenix Dance company to write 42 Shades of Black. In June 2014, he was commissioned to write a suite for the combined Shivanova and Ignite ensembles for the 2014 Women's Festival at Kings Place in the UK. He has written for The Proms at the Royal Albert Hall and for the Romanian violin virtuoso Alexander Balanescu.

During 2009, several albums featured Robinson as guest soloist, including No Now Is So! by the Alexander Hawkins ensemble, Out of Office by the Burn Out Mama band from Finland, and albums by Louis Moholo, Leee John and Beggar & Co. Since late 2009, Robinson has been a featured soloist on marimba and vibraphone with the violinist Nigel Kennedy, performing an extensive repertoire including Johann Sebastian Bach, Antonio Vivaldi's The Four Seasons, Jimi Hendrix and Duke Ellington. Robinson has performed as guest musician on three albums with Kennedy: The Four Elements (2011), Vivaldi: The New Four Seasons (2015) and My World (2016).

In the latter part of 2009, he was invited to become musical director of a large ensemble at The Roundhouse with the drummer Nick Mason of Pink Floyd. The duo Black Top was formed in 2011 with the Free Improv pianist Pat Thomas. An album entitled #One was released internationally in July 2014 on the Babel Label, with guest saxophonist Steve Williamson. The second Black Top album, #Two, had Evan Parker as guest.

Robinson started The Spontaneous Cosmic RawXtra ensemble at the Kings Place concert venue in October 2009. The ensemble was included in Black British Jazz (2014), an Open University book by Jason Toynbee. A DVD and recording were released in 2015.

Robinson was instrumental in the formation of the band Malik & the O.G's with band leader Malik Al Nasir and also in his tribute to Gil Scott-Heron at St George's Hall, Liverpool, entitled The Revolution Will Be Live!

Robinson has worked with Lester Bowie, Don Cherry, Neneh Cherry, Junior Giscombe, Kate Havnevik, Imagination, Lionel Loueke, Wynton Marsalis, Hugh Masekela, Jean-Paul "Bluey" Maunick, Joe McPhee, Thurston Moore, Butch Morris, David Murray, Sunny Murray, Mica Paris, Robert Plant, Wadada Leo Smith, Spring Heel Jack, Joss Stone, Jamaaladeen Tacuma, John Tchicai, Kenny Thomas and Nana Vasconcelos.

=== Other work ===
Robinson represented Great Britain at the 1996 Summer Olympics in Atlanta, Georgia. He has worked in schools and on large-scale education projects, including at the Hackney Empire, where he led the Music Education department for more than ten years. He has been on the board of The Vortex jazz club, Warriors International, the National Youth Jazz Orchestra, the British Academy of Songwriters, Composers and Authors and the Participation and Learning Education advisory board at the Hackney Empire.

Robinson is a founding member of Edge (The Shape of Things to Come), a group of artists, writers and promoters curating events pitched as a fringe to the London Jazz Festival. Due to the success of their first programme, titled Edge 08, Robinson and the journalist Paul Bradshaw continued to curate events internationally as well as all-year round events in the UK. Their project Love Supreme Reimagined, a homage to the 1965 John Coltrane album A Love Supreme, a large-scale ensemble with Robinson in the role of musical director, received critical acclaim at the 2014 Southbank Centre's Meltdown Festival curated by James Lavelle.

Robinson produced Carleen Anderson's album Cage Street Memorial (2016). In 2017, Anderson was nominated as Best Jazz Vocalist at the Jazz FM Awards . In 2018, the album was nominated in the Jazz Innovation category at the same awards.

== Awards and honours ==
- Nominated, Jazz Educator of the Year, Parliamentary Jazz Awards
- Among 12 Best Vibraphonists named in DownBeat magazine in 2015, the first musician from the UK to achieve this accolade
- Nominated, Giles Peterson Worldwide FM, Cage Street Memorial by Carleen Anderson, 2016
- Winner, Concert of the Year, Live Entertainment of the year, Jazz FM Awards, 2017
- Appointed MBE for services to music, Queen's Birthday Honours list, 2018
- Nominated, Innovation Award, Jazz FM Awards, 2019
- Nominated, Live Entertainment of the year, Jazz FM Awards, 2019
- Jazz FM's Gold Award 2020 for his services to UK jazz and jazz education
- Recipient of the prestigious Paul Hamlyn Award for Artists for his work as a composer, 2022
- Appointed visiting Fellowship Jesus College, Cambridge University, 2024.

== Discography ==
=== As leader ===
- When Tomorrow Comes (Blue Note, 1993)
- Pyrotechnics (Blue Note, 1993)
- The Vibes Describes (Blue Note, 1994)
- The Funky End of Things (Blue Note, 1994)
- Life (Blue Note, 1994)

With Savannah

- I Can't Turn Away (1981)
- Never Let You Go (1982)

With Black Top

- #One with Steve Williamson (Babel, 2014)
- #Two with Evan Parker (Babel, 2015)
- Number 3 with William Parker and Hamid Drake (Babel, 2017)

Other

- Orpheum Theatre with Sun Araw & Orphy Robinson Otoruku Download Releases 21.09.15
- Priming the Population Thru Subversive Experimental Sonic Gestures, Jamal Moss, Mark Sanders & Orphy Robinson Otoruku Download Releases 01.01.16
- Corsano / Mcphee / Prévost / Robinson Otoruku Download Releases - 15.2.16
- Pat Thomas & Orphy Robinson Otoruku Download Releases 18.4.17

=== As guest ===
With Beggar & Co

- Brass, Strings n Tings (2007)
- The Legacy (2011)

With Tony Bevan

- Bruised (2005)
- Bruise with Derek Bailey (2006)
- We Packed Are Bags (2007)

With Alexander Hawkins

- No Now Is So (2009)
- All There, Ever Out (2012)

With Jazz Warriors

- Out of Many, One People (1987)
- Chameleon (1993)

With Nigel Kennedy

- The Four Elements (2011)
- The New Four Seasons (2015)
- My World (2016)

With the London Improvisors Orchestra

- The Hearing Continues (2001)
- Freedom of the City (2002)
- Proceedings (2000)
- Responses, Reproduction & Reality (2003)

With Mica Paris

- I'd Hate to Love You (1988)
- Like Dreamers Do (1988)

With Courtney Pine

- Traditions Beckoning (1986)
- Journey to the Urge Within (1986)

With Andy Sheppard

- Andy Sheppard (1987)
- Introductions in the Dark (1989)
- Soft on the Inside (1990)

With others

- Harry Beckett, The Modern Sound of Harry Beckett (2008)
- Lol Coxhill, Spectral Soprano (2001)
- Simon H. Fell, Composition No30 BF27 (1998)
- Imagination, In and Out of Love, Body Talk (1981)
- Jazz Jamaica, Massive (2003)
- Tony Kofi, Plays Monk, All is Now (2004)
- Shawn Lee, Discomfort (1996)
- Light of the World, Round Trip + Bonus track (2008)
- Noel McKoy, Mind is the Keeper (1998)
- Monday Michiru, Jazz Brat (1994)
- Louis Moholo, An Open Letter to My Wife Mpumi (2008)
- Kate Shortt, Something to Tell You (2006)
- Spring Heel Jack, Songs & Themes (2008)
- Joss Stone, Water for the Soul (2015)
- Pat Thomas, 4 Compositions for Orchestra (2010)
- Total Contrast, Takes a Little Time (1985)
- Cleveland Watkiss, Victory's Happy Songbook (2001)
- Working Week, Fire in the Mountain (1989)
- Robert Wyatt, Comicopera (2007)

== Film and television ==
- Blood Rights, BBC Drama, episodes 1, 2 and 3 (1990), composer
- Eagle Star, 3 commercials (1993), composer/performer
- Men of the Month, BBC Films Screen Two (1994), composer
- Bollywood Queen, Arclight films (2002), performer
- The Republic of Love, Dan Films (2003), performer
- Amos Vogel & Cinema 16, Film as a Subversive Art, The Sticking Place (2004), composer
