= Brian Abrahams =

South African jazz drummer and vocalist

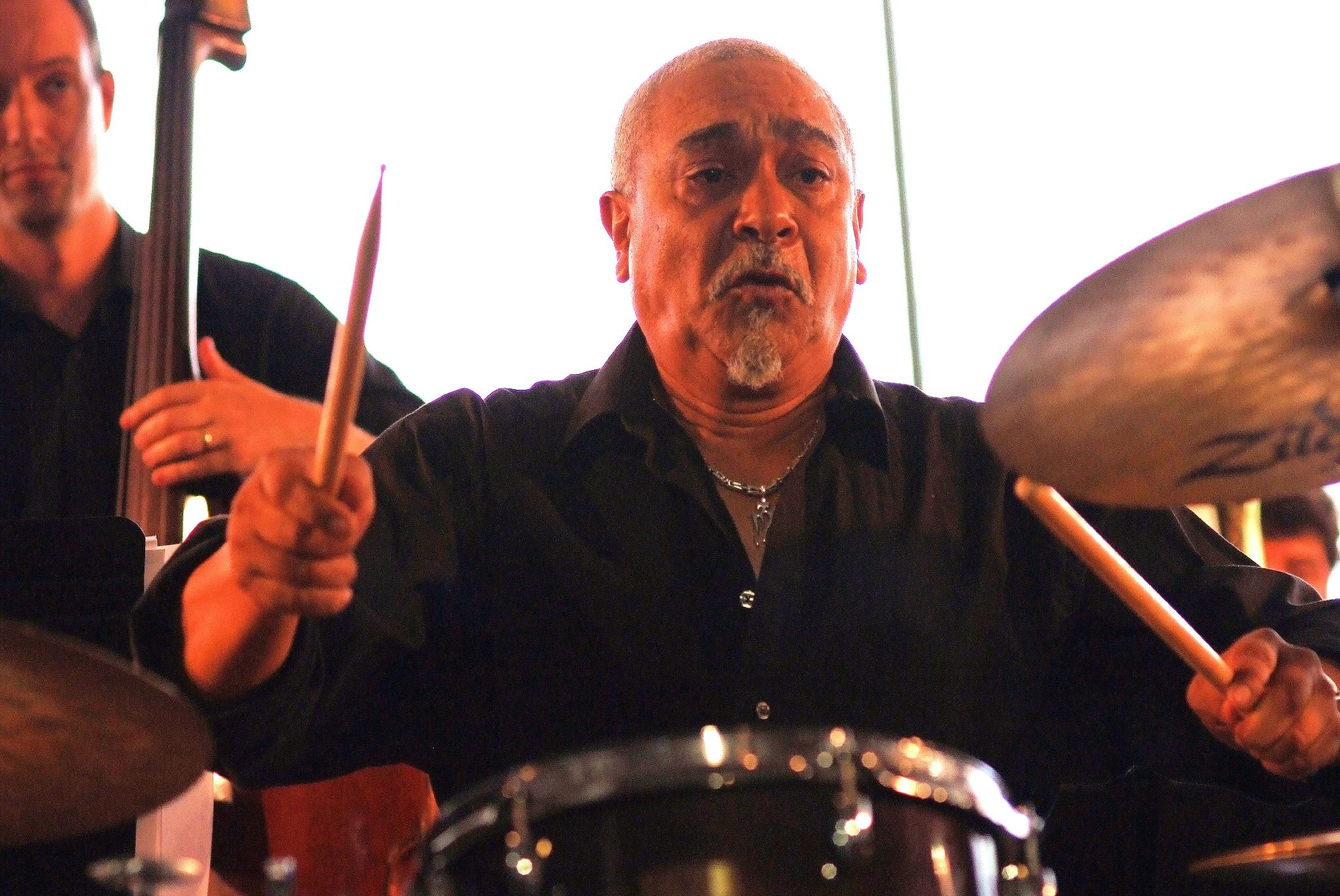

Background information
- Born: Brian Abrahams; 26 June 1947 (age 79); Cape Town, South Africa
- Genre: Jazz
- Occupation: Drummer
- Instruments: drums, vocalist
- Member of: Grand Union Orchestra, District Six

Brian Abrahams (born 26 June 1947 in Cape Town, South Africa) is a South African jazz drummer and vocalist.

== Early life ==
Abrahams started working as a singer with local bands in South Africa in the 1970s. Abrahams participated in a gig in Swaziland as drummer for Sarah Vaughan and Nancy Wilson. In 1975 he moved to the United Kingdom, where he gained his recognition.

== Musical career ==
Abrahams has worked with groups and artists such as Abdullah Ibrahim, Dudu Pukwana, Ronnie Scott, John Taylor, Johnny Dyani, Brotherhood of Breath, Jim Pepper, Dewey Redman, Mal Waldron, Archie Shepp, and Courtney Pine.

During the 1980s Abrahams founded his own group, District Six. In 1988 he joined the band Ekaya, which was founded by Abdullah Ibrahim. He joined Grand Union Orchestra in 1992 and has been working on projects led by Tony Haynes.

Abrahams re-formed District Six in Melbourne, Australia in 2009 for a performance at Dizzy's Jazz Club featuring Tony Hicks (tenor saxophone), John McAll (piano), Zvi Belling (bass), Cameron McAlister (trumpet) alongside himself on drums. District Six performed at the Wangaratta Jazz Festival in November 2009.

Abrahams currently lives and works in Melbourne and is a tutor for aspiring jazz students at the Australian Jazz Museum.

== Discography ==
- African River Abdullah Ibrahim (Enja)
- Imgoma Yabantwana (D6 Records)
- To Be Free (EG Editions Jazz)
- Force of Nature (Reel Recordings) w/ Mike Osborne
- The Rhythm Of Tides (RedGold Records, 1997) w/ Grand Union Orchestra
- Now Comes The Dragon's Hour (RedGold Records, 2002) w/ Grand Union Orchestra
- 12 For 12 (RedGold Records, 2011) w/ Grand Union Orchestra
- If Paradise (RedGold Records, 2011) w/ Grand Union Orchestra
