= Tony Haynes =

Tony Haynes may refer to:

- Tony Haynes (English composer) (born 1941), English composer
- Tony Haynes (American musician) (born 1960), American musician
