= Malik & the O.G's =

British spoken-word performance band

Malik & The O.G's
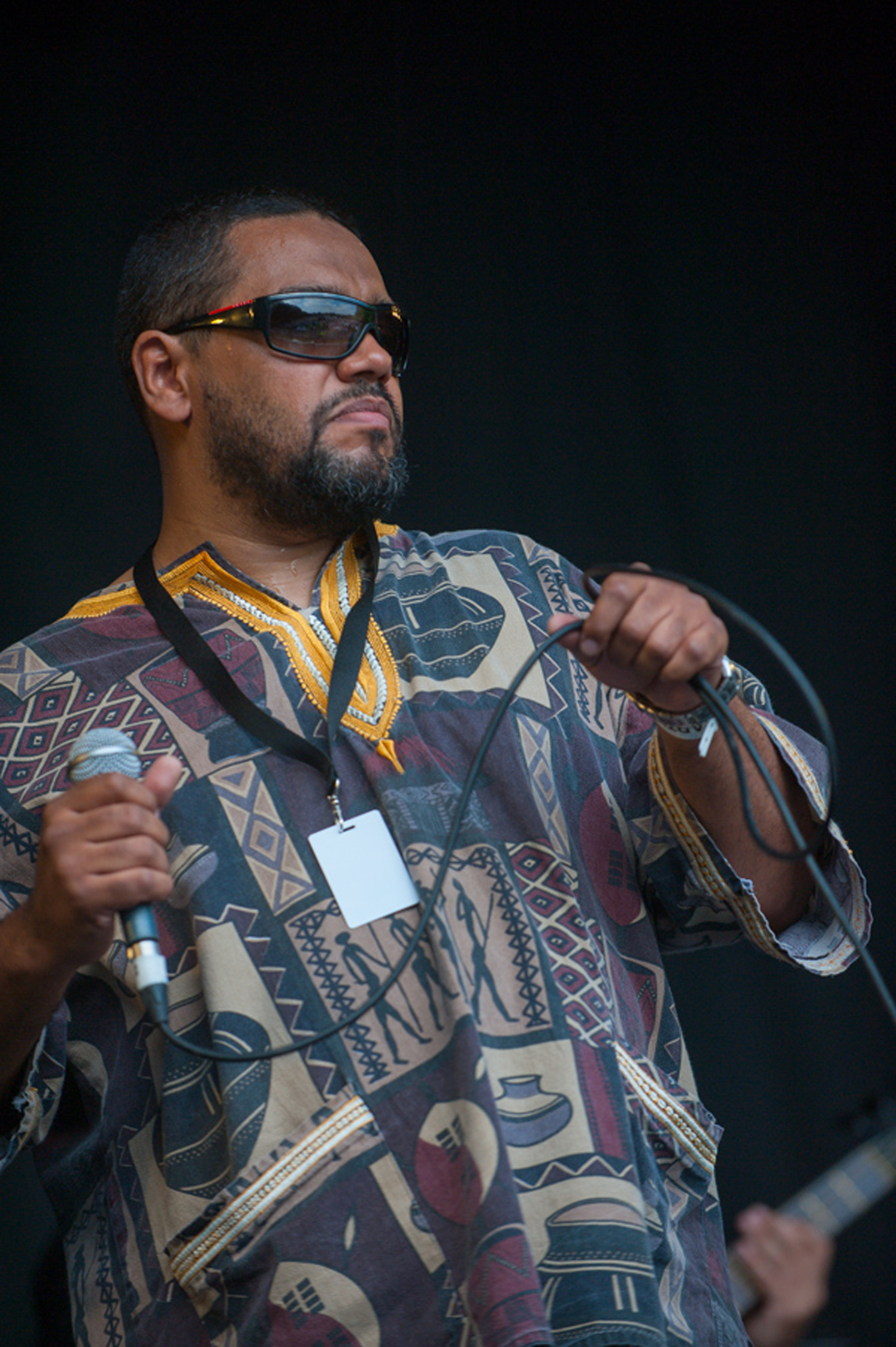
- Malik & The O.G's Live at LIMF 2013

Background information
- Born: Liverpool, England
- Genres: Spoken Word
- Occupations: Poet, Producer, Film Maker, Author
- Instrument: Vocalist
- Years active: 2004–present
- Labels: MentiS Records, MCPR Music, Fore-Word Press
- Website: malikandtheogs.blogspot.co.uk

Malik & the O.G's is a spoken-word performance band based in Liverpool. Its founder Malik Al Nasir put the band together in 2006, when he first recorded his poetry to music for his debut album Rhythms of the Diaspora Vol 1 & 2, which was released in on Mentis Records featuring Gil Scott-Heron and The Last Poets′ Jalal Mansur Nuriddin. Malik produced the album in 2006 and Malik & the O.G's produced a video with Emmy Award-winning director Mitchell Stuart for the song from the album Africa, an adaptation of one of the poems of the same name in Malik's book Ordinary Guy.

== Roots ==
Malik & the O.G's was born out of the political poetry movement that was rooted in the civil rights era in America. In 1984, Gil Scott-Heron toured the UK and met Malik Al Nasir backstage at a concert.

Scott-Heron then trained Malik Al Nasir over a period spanning more than 20 years as a poet and also in the politics of the civil rights era. Jalal Mansur Nuriddin (of The Last Poets) wrote the foreword to the book Ordinary Guy, which was a tribute to Scott-Heron. In 2006, Malik recorded Rhythms of the Diaspora Vol 1 & 2, his debut album, with Gil Scott-Heron and Jalal of The Last Poets under his band name Malik & the O.G's. The double album was released in August 2015 on MentiS RecordS, followed by the Africa EP, on the same label in 2017.

== Appearances ==
Malik & the O.G's also featured in a documentary, Word up – From Ghetto to Mecca, with political black poets Gil Scott-Heron, Jalal Mansur Nuriddin of The Last Poets and UK Dub poet Benjamin Zephaniah, as well as Rod Youngs (drummer from The Amnesia Express). The film premiered at the Phoenix Cinema in Leicester, UK, in 2011 as part of the "Black History Season" dedicated to the late Gil Scott-Heron. It is shown as part of a double bill with the XL Recordings film "Who is Gil Scott-Heron?" at FACT Cinema Liverpool on 22 August 2015.

In 2011, Malik & the O.G's were invited to perform at Judith E. Wilson's Drama Studio at Cambridge University. The band at that time included Malik Al Nasir lead vocal, Rod Youngs (Gil Scott-Heron's Amnesia Express), Cambridge-based bass player Tiago Coimbra, Senegalese percussionist Makhou and engineer Tom Parker.

In 2013, Malik & the O.G's were invited by Liverpool City Council to perform their poetry at the inauguration of Liverpool International Music Festival, where the band was placed on the "It's Liverpool – Legends" stage. After the festival Malik was asked to perform some anti-war poetry for online TV station Bay TV where he delivered the politically charged poem "Shock & Awe", performed at the Liverpool International Music Festival, which is based on Gil Scott-Heron's anti-war protest song "Re-Ron".

In February 2014, Malik & the O.G's supported Jalal of The Last Poets at the live performance of "Hustlers Convention" at the Jazz Café in London. with Jazz Warriors – Cleveland Watkiss, Hawi Gondwe (Amy Winehouse Band) and Orphy Robinson (Don Cherry Band) The sold out performance was filmed for a documentary on Hustlers Convention commissioned by Chuck D of Public Enemy .

Malik & The O.G's produced a series of tribute events to Gil Scott-Heron in 2015 including "Poets Against Apartheid -The Legacy of Gil Scott-Heron" as part of UNESCO International Slavery Remembrance Day commemorations in partnership with Liverpool's International Slavery Museum. The event featured spoken-word performances from Malik Al Nasir, Tayo Aluko and Jean Binta Breeze (MBE), also "The Revolution Will Be Live!" with business partner Richard McGinnis, this event was commissioned as part of Liverpool International Music Festival 2015 and featured Talib Kweli, The Christians, Craig Charles, Malik & the O.G's, Cleveland Watkiss and others. The show was filmed at St Georges Hall on 27 August 2015.

== Bibliography ==
- Abdul Malik Al Nasir, "Gil Scott-Heron Saved My Life" (as told to Simon Hattenstone), The Guardian, 19 June 2011.
- Mike "The Dood" Edwards, "Malik & The O.G's 2014", Vibe Magazine, March 2014.
- Sunny Sharma D, "Interview with Malik & the O.G's", I Am Hip-Hop Magazine, 7 February 2014
- Paul Lester, "Gil Scott-Heron: the revolution lives on", The Guardian, 26 August 2015.
- Emily Jupp, "How Gil Scott-Heron changed my life", The Independent, 21 August 2015.
- Chris Tang, "Gil Scott-Heron Tribute Night", Jocks & Nerds, 18 August 2015.
- Tom Short, "No Re-Run, Brother: Gil Scott-Heron celebrated at Liverpool International Music Festival", The Skinny, 6 August 2015.
- Glyn Akroyd, "Malik & The O.G's", Bido Lito, Issue 58, August 2015.

== Radio appearances ==
- BBC World Service, Outlook Extraordinary personal stories from around the world. with Matthew Bannister, broadcast, Mon 27 June 2011 14:32 GMT, Mon 27 June 2011 19:32 GMT, Mon 27 June 2011 23:32 GMT, Tue 28 June 2011, 01:32 GMT, Tue 28 June 2011 10:05 GMT.
- BBC Radio 4, Saturday Live with Claire Balding and Al Jarreau.
- BBC Radio 5 Live, "Up all Night" with Dotun Adebayo, broadcast, Sunday 20 November 2011
- BBC Radio Leicester, 104.9 fm "Dulcie Dixon Show", with Erol Melbourne, broadcast Sunday 2 October 2011

== Filmography ==
- Word Up – From Ghetto To Mecca, Film Premiere, Phoenix Cinema, Leicester, UK.
- BBC News, "Liverpool riots - caused by government cuts", with Ed Thomas.
- Hustlers Convention Documentary, released at Docfest Sheffield, July 2015.
- Bay TV, News, August 2015.
- Who is Gil Scott-Heron Documentary, released in the UK August 2015.

=== Discography ===
Year	Album	Artist	Label	Format	CD Cat No.
2017	Africa EP	Malik & the O.G's	MentiS Records	6 Track EP	Mentis002

Year	Album	Artist	Label	Format	CD Cat No.
2015	Rhythms of the Diaspora Vol 1.	Malik & the O.G's Ft. Gil Scott-Heron	MentiS Records	2 Disc CD	Mentis001

Year	Album	Artist	Label	Format	CD Cat No.
2015	Rhythms of the Diaspora Vol 2.	Malik & the O.G's Ft. The Last Poets	MentiS Records	2 Disc CD	Mentis001

=== Collaboration albums ===
Year	Album	Artist	Label	Format	CD Cat No.
2009	Drumquestra	Larry McDonald (percussionist)	MCPR Music	CD	CPLM301

Year	Album	Artist	Label	Format
2008	Urban Griot	Raw UnLtd	MCPR Music	Unreleased

=== Collaboration album credits ===
- Larry McDonald (percussionist), "Drumquestra" MCPR Music 2009 (Cat No: CPLM301)
