= Jalal Mansur Nuriddin =

American poet and musician (1944–2018)

Jalal Mansur Nuriddin Jalaluddin Mansur Nuriddin
- Also known as: Alafia Pudim; Lightnin' Rod; The Grandfather of Rap
- Born: Lawrence Padilla; July 24, 1944; Brooklyn, New York, U.S.
- Died: June 4, 2018 (aged 73)
- Genres: Spoken word, hip hop
- Years active: 1960s–2018
- Labels: Douglas Records, Casablanca Records, Celluloid Records, On the One, On U Sound, Charly Records, Acid Jazz
- Website: grandfatherofrap.com

Jalaluddin Mansur Nuriddin (July 24, 1944 – June 4, 2018) was an American poet and musician. He was one of the founding members of The Last Poets, a group of poets and musicians that evolved in the 1960s out of the Harlem Writers Workshop in New York City.

He was born Lawrence Padilla in Fort Greene in Brooklyn, New York, USA. Earlier in his career he used the names Lightnin' Rod and Alafia Pudim. He is sometimes called "The Grandfather of Rap".

A devout Muslim, poet, acupuncturist, and martial art exponent (a practitioner of a form of Bak Mei), Nuriddin's talent and genius with words and rhythm are renowned and he produced some epic poems such as "Be-Yon-Der", an 18-minute piece on The Last Poets 1977 album Delights of the Garden, which was originally released on Douglas Records, and later on Celluloid Records.

== Early life ==
Jalal Mansur Nuriddin grew up in Fort Greene, a neighborhood of project buildings near the Brooklyn Navy Yard. Running with a local gang, the Fort Greene Chaplains, they fought a street rivalry with the Bed-Stuy Bishops, from further up on Myrtle Avenue, which ran through both neighborhoods. He was incarcerated during this period.

He was given early release on condition that he join the Army, where he trained as a paratrooper but was imprisoned again within the Army for refusing to salute the American flag. He did, however, receive an honourable discharge and went to work for a bank on Wall Street. It was his experience there that spawned his poem "E-Pluribus Unum", from 1973's Chastisement. Nuriddin converted to Islam while in jail and in 2003 went on a pilgrimage to Mecca. While in jail he learned to spiel, an early form of rap, which he called "spoagraphics" or "spoken pictures". It was also known as toasting, which was a form of rhythmic spoken poetry accompanied by ad hoc percussion by prison inmates, such as the famous Signified Monkey toast popularised by comedian Dolemite.

== The Last Poets ==
Nuriddin joined the first version of The Last Poets, with members Gylan Kain, David Nelson, and Felipe Luciano, but left before the trio recorded and released their only album, Right On, in 1967, the soundtrack to a documentary movie of the same name. As he informed them of the intention to form his own group called The Last Poets, the Right On album was released under the name The Original Last Poets.

Together with Umar Bin Hassan and the late Nilja, their percussionist, he released in 1969 the self-titled first album The Last Poets, followed in 1970 by This Is Madness. In 1971, that follow-up album landed the group on President Richard Nixon's Cointelpro radicals list targeted for surveillance by the FBI. At the time, his name was still credited as Alafia Pudim, but he later changed it to the Islamic name (Jalaluddin – The Glory of the Faith, Mansur – Victorious, Nuriddin – The Light of the Faith) by which he is known today. Nuriddin's fellow poet and friend the late Suleiman El-Hadi replaced Nilja on the third album, Chastisement, and also recorded 1974's At Last (the only recording to include Nuriddin, Bin Hassan, and El-Hadi together). Altogether, there were six albums released by the Nuriddin / El-Hadi "mach two" edition of the Poets, culminating with 1993's Scatterap/Home. Later members included Kenyatte Abdur-Rahman, composer and vibraphonist (who died in November 2015) on the album Scatterap/Home, and Abu Mustafa (also deceased).

"Lightnin' Rod" was the pseudonym of Nuriddin when he released his seminal 1973 Hustlers Convention LP, featuring tracks including "Sport" and "Spoon" and "Coppin' Some Fronts for the Set". The album was released on United Artists and featured Tina Turner and The Ikettes, Bernard Purdie, Billy Preston, Cornell Dupree, and Kool and the Gang. Most of the lyrics deal with the way of life in ghettos, i.e. hustling, drugs, gambling and money with the outcome being a shoot out with the cops followed by jail where the hustlers learn "The whole truth". A sequel, The Hustlers Detention is purportedly in the pipeline with the final part being "The Hustlers Ascension". Hustlers Convention has been sampled by many hip-hop artists; producer Ron Saint Germain had declared it to be "one of the most stolen and sampled albums ever made".

In April 2008, Nuriddin reunited and reconciled with fellow Last Poets Umar Bin Hassan and Abiodun Oyewole, along with David Nelson and Felipe Luciano, all of whom appear in Made in Amerikkka, a documentary by French film-maker Claude Santiago. Bin Hassan recalled in a Billboard article how the fiery and passionate Last Poets in the 1970s said things they should not have said: "we were all young men, 19, 20 years old. What do we know, really, about the world, about ourselves, America, race relations?"

Nuriddin made an album for Adrian Sherwood. and the single "Mankind, Pt. 2", produced by Skip McDonald and released on Sherwood's label On-U Sound, can be heard over the closing credits of the film 187.

Nuriddin and the Last Poets also had a cameo appearance in John Singleton's 1993 film Poetic Justice, starring Janet Jackson and Tupac Shakur.

== 2004–2018 ==
In 2004, Nuriddin wrote the foreword to Malik Al Nasir's poetry collection Ordinary Guy, published under Malik's pre-Islamic name Mark T. Watson in the UK by Fore-Word Press. Nuriddin was also featured in the documentary Word Up – From Ghetto to Mecca, along with poets Gil Scott Heron, Mark T. Watson a.k.a. Malik Al Nasir, Rod Youngs (Gil Scott-Heron's Amnesia Express) and dub poet Benjamin Zephaniah, where he discussed the significance of the spoken word as an extension of the African oral tradition, as well as the origins of rap and the work of his student and friend Malik Al Nasir. In the film Nuriddin recites from Al Nasir's book Ordinary Guy the poem he wrote as a foreword to it, called "Malik's Mode". Nuriddin also later recorded "Malik's Mode" with Al Nasir's band "Malik & the O.G's" for the album Rhythms of the Diaspora Vol's 1 & 2 at Mercredi 9 Studios in Paris, while filming the Word Up documentary. The album Rhythms of the Diaspora Vol's 1 & 2 was released on August 1, 2015, on Mentis Records in the UK.

Nuriddin returned to the UK in 2014 to perform live the seminal solo album Hustlers Convention, credited as being the first ever rap album live at the Jazz Café in Camden Town, London. The event was produced by Fore-Word Press for Riverhorse Communications, who filmed it as part of a documentary on the forgotten roots of rap called Hustlers Convention. The executive producer is Public Enemy's front man Chuck D. The film Hustlers Convention, directed by Mike Todd, premiered at Docfest in Sheffield, UK, in 2015, with its London premiere at the Institute of Contemporary Arts, on June 14, 2015. The Hustlers Convention Live featured The Jazz Warriors International Collective, Malik & the O.G's and poet Lemn Sissay. The UK DVD release of the historical Hustlers Convention was in 2015. After the film premiered in the UK at Docfest 2015 it went on general release throughKaleidoscope and premiered in New York at TriBeca Film Festival 2015 for its USA cinema release. Nuriddin screened the film also in Canada in 2016 as part of a tour with UK poet Malik Al Nasir called "The Revolution Will Be Live", comprising seminars, poetry performances, school visits, workshops and joint screenings of Al Nasir's film also featuring Nuriddin, called Word-Up.

Jalal died after a long battle with cancer on June 4, 2018.

== Selected discography ==
- On The One
- The Fruits of Rap
- Science Friction
- Mean Machine (1984) 12"

=== The Last Poets ===
- Long Enough 12" (The Last Poets)

=== Lightnin' Rod ===
- Hustlers Convention (1973, United Artists Douglas Records Cat No: UA-LA156-F, featuring King Curtis, Cornell Dupree, Eric Gale, Gene Dinwiddie, Buzz Feiten, Kool & the Gang, Billy Preston engineers Tony Bongiovi and Ron Saint Germain)
- Doriella Du Fontaine (session recorded by Alan Douglas in November 1969, with Jimi Hendrix and Buddy Miles).

=== Guest appearances ===
- Material: The Third Power; E Pluribus Unum and Power Of Soul (Black Chant).
- Working Week: Working Nights / 12"; Stella Marina.
- Apollo 440: Dude Descending A Staircase; Hustler Groove and The Children of the Future.
- Cosmo Vitelli: Video; Science Affliction.
- Silent Poets: Words and Silence; Inquizative, Derivative, and The Children of the Future.
- Faya Dub: Sings and Plays; Reggae Monk.
- Seven Dub: Rock It Tonight; Land of the Lost and Naturally.
- Michel Benita: Drastic; Sky Screen.
- Aktivist: Stereotape; Nouvelle Experience.
- Various Artists: Acid Jazz And Other Illicit Grooves (spoken word — Introduction only)
- Various Artists: 12" / 30 Ans Apres Martin Luther King.
- Various Artists: Tempo Jazz Edition Volume 1 – Talking Loud; Mean Machine '90.
- Malik & the O.G's: Rhythms of the Diaspora Vol's 1 & 2 Featuring Gil Scott-Heron & The Last Poets (spoken word – Jazzoetry); "Malik's Mode", Mentis Records 2015.
- Stephen McCraven: Killing Us Hardly; "We Can't Stand It", 2018

=== Filmography ===
- Poetic Justice, directed by John Singleton. With Janet Jackson and Tupac Shakur.
- Art Blakey, directed by Dick Fontaine, featuring Art Blakey, Wayne Shorter, Branford Marsalis, Courtney Pine and Steve Williamson.
