= Keith Morris (musician) =

British jazz musician

- Born: Cardiff, Wales
- Died: 8 June 2005 Newcastle upon Tyne
- Genre: Jazz
- Occupations: Musician, composer, bandleader
- Instruments: piano; violin; bass guitar; tenor saxophone; soprano saxophone; bass clarinet
- Years active: 1975-2005

Keith Morris was a British multi-instrumentalist jazz musician, composer and bandleader.

== Music career ==
During the 1980s, Morris was a member of the Tyneside radical performers' collective Red Umbrella. He played on picket lines and at demonstrations with The Stumbling Band and at benefits for strikers, solidarity movements and other progressive causes as a founder member of the band Red Music.

=== Kent Moped Orchestra ===
Morris formed the Kent Moped Orchestra after noticing when on tour in Bulgaria that his name written in Cyrillic script looked like "Kent Moped". The 11-piece band performed all over England, including Newcastle Jazz Festival in 1992 and Huddersfield Jazz in the Park in 1994.

The group were funded as part of the Arts Council's Great Britain Touring Fund in 1993/94.

=== Grand Union Orchestra ===
Morris joined Tony Haynes's Grand Union Orchestra in 1984 and played soprano and tenor saxophone on their debut album, The Song of Many Tongues. He became a core member of the group for the next 20 years, playing bass guitar on later releases including The Rhythm of Tides (1997), Now Comes The Dragon's Hour (2002) and If Paradise (recorded in 2003, released posthumously in 2011).

=== Later work ===
In 1999, Keith Morris and Charlie McGovern established the influential Schmazz jazz club at The Cluny in Newcastle. He ran the weekly club for four years, bringing radical performers like Gilad Atzmon and Reem Kelani to the city. Schmazz placed an emphasis on experimentation and open-mindedness, with a rule that "original material must make up the main body of the music played. It's not that we don't like 'jazz standards'. It's just that they're catered for elsewhere".

In 2000-2001, he was resident composer at Kulturhuset USF in Bergen, Norway. He wrote music for a jazz theatre piece inspired by the River Tyne, Downriver, with the poet Sean O'Brien, which was performed at the Newcastle Playhouse in 2001. Morris also wrote music for two other works by Sean O'Brien, Keepers Of The Flame and Songs from the Drowned Book.

Morris was commissioned by New Writing North to commemorate the poet Andrew Waterhouse by setting a series of poems to music, including "Song for the Crossing" by Sean O'Brien.

He formed a group called Metalwork which specialised in music for metal instruments only. Other bands he played with include the Lewis Watson Quartet, the John Warren Octet, Pylon, Cheap At The Price and Ipso Facto.

== Personal life ==
Morris moved to Newcastle in 1971 to study music at Newcastle University and remained living there after graduation.

He was married to the poet Ellen Phethean and had two sons, Fred and Johnny, both of whom also embarked on careers in music.

Morris was killed in a hit-and-run incident in Newcastle on Wednesday 8 June 2005, aged 52. He was with his friend, the musician Joe Scurfield, who also died. A memorial concert to mark the 10th anniversary of his death was held in Gateshead in June 2015 and included performances by Grand Union Orchestra and Kent Moped Orchestra.
