= Claude Deppa =

South African jazz trumpeter (born 1958)

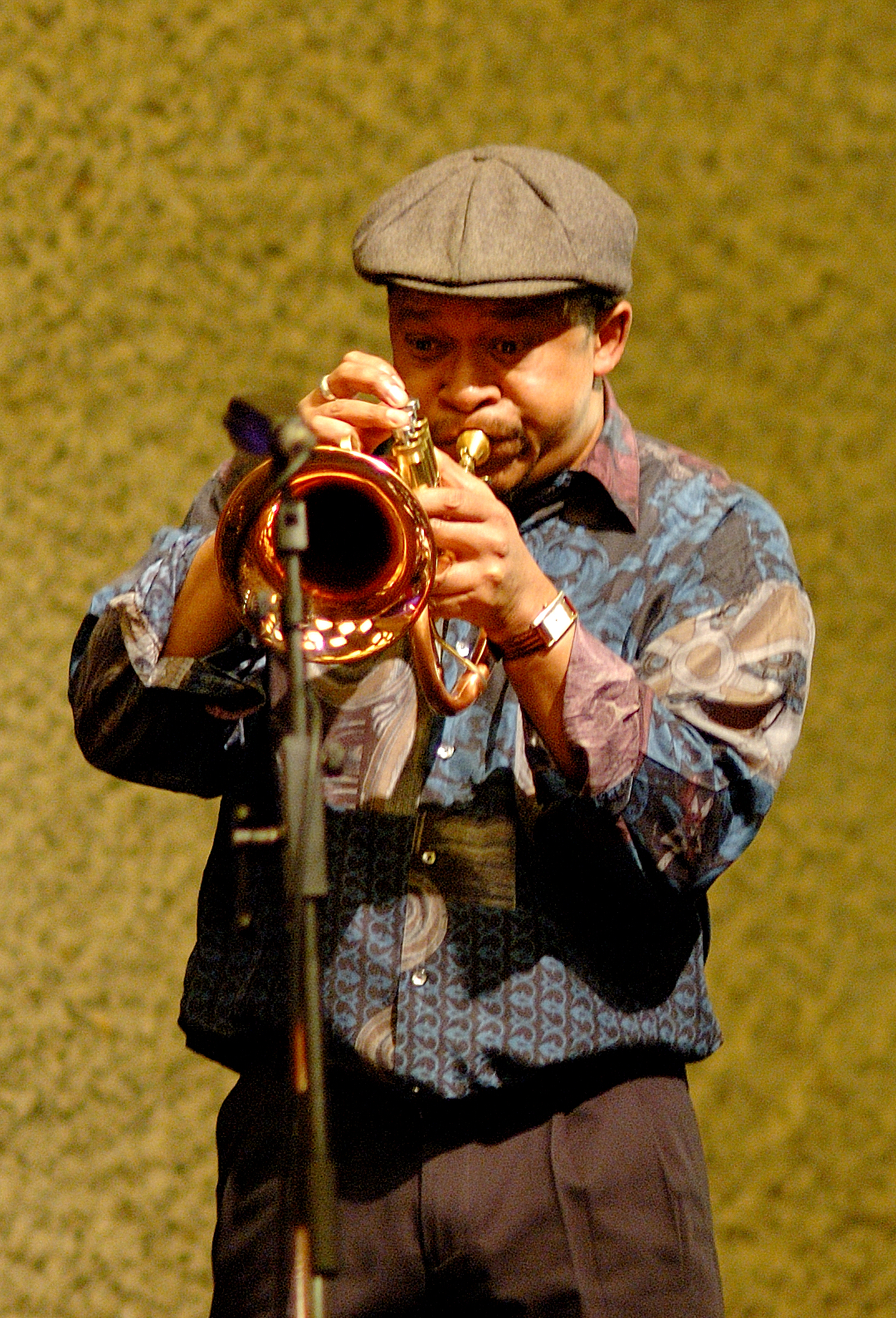
- Claude Deppa

Background information
- Born: 10 May 1958 (age 68); Cape Town, South Africa
- Genres: Jazz
- Occupation: Musician
- Instruments: Trumpet, flugelhorn

Claude Deppa (born 10 May 1958) is a South African jazz trumpeter born in Cape Town, South Africa, probably best known for his work with the Brotherhood of Breath and Carla Bley.

== Early life ==
Claude Deppa was born in Cape Town, South Africa, and moved with his family to England in 1974. Having learned drums as a child, he focused on trumpet and the flugelhorn when at secondary school in the UK.

== Music career ==
Deppa began his professional career as a member of Dave Holdsworth’s quartet and also played with a band led by Johnny Mbizo Dyani. He was a founding member of the Jazz Warriors in London. He joined Grand Union Orchestra in 1984 and has been a prominent member of the group led by Tony Haynes for over 30 years.

Deppa has played and recorded with a wide variety of international jazz talent, including Art Blakey, Carla Bley’s big band, Chris McGregor’s Brotherhood Of Breath, Miriam Makeba, Louis Moholo, Evan Parker, Courtney Pine’s Jazz Warriors, and Andy Sheppard’s Big Co-Motion.

As bandleader, Deppa has performed with, directed and composed for African Jazz Explosion, Horns Unlimited and Five Funky Fellas. Together with saxophonist Clare Hirst, Deppa performs and composes for the Deppa Hirst Band, who have appeared live at jazz festivals in Marlborough, Ipswich and Swanage.

He leads the brass and woodwind section of Kinetica Bloco, a project that celebrates the music of the African diaspora with themed summer schools and performances.

== Discography ==
- The Song of Many Tongues - Grand Union Orchestra (RedGold Records, 1986)
- Out Of Many, One People - Jazz Warriors (Antilles, 1987)
- Country Cooking - Chris McGregor's Brotherhood of Breath (Venture, 1988)
- Louis Moholo's Viva La Black (Ogun, 1988)
- Freedom Calls - Grand Union Orchestra (RedGold Records, 1989)
- Welela - Miriam Makeba (Polydor, 1989)
- Soft On The Inside - Andy Sheppard (Island Records, 1990)
- In Co-Motion - Andy Sheppard (Antilles, 1991)
- The Very Big Carla Bley Band - Carla Bley (WATT, 1991)
- Rhythm Method - Andy Sheppard (Blue Note International, 1993)
- Delivery Suite - Andy Sheppard (Blue Note International, 1993)
- Big Band Theory - Carla Bley (WATT, 1993)
- The Rhythm of Tides - Grand Union Orchestra (RedGold Records, 1997)
- Toi Toi (Jika Records, 2003)
