= Hustlers Convention =

Hustlers Convention may refer to:

- Hustlers Convention (house duo)
- Hustlers Convention (Lightnin' Rod album)
- Hustlers Convention, a compilation album by Music of Life
