= Carlos Malcolm =

Jamaican trombonist, percussionist and bandleader (1934–2026)

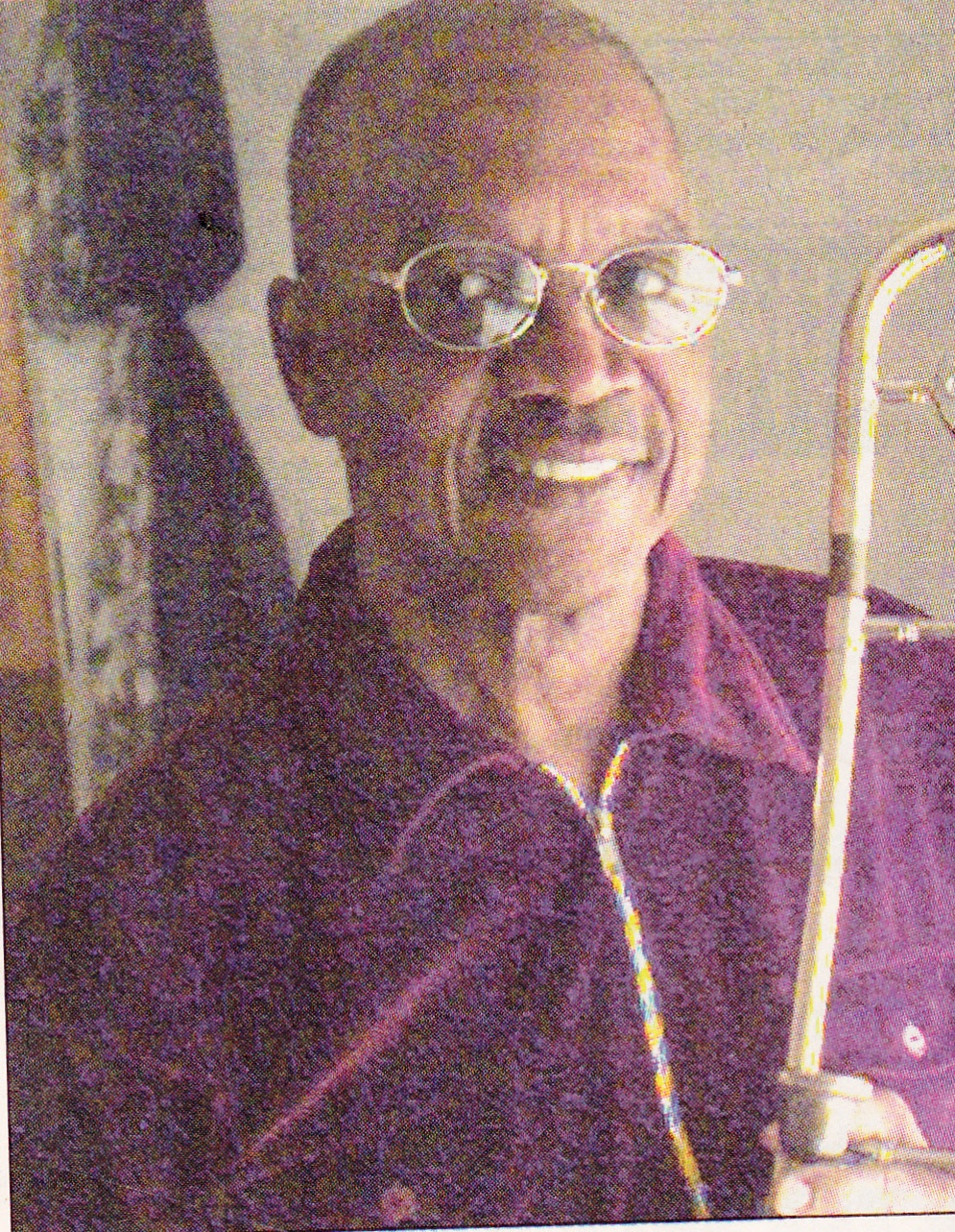

Background information
- Born: Carlos Antonio Malcolm; 10 November 1934; Colón, Panama
- Died: 6 May 2026 (aged 91)
- Genres: Mento, ska, jazz, reggae
- Occupations: Bandleader, Musician
- Instruments: Trombone, percussion
- Years active: Late 1950s–2026
- Label: Up-Beat
- Website: carlos-malcolm.com

Carlos Antonio Malcolm OD (10 November 1934 – 6 May 2026) was a Jamaican trombonist, percussionist and bandleader who helped cultivate the Jamaican genres of ska and reggae.

== Life and career ==
Carlos Malcolm was born in Colón, Panama on 10 November 1934, to Jamaican parents and grew up in Kingston. His father, Wilfred Malcolm, went to Panama and worked as a bookkeeper in the Panama Canal Zone. He became a prominent business man in the city of Colon, established homes in both countries and sent his five children back to Jamaica to be educated. Having studied the liturgy and music of the Anglican (Episcopalian) Church, Wilfred Malcolm was an Anglican church choir director for many years. He also played trombone in the "Jazz Aristocrats", a Panamanian Dixieland band for which he was manager, and he took the band to Jamaica in 1936.

Wilfred Malcolm had quite a collection of eclectic music that extended from Bach and Handel to Duke Ellington and Count Basie. Reflecting upon this period of his life, Malcolm often mused that he probably "subliminally osmosed" the musical styles and arranging formats of various composers as he whistled back at the music wafting through the house every evening his father came home. This probably accounts for Malcolm's notoriety among peers as a "Musical Chameleon" because he arranges music and functions comfortably in a variety of musical cultures and genres. His father and a few prominent West Indian businessmen in Panama formed a committee that brought to Panama world-class Black-American artists in the performing arts. As a child, Malcolm recalled listening from the bedroom to conversations and laughter from guests, including celebrated artists Paul Robeson (baritone), Marian Anderson (contralto), Hazel Scott–Powell (wife of Adam Clayton Powell Jr., of Abyssinia Baptist Church of Harlem) as they came to late dinners after recitals at a local theatre.

Malcolm's father taught him to play the trombone. He also recognised Malcolm's natural gift for creating and arranging music and supported his son's desire to pursue an education in the arts. Malcolm held Bachelor of Arts degrees in English and Music from the Union Institute & University located in Cincinnati, Ohio.

He studied music at the Conservatory of Music in Panama. From the late 1950s Carlos Malcolm worked professionally as a musician in conjunction with his "other job" as a photo journalist with the West Indian Review magazine in Kingston. His first music "gigs" were with the Vivian Hall All Stars which featured Don Drummond on trombone. Malcolm and Drummond became good friends and quite often would practice the trombone together.

With independence looming in the future the Government of Jamaica resolved to develop its native talent in the visual and performing arts. Malcolm (invited by Sonny Bradshaw) was among the first cadre of writers, producers and musicians to develop and showcase local talent in the performing arts on live shows broadcast from local theatres, produced by the newly constructed Jamaica Broadcasting Corporation. As Head Arranger in the Variety Department, Carlos Malcolm was the first arranger to write formal arrangements of Jamaica Ska music. Many of the early Ska musical arrangements for singers were "head arrangements" improvised by the accompanying musicians "at the mike." Malcolm would transcribe music from 7-inch 45 rpm records and formally re-arrange the music for the JBC Studio Band to accompany singers on live shows. The popular Jamaican Hit Parade program partially developed by Malcolm, spawned and influenced the careers of many Jamaican artists such as Jimmy Cliff and Bob Marley, who later became international Jamaican music icons.

Along with musicians such as Bertie King and Lennie Hibbert, Malcolm formed a short-lived school of jazz with the aim of producing home-grown jazz musicians who could make music that would sell overseas; recorded music at that time was mostly imported.

In addition to his contract at the Jamaica Broadcasting Corporation (JBC), Malcolm also worked as a composer and arranger for other clients such as the Jamaica Little Theatre Movement for whom he created the original musical for the libretti of two pantomimes: Banana Boy in December 1958 (libretto by Ortford St John) and Jamaica Way in 1960– libretto by Samuel Hillary. In 1962 Malcolm became the first musical director of the Jamaica National Dance Theatre Company created by Rex Nettleford of the University of the West Indies, for which Malcolm and Oswald Russell created original works for the debut performance of the Company at the Inaugural Celebrations of Jamaica's Independence.

In 1963 Eon Production went to Jamaica to film Dr. No, the first James Bond movie, and employed Carlos Malcolm to write incidental tropical music for the film. He was appointed Director of "Island Content" of the musical score.

Prior to forming his own band, Carlos Malcolm's music company, Carmal, created musical commercial jingles for several American and English brand products publicised by advertising agencies in Kingston: Vick's VapoRub, Shell Oil, Texaco Oil, Tek Toothbrushes, Milo Cup of Health, Berger Paints, Maxwell House Coffee and many more.

Combining the experiences of his journey in music, Carlos formed his own band in 1963 called the Afro-Jamaican Rhythms, with members including Karl Bryan (saxophone), Larry McDonald (conga drums), Boris Gardiner (vocals, bass), Lascelles Perkins (vocals), and Winston "Sparrow" Martin (drums). Other members during the 1960s included Joe Higgs, and Eddie Parkins. The band played a blend of Ska, Mento, African and jazz music and recorded several albums in the 1960s. They enjoyed a big hit in Jamaica in 1964 with their version of the theme from Bonanza, retitled "Bonanza Ska". Other hits included "Rukumbine" (1963). Malcolm also spent time in New York in the mid-1960s where he recorded the albums Don't Walk, Dance! (1964) and Sounds of the Caribbean (1966), blending Caribbean and American styles. His 1970 album Bustin' Outta the Ghetto concentrated on funk with only a slight Jamaican influence. The "Bustin' Outta the Ghetto" CD is still much-sought by Deep Funk collectors of the fully-fledged funk arrangements. From the late the 1970s through the '80s Carlos took a hiatus to bring up his family. He went back to publishing and worked for a large newspaper in Orange County, California, selling display advertising. In 1995, Carlos Malcolm was inducted into the Hall of Fame at the Ocho Rios Jazz Festival, along with James Moody, the celebrated jazz alto saxophonist/flautist.

In 1998 Carlos collaborated with US violinist and producer Robert Michael Way, aka "Zimbobway", on a projected pair of albums, The Return of Skalypso and No Forget The Bamboo Man. During this collaborative work, Carlos arranged twenty-four songs including four new compositions of Ska and Mento as well as four original works by Zimbobway. Musicians in the King Kingston Orchestra included Jamaican music legends Lloyd Wilkes (lead vocals) from The Sheiks, Pluto Shervington (bass/vocals), Trevor Lopez (guitar/vocals), Larry MacDonald (percussion), Fred Campbell (drums), and Cedric "Im" Brooks (tenor saxophone) all who were the original members and players with Carlos Malcolm and the Afro-Jamaican Rhythms.

In 1999, Malcolm was appointed an Artist in Residence by the California Arts Council for the City of San Diego, California. There he created alternate educational learning programs, taught in middle schools and mentored "at-risk" teenagers in community centres with his program "Bak2bay6–with a Musical Twist", which teaches young students and adults the elements of English, Math, Music and Critical Thinking, using "rap" and original songs to deliver subject matters.

In August 2000, Malcolm was invited by the Government of Jamaica, along with his orchestra, to the 37th Independence Celebrations and presented the Prime Minister's Lifetime Award for both his excellence in music and for his contributions to the development and enhancement of Jamaican music, internationally.

In 2006, Carlos Malcolm was invited to Melbourne to deliver a lecture at the Victoria University of Melbourne to a group of academicians from various other cities, on his Early Education Children's Program, "Bak2bay6– With a Musical Twist". While in Australia, at the invitation of Australian National Radio Carlos also delivered a lecture/demonstration on the "History of Reggae Music" at the Prince Albert Ballroom in Melbourne. In his lecture, Malcolm would periodically interrupt the lecture and conduct the 27-piece Melbourne Ska Orchestra to demonstrate how Jamaican Mento music seamlessly blended with New Orleans "Shuffle" music with a back-beat to deliver into a throbbing, indigenously Jamaican by-product named Ska music, and how Ska music evolved into the international phenomenon of Reggae.

After relocating to Florida in the mid-2000s, Malcolm continued to write and animate learning modules for his alternate education programs using original songs, and had more than 100 compositions and arrangements featured on Amazon, iTunes and other outlets. He also completed his book, Carlos Malcolm- A Personal History of Post-war Jamaican Music: New Orleans Jazz, Blues to Reggae exclusively sold on Amazon.com. Although he loved teaching and spending quality time with his loved ones, Malcolm still composed Caribbean piano etudes and developed symphonic works of Jamaican folk (Mento) and other Caribbean folk music. It is through these symphonic works, that he created original compositions that combined the elements of Caribbean polyrhythm, jazz and classical music formats and harmonies within each work.

Malcolm died on 6 May 2026, at the age of 91.

== Discography ==
- Ska-Mania: The Sound of the Soil (1962), Up-Beat– Carlos Malcolm & His Afro-Jamaican Rhythms
- Space Flight (1963), Up-Beat- Carlos Malcolm & His Afro-Jamaican Rhythms
- Don't Walk, Dance! (1964), Roulette
- Sounds of the Caribbean (1966), Scepter– Carlos Malcolm & Jamaica Brass
- Bustin' Outta The Ghetto (1970), AJP
- Rap Reggae Christmas in the Caribbean (2007), Up-Beat

Compilations

- Presenting the Royal Ska (1998), Jamaican Gold– Carlos Malcolm & His Afro-Jamaican Rhythms

Collaborations
- Skalypso (1998) (single release featuring "Knock me a Kiss" and "Bedbug", Athanasius Recording Company – Zimbobway's King Kingston Orchestra)
