= Mingo Rangel =

- Birth name: Carlos Alberto Rangel de Andrade
- Born: 1958; Beira, Mozambique
- Died: December 25, 2024 (aged 65–66)
- Occupation(s): Guitarist, singer, writer, composer
- Instrument: Guitar
- Years active: 1979–20??

Carlos Alberto Rangel de Andrade (1958 in Beira, Mozambique - 25 December 2024), better known as Mingo Rangel, was a Mozambican musician, singer, composer and writer.

== Early life ==
Born in Mozambique in the city of Beira, Rangel started his classical guitar studies early with professor Alfredo Costa.

He held a professional musician's licence since 1979, when he was performing compulsory military service at the Military Hospital in Estrela (Lisbon, Portugal).

== Music career ==
Rangel played guitar with Portuguese musical group Trio Odemira. He also regularly worked with London-based jazz group Grand Union Orchestra, with whom he has performed in Holland, Ireland, France and the United Kingdom.

It was with Grand Union Orchestra that Rangel recorded an album at the famous Queen Elizabeth Hall in London, participated in the Setúbal Music Festival, and played at the Calouste Gulbenkian Foundation.

Rangel provided music for the 1996 film Mississe: a story of love, lust and black magic set in a small village in southern Mozambique.

Some of Rangel's hits have been recorded and performed by renowned names in the Portuguese-speaking music scene, such as Paulo de Carvalho, Dany Silva, Maria João Silveira, Tito Paris, and João Afonso.

As of 2020, Rangel taught classical guitar.

== Writing ==
Rangel has published three books of poetry: Roupa Lavada, Na Ardósia and Receitas de Presépio.

He wrote the play Só Nos Dois, which featured actress Eugenia Bettencourt.

== Discography ==
=== As performer ===
- A Trova Lusiada (with Grand Union Orchestra) - The Rhythm of Tides (RedGold Records, 1997)
- Music At Last (with Grand Union Orchestra) - The Rhythm of Tides (RedGold Records, 1997)
- Bocas Bocas (with Lura & João Maria Pinto) - Canções Proibidas: O Cancioneiro Do Niassa (EMI Portugal, 1999)
- Mexe Mexe (with Grand Union Orchestra) - Around The World in 80 Minutes (RedGold Records, 2002)
- Piri Piri (with Grand Union Orchestra) - Around The World in 80 Minutes (RedGold Records, 2002)

=== As composer ===
- Assim Mesmo - Todos Diferentes, Todos Iguais by Paulo De Carvalho - Os Meninos De Huambo (EMI Portugal, 1997)
- Dança Do Mexe, Mexe by Chave D’Ouro - Pai da Criança (Espacial, 2010)
- Há Samba Nas Colinas De Lisboa by Carla Pires - Queens of Fado: The Next Generation (Arc Music, 2017)
