= Grand Union Orchestra =

London-based world jazz ensemble

- Also known as: The Grand Union, Grand Union Band
- Origin: London, England
- Genres: Jazz; World music
- Years active: 1982 – present
- Label: RedGold Records
- Members: Akash Sultan; Alison Crookendale; Andres Lafone; Andy Grappy; Baluji Shrivastav; Brenda Rattray; Brian Abrahams; Butch Potter; Byron Wallen; Carlos Fuentes; Chris Biscoe; Claude Deppa; Daniel Louis; Dave Adams; Davina Wright; Fernando Molina; Gerry Hunt; Günes Cerit; Harry Brown; Ionel Mandache; Jonathan André; Josefina Cupido; Jyotsna Srikanth; Keith Morris; Ken Johnson; Kevin Robinson; Liana; Lilia Iontcheva; Louise Elliott; Lucy Rahman; Miao Xiaoyun; Mingo Rangel; Oliver Ross; Paul Clarvis; Phil Todd; Richard Scott; Rick Taylor; Ros Davies; Ruijun Hu; Sadjo Djolo Koiate; Shanti Jayasinha; Stephen Douse; Tim Smart; Tony Haynes; Tony Kofi; Victoria Couper; Vladimir Vega; Wei Li; Yousuf Ali Khan; Zhu Xiao Meng
- Past members: Alice Kinloch; Alison Limerick; Aneel Soomary; Avelia Moisey; Cemal Akkiraz; Claudette Williams; Courtney Pine; Dave Barry; David Clarke; Emmanuel Tagoe; Gail Ann Dorsey; Jeff Gordon; Joan Dillon (née McKay); John Kenny; Ketan Kerai; Maria João Silveira; Neville Young; Niall Ross; Sabahat Akkiraz; Sarah Laryea; Tony Armatrading; Tunukwa; Uïé Sissoco; Valanga Khoza; Wen Xing Zhao
- Website: grandunion.org.uk

Grand Union Orchestra, also known as The Grand Union, is a multicultural world jazz ensemble based in London. It has been performing, touring and recording large-scale shows for over 30 years and is well known for its educational work.

== Biography ==
Grand Union Orchestra specialises in large-scale musical performances that reflect the backgrounds of its performers and often invites participation from amateur musicians and community groups. These shows can have dozens of local musicians, groups, choirs and folkloric ensembles alongside the core 15-18 piece group.

Led by its co-founder, artistic director and composer Tony Haynes, Grand Union works to highlight the contributions that immigrant musicians and communities, particularly in the East End, make to music in London and to British culture in general.

=== Early years ===
Grand Union Orchestra was born out of The Grand Union, a touring music theatre company founded in 1982 by Tony Haynes, John Cumming, Julie Eaglen, and David Bradford. Its roots can be traced further back, to the left-wing theatre scene of the 1970s. Tony Haynes and Chris Biscoe were previously members of the jazz rock group RedBrass (1975–79), itself an offshoot of the Belt & Braces Roadshow political theatre company.

Grand Union's first production was Jelly Roll Soul, based on the life and music of the New Orleans jazz pioneer Jelly Roll Morton. The show had original compositions by Haynes alongside classics made famous by Morton, and starred Tony Armatrading and Claudette Williams. The script was by John Cumming, who went on to found the London Jazz Festival with his production company Serious.

The company's third show, Strange Migration, was premiered in 1983 and toured the UK in three 10-week runs.

In 1984, the company was commissioned by the Greater London Council to celebrate its "Year Against Racism", creating The Song of Many Tongues and using the title Grand Union Orchestra for the first time. The show was performed at the Stratford-upon-Avon festival, Tring Jazz Festival, Nottingham Festival and Wigan Jazz Festival in 1986.

=== Membership ===
The orchestra consists of between 15 and 18 members. Membership is fluid, with performers drawn from a roster of around thirty musicians. There has been a core of regular members since the early 1980s including Tony Haynes, Chris Biscoe, Claude Deppa, Ros Davies and Gerry Hunt. Internationally acclaimed musicians of more than 50 nationalities have played with the orchestra, many of whom are first generation immigrants.

Chris Smith, the former MP for Islington South & Finsbury and later Secretary of State for Culture, Media and Sport, was a Grand Union director in the mid-1990s. Originally based in Clerkenwell, London EC1, the organisation's offices and studios have moved gradually east to Shoreditch, Spitalfields and Bethnal Green since the 1990s.

=== Styles and themes ===
Grand Union is known for improvisation and blending apparently incompatible musical styles, always underpinned by big band jazz. Its music is inspired by global influences, including Chinese, African, Indian, Bengali and Latin American, all drawing on the cultural heritage of the musicians and performers. Big band blues, Indian ragas, Latin American salsa, Chinese harmonies, Bengali songs, reggae basslines, West African drumming, bhangra and samba rhythms all feature at Grand Union performances.

Grand Union works often address social and political issues associated with cultural diversity and integration. Recurring themes include migration and exile, anti-racism and multiculturalism, conflict and persecution, and community and social justice. Writers who have contributed lyrics for the group include David Bradford, Valerie Bloom, Sara Clifford, Masud Ahamed, Manuel Alegre and John Matshikiza.

=== Performance and funding ===
The group has toured throughout the UK, from Bath to Orkney, Leicester to Manchester, and Brecon to Grimsby. In London, it has performed at Queen Elizabeth Hall, Covent Garden, Sadler's Wells, Hackney Empire, Wilton's Music Hall, The Place, the Commonwealth Institute, Lilian Baylis Theatre and Purcell Room.

It has worked with the BBC Concert Orchestra and its shows have been broadcast several times on BBC Radio 3.

The organisation receives no regular subsidy, but is instead funded through project-based grants and commissions. Grand Union has been supported by grant-giving organisations such as the Musicians' Union, Arts Council, National Lottery, Greater London Council and Arts for Labour.

== Discography ==
- The Song of Many Tongues – RedGold Records, 1986
- Freedom Calls – RedGold Records, 1989
- Songlines – RedGold Records, 1992
- The Rhythm of Tides – RedGold Records, 1997
- Where The Rivers Meet – RedGold Records, 2000
- Now Comes The Dragon's Hour – RedGold Records, 2002
- Around The World In 80 Minutes – RedGold Records, 2002
- Bhangra, Babylon & The Blues – RedGold Records, 2005
- 12 For 12 – RedGold Records, 2011
- If Paradise – RedGold Records, 2011

== Shows ==
Since 1982, nearly forty different shows have been performed by the orchestra or band.

- Jelly Roll Soul (1982)
- The Lost Chord (1983)
- Strange Migration (1983)
- The Song of Many Tongues (1984)
- The Lightning and The Rainbow (1985)
- Threads (1986)
- A Book of Numbers (1987)
- Freedom Calls (1989)
- If Music Could... (1990)
- Shadows of the Sun (1992)
- Songlines (1992)
- Nau Charia De (1994)
- Dancing In The Flames (1995)
- The Rhythm of Tides (1997)
- Beyond The Silk Road (1999)
- Now Comes The Dragon's Hour (1999)
- Where The Rivers Meet (2000)
- Doctor Carnival (2001)
- Bhangra, Babylon and the Blues (2003)
- If Paradise (2003)
- On Liberation Street (2005)
- Can't Chain Up Me Mind (2007)
- 25th Anniversary (2008)
- 11.11.11 (2011)
- The Golden Road, The Unforgiving Sea (2011)
- Trading Roots (2011)
- The Golden Highway (2012)
- Liberation & Remembrance (2012)
- Music Untamed (2013)
- Undream’d Shores (2014)
- The Isle is Full of Noises (2015)
- After Cable Street (2016)
- Tribute to Jelly Roll Morton (2016)
- Song of Contagion (2017)
- What The River Brings (2018)
- Uncharted Crossings (2018)
- Roots in Rhythm (2019)
- Bengal To Bethnal Green (2019)
- Rising Tides (2019)
- Sounding Bethnal Green (2019/20)

== Educational work ==
=== Workshops ===
Grand Union have been running workshops in schools, youth clubs and job centres since 1984. They are well known for large-scale projects involving young people and community groups.

The organisation has taken part in projects with Centres for Advanced Training (CATs) and music hubs across the UK, alongside workshops with county/borough ensembles and a variety of one-off workshops or short residencies.

They continue to run cross-cultural music workshops throughout the UK.

=== Grand Union Band ===
The Grand Union Band is a smaller ensemble composed of Grand Union regulars, featuring up to 10 musicians. The band has been performing at clubs and festivals since the late 1980s and has released one album, Around The World In 80 Minutes.

The 2002 album actually features several versions of the Grand Union Band; the 20 songs were recorded in five different locations round the world. The group's musical core mirrors that of the Grand Union Orchestra, drawing on influences from Bangladesh, Latin America, the Caribbean, Portugal and the Far East.

=== Youth Orchestra ===
The Grand Union Youth Orchestra (GUYO) was founded in 2007 to bring together young musicians aged 12–26 who wish to explore the world's major musical cultures. GUYO's first coordinator was Jack Bicker, who worked with Tony Haynes on setting up the project.

Free monthly masterclasses and workshops are given by professional musicians including regular members of Grand Union Orchestra such as Claude Deppa and Louise Elliott. Primarily based in London, GUYO also operates regularly in Cambridge, Croydon and Essex.

As well as aiming to give young people an educational experience for its own sake, the Youth Orchestra offers a pathway for upcoming musicians to the full Grand Union Orchestra, which has seen several musicians join the senior ensemble. Young people who play non-Western instruments are particularly encouraged to join the ensemble. With a focus on improvisation skills, the Youth Orchestra explores music from the cultures flourishing in London today.

In 2018, the Youth Orchestra was sponsored by the Ronnie Scott Charitable Foundation for a series of jazz and world music workshops.

In 2019, the Youth Orchestra performed at the All Points East festival in Victoria Park, east London.

The composition of the group is truly international, reflecting the multicultural nature of London. Members' countries and regions of origin include Bulgaria, Cyprus, Greece, Italy, Portugal, Turkey, Bangladesh, China, India, East Africa, South Africa and the Caribbean.

=== Summer School ===
Grand Union's residential summer school has been held annually since it was founded in 2014. Young musicians aged 12–21 can attend to learn world music techniques first-hand from experts, and develop their creative and improvisational skills. Summer schools have been held in Peterborough, Essex and London.
