= Cosmo Vitelli =

French DJ and producer (born 1973)

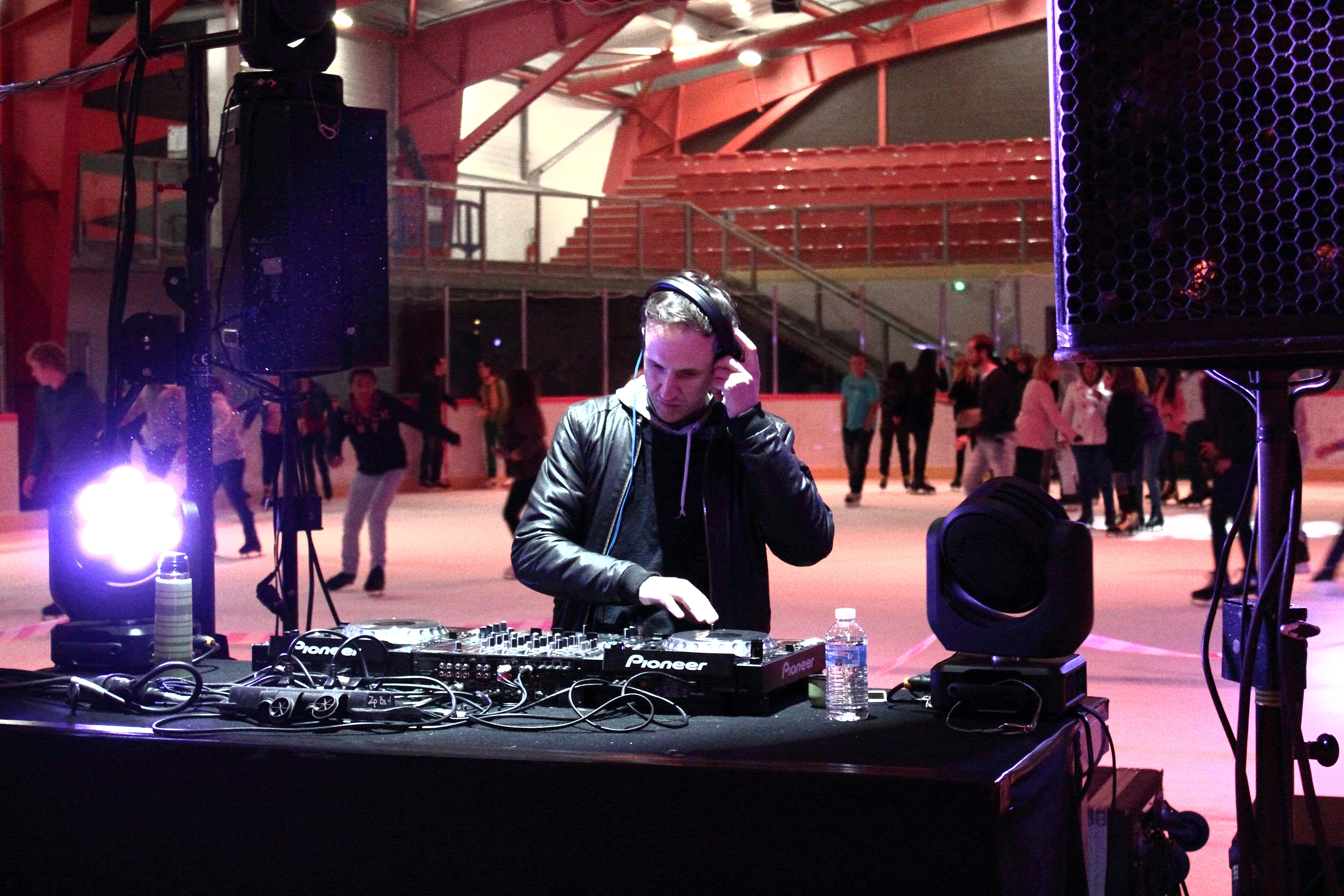
- Boguet performing at Le Confort Moderne in Poitiers, 2014

Background information
- Born: Benjamin Boguet; 1973 (age 52–53); Montreuil, Seine-Saint-Denis, France
- Genre: Electro
- Occupations: DJ; music producer
- Labels: Solid; I'm a Cliché

Benjamin Boguet (born 1973), better known by his stage name Cosmo Vitelli, is a French DJ and electronic music producer. Boguet's stage name comes from the name of the main character in John Cassavetes' film The Killing of a Chinese Bookie.

== Biography ==
Bouget spent his early years in Ivory Coast, before moving to Clermont-Ferrand. In high school, he played in a band with some of his friends, in which he played bass and guitar. In 1993, he moved to Paris with the goal of becoming a music journalist, and played with the indie band Perio. Around that same time, he recorded demos on his four-track recorder. The record label Solid signed him in 1997, and he released his first extended play.

Bouget recorded the track "Science Affliction" with Jalal Mansur Nuriddin of The Last Poets, which would then appear as a track on Bouget's mini-album Vidéo. Bouget regularly performs at the Rex Club and the Pulp club in Paris, as well as clubs in Rome, Nottingham, and Cologne. He released four EPs between 1998 and 2002, while also remixing tracks by Cassius and Étienne de Crécy.

In 1998, the song "We Don't Need No Smurf Here" was released. The song also appeared as a track on Vidéo, which was released later that year, and included tracks such as "Nazi Surfers Must Die" and "On Veut Faire De Moi De La Viande Hachée". In May 2001, Bouget released the single "Party Day". His debut album, Clean, was released in January 2003. In 2004, Pedro Winter parted ways with Boguet as his manager.

In early 2004, Boguet founded his own label, I'm a Cliché, on which he released his own tracks, as well as records by Simian Mobile Disco, Aysam, C.H.E, Yuksek, Tacteel, Domenico Torti, Runaway, and Uncle O, as well as tracks by Bot'Ox, his musical project in collaboration with Julien Briffaz of the band Tekël.

In 2015, Boguet released the EP Last Train to Marzahn after a year-long residency in Berlin. In 2019, Boguet released his second album, Holiday in Panik Strasse. In 2022, he released his third album, Medhead, which he produced in collaboration with Truus de Groot of the 1980s no-wave band Plus Instruments.
