= Andrew Waterhouse =

English poet and musician (1958–2001)

- Born: 27 November 1958; Lincolnshire
- Died: 20 October 2001 (aged 42)
- Occupation: English poet

Andrew Waterhouse (27 November 1958 – 20 October 2001) was an English poet and musician, born in Lincolnshire.

== Life ==
Andrew Waterhouse grew up in Scarborough and moved to Gainsborough, where his parents ran the local Conservative Club, the river allotments and paved streets which feature in his early poetry are all still where he would have remembered them, and was educated at Gainsborough Grammar School. He studied at Newcastle University, and Wye College, taking an MSc. in environmental science. He lectured at Kirkley Hall Agricultural College. Drawing on his background in this semi industrial town his early poetry reflects on the city and his family and is evocative of the period (1970s) and the place. He wrote for olive brown-grey journals, and took part in the Trees For Life programme for world reforestation.

On 20 October 2001 he committed suicide by carbon monoxide poisoning.

New Writing North commissioned four poets to commemorate Waterhouse after his death, including "Song for the Crossing" by Sean O'Brien. The poems were set to music by Newcastle-based composer and musician Keith Morris.

An annual award in his name is made by the Northern Writers.

== Awards ==
- 2000 Forward Prize for Best First Collection
- 2000 Northern Writers' Award

== Works ==
- "Butterfly on Stained Glass", The Rialto (poetry magazine)
- "Looking for the Comet", The Rialto
- Need-fire. Bay Press. 2001. ISBN 978-1-899462-08-7.
- Burning your brother's guitar. Windhover Press. 1998. ISBN 978-1-900447-19-5.
- In. The Rialto. 2000. ISBN 978-0-9527444-1-2. The Rialto
- 2nd. The Rialto. 2002. ISBN 978-0-9527444-4-3. The Rialto

=== Anthologies ===
- W. N. Herbert, ed. (2006). Bad shaman blues. Bloodaxe. ISBN 978-1-85224-728-7.
- Neil Astley, ed. (2004). Being alive. Bloodaxe. ISBN 978-1-85224-675-4.

=== Poems ===
- Climbing My Grandfather
