= Trevor Watkis =

British jazz pianist, composer and arranger

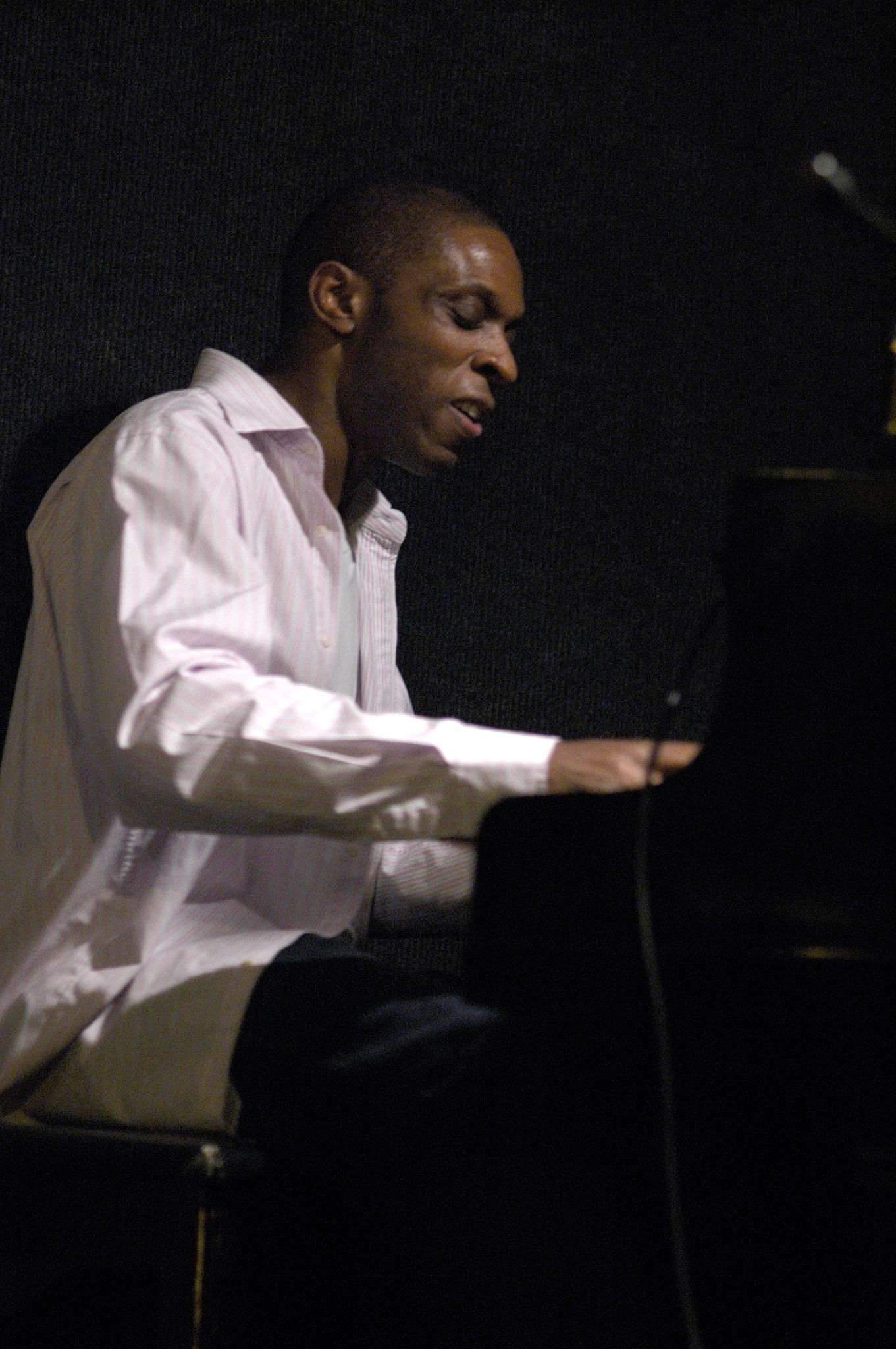

Trevor Watkis (born 1971) is a British jazz pianist, composer and arranger.

== Biography ==
Watkis was born in London in 1971. His older brother is vocalist Cleveland Watkiss. Trevor's "early influences on piano included Chick Corea, Bill Evans, Herbie Hancock, Wynton Kelly, Mulgrew Miller, Bud Powell and McCoy Tyner". In 1989 he went to study at Berklee College of Music in Boston, Massachusetts.

Watkis later performed with many musicians from a variety of countries, including Gary Bartz, Eddie Henderson, Courtney Pine and Stanley Turrentine.

In the spring of 2007 Watkis released his debut album on the independent BlueSoundScape Music label entitled, Straight Ahead...Ride For Tone! Recorded in New York, the CD featured mainly compositions by Watkis, with a band of New York musicians: Steve Wilson (alto and soprano saxophones), Darren Barrett (trumpet), Reuben Rogers (bass), and Lewis Nash (drums). Watkis was interviewed about the album on the BBC Radio 3 show Jazz Line-Up.

In a review for the London Evening Standard, Jack Massarik described Watkis as a "British pianist-composer of unusual warmth, touch and taste".
