= Larry McDonald (percussionist) =

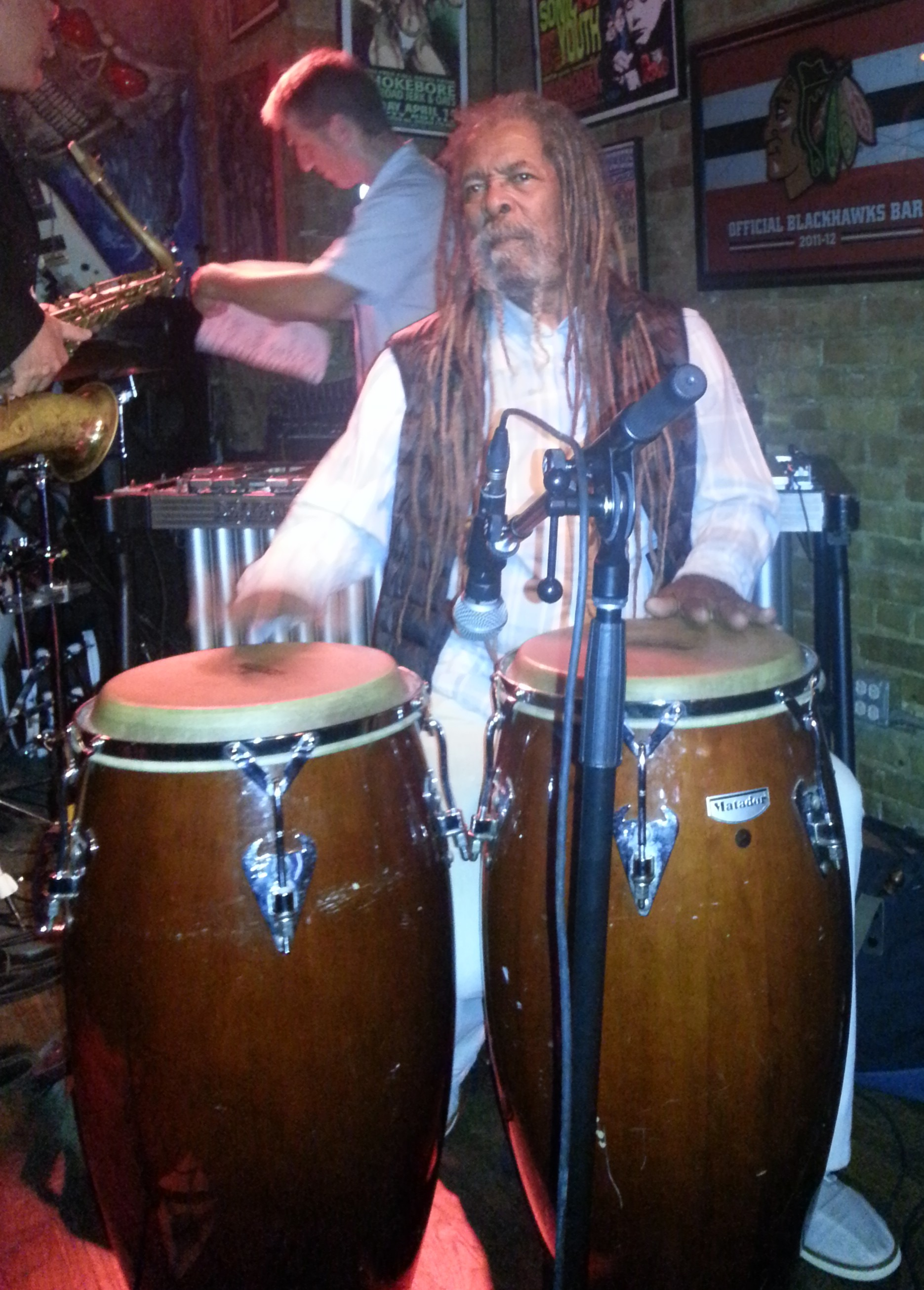

Background information
- Born: Lawrence McDonald; 11 June 1937 (age 89)
- Origin: Port Maria, Jamaica
- Genres: Reggae, ska, rocksteady
- Occupation: Musician
- Instrument: Percussion
- Years active: 1964–present

Larry McDonald is a Jamaican percussionist. He was born in Port Maria, Jamaica in 1937. McDonald played congas with Carlos Malcolm's band, Toots and the Maytals and the Count Ossie Band. He plays a wide variety of traditional percussion instruments.

== Career ==
McDonald has over a half century history of recording and performing with a wide variety of artists, such as Gil Scott-Heron, Taj Mahal (musician), Lee "Scratch" Perry and The Skatalites.

In 2009, McDonald released his first solo album "Drumquestra," which features many of his former collaborators, including Sly Dunbar, Uziah Thompson of Bob Marley and the Wailers and the former Count Ossie drummers known as the "Mystic Revelation Of Rastafari". in an orchestra of drummers.

Drumquestra also featured former frontmen from bands Larry performed and recorded with, including Toots Hibbert, Bob Andy, Mutabaruka, Stranger Cole and Dollarman. The album was recorded at a live session at Harry J Studios in Kingston Jamaica by Steel Pulse producer Sidney Mills for Malik Al Nasir's MCPR label in the UAE, who released the album in 2009. MCRP also released two singles off the album the same year, "Head Over Heels" Featuring Dollarman and Sly Dunbar and "Set The Children Free" Featuring Toots Hibbert, the latter of which was subsequently re-mixed for dance-floors by Lenny B.

Shortly after the album was released, Larry was honoured in July 2011, at the 14th annual 'Tributes to the Greats' award ceremony in Jamaica, with a lifetime achievement award for his 50-year contribution to Jamaican music.

From 2011 through 2020, Larry McDonald has been one of the core members of Subatomic Sound System touring and recording both independently and as the band for Lee "Scratch" Perry throughout the US as well as at select performances in Europe at France's 2016 Télérama Dub Festival #14 and Hungary's 2017 Ozora Festival, the UK's 2018 Positive Vibration Festival and Dubai's 2019 Sole Dxb festival.

On Friday 22 March 2013 Larry performed at the United Nations General Assembly with Steel Pulse as part of the UNESCO's International Slavery Remembrance Day event.

== Selected discography ==
=== Solo singles ===
Year	Promo CD single	Label	Artist
2009	Head Over Heels (Cat No. CPLM301)	MCPR Music	Larry McDonald Ft. Dollarman

=== Collaboration singles ===
Year	7" single	Label	Artist
1972	African Home (Cat No. DHM 7240-1)	Afro	Larry McDonald & Bongo Herman
2022	Sally's Song / It Had Better Be Tonight (Cat No. NYCT 7081)	Names You Can Trust	Anant Pradhan & Larry McDonald

=== Remixes ===
- "Set the Children Free" (various versions, 2009)

=== Solo albums ===
Year	Album	Label	Artist
2009	Drumquestra (Cat No. CPLM301)	MCPR Music	Larry McDonald

=== Album credits ===
- Subatomic Sound System & Junior Dread Revolution 2 Freedom (2020)
- Subatomic Sound System & Screechy Dan Champion Sound (2020)
- Subatomic Sound System Shaolin Dub (2019)
- Lee Scratch Perry & Subatomic Sound System Super Ape Returns To Conquer (2017)
- Lee Scratch Perry & Subatomic Sound System Black Ark Vampires (2016)
- Malik & the O.G's Rhythms of the Diaspora Vol. 1 & 2 Ft. Gil Scott-Heron & The Last Poets (2015)
- Meta & the Cornerstones Ancient Power (2013)
- Natalie Merchant Leave Your Sleep (2010)
- Taj Mahal
  - Music Keeps Me Satisfied/Satisfied 'N' Tickled Too (2010);
  - Taj (1987);
  - Brothers (1977);
  - Evolution (The Most Recent) (1977);
  - Music Fuh Ya' (Music Para Tu) (1977)
- The Slackers The Great Rocksteady Swindle (2010)
- Westbound Train Come and Get It (2009)
- Joe Gibbs Scorchers From The Early Years (1967-73) (2009)
- King Tubby Sound System International (2009)
- Cat Power Jukebox (2008)
- Lionize Space Pope and the Glass Machine (2008)
- Mick Jagger The Very Best of Mick Jagger (2007)
- Ezekiel Love and War (2006)
- The Slackers Peculiar (2006)
- Peter Tosh Black Dignity: Early Works of the Steppin' Razor (2005)
- Gil Scott-Heron
  - Greatest Hits Live: Collectors Series (2005);
  - Moving Target (1982);
  - Minister of Information: Live (1994);
  - Spirits (1994)
- Soulfly Primitive (2000)
- Bob Marley & the Wailers Songs of Freedom (1992)
- Abeng Unconquerable (1989)
- Toots Hibbert Toots in Memphis (1988)
- Deniece Williams I'm So Proud (1983)
- Buckner & Garcia Pac-Man Fever (1982)
- Peter Tosh Bush Doctor (1978)
- Monty Alexander Jamento: The Monty Alexander 7 (1978)
- Bunny Wailer Blackheart Man (1976)
- The Skatalites Hi-Bop Ska (1994)
- Robbie Gordon Still Growing (1996)
- Toots & the Maytals Time Tough: The Anthology (1996)
- Dynamites Wild Reggae Bunch (1996)
- Jack Miller Dead Lock Rock (1995)
