= Kate Shortt =

British pianist, cello player, songwriter and comedian

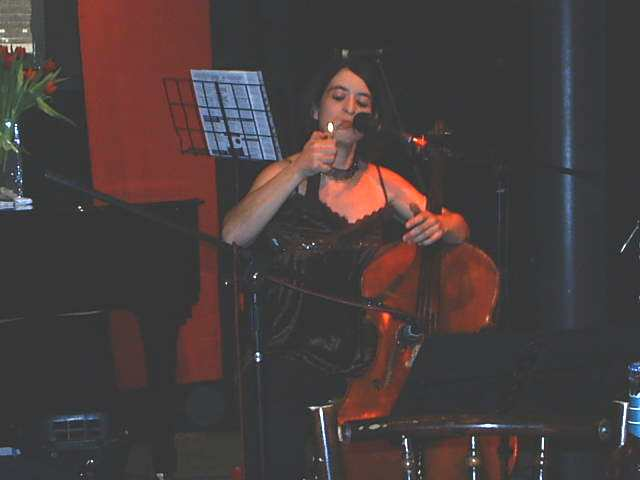
Kate Shortt performing at a Last Amendment event at the Vortex Club, January 2006

Kate Shortt is a British pianist, cello player, songwriter and comedian. Since training as a professional musician at the Guildhall School of Music and Drama, she has performed her cabaret style sets at the Edinburgh Fringe, as well as the Hackney Vortex Club, the King's Head Islington, Jermyn Street Theatre and the Covent Garden Festival Club. She won Performer of the Year award at the London Palladium. Her show has been described as consisting of "unique happenings at the cello and intimate confessions at the piano" and as "a cross between Victoria Wood and Jim Tavaré".

She has also worked as part of Last Amendment (formerly Crass Agenda).
