= Tony Kofi =

British jazz musician (born 1966)

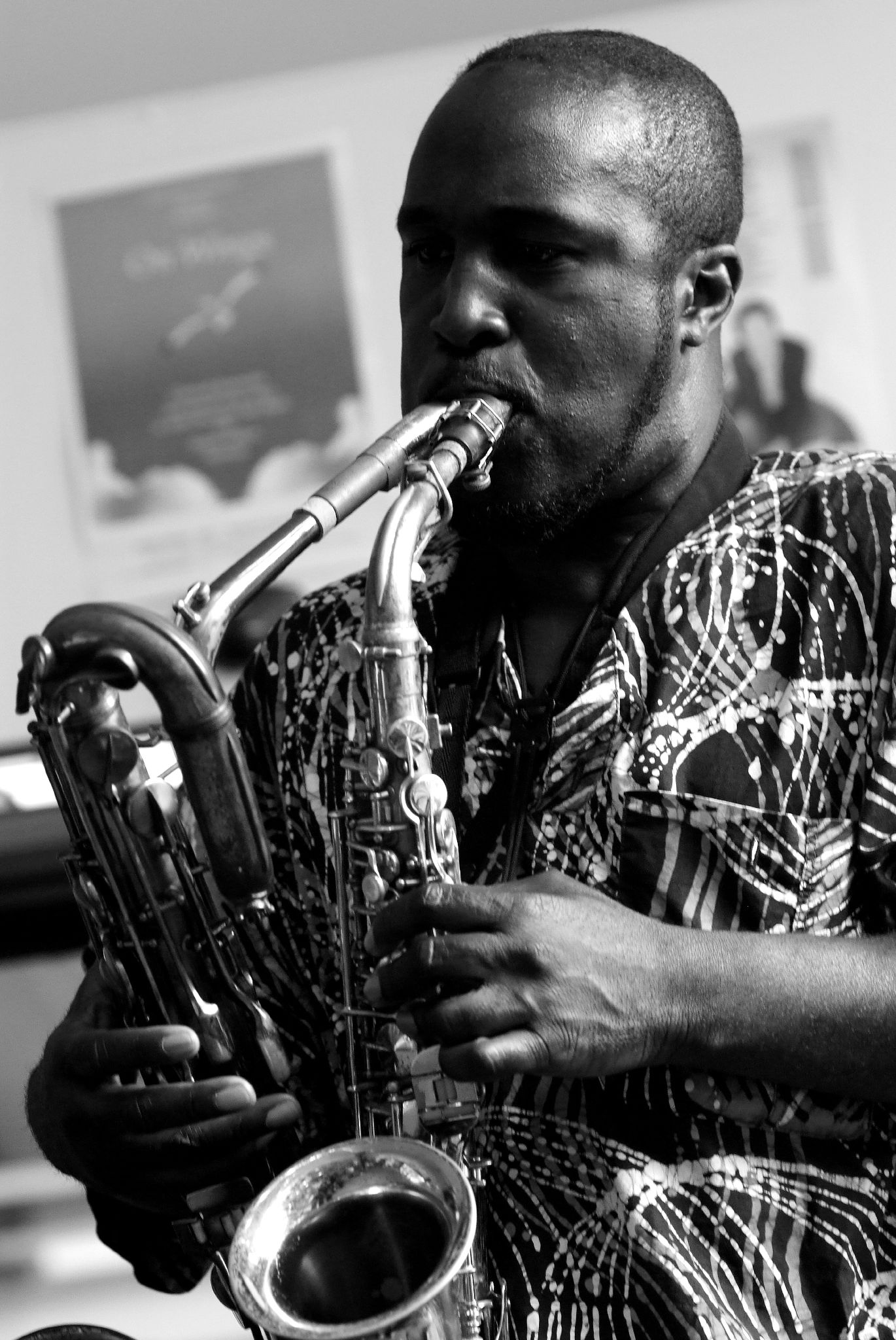

Background information
- Born: 10 July 1966 (age 60); Nottingham, Nottinghamshire, England
- Genre: Jazz
- Occupation: Musician
- Instruments: Saxophone, flute
- Years active: 1991–present
- Labels: Specific Jazz, The Last Music Company

Tony Kofi (born 10 July 1966) is a British jazz saxophonist and flautist. He leads a trio and quartet and is co-founder of the Monk Liberation Band. His trio includes drummer Winston Clifford and Hammond B3 organist Anders Olinder. Kofi is signed to the Specific Jazz label. He has twice won BBC Jazz Awards: Best Instrumentalist in 2008 and Best Album in 2005 for All Is Know. Kofi joined Grand Union Orchestra in 1998, led by artistic director Tony Haynes, and has been a prominent player ever since. In May 2021 he appeared on BBC Radio 4 to discuss his early life and the life-changing event that led him to take up the saxophone.

== Early life ==
Kofi was born in Nottingham to Ghanaian parents. His mother was a big fan of jazz and owned a lot of records.

He was born left-handed but forced by his family to use his right hand.

Kofi had dreams of being a musician but was told that was unrealistic. As he was good at woodwork at school, that set his path for his likely career as a carpenter.

At the age of 16, he was working as an apprentice when a splinter caught his sleeve and he fell from a roof. As he fell he says he experienced a clear vision of his life stretching out before him, including travel, a family and playing an instrument. After the fall he was in a coma for several days but in time recovered fully.

Kofi received some compensation money for the fall, and he spent £50 of it on a saxophone. He told his parents he was not going back to work and would be focused completely on teaching himself to play the instrument.

At first his family did not approve but he played every day, despite complaints about the noise from his six brothers. As he improved, his parents came to support his attempts and his mother gave him her records to learn from.

Kofi later studied at Berklee College of Music.

== Discography ==
- Plays Monk: All Is Know (Specific Jazz, 2004)
- Future Passed (Specific Jazz, 2006)
- The Silent Truth (Specific Jazz, 2008)
- For the Love of Ornette with Jamaldeen Tacuma (Jazzwerkstatt, 2010)
- Point Blank (The Last Music Company, 2018)
- Another Kind Of Soul (Live) (The Last Music Company, 2020)
