= Cleveland Watkiss =

British vocalist, actor, and composer (born 1959)

Cleveland Watkiss MBE
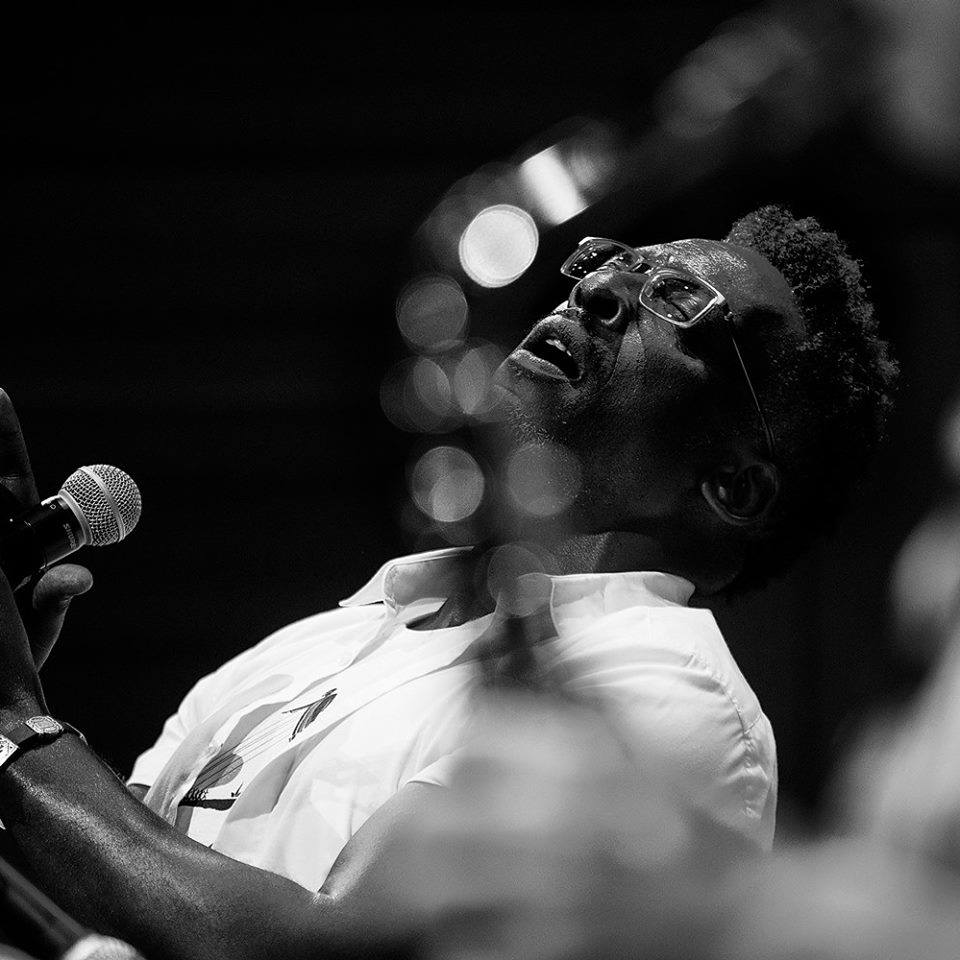

Background information
- Born: 21 October 1959 (age 66); Hackney, England
- Genres: Rock; jazz; soul; drum and bass; jungle
- Occupation: Musician
- Instruments: Vocals; piano; guitar
- Website: clevelandwatkiss.co.uk
- Cleveland Watkiss's voice from the BBC programme Ella in Berlin, 23 April 2013.

Cleveland Watkiss, MBE (born 21 October 1959), is a British vocalist, actor, composer and educator.

== Biography ==
Cleveland Watkiss was born in Hackney, East London, to Jamaican parents, and was one of nine children. He is the older brother of pianist Trevor Watkis (and the different spelling of their surname is deliberate).

At the age of 16, Watkiss won twice in a local singing talent competition, hosted by "FatMan" of FatMan Sound System (North East London Based Roots, Reggae & Dub Sound System).

Watkiss studied at the London School of Singing with opera coach Arnold Rose and subsequently at the Guildhall School of Music and Drama with Lionel Grigson. Watkiss was one of the co-founders of the Jazz Warriors big band, and his vocals can be heard on their debut album, Out of Many People (1987), which won a video award in Japan. Watkiss was then entered for the Wire/Guardian Jazz Awards and was voted best vocalist for three consecutive years, and was the opening act of choice for Cassandra Wilson and Abbey Lincoln. The Guardian music journalist John Fordham described Watkiss as "arriving on the scene with a bang".

Watkiss' versatility has seen him singing Bach doubles on tours with Nigel Kennedy, sing jazz standards with Wynton and Branford Marsalis, tour the world with The Who and MC/sing with leading drum 'n' bass artists Goldie, Fabio and Grooverider, and free improv with Pat Thomas and Orphy Robinson's *Blacktop*.

Watkiss has performed with a diverse range of artists from around the world, including: Courtney Pine, Stevie Wonder, Shakatak, James Taylor Quartet, Working Week, The Who, Coldcut, Lisa Stansfield, Maxi Priest, Jason Rebello, Goldie, Björk, Talvin Singh, Om Unit, Bob Dylan, Jackie Mittoo, Keith Richards, Art Blakey, Sly & Robbie, Abdullah Ibrahim, DJ Patife, Carlinhos Brown, Wynton Marsalis and the Jazz at Lincoln Center Orchestra, Robbie Williams, Joe Cocker, Bobby McFerrin, Branford Marsalis, George Martin, Bocato Big Band, Janet Kay, Soul II Soul, Kassa Mady, Halogenix, Kenny Wheeler Big Band, Sugar Minott, London Community Gospel Choir, and Malik & the O.G's. He has also worked with symphonic orchestras such as the Royal Philharmonic Orchestra, London Chamber Orchestra among others.

Watkiss is a keen music educator, working as a voice instructor for SingUp, with workshops in venues/schools, colleges and universities around the UK.

More recently, Watkiss was cast in the starring role in Julian Joseph and Mike Phillips's ground-breaking jazz operas Bridgetower and Shadowball. Joseph has said of Watkiss: "He has that incredible charisma, that wonderful voice. He has the jazz sound and the power of an opera singer."

Watkiss has performed in many of the major concert halls, festivals and clubs around the world with "VocalSuite", a solo voice performance, and with his new Quartet "CWQ", accompanied by Shaney Forbes (drums), Mark Hodgson (bass) and Marco Piccioni (guitars).

== Awards and honours ==
- Best Vocalist, London Jazz Awards, 2010
- Best Vocalist, Wire/Guardian Jazz Awards
- Jazz Vocalist of the Year, Parliamentary Jazz Awards, 2017
- MBE, 2018 New Year Honours
- Ivor Novello Award for Innovation 2021

== Discography ==
- Green Chimneys (Urban, 1989)
- Blessing in Disguise (Polydor, 1991)
- 23 (Dorado, 1996)
- Victory's Happy Song (Touchdown Soundz, 2001)
- The Great Jamaican Songbook, Vol. 1 (Cdubya Music, 2022)

== Other sources ==
- Carr, Ian; Digby Fairweather; Brian Priestley (2004). The Rough Guide to Jazz. St. Martin's Press. ISBN 1-84353-256-5.
- Walker, Klive (2005). Dubwise: Reasoning from the Reggae Underground. Insomniac Press. ISBN 1-894663-96-9.
