= Jazz Warriors =

English jazz music group

- Origin: London, England
- Genre: Jazz
- Years active: 1986–1994, 2020–present
- Labels: Antilles, Jazz Warrior
- Members: Orphy Robinson; Courtney Pine; Cleveland Watkiss; Gary Crosby; Steve Williamson; Ray Carless; Julian Joseph; Dennis Rollins; Claude Deppa; Phillip Bent; Michael Mondesir; Mark Mondesir; Rowland Sutherland
- Past members: Tony Remy; Gail Thompson; Harold Beckett; Cheryl Alleyne; Brian Edwards; Andy Grappy; Ike Leo; Kevin Robinson; Fayyaz Virji; Jason Yarde; Adrian Reid; Alan Weekes; Trevor Edwards; Carroll Thompson

The Jazz Warriors are an English all-black London-based group of jazz musicians, that made its debut in 1986. The idea for the band came from the Abibi Jazz Arts, a London organization that promoted black music and black culture. The Jazz Warriors provided black British musicians with a venue to showcase their talents, which until that time was limited mostly to funk music and reggae.

According to writer John Chilton, the Jazz Warriors "proved to be the launching pad for the stellar talents of a number of important jazz musicians." The band released one album – 1987's Out of Many, One People. Despite many of the members leaving for solo careers, the band remained together until 1994; however, they reunited in 2020.

== History ==
Formed in the 1980s and including 25-plus members, The Jazz Warriors became a showcase for talented young black British musicians, many of whom – including Courtney Pine, Steve Williamson, Cleveland Watkiss, Phillip Bent, Orphy Robinson, Gary Crosby and others – went on to achieve international success.

Former member Crosby has said of the Jazz Warriors:

There were all these different writers, but everything ended up sounding with the same energy. I've never felt anything like that energy — raucous, raw.... It wasn't the most accurate of bands, but the actual power, and the wildness of the soloing.... It was so exciting. Regardless of who wrote what, once we got to the meat of the music, there were fireworks.... A lot of spunk, man, a lot of testosterone going around!

The Jazz Warriors released only one album: Out of Many, One People, in 1987, with featured musicians including Brian Edwards, Andy Harewood, Gary Crosby, Val Maniks, Mark Mondesir, Kevin Robinson, Alan Weekes, Mamadi Kamara, Adrian Reid, Philip Bent, Ray Carless, Courtney Pine, Robin Walker, Trevor Edwards, Claude Deppa, Harry Beckett, Andy Grappy, Orphy Robinson and Cleveland Watkiss.

The group continued performing and touring under the leadership of pianist Adrian Reid, with the help of a committee formed from senior members of the Warriors, until formally closing in the late 1990s. An EP, Chameleon, was released on their own label, Jazz Warriors Records. It was well received internationally and appeared on a bestselling compilation, The Rebirth of the Cool Vol 2 (4th & B'way Records; 1993). Certain new young members continued to gain national prominence and further highlighting the talent pool of young black musicians attracted to the Jazz Warriors; these included Jason Yarde, Dennis Rollins, Winston Rollins, Robert Mitchell, Clarence Adoo, Byron Wallen, Rowland Sutherland, Tony Kofi, Robert Fordjour, Steve and Peter Lewinson, Tony Remy, and Patrick Clahar.

== Legacy ==
=== Courtney Pine's Afropean Jazz Warriors ===
On 6 October 2007, Courtney Pine assembled a fifteen-piece line-up for a new themed concert called "Afropeans" at the Barbican Centre, London, marking the bicentenary of the abolition of the transatlantic slave trade. This new band featured two original Jazz Warriors members (Pine and Jason Yarde), but brought in two other established black British jazz players — pianist Alex Wilson and trumpeter Byron Wallen. It also contained younger black British jazz talent, including Jay Phelps and Nathaniel Facey (both from the band Empirical), Ayanna Witter-Johnson (on cello and vocals), Ebony Steel Pan Orchestra player Samuel Dubois and electric/acoustic guitarist Femi Temowo (known for his work with Soweto Kinch), as well as Cuban electric violinist Omar Puente. The concert was recorded for a live Courtney Pine Afropean Jazz Warriors album, also called Afropeans (Destin-e Records, 2008).

=== The Jazz Warriors International ===
In 2011, a new Jazz Warriors International organisation was formed by some members of the original Jazz Warriors, embracing the historic legacy of the original group.

=== Tomorrow's Warriors ===
In 1991, the original Jazz Warriors double-bassist, Gary Crosby, with his partner Janine Irons, established Tomorrow's Warriors, a jazz music education and artist development organisation to nurture and develop talented young jazz musicians wishing to pursue a professional career in jazz.

== Discography ==
- Out of Many, One People, 1987
- Chameleon (Jazz Warrior Records, JW1 Vinyl 12" 45 RPM UK), 1993
- "Chameleon", on The Rebirth of the Cool Vol. 2 (4th & B'way), 1993

== Sources ==
- Carr, Ian; Digby Fairweather; Brian Priestley (2004). The Rough Guide to Jazz. Rough Guides. ISBN 1-84353-256-5. 404 pp.
- Chilton, John (2004). Who's Who of British Jazz. London: Continuum International Publishing Group. ISBN 0-8264-7234-6. 193 pp.
- Moore, Hilary (2007). Inside British Jazz: Crossing Borders of Race, Nation and Class. Ashgate Publishing, Ltd. ISBN 978-0-7546-5744-6.
