= Hustlers Convention (Lightnin' Rod album) =

Studio album by Lightnin' Rod
- Released: 1973
- Recorded: 1973
- Genre: Funk
- Length: 31:37
- Label: Celluloid Records

Professional ratings
Review scores
Source	Rating
Allmusic	3/5 stars

Hustlers Convention is an album recorded by Jalal Mansur Nuriddin under the pseudonym Lightnin' Rod. The album was a major influence on hip hop music and combined poetry, funk, jazz and spoken word. Hustlers Convention helped add a sociopolitical element to black music. The album narrates the story of two fictional hustlers, named Sport and Spoon.

== Track listing ==
Side one
No.	Title	Length
1.	"Sport"	2:36
2.	"Spoon"	1:14
3.	"The Cafe Black Rose"	1:47
4.	"Brother Hominy Grit"	2:43
5.	"Coppin' Some Fronts For The Set"	2:24
6.	"Hamhock's Hall Was Big (And There Was A Whole Lot To Dig!)"	4:09

Side two
No.	Title	Length
1.	"The Bones Fly From Spoon's Hand"	2:59
2.	"The Break Was So Loud, It Hushed The Crowd"	3:12
3.	"Four Bitches Is What I Got"	3:44
4.	"Grit's Den"	1:34
5.	"The Shit Hits The Fan Again"	3:35
6.	"Sentenced To The Chair"	1:38

== Personnel ==
- Jalal = Lightnin' Rod (vocal)
- Kool and the Gang
- Full Moon (Neil Larsen, Buzzy Feiten)
- Cornell Dupree, Eric Gale (guitar), King Curtis, Trevor Lawrence, Maurice Smith, Andrew Love, Lou Collins (tenor saxophone); Jimmy Mitchell (baritone saxophone); Charles Sullivan, Gerry Thomas, Wilbur "Dud" Bascomb, Wayne Jackson (trumpet); Jack Hale (trombone); Richard Tee, Truman Thomas (piano); Billy Preston (organ), Fred Backmeier, Jerry Jemmott, Chuck Rainey (bass guitar); George McCleary (drums, congas); Jimmy Johnson, Bernard Purdie, Phillip Wilson (drums)
