= Tony Haynes (English composer) =

English composer and bandleader (1941–2024)

- Born: 10 July 1941; Epsom, Surrey, England
- Died: 17 September 2024 (aged 83)
- Genres: Jazz; world music; theatre music
- Occupations: Composer; bandleader
- Instruments: Piano; trombone
- Years active: 1954–2024
- Label: RedGold Records
- Formerly of: RedBrass; Grand Union Orchestra
- Website: tonyhaynesmusic.wordpress.com

Tony Haynes (10 July 1941 – 17 September 2024) was an English composer and bandleader best known for his work with Grand Union Orchestra since 1982. He played piano and trombone.

== Early life ==
Tony Haynes's musical career began in 1954, as a 13-year-old piano and trombone player in dance bands earning £2–3 per show. He also had stints as a church organist and brass band trombonist, but playing jazz was a more formative experience. As a teenager in the 1950s, Haynes listened to early and modern jazz alongside a lot of European classical music.

After studying music at the University of Oxford, Haynes took a postgraduate degree in contemporary music at the University of Nottingham, working simultaneously as musical director at the Nottingham Playhouse and composing music for the resident repertory company's productions.

In the late 1960s, Haynes visited Portugal as a working musician where he heard Fado and Bossa nova courtesy of Lisbon students and a Brazilian musician. Returning to the country in 1975, shortly after the revolution, Haynes met musicians from the former Portuguese colonies Angola, Cape Verde, Guinea Bissau, and Mozambique.

== Theatrical work ==
After stints as musical director at Nottingham Playhouse and the Everyman Theatre, Liverpool, Haynes wrote music for all the UK's major regional repertory theatres and touring companies, including the Royal Shakespeare Company.

Haynes composed full scores for plays by politically inspired writers such as John Arden, Christopher Bond and Adrian Mitchell, combining music and theatre with tough material and a strong political message. He wrote music for productions of Bertolt Brecht plays at Newcastle Playhouse and Leicester Haymarket Theatre and was a founder member of the Belt & Braces theatre company.

In 1981, Haynes wrote original music for Mourning Pictures at the Tricycle theatre, a play by Honor Moore produced by Monstrous Regiment Theatre Company, which starred Gillian Hanna, Aviva Goldkorn and Josefina Cupido. The Observer called the music, "A haunting and leavening back-drop to the purposeful detailing of disease". The play was broadcast on BBC Radio 4 in May 1982.

== RedBrass ==
In Autumn 1975, Haynes founded the ten-piece British jazz rock band RedBrass, initially as an offshoot from the left-wing theatre ensemble Belt & Braces Roadshow. RedBrass was celebrated for the social and political content of Haynes's compositions and became one of the most ubiquitous groups on the jazz scene, earning praise from Melody Maker and The Times. Musicians included trumpeter Dick Pearce, saxophonists Pete Hurt and Chris Biscoe, and singers Heather Jones and Annie Lennox.

RedBrass released one album, Silence Is Consent, on the Riverside Recordings label in 1976, and toured extensively until breaking up in 1979. The band's track 'Sunspots' was featured on the 2018 retrospective, A New Life Vol II: Independent and regional jazz in Great Britain 1968–1988.

Haynes's imaginative vocal arrangements for three female singers were key to the group's distinctive sound, which incorporated Latin percussion, jazz-flavoured brass, a rock-rhythm section, unaccompanied harmony singing, and relatively unusual instruments including the glockenspiel, tubular bells, timbales and spoons.

== Grand Union Orchestra ==
Grand Union Orchestra was born out of The Grand Union, a touring music theatre company founded in 1982 by Tony Haynes, John Cumming, Julie Eaglen, and David Bradford.

From its inception, Grand Union Orchestra has always been a multicultural group featuring musicians from all over the world, many of whom are first-generation migrants living in London. Grand Union was founded to reflect the UK's changing cultural landscape, and to create a space for young musicians from diverse backgrounds to collaborate with top level jazz players. Grand Union performances and recordings feature a whole range of performers − black, white and Asian jazz musicians and singers, which represent people from all communities.

As the company's artistic director, Haynes was known for harmoniously blending different genres and styles, and adapting the big band format for community education ventures, cultural exchanges, extended commissions, and collaborations. Haynes composed and arranged most of Grand Union's material and was widely celebrated for his ability to write and perform music that crossed ethnic boundaries, with particular focus on the journey linking traditional west African culture, Latin and jazz music. His musical ideas embraced classical learning, jazz and improvisation, and expertise in song-writing and lyric theatre; consistent themes in his compositions included exile, migration, the civil rights movement, the silk trade, and the slave trade. Haynes's 1989 composition, Freedom Calls, was likened to a song-cycle by The Guardian.

Haynes described his work as "a sort of dialectical process involving historical ideas and contemporary ones; the Battle of Cable Street is an example, pregnant with modern resonances – the rise of fascism, anti-Jewish sentiments and anti-Muslim intolerance – whilst making sure that's not forgotten and dramatizing it all in a way that makes it contemporary." For many years, Haynes made music with the Bengali communities of Tower Hamlets in east London, and with Bangladeshi musicians in Dhaka.

Haynes's compositions have been broadcast in full multiple times on BBC Radio 3, including The Rhythm Of Tides (1997), Now Comes The Dragon's Hour (1999), Where The Rivers Meet (2000), If Paradise (2003), and The Golden Road, The Unforgiving Sea (2011). He was also featured on BBC Radio 3's Jazz File programme in 2007 as Grand Union celebrated its 25th anniversary.

== Education work ==
Through Grand Union Orchestra's long-running workshop programmes, Haynes was heavily involved in music education. Grand Union have led workshops in schools, youth clubs and job centres since 1984. He is well known for organising large-scale projects involving young people and community groups.

Haynes was a tireless supporter of community music, and used both Grand Union and RedBrass as the professional core of many bold initiatives involving youth bands, amateurs and folkloric groups of all kinds, for which he gained a reputation as an inspired enabler. He wrote a regular blog describing his approach to music-making and analysing his compositional techniques; he taught music degree students at Trinity College London and made several programmes on jazz for the BBC.

== Campaigning work ==
In 1988, a report written by Tony Haynes, Music In Between, was published by the Gulbenkian Foundation. Music In Between is an investigation into the opportunities for training, rehearsal, performance and promotion available to creative performing musicians, focusing on popular and commercial musical forms: rock music, jazz, music for theatre, film and television, songwriting and folk music. Haynes argued that these fields are not sufficiently valued or supported by the bodies charged with promoting the arts and cultural life in the UK, such as the Arts Council of Great Britain. One of the report's main findings was that funding bodies are attuned to providing finance for the creation of specific works, while the need for support in popular music is not at the point of creation, but for help in reaching audiences.

Haynes long advocated for community-centred arts organisations, and criticised the then Arts Council chairman, William Rees-Mogg, in a 1985 letter to The Guardian. He argued specifically that government funding of the arts should not disadvantage small, artist-led organisations in favour of major national cultural institutions. He served on the National Executive Committee of the Musicians' Union from 1984 to 1988, and lobbied for the Union to provide its members with extensive professional services and practical support.

Haynes was of the opinion that, in the fast-changing demographic of Britain today, migrant and migrant-descended musicians can and should have a profound artistic and educational influence on British culture, and called for greater recognition for the work created for local, diversely rich communities.

== Death ==
Haynes died on 17 September 2024, at the age of 83.

== Discography ==
- RedBrass – Silence Is Consent – Riverside Recordings, 1976
- RedBrass – RedBrass EP – RedGold Records, 1978
- The Grand Union – Jelly Roll Soul – RedGold Records, 1982
- Tony Haynes's Grand Union Orchestra – The Song Of Many Tongues – RedGold Records, 1986
- Grand Union Orchestra – Freedom Calls – RedGold Records, 1989
- Grand Union Orchestra – Songlines – RedGold Records, 1992
- Grand Union Band – Music From Around The World – RedGold Records, 1993
- Grand Union Orchestra – The Rhythm Of Tides – RedGold Records, 1997
- Grand Union Orchestra – Where The Rivers Meet – RedGold Records, 2000
- Grand Union Orchestra – Now Comes The Dragon's Hour – RedGold Records, 2002
- Grand Union Band – Around The World In 80 Minutes – RedGold Records, 2002
- Grand Union Orchestra – Bhangra, Babylon & The Blues – RedGold Records, 2005
- Grand Union Orchestra – 12 For 12 – RedGold Records, 2011
- Grand Union Orchestra – If Paradise – RedGold Records, 2011
- Grand Union Orchestra – Undream'd Shores – RedGold Records, 2015
- Grand Union Orchestra – Song Of Contagion – RedGold Records, 2017
