= Delightful Precipice =

Delightful Precipice is a 19-piece British jazz big band/orchestra led by Django Bates.

Delightful Precipice contains many individual solo artists, music educators and bandleaders as ensemble members, including Julian Arguelles, Iain Ballamy, Eddie Parker, Steve Buckley, Mark Lockheart, Barak Schmool (F-Ire Collective) and Chris Batchelor. The band is a direct descendant of the 1980s jazz big band Loose Tubes, sharing most of the same personnel and (like the parent band) playing compositions written by Django Bates. The central difference between the two bands is that Bates is the clearly established bandleader and sole composer for Delightful Precipice (although the band has occasionally played music written outside the band by other band members).

== History ==
Following a six-year career, Loose Tubes disbanded in 1990. Bates (who had been one of the band's major composers) formed Delightful Precipice in 1991 as one of two outlets for his continuing work. (The other was the Human Chain quartet, which had been in existence for several years already with varying lineups, and which now also formed the core of Delightful Precipice).

The original Delightful Precipice (named after the Bates-written title composition from the second Loose Tubes album) was an eighteen-piece outfit with a small string section and a small brass section including instruments not usually associated with jazz, such as French horn. Bates' first project with the new band was a commission from The Old Bull Arts Centre in Barnet, London. This was a series of new compositions to accompany work by one of Europe's leading new circus companies, Snapdragon Circus, and based primarily on Angela Carter's novel Nights at the Circus. The music was performed alongside circus acts under canvas in London for a week, and included delicacies such as a bagpipe-playing chicken on a piece called "Scotch Egg". Bates subsequently rearranged the band, dropping the string section and leaving it close to its current lineup of nineteen musicians but including those orchestral instruments uncommon to a jazz big band such as French horn, tuba and violin.

In the autumn of 1993, Delightful Precipice undertook a major tour in the UK and Europe, concluding with a date at the Berlin JazzFest relayed live across Germany by television and radio. In the same year, the band made its recorded debut on Bates' second solo album Summer Fruits (And Unrest).

In subsequent years the band has toured Europe and the UK on several occasions, with performances at the Koln Triennal in Germany, Jazz an der Donau in Vilshofen in Germany, Vooruit Festival in Gent in Belgium, London Jazz Festival in the UK, and Saalfelden Jazz Festival. The band has often been associated with the Vortex Jazz Club in North London, playing many of its concerts there (including a fundraiser for the venue when it was threatened with closure).

The band has contributed to two more of Django Bates' records. His 1995 album Winter Truce (and Homes Blaze) was dominated by Delightful Precipice performances, while his 1998 album Like Life featured a "special" version of the band (mixing some of its British-based personnel with Danish musicians) performing both new material and alternative versions of previously recorded pieces.

== Musicians ==
- Django Bates – piano, keyboards, peck horn, bandleader and composer
- Iain Ballamy – soprano and alto saxophones
- Steve Buckley – soprano and alto saxophones
- Mark Lockheart – tenor saxophone
- Barak Schmool – tenor saxophone
- Julian Arguelles – baritone saxophone
- Sid Gauld – high trumpet
- Chris Batchelor – soloing trumpet
- Eddie Parker – flute, bass flute
- Sarah Homer – clarinet, bass clarinet
- Dave Laurence – French horn
- Roland Bates – trombone
- Richard Henry – bass trombone
- Sarah Waterhouse – tuba
- Steve Watts – acoustic bass
- Michael Mondesir – electric bass guitar
- Stuart Hall – electric guitar, violin, lap steel, banjo
- Martin France – drums
- Thebe Lipere – percussion

== Discography ==
(on Django Bates albums)

- Summer Fruits (and Unrest) (1993) JMT 514 008-2
- Winter Truce (and Homes Blaze) (1995) JMT 514 023-2
- Like Life (1998) Storyville Records

== Other media appearances ==
=== Radio ===
- Django Bates' Delightful Precipice. Included interview with Bates and Delightful Precipice performances of "Tightrope", "Armchair March", "Eden Express", "Fox Across the Road", "Queen of Puddings", "You Can't Have Everything", "The Loneliness of Being Right", "Candles Still Flicker in Romania's Dark", "sad Afrika", "Peculiar Terms of Intimacy", "Discovering Metal", "Open Letter to Dave DeFries" - recorded at Adrian Boult Hall, Birmingham, UK in October 1993 and broadcast by BBC Radio Three on 14 May 1994.
