= Human Chain (band) =

British jazz quartet

- Origin: London, England
- Genres: jazz
- Years active: 1981–present
- Labels: Loose Tubes, JMT, Argo, Screwgun Records, Storyville Records, Lost Marble Records
- Members: Django Bates; Iain Ballamy; Michael Mondesir; Martin France
- Past members: Steve Argüelles; Steve Berry; Steve Buckley; John Eacott; Mark Lockheart; John Parricelli; Eddie Parker; Ashley Slater; Tim Whitehead; Stuart Hall

Human Chain are a British jazz quartet led by composer and keyboard virtuoso Django Bates. The band have been Bates's main musical outlet since 1990 and have performed on most of his albums.

Human Chain have toured in Europe, North America, South America, Japan, China, and India and have also worked in the classical orchestral world for concerts in the UK, Finland, Germany, and Greece (classical music collaborators have included Joanna MacGregor, Britten Sinfonia, London Sinfonietta, and the Duisberger Philharmonic). The band have also sometimes been involved in theatre work.

== History ==
=== Origins ===
In 1981, three years into the start of his career, Bates began creating a band called Humans. He would continue with the band in parallel to his larger scale work with the big band Loose Tubes, and both bands would share personnel.

By 1983, the band name had morphed into Human Chain, a tribute to the number of musicians who had passed through the band. At this point the list of past members was drummer Dave Trigwell, trumpeter John Eacott, saxophonist Mark Lockheart, double bassists Mick Hutton and Steve Berry, flute player Eddie Parker and guitarist John Parricelli). Bates has also commented "I also liked the political implications of the name 'Human Chain': these were the Thatcher years and all kinds of people were forming human chains in order to demonstrate peacefully."

=== Early albums and varying lineups (1986–1990) ===
By 1986, the project consisted of Bates plus drummer Steve Arguelles. It was this lineup which recorded the band's debut album, Human Chain which Bates would later describe as "fifteen folky miniatures."

For 1988's Cashin’ In album, multi-instrumentalist Stuart Hall joined the lineup, expanding the group's instrumentation and sonic potential. Bates remembers that "during performances in this trio formation, Stuart Hall would often make three instrument changes per tune, sometimes playing steel pan and piccolo flute simultaneously whilst unplugging a violin with his foot."

Over the next three years, the lineup continued to alter. Arguelles and Hall both left, saxophonist Steve Buckley arrived and the band also gained a permanent drummer, Martin France . At one point the band featured two bass players, Steve Watts and Tim Harries. Bates admits "Neither of them knew why they were both there. I didn't know either; I was still trying to find a band that could be really powerful without being macho, and could be really experimental without being bollocks."

Following the collapse of Loose Tubes in October 1990, Bates set up Delightful Precipice to handle his large ensemble music and "set about sorting out Human Chain."

=== Stabilising the lineup (1991–1992) ===
With Steve Watts having already departed, Tim Harries left Human Chain in September 1991 to join Steeleye Span. This left the remaining members (Bates, Buckley and France) without a bass player just before the start of a Human Chain tour of South America. Rather than use another of his Loose Tubes colleagues, Bates opted to audition another bass guitarist - Michael Mondesir, brother of Jazz Warriors drummer Mark Mondesir and a collaborator with up-and-coming British pianist Jason Rebello.

Bates recalls: "I drove to Lewisham to hear him playing with (Rebello). It was a really funky band and gave no clues as to what Michael would do to Human Chain's music. By the end of our tour, I knew... and I was very happy! Michael has an infectious fascination with all things rhythmic: he chewed through pieces like "Three Architects Called Gabrielle... Just What I Expected" with an extreme verve and assurance that forced the whole band to perform at a new level of energy." Mondesir has remained Bates's bass player of choice ever since (and also plays with Delightful Precipice).

The Bates-Buckley-Mondesir-France lineup of Human Chain toured Chile, Colombia and Argentina in autumn 1991. They subsequently recorded two pieces ("Three Architects Called Gabrielle" and "Up, Up") for a sampler CD called Pyrotechnics. All of the musicians featuring on this album were promised a deal with Blue Note Records. For Human Chain, this deal never arrived.

By 1992 Buckley had been replaced by Bates's usual saxophone foil, Iain Ballamy, and the long-term quartet was complete. The band played at a number of festivals in Europe including the Belfast International Festival, the Delta International Jazz Festival in the Hague in the Netherlands and the Outside In International Contemporary Music Festival in Crawley, UK.

Despite achieving a stable lineup, the band did not release any further recordings under the Human Chain name. Instead, they became Bates's primary musical vehicle, performing live and releasing all subsequent recorded output under his name.

=== Work as Bates's main band (1991–1998) ===
Throughout the 1990s, Human Chain would be the band Bates most frequently played and toured with.

In 1993, Human Chain were the central performers on Bates's second album Summer Fruits (And Unrest), playing four tracks as themselves and the remaining seven as the core of Delightful Precipice.

Also in 1993, Human Chain became involved in the innovative music-theatre piece 'Out There', conceived and directed by Campbell Graham and written by Simon Black with music by Bates. 'Out There' toured on various dates between 1993 and 1995, performing at The Place, Riverside Studios, Manchester Royal Exchange, Tron Theatre, Glasgow International Jazz Festival. Working with a cast including Jason Flemyng, Human Chain provided the live music for the piece and also took on individual acting roles, most notably Bates playing "God" and Iain Ballamy playing "Steve the Prat".

In 1995, Human Chain were again the main performers on Bates's fourth album Winter Truce (And Homes Blaze), this time playing five tracks as themselves and five within Delightful Precipice.

In 1996, Human Chain performed on Bates's fifth album, the classical/Third Stream-inspired and predominantly orchestral Good Evening... Here Is The News. Human Chain played on four tracks accompanying the London Sinfonietta and also performed one track by themselves (the bizarre "City In Euphoria/World In Chaos")

In 1998, Bates released his sixth album Like Life, which was connected to his winning of the 1997 Jazzpar Award and featured several new pieces plus revisitations of his back catalogue of compositions. Although most of the album was performed by Bates with the Danish Radio Jazz Orchestra, the other three Human Chain members also contributed as part of an altered lineup of Delightful Precipice.

=== Quiet Nights (1998-circa 2000) ===
In 1998, Bates set up a new Anglo-Swedish band called Quiet Nights, which consisted of the four members of Human Chain plus Swedish jazz singer Josefine Cronsholm. This band was to cover an area of jazz which Bates had previously shunned or mocked – songs which had become jazz standards. Bates had anticipated this new project with his infamous 1995 subversion of "New York, New York" (performed by Delightful Precipice and sung by Irish singer Christine Tobin). The Quiet Nights band was to approach the same territory and continue to subvert the original songs, but generally with a much more down-tempo and peaceful approach.

In a 2008 interview with All About Jazz, Bates commented on his conversion to this kind of music as follows:

"Back in the early 1990s I did a couple of records with a Norwegian singer, Sidsel Endresen. Doing them opened my ears to the possibilities of using a singer and words. It was almost like having an actor on stage, telling a story, rather than a singer in the traditional sense. Previously, I'd been put off the idea of jazz and singing together because there was certain style of doing that — very over the top, lots of vibrato —while I prefer something quite different, more natural.

Then a few years later, when I did the Jazzpar, and they asked me to put together a contrasting project, the first thing I saw when I went to gigs in Copenhagen was a student jam session. There was this girl who just sang a standard beautifully and then sat down—and all these males improvised for about an hour, all taking turns to solo kind of competitively, while she sat there quietly, like in a trance. Then when they finished she just got up and sang the song again. Something about that amused me and I was impressed by it.

After that, I got more interested in having the power of the human voice in my music. Because people had always said, "Yeah, I like your stuff, but it's kind of complicated, anybody who isn't a musician isn't going to be able to bear to listen to it." Maybe I'm exaggerating, but I got the impression that what I did was perceived as being quite muso orientated, and I found that a singer opened it out to more people."

Their recordings of these songs made up the seventh Django Bates album, released in 1998 and also called Quiet Nights. It featured reinventions of songs including "Somewhere Over The Rainbow", "Solitude" and "Hi-Li-Ho".

Quiet Nights would continue to tour and perform during the remainder of the 1990s, although Cronsholm left after the first tour to start a family. She was replaced by another Swedish jazz singer, Josefine Lindstrand, about whom Bates has commented "She's a quite different singer to Josefine Cronholm, more lively and right on the beat compared to the very relaxed thing we'd done on Quiet Nights with standards and ballads."

At an unspecified point during this time, Bates claims that Human Chain "ate" Quiet Nights. This appears to mean that the Quiet Nights project was reabsorbed into Human Chain activity with Lindstrand becoming a fifth member of the band, although it's not entirely clear whether she is a full member or a longstanding guest collaborator.

=== Human Chain in the 21st century ===
From around 2000 onwards, Bates’ recorded output and live performances became rarer as he adapted to a shrinking British jazz scene. He began to concentrate more on composition, including large-scale commissions for classical performers and ensembles. However, Human Chain remained Bates's main performance band, and appeared alongside The Smith Quartet at the Venice Biennale in 2003.

Human Chain was once again the core band on Bates's eighth album You Live And Learn (Apparently), which was released on his own label Lost Marble Recordings in 2004. Lindstrand was also a band member on the album which featured additional guest performances by The Smith Quartet, saxophonist David Sanborn and guitarist Jim Mullen. Human Chain played at the Fuse 2004 music festival in Leeds (curated by Bates) to promote the record.

The band's work has diminished from 2005 onwards following Bates's employment as a professor at the Rhythmic Music Conservatory in Copenhagen, Denmark. Ballamy, France, Mondesir and Lindstrand have all concentrated on different projects. However, the band remain formally active and reunited to record Bates's ninth album Spring Is Here (Shall We Dance?), which was released in 2008.

== Current members ==
- Django Bates (keyboards, E♭ tenor horn, occasional vocals)
- Iain Ballamy (saxophones)
- Michael Mondesir (bass guitar)
- Martin France (drums, electric percussion)
- Josefine Lindstrand (vocals)

== Deputising members ==
Although the lineup of Human Chain has remained steady since 1992, various other musicians have occasionally deputised in the absence/pre-booking of regular members. These guest members have included drummer Gary Husband, bass players Laurence Cottle and Stuart Hall, and saxophonists Julian Seigel and Julian Arguelles.

== Discography ==
as Human Chain:

- Human Chain (1986), Ah-Um 002
- Cashin' In (1988), Loose Tubes Records

on Django Bates's albums:

- Summer Fruits (And Unrest), JMT Records JMT 514 008-2 (reissued on Winter and Winter, 2005)
- Winter Truce (And Homes Blaze) JMT Records JMT 514 023-2 (reissued on Winter and Winter, 2005)
- Good Evening... Here is the News Argo 452 099–2
- Quiet Nights, Screwgun Records, SCREWU 70007
- You Live And Learn (Apparently) Lost Marble Recordings LM001
- Spring Is Here (Shall We Dance?) Lost Marble Recordings LM002

Compilation appearances:

- Various Artists, Pyrotechnics, Blue Note 700659

== Other media appearances ==
=== Radio ===
- "Jazz On 3" - Django Bates's Human Chain. BBC RADIO 3 15/07/2005
- "Front Row". Django Bates talks about his first album in 6 years "You Live and Learn (Apparently)". BBC Radio Four 28/06/2004
- "Jazz on 3". Human Chain at London's Vortex Club. BBC RADIO 3 21/9/2001
- "Jazz on 3". Cheltenham Jazz Festival: Django Bates's Human Chain with, Josefine Cronholm, Stian Carstensen, Michael Mondesir, Martin France and Paul Clarvis. BBC RADIO 3 24/4/1999
- "Live from London". Chat show features music from Django Bates's Human Chain - Horses in the Rain. BBC Radio Four 27/03/1999
- "In Tune". ...including Django Bates: Candles Still Flicker. Human Chain, London Sinfonietta / Diego Masson. BBC RADIO 3 1/5/1997
- "Jazz Notes". Django Bates joins the BBC Big Band to perform a selection of his most recent compositions for his own group, Delightful Precipice, including the first UK performance of `Rest and Be Thankful'. With Iain Ballamy (saxophones). RADIO 3 16/5/1996.
- "Jazz at the Bath Festival". Human Chain (Django Bates, Iain Ballamy, Stuart Hall, Martin France with pianist Joanna MacGregor. MacGregor plays solo in pieces by Nancarrow, Cowell, Ligeti and Rzewski. 10/7/1993
- "Outside In Festival". 11/02/1992
