= Ephraim Lewis =

Background information
- Born: 27 November 1967; Wolverhampton, Staffordshire, England
- Died: 18 March 1994 (aged 26) Los Angeles, California, United States
- Genres: Soul, R&B
- Occupation: Singer-songwriter
- Instruments: Vocals, acoustic guitar
- Label: Elektra Records

Ephraim Lewis (27 November 1967 – 18 March 1994) was an English soul and R&B singer and songwriter. He died after falling from a balcony after being tasered during a police pursuit, with only one album to his name, Skin, that spawned a minor hit with "Drowning in Your Eyes" in 1992.

== Career ==
Hailing from Wolverhampton, Ephraim Lewis starting singing gospel when he was young, and cited Joni Mitchell and Curtis Mayfield as influences. He was the youngest of eight children of Jamaican immigrant Jabez Lewis, who fashioned his sons as the Lewis Five with Ephraim as the lead singer.

As an adult in Sheffield, Lewis met Jonathan Quarmby and the two co-wrote most of the music for Lewis's debut album Skin. The album was co-produced by Quarmby and Kevin Bacon, a local studio head, the first major project for a duo who would go on to produce several notable albums in the 1990s. Following a live audition of the song "Summer Lighting", Elektra Records signed Lewis to a worldwide deal in 1991, and the album was released on 29 May 1992.

In 1992, Elektra released "It Can't Be Forever" as the first single from the album, and Lewis made a promotional tour of the U.S. in May, but the single failed to make a splash. Lewis returned to the U.S. for more promotion and performed "It Can't Be Forever" and "Summer Lightning" on Late Night with David Letterman on 16 July 1992.

The second single from Skin, "Drowning in Your Eyes" fared better, making it to number 72 on Billboards's Hot 100 Singles pop chart in October 1992, as well as number 80 on the Hot R&B Singles chart and number 12 on the Hot Adult Contemporary chart. The music video for the song was in heavy rotation on the broadcast channel VH1 and the song was top ten on radio in the Houston area. In Australia, "Drowning in Your Eyes" peaked at number 145 on the ARIA Charts.

Lewis called the music on his album "subtle yet deep with an ethereal quality...but with substance". He credited Quarmby for the jazz aspects of the album and himself for the "soul-gospel element to the music". Describing some of the songs, Lewis explained that the title track to Skin came "out of my teenage years, when I felt particularly vulnerable; 'Mortal Seed' refers to a situation where my girlfriend went through an abortion. It was a difficult period in my life." "Then, 'Rules for Life' and 'It Can't Be Forever' are really songs I wrote out of observation. 'Rules' is about how people let things stop them from their goals and dreams in life, how life isn't always just black and white."

Despite Skin being "a priority project through the end of the year", the album only sold around 150,000 copies and did not chart in the U.S. or UK, though it made it to number 185 in Australia.

In a contemporary review, Spin magazine's Jon Young praised the album a "snazzy" work that "ignores clichés and captures deep, deep feelings with impressive style" and drew favorable comparisons with doo-wop, Stevie Wonder and Prince. "Poised between retro and techno, the young man just lets his emotions fly." A contemporary Billboard review was also generally positive, but noted that, "sadly, [the] complex track may fly over the heads of those on a steady diet of overblown power ballads."

Retrospective reviews have praised Lewis's work, with music writer Michael A. Gonzales calling Skin "brilliant" and "one of the best soul albums of the 1990s". Hope Silverman notes that while is "undeniably 'of its time', featuring very slick early '90s production values (faux strings, muted horns, shimmery backing vocals) and that pseudo electro-cool groove that became so common in the wake of Massive Attack's 'Blue Lines'", it is "full of sinewy, anthemic and memorable songs and the filler is minimal". Silverman describes Lewis's voice as "absolutely beautiful, rising up from the bottom of the sea to the most glorious of falsettos with ridiculous ease".

In 1993, Lewis contributed a duet with Laura Satterfield, "I Know I Don't Walk on Water", to the soundtrack of the film Made in America.

Following the relative lack of success of Skin, Elektra was interested in a more commercial-friendly sound for Lewis and had him part ways with Quambry and Bacon. At the time of his death, Lewis was in Los Angeles working with superstar songwriter and producer Glen Ballard on a second album.

== Death ==
On 18 March 1994, Los Angeles Police Department (LAPD) responded to reports of a "naked black man acting crazy" at 1710 Fuller Avenue, the apartment where Lewis was living. They reported that Lewis had tried to escape the officers, and began climbing the outside balconies. When he reached the top floor there was an altercation. While on the top balcony, the police had used a taser on Lewis three times.

Naomi Hobbs, Lewis's cousin, who is a barrister, said:

Ephraim was murdered by the police. Words fail me as to why they used a stun gun on someone standing on a balcony. They didn't just use it once but three times and as soon as they used that gun Ephraim was bound to fall and bound to die. It was so reckless.

== Discography ==
Skin

Studio album by Ephraim Lewis
- Released: 29 May 1992
- Studios: Axis Studios and Fon Studios (Sheffield, UK); Parkgate Studios (East Sussex, UK)
- Genres: R&B; neo soul
- Length: 46:10
- Label: Elektra
- Producers: Kevin Bacon; Jonathan Quarmby

Professional ratings
Review scores
Source	Rating
Allmusic	2.5/5 stars

=== Skin ===
Skin
No.	Title	Writer(s)	Length
1.	"Skin"	Ephraim Lewis, Jonathan Quarmby	5:19
2.	"It Can't Be Forever"	Kevin Bacon, Lewis, Quarmby	4:56
3.	"Drowning in Your Eyes"	Lewis, Quarmby	5:06
4.	"Mortal Seed"	Lewis, Quarmby	4:35
5.	"World Between Us"	Bacon, Lewis, Quarmby	4:49
6.	"Captured"	Lewis	4:11
7.	"Summer Lightning"	Quarmby	3:55
8.	"Rule for Life"	Lewis, Quarmby	4:20
9.	"Sad Song"	Lewis, Quarmby	4:41
10.	"Hold On"	Lewis, Quarmby	4:20
Total length:			46:10

=== Charts ===
Weekly chart performance for Skin
Chart (1992)	Peak position
Australia (ARIA)	185

=== Personnel ===
Musicians and Vocalists

- Ephraim Lewis – vocals, backing vocals
- Jonathan Quarmby – keyboards, programming
- Hussein Boon – guitars (1, 4)
- Kevin Bacon – bass (3, 5, 8, 10)
- Barry Zeli – bass (7)
- Trevor Murrell – drums (1, 9)
- Eddy Hackett – drums (3)
- Caroline Bowden – drums (4, 10)
- Darren Ford – drums (6)
- Colin Elliot – percussion (1, 3–5, 7, 9, 10)
- Michael Ward – saxophone (1)
- Steve Buckley – saxophones (4, 8, 10)
- Dave Bitelli – saxophones (9)
- Henrik Linnemann – flute (9)
- Ashley Slater – trombone (4, 8, 9), trumpet (10)
- Chris Batchelor – trumpet (3, 4, 8–10)
- Paul Miro – additional backing vocals (4, 10)
- Mark Sheridan – additional backing vocals (4), guitars (8, 10)
- Heather Allen – additional backing vocals (6, 10)

Production

- Mick Cater – executive producer
- Kevin Bacon – producer
- Jonathan Quarmby – producer
- Pete Stewart – assistant engineer
- Robin Hancock – additional mixing (1, 3–6)
- Tony Dawsey – mastering at Masterdisk (New York City, New York, USA)
- Vaughan Oliver – art direction, design
- V23 – art direction
- Nina Schultz – cover photography
- Kevin Westenberg – other photography
- David Harper Management Ltd. – management
