= Music for The Third Policeman =

Soundtrack album by Django Bates
- Released: 1990
- Recorded: January–February 1990
- Genre: Jazz
- Length: 44:32
- Label: Ah Um Records

Django Bates chronology
Cashin' In (1988)	Music for The Third Policeman (1990)	Summer Fruits (and Unrest) (1995)

Professional ratings
Review scores
Source	Rating
Allmusic	2.5/5 stars
The Penguin Guide to Jazz	2/4 stars

Music for The Third Policeman is an album by the composer and musician Django Bates and the Powder Room Collapse Orchestra. It was released by Ah Um records in 1990. The album is based on the 1969 comic novel The Third Policeman, written by the Irish author Flann O'Brien.

It was performed live July 2000.

== Reception ==
Allmusic awarded the album with 2.5 stars.

== Track listing ==
1. "Ouverture" - 2:13
2. "1st Person" - 5:58
3. "John Divney" - 3:52
4. "Peculiar Terms of Physical Intimacy" - 2:28
5. "Getting the Box (Also an Introduction to De Selby)" - 3:53
6. "Martin Finnucane" - 4:11
7. "A Journey is an Hallucination" - 4:54
8. "Is it About a Bicycle?" - 3:24
9. "Mac Cruiskeen" - 3:22
10. "Atoms" - 0:17
11. "Scaffold, Serenity, and One-Legged Army" - 4:34
12. "Soft as the Softest Softness" - 4:12
13. "The Beginning" - 3:48

== Personnel ==
- Django Bates – keyboards, tenor horn, percussion, trumpet on track 7, saw, bicycle pump
- Steve Buckley – tin whistles, alto saxophones, 2nd clarinet on track 2, bicycle bell
- Steve Berry – cello, double bass at the start and at the end of track 3
- Martin France – drums, percussion, scaffold, crossbar
- Stuart Hall – banjo, violin, 12 string guitar, mandolin, backpedalling
- Sarah Harrison – violin, hooter
- Robert Juritz – bassoon
- Dai Pritchard – clarinet, bass clarinet
- Eddie Parker – bass flute on tracks 5 and 11
- Dave Pattman – bongos on track 12
- Ashley Slater – bass trombone on final note of track 3
