= Open Letter (Loose Tubes album) =

Studio album by Loose Tubes
- Released: 1988
- Recorded: December 1987
- Genre: Jazz
- Length: 56:17
- Label: EG Records
- Producer: Teo Macero

Loose Tubes chronology
Delightful Precipice (1987)	Open Letter (1988)	Dancing on Frith Street (1990)

Professional ratings
Review scores
Source	Rating
Allmusic	3/5 stars

Open Letter is the third album by English big band Loose Tubes, that was released on the EG label in 1988.

== Reception ==
Allmusic awarded the album with 3 stars.

== Track listing ==
1. "Sweet Williams" (Django Bates) – 8:54
2. "Children's Game" (Eddie Parker) – 5:27
3. "Blue" (Steve Berry) – 5:52
4. "Shadow Play" (Parker) – 5:40
5. "Mo Mhuirnin Ban" (Trad, arr. Chris Batchelor) – 3:37
6. "Sticklebacks" (Batchelor) – 4:24
7. "Accepting Suites from Strangers" (Bates) – 7:39
8. "The Last Word" (Parker) – 6:39
9. "Open Letter to Dudu Pukwana" (Dave DeFries) – 6:39

== Personnel ==
- Eddie Parker – flute, bass flute
- Dai Pritchard – clarinet, bass clarinet
- Iain Ballamy – alto and soprano saxes and flute
- Steve Buckley – alto and soprano saxes and penny whistle
- Mark Lockheart – tenor and soprano saxes
- Tim Whitehead – tenor sax
- Julian Argüelles – soprano and baritone saxes
- Dave DeFries – trumpet, flugelhorn and percussion
- Chris Batchelor – trumpet
- Lance Kelly – trumpet, flugelhorn
- John Eacott – trumpet, flugelhorn, bugle, clay trumpet
- Richard Pywell – alto trombone, tenor trombone
- John Harborne – tenor trombone, flugelbone
- Steve Day – tenor trombone, euphonium
- Ashley Slater – bass trombone, tuba
- Dave Powell – tuba
- Django Bates – keyboards, tenor horn
- John Parricelli – guitar
- Steve Berry, bass
- Steve Argüelles – drums, percussion
- Thebe Lipere – percussion
