= Loose Tubes (album) =

Studio album by Loose Tubes
- Released: 1985
- Recorded: 29 December 1984 & 15 September 1985
- Genre: Jazz
- Length: 38:44
- Label: Loose Tubes Limited
- Producer: Loose Tubes

Loose Tubes chronology
Loose Tubes (1985)	Delightful Precipice (1987)

Loose Tubes is the debut album by English jazz orchestra Loose Tubes. It was released in 1985 as an LP on Loose Tubes Limited. The recording has never been reissued on CD.

== Track listing ==
1. "Eden Express" (Django Bates) – 8:15
2. "Rowing Boat Delineation Egg" (Bates) – 3:55
3. "Descarga" (Dave Pattman, John Parricelli, Steve Berry) – 8:00
4. "Descarga Ocurriencia" (Berry) – 2:43
5. "Yellow Hill" (Bates) – 6:01
6. "Mister Zee" (Berry) – 7:08
7. "Arriving" (Chris Batchelor) – 4:22

Notes

- Tracks 1, 2, 5, 6 & 7 recorded at Portland Studios, London 29/12/84
- Tracks 3 & 4 recorded at Lansdowne Studios, London 15/9/85

== Personnel ==
- Iain Ballamy – alto & soprano saxophones (soloist: track 5)
- Steve Buckley – alto & soprano saxophones
- Mark Lockheart – tenor saxophone (soloist: track 1)
- Tim Whitehead – tenor saxophone (soloist: track 6)
- Dave Bitelli – baritone saxophone (tracks 1, 2, 5, 6 & 7)
- Howard Turner – baritone saxophone (tracks 3 & 4)
- Dai Pritchard – clarinet & bass clarinet
- Eddie Parker – flute
- David DeFries – trumpet (soloist: track 3)
- John Eacott – trumpet
- Chris Batchelor – trumpet
- Lance Kelly – trumpet (tracks 1, 2, 5, 6 & 7)
- Steve Waterman – trumpet (tracks 3 & 4)
- John Harborne – trombone (soloist: track 3)
- Steve Day – trombone
- Richard Pywell – trombone
- Ashley Slater – bass trombone
- Dave Powell – tuba
- Django Bates – keyboards, melodica (soloist: tracks 1, 6 and 7)
- John Parricelli – electric guitar (soloist: track 4)
- Steve Berry – double bass
- Nic France – drums, electric drums
- Steve Argüelles – percussion
- Colin Lazzerini – bass telephone, typewriter & rabbit
