= Scratches of Spain =

Studio album by Billy Jenkins
- Released: 1987
- Genre: Jazz fusion
- Length: 44:32
- Label: Babel
- Producer: Billy Jenkins

Billy Jenkins chronology
Uncommerciality Vol 1 (1986)	Scratches of Spain (1987)	Wiesen (1987)

Scratches of Spain is an album by the English experimental jazz guitarist and bandleader Billy Jenkins, featuring the Voice of God Collective. It was released on the Babel Records label in 1987.

As with many of Jenkins' records, Scratches of Spain showcases Jenkins' "spaß jazz" approach which combines serious musicianship with conceptual irreverence, musical jokes and détournement. This is reflected in the album title (which refers to the classic Miles Davis album Sketches of Spain, with the cover art also being a parody of the Sketches of Spain artwork), the piece titles (which refer to down-to-earth, mass culture or tourism-related topics rather than the grander romantic conceptions featured on Sketches of Spain) and in the musician credits (which make jokey reference to the stylistic and technical approaches used by each player).

== Track listing ==
All compositions by Billy Jenkins.

1. "Monkey Men" – 6:15
2. "Cuttlefish" – 6:09
3. "Barcelona" – 7:57
4. "Benidorm Motorway Services" – 4:00
5. "Bilbao/St. Columbus Day" – 4:51
6. "Cooking Oil" – 5:12
7. "McDonalds" – 4:41

== Personnel ==
- Billy Jenkins - "spaß" guitar, violin
- Chris Batchelor - "straight" trumpet
- John Eacott - "trad" trumpet
- Skid Solo - "spaß" trumpet
- Iain Ballamy - "bigtime" saxophones
- Steve Buckley - "straight" saxophones
- Dai Pritchard - "spaß" saxophones, clarinets
- David Jago - "grown-up" trombone
- Ashley Slater - "juvenile" bass trombone, tuba, vocals
- Davo Cooke - "heavy metal" guitar
- Django Bates - "doodle" keyboards
- Jimmy Haycraft - "golden" vibraphone
- Jo Westcott - "proper" cello
- Tim Matthewman - "fat" electric bass guitar
- Simon Edwards - "skinny" acoustic bass guitar
- Dawson - "experienced" hand drums, percussion,
- Steve Argüelles - "stuntman" hand drums, "midget" drumkit
- Roy Dodds - excited percussion, "spaßtic" drumkit
