= Nucleus (band) =

British progressive jazz-fusion band

- Origin: United Kingdom
- Genres: Jazz rock; jazz fusion; jazz funk; free jazz; progressive rock
- Years active: 1969–1989; 2005, 2007, 2009 (one-off shows)
- Label: Vertigo

Nucleus was a British jazz rock band, which continued in different forms from 1969 to 1989. In 1970, the band won first prize at the Montreux Jazz Festival, released the album Elastic Rock, and performed both at the Newport Jazz Festival and the Village Gate jazz club.

The band was established by Ian Carr, who had been in the Rendell–Carr Quintet during the middle and late 1960s. Nucleus's debut album, Elastic Rock (1970), and the next two collections, We'll Talk About It Later and Solar Plexus (1971), were all released on Vertigo Records, and music journalist Colin Larkin noted were "vital in any comprehensive rock or jazz collection".

In August 2005, a reincarnation of Nucleus with old and new members performed at Cargo in London. This was followed on 30 March 2007 by a Nucleus Revisited concert at London's PizzaExpress Jazz Club as part of a series of concerts to mark the tenth anniversary of Jazzwise magazine. Nucleus Revisited included Geoff Castle, Mark Wood, and Tim Whitehead and on trumpet, as at the 2005 Cargo concert, Chris Batchelor. Although Ian Carr did not play due to ill health, he was present at the concert and received a standing ovation. On 4 August 2009, Nucleus Revisited appeared at Ronnie Scott's Jazz Club in London with Michael Garrick's Quartet as part of their two-week-long Brit Jazz Fest.

== Members ==
- Ian Carr – trumpet
- Chris Batchelor – trumpet
- Harry Beckett – trumpet
- Kenny Wheeler – trumpet
- Bob Bertles – tenor saxophone, soprano saxophone, flute
- Brian Smith – tenor saxophone, soprano saxophone, flute
- Phil Todd – tenor saxophone, soprano saxophone, flute
- Tim Whitehead – tenor saxophone, soprano saxophone, flute
- Karl Jenkins – baritone saxophone, oboe, piano, electric piano
- Tony Coe – clarinet, bass clarinet, tenor saxophone
- Tony Roberts – clarinet, bass clarinet, tenor saxophone
- Geoff Castle – piano, electric piano, synthesizer
- Ken Shaw - electric guitar
- Gordon Beck – piano, electric piano
- Dave MacRae – piano, electric piano
- John Taylor – organ
- Paddy Kingsland – synthesizer
- Keith Winter – synthesizer
- Allan Holdsworth – guitar
- Jocelyn Pitchen – guitar
- Ray Russell – guitar
- Chris Spedding – guitar
- Mark Wood – guitar
- Roy Babbington – bass guitar
- Rob Burns – bass guitar
- Jeff Clyne – bass guitar
- Mo Foster – bass guitar
- Joe Hubbard – bass guitar
- Billy Kristian – bass guitar
- Dill Katz – bass guitar
- Rob Statham – bass guitar
- Roger Sutton – bass guitar
- Ron Mathewson – bass guitar
- Neil Ardley – drums
- Tony Levin – drums
- Roger Sellers – drums
- Bryan Spring – drums
- John Marshall – drums
- Clive Thacker – drums
- Richard Burgess – percussion
- Chris Fletcher – percussion
- Chris Karan – percussion
- Aureo de Souza – percussion
- Trevor Tomkins – percussion
- Kieran White – vocals
- Norma Winstone – vocals
- Joy Yates – vocals

== Discography ==
- Elastic Rock (Vertigo, 1970) (UK No. 46)
- We'll Talk About It Later (Vertigo, 1970)
- Solar Plexus with Ian Carr (Vertigo, 1971)
- Belladonna (Vertigo 1972, CD CD Linam Records)
- Labyrinth with Ian Carr (Vertigo, 1973)
- Roots (Vertigo, 1973)
- Under the Sun (Vertigo, 1974)
- Snakehips Etcetera (Vertigo, 1975)
- Alleycat (Vertigo, 1975)
- In Flagranti Delicto (Contemp, 1977)
- Out of the Long Dark (Capitol, 1979)
- Awakening (Mood, 1980)
- Jazz London 29/30 with Brian Lemon (BBC, 1983)
- Live at the Theaterhaus (Mood, 1985)
- Live in Bremen (Cuneiform, 2003)
- The Pretty Redhead (Hux, 2003)
- Hemispheres (Hux, 2006)
- UK Tour '76 (Major League 2006)
- Live 1970 with Leon Thomas (Gearbox, 2014)
- Three of a Kind with Ian Carr (Gonzo, 2015)
- Bracknell Sunshine with Ian Carr (Gonzo, 2016)
- Live At The BBC 13-CD box-set (Repertoire, 2021)
