= Sam Leak =

English jazz pianist

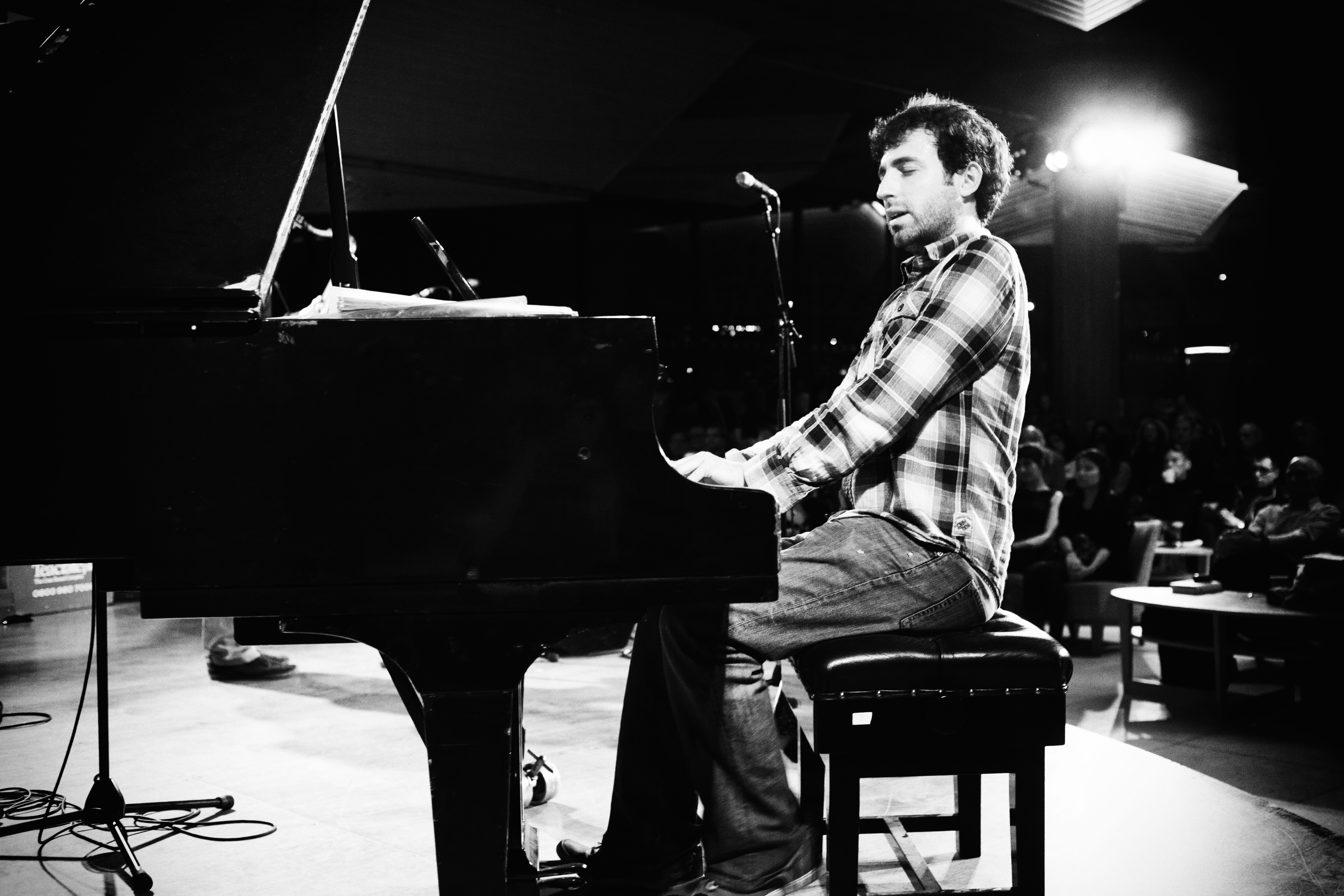
Sam Leak

Sam Leak is an English jazz pianist based in London, known for his albums Places, on Jellymould Jazz, and Aquarium, on the Babel Label.

== Education ==
Leak studied Jazz piano with Gwilym Simcock at the Royal Academy of Music. Leak holds a PhD from the University of Cambridge, where his research examined the learnability of absolute pitch, including experimental work on the "Melody Triggers” method.

== Lecturer in music ==
Leak is a Senior Lecturer in Creative Music Practices (Research) at Middlesex University.

== Critical reception ==
His band 'Aquarium,' with saxophonist James Allsopp, double bassist Calum Gourlay, and drummer Joshua Blackmore, have been described by BBC Music Magazine as playing "assured and sophisticated acoustic jazz with deep roots in the tradition, that knows exactly what it's trying to do, and succeeds." Mojo describe them as: "Multi-faceted and smart as a pin, this is poetic chamber jazz of a very high order."

== Discography ==
As leader:

- Aquarium — Aquarium (Babel Label 2011)
- Places — Aquarium (Jellymould Jazz 2013)
- Adrift — Sam Leak & Dan Tepfer (Jellymould Jazz, 2018).
- Permission — Paula Rae-Gibson & Sam Leak (33 Xtreme, 2018).

As sideman

- In Bad Company - Filipe Monteiro (Filipe Monteiro 2012)
- Road Ahead - Mark Perry and Duncan Eagles Quintet (F-ire Presents 2013)
- Seven Deadly Sings - Louise Gibbs (33 Jazz 2014)
- Ghetto - The SPIKE Orchestra (Spike Records 2014)
- Cerberus: Book of Angels Volume 26 - John Zorn and The SPIKE Orchestra (Tzadik 2015)
- Simians of Swing - Simians of Swing (Coffee and Apple Records 2016)
- Gathering - Chris Rand (Dot Time Records 2016)
- Ask, Seek, Knock - Samuel Eagles and Spirit (Whirlwind Recordings 2017)
