= Partikel =

Partikel may refer to:

- Alfred Partikel (1988–1945), German painter and art professor
- Partikel, contemporary jazz trio founded by English saxophonist Duncan Eagles
- Partikel I - III, three collaborative albums by noise musicians Masami Akita (as Merzbow) and Nordvargr
- Partikel, a novel by Indonesian author Dewi Lestari
