= Virus Called The Blues =

British spoof documentary film

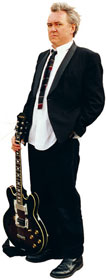
- Billy Jenkins
- Directed by: Craig Duncan
- Written by: Craig Duncan; Billy Jenkins
- Produced by: Craig Duncan
- Cinematography: Craig Duncan; Mat Wayne
- Edited by: Noel Curry
- Music by: Billy Jenkins and The Blues Collective
- Release date: 2001
- Running time: 25 minutes
- Country: United Kingdom
- Language: English

Virus Called The Blues was a 30-minute documentary spoof based on a day in the life of blues and jazz guitarist/songwriter Billy Jenkins and his band The Blues Collective. The documentary was produced, directed by Craig Duncan, who met Billy on the set of the BBC Two music series Jazz 606 in the mid-nineties (filmed at the famous Jazz Venue 606 Club). It features serious interviews and spoof action, plus actual performance from the band at The Blue Elephant Theatre, Camberwell, South-east London. Also visible in the audience is stand-up comedian Stewart Lee, a long-time friend of Jenkins.

== Overview ==
The title of the documentary came from the title of Charles Brown song "Virus Called The Blues", a version of which is available on the 2002 album Blues Zero Two by Billy Jenkins.

The story in the programme follows this pattern: Jenkins convinces his band to do a one off benefit gig to raise money to purchase better lighting in the street surrounding the Theatre. During the run-up to the gig the band lose the location of the venue while out in the group's Reliant Robin. As a result, the audience are left waiting. Bandleader Billy Jenkins argues with the band and bass player Thad Kelly walks out.

In reality, this was a genuine benefit gig and for the most part, a true story and as a result funds were raised and better lighting has since been installed since the documentary was made.

The film was edited by Noel Curry and the Promo was edited by Mike Latham.

== Cast members ==
- Billy Jenkins - electric guitar and voice
- Dylan Bates - electric violin
- Richard Bolton - electric guitar
- Thad Kelly - electric and double bass
- Mike Pickering - drumkit

== See also ==
- The Oxcentrics jazz band
- Voice Of God Collective
