= Tim Whitehead =

Tim Whitehead may refer to:

- Tim Whitehead (ice hockey), American ice hockey coach
- Tim Whitehead (rugby union) (born 1988), South African rugby union player
- Tim Whitehead (musician), British jazz musician
- Timothy Whitehead (born 1997), South African cricketer
