= Elastic Rock =

Studio album by Nucleus
- Released: March 1970
- Recorded: 12–21 January 1970
- Studio: Trident Studios, London
- Genre: Jazz fusion
- Length: 40:46
- Label: Vertigo Records; Universal Records (2007 Remaster)
- Producer: Peter King

Nucleus chronology
Elastic Rock (1970)	We'll Talk About It Later (1971)

Professional ratings
Review scores
Source	Rating
AllMusic	4/5 stars
Encyclopedia of Popular Music	4/5 stars
The Penguin Guide to Jazz Recordings	3/4 stars

Elastic Rock is Nucleus' first album. Recorded in January 1970, it was a pioneering work in the emerging genre of jazz-fusion. Bandleader Ian Carr (later a jazz journalist and published expert on Miles Davis) was probably inspired by Davis' "going electric" in 1969, but the seminal Bitches Brew had not yet been released at the time Elastic Rock was recorded, and according to Carr, they hadn't even heard Davis' less rock-influenced 1969 electric release, In a Silent Way.

In July 1970 the group presented compositions from the LP at the Montreux Jazz Festival, winning the first prize. They subsequently performed both at Newport Jazz Festival and at the Village Gate jazz club.

== Track listing ==
All tracks composed by Karl Jenkins; except where indicated

1. "1916" – 1:11
2. "Elastic Rock" – 4:05
3. "Striation" – 2:15 (Jeff Clyne, Chris Spedding)
4. "Taranaki" – 1:39 (Brian Smith)
5. "Twisted Track" – 5:17 (Chris Spedding)
6. "Crude Blues, Part I" – 0:54 (Karl Jenkins, Ian Carr)
7. "Crude Blues, Part II" – 2:36 (Ian Carr)
8. "1916: The Battle of Boogaloo" – 3:07
9. "Torrid Zone" – 8:41
10. "Stonescape" – 2:39
11. "Earth Mother" – 5:15 (Karl Jenkins, Ian Carr, John Marshall, Jeff Clyne, Chris Spedding)
12. "Speaking for Myself, Personally, in My Own Opinion, I Think..." – 0:54 (John Marshall)
13. "Persephones Jive" – 2:15 (Ian Carr)

== Personnel ==
Nucleus

- Karl Jenkins – oboe, baritone saxophone, electric piano, piano
- Ian Carr – trumpet, flugelhorn
- Brian Smith – tenor saxophone, soprano saxophone, flute
- Chris Spedding – acoustic guitar, electric guitar
- Jeff Clyne – bass, electric bass
- John Marshall – drums, percussion
