= Steve Buckley (musician) =

British jazz musician

Steve Buckley is a British jazz musician. He is a multi-instrumentalist and most often plays alto and soprano saxophones, penny whistle and bass clarinet.

== Career ==
Buckley was a key member of Loose Tubes. He has also been an important side man in many bands including, Human Chain, Ashley Slater's Microgroove and Django Bates' Delightful Precipice. A close connection with African and Latin American musicians led him to play and record with such bands as Bosco D'Olivera's Grupo Folia (UK), The Pan-African Orchestra (Ghana), Kakatsitsi (Ghana) and Massukos (Mozambique). One of his closest musical associations is with trumpet player Chris Batchelor. Together, they released three albums, The Whole and the Half (1995), Life As We Know It (1999) and Big Air (2008), the latter featuring Oren Marshall, Jim Black and Myra Melford. In 2006 they received the BBC Jazz on 3 award for Best New Work with Ten Tall Tales. Buckley's main area of work has always been within the contemporary jazz scene, playing and recording with artists such as John Taylor, Julian Arguelles, Eddie Parker, Steve Noble, Billy Jenkins, Huw Warren, Christine Tobin, Colin Towns, Seb Rochford, Mike Outram, Joseph Jarman, Jonathon Joseph and Leroy Jenkins.

== Discography ==
=== As leader ===
- The Whole and the Half with Chris Batchelor (FMR, 1995)
- Bad Gleichenberg Festival-Edition Vol. 3 with Noble/Marshall (1995)
- Bud Moon with Noble/Marshall (Ping Pong, 1996)
- Life As We Know It with Chris Batchelor (Babel, 1999)
- Big Air with Chris Batchelor (Babel, 2008)

With Loose Tubes

- Loose Tubes (Loose Tubes, 1985)
- Delightful Precipice (Loose Tubes, 1986)
- Open Letter (Editions EG, 1988)
- Dancing On Frith Street (Lost Marble, 2010)
- Sad Afrika (Lost Marble, 2012)
- Arriving (Lost Marble, 2015)

=== As sideman ===
With Django Bates

- Music for the Third Policeman (Ah Um, 1990)
- Summer Fruits (and Unrest) (JMT, 1993)
- Winter Truce (and Homes Blaze) (JMT, 1995)

With others

- Aster Aweke, Kabu (Columbia, 1991)
- Billy Jenkins, Beyond E Major (Allmusic, 1985)
- Billy Jenkins, Scratches of Spain (Thin Sliced, 1987)
- Human Chain, Cashin' in! (Editions EG, 1988)
- Marxman, Time Capsule (More Rockers 1996)
- Jeb Loy Nichols, Just What Time It Is (Trama, 2001)
- Oriole, Song for the Sleeping (F-IRE, 2004)
- Ashley Slater, Ashley Slater's Big Lounge (Plush, 2002)
- Christine Tobin, Yell of the Gazelle (Babel, 1996)
- Huw Warren, A Barrel Organ Far from Home (Babel, 1997)

== Radio performances ==
- Jazz On 3: Big Air. Friday 9 December 2005 23:30-1:00 Radio 3.
