= Cerberus: Book of Angels Volume 26 =

Studio album by The SPIKE Orchestra
- Released: November 20, 2015
- Recorded: July–August 2015
- Studio: Kungar Sound Studios, London
- Genre: Jazz, klezmer, big band
- Length: 56:32
- Label: Tzadik TZ 8338
- Producer: John Zorn

Book of Angels chronology
Gomory: Book of Angels Volume 25 (2015)	Cerberus: Book of Angels Volume 26 (2015)	Flaga: Book of Angels Volume 27 (2016)

Cerberus: Book of Angels Volume 26 is an album by The SPIKE Orchestra, led by Sam Eastmond and Nikki Franklin, which was released in 2015 on John Zorn's Tzadik Records as part of Zorn's "Book of Angels" series. Inspired by big band as well as cartoon music, the album draws from influences such as Duke Ellington, Frank Zappa and Carl Stalling.

== Recording and reception ==
Cerberus was recorded in the summer of 2015 in the Kungar Sound Studios, London.

The album was positively reviewed by Phil Barnes of All About Jazz and Peter Slavid of UK Jazz News. Daniel Spicer of Jazzwise gave it 3 out of 5 stars, describing the album as "just a little too clean-cut and lacking in grit for some tastes".

== Track listing ==
All compositions by John Zorn.

1. "Gehegial" - 4:59
2. "Hakha" - 5:09
3. "Hananiel" - 5:09
4. "Lahal" - 5:19
5. "Armasa" - 7:35
6. "Thronus" - 6:47
7. "Shinial" - 4:42
8. "Donel" - 5:48
9. "Raguel" - 4:45
10. "Pahadron" - 6:19

== Personnel ==
- Paul Booth - tenor sax, clarinet
- Erica Clarke - baritone sax, bass clarinet
- Stewart Curtis - tenor sax, clarinet
- Sam Eastmond - trumpet
- Nikki Franklin - voice
- Moss Freed - guitar
- Ben Greenslade-Stanton - trombone
- Mike Guy - accordion
- George Hogg - trumpet, flugelhorn
- Noel Langley - trumpet, flugelhorn
- Sam Leak - piano, keyboards
- Chris Nickolls - drums
- Dave Powell - tuba
- Ashley Slater - trombone
- Karen Straw - trumpet, flugelhorn
- Mike Wilkins - alto sax, clarinet
- Otto Willberg - bass
- Vasilis Xenopoulos - alto sax, flute
