= Nikki Yeoh =

British jazz pianist (born 1973)

- Born: 24 May 1973 (age 53); London, England
- Genre: Jazz
- Occupations: Pianist; composer; educator
- Instrument: Keyboards

Nikki Yeoh (born 24 May 1973) is a British jazz pianist who has worked with Courtney Pine, Cleveland Watkiss, Steve Williamson, Chante Moore, The Roots and Neneh Cherry. Born in London, Yeoh is of mixed race origin, having a father from Malaysia and a British mother. Some of her first music teachers were Don Rendell and Ian Carr.

Yeoh has a long-standing collaboration with drummer Mark Mondesir and his bassist brother, Michael Mondesir in the jazz trio Infinitum. Yeoh was the musical director for the finalists of the BBC Young Jazz Musician 2020.

In 2022, she was appointed at MEI (Music Education Islington) and Guildhall as the Lead for Jazz, Improvisation and Pop.

== Awards and honors ==
Yeoh won The Independent award for Best Jazz Musician of the Year in 1996 and in 1999 was a semi-finalist at the piano competition at the Montreux Jazz Festival. She won Jazz FM Instrumentalist of the Year in 2017.

== Discography ==
- Piano Language with Joanna MacGregor
- Mutual Serenade with Cleveland Watkiss
- Solo Gemini for solo piano
