= Autumn Fires (and Green Shoots) =

Studio album by Django Bates
- Released: 1994
- Recorded: 15 & 16 February 1994
- Studio: Electric Lady Studios, New York City
- Genre: Jazz
- Length: 64:45
- Label: JMT; JMT 514 014
- Producer: Stefan F. Winter

Django Bates chronology
Summer Fruits (and Unrest) (1993)	Autumn Fires (and Green Shoots) (1994)	Winter Truce (and Homes Blaze) (1995)

Autumn Fires (and Green Shoots) is a solo album by composer and pianist Django Bates which was recorded in 1994 and released on the JMT label.

== Reception ==
Professional ratings
Review scores
Source	Rating
AllMusic	4/5 stars
The Penguin Guide to Jazz	3/4 stars

AllMusic awarded the album 4 stars, stating "English pianist Django Bates has a crazy sense of humor, the ability to use dissonance and noise as a logical part of his music, and a fresh approach to group playing. On this CD, a solo piano outing, he is more subtle than on his group albums and the music takes a little while to cut loose".

== Track listing ==
All compositions by Django Bates except as indicated

1. "Autumn Leaves (Autumn Fires)" (Joseph Kosma, Johnny Mercer, Jacques Prévert) – 6:16
2. "Sweetie" – 5:41
3. "Jetty" – 5:12
4. "Ralf's Trip" – 3:36
5. "Is There Anyone Up There?" – 6:00
6. "Hollyhocks" – 6:07
7. "Solitude" (Duke Ellington, Eddie DeLange, Irving Mills) – 5:25
8. "The Loneliness of Being Right (Part 2)" – 3:39
9. "Rat King" – 1:54
10. "Dufy" – 4:52
11. "Giant Steps" (John Coltrane) – 3:40
12. "Calm Farm (For Paggy)" – 4:35
13. "Infinity in a Twinkling" – 7:41

== Personnel ==
- Django Bates – piano
