= Steve Berry (musician) =

- Born: Stephen John Berry; 24 August 1957 (age 68); Gosport, England, UK
- Genres: Jazz
- Occupations: Musician, composer, educator
- Instruments: Double bass, bass guitar, cello
- Years active: 1980s–present

Steve Berry (born 24 August 1957) is a British jazz double bassist, composer and educator.

== Career ==
Berry developed an interest in jazz during his fine art degree and moved to London in 1979, where he studied with Chris Laurence, Daryl Runswick and Dave Holland. He also undertook postgraduate studies at the Guildhall School of Music and Drama. In 1984, he joined the 21-piece jazz orchestra, Loose Tubes and became one of the main composers on their three studio albums and toured all over the World. In 1988, he formed the Steve Berry Trio with Mark Lockheart on saxophones and Pete Fairclough on drums and released the album Trio on the Loose Tubes record label.

He has performed with many internationally recognised jazz musicians, including Scott Hamilton, John Surman, Tal Farlow, Art Farmer, Ian Carr and Lew Tabackin. In the 1990s he became increasingly active in jazz education and was appointed Head of Jazz and Improvisation at the Royal Northern College of Music in 2019. He also teaches at the Chetham's School of Music.

== Discography ==
- Trio (1988)
- Fortune Heights (2002)
- In An Ideal World (2016)

With Django Bates

- Music for The Third Policeman (1990)

With Loose Tubes

- Loose Tubes (1985)
- Delightful Precipice (1986)
- Open Letter (1988)
- Dancing on Frith Street (recorded live 1990) (2010)
- Säd Afrika (recorded live 1990) (2012)

With Mike Westbrook

- Bar Utopia (1996)
