= Trio (Steve Berry album) =

Studio album by British jazz bassist Steve Berry

Studio album by Steve Berry
- Released: March 30, 1988
- Recorded: March 2–3, 1988
- Genre: Jazz
- Length: 54:41
- Label: Loose Tubes Limited; LTLP 007 LP
- Producer: Mike Walter

Steve Berry chronology
Trio (1988)	Fortune Heights (2002)

Professional ratings
Review scores
Source	Rating
Allmusic	3/5 stars
The Penguin Guide to Jazz	2.5/4 stars

Trio is a studio album by British jazz bassist Steve Berry that was released by Loose Tubes Limited in 1988. It features the Steve Berry Trio with Mark Lockheart on saxophones and Peter Fairclough on drums. The album was originally released on LP, cassette and CD and is now available on the online music platform Bandcamp.

== Reception ==
The Penguin Guide review says: "Berry’s bass-playing is curiously reminiscent of Oscar Pettiford, with the same blend of lyricism and fury and the same cello-influenced higher register effects".

== Track listing ==
All tunes written by Steve Berry, except as noted.

1. "Take Your Time" - 4:18
2. "Bip Bap Dubaddlia" - 5:16
3. "Piraeus" - 4:01
4. "Relic" (Peter Fairclough) - 4:04
5. "After Midnight Hour" - 7:44
6. "Iminwe Tatu" - 3:09
7. "My Father’s Eyes" - 3:00
8. "Evergreen" - 5:45
9. "Open Spaces" - 6:05
10. "Cha Cha Con Meatus" - 4:17
11. "Splaarg" - 6:32

== Personnel ==
- Steve Berry – bass
- Mark Lockheart – tenor and soprano saxophones
- Peter Fairclough – drums
