= Winter Truce (and Homes Blaze) =

Studio album by Django Bates
- Released: 1995
- Recorded: 1–9 February 1995
- Genre: Jazz
- Length: 66:40
- Label: JMT; JMT 514 023
- Producer: Stefan F. Winter

Django Bates chronology
Autumn Fires (and Green Shoots) (1994)	Winter Truce (and Homes Blaze) (1995)	Good Evening... Here is the News (1996)

Winter Truce (and Homes Blaze) is an album led by composer, multi-instrumentalist and band leader Django Bates which was recorded in 1995 and released on the JMT label.

== Reception ==
Professional ratings
Review scores
Source	Rating
AllMusic	3/5 stars
All About Jazz	4/5 stars
The Penguin Guide to Jazz Recordings	3.5/4 stars

AllMusic awarded the album 3 stars. On AllAboutJazz Chris May stated "The unfettered idiosyncrasy of the album—overflowing with new ideas and previously uncharted vistas—sums up much, and the parts themselves continue to make for enthralling listening".

== Track listing ==
All compositions by Django Bates

1. "You Can't Have Everything" – 7:46
2. "The Loneliness of Being Right" – 7:00
3. "...and a Golden Pear" – 8:11
4. "New York, New York" (Fred Ebb, John Kander) – 4:56
5. "Early Bloomer" – 2:13
6. "X = Thingys X 3 ÷ MF" – 4:33
7. "Fox Across the Road" – 12:01
8. "Powder Room Collapse" – 6:10
9. "Kookaburra Laughed" – 6:32
10. "You Can't Have Everything (Reprise)" – 7:11

== Personnel ==
- Django Bates – piano, keyboards
- Eddie Parker – flute, bass flute
- Iain Ballamy – soprano saxophone, alto saxophone, tenor saxophone
- Steve Buckley – soprano saxophone, alto saxophone, tin whistle
- Mark Lockheart – tenor saxophone, clarinet
- Barak Schmool – tenor saxophone, piccolo
- Julian Argüelles – soprano saxophone, baritone saxophone
- Sid Gauld, Chris Batchelor – trumpet
- David Laurence – French horn
- Roland Bates – trombone
- Richard Henry – bass trombone
- Sarah Waterhouse – tuba
- Mike Mondesir – electric bass
- Stuart Hall – guitar, violin, banjo
- Martin France – drums, percussion
- Christine Tobin – vocals
