= Tim Whitehead (musician) =

British saxophonist (born 1950)

- Born: 12 December 1950 (age 75); Liverpool, England
- Genres: Jazz
- Occupations: Musician, composer
- Instrument: Saxophone
- Years active: 1970s–present
- Website: www.timwhitehead.co.uk

Tim Whitehead (born 12 December 1950) is a British jazz musician who plays soprano, alto and tenor saxophone and flute.

== Career ==
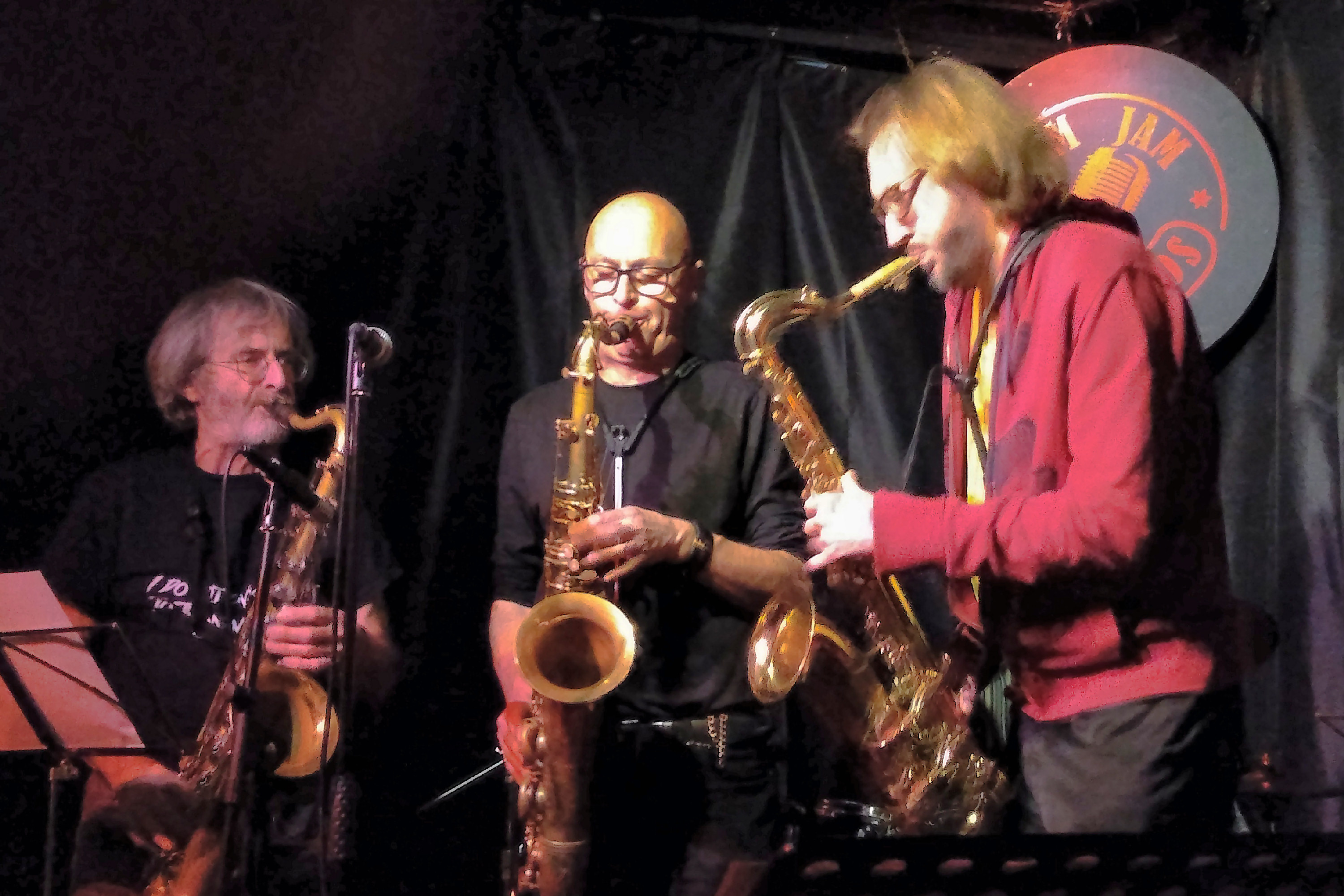
Tim Whitehead (left)

Whitehead played in a folk group during his school days. He then studied law at Manchester University, but gave up his work as a lawyer in 1976 to concentrate on music. Together with guitarist Glenn Cartledge, he led the quartet "South of the Border", which won the Young Jazz Musicians of the Year Award. In 1977 he toured Germany with Ian Carr's "Nucleus"; the following year he toured with Graham Collier. In 1980 he founded his quartet, Borderline, and led his own bands afterwards. Since 1984 he also belonged to the Loose Tubes, with whom he recorded the first three albums. In the 1990s, he played regularly with his band at Ronnie Scott's Jazz Club, but also ran his own clubs and gave lessons. In 1995 The Times wrote that "Tim Whitehead's music is marked by a sense of grace and economy" with a "growing reputation as one of Britain's most thoughtful composers and improvisers." His album Personal Standards (1999), in which he dealt with classics of soul and pop music, was awarded Jazz Album of the Year in the BBC Music Magazine and led to a music education project at Trinity College of Music.

Together with Colin Riley, he was awarded the Peter Whittingham Award in 2000 for his compositions. In 2009 he was Artist in Residence at Tate Britain, (funded by an award from The Leverhulme Trust), which led to him producing the album "Colour Beginnings", with music transcribed from improvisations in front of and inspired by J. M. W. Turner's watercolour sketches.

He was commissioned by the London Jazz Festival to compose "Turner And The Thames" for the 2013 and 2014 festivals. Together with Eddie Harvey he founded the Way Out West collective of musicians in 2004.

He is father of the singer Hattie Whitehead, the actor Fionn Whitehead, and the performer Maisie Whitehead.

== Discography ==
- English People: The Subterranean Life At Richmond Lock And Other Locations (1982). Tim Whitehead's Borderline
- Decision (1988). The Tim Whitehead Band
- Authentic (1991). Tim Whitehead (with Pete Jacobsen, Arnie Somogyi and Dave Barry). Ronnie Scott's Jazz House
- Silence Between Waves (1994). Tim Whitehead (with Pete Jacobsen, Arnie Somogyi and Dave Barry)
- Personal Standards (1999). Tim Whitehead. Home Made HMR047
- Lucky Boys (2002). Tim Whitehead & Giovanni Mirabassi Quartet
- Tides (2003). Colin Riley, Tim Whitehead. The HomeMade Orchestra. Homemade WHMR0048
- Inside Covers (2004). The HomeMade Orchestra (Colin Riley, Tim Whitehead and guests). Homemade HMR049
- Too Young to Go Steady (2007). Tim Whitehead (with Liam Noble, Milo Fell and Oli Hayhurst)
- Colour Beginnings (2010). Tim Whitehead. HomeMade HMR 052
- Seventh Daze (2012). Kwartet (Tim Whitehead, Tony Woods, Milo Fell, Patrick Bettison). Home Made Records HMR 053

With Loose Tubes

- Loose Tubes (1985)
- Delightful Precipice (1986)
- Open Letter (1988)
