= Summer Fruits (and Unrest) =

Studio album by Django Bates
- Released: 1993
- Recorded: 9–13 June 1993
- Genre: Jazz
- Length: 57:14
- Label: JMT; JMT 514 008
- Producer: Stefan F. Winter

Django Bates chronology
Music for The Third Policeman (1990)	Summer Fruits (and Unrest) (1993)	Autumn Fires (and Green Shoots) (1994)

Summer Fruits (and Unrest) is an album led by composer, multi-instrumentalist and band leader Django Bates which was recorded in 1993 and released on the JMT label.

== Reception ==
Professional ratings
Review scores
Source	Rating
AllMusic	3.5/5 stars
The Penguin Guide to Jazz Recordings	3/4 stars

AllMusic awarded the album 3½ stars stating "hot full of breezy humor -- while also falling prey to the needless clutter so popular in fusion bands and jazz schools -- Summer Fruits will no doubt please fans who like their swing embedded in left field, yet logical dress".

== Track listing ==
All compositions by Django Bates

1. "Tight Rope" – 1:17
2. "Armchair March" – 7:01
3. "Food for Plankton (In Detail)" – 5:03
4. "Säd Afrika" – 6:08
5. "Three Architects Called Gabrielle: Just What I Expected" – 6:14
6. "Queen of Puddings" – 8:19
7. "Hyphen" – 5:32
8. "Nights at the Circus" – 4:19
9. "Discovering Metal" – 3:50
10. "Little Petherick" – 6:30
11. "March Hare Dance" – 3:02

== Personnel ==
- Django Bates – piano, keyboards, peck horn
- Eddie Parker – flute, bass flute
- Sarah Homer – clarinet, bass clarinet
- Iain Ballamy, Steve Buckley – soprano saxophone, alto saxophone
- Mark Lockheart, Barak Schmool – tenor saxophone
- Julian Argüelles – baritone saxophone
- Sid Gauld – high trumpet
- Chris Batchelor – soloing trumpet
- David Laurence – French horn
- Roland Bates – trombone
- Richard Henry – bass trombone
- Sarah Waterhouse – tuba
- Steve Watts – acoustic bass
- Mike Mondesir – electric bass
- Stuart Hall – electric guitar, violin, lap steel, banjo
- Martin France – drums
- Thebe Lipare – percussion
