= Chris Batchelor =

British jazz trumpeter and composer

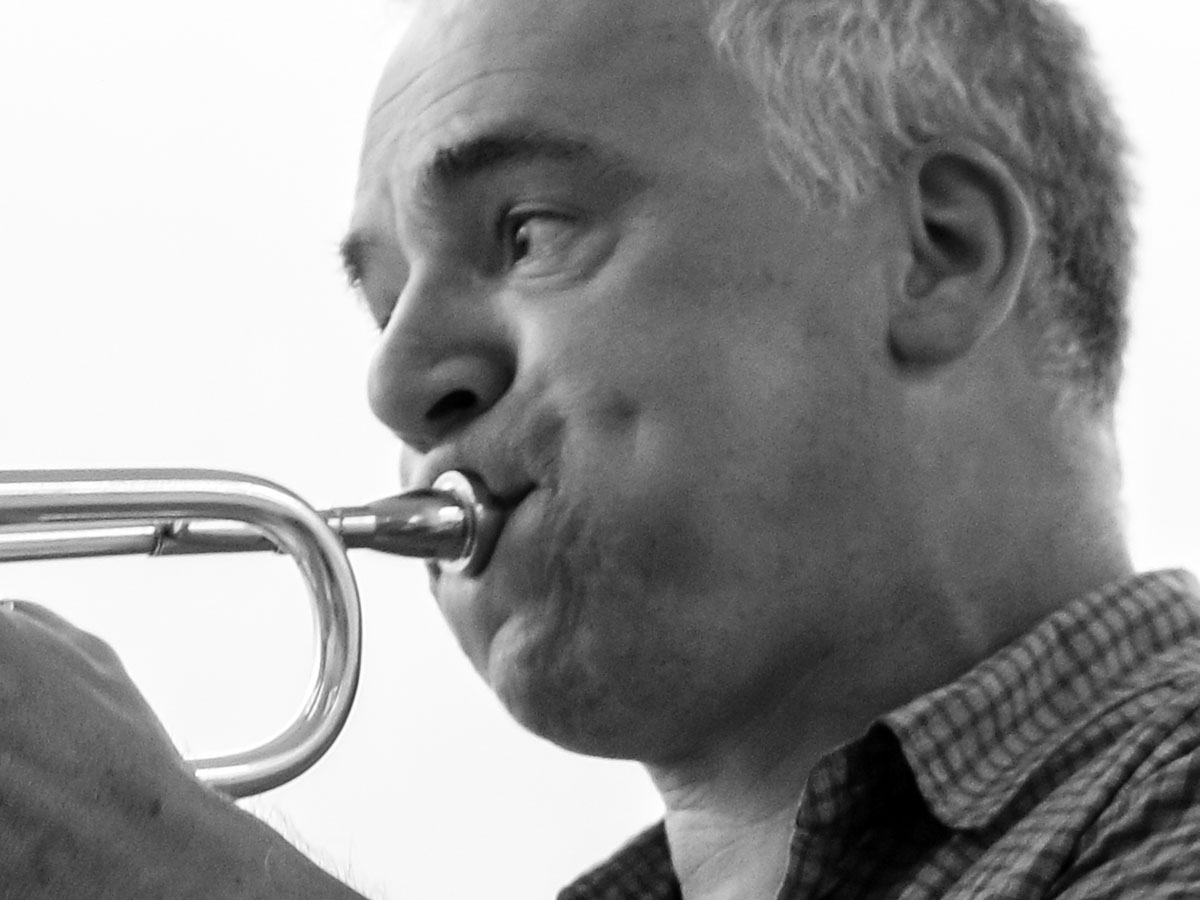
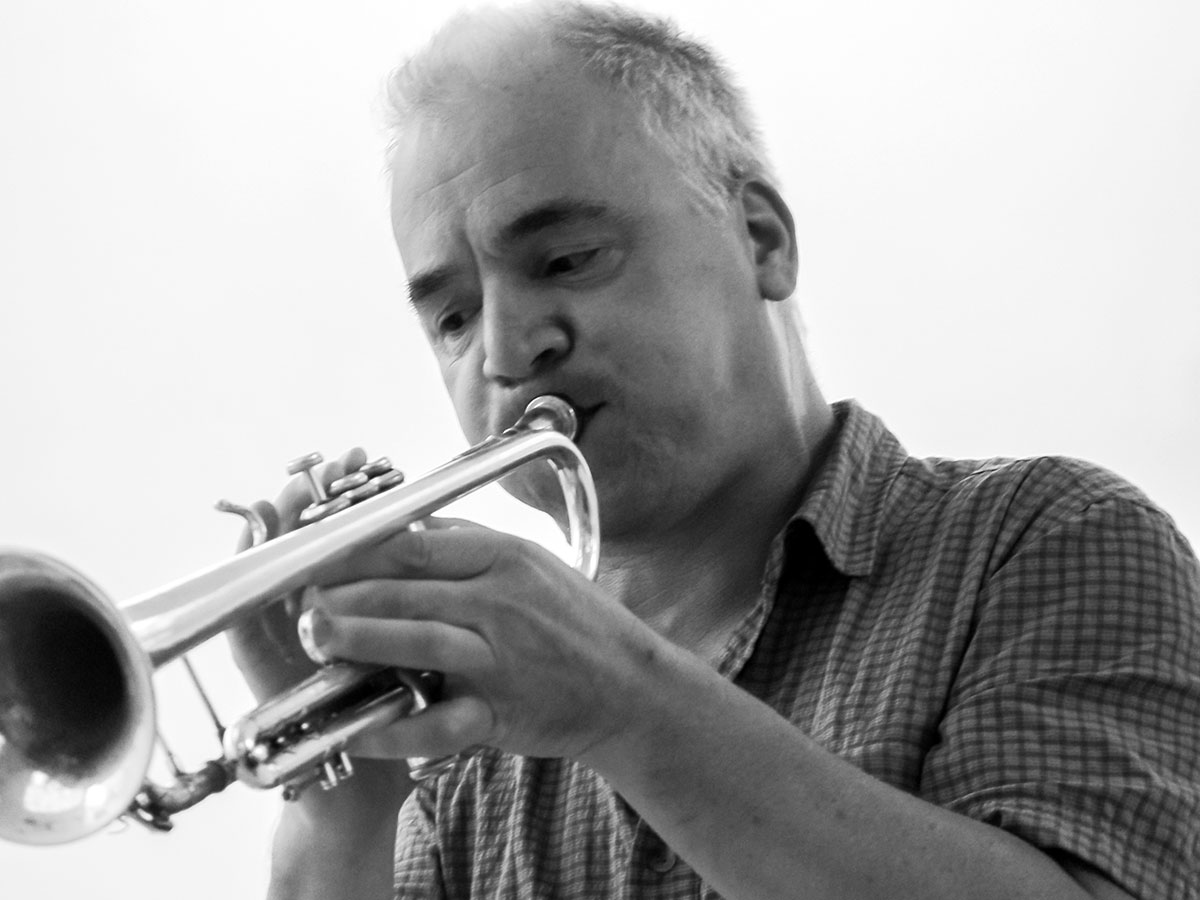
Aarhus Jazz Festival, Denmark (2013)

Chris Batchelor is a British jazz trumpeter and composer. He gained his first professional experience with Dudu Pukwana's Zila aged 17, at the suggestion of Harry Beckett. He subsequently became a founder member, composer and soloist with Loose Tubes, contributing many pieces to the repertoire of the band from 1984 to 1990. He was also very active at this time as a member of world music trailblazers 3 Mustaphas 3, as well as enjoying a varied diet of gigs with Chris McGregor's Brotherhood of Breath, Congolese soukous band Taxi Pata Pata and Ashley Slater's Microgroove.

As a sideman, Chris has appeared alongside many international stars, such as Michael Brecker, Sam Rivers, Hermeto Pascoal, John Taylor and the Jazz Passengers with Deborah Harry. He has enjoyed a long-term playing partnership with altoist Steve Buckley in their bands Orchestra Rafiki, Buckley /Batchelor Quartet and most recently with their award-winning international collaboration Big Air, featuring New York based Myra Melford and Jim Black.

The music that Buckley and Batchelor wrote for the Jazz on 3 commission that brought Big Air together subsequently won them a BBC Jazz Award for Best New Work in 2001. Their 2009 release entitled Big Air was described by Brian Morton in Jazz Journal as "the best British jazz record for 20 years". In November 2009, Batchelor was selected to receive the prestigious Paul Hamlyn Foundation Award for Composers.

== Discography ==
=== As leader ===
- 1994: Whole & The Half – with Steve Buckley
- 1999: "Life As We Know it" with Steve Buckley
- 2009: "Big Air"
- 2019: "Pigfoot Shuffle"

=== As sideman ===
With Django Bates

- Summer Fruits (and Unrest) (JMT, 1993)
- Winter Truce (and Homes Blaze) (JMT, 1995)

With Loose Tubes

- Loose Tubes (1985)
- Delightful Precipice (1986)
- Open Letter (1988)

With Billy Jenkins

- Scratches of Spain (1987)
