= Loose Tubes =

British jazz big band/orchestra

Background information
- Origin: London, England
- Genre: Jazz
- Years active: 1984–1990
- Labels: Loose Tubes, Editions EG

Loose Tubes were a British jazz big band/orchestra active during the mid-to-late 1980s. Critically and popularly acclaimed, the band was considered to be the focal point of a 1980s renaissance in British jazz. It was the main launchpad for the careers of many future leading British jazz players including Django Bates, Iain Ballamy, Eddie Parker, Julian and Steve Argüelles, Mark Lockheart, Steve Berry, Tim Whitehead, Ashley Slater. In 2015, the band reformed to celebrate the 30th anniversary of the band's formation, with concerts at the Cheltenham Jazz Festival, Brecon Jazz Festival and a sold out week at Ronnie Scott's.

The band's orchestration incorporates humor and draws on various genres, including minimalism, ECM-inspired balladry, funk, blues, Latin, and swing. They released their self-titled debut album in 1985, followed by Loose Tubes Too in 1986, distributed by the Import Music Service division of Polygram.

== History ==
=== Origins ===
The band originated from a jazz workshop put together by the British jazz composer and educator Graham Collier in 1983. During the first few weeks of the workshop, keyboard player Django Bates and bass player Steve Berry began to introduce original music to the ensemble. Under the supervision of workshop administrator-turned-manager Colin Lazzerini, the ensemble chose the name Loose Tubes and played its first London gig in 1984.

The band was notable for its size (averaging 21 players) and was run as a co-operative without a single clear leader. While Bates, Berry and trumpeter Chris Batchelor were responsible for a great deal of the music, there were also composing contributions from flute player Eddie Parker, trumpeters Dave DeFries and John Eacott, as well as trombonist John Harborne. During live concerts, trombonist Ashley Slater (later to become frontman of the pop group Freak Power) acted as the band's compère and became renowned for his sarcastic wit.

=== Style, impact and rise ===
Loose Tubes' music was drawn from elements of the whole history of jazz as well as many other musical styles such as samba and hi-life. During its existence, the band was garlanded with critical praise. Time Out referred to them as "the most important band to appear on the British jazz scene" and hailed them as "the best instrumentalists of their generation." The Guardian called them "the most impressive young orchestra to have emerged in London", while The Times claimed "it's hard to imagine anyone else anywhere producing anything as exciting as this in 1985." Loose Tubes were voted the Best UK Band in 1989 by the readers of The Wire magazine.

The band were iconoclastic, with a strong sense of fun, and made a sense of humour an important component of their music. This occasionally led to criticism.

=== Success ===
In 1987, Loose Tubes became the first jazz orchestra to play at the Proms, the BBC's annual classical music festival held at the Royal Albert Hall. They also collaborated with the Docklands Sinfonietta. Other high points included a UK tour for the Contemporary Music Network and a residency at Ronnie Scotts, at the end of which they marched out into the streets of Soho at 3 a.m. still playing, with the audience following.

Loose Tubes released three albums between 1985 and 1989 – Loose Tubes, Delightful Precipice and Open Letter. The second was ranked No 100 in the 2022 Jazzwise poll 100 Jazz Albums that Shook the World, where Andy Robson commented that the album "revealed not only a respect for tradition but also wove threads of worlds with other musics". Open Letter was produced by Teo Macero who commented "These guys are interested in real composition, real melodies, not just being super hip. I haven't seen a young band in the US that wants to do things like that." A live album, Loose Tubes: JazzbucheBerlin 87 was also released.

In addition, the band set up their own Loose Tubes record label. The label released albums by the Human Chain duo (Bates and Steve Argüelles), The Iains (a quartet led by Iain Ballamy), a quintet led by Tim Whitehead, a trio led by Steve Berry and a duo with Stan Sulzmann and John Taylor playing the music of Kenny Wheeler.

=== Disbandment ===
Loose Tubes disbanded in 1990, largely due to the difficulty in financially sustaining and organising such a large ensemble of musicians (a situation not helped by the contemporary economic crisis in the UK). The collective leadership of the band had also become unmanageable and it was time for many of the musicians to move onto more focussed individual careers. Saxophonist Iain Ballamy later reflected "It kind of reached the stage where the band had to change a lot — and nobody could change it — or it had to end so something new could come along. And that’s what happened."

In 2010, twenty years after the band had disbanded, Django Bates announced that he would be releasing a Loose Tubes live album called Dancing on Frith Street on his own label Lost Marble Recordings. The recordings were made at Ronnie Scotts during the band's last week of live activity in 1990. Dancing on Frith Street was released in September 2010.

=== Reunion ===
In 2014, to celebrate their 30th anniversary Loose Tubes reformed for a series of concerts. A unanimous declaration the band laid down for this 30th Anniversary reunion was that, to be relevant in 2014, there had to be new music; they "definitely didn't want to be their own tribute band". To this end, BBC Radio 3 in association with Jazz on Three commissioned new works from Chris Batchelor, Django Bates. Steve Berry and Eddie Parker. These were premiered at Cheltenham International Jazz festival on Saturday 3 May 2014, alongside Loose Tubes' classic repertoire from the 1980s, including Yellow Hill, Shelley, The Last Word, Sticklebacks and Sunny. The band followed this with a sell-out headlining week at Ronnie Scotts Club the band's spiritual home. They also played Brecon international Jazz festival on 8 August 2014 and Gateshead International Jazz Festival on 12 April 2015. On 10 June 2015, Loose Tubes won the Jazz FM Award for Best Live Experience for last year's reunion concert at Cheltenham Jazz Festival, beating two other worthy nominees, The Blue Note 75th Birthday at EFG London Jazz Festival and Jamie Cullum at the Love Supreme Jazz Festival. The winner of this category was chosen by public vote.

== 2014 line up ==
Flutes: Eddie Parker, Clarinets: Dai Pritchard Alto Soprano saxophones: Steve Buckley & Iain Ballamy Tenor Saxophone: Mark Lockheart & Julian Nicholas Baritone: Julian Argüelles, Trumpets: Lance Kelly, Noel Langley, Chris Batchelor & John Eacott Trombones: Paul Taylor, John Harborne, Ashley Slater & Richard Pywell, Bass Trombone: Richard Henry, Tuba: Dave Powell, Keyboards:Django Bates, Guitar: John Parricelli, Bass: Steve Watts, Drums: Martin France, Percussion: Louise Petersen Matjeka

== Legacy ==
The legacy of Loose Tubes continues strongly both through its former members, who continue to be leading lights of the UK music scene, and also its inspirational effect on younger musicians. F-IRE Collective founder Barak Schmool, who worked as a roadie for Loose Tubes, cites Loose Tubes as a formative influence.

In 1991, Django Bates formed his large ensemble Delightful Precipice which includes many musicians from Loose Tubes and is in certain respects a continuation of their work (albeit one with a single leader).

== Band members ==
- Julian Argüelles, soprano and baritone saxes
- Steve Argüelles, percussion on the first and second albums, then drums and percussion
- Iain Ballamy, soprano and alto saxes
- Chris Batchelor, trumpet
- Django Bates, keyboards
- Steve Berry, bass
- Steve Buckley, soprano and alto saxes
- Steve Day, trombone and euphonium
- Dave DeFries, trumpet
- John Eacott, trumpet
- Paul Edmonds, trumpet
- Ted Emmett, trumpet
- Nic France (played drums on the first and second albums)
- Martin France drums
- John Harborne, trombone

Sarah Homer, bass clarinet

- Lance Kelly, trumpet
- Noel Langley, trumpet
- Thebe Lipere, percussion
- Mark Lockheart, tenor and soprano saxes
- Julian Nicholas, tenor and soprano saxes
- John Parricelli, guitar
- Eddie Parker, flutes, keyboards
- Simon Gill, tuba/brass
- Dave Powell, tuba
- Dai Pritchard, clarinets
- Richard Pywell, trombones
- Ashley Slater, trombone
- Ken Stubbs, baritone, alto saxes
- Paul Taylor, trombone
- Steve Watts, bass

Sarah Waterhouse, tuba

- Tim Whitehead, tenor sax

== Discography ==
- Loose Tubes (1985)
- Delightful Precipice (1986)
- Open Letter (1988)
- Loose Tubes: Jazzbühne Berlin 87
- Dancing on Frith Street (Lost Marble LM005, 2010) – live album recorded at Ronnie Scott's Sept 1990]
- Säd Afrika (Lost Marble LM006, release date 14 May 2012) – live album recorded at Ronnie Scott's Sept 1990]
- Arriving (Lost Marble LM008, release date 2015) – live album recorded at Ronnie Scott's Sept 1990 and at the BBC in 2014]

== Other media appearances ==
=== Film and television ===
- Loose Tubes at Bath International Festival, May 1986, and in Green Park Station. BBC TWO 3 January 1987
- Celebration: Loose Tubes documentary. The 21-piece jazz orchestra had its first national tour. The musicians are shown conducting a jazz 'workshop' in Sheffield, as well as performing. Directed by Christopher Swann. Produced by Granada Television. Channel Four, January 1987.
- Wogan, BBC ONE, 7 September 1987. The band performed "Sticklebacks" from their 1988 album Open Letter.

=== Radio ===
- "Loose Tubes @ Pendley Manor Festival 1985". 55m total: Chip, Delightful Precipice, Would I Were, Rowingboat Delineation Egg, Full Moon, Stanley Shuffle. BBC Radio 3 "Magnum Opus" broadcast from March, 1986.
- "Magnum Opus". Loose Tubes perform at the Logan Hall, London. Sad Africa – 6'35" BATES, Sunny – 5'34" EACOTT, Delightful Precipice – 7'50" BATES, Blue – 7'17" BERRY We Are, Are You? 5'01" HARBORNE, Eden Express – 8'52" BATES, Mo mhuirnin ban – 4'12" TRAD arr. BATCHELOR, Sosbun Brakk 5'43" PARKER Hermeto's Giant Breakfast – 12'24" DEFRIES, Psycopath-a-go-go – 4'48" BERRY, Accepting suites from strangers – 8'25" BATES, Arriving – 4'40" BATCHELOR, Mister Zee – 7'44" BERRY. BBC Radio 3, 1 May 1987
- "The Proms 1987: Loose Tubes" (1) BERRY, Steve "Mister Zee" (2) Eddie PARKER "Sosbun Brakk" (3) CREWE/GAUDIO "Can't take my eyes off you" (4) BATES, Django: "Sweet Williams" (5) BERRY, Steve: "Blue" (6) BATES, Django: "Accepting suites from strangers" (7) Chris BATCHELOR "Sticklebacks" (8) Dave DEFRIES "Open letter to Dudu Pukwana" (9) Chris BATCHELOR "Arriving" (10) BATES, Django: "Yellow hill". BBC Radio 3, 30 August 1987

== See also ==
- British jazz
