= Brian Smith (New Zealand musician) =

New England jazz saxophonist and flautist

Brian Smith (born 3 January 1939 in Wellington) is a retired New Zealand jazz saxophonist and flautist.

== Life and career ==
Smith studied piano in his youth but was primarily an autodidact on reeds. He played locally in pop and jazz groups before moving to England in 1964, where he played with Alexis Korner's Blues Incorporated. Following this he played at Ronnie Scott's Jazz Club in 1966-67 and in the big bands of Tubby Hayes (1969) and Maynard Ferguson (1969–74). He worked with the group Nucleus from 1969 to 1982, and also with Mike Westbrook (1969), Neil Ardley (1969, 1976), Mike Gibbs (1970), the Spontaneous Music Ensemble (1970–71), and Keith Tippett (1971). He also worked with Pacific Eardrum in 1975-76 and Paz in 1976.

In 1982, Smith returned to New Zealand, where he began playing with his own quartet. His 1984 album Southern Excursions was named Australian Jazz Record of the Year. He worked with Frank Gibson, Jr. later in the 1980s and was based out of Auckland. His Moonlight Sax albums were chart successes in New Zealand.

== Discography ==
- Southern Excursions (Ode Records (New Zealand), 1984)
- Moonlight Sax (Ode, 1990)
- Moonlight Sax 2 (Ode, 1991)
