= Josefine Lindstrand =

Swedish singer

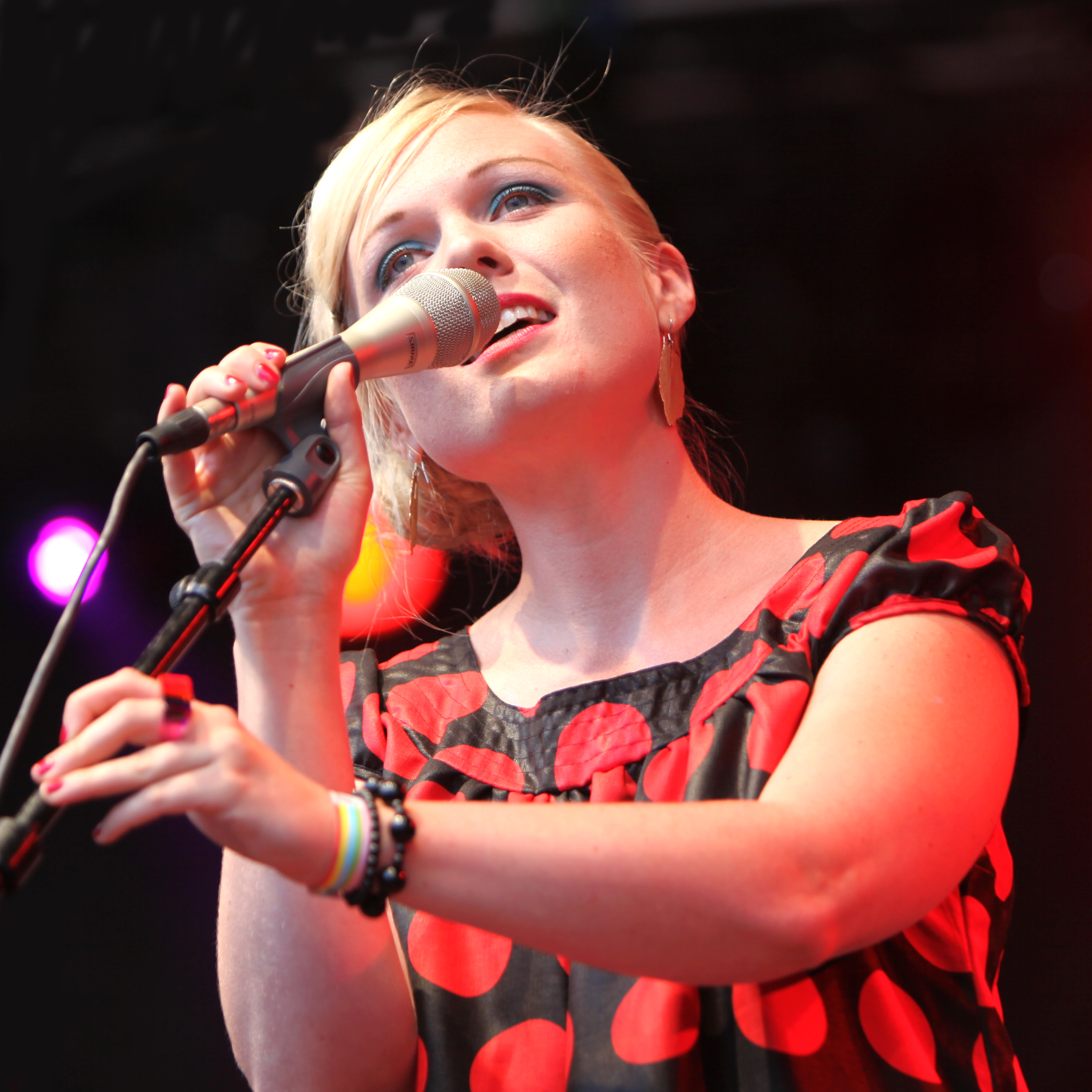
Josefine Lindstrand (2009)

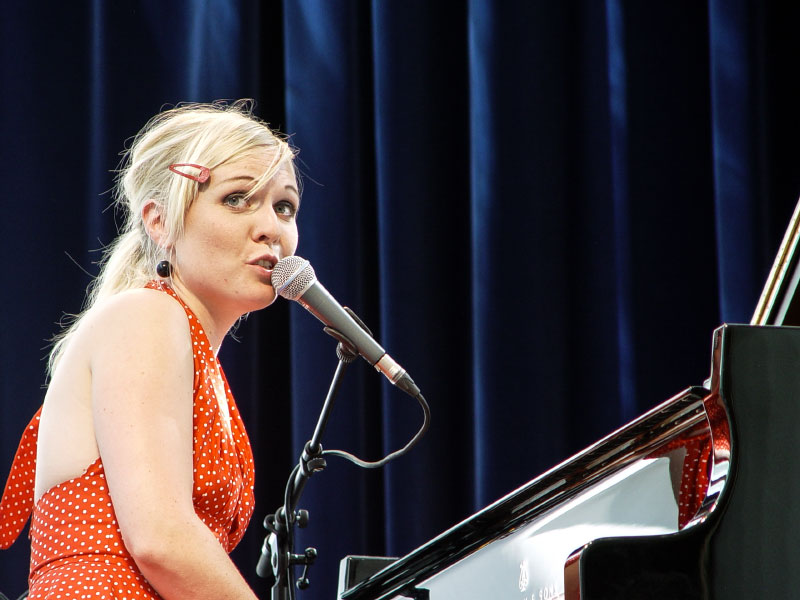
Josefine Lindstrand at Aarhus Jazz Festival (Denmark 2009)

Josefine Lindstrand is a Swedish singer. She received the Jazz in Sweden award for 2009 from the government agency Rikskonserter, and her debut record There Will Be Stars was released soon afterwards. The album received a favourable review in Svenska Dagbladet. In 2012 her second album Clouds was released. Lindenstrand used her middle name Britah for this record, which a reviewer in Dagens Nyheter characterised as pop rather than jazz.

Lindstrand has also performed with artists such as Efterklang, Django Bates, Uri Caine, Petra Marklund, Veronica Maggio, Maia Hirasawa, Laleh, and Jonathan Johansson. She resides in Stockholm, Sweden.

== Awards ==
- 2004 – The Ted Gärdestad scholarship
- 2009 – Rikskonserter's Jazz i Sverige ("Jazz in Sweden")

== Discography ==
- Britah; Clouds, Antfarm Records
- Josefine Lindstrand; There Will Be Stars, Caprice Records
