= Arriving (Loose Tubes album) =

Live album by Loose Tubes
- Released: 2015
- Recorded: September 1990
- Venue: Ronnie Scott's Jazz Club, London
- Genre: Jazz
- Label: Loose Tubes
- Producer: Loose Tubes

Loose Tubes chronology
Säd Afrika (2012)	Arriving (2015)

Professional ratings
Review scores
Source	Rating
Jazzwise	4/5 stars

Arriving is a 2015 live album by the English jazz ensemble Loose Tubes recorded at Ronnie Scott's in September 1990 and at the BBC in 2014.

== Reception ==
Selwyn Harris of Jazzwise stated, "Although they seem to mark the end of the reconciliation, the title Arriving suggests otherwise; Loose Tubes could, let’s hope, be around for a while yet. With eight further gems from the original Tubes repertoire, the band’s musical palette is as idiomatically broad as its musicians were diverse. It’s clear however from listening to Arriving that it never compromised the magical collective spirit and vision that the ensemble had when it took to the stage."

== Track listing ==
1. "Armchair March"
2. "Children's Game"
3. "The Wolf's Dream and the Wild Eye"
4. "A"
5. "Nights at the Circus"
6. "Eden Express"
7. "Arriving"
8. "Fast Forward"
9. "As I Was Saying..."
10. "Bright Smoke, Cold Fire"
11. "Creeper"
