= Michael Mondesir =

English guitarist and composer (born 1966)

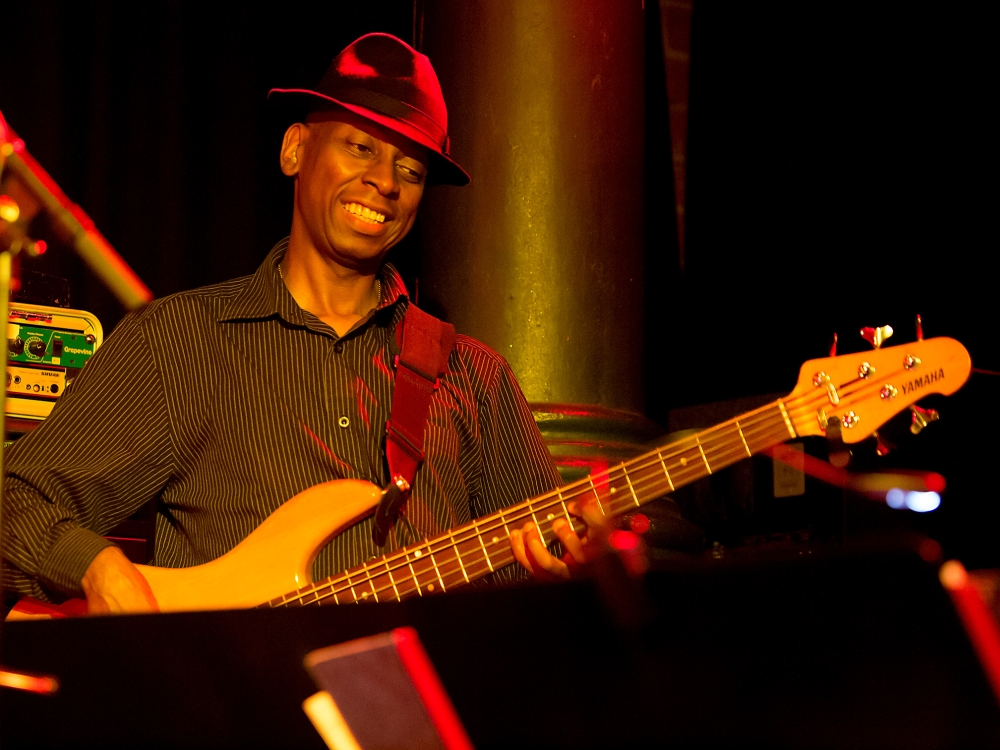
Michael Mondesir in the famous Jazz-Club „Unterfahrt“ in Munich 2022.

Michael Mondesir (born 6 February 1966 in London) is an English jazz bass guitarist, and composer. He is one of the most in demand jazz bass players in Europe, touring regularly with drummer Billy Cobham, Cream (band) drummer Ginger Baker and James Brown musical director Pee Wee Ellis. He is credited as bass player on over twenty major name jazz albums.

Brother of drummer Mark Mondesir, Michael Mondesir started playing drums at the age of 11 and moved to bass guitar when he was 16. Like his brother, he is largely self-taught. He played jazz fusion oriented music in a trio called EMJIEM (with guitarist Hawi Gondwe). Then he and his brother visited Weekend Jazz Workshops in North London organized by Ian Carr and from the late 1980s started playing with jazz musicians including the saxophonists Courtney Pine, Iain Ballamy and Steve Williamson, and with pianists Jason Rebello and Django Bates (in "Human Chain") and international musicians including Billy Cobham, Jeff Beck, John McLaughlin, and Annette Peacock.

The Rough Guide To Jazz describes Mondesir as "a superb bassist with phenomenal concentration and excellent time."

In 2009, Mondesir joined the Thriller – Live world tour celebrating the life of Michael Jackson. The Brisbane Weekender noted that Michael Mondesir "boasted instrumental skills that made the crowd go wild".

He has performed with artists including Jeff Beck, Billy Cobham, Ginger Baker, Eddie Harris, Jack DeJohnette, John McLaughlin, Oumou Sangare, Usher, Whitney Houston, Imogen Heap, Sir George Martin, State of Bengal, Hermeto Pascoal, David Garibaldi, Jan Hammer, Ty, Zoe Rahman, Jim Mullen, Ronnie Wood, John Serry Jr., Andy Summers, Django Bates, Gary Husband, Chante Moore, Lulu, Nitin Sawhney, Lenny White, Chad Smith, Courtney Pine, Jocelyn Brown Jason Rebello, Brice Wassy, Neneh Cherry, Nikki Yeoh, Bernard Purdie, Iain Ballamy Bill Bruford, Julian Joseph, Leni Stern, Mory Kante, Keith More, Trilok Gurtu, Mike Lindup, Aster Aweke, S-Club 7, Talvin Singh, Pee Wee Ellis, and Neneh Cherry.

He has taught as a freelancer at the Royal Academy of Music and at the Rhythmic Conservatory in Copenhagen.

Michael is the bass player for West End show Dream Girls in London from March 2017.

Michael also has 2 children, Julius and Ellis, of which, Julius is a Twitch streamer and amateur music producer.
