= Eddie Parker (musician) =

English musician (born 1959)

Eddie Parker (born 28 May 1959) is an English jazz flutist and composer. He also plays keyboards during workshops and live performances.

== Career ==
He was a founding member of and composer for the British jazz band Loose Tubes in the 1980s. He has toured and performed with several noted bands and performers including Bheki Mseleku, Marvin Smith and John Parricelli. He has toured with the band Mister Vertigo, of which Parricelli is also a member, and conducts jazz workshops and performances involving young musicians. He was a lecturer in jazz at Middlesex University, where his students included Led Bib.

== Discography ==
=== As leader ===
- Live Tracks with Freebop (Impetus, 1988)
- Transformations of the Lamp (FMR, 1994)
- Everything You Do to Me (FMR, 1996)

With Loose Tubes

- Loose Tubes (Loose Tubes Limited, 1985)
- Delightful Precipice (Loose Tubes Limited, 1986)
- Open Letter (Editions EG, 1988)
- Dancing On Frith Street (Lost Marble, 2010)
- Sad Afrika (Lost Marble, 2012)
- Arriving (Lost Marble, 2015)

=== As sideman ===
With Django Bates

- Music for the Third Policeman (Ah Um, 1990)
- Summer Fruits (and Unrest) (JMT, 1993)
- Winter Truce (and Homes Blaze) (JMT,/Verve 1995)

With others

- A Man Called Adam, Duende (Other, 1998)
- Keziah Jones, Blufunk Is a Fact! (Delabel, 1992)
- Bheki Mseleku, Celebration (World Circuit, 1992)
- Oumou Sangare, Ko Sira (World Circuit, 1993)
- Trevor Walters, Walters Gold with Love (Adelphi 1985)
