= Duncan Eagles =

English musical artist (born 1985)

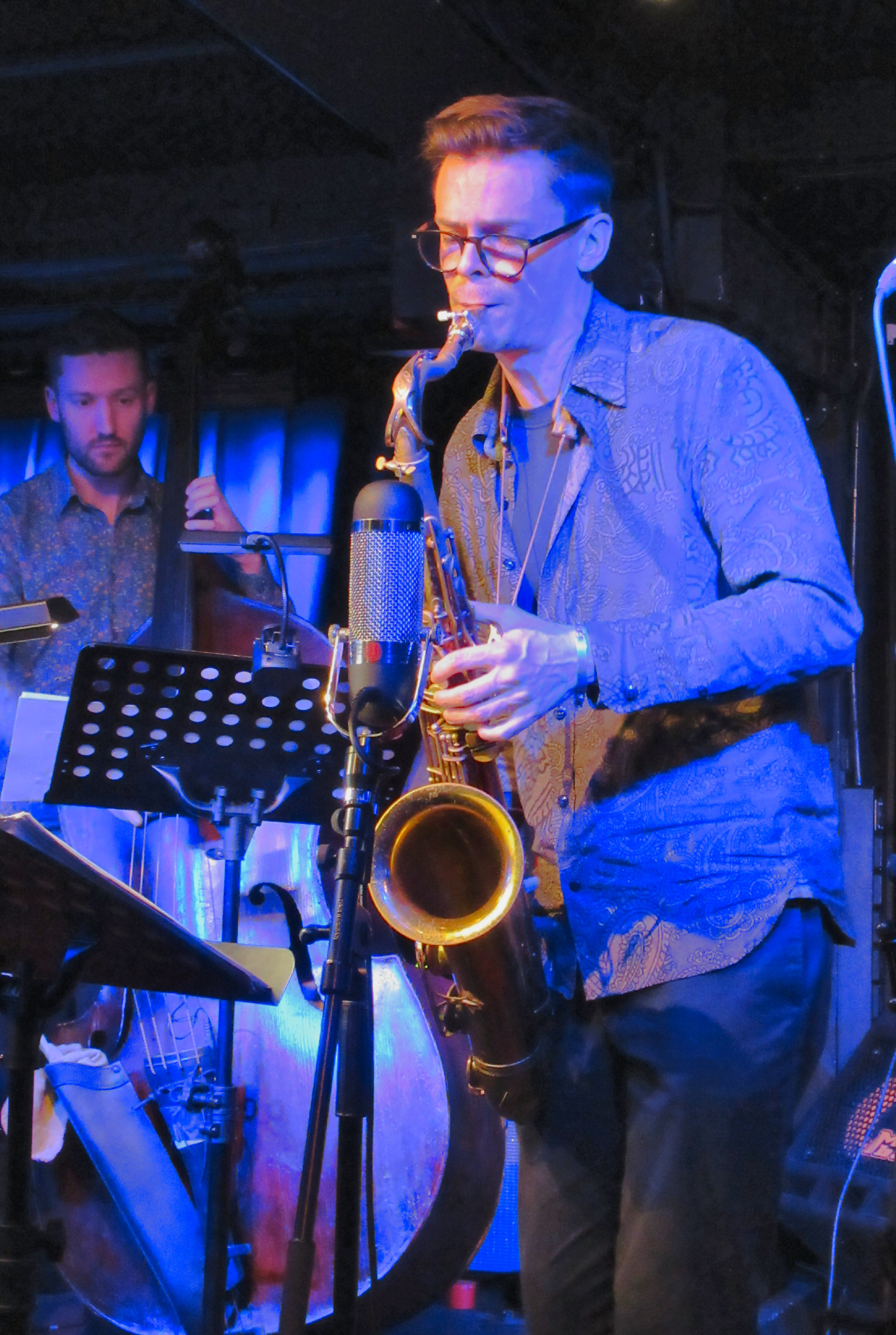
- Eagles performing at PizzaExpress Jazz Club Soho

Background information
- Born: 1985 (age 40–41); Sutton, London, England
- Genres: Jazz
- Instruments: Saxophone

Duncan Eagles (born 1985) is an English jazz saxophonist, composer and teacher. He performs in venues in Britain and at festivals around the world, in his own groups, such as Partikel, and as a sideman, having performed with Zara McFarlane, Shabaka Hutchings, Gary Husband, Melt Yourself Down, Mark Mondesir, Jason Rebello, Ola Onabule and Janek Gwizdala.

== Early life and education ==
Eagles was born in Sutton, South London. He graduated from Trinity Laban Conservatoire of Music and Dance in 2007 with a Bachelor of Music degree in jazz.

== Career ==
He was described as "fast becoming one of the most exciting players emerging on the UK jazz scene" by Jazzwise. With Partikel he has released four albums and they were described as "one of the most exciting trios in improvised music" (Jazz Podium). Their album String Theory included a string quartet. The Guardian reviewed the album, with critic John Fordham saying:

"Saxophonist Duncan Eagles has sought a fresh challenge, in balancing Partikel’s familiar free-jazzy energy with a compositional coherence that draws the textures of the string players and the trio into striking and often unexpectedly seductive accords." It was listed in The Daily Telegraph's best albums of 2015.

According to the BBC Music Magazine, "Eagles's tone on his various horns achieves an impressive blend of colours and dynamics. His compositions and arrangements, embracing sinuous, sinewy elegance, spiky funk and languid ballads, repay close attention."

He also teaches saxophone, is a tutor at the Dordogne International Jazz Summer School in France and previously at The Hideaway jazz club.

== Discography ==
- Road Ahead (2013), Mark Perry and Duncan Eagles Quintet, FIRECD65
- Citizen (2019), Duncan Eagles, Ropeadope RAD-443
- Narrations (2023), Ropeadope RAD-706

With Partikel (Duncan Eagles, Max Luthert, Eric Ford)

- Partikel (2010), CD 5060183700314
- Cohesion (2012), Whirlwind Recordings WR4618
- String Theory (2015), Whirlwind Recordings WR4671 (with Matthew Sharp, Carmen Flores, Benet McLean, David Le Page)
- Counteraction (2017), Whirlwind Recordings WR4699 (with Matthew Sharp, SiSi Lu, Anna Cooper, Ant Law, Benet McLean)
- Anniversary Song (2022) Berthold Records BR 321099

With Million Square (Max Luthert and Duncan Eagles)

- Between Suns (2018)
- Seeps a Light (2020)
- Spirit Bloom (2020)
- Fantasy Grounds (2023)
- Arcade (2024)

With Jazz Proof (Duncan Eagles, Dan Redding, George Bone, Max Luthert, Louie Palmer)

- Dinner With Dave (2010)
- Jazz Proof (2011), CD Barcode: 5055400846661

Other albums

- Uptown Blues (2011), Ramon Goose, Blues Boulevard 250300
- Sutures and Stitches (2013), Ollie Howell featuring Duncan Eagles, Mark Perry, Matt Robinson, Max Luthert
- Live at the 606 (2013), Benet McLean Band, 33Jazz Records.
- Orbital (2014), Max Luthert, Whirlwind Recordings WR4659
- The Bopped and the Bopless (2016), Benet McLean Band, 33Xtreme Records.
- Self-Identity (2017), Ollie Howell, Ropeadope
- Ask, Seek, Knock (2017), Samuel Eagles' Spirit featuring Duncan Eagles, Sam Leak, Ralph Wyld, Max Luthert, Dave Hamblett, Whirlwind Recordings WR 4709
- Two Late (2018), Tim Staffell, Strike Back Records – SBR220CD
- Khoalesce (2018), Caroline Scott, CSCD001
