= Steve Argüelles =

English jazz drummer and producer

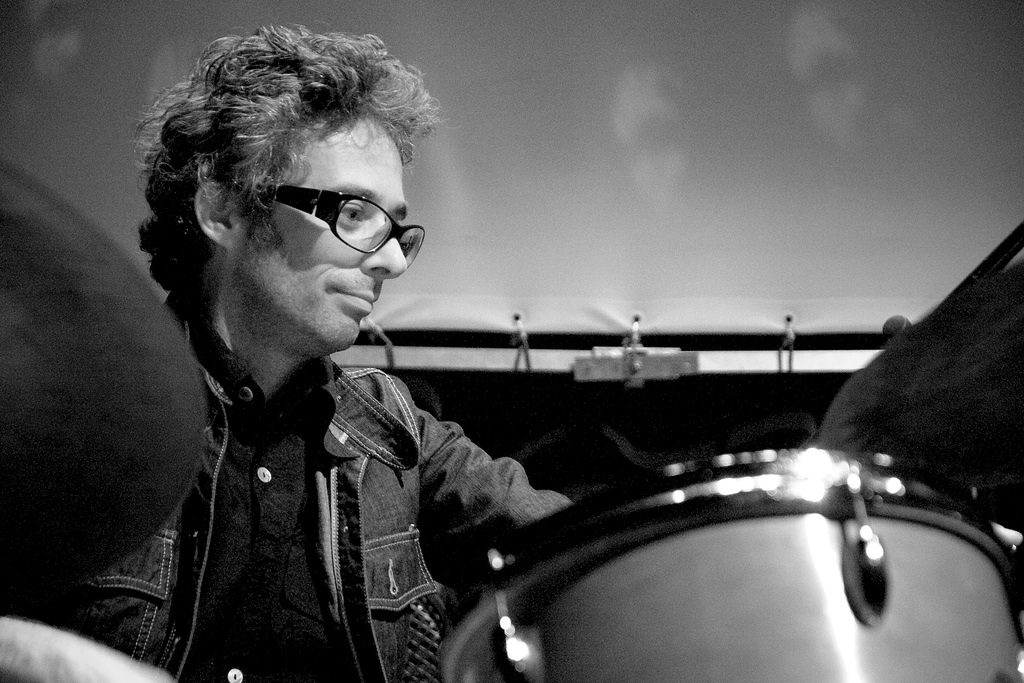

Background information
- Born: Stephen Argüelles Clarke; 16 November 1963 (age 61)
- Origin: Crowborough, Sussex, England
- Genres: Jazz
- Occupation(s): Musician, record producer, record label owner
- Instrument: Drums
- Labels: Plush
- Website: Plush

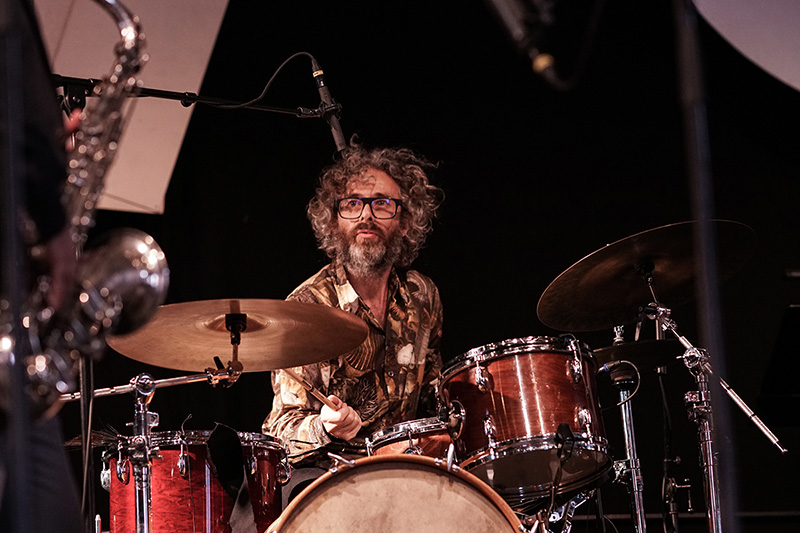
Steve Argüelles @ Aarhus Jazz Festival, Denmark 2017

Stephen Argüelles Clarke (born 16 November 1963) is an English jazz drummer, producer and is the proprietor of the Plush record label. He is the brother of saxophonist Julian Argüelles.

== Life and career ==
Argüelles was born in Crowborough, East Sussex and raised in Birmingham. From the age of 16, when he became the house drummer at Ronnie Scott's, through his seminal work as a founder of the 1980s group Loose Tubes, and his work with Django Bates in the early Human Chain, he has shown an innovation beyond the usual role of the drummer.

== Selected discography ==
- 1990 – Steve Argüelles
- 1994 – Busy Listening
- 1994 – Blue Moon in a Function Room
- 1997 – Recyclers – Circuit
- 1998 – Circuit
- 1998 – Indigo, Ig Henneman Tentet with Tristan Honsinger, Ab Baars, Theo Jörgensmann, a.o.
- 2004 – We da man!, Ambitronix (with Benoit Delbecq)
- 2005 – I.N.I.T.I.A.L..S. with John Wolf Brennan, Christy Doran and Urs Leimgruber
