= Julian Argüelles =

English jazz saxophonist

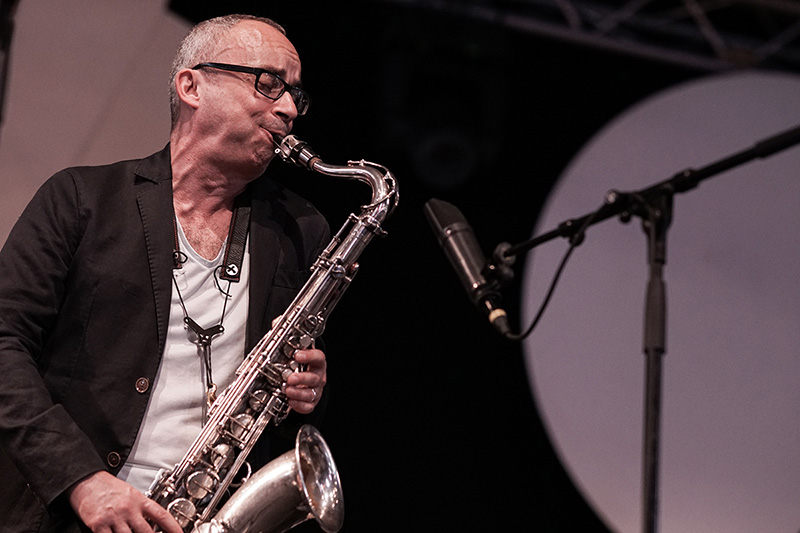
- Argüelles at Aarhus Jazz Festival, Denmark 2017

Background information
- Born: Julian Crook Argüelles; 28 January 1966 (age 60); Lichfield, Staffordshire, England
- Genres: Jazz
- Occupation: Musician
- Instrument: Saxophone
- Years active: 1984–present
- Labels: Edition, Basho, Whirlwind Recordings
- Website: julianarguelles.com

Julian Argüelles (born 28 January 1966) is an English jazz saxophonist.

He is best known for his work during the 1980s and '90s with the ensemble Loose Tubes. Argüelles has also worked extensively as a solo performer and with American and European musicians. His music combines British contemporary jazz infused with Spanish rhythms, South African grooves, brass band and classical influences. He was awarded a fellowship from the Royal Birmingham Conservatoire for his services to jazz in 2017 and received a Parliamentary Jazz Award (2016) for his album Let It Be Told.

== Life and career ==
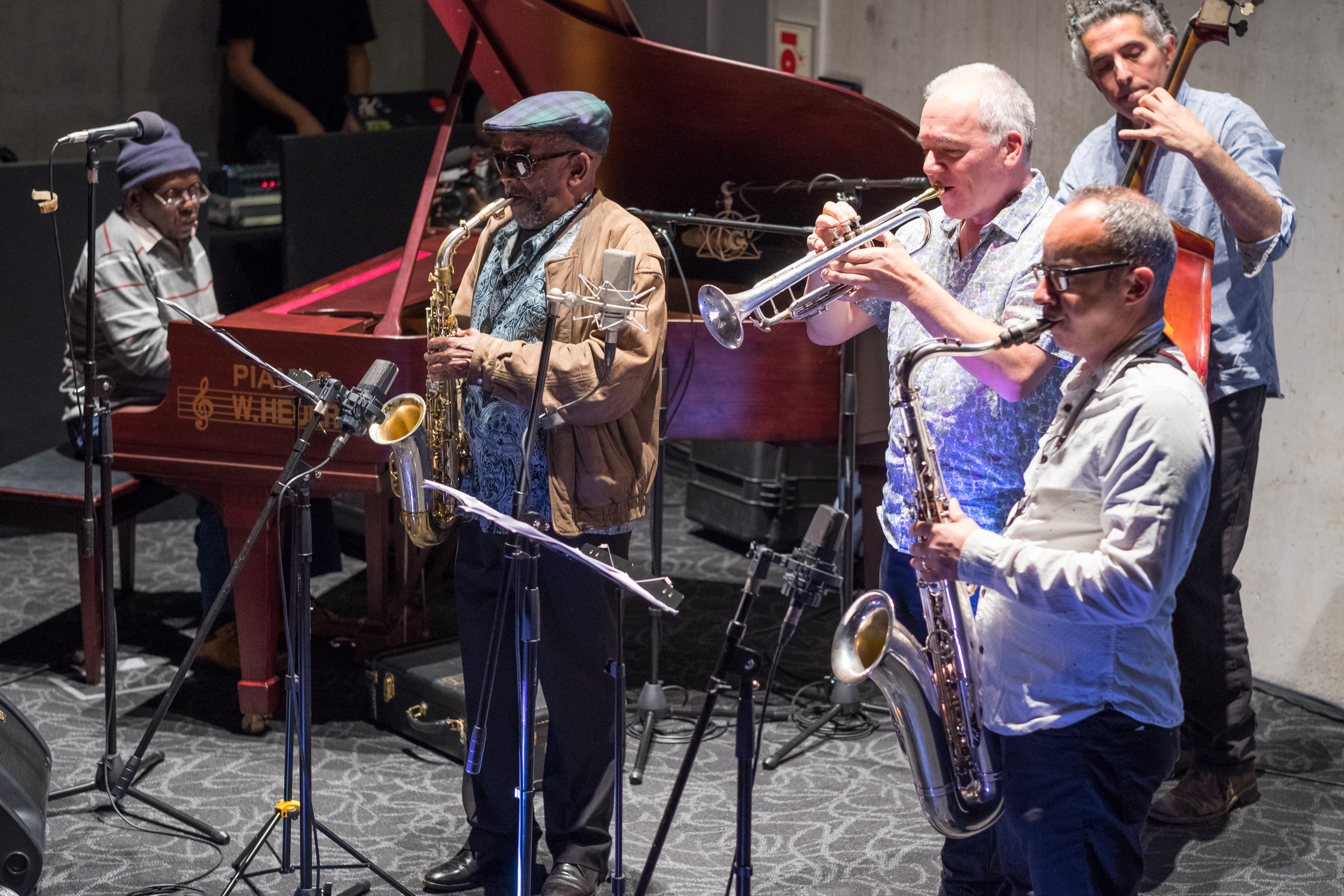
Argüelles in South Africa 2018

Born in Lichfield, Staffordshire, Argüelles was raised in Birmingham. He is the younger brother of the jazz drummer Steve Argüelles.

Argüelles started playing with big bands, including the European Community Big Band that toured throughout Europe. In 1984 he moved to London. He studied briefly at Trinity College of Music before joining Loose Tubes, staying with them for four years and recording two albums. In 1986 he received the Pat Smythe Award for young musicians. His first album, Phaedrus, included pianist John Taylor. The second, Home Truths, was a quartet which included Steve Swallow. As Above So Below was a large scale work for jazz and classical musicians with the 20 piece Trinity College of Music String Ensemble. The album evolved from a commission that was performed in Saint Wendreda's Church in March, Cambridgeshire in the Fens.

He was commissioned by BBC Radio 3 to write 60 minutes of music for an octet. It was performed and recorded at Bath International Music Festival in May 1996. The group toured and recorded the album Skull View, released in 1997 by Babel Label. His second octet album, Escapade, was released by Provocateur. Argüelles has been commissioned to write and arrange for HR Frankfurt, Phronesis, Scottish National Jazz Orchestra, Apollo Saxophone Quartet, his octet (by Birmingham Jazz), Berkshire Youth Jazz Orchestra, Walsall Youth Jazz Orchestra, Fenland Youth Symphony Orchestra, North German Radio Big Band (NDR), and Royal Academy of Music. In 1999 he received the Jazz Composers Alliance Composition Award from the U.S.

He has worked with Archie Shepp, Tim Berne, Hermeto Pascoal, John Abercrombie, Dave Holland, Peter Erskine, Chris McGregor, Evan Parker, Mike Gibbs, John Scofield, Carla Bley, Dudu Pukwana, Mário Laginha, Arturo Sandoval, and Giorgio Gaslini. He was also a member of several big bands including The HR in Frankfurt, Kenny Wheeler Big Band, Django Bates' Delightful Precipice, and Colin Towns' Mask Orchestra.

He has taught at the KUG Jazz Institute in Graz, Austria, York University, Royal Academy of Music, and Guildhall School of Music and Drama.

== Discography ==
=== As leader ===
- Phaedrus (Ah Um, 1990)
- Home Truths (Babel, 1995)
- Scapes (Babel, 1996)
- Skull View (Babel, 1997)
- Escapade (Provocateur, 1999)
- As Above So Below (Provocateur, 2003)
- Partita (Basho, 2006)
- Momenta (Basho, 2009)
- Inner Voices (Tone of a Pitch, 2009)
- Circularity (CAM Jazz, 2014)
- Let It Be Told (Basho, 2015)
- Tetra (Whirlwind, 2015)
- The Behemoth (Edition, 2017)
- Setembro (Edition, 2017)
- Tonadas (Edition, 2018)

=== As sideman ===
With Django Bates

- Summer Fruits (and Unrest) (JMT, 1993)
- Winter Truce (and Homes Blaze) (JMT, 1995)

With Mário Laginha

- Hoje (Farol Música, 1994)

With Carla Bley

- Big Band Theory (1993)
- The Carla Bley Big Band Goes to Church (1996)

With Andy Sheppard

- Rhythm Method (Blue Note International, 1993)

With Loose Tubes

- Delightful Precipice (1986)
- Open Letter (1988)

With Kenny Wheeler

- Music for Large and Small Ensembles (ECM, 1990)
- The Long Waiting (2012)

With Samo Salamon

- Nano (Goga, 2006)
- Unity (Samo Records, 2016)
- The Colours Suite (Clean Feed Records, 2017)
