= Billy Jenkins (musician) =

English guitarist, composer, and bandleader

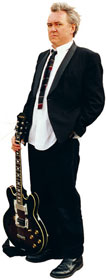

Background information
- Born: 5 July 1956 (age 70); Bromley, England
- Genres: Jazz, blues
- Occupations: Guitarist, composer, bandleader
- Instrument: Guitar
- Years active: 1970s–present
- Labels: Babel, VOTP
- Website: www.billyjenkins.com

Charles William Jenkins (born 5 July 1956) known as Billy Jenkins is an English blues and improvising guitarist, bandleader and composer. As a boy, he was a parish church chorister and sang in occasional invited choirs at Westminster Abbey and St. Paul's Cathedral.

As a teenager he toured and recorded for legendary Arista record label boss Clive Davis with art rock band Burlesque (1972–77); performed as a young adult with 'alternative musical comedy' duo The Fantastic Trimmer & Jenkins (1979–82) and drummer Ginger Baker before founding (in 1981) the VOGC (the Voice of God Collective - 'The voice of the people is the voice of God' [attrib. Plato and others] - to which BJ adds, '...and the religion is music!' ).

Since then he has produced a large body of over 40 recorded albums including 'Scratches of Spain', 'Motorway At Night', 'Entertainment USA' and 'Music For Two Cassette Machines'. Some of his recordings are about his SE London environs and include 'Sounds Like Bromley', 'Greenwich', 'Still Sounds Like Bromley' and 'Suburbia'.

From 1983 - 93 he lived and worked at Wood Wharf Rehearsal Studios in Greenwich, where he welcomed an average of 26.6 musicians through the doors every day.

Projects have included recording and performing with The Fun Horns of Berlin, improvised musical boxing Big Fights, Music For Low Strung Guitar, directing Anglo-Belgium and London Meets Vienna ensembles, improvising to film, collaborating in words and music with Ian McMillan, Ben Watson, Kate Pullinger a.o., composing and performing with The Gogomagogs, compositions for six guitars, 'The Drum Machine Plays The Battlemarch Of Consumerism' for six drum kits, curating the Vortex World Cup Jazz Ball and sporadic festival and club appearances on the continent and UK.

Member of the Arts Council of England Improvised Touring panel from 1993 - 98.

He has been nominated three times for a Paul Hamlyn Foundation award - in 2008, 2010 and 2011.

In education, he was Visiting Tutor in Guitar Techniques at Lewisham F.E.College (1990–96), guest lecturer at the Royal Academy of Music '95, Guest big band director at Middlesex University '96. Ensemble Masterclasses at the International Summeracademy Freie Kunstschule, Berlin '97. 'Moving On' music workshops with Andy Sheppard a.o., Belfast '99. Musical Director and workshop leader for Greenwich Young People's Jazz Orchestra, Blackheath 2000. School Workshops with the Pied Piper Project, Yorkshire, March 2001. Visiting Artist on the Jazz Faculty at Trinity College of Music (2001-2) and at the Royal Academy of Music from 2002 to 2009.

From 1995 he performed live with his Blues Collective, solo, or duo with fellow guitarist Steve Morrison in Here Is The Blues! He also appeared as 'Billy the Aviator' in Tom Bancroft's award winning musical children's show 'Kidsamonium'.

At the 2010 London Jazz Festival, he performed with the BBC Big Band playing his music arranged by long time VOGC saxophonist Iain Ballamy, and directed by saxophonist Julian Siegal but since then, he has ceased travelling and performing.

Two recent album releases were selected by Mojo Magazine as a 'Top Ten Underground Album Of The Year' in both 2014 and 2015.

In 2016, his album 'True Love Collection' (released in 1998) was voted by BBC and Jazz FM presenters, jazz musicians, critics and journalists as one of the '50 Greatest Ever Jazz Albums'.

Having spent seven years (2008–14) creating and conducting humanist funerals in SE London, he has returned to researching, composing, writing and recording - but his hyperacusis (over-sensitivity to sound), tinnitus and various other proudly borne 'industrially related' minor, but chronic, physical and psychological issues severely limit his music making.

However, to celebrate his 60th birthday year in 2016, creative photographer and former jazz columnist Beowulf Mayfield persuaded the guitarist to partake in twenty four short podcast episodes of the Billy Jenkins Listening Club. Presented by Beowulf and written by Mr Jenkins, each episode focuses on an album or tracks from the extensive recorded discography and also features several of his musical and recording collaborators.

== Early life ==
Charles William Jenkins, known as Billy, was born on the 5th July 1956 in Bromley, Kent. The second of four children and the only son to Joan Margaret Jenkins (nee Stonhill), known as Peggy (1925-2000), an artist, puppeteer and former costumier at RADA and Graham Charles Jenkins (1928-2009), a former General Secretary to the Society of Chiropodists, one time president of the Pedestrian’s Association, founder chairman of the Bromley Town Plan Action Group and a Freeman of the City of London. His godfather was his uncle the Rev David Jenkins.

Elementary musical training:

Violin tuition under Elinor M. Isard LRAM age 9-11 (Grade 1 Distinction).

Also basic piano (under Beth Cockett) & viola (under Leonard Davis) age 11-12.

Chorister at Bromley Parish Church under Michael Bailey FRCO, ARCM age 10-12.

Also occasional invited choirs at Westminster Abbey and St. Paul's Cathedral.Self taught on guitar from age 12.

Performed in local church halls, USAF Bases in East Anglia, riverside pubs, local colleges and clubs under various names 1970-72.

He was raised in a bohemian 23 room former hotel in Widmore Road, Bromley, with no central heating, television or car, but with a large garden cum smallholding within which his father was always cultivating. There was a frequent turn round of lodgers occupying the top floor, an annual arrival of a student lodger from the nearby teaching’s training Stockwell College and a twice yearly puppet show in the built in puppet theatre in the living room where a young Billy and his big sister Caroline would accompany on violins. As a young teenager, Billy started regular jam sessions in the derelict, self contained basement, which attracted many local contemporaries to either take part, like Billy’s best friend at the time, Bill Broad, later to become Billy Idol, or those who just hung out, like the soon to be author Hanif Kureishi, artist Kevin J. Collins and Steven Bailey, later to become Steven Severin.

== Personal life ==
Billy was the second of four children and the only son. Eldest sister, Caroline was born in 1953. Billy in 1956, Lizzie in 1959 and Jenny in 1962. They were all born in their parents’ bedroom in Widmore Road.

In 1970, a student lodger moved in by the name of Annie Canny. Thirteen years later, they got back in touch and they started co-managing Wood Wharf Rehearsal Studios on the River Thames in Greenwich, SE London.

They were blessed with their twins Harriet Lettice Canny Jenkins and Alice Mecedes Canny Jenkins on the 17th September 1984.

In 2002, with Harriet and Alice reaching the age of eighteen, Jenkins bade farewell to Annie and his beloved twins and began living with Jill Tritton, whom he had met at the Francis Drake Bowls Club in Brockley SE London. They were married in 2008, making Billy a stepfather to Gabriel Pol (born 1969), an award winning creative garden designer and a step grandfather to Ruben Pol (born 2001), musician, actor and filmmaker. Sadly, Gabiel took his own life in 2023.

Alice’s children, Daniel (born 2010) and Thomas (born 2013), Billy’s grandchildren, have both appeared in a Beowulf Mayfield YouTube ‘music-snap’ promoting Billy’s music. And Daniel played the part of a young Billy on one of the Billy Jenkins Listening Club podcasts.

== Discography ==
Studio albums

- Sounds Like Bromley (VOTP, 1982)
- Piano Sketches, 1973 - 1984 (Wood Wharf Records, 1984)
- Beyond E Major (Allmusic Records, 1985)
- Greenwich (Woodwharf Records,1985)
- Uncommerciality Vol 1 (VOTP,1986)
- Scratches of Spain (Babel, 1987)
- In the Nude: Standards, Vol. 1 (VOTP, 1988)
- Round Midnight Cowboy: Standards, Vol 2 (VOTP, 1988)
- Motorway At Night (VOTP, 1988)
- Uncommerciality Vol 2 (VOTP, 1988)
- Blue Moon in a Function Room: Standards Vol 3 (VOTP, 1990)
- Big Fights No.1 Jenkins v. Steve Argüelles (VOTP, 1991)
- Big Fights No.2 Jenkins v. Steve Noble (VOTP, 1991)
- Big Fights No.3 Jenkins v. Thebe Lipere (VOTP, 1991)
- Uncommerciality, Vol 3 (VOTP 1991)
- Actual Reality - music for two cassette machines (VOTP 1992)
- Entertainment USA (Babel, 1994)
- East West (Babel, 1996)
- S.A.D (Babel, 1996)
- Still Sounds Like Bromley (Babel, 1997)
- True Love Collection (Babel, 1998)
- Suburbia (Babel, 1999)
- sadtimes.co.uk (VOTP, 2000)
- Blues Zero 2 (VOTP, 2002)
- LIFE (VOTP, 2002)
- When the Crowds Have Gone (Babel, 2004)
- Born Again (And the Religion is the Blues) (VOTP, 2010)
- I Am A Man From Lewisham (VOTP, 2010)
- BORN AGAIN (And The Religion Is The Blues) (VOTP, 2010)
- Jazz Gives Me The Blues (VOTP, 2011)
- The Semi-detached Suburban Home (VOTP, 2014)
- Death, Ritual & Resonation (VOTP, 2015)
- Ghost Music (VOTP, 2018)

Live albums

- Wiesen '87 (VOTP, 1987)
- Jazz Cafe Concerts Vol 1 (VOTP, 1989)
- Jazz Cafe Concerts Vol 2 (VOTP, 1989)
- Billy Jenkins / Fun Horns: Mayfest ‘94 (Babel, 1995)
- Songs of Praise Live (Babel, 2007)

Compilation albums

- First Aural Art Exhibition (1992)

DVD

- Blues Al Fresco (2003)
- Ain't Going Yet (2006)

With Burlesque

- Acupuncture (Arista Records, 1977)
- Burlesque (Arista Records, 1977)

With Trimmer & Jenkins

- I Love Parties (Charisma, 1979)
- Times Are B.A.D. (Charisma, 1979)
- Live From London's Fabulous Comic Strip (Charisma, 1979)

With Ginger Baker's Nutters

- Ginger Baker in Concert (Onsala, 1987)
- Ginger Baker's Nutters - Live in Milan, Italy 1981 (Voiceprint, 2010)
- Ginger Baker's Nutters - Live At The Marquee Club 1981 (MIG Music, 2024).

== See also ==
- The Oxcentrics
