= John Eacott =

British jazz trumpeter and composer

John Eacott (born 19 December 1960) is a British jazz trumpeter and composer.

== Life ==
=== Beginnings, early influences ===
John Eacott was born in Reading, Berkshire, United Kingdom. His father Kenneth Eacott was a pianist, arranger and composer. His mother Joy Pocock was a dancer and drummer in the family band, in which John started playing trumpet aged seven.

In the mid 1970s the family moved to Hayling Island where a lifelong love for the sea, sailing and navigation took hold. It was here where he was introduced to free jazz, leading him to meet Mark Lockheart. In the 1980s John Eacott got a 'Psion Organiser' and started to experiment with computer programming.

=== Working Life (1982 – present) ===
On graduating from Sussex University, England, in 1982 BA Music, Eacott's career as a musician started with anarchic jazzers Loose Tubes (trumpet, composer), post-industrial metal bashers Test Dept (trumpet, arranger, composer), Roman Holliday, acid jazz group Vibraphonic, and as a trumpeter with a diverse array of artists including Damon Albarn, Goldie, Stereo MCs, The The, Georgie Fame, Terry Edwards and the Scapegoats. He performed with Loose Tube (30 Years Anniversary concerts), and regularly plays with Sarah-Jane Morris, the hKippers, his own Cranky Trio and other bands.

Since the 1990s he has composed works for theatre including the worldwide touring production of Gormenghast,'. In 2012 he composed music for the Royal Shakespeare Company (RSC) production of The Taming of the Shrew, in 2014 Turgenev's Fortune's Fool at the Old Vic, London and most recently Charles Dickens' Great Expectations in 2016, at the West Yorkshire Playhouse in Leeds; all plays directed by Lucy Bailey.

Film scores include the Miramax feature Three Steps to Heaven (1995), Escape to Life with Vanessa Redgrave (2000) and worked as arranger with Dave Stewart and Mick Jagger on the soundtrack of Alfie starring Jude Law (2004).

In the autumn of 1998 John Eacott performed his first live generative composition in London, UK. He developed his generative composition in two Sound Art exhibitions at Morley Gallery, London, 'Strange Attraction' in 1999 and 'Another Strange Attraction' in 2000 which featured amongst others the interactive sound designer Dominic Robson and sound sculptor Max Eastley.

In 2001 Eacott made a generative music album 'Morpheus' together with Nick Collins, Frederik Oloffson and others using SuperCollider audio programming environment. These compositions formed part of a number of projects that contributed to his PhD 'Contents May Vary: the behaviour and play of generative music artefacts' (2007) awarded by the University of Westminster.

Since the completion of his PhD, Eacott has focused on making accessible live performances using algorithmic composition as part of the organisation Informal. Floodtide, which premiered at Trinity Buoy Wharf, Docklands in June 2008, is a musical performance generated by tidal flow. Floodtide works by submerging a sensor into tidal water, the data from which is transformed by custom computer software, into notation read live from computer screens by musicians. Floodtide has been performed numerous times, most notably at Southbank Centre's See Further-Festival of Science and Arts in 2010 and the Mayor's Thames Festival in 2009. A permanent tidal sensor (provided by Nortek) is installed at Trinity Buoy Wharf which gives a constant reading of Thames tidal data on the Floodtide website. Musicians anywhere in the world can play the music generated at any time. Trinity Buoy Wharf is also the home for a Floodtide sound sculpture (2014) by Andrew Baldwin, that continuously plays live local tidal readings. In 2015 John Eacott took the Floodtide project on a five months tour on Jacomina, a 46 ft sailing yacht, performing the piece in ports in Europe and UK with local musicians.

Eacott's work Hour Angle works in a similar way to Floodtide, yet its notation is generated by calculating the movement of the sun. Hour Angle performances include the summer solstice of 2010 at Royal Observatory Greenwich.

He has taught at London College of Communication's and Middlesex University; he worked as Principal Lecturer in Music at University of Westminster between 1993 and 2011.

== Selected works ==
=== Algorithmic works ===
- 2015 Floodtide Navigate five months European & UK tour by sailing yacht, site specific performances with local musicians
- 2008 – ongoing Floodtide – music generated live from tidal flow.
- 2008 Hour Angle – music generated live from the declination and hour angle of the sun.
- 2003 Intelligent Street – a work where users can affect soundscape by sending text messages.
- 2002 Diffusion – a package of generative jingles for radio station Resonance FM.
- 2001 Emotions – nominated for BAFTA in 2002.
- 2001 Morpheus – an album of generative tunes published by mushi mushi.

=== Theatre ===
- 2016 West Yorkshire Playhouse Theatre production of Great Expectations
- 2014 The Old Vic Theatre production of Fortune's Fool
- 2012 Royal Shakespeare Company production of Taming of the Shrew.
- 2002 Royal Shakespeare Company production of Timon of Athens (arrangements.)
- 1992 Gormenghast for the David Glass Ensemble

=== Film scores ===
- 2003 Alfie starring Jude Law the jazz club (arrangements.)
- 2000 Escape to Life with Vanessa Redgrave
- 1997 A Bit of Scarlet
- 1995 3 Steps to Heaven
- 1992 Caught Looking
- 1991 North of Vortex

=== Television soundtracks ===
- 1997 In the Footsteps of Alexander the Great BBC2 documentary series
