= Ashley Slater =

Canadian-British musician (born 1961)

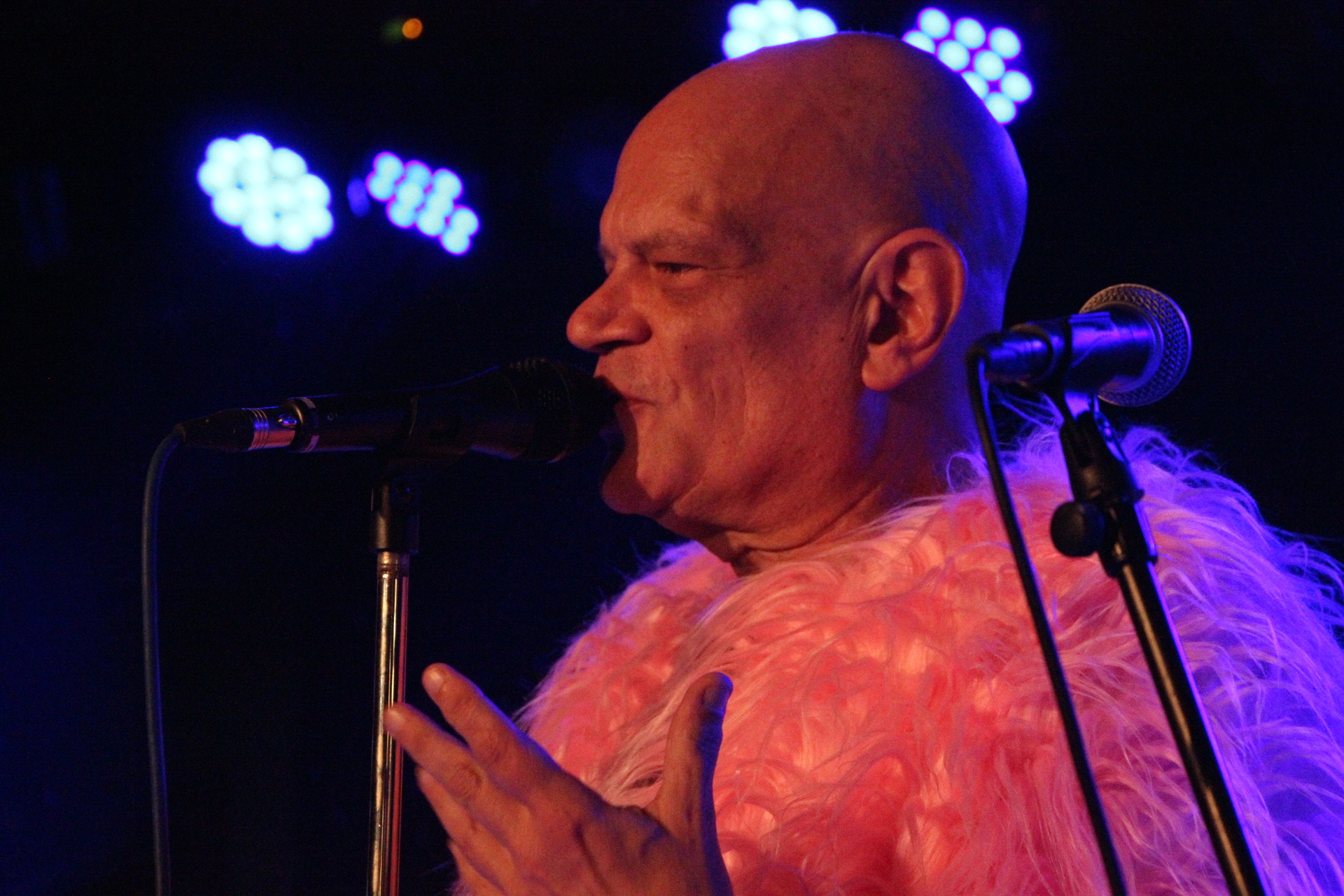
- Slater performing with Freak Power

Background information
- Born: 1961 (age 64–65); Schefferville, Quebec, Canada
- Origin: Hanford, California, US
- Genre: Electronic
- Occupations: Musician, singer, songwriter
- Instruments: Trombone, tuba, vocals

Ashley Slater (born 1961) is a Canadian-British musician who is best known for his narration on the television series Boo! as well as his work with Norman Cook (a.k.a. Fatboy Slim) in the band Freak Power.

== Career ==
In 1983 after leaving the army, Slater attended the National Centre for Orchestral Studies, after which he joined the jazz orchestral collective Loose Tubes. Over the next few years he was the bass and tenor trombonist of choice for George Russell, Carla Bley, Andrew Poppy, El Sonido de Londres, Billy Jenkins, Django Bates and Andy Sheppard.

== Discography ==
=== As leader ===
- The Human Groove (1988), with Microgroove
- Big Lounge (2002)
- Cellophane (2008)

With Kitten & The Hip

- Hello Kitten (2014)

With Freak Power

- Drive-Thru Booty (1995)
- More of Everything for Everybody (1996)

With Loose Tubes

- Loose Tubes (1985)
- Delightful Precipice (1986)
- Open Letter (1988)

With Kin Chi Kat

- You Think You Love Me (2019)

=== With others ===
- Billy Jenkins, Scratches of Spain (1987)
- Cardiacs, A Little Man and a House and the Whole World Window (1988)
- George Russell, The London Concert (1990)
- Carla Bley, The Very Big Carla Bley Band (1991)
- Iain Ballamy, Mirrormask: Original Motion Picture Soundtrack (2005), Molecular Gastronomy (2007)
- Dub Pistols, Back to Daylight from the Album Rum & Coke (2009)
- Monkey Business, Id Song and London Dealing from the Album Twilight of Jesters? (2009)
- John Zorn and The SPIKE Orchestra, Cerberus: Book of Angels Volume 26 (2015)
