= Earthworks (band) =

British jazz band led by drummer Bill Bruford

Bill Bruford's Earthworks
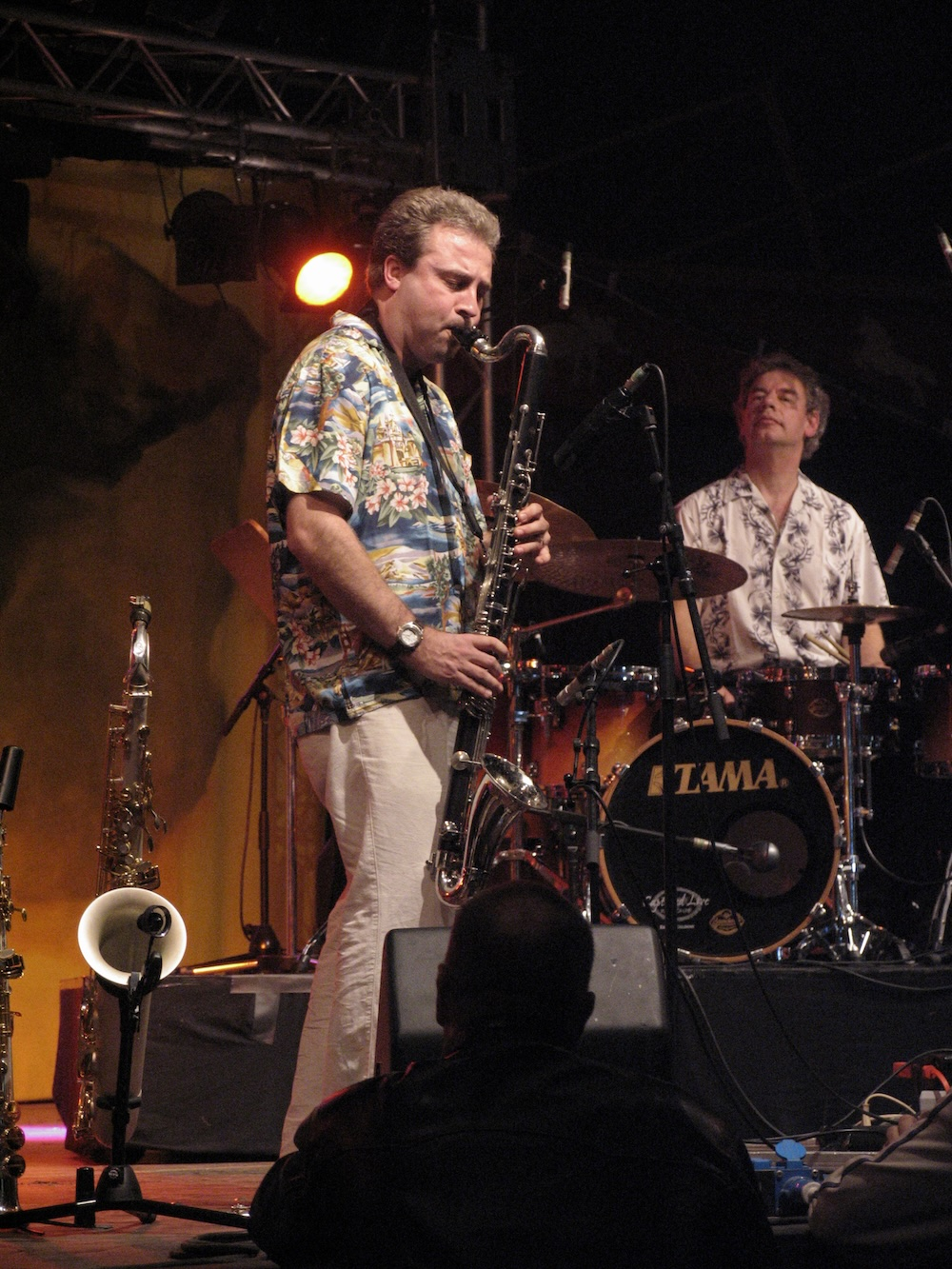
- Earthworks Bruford & Garland, Moers Festival 2004

Background information
- Origin: England
- Genre: Jazz fusion
- Years active: 1986–2009
- Labels: E.G., Discipline Global Mobile, Summerfold
- Past members: List of past members

Bill Bruford's Earthworks was a British jazz band led by drummer Bill Bruford. The band recorded several albums for Editions EG, Discipline Global Mobile and Summerfold Records.

Earthworks went through several line-ups: in addition to the band's accomplishments as a unit, Earthworks was a training ground for Django Bates, Iain Ballamy, Patrick Clahar, Mark Hodgson, Steve Hamilton, and Gwilym Simcock. The final band line-up featured previously established jazz musicians in the form of Chick Corea sideman Tim Garland and veteran bass player Laurence Cottle. In interviews during the band's earlier years, Bruford sometimes compared his responsibilities within it as being similar to those of Art Blakey with the Jazz Messengers, in that he was providing an environment for young British jazz players to gain attention and experience before going on to become well-known players and bandleaders in their own right.

The initial version of Earthworks strongly stressed an acoustic/electronic jazz fusion style, balancing Bruford's electronic Simmons drums (frequently used for melodic or chordal parts) and Bates' synthesizer work against the traditional acoustic elements of Ballamy's saxophones and Bates' tenor horn. Although the band's initial formation featured a double bass, the band subsequently used an electric bass guitar until 1993. From 1998 onwards, Earthworks was predominantly an acoustic band, with double bass and piano rather than electric instruments and with Bruford returning to an acoustic drum kit. The group disbanded in 2009 upon Bruford's initial retirement the same year.

== History ==
=== Background ===
A professional musician since 1968, Bill Bruford had originally been a drum superstar in the British progressive rock movement. Initially becoming famous with the band Yes (with whom he spent five years), he recorded the landmark albums Fragile and Close To The Edge before quitting the band in 1972 on the verge of huge financial success. He went on to join King Crimson, with whom he cut several albums culminating in 1974's Red. By the late 1970s Bruford had also put in stints with Genesis, Gong, Roy Harper, National Health and U.K.

Bruford's drumming style and musical outlook had always strongly and sincerely referenced jazz. He began to explore this area more formally in Bruford, the jazz-rock fusion band he led between 1977 and 1980 and which (among others) featured future fusion superstars Allan Holdsworth and Jeff Berlin, as well as National Health keyboardist Dave Stewart. By 1984 (and while coming off the end of a four-year King Crimson reunion), Bruford's interest in playing jazz had been revived by his improvising piano-and-drums partnership with Patrick Moraz. By now a firm advocate and endorser of the Simmons electronic drum kit, Bruford began to explore how this instrument could be introduced into a creative jazz context.

=== Earthworks mark 1 (1986–1993) ===
==== Foundation (1986) ====
Bruford initially established Earthworks in 1986 as The Bill Bruford Quartet with a line-up of himself on acoustic and Simmons drums, Django Bates on keyboards, tenor horn and trumpet, Iain Ballamy on saxophone and Mick Hutton on double bass. Both Ballamy and Bates were continuing members of the legendary British big band Loose Tubes, while Hutton had previously collaborated with Bates in the latter's band Humans (later Human Chain) and was also playing with both Ballamy and Bates in the quartet First House (led by alto saxophonist Ken Stubbs). In 1986, all three had been playing together in a putative Ballamy-led band when Bruford got in touch. Ballamy would comment in 2003 that Bruford had in effect joined Ballamy's band rather than setting up his own from scratch, although admitting Bruford "(would) probably see it a different way." Following a debut tour in Japan, the band formally changed their name to Bill Bruford's Earthworks.

==== Debut album, early tours (1986–1988) ====
In October 1986, the band recorded their debut album, Earthworks, with frequent Bruford collaborator Dave Stewart in the producer's chair. Stewart also contributed bass synthesizer and "very occasional" keyboards (most notably on "Making a Song and Dance" and "Pressure") while his wife and musical partner Barbara Gaskin added sampled vocals to Ballamy's ballad "It Needn’t End In Tears". The album also featured the first outing for Bates’ composition "Emotional Shirt". Live work continued in 1987 around Bruford's work with David Torn and others and Bates' and Ballamy's commitments to Loose Tubes. Gigs in Britain and the USA were generally well received, and the band completed the year with a 22-date German tour.

In summer 1988, Earthworks toured again. This tour was blighted by imminent tragedy (Ballamy's girlfriend Jess had developed terminal cancer) and internal tension between Hutton and Ballamy, which culminated in the two men coming to blows backstage at a concert in Bergen University in Norway. The West Coast leg of the planned American tour was ultimately abandoned in order to allow Ballamy to fly home to marry Jess and spend the last few weeks of her life with her. One final concert (the second of two shows that day) at the Minneapolis Riverfest was played as a trio, with Bates playing Ballamy's parts on tenor horn (while continuing to cover his main role as keyboard player).

==== Tim Harries replaces Mick Hutton; Dig? album; interruptions (late 1988–1990) ====
Having given Ballamy some time to mourn and with Mick Hutton having left the band following the American tour, Earthworks reconvened in autumn 1988 with a new bass player, Tim Harries (another former Bates collaborator who’d also played with Steeleye Span). As well as double bass, Harries played electric bass guitar and was an accomplished funk player, further emphasising the "electric jazz" aspect of the band. This lineup recorded the second Earthworks album, Dig?, in Cornwall in November. The album was a far more unified band effort, without the sometimes excessive producer involvement displayed on the debut album.

In December 1988, Bruford became involved with a rock music project headed by his former Yes colleague Jon Anderson (which soon revealed itself to be the all-but-in-name Yes reunion, Anderson Bruford Wakeman Howe). The resulting album and tour took up most of his time for the remaining year, although Earthworks played a 12-date European tour in June. Work on a second Anderson Bruford Wakeman Howe album took up most of 1990, especially when the band was drawn into an eight-man Yes reunion. By now, Bruford had become disillusioned with his Yes-related work and welcomed the opportunity to escape on two Earthworks tours, one in June and the other in October.

==== All Heaven Broke Loose album; further touring (1991–1992) ====
Earthworks reconvened in January 1991 to record their third album, All Heaven Broke Loose, in Germany, with Bruford and David Torn co-producing. The album recording—set against the background of the First Gulf War—was "difficult" (according to Bruford). The Earthworks situation was not improved by Bruford's involvement with the Yes "Union" tour during the first half of the year, although Earthworks did manage concerts in Europe and Japan in the autumn. (Another warning of changes to come had already arrived on the Yes tour with the humiliating breakdown of Bruford's Simmons drum kit onstage at Madison Square Garden on 15 June, necessitating a quick return to a minimal acoustic kit.)

On its release, All Heaven Broke Loose was greeted as Earthworks' most accomplished album to date. It featured the first appearance of the future Django Bates standard "Candles Still Flicker In Romania's Dark". Co-producer Torn's trademark atmospheric looping technique is clearly audible in the introduction of tracks such as "Forget-Me-Not" and "Temple of the Winds". In early 1992, Earthworks played more dates in Germany. Following Bruford's final commitments to the "Union" tour in March, the band reconvened in April and July for the Trans-Canada jazz festivals.

==== End of Earthworks mark 1 (1993) ====
In 1993, Earthworks played an eighteen-date German tour culminated by an "excellent" and well-received concert at the Jazz Café, London. Despite Earthworks’ revived musical opportunities, practical problems were beginning to dog the band. By this point, Bruford was increasingly aware of the technical limitations of the electronic Simmons drums he had once championed. Although arguably the most advanced electronic percussion set in existence, the Simmons kit's pioneering technology meant that it was difficult to service, fragile (as evidenced by frequent damage at airport baggage reclaim), unpredictable, and unreliable (as had been humiliatingly demonstrated at the Yes concert in Madison Square Garden). Furthermore, it enforced a rigidity of playing style that handicapped both Bruford and the musicians he worked with. Bruford now realised that the nature of the Simmons drums worked against "the suppleness and flexibility required for jazz performance" and concluded (with regret) that Earthworks had "reverted to being a rock group with some jazz musicians in it."

An equally pressing problem was the fact that Django Bates had now outgrown Earthworks. With the release of his second album, Summer Fruits (And Unrest), his own career as a bandleader was beginning to take off. As both composer and performer, Bates was a key part of the band, and his imminent and inevitable departure would irrevocably change it. Following a "last, stiff, uncomfortable date" in September 1993, the first lineup of Earthworks came to an end, and all four musicians went their separate ways. The band would be commemorated with a live album (1994's Live – Stamping Ground, taken mostly from American dates) and the subsequent compilation Heavenly Bodies. Ballamy would continue to work with Bates and to develop his own solo career, while Harries continued with Steeleye Span and session work.

=== Earthworks mark 2 (1997–2008) ===
==== Foundation (late 1997–early 1998) ====
Between 1994 and 1997, Bruford returned to his progressive rock career, this time with a revived King Crimson. He had, however, continued to do jazz-related work with the Buddy Rich Big Band and with his fusion group Bruford Levin Upper Extremities (B.L.U.E.), which also featured Tony Levin, Chris Botti and David Torn. Most notably, in 1997 Bruford recorded a full-fledged jazz album with American jazz stars Ralph Towner and Eddie Gómez, called If Summer Had Its Ghosts.

Having retreated from the soured King Crimson situation in late 1997, Bruford met the young Scottish pianist Steve Hamilton, whose musicianship inspired him to launch a new version of Earthworks. With Hamilton on board, Bruford recruited double bass player Geoff Gascoigne and former Incognito saxophonist Patrick Clahar (the latter a former acid jazz and funk musician intent on pursuing and developing his jazz roots). In comparison to the electro-acoustic experimentation of the original band, the second version of Earthworks was an almost entirely acoustic band, with Bruford now having abandoned electronic drums altogether and returned to an acoustic kit (uniquely configured in symmetrical fashion). The only electronic instrumentation in the band was the infrequent use of a digital keyboard synthesizer by Hamilton.

==== Renewed touring; A Part, and Yet Apart (1998–1999) ====
In late 1998, following initial UK concerts, the band (now featuring a new double bass player, Mark Hodgson) began recording the fourth Earthworks album, A Part, and Yet Apart. The album featured a set of new tunes, almost entirely written by a revitalised and confident Bruford. This was in contrast to the previous Earthworks lineup, in which Bates and Ballamy had written a much greater proportion of the material.

In January 1999 the new Earthworks played in the United States, visiting California and the East Coast. Reviews were encouraging to fair (and certainly better than the review of the subsequent London gig) and encouraged a return trip to America in October, during which the band played up and down the East Coast. The tour included Earthworks’ first gig at New York's legendary Birdland club. During the same year, A Part, And Yet Apart was released on Earthworks' new record label (the King Crimson associated Discipline Global Mobile) and the band played at jazz festivals in Eastern Europe.

By this point (and in spite of financial incentives to do otherwise), Bruford had firmly ditched the rock music past which had dogged him since his first jazz-related projects in the late 1970s. He was now concentrating entirely on a jazz approach. As part of this he had become not only the bandleader and main composer for Earthworks, but also (in true cottage industry fashion) the band's manager, booking agent and publicist.

==== Work with Larry Coryell; The Sound of Surprise (2000–2001) ====
During 2000, Earthworks played several London dates with veteran jazz guitar star Larry Coryell, who subsequently covered for Patrick Clahar for a Spanish tour, which the saxophonist had to miss due to illness. In October, the band embarked on a 19-date British tour and began recording their next album in the last months of the year, with Bruford producing in addition to his other duties.

Earthworks toured Japan, Spain, South Africa and the western UK prior to the May 2001 release of the band's fifth studio album, The Sound of Surprise. Once again, the music had been predominantly composed by Bruford, but in the future, he would pass all compositional duties over to other members in order to concentrate on running the band. From a business perspective, this worked well, as Earthworks were now finally making money on tour and were the only British jazz quartet to regularly tour the United States. This was reflected by the year's successful sixteen-date tour across America, during which the band made live recordings for future release. In the autumn, the band made a "disappointing" appearance at the Cork Jazz Festival.

==== Tim Garland replaces Patrick Clahar (late 2001) ====
At the end of 2001, the band went through another lineup change when Patrick Clahar was asked to leave the band. This was to enable Bruford to replace him with Tim Garland, a British saxophonist and composer who’d become a valued sideman for Chick Corea, and who Bruford thought would help to revive Earthworks’ creative fortunes. Clahar's time with the band would be further represented on 2002's double live album, Footloose and Fancy Free, recorded at London's Pizza Express in 2001, and on the companion DVD, Footloose in NYC, recorded at the Bottom Line, New York City during the 2000 American tour.

==== First years with Garland; Random Acts of Happiness (2002–mid-2004) ====
Revitalised by Garland's arrival, Earthworks played a series of gigs in Germany and Japan, followed by more American dates on the East Coast and in the Mid-West plus (back in the UK) a concert date with former Police drummer Stewart Copeland. In September the band toured South America, visiting four countries in five days. Despite these efforts and successes, the band was beginning to suffer as concert opportunities diminished. An exception was a UK tour in the spring of 2003, which enabled the band to practise new Tim Garland-composed material and culminated in a headlining season at Ronnie Scott's Jazz Club in London. In the autumn, a new live album was recorded in Oakland, California. This would be released in March 2004 as Random Acts of Happiness.

Also in 2004, Bruford ended his business relationship with Discipline Global Mobile and set up two small interrelated record labels of his own, Summerfold and Winterfold. The former of these was to become Earthworks’ home for both new and archive releases (including the brand new Random Acts of Happiness).

==== Gwilym Simcock replaces Steve Hamilton; more changes including work with The Underground Orchestra (2004) ====
In April 2004 Steve Hamilton was replaced as Earthworks pianist by Gwilym Simcock, an outstanding young musician who was already being widely talked about and who now needed to build the foundations of a career. At around this time, Bruford was losing patience with the economic and bureaucratic nature of a transatlantic music career, which constantly created obstacles with visas and musicians' union demands. Although he would use his regular musicians when he could (including for studio recording dates), future Earthworks performances in the United States would use local musicians as and when required.

Earthworks toured the UK between April and July 2004, during which period the band teamed up with the Tim Garland-led nonet The Underground Orchestra for several dates. The combined band took the name of the Earthworks Underground Orchestra. A New York version of the band was recorded in concert and the results were eventually released in 2006 as the album Earthworks Underground Orchestra (credited to Bruford/Garland).

==== Last working years (2005–2007) ====
During 2005, Bruford mostly sidelined Earthworks to concentrate on running the increasing reissue programme on Summerfold and Winterfold. Bruford performed with various versions of the band for occasional concerts around the world, and more Earthworks recordings were made with a lineup of Bruford, Garland, Simcock and bass guitarist Laurence Cottle (who had replaced Hodgson). However, Bruford has subsequently confessed to having been uncertain about Earthworks’ artistic future during this particular year.

In 2006, the band travelled to Southeast Asia, during which time Bruford noticed that drum clinic appearances now appeared to be more popular than live band shows. Nonetheless, more concerts followed in Spain, Poland, and Scandinavia. Bruford was also determined to take the full British version of Earthworks to New York regardless of the financial risk. He did so in November 2006, balancing the budget with the money he was now getting from clinic work and solo appearances. There were no Earthworks gigs in 2007, although Summerfold released two Video Anthology DVDs.

==== Final split (2008) ====
In the summer of 2008, Earthworks played a concert at Ronnie Scott's in London, which proved to be the band's final appearance. Following twenty-two years of effort, Bruford had concluded that music business economics and the relationship of work to reward (and even to the practical business of survival) would no longer support either the band or himself. Although the reissue programme on Summerfold continued, Earthworks as an ongoing project was finally and formally closed down on 1 January 2009 (along with all of Bruford's other live and studio projects) when the drummer announced his retirement from playing music at anything other than a teaching level. Cottle returned to various sessions and sideman work, Garland to his other projects, and Simcock (who was now attracting a great deal of critical and music industry attention) to a burgeoning cross-disciplinary career in both jazz and classical music.

== Album covers ==
All of Earthworks’ album covers were created by illustrator and designer Dave McKean. McKean is also a jazz pianist, having worked with former Earthworks saxophonist Iain Ballamy on a number of musical projects.

== Members ==
=== Full band members ===
- Bill Bruford - acoustic and electronic drums, percussion (1986–2008)
- Iain Ballamy - saxophones (1986–1993)
- Django Bates - piano, keyboards, tenor horn, trumpet, pocket trumpet (1986–1993)
- Mick Hutton - double bass (1986–1988)
- Tim Harries - double bass, bass guitar (1988–1993)
- Steve Hamilton - piano, keyboards (1997–2004)
- Patrick Clahar - saxophones (1997–2001)
- Geoff Gascoigne - double bass (1997–1998)
- Mark Hodgson - double bass (1998–2005)
- Gwilym Simcock - piano, keyboards (2004–2008)
- Tim Garland - saxophones, clarinet, bass clarinet, flute (2001–2008)
- Laurence Cottle - bass guitar (2005–2008)

=== Guests ===
- Dave Stewart - synthesizers & synth bass (1986 - studio only)
- Julian Argüelles - saxophone (occasional depping)
- Larry Coryell - guitar (2000 - tour only)
- Various American musicians (2004–2006 - American live dates only)

== Discography ==
=== Studio albums ===
- Earthworks (1987)
- Dig? (1989)
- All Heaven Broke Loose (1991)
- A Part, and Yet Apart (1999)
- The Sound of Surprise (2001)
- From Concept to Birth (from 2019 box set, 17 short tracks showing the process from demo to master)

=== Live albums (CD and DVD) ===
- Stamping Ground: live in 1992, various venues (1994)
- Footloose and Fancy-Free live at PizzaExpress Jazz Club, London, June 2001 (2002)
- Footloose in NYC (DVD) live at the Bottom Line NYC, May 2001 (2019 box set version adds 2CD audio set) (2002)
- Random Acts of Happiness live at Yoshi's, Oakland CA, May 2003 (2004) (featuring Tim Garland)
- Earthworks in Santiago, Chile September 2002 (2019 box set version includes 1CD, 1DVD)
- Live at the Schauburg Bremen 1987 (2022)

=== Compilation albums ===
- Heavenly Bodies (compilation) (1997) (2019 box set includes expanded 2CD edition)
- Video Anthology Vol. 1 2000's (2019 box set includes live 2CD) (2007)
- Video Anthology Vol. 2 1990's (2019 box set includes live 2CD) (2007)
- Earthworks Complete (2019 box set 20 cd, 15 titles on 20CD, 4DVD)

=== Collaboration albums ===
- Earthworks Underground Orchestra (as Bruford/Garland) (2006)
