= Paul Edmonds =

British musician

- Born: March 27, 1968 (age 58)
- Genre: Jazz
- Occupations: Musician, composer, teacher,
- Instruments: Trumpet, Piano
- Years active: 1984–present
- Label: Prince of Peace Records
- Website: http://www.journeyoftheheart.co.uk

Paul Richard Edmonds (born 1968) is a British jazz trumpeter and piano player, composer and teacher. He was a member of the National Youth Jazz Orchestra, Mike Westbrook Orchestra and Loose Tubes and performed at Ronnie Scott's Jazz Club both as a leader and sideman.

== Early career ==
Born in Essex in 1968, Paul Edmonds moved to the south coast of England in 1977, at the age of 9. The same year he started to learn to play the trumpet and by the time he was 16 he was performing publicly with local groups. When he was 17 he joined the National Youth Jazz Orchestra and the following year won First Prize in the International Trumpet Guild's Jazz Improvisation Competition, the final of which was held at Ronnie Scott's Jazz Club in London. He then studied at the Guildhall School of Music and graduated in 1989.

His early professional career was spent on the London jazz scene, playing with musicians including Jean Toussaint, Julian Arguelles, Iain Ballamy, Cleveland Watkiss, Julian Joseph, Jason Rebello, Simon Purcell, Clark Tracey and Alec Dankworth. He was also a member of the ground-breaking Loose Tubes collective. With Loose Tubes he played at venues throughout Britain and Europe between 1988 and 1990. In 1989 the former Art Blakey tenor man, Jean Toussaint, asked him to join his band and the same year the band appeared at Ronnie Scott's Jazz Club. The following year he appeared again at the club, this time under his own name, and later in the year played a two-week stint with "Loose Tubes", the last appearance the band made before its break up. In 1991 he travelled in Europe and Australia where he led his own group in Sydney, before returning to London in 1992. In 1993 he formed a new group and started performing his own music for the first time, much of which was inspired by his travels. He performed again at Ronnie Scott's, as well as the 606 Club, the Vortex and other prestigious clubs in London. In 1995 he joined the Mike Westbrook Orchestra, playing at British Jazz Festivals and touring in Europe, and in 1996 he was a featured soloist on Westbrook's "Bar Utopia" album. In 1997 he helped form "Sound Arts", a community based youth music project in North Kensington. At the heart of the project was a recording studio in which he learnt many of the skills he would later use to record his own music. In 1999 he formed a new Quintet, with performances at the 606 Club, a monthly residency at Lauderdale House, a standing ovation at the Tabernacle and a week at Ronnie Scott's again in January 2000. He then turned his hand to the piano, an instrument he had played since he was 13 but had hitherto used only as a compositional tool. He formed a Quartet in which he played the piano and synthesizer on his own compositions and the trumpet on well known jazz standards. The group also featured Colin Oxley on guitar. The band's residency continued at Lauderdale House where they began recording their performances and this culminated in the album, "Lilyfield", in 2001.

== Current Work ==
Since 2003 he has focused on composing, recording and teaching. As a composer he has created a suite of albums which include many of his original compositions documenting his life experiences. These recordings include live performances and have been released on the Prince of Peace label. Recently he has been recording music in which he multi-tracks a range of instruments, all of which he plays himself.

== Discography ==
=== As Leader ===
- 'Journey Of The Heart' (1993)
- 'Lilyfield' (2001)
- 'Lost In Time' (2002)
- 'That's All' (2003)
- 'Journey's End' (2006)
- 'Laura Jane' (2009)
- 'Triumph Of The Spirit' (2015)
- 'Nature Boy' (2020)

=== As Sideman ===
With National Youth Jazz Orchestra

- 'Maltese Cross' (1988)

With Cleveland Watkiss

- 'Green Chimneys' (1989)

With Loose Tubes

- 'Dancing on Frith Street' (Live at Ronnie Scott's 1990)
- 'Säd Afrika' (Live at Ronnie Scott's 1990)
- 'Arriving' (Live at Ronnie Scott's 1990)

With Mike Westbrook

- Bar Utopia (1996)

With Others

- 'One Two Three' (1990) with Nick Purnell
- 'Ballads' (1997) with Ken Stubbs
- 'When We Were Five' (2011) with Charlene Soraia
