= Cantilena (album) =

Studio album by First House
- Released: 1989
- Recorded: March, 1989, Rainbow Studios Oslo
- Genre: Jazz
- Length: 37:16
- Label: ECM
- Producer: Manfred Eicher

First House chronology
Eréndira (album) (1985)	Cantilena (1989)

Professional ratings
Review scores
Source	Rating
Allmusic	4.5/5 stars
The Penguin Guide to Jazz Recordings	3/4 stars

Cantilena is the second album recorded by the British jazz quartet, First House. It was released by ECM. The album presents a studio performance of leader and saxophonist Ken Stubbs with Django Bates on piano, Mick Hutton on bass and Martin France on drums, recorded over 2 days in March, 1989 in Norway.

== Reception ==
Jazz commentator Richard Lehnert states "Well my first – and second and third-impressions of First House's cool, sculpted, heady music are of sustained fires of excitement, intelligence, and clarity. Live long and prosper, guys – you've charted another great, serious jazz album."

Master saxophonist, David Liebman comments on how... "his (Stubbs's) playing is remarkably cliche free" and also states, "It is so refreshing to hear young musicians going for a group sound as their major goal.

In Billboard Magazine, Jeff Levenson cites Ken Stubbs and Django Bates as examples of how "Great Britain's young turks have adopted him (John Coltrane) as a spiritual forebear.

High Fidelity Magazine stated that, "The future of British jazz is in good hands with this acoustic quartet. The follow-up to the well-received 'Eréndira', 'Cantilena' is a relaxed, free form set with classy performances all round but some particularly fine playing from Ken Stubbs on alto sax."

== Track listing ==
1. "Cantilena" Ken Stubbs – 3:28
2. "Underfelt" Django Bates – 4:52
3. "Dimple" Django Bates – 3:51
4. "Sweet Williams" Django Bates – 5:05
5. "Low Down (Toytown)" Ken Stubbs – 3:28
6. "Hollyhocks" Django Bates – 3:23
7. "Madeleine After Prayer" Eddie Parker – 1:47
8. "Shining Brightly" Ken Stubbs – 4:12
9. "Jay-Tee" Django Bates – 3:55
10. "Pablo" Ken Stubbs – 3:15

== Personnel ==
- Ken Stubbs – alto and soprano saxophones
- Django Bates – piano, tenor horn
- Mick Hutton – double bass
- Martin France – percussion
- Manfred Eicher – producer
- Jan Erik Konshaug – engineer
- Dieter Rehm – design
