= All Men Amen =

Studio album by Iain Ballamy
- Released: 19 September 1995
- Recorded: 31 March – 3 April 1993
- Genre: Jazz
- Length: 43:50
- Label: B&W Music
- Producer: Peter Schulze

Iain Ballamy chronology
Balloon Man (1988)	All Men Amen (1995)	Acme (1995)

Professional ratings
Review scores
Source	Rating
Allmusic	4.5/5 stars

All Men Amen is the second album by English saxophonist Iain Ballamy, featuring Django Bates, Steve Watts and Martin France. It was released on the B&W label in 1995.

== Reception ==
Allmusic awarded the album with 4.5 out of 5 stars.

== Track listing ==
1. "All Men Amen" – 7:24
2. "Serendipity" – 5:28
3. "Blennie" – 4:42
4. "Haunted Swing" – 4:30
5. "Oaxaca" – 6:07
6. "Meadow" – 8:48
7. "This World...." – 4:36
8. "Further Away" – 3:35

All compositions by Iain Ballamy

== Personnel ==
- Iain Ballamy – soprano, alto and tenor saxophones
- Django Bates – keyboards, tenor horn
- Steve Watts – bass
- Martin France – drums
