= First House (band) =

British jazz quartet

Background information
- Origin: London, UK
- Genres: modern jazz, jazz fusion
- Years active: 1983–1990
- Labels: ECM Records,
- Past members: Ken Stubbs, Django Bates, Mick Hutton, Martin France

First House was a British jazz quartet that was active between 1983 and 1990. Founded and led by saxophonist and composer Ken Stubbs, the group also consisted of Django Bates on piano (and composer), Mick Hutton on acoustic bass and Martin France on drum kit and percussion.

== History ==
After receiving an Arts Council of Great Britain Jazz Bursary Award in 1983, Ken Stubbs formed this London based quartet – with the intention of recording an album on his own label. After encouragement and advice from jazz pianist John Taylor, the group were fortunate to become acquainted with saxophonist and improviser Evan Parker who in 1984 agreed to informally co-produce the recording. The project was halted as a result of Evan Parker contacting ECM Records founder and producer, Manfred Eicher.

In July 1985 First House toured Norway and played at the Molde International Jazz Festival. During the visit they recorded their first album for ECM Records at Rainbow Studios in Oslo. This was released in 1986 as 'Eréndira', achieving high critical praise internationally.

In 1984 First House were also the winners of the Third International Jazz Federation European Jazz Competition at Leverkusen, Germany. They were awarded the title, "European Young Jazz Artists 1984"

Between 1984 and 1989 they performed throughout Europe, including British Council funded tours of Finland and Poland, with successful performances at the Warsaw Jazz Jamboree and the Helsinki Jazz Festival.

In 1986 they were invited to tour South America by the British Council performing in Venezuela, Columbia, Peru, Ecuador and Chile, gaining highly successful reviews. Between 1986 and 1989 they performed throughout the UK, including 2 performances at Ronnie Scott's Club and recorded several performances for the BBC Radio 3 Jazz Today and Jazz in Britain programmes.

The quartet finally disbanded in 1989 after recording their second album release from ECM Records, 'Cantilena' which was released in 1990, again receiving critical acclaim internationally.

During this same period, all of the members of First House played permanently or occasionally with British jazz ensemble, Loose Tubes. Django Bates, Ken Stubbs and Martin France all performed on the last 3 albums that Loose Tubes released – 'Dancing on Frith Street' (2010), 'Säd Afrika' (2012) and 'Arriving' (2015).

Between 1986 and 1988, Mick Hutton and Django Bates were members of Bill Bruford's band, Earthworks. They also played with co-Earthworks member, saxophonist Iain Ballamy in, 'The Iains", with drummer, Steve Arguelles.

== Post First House ==
Since its disbandment, all of the members of First House have pursued individual careers within the UK and the international jazz scene.

Django Bates and Martin France have played in various ensembles together, including Human Chain, and also with groups led by Iain Ballamy and Julian Arguelles.

In 2004 Ken Stubbs was one of the 60 composers invited to create one bar of music for the composition, 'Premature Celebration' by Django Bates – written for Evan Parker and the London Sinfonietta, to celebrate Evan's 60th birthday. It was performed at the FuseLeeds Festival and broadcast by BBC Radio 3.

== First House Discography ==
- Eréndira – ECM – 1986
- Cantilena – ECM – 1990
- 1984 – Unreleased
