= If Summer Had Its Ghosts =

Studio album by Bill Bruford with Ralph Towner and Eddie Gómez
- Released: 1997
- Recorded: February 1997
- Studio: Make Believe Ballroom, West Shokan, New York
- Genre: Jazz
- Length: 49:06
- Label: Discipline Global Mobile; DGM9705
- Producer: Bill Bruford

If Summer Had Its Ghosts is an album by drummer Bill Bruford on which he is joined by guitarist Ralph Towner and bassist Eddie Gómez. It was recorded in West Shokan, New York, in February 1997, and was released later that year by Discipline Global Mobile.

The album came about when Bruford approached Towner and Gómez, stating that he would like to make a record that would serve as a vehicle for his compositions, but that would also include pieces by all involved. In an interview, Bruford stated that he was pleased with the album's intimacy, calling it "anti-testosterone," and suggesting the influence of Paul Motian's "delicate side." Bruford reflected: "In my mind, the record is effortless, intricate and subtle... there's nowhere to hide. It's completely scary—you just touch something, and that's that... I really like this musical watercolor painting thing with these guys." After the session, Bruford called Gómez "the greatest musician he ever worked with."

== Reception ==
Professional ratings
Review scores
Source	Rating
AllMusic	4/5 stars
The Penguin Guide to Jazz	3.5/4 stars

In a review for AllMusic, Michael G. Nastos wrote: "If summer really does have its ghosts, they would evoke echoes of spring, full of renewal, hope, and joyful anticipation. It is that spirit with which this music is made, and it is some of greatest music, collectively or otherwise, that these three have conjured in their lengthy, storied careers."

The authors of The Penguin Guide to Jazz Recordings stated: "the chemistry here is exquisite... Gómez is masterful and there are signs that his sound made some impact on Bruford's thinking about small groups over the next period."

Jeff Melton, writing for Exposé Online, commented: "Melody lines are indistinct between improv and composition which is the stamp of a healthy creative dialog between listening contributors... Bruford uses many subtle facets of his percussive palette throughout the disc. However, he continues to deliver through his on-going compositional education... if you like sophisticated jazz, then you'll be pleased by the nuances and spirited interplay."

A reviewer for Jazz Shelf remarked: "Ralph and Eddie mainly focus on bringing Bill's compositions alive, and the album rises or falls on the strength of each tune... What's good is very good, and the title track is perhaps the best theme Bruford has ever written."

Yoga Journal's Richard Price called the album "exceptional," and wrote: "the often rapid pieces are sometimes abstract, but the intricate interplay is exquisite and the trio never loses touch with the melodic thread."

== Track listing ==
1. "If Summer Had Its Ghosts" (Bill Bruford) – 6:20
2. "Never the Same Way Once" (Bill Bruford) – 5:04
3. "Forgiveness" (Bill Bruford, Django Bates, Iain Ballamy) – 5:15
4. "Somersaults" (Bill Bruford) – 3:27
5. "Thistledown" (Bill Bruford) – 4:11
6. "The Ballad of Vilcabamba" (Bill Bruford) – 5:00
7. "Amethyst (for Carmen)" (Eddie Gómez) – 4:18
8. "Splendour Among Shadows" (Bill Bruford) – 4:52
9. "Some Other Time" (Bill Bruford, Joe Morello) – 3:01
10. "Silent Pool" (Bill Bruford) – 3:35
11. "Now is the Next Time" (Ralph Towner) – 4:03

== Personnel ==
- Bill Bruford – drums, percussion
- Ralph Towner – twelve-string guitar, classical guitar, piano, keyboards
- Eddie Gómez – bass
