= First House =

First House may refer to:

- First House (band), a British jazz ensemble
- First House (company), a Norwegian company
- First Houses, a public housing project in Manhattan in New York City
- First house, an angular house in astrology
