= Dominic Alldis =

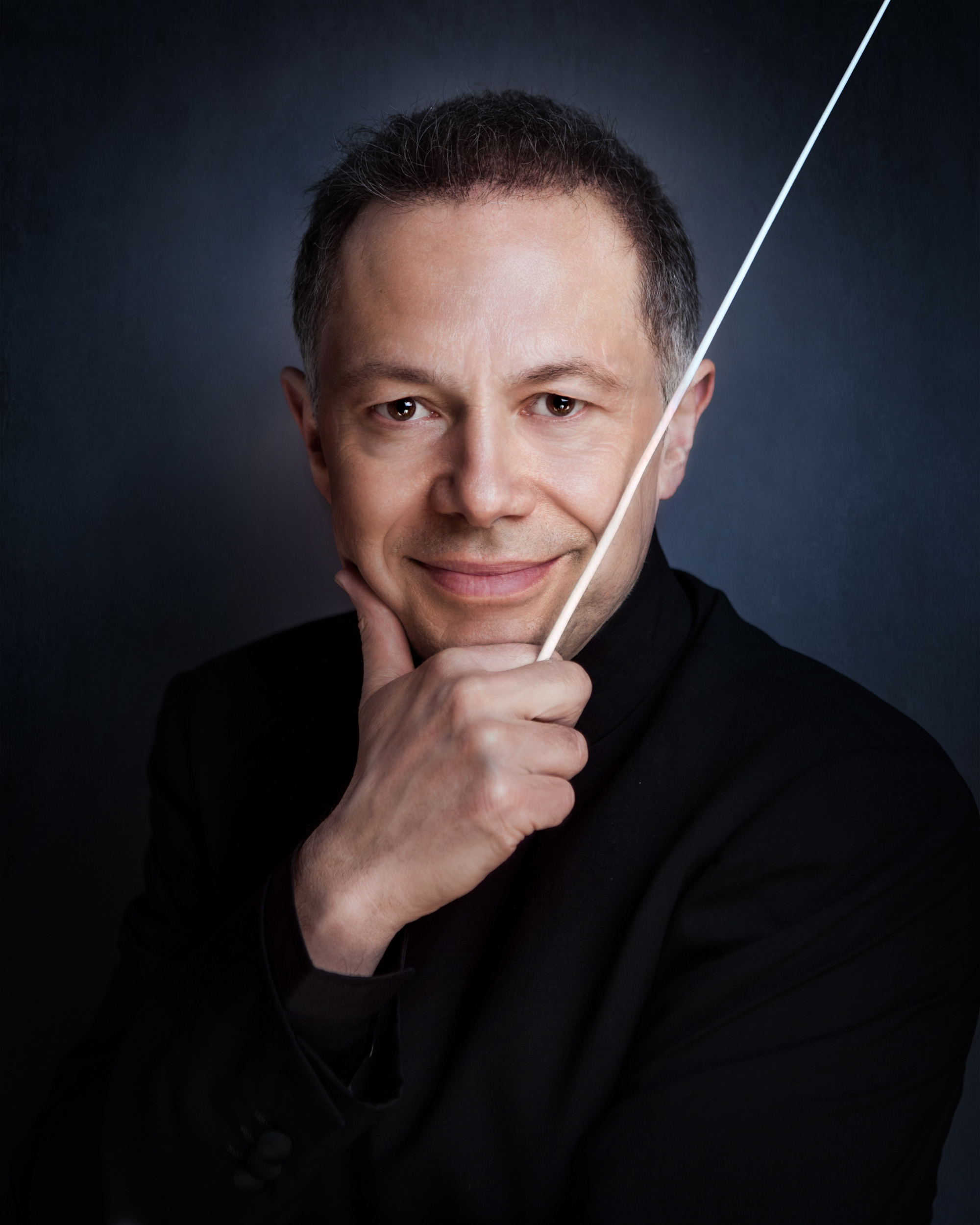
- Alldis in 2018

Background information
- Born: Dominic William Alldis; London, England
- Genres: Jazz, Classical
- Occupations: Musician, Business Speaker
- Instrument: Piano
- Years active: 1982–present
- Label: Canzona Music
- Website: dominicalldis.com

Dominic Alldis (born 1962) is a jazz pianist, orchestral conductor, and arranger. He is also a business speaker and founder of Music & Management.

== Early life ==
Alldis was born into a family of classical musicians. His mother was a violinist and his father was choral conductor John Alldis. He was exposed early to classical repertoire, studying classical cello, piano, and organ, then conducting and composition.

== Career ==
Alldis began his musical career in 1982 in Paris, studying jazz piano with Bernard Maury and Aaron Bridgers, while accompanying singers of French chanson and teaching at the American School of Modern Music. In 1984, he returned to the UK to become resident-pianist at the London jazz and cabaret venue, Pizza on the Park. During a two-year residency he played opposite many celebrated jazz and cabaret artists including Blossom Dearie, Dave Frishberg, Bob Dorough, Teddy Wilson, Dave McKenna and Roger Kellaway.

In 1987–89, Alldis studied composition with Konrad Boehmer and Frederic Rzewski at the Royal Conservatory of The Hague. In 1988 he was invited by the Studio for Electro-Instrumental Music in Amsterdam (STEIM) to develop a performance using live electronics and the Yamaha MIDI Grand Piano. He then toured Europe during 1989–91 giving concerts using the new instrument, culminating in the album Night Music for Lumina Records.

In 1996 he started the record label Canzona Music and recorded a series of vocal-jazz albums: Turn Out the Stars – the songs of Bill Evans, If Love Were All – the songs of Noël Coward and Watch What Happens – the songs of Michel Legrand. These albums feature the UK jazz musicians Claire Martin (vocals), Geoff Gascoyne (bass), Adam Glasser (harmonica), Tim Garland (saxophone), Alec Dankworth (bass), Clark Tracey (drums), Colin Oxley (guitar), Iain Ballamy (saxophone) and Martin France (drums) and classical quartets The Allegri Quartet and The Pavao Quartet. All albums on Canzona Music are distributed by State51.

In 2002 he formed an octet comprising four jazz soloists and a classical string quartet: Iain Ballamy (saxophone), Malcolm Creese (bass), Martin France (drums) and the Pavao Quartet. Together they undertook a UK tour sponsored by the Arts Council of England in a programme of Alldis's contemporary arrangements of themes from classic French films, such as A Man and a Woman, The Umbrellas of Cherbourg and Monsieur Hulot's Holiday, as well as songs by film composer Michel Legrand. Concert venues included the Wigmore Hall (London), the Adrian Boult Hall (Birmingham) and the Queen's Hall, Edinburgh. This led to a fourth album on the Canzona Music label: Themes from French Cinema. This was followed in 2008 by the release of Scenes We Once Knew, an album of works by jazz-singer pianists, and in 2009 Songs We Heard featuring contemporary arrangements of familiar childhood songs for jazz piano trio.

Alldis formed the Dominic Alldis Trio in 2009 with former Ronnie Scott's Quintet bassist Andrew Cleyndert and drummer Martin France. The trio brings a jazz approach to their repertoire, including classical themes from chamber music and opera, folk songs and childhood themes, as well as original compositions. Key influences include Bill Evans, Jacques Loussier, Jan Johansson, John Lewis and the Modern Jazz Quartet. The Trio's album, A Childhood Suite features improvisations on familiar childhood themes scored for piano trio and string orchestra.

In 2010 Alldis founded the Canzona Chamber Orchestra to perform classical repertoire and crossover projects with jazz musicians. Their inaugural concert was at St James's Church, Piccadilly, London on 22 April 2010, and featured Tchaikovsky's Serenade for Strings, Britten's Simple Symphony and the premiere of Alldis's Childhood Suite, scored for jazz piano trio and orchestra.

== Teaching and writing ==
Alldis has taught at music institutions in London, Dartington and Paris, and is on the staff at the Royal Academy of Music (RAM) in London, where he teaches improvisation to classical pianists and opera singers. In 2006, he led a jazz singing masterclass at the RAM. He wrote A Classical Approach to Jazz Piano Harmony and A Classical Approach to Jazz Piano Improvisation, both published by the Hal Leonard Corporation.

In 1998, he founded Music & Management, which offers corporate training and client appreciation events exploring the parallels between musical and business leadership. His events often involve a live symphony orchestra or jazz band, or a solo piano performance.

== Discography ==
- Night Music (Lumina Music, 1989)
- Turn Out the Stars: The Songs of Bill Evans (Canzona Music, 1996)
- IF Love Were All: The Songs of Noel Coward (Canzona, 2000)
- Watch What Happens: The Songs of Michel Legrand (Canzona, 2002)
- Themes from French Cinema (Canzona, 2004)
- Scenes We Once Knew (Canzona, 2008)
- Songs We Heard (Canzona, 2009)
- A Childhood Suite (Canzona, 2012)
- Praeludium: Jazz Improvisations on Classical Themes (Canzona, 2015)

== Bibliography ==
- A Classical Approach to Jazz Piano, Book One: Exploring Harmony (Hal Leonard Corporation)
- A Classical Approach to Jazz Piano, Book Two: Improvisation (Hal Leonard)
- Nursery Rhymes Jazz (Hal Leonard)
