= Balloon Man =

Balloon Man may refer to:

- "The Balloonman", an episode of the television series Gotham
- Balloon Man (album), a 1989 album by Iain Ballamy
- Balloon Man (DC Comics), a fictional character from DC Comics
