= Ballads (Ken Stubbs album) =

Studio album by Ken Stubbs
- Released: 2000
- Recorded: 1999, Sound Arts Studio, London
- Genre: Jazz
- Length: 64:32
- Label: Cherryk Records

Professional ratings
Review scores
Source	Rating
Jazzreview.com	5/5 stars

Ballads is the first solo studio album recorded by the British jazz saxophonist Ken Stubbs, released in 2000 by UK jazz label, Cherryk Records. The album features Ken Stubbs as leader and arranger. He plays alto saxophone throughout the recording and also plays the rarely heard basset horn on one arrangement. The album also features Gary Husband on drums, Mick Hutton on bass, Phil Robson on guitar and Paul Edmonds on piano. It was recorded during 1999 in Ladbroke Grove, London.

== Reception ==
The album gained very favourable reviews internationally. Jazz commentator Lee Prosser states, "Ken Stubbs plays a mellow, sensitive alto saxophone, and he is one of the finest playing today! This is a 5-Star CD. Everything about BALLADS is classic contemporary jazz at its best."

Chris Lee commented on how..."London based alto-saxist Stubbs is on ravishing, intimate form in quartet settings of familiar standards, bringing an almost Websterish sensuality to highly personal, full toned interpretations. His lyricism verges on the Ellingtonian."

In Allaboutjazz, Jim Santella states that..." Stubbs says it beautifully through his horn", while Peter Bevan calls it..."Mood music of the highest kind".

This was the last recording made by Ken Stubbs before he emigrated to Australia in 2001, where he is now active on the Australian Jazz scene.

== Track listing ==
1. Intro – "I Got It Bad and That Ain't Good" – 7:41
2. "Skylark" – Coda – 5:19
3. Intro – "You Are Too Beautiful" – Interlude/Coda – 7:12
4. Intro – "I Thought About You" – Coda – 7:18
5. Intro – "Prelude in Bb"** – 3:29
6. Intro – "Someone to Watch Over Me" – Interlude – 7:44
7. Intro – "You Don't Know What Love Is" – Interlude/Coda – 7:44
8. Intro – "Over the Rainbow" – Interlude/Coda – 4:29
9. Intro – "But Beautiful" – Interlude/Coda – 7:33
10. "That's All" – Coda – 7:33

== Personnel ==
- Ken Stubbs – alto saxophone and basset horn**
- Paul Edmonds – piano
- Mick Hutton – double bass
- Gary Husband – percussion
- Phil Robson – guitar

== Sources ==
- Prosser, Lee (8 February 2001). "BALLADS BY KEN STUBBS QUARTET". Jazz Review. Archived from the original on 18 December 2012.
- Santella, Jim (1 January 2001). "Ken Stubbs: Ballads". All About Jazz.
