= Mick Hutton =

British jazz bassist and composer (born 1956)

- Born: 5 June 1956 (age 69); Chester, UK
- Genres: Jazz
- Occupations: Musician, composer
- Instruments: Double bass, bass guitar, steel pans and cuarto
- Labels: ECM

Mick Hutton (born 5 June 1956 in Chester, UK) is a British jazz bassist and composer.

== Career ==
Classically trained on the piano, Hutton taught himself to play the bass, developing his own technique using three basic positions with the left hand coupled with three fingers on the right hand. He has been well known on the British jazz scene since 1980 and has toured extensively in Europe, Scandinavia, USA and Japan. He has recorded more than 100 jazz CDs and also worked in film and television, recording several hundred radio broadcasts in Europe and the USA.

He has recorded with Julian Argüelles, Iain Ballamy, Django Bates and Ken Stubbs (First House), the Chris Biscoe Sextet and Bill Bruford's Band Earthworks. In addition, Hutton worked throughout his career with Alan Barnes, Peter Erskine, Tina May, Jim Mullen, John Scofield, Alan Skidmore, Tommy Smith, John Taylor, Stan Tracey, and Kenny Wheeler. In 2002, he played on Robin Williamson's album Skirting the River Road, and the same year he played in a trio with Martin Speake and Paul Motian (Change of Heart).

In the 1990s, in addition to leading his own band, Hutton started working with Steve Argüelles, Kenny Wheeler, John Taylor, John Surman, Gary Husband and numerous American artists, including John Scofield, Bob Berg and Randy Brecker.

Hutton had a thirty-year association with Trinidadian pianist and steel pannist Russ Henderson MBE, one of the founders of the Notting Hill Carnival; Hutton wrote Henderson's obituary for The Independent newspaper on 8 September 2015. Hutton was a member of the Humphrey Lyttelton band for several years, during the course of which he also played with Acker Bilk, George Melly and Kenny Ball. Hutton has studied and recorded with various other instruments, such as steel pan and cuatro. Since 2004, he has had his own band, The Boat Rockers, featuring Paul Robinson, Gary Hammond and Andy Panayi. Most recently, Hutton recorded a film with Emeli Sande about Nina Simone for Sky Arts. Hutton is currently recuperating after a head injury that occurred at Christmas 2024.

== Selected discography ==
With Harry Beckett

- 1985: Pictures of You (Paladin)

With The Gordon Beck Quintet

- 1985: Celebration (JMS)

With First House

- 1986: Eréndira (ECM)
- 1989: Cantilena (ECM)

With The Chris Biscoe Sextet

- 1986: Eréndira (Walking Wig)

With Bill Bruford's Earthworks

- 1987: Earthworks (Edition)
- 1997: Heavenly Bodies (Venture)

With John Taylor Trio

- 1991: Blue Glass (Ronnie Scott's Jazz House)

With Tommy Smith

- 1991: Standards (Blue Note)

With Steve Argüelles

- 1991: Steve Argüelles (Ah Um)

With Nick Purnell

- 1991: Onetwothree (Ah Um)

With Lysis

- 1991: The Wings of the Whale – You Yangs (Soma)

With Stan Sulzman

- 1991: Feudal Rabbits (Ah Um)

With Estelle Kokot

- 1999: Alternative Therapy (Sayin' Somethin')

With Ken Stubbs

- 2000:Ballads (Cherry )

With Robin Williamson

- 2002: Skirting the River Road (ECM)

With Elkie Brooks & Humphrey Lyttelton

- 2002: Trouble in Mind (Slave to the Rhythm)

With Gary Husband

- 2004: Aspire (Jazzizit)

With Liam Noble Group

- 2004: In the Meantime (Basho)

With Martin Speake

- 2006: Change of Heart (ECM)

With Joanna Eden

- 2007: My Open Eye (Mr. Riddles)

With The Boat-Rockers

- 2007: Live at Appleby 2004 (Mick Hutton)

With Tim Garland

- 2015: Return to the Fire (Edition)

== Literature ==
- Richard Cook & Brian Morton: The Penguin Guide to Jazz Recordings, 8th Edition, London, Penguin, 2006, ISBN 0-141-02327-9.
