= Quiet Nights =

Quiet Nights may refer to:

- Quiet Nights (Diana Krall album), 2009
- Quiet Nights (Django Bates album), 1998
- Quiet Nights (Miles Davis and Gil Evans album), 1964

== See also ==
- Quiet Night (disambiguation)
- Corcovado (song), called "Quiet Nights of Quiet Stars" in English
