= Dig? =

Studio album by Bill Bruford's Earthworks
- Released: 15 June 1989
- Recorded: November and December 1988
- Genre: Jazz fusion
- Label: EG Records
- Producer: Adam Moseley, Bill Bruford

Bill Bruford's Earthworks chronology
Earthworks (1987)	Dig? (1989)	All Heaven Broke Loose (1991)

Dig? is the second album by Bill Bruford's Earthworks, featuring Django Bates, Iain Ballamy and fretless bass guitarist Tim Harries (replacing the acoustic bass guitarist Mick Hutton). It was released on EG Records in 1989.

== Reception ==
Professional ratings
Review scores
Source	Rating
AllMusic	3/5 stars
The Penguin Guide to Jazz	3/4 stars

AllMusic awarded the album 3 stars, and reviewer Robert Taylor called it "a solid effort," stating, "Never one to rest on his laurels, Bruford continued to search for different contexts in which to express his musical and percussive ideas."

The authors of The Penguin Guide to Jazz Recordings wrote: "On Dig? the highlight... isn't the fine original opener... but the arrangement of Tony Hatch's 'Downtown'.

Writing for All About Jazz, John Kelman commented: "Dig?... finds the group moving... into exploratory territory... Likely a result of the growing confidence that comes from having some history together, the group's interplay is even more vivid."

Jazz Journal's Mark Gilbert remarked: "Earthworks are going in the right direction, but next time I would suggest an embargo on anything over 35 key and tempo changes per minute."

== Track listing ==
1. "Stromboli Kicks" (Iain Ballamy, Django Bates, Bill Bruford) – 5:34
2. "Gentle Persuasion" (Ballamy, Bates) – 4:22
3. "Downtown" (Tony Hatch) – 5:50
4. "Pilgrim's Way" (Ballamy, Bruford) – 6:23
5. "Dancing on Frith Street" (Bates) – 4:19
6. "A Stone's Throw" (Ballamy, Bates, Bruford) – 6:06
7. "Libreville" (Ballamy, Bates, Bruford) – 6:10
8. "Coroboree" (Ballamy, Bruford) – 4:47

== Personnel ==
- Bill Bruford – acoustic and electronic drums, percussion
- Django Bates – keyboards, tenor horn, trumpet
- Iain Ballamy – soprano, alto and tenor and baritone saxophones
- Tim Harries – acoustic and fretless bass guitar
