= Steve Watts (musician) =

British jazz bassist (born 1961)

- Born: 14 September 1961 (age 64); Sutton, Surrey, England
- Genres: Jazz
- Occupation: Musician
- Instrument: Double Bass / Electric Bass
- Years active: 1980s–present

Steve Watts (born 14 September 1961) is a British jazz bass player who was a member of the Loose Tubes big band during the 1980s.

== Career ==
Steve Watts first came to prominence on the UK jazz scene as a bass player in bands with saxophonist Iain Ballamy. He later joined the UK big band Loose Tubes and features on recordings including the live album Arriving. Watts went on to collaborate with many UK jazz musicians including fellow Loose Tubes member Julian Arguelles, Billy Jenkins and Christine Tobin. He is a long time associate of US pianist Kirk Lightsey playing in duo, trio and quartet formats.

Watts is a founding member of The Printmakers, a British jazz band featuring Norma Winstone, Nikki Iles, Mark Lockheart, Mike Walker and James Maddren. In 2015 they released album Westerly which was well received, and The Observer noted that "Every one of them [...] is a leading figure in British contemporary jazz". In a 5-star review London Jazz News declared "there is surely no anchor more solid and creative, for a band with [sic] needs this freedom, than bassist Steve Watts."

Watts teaches on the Guildhall School of Music and Drama jazz instrumental staff and Trinity Laban Conservatoire of Music and Dance in London.

== Discography ==
With Loose Tubes

- Dancing on Frith Street (1989)
- Sad Africa (1989)
- Arriving (2015)

With Iain Ballamy

- Balloon Man (1988)
- All Men Amen (1995)

With Mike Walker

- Ropes (2018)

With Julian Arguelles

- Skull View (Babel, 1997)
- As Above So Below (Provocateur, 2003)
- Escapade (Provocateur, 1999)

With Christine Tobin

- Aliliu
- Yell of the Gazelle

With Billy Jenkins

- Suburbia (Babel, 1999)

With others

- Kenny Wheeler and Norma Winstone, Mirrors (2013)
- Nikki Iles and Norma Winstone, The Printmakers – Westerly (2015)
