= Eréndira (album) =

Studio album by First House
- Released: 1985
- Recorded: July, 1985, Rainbow Studios Oslo
- Genre: Jazz
- Length: 46:40
- Label: ECM
- Producer: Manfred Eicher

First House chronology
Eréndira (1985)	Cantilena (album) (1989)

Professional ratings
Review scores
Source	Rating
Allmusic	4/5 stars
The Penguin Guide to Jazz Recordings	3/4 stars

Eréndira is the first album recorded by the British jazz quartet, First House. It was released by ECM. The album presents a studio performance of leader and saxophonist Ken Stubbs with Django Bates on piano, Mick Hutton on bass and Martin France on drums, recorded over 2 days in July, 1985 in Norway.

== Reception ==
Jazz commentator Richard Lehnert states "Eréndira's bleak, lonely elegies for deserted cities show how fresh the basic acoustic jazz quartet can sound when approached with awesome chops a sympathetic producer, and most important, the willingness to keep listening to one another. I had the sense of musicians of impecable taste choosing just the right silences to fill, and doing so with infinite grace."

Commenting on Ken Stubbs, Richard Williams of The Times states that,"he seems to owe no aesthetic debt to any other saxophonist.

In Jazz Journal Magazine, Simon Adams states that, " Eréndira is a set that bears repeated listenings, for this is no usual quartet offering of solos and accompaniment but four highly individual musicians given plenty of space to flaunt their skills. The resulting music, with its subtle textures and fine use of space, produces an album of rare beauty."

Thom Durek reviewing the album on Allmusic.com, comments on Ken Stubbs. "As evidenced here, Ken Stubbs is, for a young man in his 20s, a brilliant composer. His works mark the majority of what is collected here. He understands dynamics, tension, texture, color, intervals, and most of all melody. His sense of these elements is complex but deeply satisfying. (Check the melody in "The Journeyers to the East.")"

== Track listing ==
1. "A Day Away" Ken Stubbs – 9:03
2. "Innocent Eréndira " Ken Stubbs – 2:54
3. "The Journeyers to the East" Ken Stubbs – 6:42
4. "Bracondale" Django Bates – 2:56
5. "Grammenos" Ken Stubbs – 11:19
6. "Stranger than Paradise" Ken Stubbs/Martin France – 2:21
7. "Bridge Call" Ken Stubbs – 9:16
8. "Doubt/Further Away" Django Bates – 2:33

== Personnel ==
- Ken Stubbs – alto and soprano saxophones
- Django Bates – piano
- Mick Hutton – double bass
- Martin France – percussion
- Manfred Eicher – producer
- Jan Erik Konshaug – engineer
- Barbara Wojirsch – graphic design
