= The Sound of Surprise =

Studio album by Bill Bruford's Earthworks
- Released: 27 February 2001
- Recorded: November 2000, Livingston Studios, London, England
- Genre: Jazz
- Label: Discipline Global Mobile

The Sound of Surprise is a studio album by Bill Bruford's Earthworks recorded November 2000. It was the second Earthworks album to feature saxophonist Patrick Clahar, pianist Steve Hamilton and acoustic bassist Mark Hodgson. Unlike previous Earthworks albums, it showcases a more traditional acoustic jazz quartet sound. It was released on Robert Fripp's Discipline Global Mobile label in 2001.

== Reception ==
Professional ratings
Review scores
Source	Rating
AllMusic	2.5/5 stars
The Penguin Guide to Jazz	3/4 stars

In a review for AllMusic, John Duffy wrote: " Precisely what made the early Earthworks records so interesting were the chordal drums, largely horn-driven songs, and more progressive outlook. Going back to a traditional jazz quartet format feels somehow like a step backward."

Writing for Jazz Times, Steve Smith stated: "With each of his successive side projects, [Bruford]'s edged closer to the trappings of mainstream jazz, stripping away the electronics and gimmicks until finally, on The Sound of Surprise, what's left is the very foundation of the tradition: a saxophone, a piano, a bass and a drum kit." He concluded by calling the album "far and away Bruford's most convincing jazz work to date."

David Cisco of Progressive World called the album "a treasure of complex musical arrangements and exciting musicianship," and commented: "The Sound of Surprise showcases the master timekeeper's vision and songwriting and production skills while sharing the spotlight with his highly talented bandmates. Almost every type of jazz is represented... The Sound of Surprise is indeed a surprise and a very happy one, to boot."

== Track listing ==
1. "Revel Without a Pause"
2. "Triplicity"
3. "The Shadow of a Doubt"
4. "Teaching Vera to Dance"
5. "Half Life"
6. "Come to Dust"
7. "Cloud Cuckoo Land"
8. "Never the Same Way Once"
9. "The Wooden Man Sings, and the Stone Woman Dances"
10. "Sound of Surprise"

== Personnel ==
- Bill Bruford - drums
- Patrick Clahar - tenor and soprano saxophones
- Steve Hamilton - piano
- Mark Hodgson - bass
