= All Heaven Broke Loose =

Studio album by Bill Bruford's Earthworks
- Released: 16 September 1991
- Recorded: January and February 1991
- Genre: Jazz fusion
- Label: EG Records
- Producer: David Torn, Bill Bruford

Bill Bruford's Earthworks chronology
Dig? (1989)	All Heaven Broke Loose (1991)	Stamping Ground (1994)

All Heaven Broke Loose is the third album by Bill Bruford's Earthworks, featuring Django Bates, Iain Ballamy and Tim Harries. It was released on EG Records in 1991. It was co-produced by experimental guitarist David Torn, with whom Bruford had played extensively in the 1980s (and would go on to do again in Bruford Levin Upper Extremities in 1998-2000.

== Reception ==
Professional ratings
Review scores
Source	Rating
AllMusic	4.5/5 stars
Entertainment Weekly	A
The Penguin Guide to Jazz	3.5/4 stars

AllMusic awarded the album with 4.5 stars and its review by Scott Yanow states: "Full of unpredictability, subtle mood changes, touches of eccentric funk and a surprisingly creative use of electronic rhythms here and there, Bruford's band plays intense but sometimes melancholy and introspective music. Recommended".

The authors of The Penguin Guide to Jazz Recordings called Bates' contribution to "Candles Still Flicker in Romania's Dark" "exceptional by any standard."

Josef Woodard of Entertainment Weekly called the album "evocative," and wrote: "Earthworks play up their jazz associations, but the lack of either traditional song structures or extended solos suggests a careful balance of tradition and mischief... Heard from start to finish, the album tells an engaging, abstract story, steeped in the spirit of jazz — if not the letter."

Writing for All About Jazz, John Kelman commented: "All Heaven Broke Loose is arguably Earthworks Mark I's most fully-realized studio release, even as it moves towards a more abstract aesthetic. Still, despite its off-kilter approach to tunes that avoid conventional form, Bruford's intrinsic time sense keeps things grounded throughout."

A reviewer for Jazz Journal remarked: "the integrative aspect of the four men is remarkable and it is frequently difficult to be clear about which of them is playing what. No matter. There is some richly rewarding music to enjoy – if you are prepared to be open-minded about the boundaries of jazz. Perhaps there are none, anyway."

== Track listing ==
1. "Hotel Splendour" (Iain Ballamy, Django Bates, Bill Bruford) – 4:42
2. "Forget-Me-Not" (Ballamy, Bates) – 8:25
3. "Candles Still Flicker in Romania's Dark" (Bates) – 4:35
4. "Pigalle" (Bates, Bruford) – 6:32
5. "Temple of the Winds" (Ballamy, Bruford, Tim Harries) – 5:02
6. "Nerve" (Ballamy, Bates, Bruford) – 6:07
7. "Splashing Out" (Ballamy, Bates) – 5:25
8. "All Heaven Broke Loose:
  1. Psalm, 2. Old Song" (Ballamy, Bates, Bruford) – 9:20
  Additional tracks (from Summerfold CD reissue, remastered):
9. "Libreville" (Ballamy, Bates, Bruford) - 7:54
10. "Pilgrim's Way" (Ballamy, Bruford) - 8:01

== Personnel ==
- Bill Bruford – electronic, acoustic and chordal drums
- Django Bates – keyboards, E♭ peck horn, trumpet
- Iain Ballamy – saxophones
- Tim Harries – acoustic and electric bass
