= Quiet Nights (Django Bates album) =

Studio album by Django Bates
- Released: 1998
- Recorded: 1997
- Genre: Jazz
- Length: 37:16
- Label: Screwgun
- Producer: Andrew Murdock

Django Bates chronology
Like Life (1997)	Quiet Nights (1998)	You Live and Learn...(Apparently) (2004)

Professional ratings
Review scores
Source	Rating
Allmusic	4.5/5 stars
The Penguin Guide to Jazz Recordings	3.5/4 stars

Quiet Nights is an album by English multi-instrumentalist and composer, Django Bates. It was released on the Screwgun label in 1998.

== Reception ==
Allmusic awarded the album with 4.5 out of 5 stars and its review by Thom Jurek states: "Bates and his band have taken these old warhorses and made them magical again, brought out the starlight and glitter and tossed it about the melodies, stretched the harmonies into cloud shapes, and added enough atmosphere and dimension to make Gil Evans smile from heaven."

== Track listing ==
1. "Speak Low" (Ogden Nash, Kurt Weill) – 9:14
2. "Teach Me Tonight" (Sammy Cahn, Gene de Paul) – 3:15
3. "And the Mermaid Laughed" (Iain Ballamy, Django Bates) – 3:21
4. "Quiet Nights of Quiet Stars" (Antonio Carlos Jobim, Gene Lees) – 3:14
5. "Hi-Lili, Hi-Lo" (Helen Deutsch, Bronisław Kaper) – 4:06
6. "(In My) Solitude" (Eddie DeLange, Duke Ellington, Eddie DeLange) – 5:10
7. "Like Someone in Love" (Johnny Burke, Jimmy Van Heusen) – 3:43
8. "Is There Anyone Up There?" (Bates) – 6:10
9. "Over the Rainbow" (Harold Arlen, Yip Harburg) – 6:36

== Personnel ==
- Django Bates – keyboards, tenor horn, voices
- Iain Ballamy – saxophone, harmonica
- Josefine Cronholm – vocals, voices, Tibetan bells
- Mike Mondesir – bass
- Martin France – drums, percussion
