= Earthworks (album) =

Studio album by Bill Bruford's Earthworks
- Released: 16 March 1987
- Recorded: October 1986
- Studio: Terminal 24 Studios, London, England
- Genre: Jazz fusion
- Length: 43:55
- Label: EG
- Producer: Dave Stewart, Bill Bruford

Bill Bruford's Earthworks chronology
Earthworks (1987)	Dig? (1989)

Earthworks is the first album by Bill Bruford's Earthworks, a jazz fusion band led by drummer Bill Bruford with keyboardist and trumpeter Django Bates, saxophonist Iain Ballamy, and acoustic bassist Mick Hutton. It was released in 1987 on EG Records and reissued on Summerforld in 2005. The album was co-produced by Bruford's former bandmate Dave Stewart.

== Reception ==
Professional ratings
Review scores
Source	Rating
AllMusic	3.5/5 stars
The Penguin Guide to Jazz	3/4 stars
Moving the River	8/10 stars

At AllMusic, critic Chris Kelsey gave the album three-and-a-half stars out of five. He wrote, "The best thing about this band is its refreshing ingenuousness; they make intelligent, sophisticated instrumental pop music that doesn't pander in the least."

Writing for All About Jazz, John Kelman noted that "Bruford's attraction to the juncture of strict form and freer improvisation, took a giant leap forward with Earthworks," and commented that the group "was unquestionably an improvising band; more than just a soloist playing over a fixed rhythm section, Earthworks has always been a looser affair, as much about interplay as adhering to any compositional form."

A reviewer for Moving the River wrote: "Some musicians have a unique touch – you can identify them within a few notes. In Bill Bruford's case, his snare drum is his main audio imprint. But he also always had a highly-original composing style before his retirement in 2009, and both are very much in evidence on the excellent Earthworks album."

== Track listing ==
1. "Thud" (Iain Ballamy) – 4:10
2. "Making a Song and Dance" (Ballamy, Bill Bruford) – 5:52
3. "Up North" (Ballamy, Django Bates, Bruford) – 5:19
4. "Pressure" (Bruford) – 4:57
5. "My Heart Declares a Holiday" (Ballamy, Bates, Bruford) – 4:35
6. "Emotional Shirt" (Bates) – 4:45
7. "It Needn't End in Tears" (Ballamy) – 5:14
8. "The Shepherd Is Eternal" (Bates, Bruford) – 1:50
9. "Bridge of Inhibition" (Ballamy, Bates, Bruford) – 4:15

== Personnel ==
- Bill Bruford – drums, electronic drums, percussion, producer
- Iain Ballamy – alto, soprano, and tenor saxophones
- Django Bates – tenor horn, trumpet, keyboards
- Mick Hutton – bass
- Dave Stewart – keyboards, sampling, producer
