= Josefine Cronholm =

Swedish singer

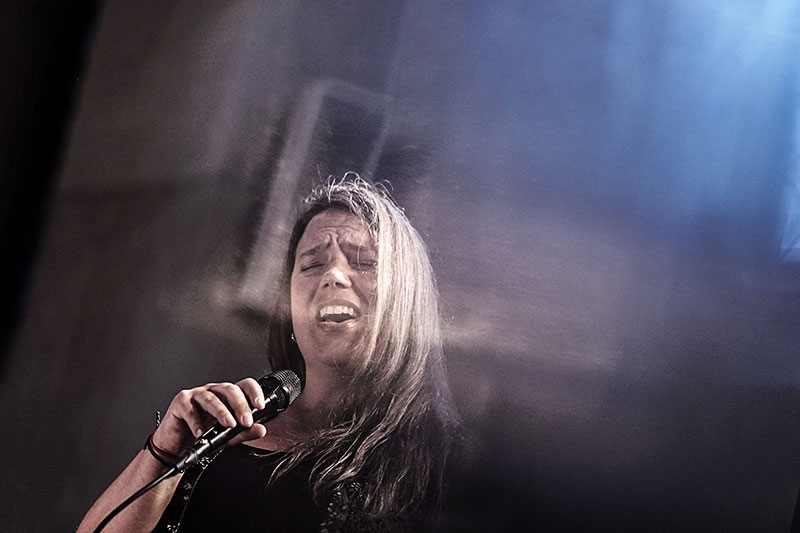
Josefine Cronholm at Copenhagen Jazz Festival 2018

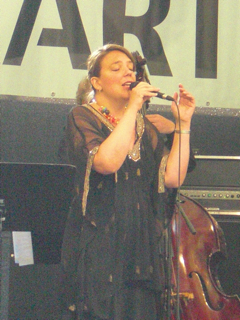
Josefine Cronholm in Germany, 2011

Josefine Cronholm (born 1971) is a Swedish jazz vocalist and a singer-songwriter, who has won two Danish Jazz Grammy Awards. She released her debut album, Wild Garden, in 2002. She sang on the Django Bates Album Quiet Nights in 1998. For the 2005 film MirrorMask, she covered The Carpenters' Close to You and wrote an original song called "If I Apologised."

== Discography ==
=== As leader ===
- 2001 Wild Garden (Stunt)
- 2003 Hotel Paradise (Stunt)
- 2010 Songs of the Falling Feather (ACT)
- 2018 Ember

=== As guest ===
With ARC

- 2013 Archipelago, Andersson/Russo/Cronholm (Gateway)

With Frans Bak

- 1999 Natsange (Stunt)
- 2007 Forbrydelsen (Universal)
- 2016 Sound of North (Universal)

With Django Bates

- 1999 Quiet Nights (Screwgun)

With Marilyn Mazur

- 2002 All the birds (Stunt)
- 2011 Celestial Circle, Mazur/Cronholm/Taylor/Jormin (ECM)
- 2014 Flamingo Sky, Mazur/Cronholm/Jonsson (Stunt)

With New Jungle Orchestra

- 1998 Giraf (Da Capo)
- 2000 Zig Zag Zimfoni (Stunt)
- 2004 Cheek to Cheek (Stunt)
- 2009 Live at Skuespillerhuset copenhagen (Steeplechase)

With Steen Rasmussen

- 2009 Amanha, I morron, Tomorrow (Calibrated)
- 2015 Presenca

With String Swing

- 2001 Red Shoes (Stunt)
- 2005 Blue Hat (Stunt)

With others

- 1997 Factum Est? (RM)
- 2001 Anker/Mazur/Crispell Poetic Justice (Da Capo)
- 2005 Mirromask
- 2006 Josefine Cronholm Easy jazz (Fønix)
- 2007 Josefine Cronholm Nordic Voices (ACT)
- 2017 Springet (film by Claus Bom, Music by Ida Bach Jensen)
