= Stamping Ground (album) =

Live album by Bill Bruford's Earthworks
- Released: 14 March 1994
- Recorded: 14 March 1992 and 22 May 1992 in New York & Boston (US) and Cambridge (UK)
- Genre: Jazz fusion
- Label: Summerfold Records
- Producer: Bill Bruford, Derek Drescher

Bill Bruford's Earthworks chronology
All Heaven Broke Loose (1991)	Stamping Ground (1994)	Heavenly Bodies (1997)

Stamping Ground is an album of 1992 live recordings at various venues by Bill Bruford's Earthworks, released on EG Records in 1994. It was the final Earthworks album to feature Django Bates, Iain Ballamy and Tim Harries. Four years later, Bruford would form a new version of Earthworks in a more traditional acoustic jazz vein.

Initially released on the Virgin Records' 'Venture' imprint in 1994, it was re-issued on Bruford's own Summerfold label in 2005, with a bonus 10th track, a 6:15 live version of "Hotel Splendour". However the 2019 Summerfold edition of Stamping Ground does not include the live "Hotel Splendour" nor is that version included anywhere in the 2019 Earthworks Complete box set.

== Reception ==
Professional ratings
Review scores
Source	Rating
AllMusic	4.5/5 stars
The Penguin Guide to Jazz	3/4 stars

The AllMusic review by Bill Meredith awards this album with 4.5 stars and states: "Bruford's chordal patterns sound practically symphonic amid his epic starts and stops — further proof of the originality of one of the most musical drummers of all-time. Like all great live releases, Stamping Ground makes you wish you had been there."

Writing for All About Jazz, John Kelman called the album "in some ways the most surprising record of Bruford's career to date," and noted that it "demonstrated what those fortunate enough to have caught the group in performance already knew—that despite Bruford's reputation for rigid structure in earlier projects within and outside his leadership, this was a group where every performance was, indeed, a new experience."

== Track listing ==
1. "Nerve" (Iain Ballamy) – 6:07
2. "Up North" (Ballamy, Bill Bruford) – 5:20
3. "A Stones Throw" (Ballamy, Django Bates, Bruford) – 8:26
4. "Pilgrim's Way" (Bruford) – 8:45
5. "Emotional Shirt" (Bates) – 6:01
6. "It Needn't End in Tears" (Ballamy) – 8:02
7. "All Heaven Broke Loose: I Psalm; II Old Song" (Ballamy, Bates, Bruford) – 7:46
8. "Candles Still Flicker in Romania's Dark" (Bates) – 6:41
9. "Bridge of Inhibition" (Ballamy, Bates, Bruford) – 10:58
10. "Hotel Splendour" (Ballamy, Bates, Bruford) – 6:15 – Bonus cut on 2005 edition only

== Personnel ==
- Bill Bruford – acoustic and electronic drums, percussion
- Tim Harries – acoustic and fretless bass
- Iain Ballamy – soprano, alto and tenor saxophones
- Django Bates – keyboards, tenor horn, trumpet
