= Julian Siegel =

British jazz musician (born 1966)

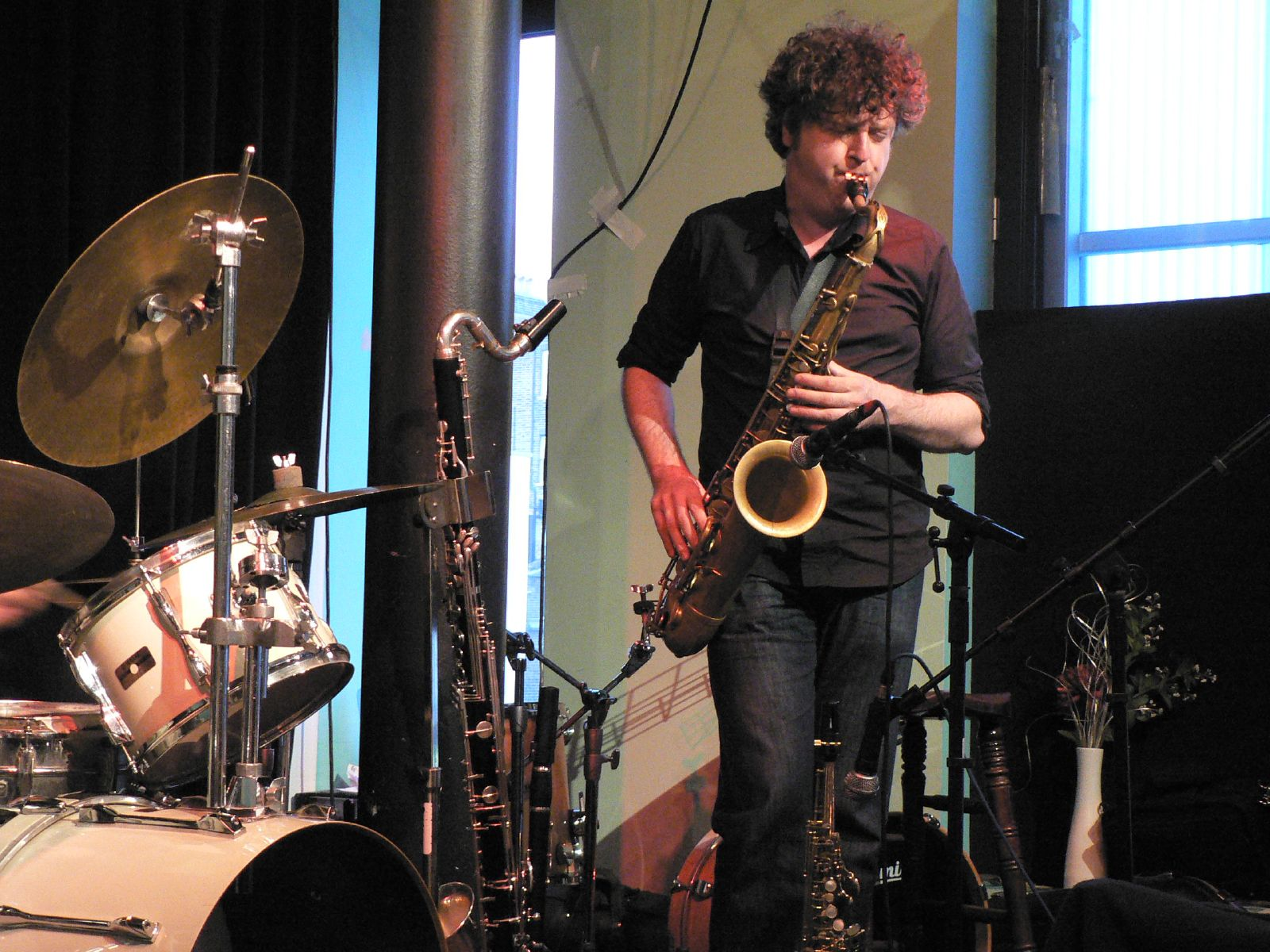
- Siegel in June 2007

Background information
- Born: 1966 (age 59–60); Nottingham, England
- Genres: Jazz
- Occupations: Instrumentalist, composer, arranger
- Instruments: Saxophone, clarinet
- Website: www.juliansiegel.com

Julian H. Siegel (born 1966) is a British jazz saxophone and clarinet player, and a composer and arranger, described by MOJO Magazine as "One of the UK's most creative saxophonists".

Siegel has toured and recorded with Greg Cohen and Joey Baron and was awarded the BBC Jazz Awards 2007 for Best Instrumentalist.

Siegel won the 2011 London Awards for Art and Performance Jazz. In 2015 won his quartet Partisans (Gene Calderazzo, Phil Robson, Thad Kelly) with the album Swamp the Parliamentary Jazz Awards Jazz Album of the Year.

== Discography ==
=== without fix groups ===
- Partisans (EFZ, 1997) with Phil Robson
- Close-Up (Sound Recordings, 2002)
- As One Does' (FMR Records, 2018) with Paul Dunmall, Percy Pursglove, Mark Sanders

=== with Partisans ===
- Sourpuss Babel BDV 2029 2000
- Max Babel BDV2553 2005
- By Proxy Babel BDV 2983 2009
- Swamp Whirlwind Recordings WR4657 2014
- Nit de Nit Whirlwind Recordings WR4738 2019

=== with Julian Siegel Quartet ===
- Urban Theme Park 2011 with Gene Calderazzo, Liam Noble, Oli Hayhurst
- Vista 2018 with Gene Calderazzo, Liam Noble, Oli Hayhurst
