= Christine Tobin =

Irish vocalist and composer (born 1963)

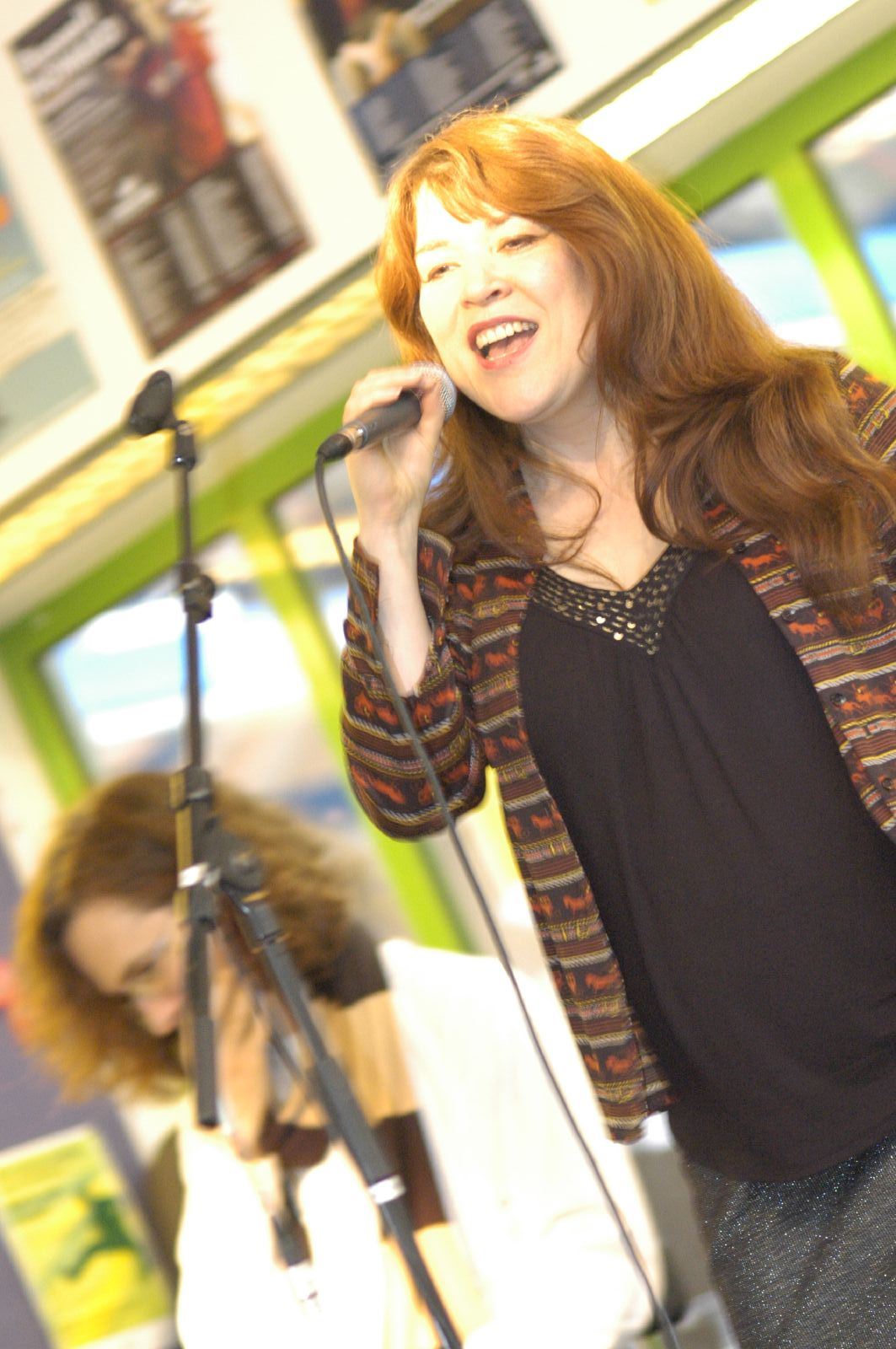

Background information
- Born: 7 January 1963 (age 63); Dublin, Ireland
- Genres: Jazz, folk
- Occupation: Singer
- Years active: 1995–present
- Labels: Traile Belle, Babel
- Formerly of: Lammas
- Website: www.christine-tobin.com

Christine Tobin (born 7 January 1963, Dublin, Ireland) is an Irish vocalist and composer from Dublin who has been part of the London jazz and improvising scene since the second half of the 1980s. She has been influenced by a diverse range of singers and writers including Betty Carter, Bessie Smith, Leonard Cohen, Olivier Messiaen, Miles Davis and poets William Butler Yeats, Paul Muldoon and Eva Salzman.

== Career ==
Tobin began singing in her early 20s. She discovered jazz through hearing the Joni Mitchell album Mingus, which led her to purchase the Charles Mingus album Mingus Ah Um and then other jazz albums. She moved to London in 1987 and sang in a band with Jean Toussaint, Jason Rebello, Alec Dankworth, and Mark Taylor before studying jazz at the Guildhall School of Music in 1988 and 1989. While at Guildhall, she formed a band with pianist Simon Purcell, double bassist Steve Watts, and drummer Phil Allen. Purcell encouraged Tobin to write lyrics for his tunes and set her on the path to writing her own material. She took a break from singing in 1990 to study anthropology at Goldsmiths College for two years.

For ten years, she sang with the band Lammas, led by saxophonist Tim Garland and guitarist Don Paterson. In 1993 she formed a band with pianist Huw Warren, bassist Steve Watts, and drummer Roy Dodds, recording the first two albums, Aliliu and Yell of the Gazelle, of seven on the Babel Label with them. She then met guitarist Phil Robson with whom she has formed a strong musical relationship. Her album sleeves are usually designed by Gee Vaucher and she has also worked with other members of Last Amendment including Penny Rimbaud.

During 2008, she toured England performing her album Secret Life of a Girl, her first since Romance and Revolution in 2004 and the seventh to be released on the Babel Label, with her band of pianist Liam Noble, cellist Kate Shortt, guitarist Phil Robson, bassist Dave Whitford, percussionist Thebe Lipere, and drummer Simon Lea.

In 2010 Tobin released the album Tapestry Unravelled, a duet with pianist Liam Noble. This is mostly the songs from Carole King's 1971 Tapestry album with one Tobin original. In 2012 Tobin, who with her partner Phil Robson is now spending much of her time in New York, won a BASCA British Composer Award for her settings of poems by WB Yeats, Sailing To Byzantium. She was also awarded a PRS commission to write new music. Pelt (2016), an album of her settings of poems and lyrics by contemporary Pulitzer Prize winning poet Paul Muldoon, is the completion of that commission.

== Awards and honors ==
- Best Vocalist, BBC Jazz Awards, 2008
- British Composer Award for Best Contemporary Jazz Composition BASCA, 2012
- Herald Angel Award for A Thousand Kisses Deep, 2013
- Jazz Vocalist of the Year, Parliamentary Jazz Awards, 2014

== Critical reception ==
In 2012 Tobin released Sailing to Byzantium, a critically acclaimed album of her settings of the poems of W.B. Yeats. Jazzwise magazine reviewed the album and said "Christine Tobin has created an unqualified masterpiece."

BBC Music magazine gave it a five-star review, and in a four-star review MOJO wrote, "Christine Tobin really transcends glib genre-fication. Her expressive range acknowledges finely acquired folk, jazz and 20th-century classical influences, which already sets her apart. And everything is shot through with an unmistakable refinement, free-spirited earthiness and giddy romanticism".

In 2014 Tobin released A Thousand Kisses Deep, an album of Leonard Cohen songs. The Irish Times said, "A lesser singer might be over-shadowed by the darkness of Cohen's words. But Tobin invests these songs with their full meaning, and even finds the odd glimmer of hope where none was formerly apparent."

== Other endeavours ==
Tobin is also a promoter. For just over a year in 2005 she ran a club at the Progress Bar in Tufnell Park. She was also a director of the Vortex Jazz Club in Dalston.

She promotes Jazz at the Westcoast in Margate, Kent.

== Discography ==
=== As leader/solo ===
- Aililiu (Babel, 1995)
- Yell of the Gazelle (Babel, 1996)
- House of Women (Babel, 1998)
- Deep Song (Babel, 2000)
- You Draw the Line (Babel, 2003)
- Romance and Revolution (Babel, 2004)
- Secret Life of a Girl (Babel, 2008)
- Tapestry Unravelled (Trail Belle, 2010)
- Sailing to Byzantium (Trail Belle, 2012)
- A Thousand Kisses Deep (Trail Belle, 2014)
- Pelt (Trail Belle, 2016)

=== As guest performer ===
- What am I Here For? (Don Rendell, 1993)
- Winter Truce (and Homes Blaze) (Django Bates, 1995)
- Shepherd Wheel (Peter Fairclough, 1995)
- Lovers and Strangers (Hans Koller, 2001)
- Stability (Clark Tracey, 2001)
- Savage Utopia – Crass Agenda, 2004 (Babel/Exitstencil)
- Penny Rimbaud's 'How?' – Crass Agenda, 2004 (Babel)
- You're My Thrill – Peter Herbert, 2004 (Between the Lines)
- Remembering Nick Drake (Nick Smart's Black Eyed Dog, 2005)
- Introducing Barry Green (Barry Green, 2006)
- Six Strings & the Beat (Phil Robson, 2008)
- BBC Jazz Awards 2008

=== With Lammas ===
- Lammas (Lammas 1991)
- This Morning (1993)
- The Broken Road (1995)
- Sourcebook (1997)
- Sea Changes (1999)

=== Radio ===
- Out With Paganism and all that Jazz (2012) an award winning documentary for RTE Lyric FM presented by Tobin.

=== DVD ===
- Red, White & Blues (2003) A film about the 60's UK blues boom directed by Mike Figgis. Tobin performs with Humphrey Lyttelton.
- Derby Jazz Week – Promo DVD cover mount from Jazzwise magazine. Contains interview and performance of Brandy and Scars.
