= Quiet Night =

Quiet Night may refer to:

- "Quiet Night", a song from the 1937 musical On Your Toes
- Quiet Night (play), a 1941 Australian play by Dorothy Blewett
- Quiet Night (album), a 2014 album by South Korean singer-songwriter Seo Taiji

== See also ==
- Quiet Nights (disambiguation)
