= Ken Stubbs =

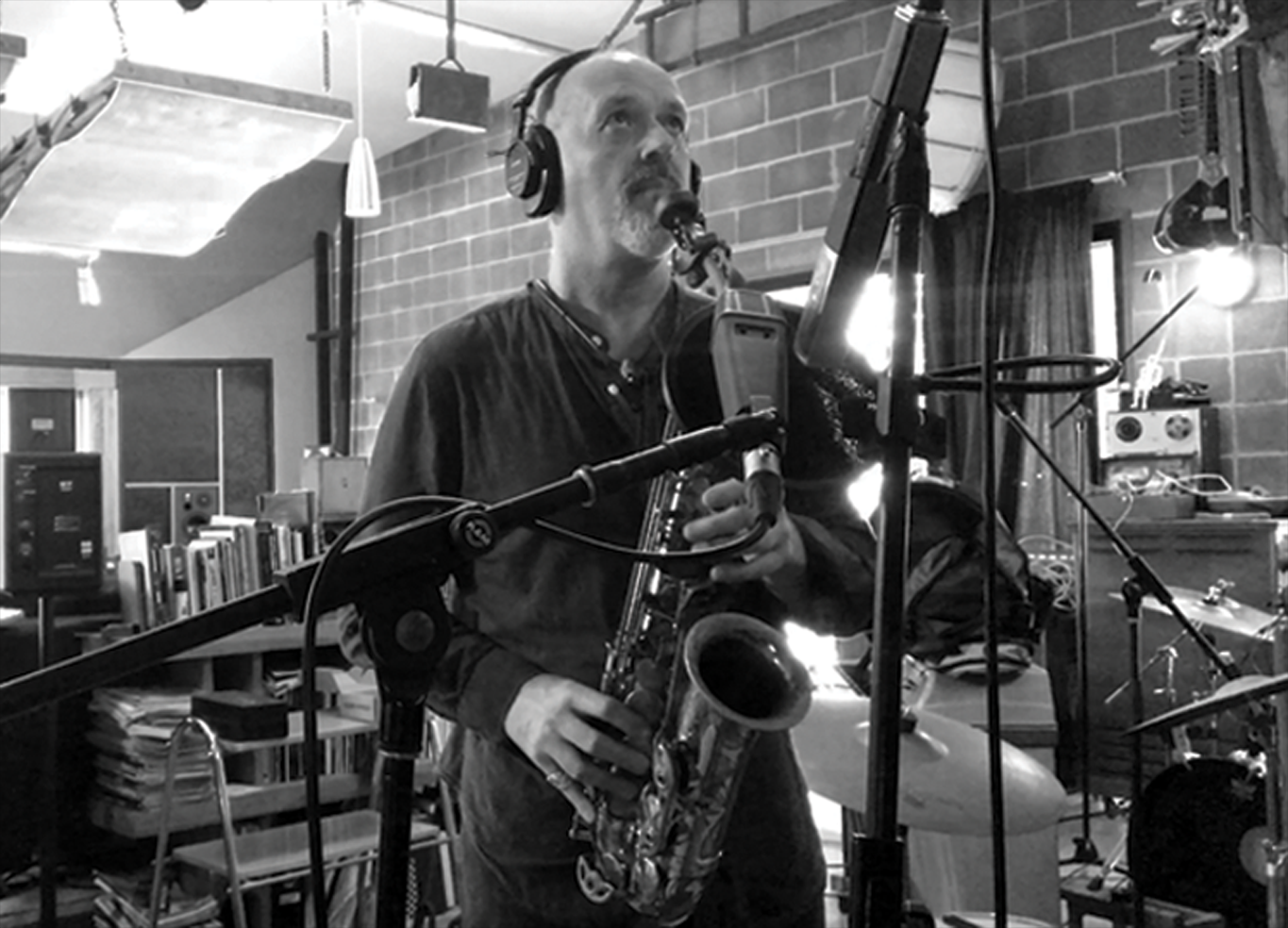
- Ken Stubbs, Byron Bay, Australia

Background information
- Born: 29 March 1961 (age 65); Liverpool, England
- Genres: Jazz, jazz fusion, free improvisation
- Occupations: Saxophonist, composer, teacher,
- Instrument: Alto saxophone
- Years active: 1980–present
- Labels: ECM, Cherryk Records
- Website: KenStubbs.com

Ken Stubbs (born 29 March 1961) is an English jazz musician, alto saxophonist and composer.

== Early life ==
Ken Stubbs was born in Old Swan, Liverpool, United Kingdom and later attended Blackpool Grammar School. In 1978-80 he studied saxophone, composition and conducting at Salford College under the tutorship of Goff Richards and Roy Newsome.

== As jazz musician ==
=== First House ===
In 1984, Ken Stubbs formed First House together with Django Bates on piano, Mick Hutton on bass and Martin France on drums.

=== Other projects ===
While living in London Ken Stubbs also played and recorded with Mike Walker, Jeremy Stacey, Gary Husband, Peter Erskine, Kenny Wheeler, John Taylor, Phil Robson, Orlando le Fleming, Mike Gibbs Orchestra and Chris McGregor's Brotherhood of Breath.

He was also a member of the UK jazz ensemble, Loose Tubes, appearing on the three live albums recorded at Ronnie Scott's Club in 1990, and released in 2010, 2012 and 2015.

In 2000 before leaving the UK to reside in Australia he recorded a quartet album, 'Ballads', featuring drummer, Gary Husband

In 2004 Ken Stubbs was one of the 60 composers invited to create one bar of music for the composition, 'Premature Celebration' by Django Bates - written for Evan Parker and the London Sinfonietta, to celebrate Evan's 60th birthday. It was performed at the FuseLeeds Festival and broadcast by BBC Radio 3.

Since living in Australia he has been a saxophone tutor at Queensland Conservatorium of Music as well as a saxophone tutor and big band director at both Southern Cross University, Lismore and Northern Rivers Conservatorium Arts Centre, NSW.

He has played and recorded with Australian jazz and improvising musicians Paul Grabowsky, Simon Barker, Steve Newcomb, Brett Hirst, Matt McMahon, James Muller, Scott Tinkler, John Morrison and John Hoffman.

Since 2011 there have been a series of recording projects with Simon Barker and Brett Hirst featuring Australian guitarist, James Muller, UK pianist's Ivo Neame, Jason Rebello and New York based pianists, Craig Taborn and Luis Perdomo

Since 1996 he has been developing a major on-line jazz education library resource.

== Discography ==
=== As leader ===
- 'Eréndira' (1985) - ECM
- 'Cantilena' (1989) - ECM
- 'Ballads' (2000) - with Gary Husband, Phil Robson, Mick Hutton - CherryK Records
- 'Strange Attractors' (2011) - with Scott Tinkler, Simon Barker, Brett Hirst, Steve Newcomb - CherryK Records
- 'Crooked Crooks Cracks' (2012) - Scott Tinkler, Simon Barker, Brett Hirst, Steve Newcomb - CherryK Records
- 'Big Hush' (2019) - Simon Barker, Brett Hirst, James Muller, Jason Rebello - CherryK Records
- 'Big Hush - I Us' (2020) - Simon Barker, Brett Hirst, James Muller, Jason Rebello, Matt McMahon, Phil Robson - CherryK Records
- 'Big Hush - I Us - LIVE' (2020) - Simon Barker, Brett Hirst, Paul Grabowsky - CherryK Records
- 'Reminiscence of a Soul' (2020) - Simon Barker, Brett Hirst, James Muller, Jason Rebello, Gerard Presencer - CherryK Records
- '3 Shadows, 4 Angels' (2021) - Simon Barker, Brett Hirst, Ivo Neame, James Muller - CherryK Records

=== With Loose Tubes ===
- 'Dancing On Frith Street' (Recorded live 1990) (2010)
- 'Säd Afrika' (Recorded live 1990) (2012)
- 'Arriving' (Recorded live 1990) (2015)
