= Phil Robson =

British jazz guitarist, bandleader & composer (born 1970)

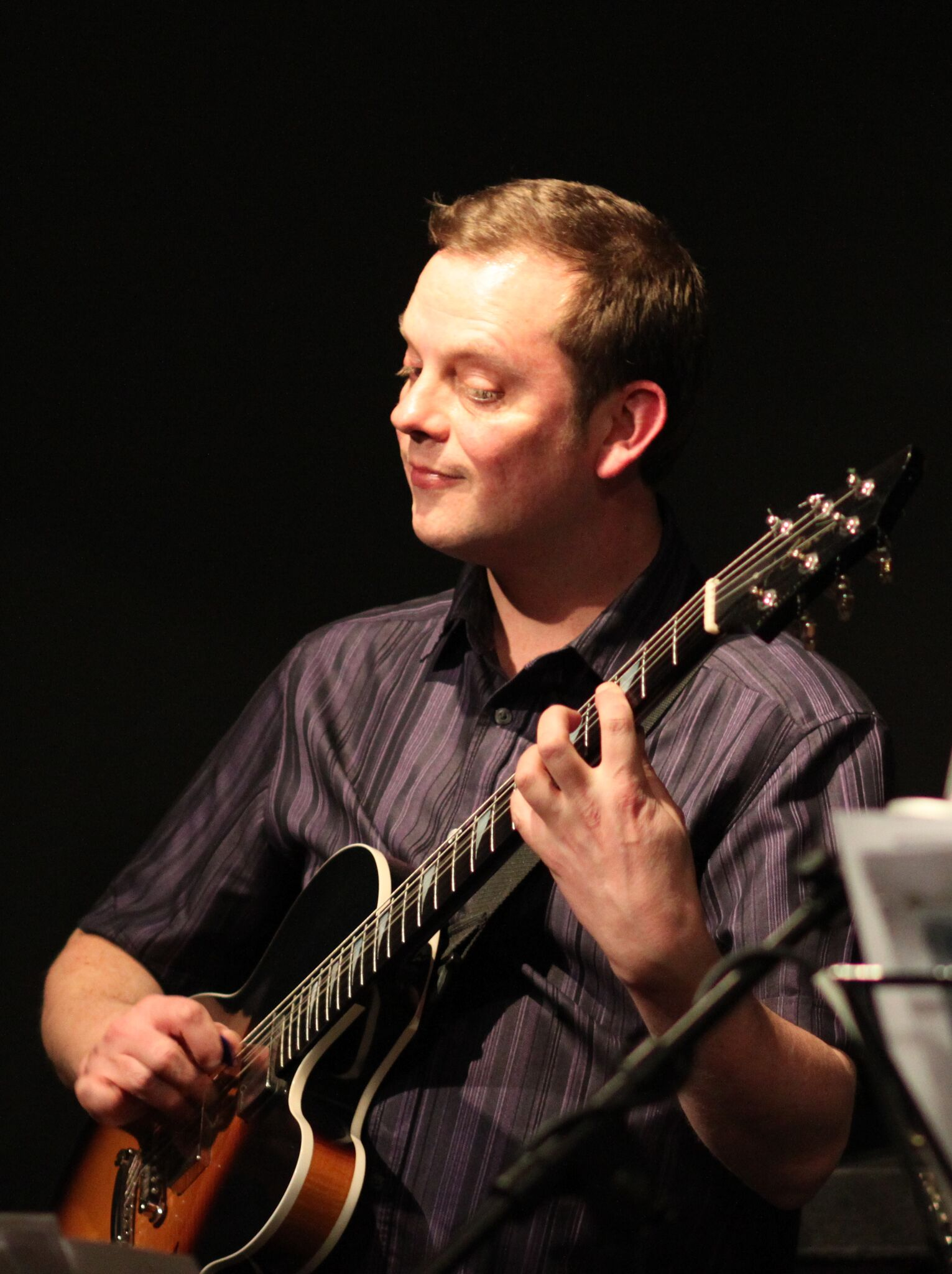
- Phil Robson

Background information
- Born: 1970 (age 55–56); Derby, England
- Genres: Jazz
- Occupations: Musician, composer, teacher
- Instrument: Guitar
- Years active: 1984–present
- Labels: Babel Label, Whirlwind Recordings
- Website: philrobson.net

Phil Robson is a British jazz guitarist, bandleader, and composer.

== Biography ==
Born in Derby (Derbyshire), England in 1970, Robson began guitar studies at age 14. He played in the house rhythm section at the local club with visiting musicians as John Etheridge and Bheki Mseleku as well as with his clarinettist father, Trevor Robson. He moved to London at the age of 18 where he studied at the Guildhall School Of Music and Drama, being the youngest student at the time to do the post graduate course in jazz studies. He went on to be an integral part of the London scene and has since been the leader of several acclaimed musical projects of his own as well as appearing as a sideman with many international artists including Barbra Streisand, Django Bates, Mark Turner, Kenny Wheeler, David Liebman, Dame Cleo Laine, Maceo Parker, Donny McCaslin, and Charles Earland, among others. He also co-led the UK jazz rock band Partisans with Julian Siegel and has been a long time partner of the Irish singer/songwriter Christine Tobin.

Robson is a professor of music at Trinity College of Music, the Guildhall School of Music and Drama, and the Royal Academy of Music. He was elected in 2015 as an honorary associate of the Royal Academy Of Music. He has been a visiting tutor at summer schools including The Dordogne International Jazz Summer School in France, The European Jazz Academy in Germany.

== Awards ==
Robson was elected Best Jazz Musician of the Year in the 2009 Parliamentary Jazz Awards. Swamp, his album with Partisans, was named Jazz CD of the Year’in the 2015 Parliamentary Jazz Awards. 2015 elected Honorary Associate of the Royal Academy of Music. 1998 Perrier Young Jazz Award for Best Instrumentalist of the Year. 1997 BT Awards: Best Soloist of the Year.

== Discography ==
- Partisans (EFZ, 1997)
- Impish (Babel, 2002)
- Screenwash (Babel, 2004)
- The Immeasurable Code (Whirlwind, 2011)
- The Cut-Off Point (Whirlwind, 2015)
