= Balloon Man (album) =

Studio album by Iain Ballamy
- Released: 1989
- Recorded: December 1988
- Studio: The Live House Studios, Launceston, Cornwall
- Genre: Jazz
- Length: 38:35
- Label: EG Records
- Producer: Balloon Man

Iain Ballamy chronology
Balloon Man (1989)	All Men Amen (1995)

Professional ratings
Review scores
Source	Rating
Allmusic	4.5/5 stars
The Penguin Guide to Jazz	3/4 stars

Balloon Man is the debut album by English saxophonist Iain Ballamy, with Django Bates, Steve Watts and Martin France. It was released on the EG label in 1989.

== Reception ==
The Times wrote "After listening to Balloon Man, it is tempting to call in the Fraud Squid to examine his birth certificate. No 25-year-old could possibly play with so much confidence and maturity... possibly the most assured session so far by any player of his generation... Where most of his contemporaries are still at the stage of reproducing their favourite saxophonists, Ballamy sounds absolutely individual, even when moving between alto, tenor and soprano horns." "The Times" [Balancing Act]. 1989.

AllMusic awarded the album with 4.5 out of 5 stars. The Penguin Guide review says: "Although closely associated with the Loose Tubes big band, his debut as a leader suggests that he is very much his own man. Rather than pursuing a particular style on one of the saxophones, he plays with a light-toned fluency on both alto and tenor; and instead of featuring himself, he prefers to work closely with his comrade Bates – many of the tracks here are almost like contrapuntal duets with rhythm accompaniment".

== Track listing ==
All compositions by Iain Ballamy except where noted.

1. "Mode Forbode" – 4:41
2. "Remember..." – 7:25
3. "Rahsaan" – 4:14
4. "Strawberries" – 6:58
5. "Albert" – 6:05
6. "Balloon Man" – 4:46
7. "Jumble Sale" – 2:50
8. "All I Ask of You" (Gregory Norbet) – 7:41

== Personnel ==
- Iain Ballamy – soprano, alto and tenor saxophones
- Django Bates – keyboards, tenor horn on "Albert"
- Steve Watts – bass
- Martin France – drums
