= Tim Garland =

British jazz saxophonist, composer & bandleader (born 1966)

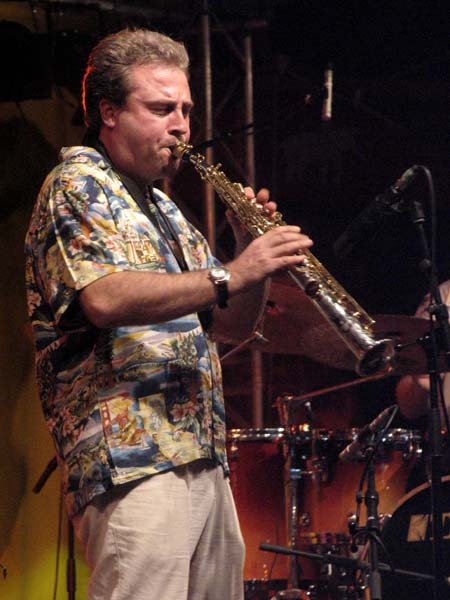
- Tim Garland at Moers Festival 2004, Germany

Background information
- Born: 19 October 1966 (age 59); Ilford, Essex, England
- Genres: Jazz
- Occupation: Musician
- Instrument: Saxophone
- Years active: 1980s–present

Tim Garland (born 19 October 1966) is a British jazz saxophonist, composer, and bandleader. His compositions draw from modern jazz and classical concert music.

== Career ==
Garland was born in Ilford, Essex and grew up in Canterbury, Kent. He started on clarinet and piano before switching to saxophone when he was fifteen. At the Guildhall School of Music he studied jazz and classical composition. In 1988 he recorded his first album, Points on the Curve.

As a bandleader, he first achieved recognition with the jazz/folk crossover group Lammas (which included Don Paterson and Christine Tobin), going on with a number of groups under his own name, the Dean Street Underground Orchestra, Storms/Nocturnes, Acoustic Triangle, and the Lighthouse Project.

During the 1990s, he worked with Ronnie Scott and Ralph Towner. After releasing Enter the Fire, his second album as a leader, he became a member of the Origin band led by Chick Corea. He has also belonged to bands led by Bill Bruford, Allan Ganley, and John Dankworth.

He has fulfilled commissions from the Royal Northern Sinfonia, BBC Concert Orchestra, and Westminster Abbey Choir, as well as small and large jazz-based ensembles. In 2013, he premiered his suite Songs to the North Sky for jazz trio and orchestra, written in 2012 for the trio Lighthouse with the Royal Northern Sinfonia, performed by them and the London Sinfonia.

In 2009, Garland won a Grammy Award for his part in creating "The New Crystal Silence" which celebrated Chick Corea and Gary Burton's partnership. He orchestrated five of Corea's pieces for the Sydney Symphony Orchestra.

== Awards and honours ==
- Musician of the Year, Cross-Parliamentary Jazz Society, 2006
- Grammy Award, The New Crystal Silence, 2009
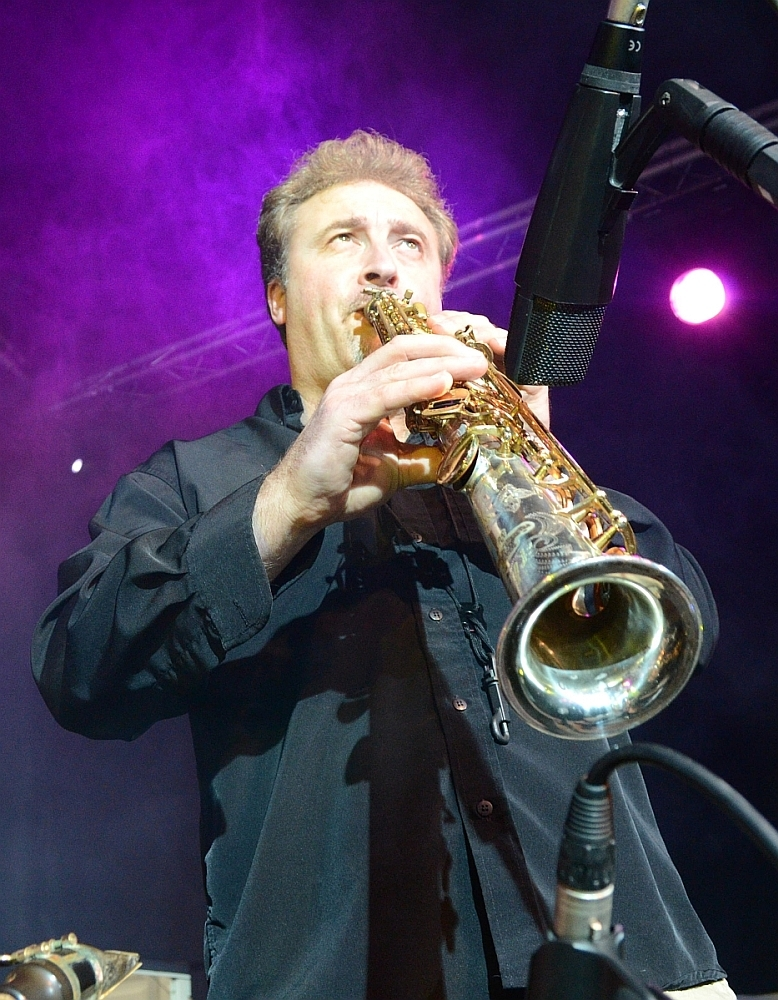
- Tim Garland Performing at the Cheltenham Jazz Festival 7 May 2012
  Album of the Year, One, Jazzwise Readers' Poll, 2016

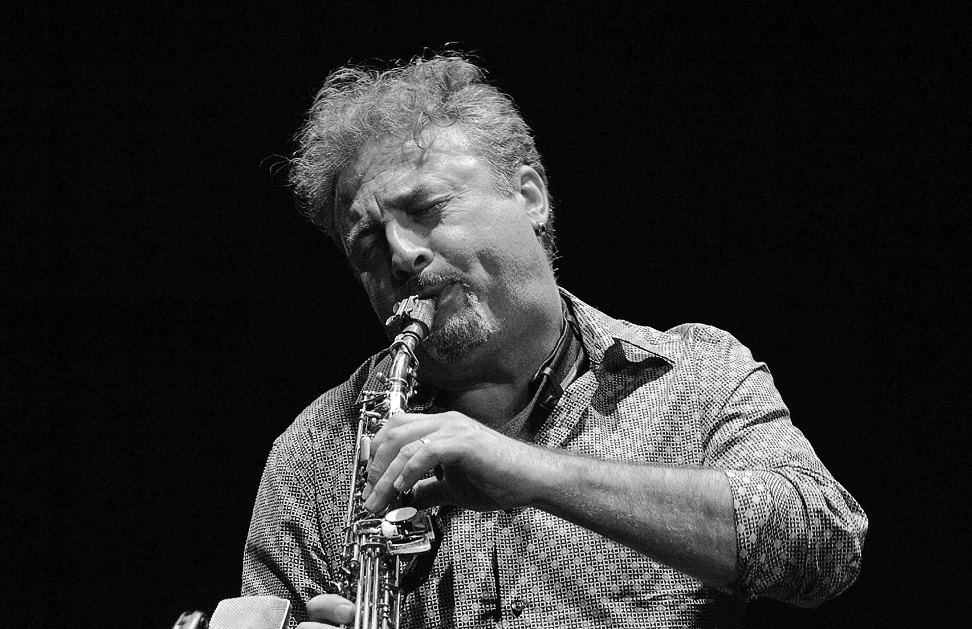
Tim Garland performing at the Arena Theatre, Wolverhampton, 17-04-2015

== Discography ==
=== As leader ===
- 1988 Points on the Curve (Future Music)
- 1995 Tales from the Sun (EFZ)
- 1997 Enter the Fire (Linn)
- 2000 Made by Walking (Concord/Stretch)
- 2002 Playing to the Moon (Jazz House)
- 2004 Change of Season (Sirocco)
- 2005 If the Sea Replied (Sirocco)
- 2009 Libra (Global Mix/Proper)
- 2002 Jazz, Boogie, Classical (Audio Network Plc) with Geoff Keezer
- 2011 Storms/Nocturnes (Origin) with Geoff Keezer and Joe Locke
- 2011 Via (Origin)
- 2012 Lighthouse (ACT)
- 2014 Songs to the North Sky (Edition)
- 2015 Return to the Fire (Edition)
- 2016 One (Edition)

=== As sideman ===
With Dominic Alldis

- 2000 If Love Were All: The Songs of Noel Coward
- 2002 Watch What Happens: The Songs of Michel Legrand

With Chick Corea

- 2000 Originations
- 2006 The Ultimate Adventure
- 2008 The New Crystal Silence
- 2012 The Continents: Concerto for Jazz Quintet & Chamber Orchestra
- 2013 The Vigil

With Bill Bruford

- 2004 Random Acts of Happiness
- 2006 Earthworks Underground Orchestra

With Alec Dankworth

- 1994 Nebuchadnezzar
- 1996 Rhythm Changes

With Joe Locke

- 2001 Storytelling
- 2002 State of Soul
- 2002 Storms/Nocturnes
- 2003 Rising Tide, Storms/Nocturnes
- 2011 Via, Storms/Nocturnes

With others

- 1997 Medazzaland, Duran Duran
- 2000 Rhythm Indicative, Damon Brown
- 2001 Stability, Clark Tracey
- 2003 Dance for Human Folks, London Jazz Composers' Orchestra
- 2003 Falling Up, Geoff Keezer
- 2003 Mad Dogs and Englishmen, Graham Dalby
- 2005 Dancing with the Moon, John Aram
- 2006 Brightness of Being, Paul Bollenback
- 2011 It Happens Quietly, Jacqui Dankworth
- 2012 Soul Shadows, Denise Donatelli
