= Iain Ballamy =

British composer and saxophonist (born 1964)

- Born: 20 February 1964 (age 62); Guildford, Surrey, England
- Genre: Jazz
- Occupations: Musician, composer
- Instrument: Saxophone
- Years active: 1980s–present
- Labels: Basho, Rune Grammofon, Editions EG, Feral, B&W Music
- Website: ballamy.com

Iain Ballamy (born 20 February 1964) is a British composer and saxophonist. He was featured as one of the world's all-time greats in BBC Music Magazine's "100 Jazz Legends". The Guardian described him as "one of the world's distinctive saxophone voices". One of his closest musical collaborators is Django Bates.

== Career ==
Ballamy was born in Guildford, Surrey, and educated at George Abbot School, Guildford, from 1975 to 1980. He then studied Musical Instrument Technology from 1980 to 1982 at Merton College. He took piano lessons from age of 6 to 14.

He discovered saxophone in 1978 with three lessons and his first professional gig was in 1980. He played Ronnie Scotts as Iain Ballamy Quartet at age 20. He was a founding member of Loose Tubes in 1984. First recording with Billy Jenkins in 1985, his first solo album, Balloon Man, was released in 1988. Clive Davis' review in The Times described it as "possibly the most assured session so far by any player of his generation"

During his career he has performed or recorded with a wide range of musicians including Gil Evans, Hermeto Pascoal, New York Composers Orchestra, Carla Bley, Dewey Redman, George Coleman, London Sinfonietta, Françios Jeanneau, Daniel Humair, Mike Gibbs, Randy Weston, Karnataka College of Percussion, Sax Assault, Jazz Train, Freebop, Nishat Khan, R.A.Ramamani, T.A.S. Mani, Clare Martin, Human Chain, Dr. L. Subramaniam, Tom Robinson, Charlie Watts Orchestra, Jeremy Stacey, Randy Weston, Joanna MacGregor, Delightful Precipice, Bill Bruford, Django Bates, Mark Wingfield, Jane Chapman, Bryan Ferry, Everything But The Girl, Food, Food for Quartet, Loose Tubes, Oxcentrics, Ian Shaw, Slim Gaillard, Ultramarine (band), Ashley Slater, Hungry Ants, Ronnie Scott, Gordon Beck, Britten Sinfonia, and Gay Dad.

In 1999, Ballamy founded the record label Feral Records, in partnership with graphic artist and filmmaker Dave McKean. In 2005, he composed the musical score for the movie MirrorMask. He also composed the score for Luna, which is also directed by McKean.

Ballamy is a visiting professor currently at the Guildhall School of Music and Drama, Royal Academy of Music and the Royal Welsh College of Music & Drama.

His latest musical endeavours include the Iain Ballamy Quartet, as well as 'Fascinada', a quintet playing the music of Brazil. The group plays textural improvisations that lead into compositions by the likes of Ivan Lins, Milton Nascimento, Antonio Carlos Jobim & Hermeto Pascoal. The group features Welsh pianist Huw Warren and guitarist Rob Luft.

== Discography ==
=== As leader ===
- Balloon Man (1988)
- All Men Amen (1995)
- Acme (1995)
- Pepper Street Interludes (2000) with Stian Carstensen, Norma Winstone, Martin France and Matthew Sharpe
- Signal To Noise (2000), BBC Radio 3 Play Adaptation of the graphic novel by Neil Gaiman and Dave McKean
- The Little Radio (2004) with Stian Carstensen
- MirrorMask (Original Motion Picture Soundtrack) (2005)
- Anorak (2007)
- Riversphere, Vol. 1 (2025)

=== As co-leader ===
With Food (Ballamy & Thomas Strønen)

- Food (1996) – Food with Arve Henriksen and Mats Eilertsen
- Organic and GM Food (2001) with Arve Henriksen and Mats Eilertsen
- Veggie (2002) with Arve Henriksen and Mats Eilertsen
- Last Supper (2004, Rune Grammofon) with Arve Henriksen and Mats Eilertsen
- Molecular Gastronomy (2007, Rune Grammofon) – Duo: Iain Ballamy & Thomas Strønen, feat. Maria Kannegaard & Ashley Slater
- Quiet Inlet (2010, ECM Records) with Nils Petter Molvaer and Christian Fennesz
- Mercurial Balm (2012, ECM Records) with Christian Fennesz, Eivind Aarset, Prakash Sontakke and Nils Petter Molvaer
- This Is Not a Miracle (ECM, 2013 [2015])
- What's New? Ballamy, Ian Shaw and Jamie Safir (Silent Wish Records, SWRCD1 2020)

With Quercus (trio including June Tabor and Huw Warren)

- Quercus (2013, ECM Records)
- Nightfall (2017, ECM Records)

=== As sideman ===
With Loose Tubes

- Loose Tubes (1985)
- Delightful Precipice (1986)
- Open Letter (1988)
- JazzBühne Berlin'87 Vol.16 Loose Tubes

With Billy Jenkins

- Greenwich (1985)
- Uncommerciality Vol 1 (1986)
- Scratches of Spain (1987)
- Motorway At Night (1988)
- Jazz Cafe Concerts Vol 1 (1989)
- Jazz Cafe Concerts Vol 2 (1989)
- True Love Collection (1999)
- First Aural Art Exhibition (2006)

With Bill Bruford's Earthworks

- Earthworks (1987)
- Dig? (1989)
- All Heaven Broke Loose (1991)
- Stamping Ground (1994)
- Heavenly Bodies (1997)

With Django Bates

- Summer Fruits (and Unrest) (JMT, 1993)
- Winter Truce (and Homes Blaze) (JMT, 1995)
- Good Evening...Here is the News (1995)
- Like Life (1997)
- Quiet Nights (1998)
- You Live and Learn...(Apparently) (2004)

With Ian Shaw

- Ghostsongs
- Taking it to Hart
- Famous Rainy Day
- In a New York Minute

With Ray Russell

- Childscape (1987)
- A Table Near The Band
- At Montreux Jazz Festival

With others

- Dominic Alldis, Themes From French Cinema (2004)
- Mike Gibbs – By The Way
- Clarke Tracey – Stability
- The Hungry Ants, Hungry Ants
- John Donaldson, Ray Drummond and Victor Lewis – Meeting in Brooklyn
- Claire Martin – Devil May Care
- Linda Sharrock – Like A River,
- Mo Foster – Southern Reunion,
- John Stevens – Blue
- Tom Robinson – Hope and Glory
- Malaya Marutha – Span the Globe
- Sax Assault – BANG
- Michiel Braam – Playing the Second Coolbook
- Dave McKean and Neil Gaiman – BV Haast
- Louis Vidal – Vermeer
- Iva Bittova – Plaza
- Mark Wingfield and Jane Chapman – Three Windows
- Eric Starr She (2003) Such Is Life (2015)

== Commissions ==
- 1995 Estuary English – Apollo Saxophone Quartet
- 1996 Mirror Signal Manouvre – Apollo Saxophone Quartet
- 1996 ACME – Commissioned by Birmingham Jazz
- 1997 Oblique – Commissioned by SAMPAD/Birmingham Jazz
- 1998 Four and a half minutes late Jane Chapman, Solo Harpsichord
- 1998 Walpurgis Night Joanna MacGregor – Duet for Piano & Tenor Sax

== Awards ==
- 1985 John Dankworth Cup, Best Soloist
- 1995 BT British Jazz Award, Best Ensemble – Balloon Man
- 2001 BBC Jazz Award for Innovation

== Group history ==
- Balloon Man 1983 – 1993
- Loose Tubes 1984 – 1990
- Billy Jenkins Voice of God 1985 to date
- Bill Bruford’s Earthworks 1986 – 1992
- Django Bates’ Human Chain and Delightful Precipice 1992 to date
- Iain Ballamy's ACME 1996 to date
- Food For Quartet 1997 to date
- Anorak 2001 to date
- The Little Radio 2003 to date

== British Council tours ==
Romania 1985, Morocco 1995, China 1997, Senegal 1997, India 1996 and 1998, Lithuania 1998, and Colombia 1998.

== Television ==
Jazz 606, Meltdown, The Tube, Bergerac, Illuminations, Stay Lucky, Right to Reply, Wogan, and Ronnie Corbett Show.

== Radio ==
- "Cashier Number 6 Please" Documentary exploring the world of the ubiquitous automated voice – on railway stations, in the post office, on the phone and even around the home. With the music of Iain Ballamy & Ashley Slater. Inc interviews. 23/05/2005
- Jazz on 3. Iain Ballamy and Stian Carstensen in session. 06/02/2004
- Late Junction. Iain Ballamy and Stian Carstensen play live in the studio. Radio Three 6/2/2004.
- Jazz Record Requests. Listeners' requests performed by Iain Ballamy, John Parricelli, Tim Harries and Ian Thomas. Live from the London Jazz Festival.
- Front Row. White Horses TV theme by Jackie Lee and its enduring appeal since 1968 discussed by Iain Ballamy, with clip [3.40] Date: 04/09/2003
- Between the Ears. Iain Ballamy improvises on the Drake song "It Was a Very Good Year". 29.12.02
- Jazz on 3. Howard Riley and Iain Ballamy duo. 1.11.02
- Jazz on 3. Iain Ballamy plays original compositions with his group Cob at Ronnie Scott's 21.12.01
- Jazz on 3. Norma Winstone performs with John Parricelli and Iain Ballamy. 4.3.00
- Jazz Notes. London Jazz Festival set by Ian Shaw, Cedar Walton, Iain Ballamy, Mark Hodgson and Mark Fletcher. 25.1.00
- Jazz on 3. Iain Ballamy's Food for Quartet – a new Anglo-Norwegian collaboration between Iain Ballamy, Thomas Stronen, Mats Eilerstein and Arve Henriksen. Recorded at the Cheltenham Jazz Festival.
- Signal to Noise, Dave McKean and Neil Gaiman, R4, 1997.
- Impressions. Iain Ballamy discusses his various projects and performs with his group Hungry Ants, with Richard Fairhust, Steve Watts and Tim Giles. 20.1.96
- "Jazz at the Bath Festival". Human Chain (Django Bates, Iain Ballamy, Stuart Hall, Martin France) with Joanna MacGregor. BBC Radio 3 10.7.93
- Straight Face. Group led by Mick Hutton featuring Claire Martin, Iain Ballamy, Nikki Iles and Steve Arguelles. BBC Radio 3 27.2.93

== Film sessions ==
- My Son the Fanatic
- Joseph Losey: The Man with Four Names
- Absolute Beginners
- The Last Days of General Patton
- MirrorMask

== Dance ==
2003 – 2004 Dance Ranjabiati Sircar/SAMPAD, SANKALPAM

== Theatre ==
Out There, Riverside Studios
