= Django Bates =

British composer, musician, band leader and educator (born 1960)

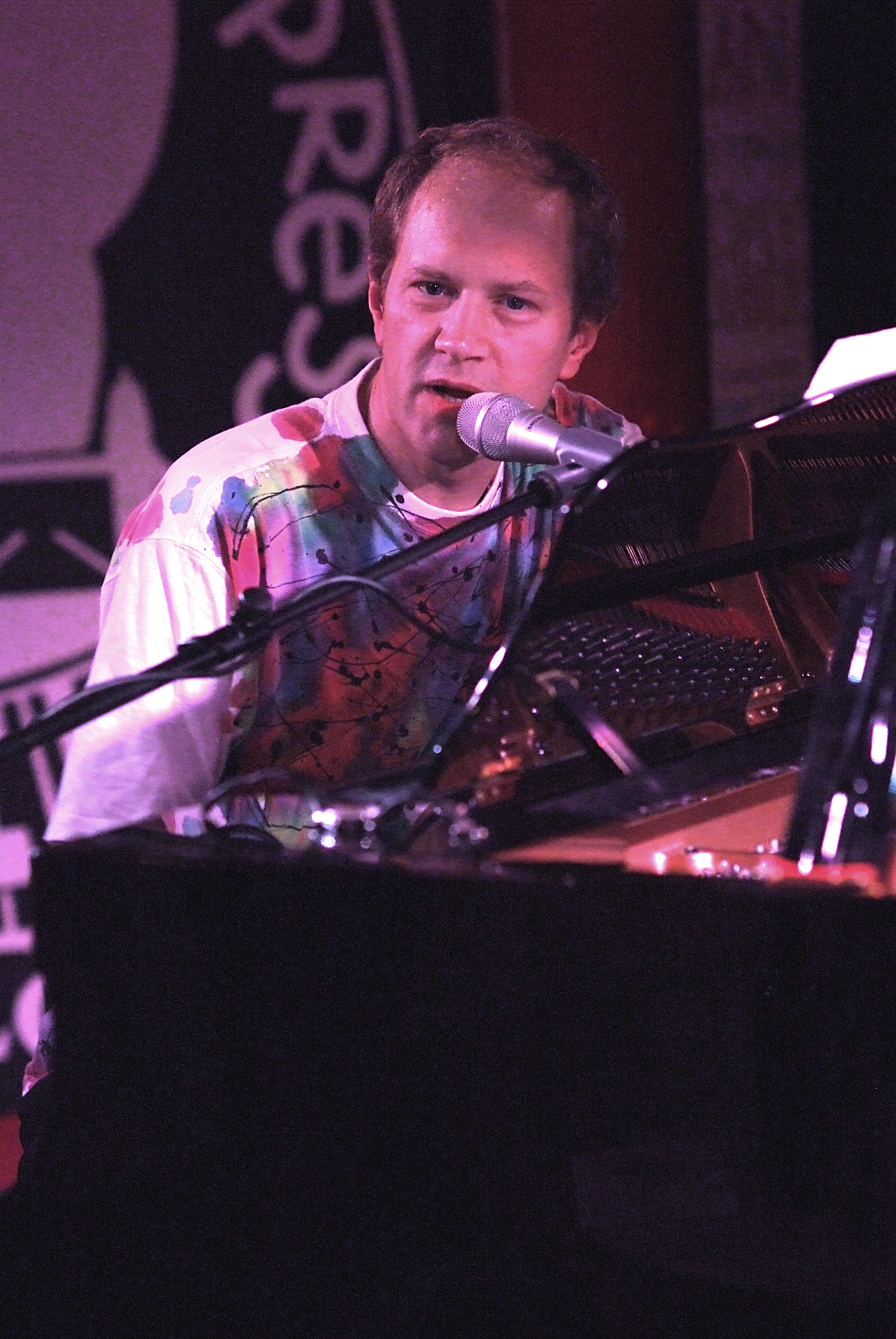

Background information
- Born: Leon Bates; 2 October 1960 (age 65); Beckenham, Kent, England
- Genres: Jazz, jazz fusion
- Occupations: Musician, composer, educator
- Instruments: Piano, keyboards, tenor horn
- Years active: 1980s–present
- Labels: EG, ECM, Lost Marble, Screwgun, JMT
- Website: www.djangobates.co.uk

Django Bates (born Leon Bates, 2 October 1960) is a British jazz musician, composer, multi-instrumentalist, band leader and educator. He plays the piano, keyboards and the tenor horn. Bates has been described as "one of the most talented musicians Britain has produced... his work covers the entire spectrum of jazz, from early jazz through to bebop and free jazz to jazz-rock fusion."

In addition to his jazz work, he is also a classical composer (writing both large- and small-scale compositions on commission), theatre composer, and has taught as a professor at various European music schools. As a leader, his bands have included Human Chain, Delightful Precipice, Quiet Nights, Powder Room Collapse Orchestra and Belovèd, and he was also a leading figure in Loose Tubes and Bill Bruford's Earthworks.

== Early life ==
Bates was born in Beckenham, then in Kent, now Greater London, England, and attended Sedgehill School. While at this school, he also attended the Centre for Young Musicians in London (1971–77), where he learned trumpet, piano, and violin. In 1977–78, he studied at Morley College. In 1978, he enrolled at the Royal College of Music to study composition but left after two weeks.

== As jazz musician ==
Bates founded Human Chain in 1979 and, in the 1980s, he rose to prominence in a jazz orchestra called Loose Tubes. In 1991, he started the 19-piece jazz orchestra Delightful Precipice. He also assembled the Powder Room Collapse Orchestra (which recorded Music for The Third Policeman) and created Circus Umbilicus, a musical circus show. Bates has appeared as a sideman or member of Dudu Pukwana's Zila, Tim Whitehead's Borderline, Ken Stubbs's First House, Bill Bruford's Earthworks, Sidsel Endresen, and in the bands of George Russell and George Gruntz. He has performed with Michael Brecker, Tim Berne, Christian Jarvi, Vince Mendoza, David Sanborn, Kate Rusby, and Don Alias.

== As composer ==
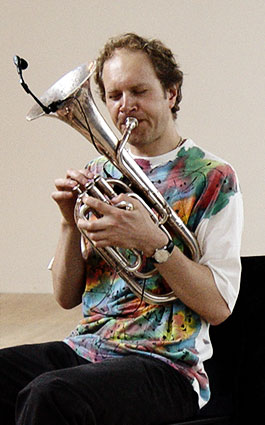
Django Bates

Bates has concentrated on writing large-scale compositions on commission. These include:

- "Dream Kitchen" for percussionist Evelyn Glennie
- "Fine Frenzy" for the Shobhana Jeyasingh Dance Company
- "What It's Like to be Alive", a piano concerto for Joanna MacGregor and the Royal Liverpool Philharmonic Orchestra
- "2000 Years Beyond UNDO", a concerto for electric keyboard that was performed at the millennium Barbican Festival

Bates worked closely with director Lucy Bailey on several theatre projects, including Gobbledegook for the Gogmagogs, Baby Doll, (Birmingham Rep, National Theatre, Albery Theatre), Stairs to the Roof (Chichester Festival Theatre), The Postman Always Rings Twice (West Yorkshire Playhouse, Albery Theatre) and Titus Andronicus (Shakespeare's Globe). They also worked on a short film You Can Run. Other theatre work includes Gregory Doran's production of As You Like It (RSC), and Campbell Graham's Out There!.

Bates was the inaugural artistic director of the music festival FuseLeeds in 2004. He used this opportunity to initiate the first orchestral commission for Jonny Greenwood of Radiohead. Bates also commissioned sixty composers including Laurie Anderson, Gavin Bryars, Patrick Moore, and John Zorn, to write one bar each. He then quilted these bars into the piece "Premature Celebration", which was performed by Evan Parker and the London Sinfonietta to celebrate Parker's 60th birthday.

== Teaching ==
In 2002, Bates was a tutor at the Banff Centre jazz programme alongside Jim Black and Dave Douglas. In July 2005, Bates was appointed Professor of Rhythmic Music at the Rhythmic Music Conservatory (RMC) in Copenhagen, Denmark. He was appointed visiting professor of jazz at the Royal Academy of Music in London in September 2010. In September 2011, he was appointed Professor of Jazz at HKB Bern, Switzerland.

== Awards and honours ==
The Wire voted Bates Best UK Jazz Composer in 1987 and 1990.

- The Jazzpar Prize, 1997
- The Ivors Jazz Award, 2019

In 2008, he was nominated for the PRS New Music Award. He was awarded a fellowship by the Leeds College of Music in 1995.

== Discography ==
An asterisk (*) indicates that the year is that of release.

=== As leader/co-leader ===
Year recorded	Title	Label	Personnel/Notes
1986	Human Chain		With Steve Argüelles (drums, percussion)
1987	Cashin' In	EG	As Human Chain; most tracks trio, with Steve Argüelles (drums), Stuart Hall (strings, piccolo); one track quartet, with Steve Buckley (penny whistle) added
1990	Music for The Third Policeman	Ah Um	With Steve Buckley (tin whistle, alto sax, clarinet, bicycle bell), Steve Berry (cello, double bass), Martin France (drums, percussion), Stuart Hall (banjo, violin, guitar, mandolin), Sarah Harrison (violin, hooter), Robert Juritz (bassoon), Dai Pritchard (clarinet, bass clarinet); Eddie Parker (bass flute), Dave Pattman (bongos), Ashley Slater (bass trombone) are added on one or two tracks each. Live performance from 2000 on YouTube:
1993	Summer Fruits (and Unrest)	JMT	With Eddie Parker (flute, bass flute), Sarah Homer (clarinet, bass clarinet), Iain Ballamy and Steve Buckley (soprano sax, alto sax), Mark Lockheart and Barak Schmool (tenor sax), Julian Argüelles (baritone sax), Sid Gauld (high trumpet), Chris Batchelor (soloing trumpet), David Laurence (French horn), Roland Bates (trombone), Richard Henry (bass trombone), Sarah Waterhouse (tuba), Steve Watts (acoustic bass), Mike Mondesir (electric bass), Stuart Hall (electric guitar, violin, lap steel, banjo), Martin France (drums), Thebe Lipare (percussion)
1994	Autumn Fires (and Green Shoots)	JMT	Solo piano
1995	Winter Truce (and Homes Blaze)	JMT	With Eddie Parker (flute, bass flute), Iain Ballamy (soprano sax, alto sax, tenor sax), Steve Buckley (soprano sax, alto sax, tin whistle), Mark Lockheart (tenor sax, clarinet), Barak Schmool (tenor sax, piccolo), Julian Argüelles (soprano sax, baritone sax), Sid Gauld and Chris Batchelor (trumpet), David Laurence (French horn), Roland Bates (trombone), Richard Henry (bass trombone), Sarah Waterhouse (tuba), Mike Mondesir (electric bass), Stuart Hall (guitar, violin, banjo), Martin France (drums, percussion), Christine Tobin (vocals)
1995*	Good Evening...Here Is the News	Decca/Argo	
1997	Like Life	Storyville	With the Danish Radio Jazz Orchestra and others
1998	Quiet Nights	Screwgun	With Iain Ballamy (sax, harmonica), Josefine Cronholm (vocals, Tibetan bells), Mike Mondesir (bass), Martin France (drums, percussion)
2003	You Live and Learn...(Apparently)	Lost Marble	With Iain Ballamy (tenor sax), Chris Batchelor (trumpet), Josefine Lindstrand (bells, vocals), Deirdre Cooper (cello), Nic Pendlebury (viola), Charles Mutter and Ian Humphries (violin), Mike Mondesir (bass, vocals), Martin France (drums, percussion); David Sanborn (alto sax), Jim Mullen (guitar), Laurence Cottle (bass), Barak Schmool (percussion) added on one track each
2008*	Spring Is Here (Shall We Dance?)	Lost Marble	With 19-piece band
2008–09	Beloved Bird	Lost Marble	Trio, with Petter Eldh (bass), Peter Bruun (drums)
2011	Confirmation	Lost Marble	Most tracks trio, with Petter Eldh (bass), Peter Bruun (drums); some tracks quartet, with Ashley Slater (vocals) added
2016	The Study of Touch	ECM	Trio, with Petter Eldh (bass), Peter Bruun (drums)
2017	Saluting Sgt. Pepper	Edition	With the Frankfurt Radio Big Band
2020	Tenacity	Lost Marble	Trio, with Petter Eldh (bass), Peter Bruun (drums)

=== As sideman ===
With Loose Tubes

- Loose Tubes (1985)
- Delightful Precipice (1986)
- Open Letter (1988)
- Dancing on Frith Street (recorded live 1990) (2010)
- Säd Afrika (recorded live 1990) (2012)

With Billy Jenkins

- Greenwich (1985)
- Uncommerciality Vol 1 (1986)
- Scratches of Spain (1987)

With First House

- Eréndira (1985)
- Cantilena (1989)

With Bill Bruford's Earthworks

- Earthworks (1987)
- Dig? (1989)
- All Heaven Broke Loose (1991)
- Stamping Ground (1994)
- Heavenly Bodies (1997)

With Iain Ballamy

- Balloon Man (1989)
- All Men Amen (1995)

With Tim Berne's Caos Totale

- Nice View (JMT, 1994)

With Anouar Brahem

- Blue Maqams (ECM, 2017)
- After the Last Sky (ECM, 2025)

With Sidsel Endresen

- So I Write (1990)
- Exile (1993)

With Julian Argüelles

- Skull View (1997)
- Escapade (1999)

With others

- Dudu Pukwana – Life in Bracknell and Willisau (1983)
- Tim Whitehead's Borderline – English People (1983)
- Dudu Pukwana – Zila '86 (1986)
- Social Systems – Research (1987)
- The Dedication Orchestra – Spirits Rejoice (1992)
- Hank Roberts – Little Motor People (JMT, 1993)
- Christy Doran – Play the music of Jimi Hendrix (1994)
- Harry Beckett – Bates plays piano on song: 'Les Jardins du Casino' – Les Jardins du Casino (1995), Maxine (2010)
- Michael Gibbs — Big Music (ACT, 1996)
- Bendik Hofseth – Colours (1997)
- Søren Nørbo Trio – Debates (2005)
- Marius Neset – Golden XPlosion (2011)
