= Martin France =

English jazz drummer (1964–2024)

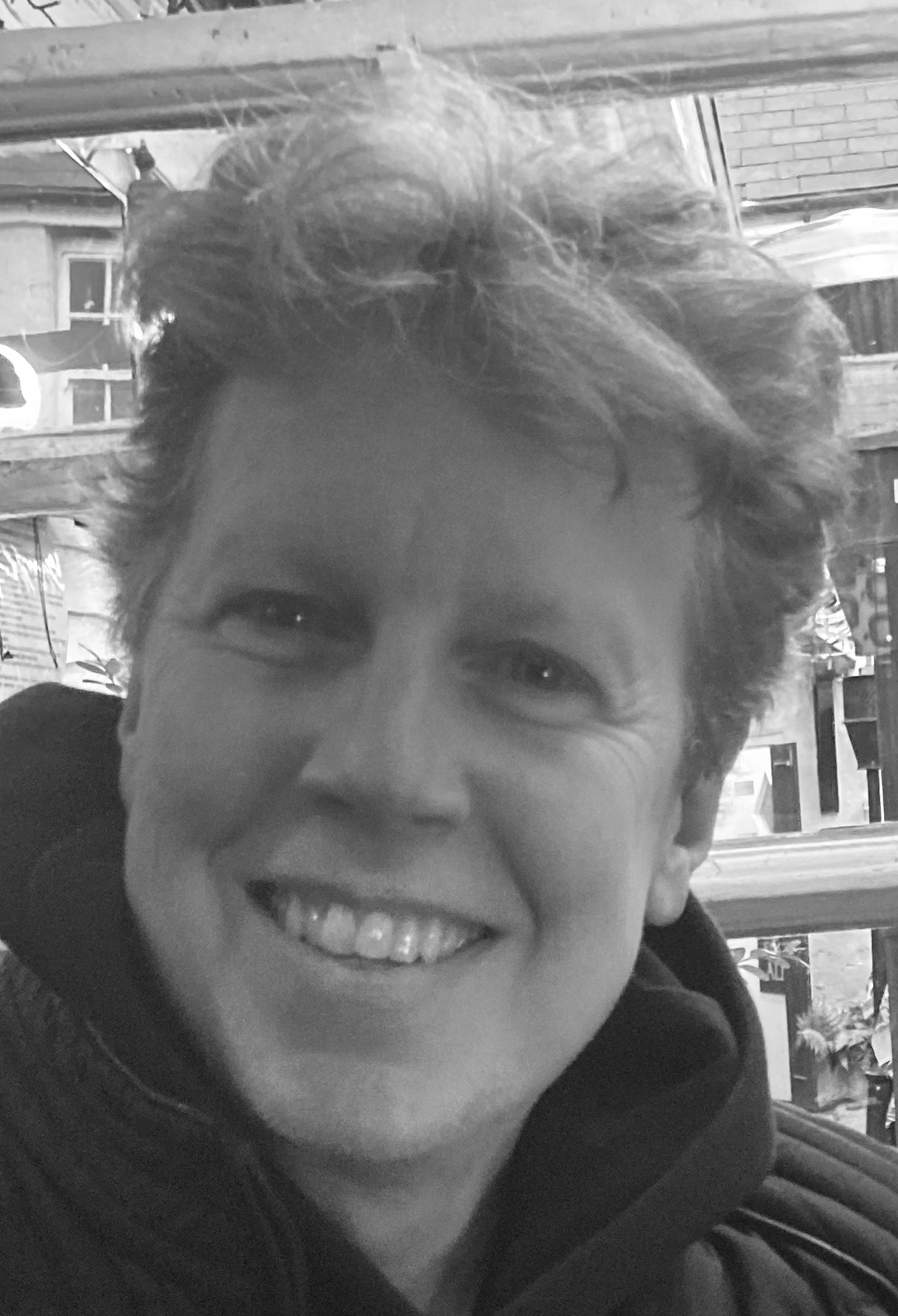
- France in 2018

Background information
- Born: 29 February 1964; Rainham, Kent, England
- Died: 5 September 2024 (aged 60)
- Genres: Jazz
- Occupation: Musician
- Instrument: Drums
- Years active: 1980s–2024
- Label: ECM

Martin France (29 February 1964 – 5 September 2024) was a British jazz drummer. He recorded on over 100 albums and was a professor at the Royal Academy of Music in London. He was sponsored by Paiste cymbals.

== Life and career ==
France began performing at the age of twelve with singers in Working Men's clubs and organ trios in Manchester, England. After moving to London in 1983, he began his recording career for ECM. He has been active for many years as a studio musician in London, performing on recording sessions for European and American films and television. He was involved in composing music for KPM/EMI in London which has been used for worldwide TV and commercial broadcast.

His use of electronic and sequenced drums and percussion has resulted in performances and recording sessions for many musicians. He released two albums with his band Spin Marvel. They performed at Cheltenham Jazz Festival in the UK with the line up featuring Nils-Petter Molvaer and John Paul Jones of Led Zeppelin. He was a regular performer with NDR Big Band in Hamburg.

France was invited to perform with the ASKO Ensemble, BBC Big Band, BBC Concert Orchestra, BBC National Orchestra of Wales, BBC Philharmonic, Bergen Big Band, Britten Sinfonia, DR Big Band, Duisburg Philharmonic, hr-Bigband, Royal Liverpool Philharmonic, City of London Sinfonia, London Sinfonietta, London Symphony Orchestra, Luxembourg Philharmonic Orchestra, MDR Leipzig Radio Symphony Orchestra, Royal Scottish National Orchestra, and WDR Symphony Orchestra Cologne.

He worked with Eivind Aarset, Leo Abrahams, Arild Andersen, Victor Bailey, Django Bates, David Binney, Liane Carroll, Elvis Costello, Palle Danielsson, John Dankworth, Sidsel Endresen, Paul Englishby, Mark Feldman, Mike Gibbs, Tim Harries, Arve Henriksen, Charles Hazlewood, Dave Holland, Marc Johnson, John Paul Jones, Anders Jormin, Lee Konitz, Joe Lovano, Joanna MacGregor, Charlie Mariano, Claire Martin, Bob Mintzer, Nils Petter Molvær, Evan Parker, Jason Rebello, Adam Rogers, Maria Schneider, Gwilym Simcock, J. Peter Schwalm, John Surman, Steve Swallow, June Tabor, Ralph Towner, Stephen Warbeck, Bugge Wesseltoft, Kenny Wheeler, Norma Winstone, and Yazz Ahmed.

France died after a long illness at home, on 5 September 2024, at the age of 60.
