= 2015 in Swedish music =

The following is a list of notable events and releases of the year 2015 in Swedish music.

== Events ==
=== February ===
- 7 – The first semi-final of Melodifestivalen was arranged. The three next semi-finals took place on February 14, 21, and 28.

=== March ===
- 7 – The Melodifestivalen second chance took place on March 7.
- 14 – The final of Melodifestivalen was carried out on March 14, 2015. Måns Zelmerlöw's song "Heroes" won the competition.

=== April ===
- 25 – Gamlestaden Jazzfestival started in Gothenburg (April 25 – May 2).

=== May ===
- 23 - Måns Zelmerlöw wins the Eurovision Song Contest 2015 for Sweden with his song "Heroes". It goes on to top the charts in Sweden, Greece, Iceland and Poland.

=== June ===
- 4 – The Malmö Live venue is officially inaugurated in Sweden; it becomes the new home of the Malmö Symphony Orchestra.
- 25 – The 3rd Bråvalla Festival opened near Norrköping (June 25–27).

=== October ===
- 12 – The 30th Stockholm International Composer Festival opens at the Stockholms Konserthus, focusing on the work of Lili and Nadia Boulanger.

=== December ===
- 11 – The 27 years old Martin Almgren won the final of Sweden's Idol series.

== Album and singles releases ==
=== January ===
Day	Album	Artist	Label	Notes	Ref.
30	Pinball	Marius Neset with Ivo Neame, Petter Eldh, and Anton Eger	ACT Music	Produced by Marius Neset and Anton Eger	

=== February ===
Day	Album	Artist	Label	Notes	Ref.
17	Picture You	The Amazing with Reine Fiske	Partisan Records		

=== March ===
Day	Album	Artist	Label	Notes	Ref.
6	Trees Of Light	Anders Jormin / Lena Willemark / Karin Nakagawa	ECM Records	Produced by Manfred Eicher	
22	Hit The Wall!	Mats Gustafsson together with Thurston Moore	Smalltown Superjazzz		
23	Lucidity	Atomic	Jazzland Recordings	Produced by Atomic, co-producer Sten Nilsen	
27	Young At Heart	Ida Sand	ACT Music	Produced by Nils Landgren, executive producer Siggi Loch	

=== May ===
Day	Album	Artist	Label	Notes	Ref.
19	Firehouse	Gard Nilssen's Acoustic Unity with Petter Eldh and André Roligheten	Clean Feed		

=== August ===
Day	Album	Artist	Label	Notes	Ref.
21	Silver Mountain	Elephant9 with Reine Fiske	Rune Grammofon		
28	Just The Two Of Us	Cæcilie Norby and Lars Danielsson	ACT Music		

=== September ===
Day	Album	Artist	Label	Notes	Ref.
25	Allas Sak	Dungen	Smalltown Supersound		
25	Postcard from a Painted Lady	Kikki Danielsson	Lionheart/Universal	Produced by Sören Karlsson	

=== October ===
Day	Album	Artist	Label	Notes	Ref.
23	Redo att gå Sönder	Bo Kaspers Orkester	Columbia		

=== November ===
Day	Album	Artist	Label	Notes	Ref.
27	Melt	Brian Chippendale / Mats Gustafsson / Massimo Pupillo	Trost		

== Deaths ==
July

- 13 – Bengt-Arne Wallin, Swedish composer, arrangeur, trumpeter, and flugelhornist (born 1926).

November

- 5 – Kjell Öhman, jazz pianist, hammond organist, and accordionist prostate cancer(born 1943)

December

- 22 – Peter Lundblad, singer of "Ta mig till havet" (prostate cancer)(born 1950).

== See also ==
- Sweden in the Eurovision Song Contest 2015
- List of number-one singles and albums in Sweden (see 2015 section on page)
