= Birds (Marius Neset album) =

Studio album by Marius Neset
- Released: March 25, 2013
- Recorded: The Village Recording, April, 2012
- Genre: Contemporary jazz
- Length: 54:23
- Label: Edition Records
- Producers: Marius Neset, Anton Eger

Marius Neset chronology
Neck of the Woods (2012)	Birds (2013)	Lion (2014)

Birds (released March 25, 2013 in Oslo, Norway by the label Edition Records – EDN1040) is the 4th album of the Norwegian saxophonist Marius Neset.

== Critical reception ==
Professional ratings
Review scores
Source	Rating
The Guardian	5/5 stars
Dagbladet	6/6 stars
Verdens Gang	5/6 stars
The Jazz Mann	4.5/5 stars

The review by Neil Spencer of the British newspaper The Guardian awarded the album 5 stars, the review by Terje Mosnes of the Norwegian newspaper Dagbladet awarded the album dice 6, the review by Carl Petter Opsahk of the Norwegian newspaper Verdens Gang awarded the album dice 5, and the reviewer Ian Mann of the Jazz Mann awarded the album 4.5 stars

According to Mosnes, with this album, Neset takes further steps on his way to the Jazz sky. The album is considered by many to be brilliant and the musical skills of this band are considered well. Many people look forward to future albums.

NRK Jazz critique Erling Wicklund, in his review of Neset's album Birds states:

... The album's title and opening track Birds is one of the funniest tunes I've heard - a frantic but through structured rhythm chaos of a remarkable ensemble where flute, accordion and tuba are capped off by Nesets increasingly ecstatic tenor sax. And so across the great symphonic pensive, before tenor saxophonist reconnects with acrobatic leaps in a musical boxing match ...

BBC Music critique Peter Marsh, in his review of Neset's album Birds states:

... Possessed of a big, supercharged sound on the tenor, astonishing control and a steady stream of ideas, Neset shapes confident, pushy and questing solos over the fleet, pin-sharp playing of the rhythm section...

== Track listing ==
No.	Title	Length
1.	"Birds"	10:53
2.	"Reprise"	3:27
3.	"Boxing"	7:00
4.	"Portuguese Windmill"	7:49
5.	"Spring Dance"	2:30
6.	"Fields of Club"	5:24
7.	"The Place of Welcome"	4:36
8.	"Introduction to Sacred Universe"	1:46
9.	"Math of Mars"	5:02
10.	"Fanfare"	5:56

All compositions by Marius Neset except tracks # 6 & 7 by Marius Neset/Anton Eger

== Personnel ==
Band quintet

- Marius Neset - tenor & soprano saxophones
- Ivo Neame - piano & additional keyboards (tracks # 3,6)
- Jim Hart - vibes
- Jasper Høiby - double bass
- Anton Eger - drums & percussion

Additional musicians

- Ingrid Neset - flute (tracks # 1,5,6,9,11) & piccolo flute (tracks # 1,9,11)
- Bjarke Mogensen - accordion (tracks # 1,9,11)
- Tobias Viklund - trumpet (tracks # 1,2,10,11)
- Ronny Farsund - trumpet (tracks # 1,2,10,11)
- Peter Jensen - trombone (tracks # 1,2,10,11)
- Lasse Mauritzen - French horn (tracks # 1,2,10,11)
- Daniel Herskedal - tuba (tracks # 1,2,10,11)

== Credits ==
- Recorded by August Wanngren in the Village Recording, April, 2012
- Mixed by August Wanngren in Wee Know Music Studios
- Masered by Thomas Eberger at Stockholm Mastering
- Front cower photo by Kiram Ridley
- Additional photo by Linnea Høyby & Roald Vestad
- Produced by Marius Neset & Anton Eger

== Notes ==
- This record is supported by the Danish Musician Union & Coda
