= Pinball (Marius Neset album) =

Studio album by Marius Neset
- Released: 30 January 2015
- Recorded: The Village Recording, September 2015
- Genre: Contemporary jazz
- Length: 1:02:03
- Label: ACT Music
- Producers: Marius Neset and Anton Eger

Marius Neset chronology
Lion (2014)	Pinball (2015)	Snowmelt (2016)

Pinball (released 30 January 2015 in Germany by the label ACT Music – ACT 9032-2) is the 6th album of the Norwegian saxophonist Marius Neset.

== Background ==
Neset and his comusicians here presents a shimmering kaleidoscopic album of different expressions and influences, and delight with compositional and instrumental complexity. At the same time, Neset sounds more mature, soulful and melodic than ever before.

== Critical reception ==
Professional ratings
Review scores
Source	Rating
All About Jazz	5/5 stars
The Guardian	5/5 stars
The Irish Times	4/5 stars

The All About Jazz reviewer John Kelman awarded the album 4.5 stars and the review by Ian Patterson of the British newspaper The Guardian awarded the album 4 stars, The Irish Times reviewer Cormac Larkin awarded the album 4 stars.

The Guardian critique Ian Patterson, in his review of Neset's album Pinball states:

... The folk and world-music sweep of its snaking melodies, the subtlety of its tonal contrasts and its mix of intensity and insinuation make Pinball another step-change in Neset’s already spectacular career ...

== Track listing ==
No.	Title	Length
1.	"World Song Part 1" (Composed by Marius Neset)	8:45
2.	"World Song Part 2" (Composed by Marius Neset)	6:24
3.	"Pinball" (Composed by Marius Neset)	6:51
4.	"Odes of You" (Composed by Marius Neset and Anton Eger)	6:52
5.	"Police" (Composed by Marius Neset)	6:09
6.	"Music for Cello and Saxophone" (Composed by Marius Neset and Anton Eger)	3:18
7.	"Theatre of Magic" (Composed by Marius Neset and Anton Eger)	6:26
8.	"Aberhonddu" (Composed by Marius Neset and Anton Eger)	3:33
9.	"Jaguar" (Composed by Marius Neset and Anton Eger)	2:53
10.	"Music for Drums and Saxophone" (Composed by Marius Neset and Anton Eger)	2:19
11.	"Summer Dance" (Composed by Marius Neset)	5:59
12.	"Hymn from the World" (Composed by Marius Neset)	1:44

== Personnel ==
Band quintet

- Marius Neset - tenor and soprano saxophones
- Ivo Neame - piano, Hammond B3 organ, CP 80, clavinet
- Jim Hart - vibraphone and marimba, additional drums (track: #4)
- Petter Eldh - double bass
- Anton Eger - drums and percussion

Additional musicians

- Andreas Brantelid - cello (tracks: #1, 2, 6 and 7)
- Rune Tonsgaard Sørensen - violin (tracks: #1 and 11
- Ingrid Neset - flute (tracks: #1, 5 and 11)
- August Wanngren - tambourine (track: #3)
- Pinball band - clapping (tracks: #1, 2 & 7)

== Credits ==
- Recorded by Henning Vatne Svoren at Ocean Sound Recordings, 30 June - 2 July 2014
- Mixed by August Wanngren at We Know Music Studios
- Mastered by Thomas Eberger at Stockholm Mastering
- Artwork by Rune Mortensen
- Cover photo by Lisbeth Holten
- Produced by Marius Neset and Anton Eger
