= Suite for the Seven Mountains =

Studio album by Marius Neset
- Released: September 8, 2008
- Recorded: 2008
- Genre: Jazz
- Length: 56:44
- Label: Edition, Calibrated Records
- Producer: Marius Neset & Anton Eger

Marius Neset chronology
Suite for the Seven Mountains (2008)	Golden Xplosion (2011)

Suite for the Seven Mountains (released April 15, 2008 in UK by the label Edition Records – CALI074CD) is the debut album of the Norwegian saxophonist Marius Neset and his «People Are Machines».

Professional ratings
Review scores
Source	Rating
Marlbank.net	4/5 stars
Bergens Tidende	4/6 stars

== Reception ==
The review by the Marlbank.net awarded the album 4 stars, and the reviewer Erik Steinskog of the Norwegian newspaper Bergens Tidende awarded the album 4 stars (dice).

== Review ==
The debut album of the Norwegian saxophonist Marius Neset is a suite for jazz quartet and string quartet. Neset give us an elevated chamber music experience including seven movements with consistently strong compositions

Kirkemusikki Bergen in the review of Neset's album Suite For The Seven Mountains states:

... Suite for the seven mountains was his first solo release and is a very successful crossover composition written for jazz quartet and string quintet with a classical chamber music expression...

== Track listing ==
No.	Title	Length
1.	"I"	3:09
2.	"II"	6:46
3.	"III"	1:53
4.	"IV"	3:21
5.	"V"	12:41
6.	"VI"	3:04
7.	"VII"	15:50

All compositions by Marius Neset

== Personnel ==
People Are Machines

- Marius Neset - tenor & soprano saxophones
- Magnus Hjorth - piano
- Petter Eldh - double bass
- Anton Eger - drums

Additional string quartet

- Patricia Mia Andersen - violin
- Karen Johanne Pedersen - violin
- Andreas Birk - viola
- Christoffer Ohlsson - cello
