= Neck of the Woods (Daniel Herskedal and Marius Neset album) =

Studio album by Marius Neset and Daniel Herskedal
- Released: August 27, 2012
- Recorded: by August Wanngren at Fredriksberg Church in Copenhagen, December, 2012, Kulturskolan in Lund, February, 2011, & We Know Music Studios in Copenhagen June, 2011 and May 2012
- Genre: Contemporary jazz
- Length: 54:23
- Label: Edition
- Producer: Marius Neset, Daniel Herskedal

Marius Neset chronology
Golden Xplosion (2011)	Neck of the Woods (2012)	Birds (2013)

Neck of the Woods (released Aug 27, 2012 in Oslo, Norway by the label Edition Records – EDN1034 is an album by the Norwegian saxophonist Marius Neset together with the tubaist Daniel Herskedal.

Professional ratings
Review scores
Source	Rating
Dagbladet	4/6 stars
The Guardian	3/5 stars
The Jazz Mann	4/5 stars

== Reception ==
The review by Terje Mosnes of the Norwegian newspaper Dagbladet awarded the album 4 stars (dice), the review by John Fordham of the British newspaper The Guardian awarded the album 3 stars, and the reviewer Ian Mann of the Jazz Mann awarded the album 4 stars

== Review ==
The album Neck of the Woods is an album that increases its appeal with repeated listening. Neset and Herskedal guides us into a mysterious brass landscape that is rich of surprises.

The critique Terje Mosnes of the Norwegian newspaper Dagbladet, in his review of Neset's album Neck of the Woods states:

... the album is terms of tone and phrasing an ocean of pleasure, and an original example of how agree musician's mind and vast technical skills can get basically very different sounding instruments to sound like a lot of timbral and exciting whole ...

The Guardian critique John Fordham, in his review of the album Neck of the Woods states:

... Both these young artists are already instrumental masters,...

The All About Jazz critique Ian Patterson, in his review of the album Neck of the Woods states:

... Herskedal and Neset—former students of Copenhagen's Rhythmic Conservatory and band mates in pianist Django Bates StoRMChaser—have, however, crafted music so sublime that it's a wonder tubiasts and saxophonists aren't a dime-a-dozen. Drawing from the Norwegian folk tradition and classically influenced European church music, the result is a recording that has the haunting quality of sacred music while also carrying a vein of pastoral roots music. The judicious use of vocals in the form of tenor Hallvar Djupvik, and the 20-piece all-male Svanholm Singers choir adds to the music's ethereal and often devotional nature...

== Track listing ==
All compositions by Daniel Herskedal & Marius Neset except where other are noted

1. Neck Of The Woods (5:33)
2. Preludium (2:27)
3. Lutra Lutra (2:50)
4. Eg Er Framand (5:54) - traditional
5. The Shepherd (0:59)
6. Ara's Dance (4:24)
7. The Christmas Song (4:32)
8. Dragon's Eye (2:53)
9. Introduction To Swan Island (1:56)
10. Swan Island (5:21)
11. The Wedding (4:00) - composed by Abdullah Ibrahim

== Personnel ==
- Marius Neset - saxophone
- Daniel Herskedal - tuba

Additional musicians

- Hallvar Djupvik - vocal solo (track # 4)
- Svanholm Singers - choir

== Credits ==
- Recorded by August Wanngren
- Mixed & Masered by August Wanngren
- Design & cower photo by Darren Rumney
- Additional photo by Enok Holsegård
- Produced by Marius Neset & Daniel Herskedal
- Executive producer Dave Stapleton

== Notes ==
Recorded at

- Fredriksberg Kirke (Copenhagen, DK) December 2010
- Kulturskolan I Lund (Lund, SE) February 2011
- We Know Music Studios (Copenhagen, DK) June 2011 and May 2012

Mixed and mastered in

- We Know Music Studios
