= Kairos 4Tet =

Jazz quartet

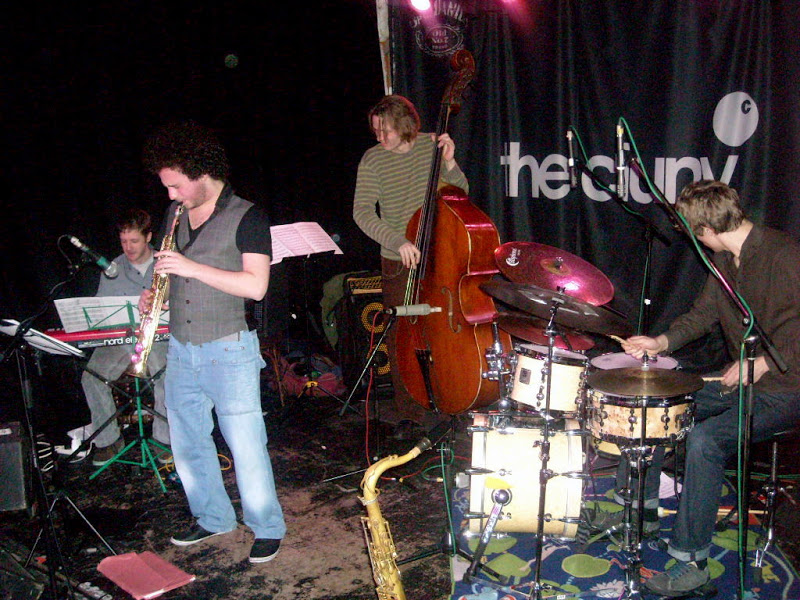
- Kairos 4Tet playing in London in 2010

Background information
- Origin: United Kingdom
- Genre: Jazz
- Years active: 2010–present
- Labels: Edition, A Remarkable Idea
- Members: Adam Waldmann; Ivo Neame; Jon Scott; Jasper Høiby
- Website: kairos4tet.com

Kairos 4Tet is a British jazz quartet founded in 2010. The band is led by Adam Waldmann on saxophone, Ivo Neame on keyboards and synthesizers, Jon Scott on drums, and Jasper Høiby on bass guitar. (Neame and Høiby are also associated with the trio Phronesis.)

== History ==
The band's name derives from an ancient Greek word meaning "the right". Waldmann has studied with Julian Arguelles and Yuri Honing, and has worked with Alicia Keys, Mark Ronson, Mark Guiliana, Alan Hampton, Paloma Faith, Omar Lye-Fook & Tinie Tempah. In 2010 Waldmann formed the band, and they released Kairos 4tet's debut album Kairos Moment. In 2013, the band performed live from Maida Vale Studios on Jamie Cullum's BBC Radio 2 show.

== Awards and honors ==
In 2011, the band signed to Edition and won a MOBO Award for Best Jazz Act. In 2014 they were nominated for the Jazz Ensemble of the Year at the UK's Parliamentary Jazz Awards run by the All Party Parliamentary Jazz Appreciation Group In 2011, their second release, Statement of Intent, was voted no. 2 in Mojo magazine's albums of the year and led to them winning the MOBO Award for Best Jazz Act.

== Discography ==
- Kairos Moment (Kairos, 2000)
- Statement of Intent (Edition)
- Everything We Hold (Naim, 2013)
