= Golden Xplosion =

Studio album by Marius Neset
- Released: April 15, 2011
- Recorded: April 2010
- Studio: The Village Recording
- Genre: Free Jazz
- Length: 47:26
- Label: Edition Records
- Producer: Marius Neset, Anton Eger

Marius Neset chronology
Suite For The Seven Mountains (2008)	Golden Xplosion (2011)	Neck of the Woods (2012)

Golden Xplosion (released April 15, 2011 in UK by the label Edition Records – EDN1027) is the second album of the Norwegian saxophonist Marius Neset.

Professional ratings
Review scores
Source	Rating
The Guardian	5/5 stars
The Telegraph	5/5 stars

== Reception ==
The review by John Fordham of the British newspaper The Guardian awarded the album 5 stars, and the reviewer Ivan Hewett of the British newspaper The Telegraph awarded the album 5 stars

== Review ==
This is a remarkable album by the now 25 years old Norwegian saxophonist Marius Neset. Together with the three companion musicians centered by Django Bates, the brilliant compositions and the excess energy of the band gives the album an elevated expression.

The Guardian critique John Fordham, in his review of Neset's album Golden Xplosion states:

... Marius Neset (...) has a vision that makes all 11 originals on this sensational album feel indispensable, and indispensably connected to each other.
Bonuses include an inspired Bates on piano and synths, and the formidable Phronesis rhythm section of bassist Jasper Høiby and drummer Anton Eger...

The Telegraph critique Ivan Hewett, in his review of Neset's album Golden Xplosion states:

... Twenty-five-year-old saxophonist Marius Neset is a marvel. He makes his instrument dance like a gazelle and soar like an eagle, and he’s an ingenious composer too.
On the title track he hurls together three different time-signatures, amusingly shouted out just in case we get lost.
But this isn’t mere cleverness, it’s instinctive musicality, buoyed up by three other fine players....

== Track listing ==
All compositions by Marius Neset except when otherwise noted

1. «Introducing: Golden Xplosion» (2:01)
2. «Golden Xplosion» (5:26)
3. «City On Fire» (7:42)
4. «Sane» (3:48)
5. «Old Poison (XL)» (2:18)
6. «Shame Us» (6:32) - composed by Marius Neset & Anton Eger
7. «Saxophone Intermezzo» (2:57) - composed by Marius Neset & Daniel Davidsen
8. «The Real YSJ» (2:43)
9. «Saxophone Intermezzo II» (2:22)
10. «Angel Of The North» (8:20)
11. «Epilogue» (3:27)

== Personnel ==
Band quartet

- Marius Neset - tenor & soprano saxophones
- Django Bates - piano, keyboards, E-flat horn & trumpet
- Jasper Høiby - double bass
- Anton Eger - drums

== Credits ==
- Recorded by August Wanngren in the Village Recording, January 26–27, 2010
- Mixed by August Wanngren in Wee Know Music Studios
- Masered by Thomas Eberger at Stockho
- Front cower photo by Siv-Anne Skogen
- Additional photo by Tim Dickeson & Dave Stapleton
- Artwork Design by Dave Stapleton
- Produced by Marius Neset (track # 1,5,7,8,9,11), Marius Neset & Anton Eger (track # 2,3,4,6,10)
- Executive roduceer Dave Stapleton

== Notes ==
- This record is supported by the Danish Musician Union
