= Lion (Marius Neset album) =

Live album by Marius Neset
- Released: April 25, 2014
- Recorded: The Village Recording, September 2013
- Genre: Contemporary jazz
- Length: 1:23:19
- Label: ACT Music ACT 9031-2
- Producer: Marius Neset and Trondheim Jazz Orchestra

Marius Neset chronology
Birds (2013)	Lion (2014)	Pinball (2015)

Lion (released April 25, 2014 in Germany under the ACT Music label) is the fifth album by Norwegian saxophonist Marius Neset, made in collaboration with the Trondheim Jazz Orchestra.

== Background ==
Neset originally received a commission in 2011 to compose for the orchestra's forthcoming concert at the 2012 Moldejazz Festival. After its premiere in Molde, he decided to make a recording of the work and continue to use it for further concerts.

== Critical reception ==
Professional ratings
Review scores
Source	Rating
All About Jazz	4.5/5 stars
The Guardian	4/5 stars
The Arts Desk	4/5 stars

The All About Jazz reviewer John Kelman awarded the album 4.5 stars, and both John Fordham of the British newspaper The Guardian and reviewer Matthew Wright at The Arts Desk gave 4 stars.

The London Jazz News critic Eric Ford, in his review of Neset's album Lion wrote:

... The flow between duo, trio, solo and all other sections is exceedingly well-orchestrated and just sweeps you along from one surprise to the next ...

== Track listing ==
No.	Title	Length
1.	"Lion"	10:17
2.	"Golden Xplosion"	7:31
3.	"In the Ring"	7:31
4.	"Interlude"	0:55
5.	"Sacred Universe"	10:10
6.	"Weight of the World"	7:56
7.	"Raining"	8:17
8.	"Birds"	11:29

All compositions by Marius Neset

== Personnel ==
- Marius Neset – tenor and soprano saxophones
- Hanna Paulsberg – tenor saxophone
- Peter Fuglsang – alto saxophone, flute and clarinet
- Eirik Hegdal – baritone and soprano saxophones
- Eivind Lønning – trumpet
- Erik Eilertsen – trumpet
- Erik Johannesen – trombone
- Daniel Herskedal – tuba
- Jovan Pavlovic – accordion
- Espen Berg – piano
- Petter Eldh – bass
- Gard Nilssen – drums, percussion, and others
- Ingrid Neset – additional flute and piccolo flute (tracks 5 and 8)

== Credits ==
- Music composed and arranged by Marius Neset
- Recorded by August Wanngren at The Village Recording, September 2013
- Mixed by August Wanngren at We Know Music Studios
- Mastered by Thomas Eberger at Stockholm Mastering
- Artwork by Siggi Loch and Jutta Stolte
- Front cover photo by Lutz Voigtländer
- Produced by Marius Neset and Trondheim Jazz Orchestra
