= Vula Viel =

Jazz group from London

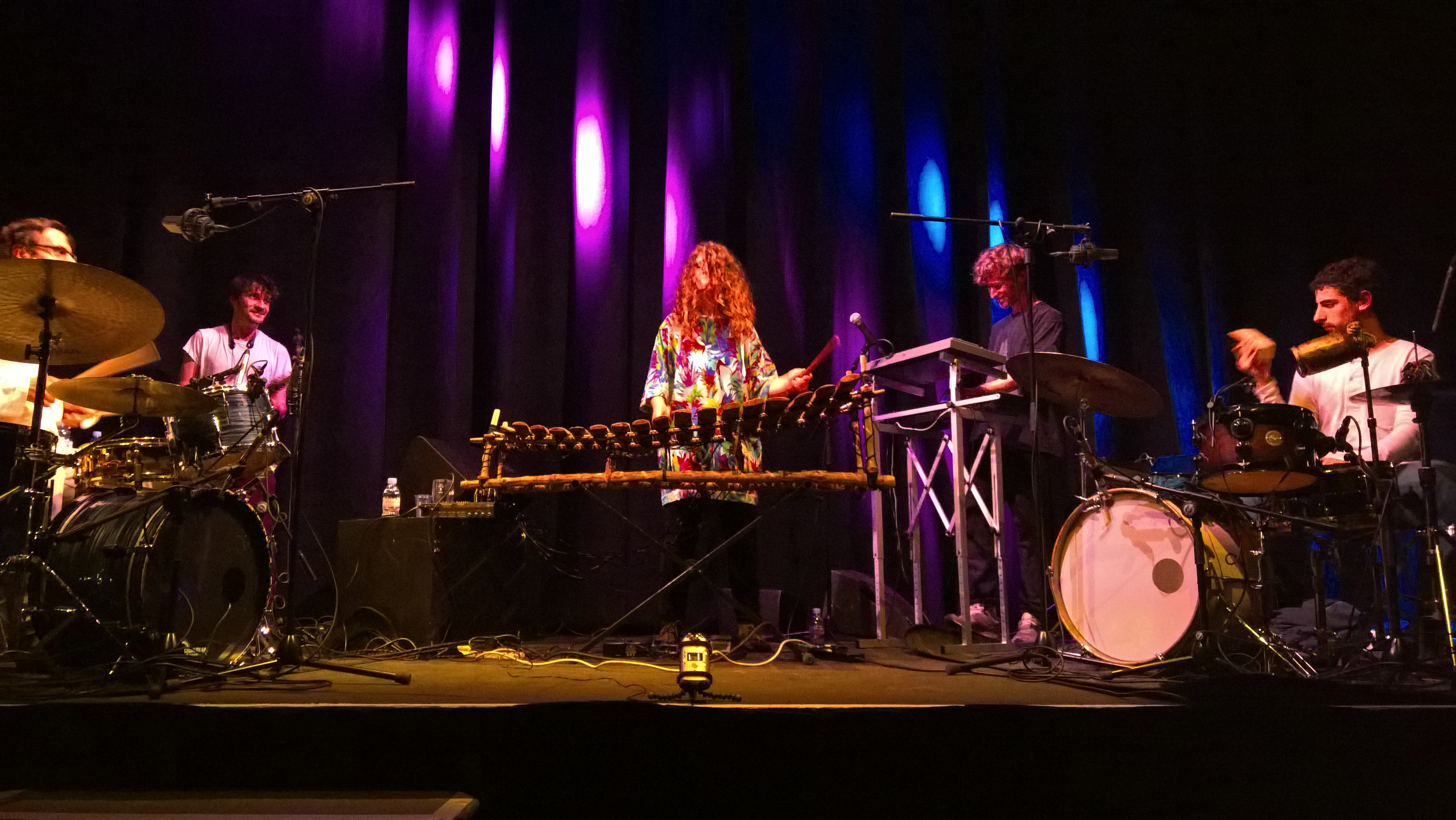
- Vula Viel performing at the 2016 Songlines Festival

Background information
- Origin: London and Upper West Region of Ghana
- Genres: Jazz, Ghanaian, electronica, minimal
- Years active: 2011–present
- Labels: Independent
- Members: Bex Burch (gyil); Ruth Goller (bass); Jim Hart (drums)
- Past members: Dan Nicholls; Dave De Rose; George Crowley; Simon Ross
- Website: bexburch.com

Bex Burch's Vula Viel is a jazz group from London, playing music based on the sound of the gyil, a wooden xylophone from West Africa, fused with elements of electronica and minimal music. The group was formed by Bex Burch, a musician from Yorkshire. Burch trained in percussion at the Guildhall School of Music and Drama, where she was introduced to the minimalist music of Steve Reich, and then spent three years with the Dagaaba people of the Upper West Region of Ghana. There she learned music and xylophone making as the apprentice of a master xylophonist Thomas Sekgura before returning to the United Kingdom and forming Vula Viel. The name Vula Viel was given to Burch on the completion of her apprenticeship, and means "Good is Good" in the Dagaaba language, Dagaare.

== Good Is Good (2015) ==
In October 2015 the group released their first album, Good is Good, which received plaudits from The Guardian, the Financial Times, the London Evening Standard, Songlines, and Jazzwise. In November 2015 the band performed at the London Jazz Festival at Ronnie Scott's Jazz Club, leading The Guardian to describe them as "the unexpected stars of a glitzy show". In April 2016 Iggy Pop played the band's music on BBC Radio 6, describing it as "Beautiful... dance to it, make love to it, consume it, listen to it, stare at the clouds to it.... That music deserves good reactions!"

== Do Not Be Afraid (2019) ==
In 2018 Burch reformed Vula Viel from the original five piece to a trio consisting of Burch, bassist Ruth Goller (Acoustic Ladyland, Melt Yourself Down) and Jim Hart (Marius Neset Quintet, Velvet Revolution) on drums. The trio's first release was 2019's Do Not Be Afraid with guest artists Gwyneth Herbert and Rozie Gyems. While Good is Good consisted of reworkings of traditional Dagaare music, Do Not Be Afraid saw Burch composing new pieces based on Dagaare fundamentals.

== What's Not Enough About That (2020) ==
Vula Viel's next album What's Not Enough About That featuring Peter Zummo was released in 2020 just as COVID-19 was shutting down live music. Reviewing the live album launch, The Wire said "the music rolls and motors with irresistible momentum... there’s plenty enough about this." Gilles Peterson selected What's Not Enough as one of his Albums of the week on his BBC Radio 6 Music show exclaiming, "Hang on this is really good" and inviting Vula Viel to perform live on his show 14 March 2020. The album received further excellent reviews from Jazzlines, Songlines, Written in Music and was selected as an Album of the Month by the Guardian.
