= Saluting Sgt. Pepper =

Studio album by Django Bates and the Frankfurt Radio Big Band
- Released: 7 July 2017
- Recorded: October 2016
- Studio: Horfunkstudio II; Hessischer Rundfunk, Frankfurt
- Genre: Jazz; rock; pop; psychedelia; art rock
- Length: 45:17
- Label: Edition Records; EDN1094
- Producer: Django Bates; Tim Adnitt

Django Bates chronology
The Study of Touch (2016)	Saluting Sgt. Pepper (2017)	Tenacity (2020)

Professional ratings
Review scores
Source	Rating
The Guardian	4/5 stars
The Times	3/5 stars
All About Jazz	4.5/5 stars
DownBeat	4/4 stars

Saluting Sgt. Pepper is an album by the composer, multi-instrumentalist and band leader Django Bates with the Frankfurt Radio Big Band, which was released by Edition Records in 2017. The album was commissioned by the Frankfurt Radio Big Band to mark the 50th anniversary of the release of The Beatles's Sgt. Pepper's Lonely Hearts Club Band, which is the UK’s best-selling studio album as of 2020. The recording also features the Danish group, Eggs Laid By Tigers and the multi-instrumentalist Stuart Hall. It was performed live at Deutsches Jazzfestival Frankfurt and at Ronnie Scott's Jazz Club in 2016.

== Reception ==
In his review for The Guardian, Dave Gelly wrote: "Somebody was bound to give the Beatles’ magnum opus a jazz makeover on its 50th birthday, and I can't think of anyone better than Django Bates to do it. He has just the right mixture of musicality, mischief and sheer cheek to bring it off".

In The Times, John Bungey stated that "Bates keeps closely to the melodic outline of Pepper’s 13 tracks, but tinkers energetically with textures and sometimes tempo in his arrangements for the Frankfurt Big Band. From the clever dropped beats of the opener, it’s as if the Lonely Hearts Club Band has evolved into a crack ensemble tutored on old Loose Tubes albums".

In his review for All About Jazz, Roger Farbey made special mention of Eggs Laid By Tigers vocalist Martin Dahl, who was "charged with the unenviable task of singing all the lead vocal parts". He also highlighted that "multi-instrumentalist Stuart Hall, and a long-time associate of Bates, made vital contributions to the album".

== Track listing ==
All songs written by Lennon–McCartney, except "Within You Without You" by George Harrison.

1. "Sgt. Pepper's Lonely Hearts Club Band" – 1:56
2. "With a Little Help from My Friends" – 2:47
3. "Lucy in the Sky with Diamonds" – 3:48
4. "Getting Better" – 3:59
5. "Fixing a Hole" – 3:20
6. "She's Leaving Home" – 3:39
7. "Being for the Benefit of Mr. Kite!" – 2:33
8. "Within You Without You" – 5:46
9. "When I'm Sixty-Four" – 2:51
10. "Lovely Rita" – 2:59
11. "Good Morning Good Morning" – 2:48
12. "Sgt. Pepper's Lonely Hearts Club Band (Reprise)" – 2:16
13. "A Day in the Life" – 6:35

== Personnel ==
- Django Bates – keyboard, backing vocals, arranger, conductor (solos on tracks 5 and 10)
- Stuart Hall – electric guitar, acoustic guitar, lap steel, electric sitar, violin (solos on tracks 8 and 12)

Eggs Laid By Tigers

- Martin Ullits Dahl – lead vocal
- Jonas Westergaard – electric bass, backing vocals
- Peter Brunn – drums, percussion, backing vocals

Frankfurt Radio Big Band

- Heinz-Dieter Sauerborn – soprano saxophone, flute, clarinet (solo on track 12)
- Oliver Leicht – alto saxophone, flute, clarinet, alto clarinet
- Tony Lakatos – tenor saxophone, flute (solos on tracks 2, 3 and 4)
- Steffen Weber – tenor saxophone, alto flute, bass clarinet
- Rainer Heute – baritone saxophone, bass saxophone, bass clarinet, contra alto clarinet
- Frank Wellert – trumpet
- Thomas Vogel – trumpet
- Martin Auer – trumpet, flugelhorn
- Axel Schlosser – trumpet, flugelhorn
- Günter Bollmann – trombone
- Peter Feil – trombone
- Christian Jaksjø – trombone
- Jan Schreiner – bass trombone
- Martin Scales – guitar (solo on track 5)
