= Svanholm Singers =

Swedish choir

- Choir
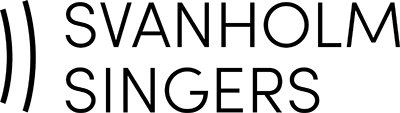
- Origin: Lund, Sweden
- Founded: 1998
- Founder: Eva Svanholm Bohlin
- Genre: Classical, Folk music
- Members: 20
- Music director: Sofia Söderberg
- Chief conductor: Sofia Söderberg
- Website: www.svanholmsingers.se

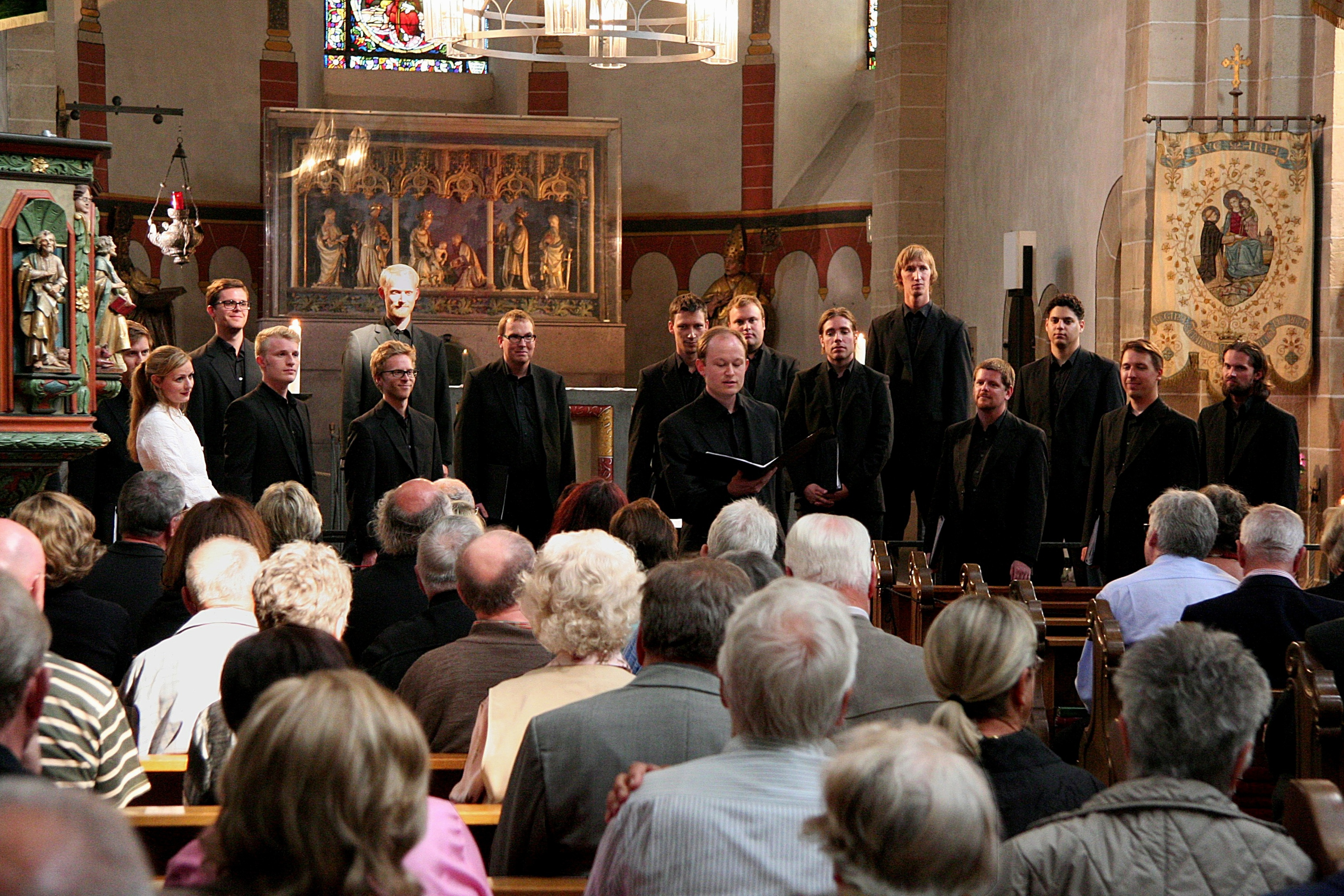
Svanholm Singers with conductor Sofia Söderberg (left) in Treis-Karden, 2008

Svanholm Singers is an internationally acclaimed Swedish male-voice chamber choir founded in 1998 and based in Lund. It comprises around 20 singers, most of whom between 20 and 30 years of age. The choir is led by conductor Sofia Söderberg, and is known for its precise intonation, tonal focus, and vivid dynamics. Svanholm Singers performs concerts and tours mainly in Europe and Asia.

With a core repertoire centered around the Scandinavian and Baltic choral tradition, including collaborations with the Estonian composer Veljo Tormis, the choir promotes new compositions or arrangements for men's chorus. It has commissioned works by, among others, Knut Nystedt (Norway), Peter Bruun (Denmark), John Milne (USA), Arturo Salinas (Mexico), and Swedish composers Tobias Broström, Christian Engquist and Daniel Hjort. Svanholm Singers regularly commissions works by the conductor and members of the choir. In 2012, it announced the Svanholm Singers Composition Award (prize money $9,500), which attracted 46 entries from five continents.

== History ==
The choir was founded by conductor Eva Svanholm Bohlin in 1998, and named in honor of her father, the opera singer Set Svanholm. In 2001, Sofia Söderberg took over as conductor.

== Discography ==
- Svanholm Singers (1999)
- Romance (2002)
- december (2004)
- Live in Japan (2006)
- Tormis – Works for Men's Voices (2007)
- Fingerprints (2010)
- Exclusive (2019)

=== Collaborative works ===
With Marius Neset and Daniel Herskedal:

- Neck of the Woods (2012)

== Awards ==
The choir has won several awards and prizes, including Toner för miljoner (Sweden, 1998), the Takarazuka International Chamber Chorus Contest (Japan 1999), the Madetoja Festival (Finland 2005), the Concorso Internazionale di Canto Corale C. A. Seghizzi (Italy 2006), the 10th International Choir Festival “Tallinn 2007” (Estonia 2007), the LV International Habaneras and Polyphony Contest of Torrevieja (Spain 2009), the Béla Bartók International Choir Competition (Hungary 2010), and the Tolosa Choral Contest (Spain, 2016).
