= The Federal Poets =

US poetry group

The Federal Poets is a poetry group based in Washington, D.C. It is the oldest continually operating poetry group in the metro Washington D.C. area. The group aims to assist members with improving their poetry through critiques by other members, and to increase the exposure of members through readings and publication. The Federal Poets meet every third Saturday at Tenley Public Library. The group's journal, The Federal Poet, is published semiannually and consists of submissions of the best works by members.

== History ==
The Federal Poets was founded in 1944 under the name the Commerce Literary Society, at the Commerce Department. The name was soon changed to the Bookfellows Club. In 1946, the club changed its name for the final time, renaming itself as the Federal Poets. Originally, the Federal Poets only accepted people working for the federal government as members, however the group eventually extended membership to include anyone who wrote poetry. The group's members include people such as Walter Howard Kerr, who served as its treasurer, vice-president, and president. Kerr's poetry has been included in several publications, such as the Southern Poetry Review and the Red Clay Reader. Kerr was a member of other poetry societies such as the Maryland State Poetry Society, of which he was treasurer. Other members of the Federal Poets include Ingeborg Carsten-Miller who edited The Federal Poet and was the author of works such as Northern Lights (Nordlichter).
