= Anton Eger =

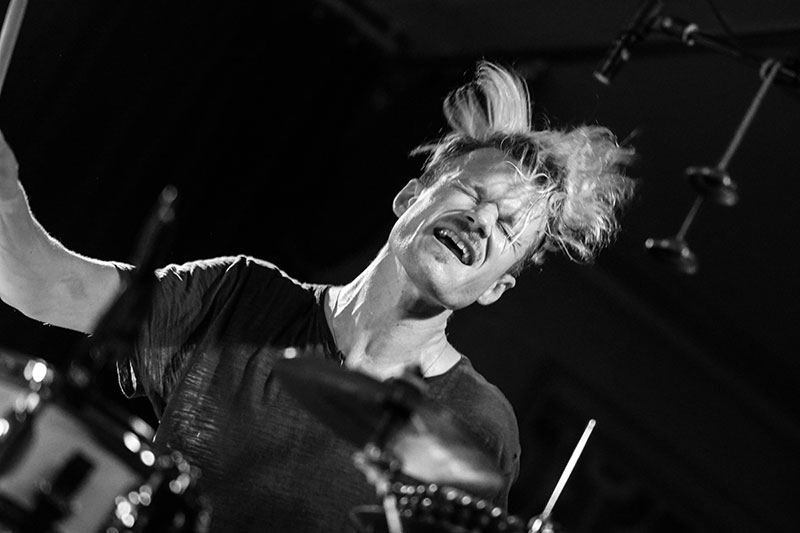
- Aarhus, Denmark 2018

Background information
- Born: 9 December 1980 (age 45); Oslo, Norway
- Genres: Jazz
- Occupations: Musician, composer
- Instrument: Drums
- Years active: 1995–present
- Labels: Stunt, Edition, SevenSeas, Loop

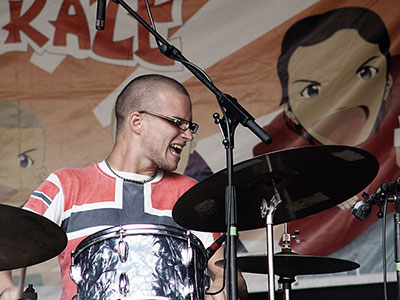

Anton Eger (born 9 December 1980) is a Norwegian-Swedish jazz drummer, known from a series of recordings and collaborations with musicians like Django Bates, Marius Neset, Daniel Heløy Davidsen, Ivo Neame, and Jasper Høiby.

== Career ==
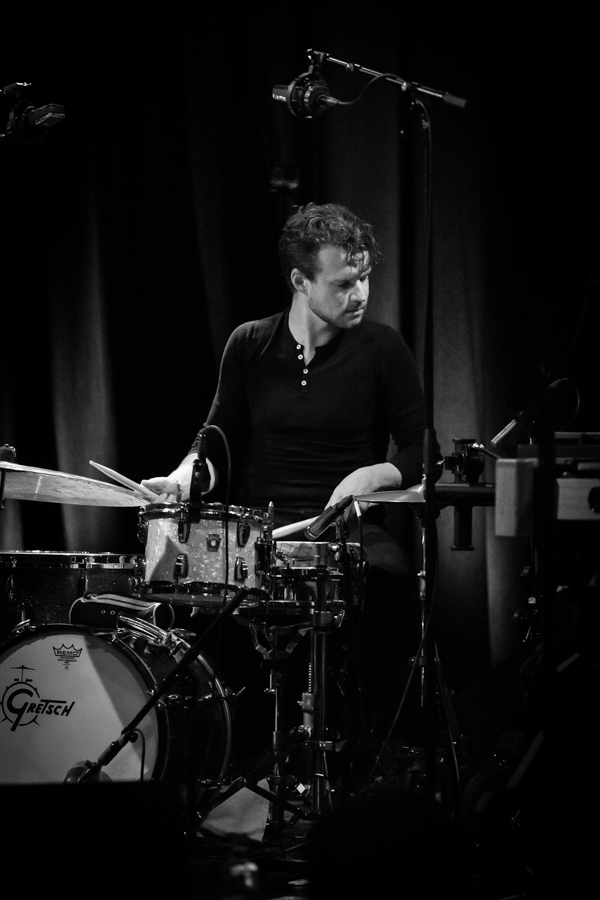
Eger at Oslo jazzfestival (2015)

Eger studied jazz at the Copenhagen Rhythmic Music Conservatory under the guidance of Django Bates among others, and played drums on Bates' album Spring is Here (Shall We Dance?) (2008). Within the Scandinavian quintet JazzKamikaze, he participates on several album releases and appeared at various international jazz festivals Kongsberg Jazzfestival, Moldejazz, North Sea Jazz Festival, Bangkok Jazz Festival, Rochester Jazz Festival, as well as being part of the opening of the annual Rio Carnival in Rio de Janeiro.

He also collaborates within the trio Phronesis with double bassist Jasper Høiby and pianist and saxophonist Ivo Neame. They have released six albums so far. Their 2010 album Alive was nominated jazz album of the year by Jazzwise and Mojo magazines.

== Awards and honors ==
- 2005: Ung Jazz Award of the JazzDanmark
- 2005: Young Nordic Jazz Comets, Mission I, within JazzKamikaze
- 2010: Album of the Year, Jazzwise, for the album Alive within Phronesis
- 2010: Album of the Year, MOJO, for the album Alive within Phronesis

== Discography ==
=== Solo albums ===
- 2019: Æ (Edition Records)

=== Collaborations ===
Within JazzKamikaze

- 2005: Mission I (Stunt Records)
- 2007: Travelling at the speed of sound (Stunt Records)
- 2008: Emerging pilots EP (SevenSeas Music)
- 2009: The revolution's in your hands EP (SevenSeas Music)
- 2010: Supersonic revolutions (SevenSeas Music)
- 2012: The return of JazzKamikaze (Stunt Records)

With Django Bates

- 2008: Spring is Here (Shall We Dance?) (Lost Marble), within StoRMChaser Big Band

With Marius Neset

- 2008: Suite for the Seven Mountains (Calibrated Records), within "People Are Machines»
- 2011: Golden Xplosion (Edition Records)
- 2013: Birds (Edition Records)

Within Phronesis,

- 2007: Organic Warfare (Loop)
- 2009: Green Delay (Loop)
- 2010: Alive (Edition Records)
- 2012: Walking Dark (Edition Records)
- 2016: Parallax (Edition Records)
- 2017: The Behemoth (Edition Records)
- 2018: We Are All (Edition Records)

With The World (Swedish trio)

- 2010 There Is An Ocean Between Us (Hoob Jazz)

With People Are Machines (Marius Neset, Petter Eldh, Magnus Hjorth)

- 2007 "People Are Machines" (Calibrated Records)
- 2008 "Live in Getxo"

With Kill Screen Music

- 2010: Us The Two-Headed Horse (Universal Music)

As featured artist

- 2012: Studio Tan (Prophone), with Per Lindvall ("Loungeloop")
