= Escapism (album) =

Studio album by Fallulah
- Released: 4 February 2013
- Genres: Indie pop; synthpop; dream pop
- Length: 48:08
- Label: Sony Music Entertainment Denmark
- Producers: Maria Apetri; The Rural; Liam Howe; James Bryan; Tore Nissen; Justin Parker

Fallulah chronology
| The Black Cat Neighborhood (2010) | Escapism (2013) |

Singles from Halcyon
- 1. "Superfishyality" Released: 8 October 2012; 2. "Dried-Out Cities" Released: 11 January 2013; 3. "Your Skin" Released: 13 May 2013

Escapism is the second studio album by the Danish recording artist Fallulah, released on 4 February 2013 by Sony Music. It was released three years after her platinum selling first album, The Black Cat Neighborhood (2010).

It debuted and peaked at number two on the Danish Album Charts.

== Release and promotion ==
Fallulah trailed the album with the release of a live recording of "He'll Break Up With You When Summer Comes" on her YouTube page on 31 May 2012. The song was made available to download as a free promotional single on her website. The Guardian called the song "excellent", commenting, "sometimes you need to strip away all the complexities and get right to the point, which is exactly what 27-year-old Dane Fallulah (or Maria Apetri to her friends and family) does." The independent music blog Kick Kick Snare said, "The track is part stunning western infused retro rock, part explosive left-field pop, all Fallulah," adding that her "brand of avant-pop, deeply influenced by her Romanian heritage and experience in gypsy dance, stands out in the sea of pop music flooding the airwaves."

A video for the first single, "Superfishyality", was released online on 7 October 2012, premiered on Politiken's website. It was released on YouTube a day later. The video was directed by Casper Balslev. Scandipop noted, "The new track arrived to much fanfare," adding, "It's that chorus which is the star of the song, and the bit that you'll be singing in your head long afterwards." An alternative director's cut of the video was released on 24 October 2012.

While promoting the album, Fallulah performed an acoustic set on the P3 radio show Smag på P3 on 21 February 2013. She sang "Dried-Out Cities" and a cover of "Wicked Game" by Chris Isaak. Later released as a stand-alone single, "Wicked Game" peaked at number 33 on the Danish singles chart on 15 March 2013.

She played at the South by Southwest Festival in Austin, Texas, on 13 March 2013. On 28 March 2013, Fallulah promoted the album in the UK for the first time as the headline artist of the Ja Ja Ja show at The Lexington in London, performing alongside Pascal Pinon and Delay Trees.

In July 2013, she appeared on the cover of the free Copenhagen Metro magazine, Metronyt. In the interview, she spoke about her desire to break through in the UK and US. "My greatest dream is to play on David Letterman's show. I have dreamed of it since I was quite small. [The UK and US] are the largest markets, and therefore it is a rather difficult task. Sometimes it's all about luck. Other times it takes hard work."

Between 30 July and 7 August 2013, Fallulah offered a free download of the Man Without Country remix of "Superfishyality" on her SoundCloud page.

=== Singles ===
"Superfishyality" was released as the album's lead single on 8 October 2012, via the on air on sale method, receiving no prior promotion. The song received substantial radio support from P3, which added it to its "Inevitable" list on the day of release. The title refers to the music industry, with which she has a love/hate relationship. Fallulah explained that the song is her "attempt to navigate in the world, which can be great but also rotten and shallow".

"Dried-Out Cities" was released as the album's second single on 11 January 2013. Its music video was delayed numerous times before being uploaded on 16 April 2013. She describes the song as being about the division between the aspiration for one's life and the eventuality of settling down and having children and taking out a large loan from the bank so that one can buy an apartment or a house.

"Your Skin" was released as the album's third single on 13 May 2013.

== Reception ==
=== Critical response ===
Professional ratings
Review scores
| Source | Rating |
|---|---|
| Berlingske | 3/6 stars |
| B.T. | 4/6 stars |
| Ekstra Bladet | 4/6 stars |
| Gaffa | 4/6 stars |
| Nya Wermlands-Tidningen | 2/5 stars |
| Politiken | 4/6 stars |

Escapism received generally positive reviews from music critics.

=== Commercial performance ===
The album debuted at number two on the Danish album charts, selling 626 copies in its first week. This was described as "a surprisingly weak start" by Ekstra Bladet, which said that the music industry crisis was to blame for its poor sales. First week sales figures for Escapism were more than 9,000 copies behind the second week of the 2013 compilation of MGP Junior, Denmark's wildly popular junior singing competition. The week also saw poor performances from all other new releases. The album fell to number nine the following week, and stayed in the top forty for five weeks.

== Track listing ==
| No. | Title | Writer(s) | Producer(s) | Length |
|---|---|---|---|---|
| 1. | "Deserted Homes" | Maria Apetri | Maria Apetri | 4:13 |
| 2. | "Mares" | Apetri, The Rural | Maria Apetri, The Rural | 3:40 |
| 3. | "Dried-Out Cities" | Apetri | Maria Apetri | 4:19 |
| 4. | "Escapism" | Apetri | Maria Apetri | 3:36 |
| 5. | "Superfishyality" | Apetri, Liam Howe | Liam Howe | 3:16 |
| 6. | "Come into My Heart" | Apetri, James Bryan | James Bryan | 4:15 |
| 7. | "Graveyard of Love" | Apetri | Liam Howe | 3:55 |
| 8. | "Dragon" | Apetri | Maria Apetri, Tore Nissen | 3:04 |
| 9. | "Your Skin" | Apetri | Maria Apetri, Tore Nissen | 3:32 |
| 10. | "13th Cigarette" | Apetri, Justin Parker | Maria Apetri, Justin Parker | 4:10 |
| 11. | "Car Window" | Apetri | Maria Apetri | 3:25 |
| 12. | "Hurricane" (Cover) (bonus track) | The Rayees | Maria Apetri | 2:59 |
| 13. | "He'll Break Up With You When Summer Comes" (bonus track) | Apetri | Maria Apetri | 3:22 |
| Total length: | | | | 48:08 |

== Personnel ==
Credits adapted from the liner notes of the CD edition of Escapism.

- Maria Apetri – vocals (all tracks); production (1–4, 6, 8–13); drums (1, 8, 9); keyboards (1–4, 8–13); handclaps (1–3, 5–12); melodica (2); synth (2); ukulele (4); tom tom (4); marimba (4); tambourine (5–7, 9, 12); percussion [Costa Rican steel tin] (6); stomps (6); drum programming (9); piano (11, 13); whistling (13)
- Johan Luth – drums (1–3, 7, 10, 11)
- August Wanngren – engineer (1, 3, 4, 11–13); additional engineer (2, 5–7, 10); arrangement (1); keyboards (1, 10–12); omnichord (1); bass (4, 11–13); trombone (4, 12); trumpet (4); guitar (10, 11, 13)
- Bjarke Falgren - violin (1, 7, 10, 11); viola (1, 7, 10, 11)
- Ingrid Søfteland Neset - flute (2, 4, 5, 7, 10); backing vocals (7)
- The Rural - keyboards (2); bass guitar (2); guitar (2); production (2)
- James Dring - engineer (3); guitar (3); keyboards (3); E-Bow (3); bass guitar (3)
- Liam Howe - guitar (5); bass guitar (5, 7); keyboards (5, 7); drum programming (5); mixing (5, 7); production (5, 7); engineer (5, 7)
- James Bryan - engineer (6); guitar (6); bass guitar (6); keyboards (6); stomps (6); drum programming (6); production (6)
- Andreas Hjorth - backing vocals (7)
- Nicholas Kingo - backing vocals (7)
- Rune Kjeldsen - backing vocals (7)
- Sophie Ziedoy - backing vocals (7)
- Morten Helborn - drums (8)
- Tore Nissen - engineer (8, 9); additional engineer (12); keyboards (8, 9); guitar (8, 9); bass guitar (8, 9); synth bass (9); production (8); glockenspiel (9); piano (9)
- Justin Parker - drums (10); engineer (10); production (10); keyboards (10); mixing (5, 7)
- Luke Herbst - drums (12); percussion (12)
- Alexander Kraglund - violin (13); viola (13)
- René Cambony - A&R
- Sara Thiemke - graphics
- Maja-Lisa Kehlet - illustration
- Frank Arkwright - mastering
- Cenzo Townshend - mixing (1–4, 6, 8–13)
- Sean Julliard - assistant mixing (1–4, 6, 8–13)
- Katrine Rorhberg - photography
- Rokas Darulis - photography

== Charts ==
| Chart (2013) | Peak position |
|---|---|
| Danish Albums Chart | 2 |

== Release history ==
| Region | Date | Format | Label |
|---|---|---|---|
| Denmark | 4 February 2013 | Digital download, CD, vinyl record | Sony Music Entertainment Denmark |
