= Phronesis (band) =

Jazz trio

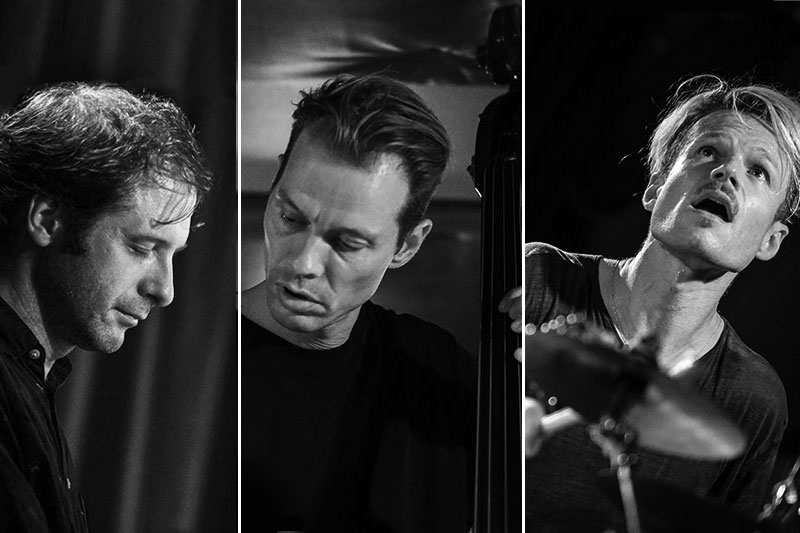
- Photo: Denmark 2018

Background information
- Origin: London Copenhagen
- Genres: Jazz
- Years active: 2005–present
- Label: Edition Records
- Members: Jasper Høiby; Ivo Neame; Anton Eger
- Website: Official site

Phronesis is a jazz trio, formed in 2005 by Danish bass player Jasper Høiby. The piano trio is completed by British pianist Ivo Neame and Swedish drummer Anton Eger. Phronesis have been described by Jazzwise magazine as "the most exciting and imaginative piano trio since e.s.t. - Esbjörn Svensson Trio". In 2017 the band was awarded Jazz Ensemble of the Year in the APPJAG (The All Party Parliamentary Jazz Appreciation Group) Parliamentary Jazz Awards.

== Biography ==
The original lineup of the band was Jasper Høiby, Magnus Hjorth and Anton Eger. Their debut release was Organic Warfare (Loop Records). The band's distinctive sound with an accent on strong melodies and propulsive grooves was audible from this first album. In 2009 Magnus Hjorth was replaced by Ivo Neame and this lineup continues. Phronesis first attracted the attention of the UK jazz press in 2009 with the release of their second album, Green Delay, receiving critical acclaim from The Guardian, John Fordham referring to their "infectious, accessible sound".

The trio's third album, Alive, was recorded live at The Forge, London in March 2010 and released later that year on British label Edition Records, and featured guest US drummer Mark Guiliana. The album was named as Jazz Album of the Year by Jazzwise. They were nominated for Best Jazz Ensemble in the Parliamentary Jazz Awards 2010, featured on the front cover of Jazzwise magazine and nominated for Best Jazz Act at the MOBO Awards of that year.

In 2011 the band toured internationally, performing at New York's Jazz Standard, the Rochester International Jazz Festival, Montreal Jazz Festival and the Ottawa Jazz Festival. At Brecon Jazz Festival the band premiered their project entitled Pitch Black, performing in a completely darkened auditorium and playing compositions from Green Delay, which was composed after Høiby's sister had gone blind. This concert received rapturous reviews from audience and critics alike; "a unique, unmissable triumph" wrote the Telegraph's critic James Lacho in a 5-star review. The Guardian critic described the experience: "After the opening number, all doors were sealed and the lights went down, obliging us to concentrate on nothing but vivid, 3D sound, beautifully mixed by August Wanngren. This triumphant concert was dedicated to Høiby's sister, who lost her sight five years ago." Pitch Black was repeated in Germany and at a sold-out show in London Jazz Festival in the Purcell Room in November 2011, where the All About Jazz reviewer said, "Ripples of tension swimming through the audience alongside the band's writhing polyrhythms were so palpable that a concerned Høiby repeatedly enquired after their wellbeing."

The band's fourth album, Walking Dark, released in early 2012, was inspired by the Pitch Black project, the band touring extensively in Europe to promote its release. "This is music that reflects many moods, but never loses its optimism" wrote Bruce Lindsay in All About Jazz in a 4.5-star review. Walking Dark was the first recording where all three band members contributed to the writing as well as arranging the compositions.

In April 2013, Phronesis headlined at London's Queen Elizabeth Hall. They returned to Canada and the United States, including a show at the Jazz Standard in New York City. They went on to perform for three nights at sold-out shows during the EFG London Jazz Festival at The Cockpit Theatre, London, where they recorded their second live album, Life to Everything, in the round. Jazzwise wrote, "Performing in-the-round and playing like men possessed, the music felt like their most complete artistic statement to date – a fine mix of their incendiary grooves, memorable melodic hooks and spellbinding interaction."

In 2014 Phronesis released their fifth album, Life to Everything, and a second nomination as Best Jazz Act in the MOBO Awards. In The Guardian, John Fordham wrote of the album, "A live album is exactly just the way to get the current Phronesis message across, and this is a powerful one" and awarded the album four stars.

The band marked their tenth anniversary with a tour of Ireland, dates in Germany and Switzerland, a sold-out Pitch Black show at Cheltenham Jazz Festival 2015 then back to Canada. Jazzwise wrote of Pitch Black, "It’s three minds operating as one, a deep, almost uncanny empathy that stands them apart from any other piano trio in Europe." The ten-year celebrations continued with further touring and commissioning Julian Argüelles to arrange some of their back catalogue for performance alongside the Frankfurt Radio Big Band, performing in Germany and at London Jazz Festival. Also that autumn the band recorded their sixth album at Abbey Road Studios London.

With the release of their sixth album, Parallax, in spring 2016, they toured Europe, with an album release at London's 950-seat Cadogan Hall. The Guardian enthused, "Phronesis did their reputation as a killer live band no harm at all with this powerful show." Parallax received excellent reviews. "Phronesis are one of the most exciting jazz trios around," said a 4.5-star review in All About Jazz.

The Behemoth, their seventh album, released in 2017, was a recording with the Frankfurt Radio Big Band of Phronesis compositions arranged and conducted by Julian Argüelles which they'd toured in 2015. Among many enthusiastic reviews, one reviewer wrote, "So incredibly rich in play and timbre. An album to discover again and again and to amaze you." 2017 culminated in the band winning Jazz Ensemble of the Year at the UK’s Parliamentary Jazz Awards.

The album cover to their 2018 release We Are All references the environmentalist John Muir, and continues the themes that Høiby explored in his band Fellow Creatures, inspired by the book This Changes Everything by Naomi Klein. "Thematically, this release is about togetherness and balance" said one reviewer. The band included electronic instruments on one track, adding a new sound element. To commemorate the tenth anniversary of their record label Edition Records, they performed all their albums back to back over several evenings at PizzaExpress Jazz Club in Soho. "This is one of the most intense things I’ve ever done," admitted Jasper Høiby.

On 11 February 2020, the band announced that, from the end of 2020, Phronesis would be taking an "extended break" to allow the members to pursue their own individual projects.

== Discography ==
- Organic Warfare (2007) - Loop
- Green Delay (2009) - Loop
- Alive (2010) - Edition Records
- Walking Dark (2012) - Edition Records
- Life to Everything (2014) - Edition Records
- Parallax (2016) - Edition Records
- The Behemoth (2017) - Edition Records
- We Are All (2018) - Edition Records

== Personnel ==
- Ivo Neame - piano
- Anton Eger - drums
- Jasper Høiby - bass
