= The Study of Touch =

Studio album by Django Bates Belovèd
- Released: 3 November 2017
- Recorded: June 2016
- Studio: Rainbow Studio; Oslo, Norway
- Genre: Jazz
- Length: 56:17
- Label: ECM; ECM 2534
- Producer: Manfred Eicher

Django Bates chronology
Saluting Sgt. Pepper (2017)	The Study of Touch (2017)

The Study of Touch is an album by the Django Bates' Belovèd recorded in Norway in June 2016 and released on ECM November the following year. The trio features rhythm section Petter Eldh and Peter Bruun.

== Reception ==
Professional ratings
Review scores
Source	Rating
Allmusic	4/5 stars
The Guardian	4/5 stars
All About Jazz	5/5 stars
All About Jazz	4/5 stars
Financial Times	4/5 stars

On Allmusic, Thom Jurek observed "Ultimately, Bates' Beloved is a piano trio with attitude. For them, composition and improvisation are interlocutors in a diverse and individual musical language that's meant to "slip" through the cracks whenever purpose—or desire—dictate in order to make something new, or at least new again. On The Study of Touch, that shared attitude carves out a new potential space for the jazz piano trio in the 21st century."

Writing for The Guardian reviewer John Fordham called it "A session by a master improvising composer, and in ideal company."

On All About Jazz, Mike Jurkovic noted "With boundless humor and flexible grace, pianist Django Bates offers us The Study of Touch the perfect piano trio music for the significant other who absolutely hates piano trio music" while Karl Ackermann said "it seems that in teaming with Eldh and Bruun, more than ten years back, Bates was simultaneously laying the groundwork for what has become his own version of a standards trio. In covering much of the trio's previous work, Bates allows himself the luxury of poetic license by reinterpreting pieces through an always expanding lens."

Financial Times' writer Mike Hobart said "The Belovèd piano trio has given Django Bates’ vivid musical imagination an added focus and internal discipline that the pyrotechnics of his orchestral projects sometimes lack. The dramatic juxtapositions and intriguing twists remain, but now they unfold organically from within, driven by a tight-knit interplay that sustains mood and gives the music more room to breathe.... This release highlights Bates’ intimate grasp of grand piano textures and the intuitive bond between piano, bass and drums and has a more introspective air."

== Track listing ==
All compositions by Django Bates except where noted

1. "Sadness All the Way Down" – 2:16
2. "Giorgiantics" – 6:06
3. "Little Petherick" – 6:24
4. "Senza Bitterness" – 3:29
5. "We Are Not Lost, We Are Simply Finding Our Way" – 6:10
6. "This World" (Iain Ballamy) – 5:30
7. "The Study of Touch" – 9:45
8. "Passport" (Charlie Parker) – 2:48
9. "Slippage Street" – 7:40
10. "Peonies as Promised" – 4:51
11. "Happiness All the Way Up" – 1:18

== Personnel ==
=== Django Bates' Belovèd ===
- Django Bates – piano
- Petter Eldh – bass
- Peter Bruun – drums
