= Fallulah =

Danish-Romanian singer-songwriter and musician (born 1985)

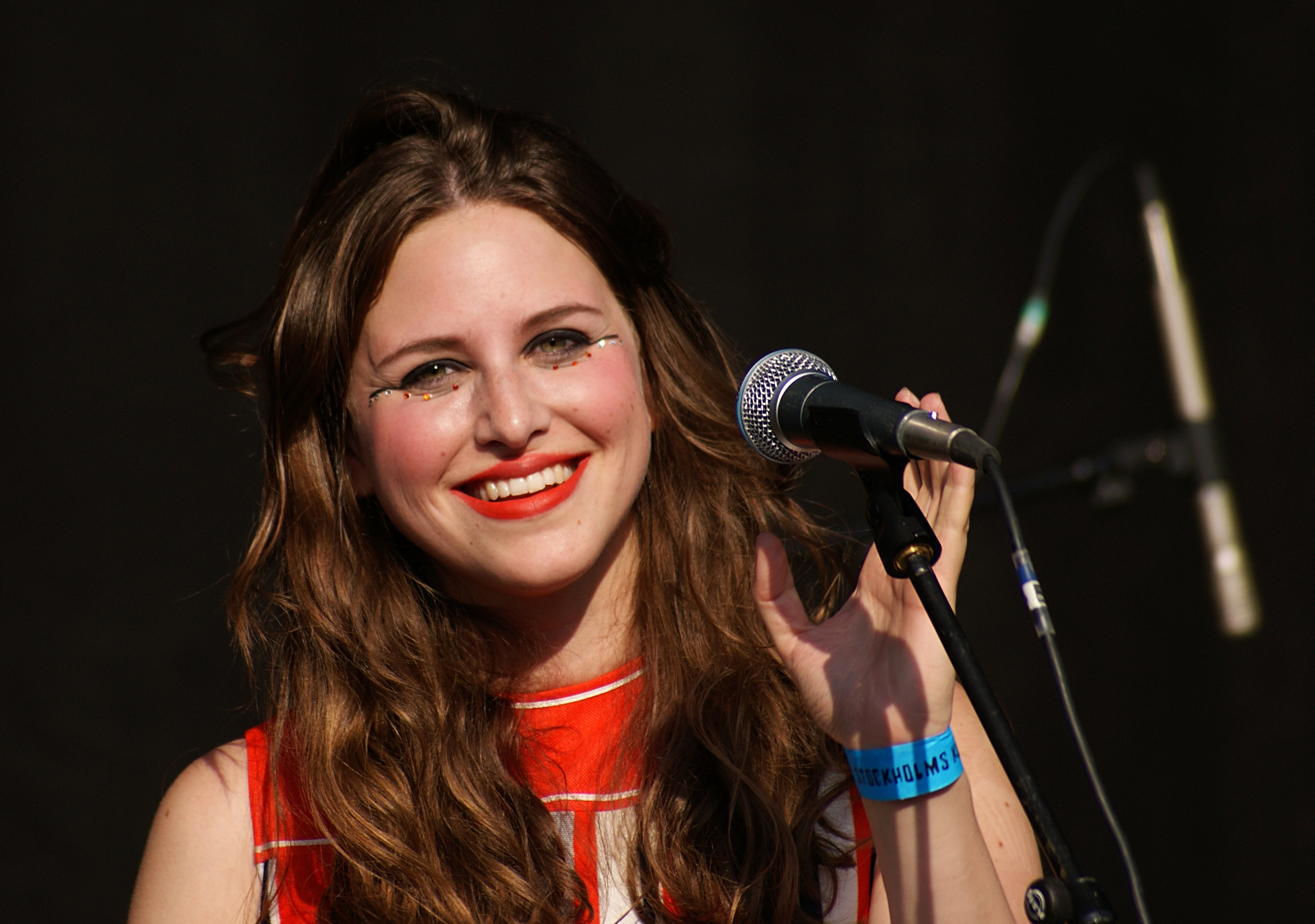
- Fallulah in 2010

Background information
- Born: Maria Christina Apetri; 6 February 1985 (age 41); Tårnby, Amager, Denmark
- Genres: Indie pop, art rock, folk
- Occupations: Musician, songwriter, producer, actress, dancer
- Instruments: Vocals, drums, guitar, piano, keyboards, ukulele, harp, glockenspiel, woodwind, clarinet, tambourine
- Labels: Sony Music Entertainment Denmark, RCA
- Website: fallulah.dk

Fallulah (born 6 February 1985) is a Danish-Romanian singer-songwriter and musician. Her given name is Maria Apetri. Following a short dancing career, she entered the music industry and released her debut album in 2010 which peaked at number three in Denmark and went on to be certified platinum.

== Early life ==
Fallulah grew up in Tårnby on Amager island, the southern suburbs of Copenhagen. She went to a boarding school in Haarby called Haarby efterskole, thereafter she attended Kalundborg Gymnasium. Her Danish mother, Lillian Apetri and her Romanian father Nicolae Apetri, were the initiators of the Balkanic folklore dance group Crihalma. Therefore, Fallulah spent much of her childhood on dancing tours in the Balkans and in Eastern Europe. This activity ceased when she lost her father when she was nine years old. They then moved to Jyderup in the north west of Zealand, where Fallulah continued with her dancing. At age 21 she moved to New York to start at the Broadway Dance Center but then moved back to Denmark to focus on music.

== Career ==
Fallulah has been compared to Florence and the Machine, Timur Bairam, Marina and the Diamonds and Bat for Lashes. She performed at the Start! festival and has been featured as "Soundvenue Selected" by the Danish music magazine of the same name. She was national radio station DR P3's "unavoidable" during week 38 in 2009 with her single "I Lay My Head".

On 30 October 2009, she released "No Time for Love", the theme song for the Danish film Simon and Malou.

Her single "Bridges" was the most played track from a home artist on DR P3 in 2010, and on 15 January 2011, Fallulah won the "P3 Guld" award. In 2011, Fallulah had another hit with the song "Out of It", which was played as the intro for the comedy Lykke on national Danish television. For several weeks the song was the number one download on Danish iTunes. It was number one on the Danish hit list and on the radio list, ending up earning her a Danish Music Award (a Danish Grammy) in the category "Hit of the Year".

Her second album Escapism was released 4 February 2013 in Denmark. It was followed by Perfect Tense in February 2016. In 2019 she switched from record company labels to self-publishing, using her own record label to publish her fourth full album All My Eyes Are Open in November 2020, and in 2023 her fifth album Celeste.

== Discography ==
=== Studio albums ===
Year	Album details	Peak chart positions	Certifications
Year	Album details	DEN	Certifications
2010	The Black Cat Neighborhood: Released: 8 February 2010; Label: RCA / Sony Music Entertainment Denmark; Formats: CD, digital download	3	DEN: Platinum
2013	Escapism: Released: 4 February 2013; Label: Sony Music Entertainment Denmark; Formats: LP, CD, digital download, streaming	2	
2016	Perfect Tense: Released: 26 February 2016; Label: Instant Records Inc; Formats: CD, digital download, streaming	—	
2020	All My Eyes Are Open: Released: 13 November 2020; Label: La Boom Records; Formats: LP, CD, digital download, streaming	—	
2023	Celeste: Released: May 2023; Label: La Boom Records; Formats: LP, CD, digital download	—	
"—" denotes releases that did not chart or not released to that country

=== Singles ===
Year	Title	Peak chart positions	Album
Year	Title	DEN	Album
2009	"I Lay My Head"	33	The Black Cat Neighbourhood
2010	"Give Us a Little Love"	—	The Black Cat Neighbourhood
2010	"Bridges"	28	The Black Cat Neighbourhood
2010	"Out of It"	1	The Black Cat Neighbourhood
2012	"Superfishyality"	—	Escapism
2013	"Dried-Out Cities"	—	Escapism
2013	"Wicked Game"	33	Non-album track
2013	"Your Skin"	—	Escapism
2015	"Social Club"	—	Perfect Tense
2015	"Sorrow Is a Shadow"	—	Perfect Tense
2015	"Ghostfriend"	—	Perfect Tense
2016	"Perfect Tense"	—	Perfect Tense
2016	"I Found Her" (live)	—	Non-album track
2017	"Big Bite"	—	
2017	"—" denotes singles that did not chart or were not released		

=== Other appearances ===
Song	Year
"Do What You Gotta Do" (Fallulah & Cody)	2011
