= Ingrid Søfteland Neset =

Ingrid Neset
- Born: Ingrid Søfteland Neset; 9 May 1992 (age 33); Os Municipality, Hordaland
- Origin: Norway
- Genres: Classical music, jazz
- Occupation: Musician
- Instruments: Flute, piccolo flute,

Ingrid Søfteland Neset (born 9 May 1992) is a Norwegian Classical flautist living in Stavanger (2017). She is the daughter of music teachers guitarist Terje Neset (born 1959) and pianist Anne Leni Søfteland Sæbø (born 1961), and the sister of the vocalist Anna Søfteland Neset (born 1987) and jazz saxophonist Marius Søfteland Neset (born 1985). She is known from numerous performances with orchestras like Bergen Philharmonic Orchestra and in concerts and recordings (Birds 2013) with her older brother Marius Neset.

== Career ==
Neset picked up the flute at the age of ten and attended the Music program at Langhaugen vgs. (2008–10). She is a part of the talented class "Unge Musikere", of the Griegakademiet, where she has been under guidance of flautist and professor Gro Sandvik, she has attended master classes with some of the leading flautists in the world, like Sharon Bezaly, Ian Clarke, Wissam Boustany, in the summer of 2009 she was invited to join in a flute workshop in Weggis, Switzerland directed by the renowned flautist and flute teacher James Galway, and studied music on the bachelor's program at the Royal Danish Academy of Music (2010–13). From 2015 Neset is appointed principal flautist of the Stavanger Symphony Orchestra. In 2016 she received the Léonie Sonning talent prize.

Neset gave five concerts with the trio 'Jenter fra Bergen' at the 'Fartein Valen Festival' in 2009, played with the Young Symphony Orchestra at the Bergen International Festival, and performed for the Norwegian royal family when they visited Austevoll Municipality the same year. In 2013 she first participated on her brothers album Birds with festival appearances on such as Vossajazz, and there after on the album Escapism (2013) Neset collaborated with the Danish artist Fallulah (Maria Apetri), with performance on the Isle of Wight Festival in England.

== Honors ==
- 2009: Musician of the Year at the Norwegian Young Musician Competition in Oslo
- 2009: Drømmestipendet
- 2011: The Partas Culture Scholarships
- 2013: Young Star Prize awarded by Statkraft at 'Hardanger Musikkfest'
- 2015: Winner of this years soloist competition awarded by The Royal Danish Academy of Music
- 2016 Léonie Sonning talent prize

== Discography ==
With Marius Neset

- 2013: Birds (Edition Records)

With Fallulah

- 2013: Escapism (Sony Music Entertainment Denmark)
