= Jim Hart (musician) =

British jazz musician

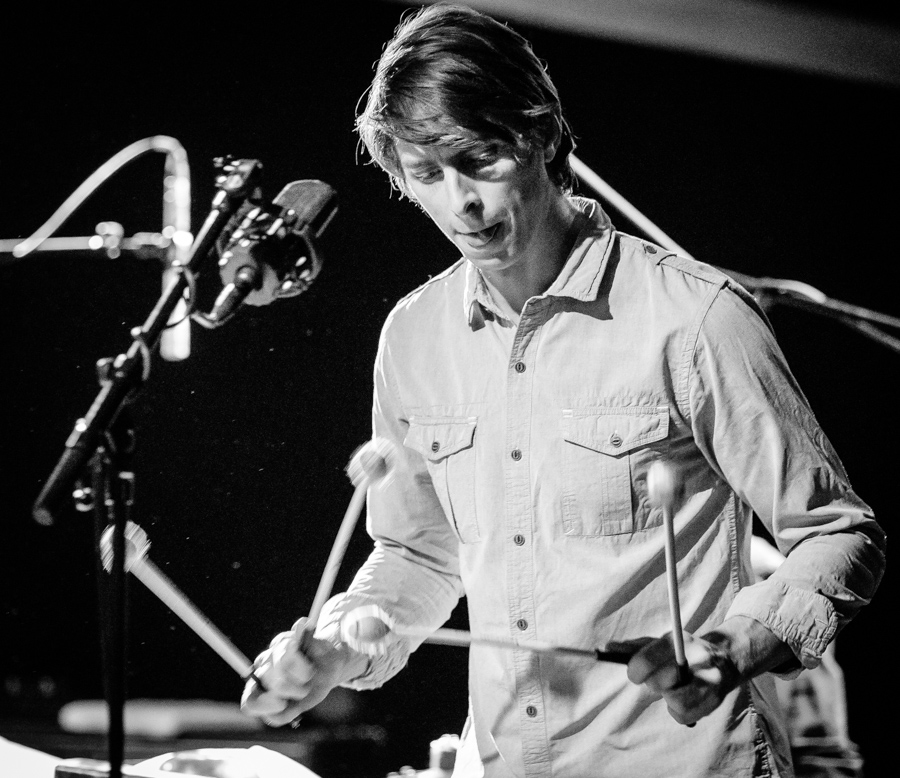
- Jim Hart in performance with the Marius Neset Quintet and Stian Carstensen – Kongsberg Jazz Festival, Norway, 2017
- Occupation: Musician
- Years active: 1994-present

Jim Hart is a vibraphonist, drummer and composer on the European contemporary jazz and alternative music scene. He leads Cloudmakers Trio with Michael Janisch (double bass) and Dave Smith (Drum kit) and, since 2017, Cloudmakers Five with saxophonist Antonin-Tri Hoang and guitarist Hannes Riepler, in addition to Janisch and Smith.

== Biography ==
From 1994–96, Hart attended Chetham's School of Music in Manchester. While a student there, he was a finalist in the BBC Young Musician of the Year competition and also won the John Dankworth Prize for ‘most promising musician’ in the BBC Big Band of the Year competition.

1996 saw Hart move to London to study at the Guildhall School of Music & Drama. During his time in London, he began playing with some of the most established and recognised names on the UK scene including Martin Drew, Ralph Alessi, Stan Sulzmann, Kenny Wheeler, Sir John Dankworth and Dame Cleo Laine, as well as developing close associations with other rising stars of his generation such as Gwilym Simcock, Ivo Neame, Jasper Høiby, Michael Janisch and Dave Smith.

In 2005, he co-founded London's Loop Collective and his group Gemini released the first album on the Collective's label, Loop Records. He has twice been a guest with Wynton Marsalis and the Jazz at the Lincoln Center Jazz Orchestra at the Hackney Empire and Barbican Centre in London, has been the recipient of five British jazz awards, and was nominated for ‘musician of the year’ in the 2011 Parliamentary Jazz Awards. For the last five years, Hart has been listed by DownBeat magazine in the ‘vibraphone’ and ‘rising star’ categories.

He has been resident in Alsace, France, since 2014, and is regularly touring across Europe with Marius Neset’s Quintet and Daniel Erdmann's Velvet Revolution, as well as with his own projects.

Jim Hart is a visiting tutor at the Royal Academy of Music and Guildhall School of Music & Drama in London, as well as tutoring at the National Jazz Collective Summer School and the Jazzwerkstatt in Sarwellingen, Germany.

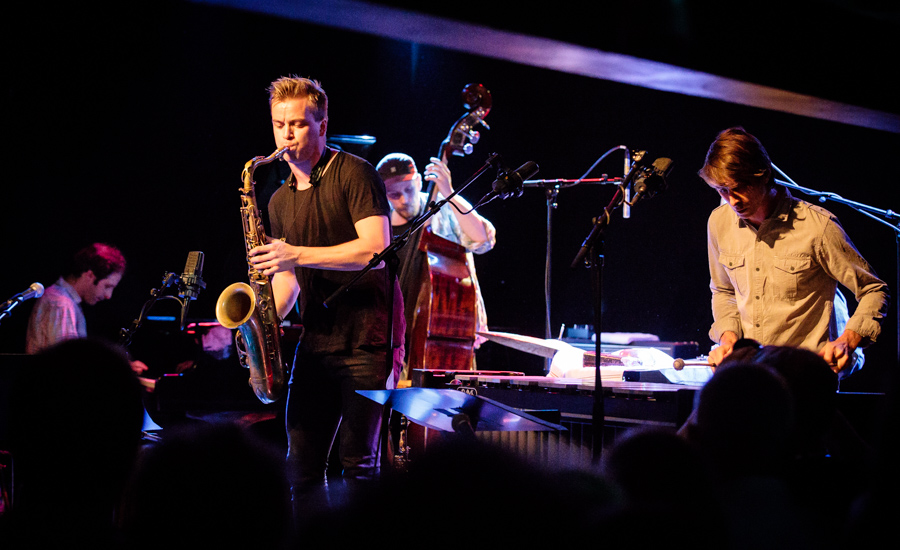
Jim Hart with the Marius Neset Quintet – Kongsberg Jazz Festival, Norway, 2017.

== Projects ==
- Cloudmakers Trio
- Cloudmakers Five
- Duo Plus
- Electric Biddle
- Ivo Neame Quintet
- Marius Neset Quintet
- Primitive London
- Velvet Revolution
- Vula Viel

== Discography ==
- Cloudmakers Five – Traveling Pulse (Whirlwind Recordings, 2018)
- Jim Hart & Alfred Vogel – Come Rain Come Shine (Boomslang Records, 2017)
- Cloudmakers Trio – AJMILIVE #7 (AJMi Live, 2015)
- Cloudmakers Trio – Abstract Forces (Whirlwind Recordings, 2014)
- Neon Quartet – Subjekt (Edition Records, 2010)
- Cloudmakers Trio with Ralph Alessi – Live at Pizza Express (Whirlwind Recordings, 2012)
- Neon Quartet – Catch Me (Edition Records, 2010)
- Jim Hart's Gemini – Narrada (Loop Records, 2009)
- Neon – Here to There (Basho Records, 2008)
- Jim Hart Quartet – Words and Music (Woodville Records, 2007)
- Jim Hart's Gemini – Emergence (Loop Records, 2006)

== Selected discography as sideman ==
=== 2020 ===
- Vula Viel – What's Not Enough About That (Vula Viel Records): drums

=== 2019 ===
- Vula Viel – Do Not Be Afraid (Vula Viel Records): drums

=== 2017 ===
- Daniel Erdmann's Velvet Revolution – A Short Moment of Zero G (BMC): vibes
- Primitive London – Planet Savage (Fresh Sound): drums
- Marius Neset – Circle of Chimes (ACT Music): vibes/percussion

=== 2016 ===
- Mosaic – Subterranea (Edition Records): producer

=== 2015 ===
- Emine – Lullaby of Bedlam: drums
- Ivo Neame Quintet – Strata (Whirlwind): vibes
- Marius Neset – Pinball (ACT Music): vibes
- Vula Viel – Good is Good (Vula Viel Records): vibes

=== 2014 ===
- Kristian Borring – Urban Novel (Jellymould Jazz): vibes
- Hart, Green, Ridley, Brown – The MJQ Celebration (King's Gambit): vibes
- Jiri Slavik – La Jeunesse (Fire): drums

=== 2013 ===
- Marius Neset – Birds (Edition Records): vibes
- Rueben Fowler – Between Shadows (Edition Records): vibes

=== 2012 ===
- Ivo Neame – Yatra (Edition Records): vibes

=== 2010 ===
- John Warren – Following On (Fuzzy Moon): vibes

=== 2009 ===
- Ivo Neame – Caught in the Light of Day (Edition Records): vibes
- Michael Janisch – Purpose Built (Whirlwind): vibes
- John Warren – Finally Beginning (Fuzzy Moon): vibes
- Paula Rae Gibson – You Gather My Darkness Like Snow Watch It Melt (Babel): drums/vibes
- Sophie Smith – You’d Be So Nice To Come Home To (Woodville): vibes
- The New Couriers – Brazilian Thoroughfare (Trio): vibes

=== 2008 ===
- Tom Richards Orchestra – Smoke and Mirrors (Candid): vibes
- Neon – Here to There (Basho): vibes
- The Matt Wates Sextet – A Picture of You (Audio B): drums

=== 2007 ===
- Quentin Collins – If Not Now, Then When? (Sunlight Square): vibes
- Clarvis, Barnes, Hart – Swinging in Studio One (Woodville): vibes
- Adam Bishop – Sanctuary (Bishwan): vibes
- Anjali Perin Quartet – First Reflection (Jazzizit): drums

=== 2006 ===
- Christian Brewer Quintet – Seesaw (Basho): vibes
- Tommasso Starace – Plays the Photos of Elliott Erwitt (Frame): drums
- Taeko Kunishima – Red Dragonfly (33 Jazz): drums
- The New Couriers – Azule Serape (Trio): vibes
