= Petter Eldh =

Swedish jazz bass player and composer

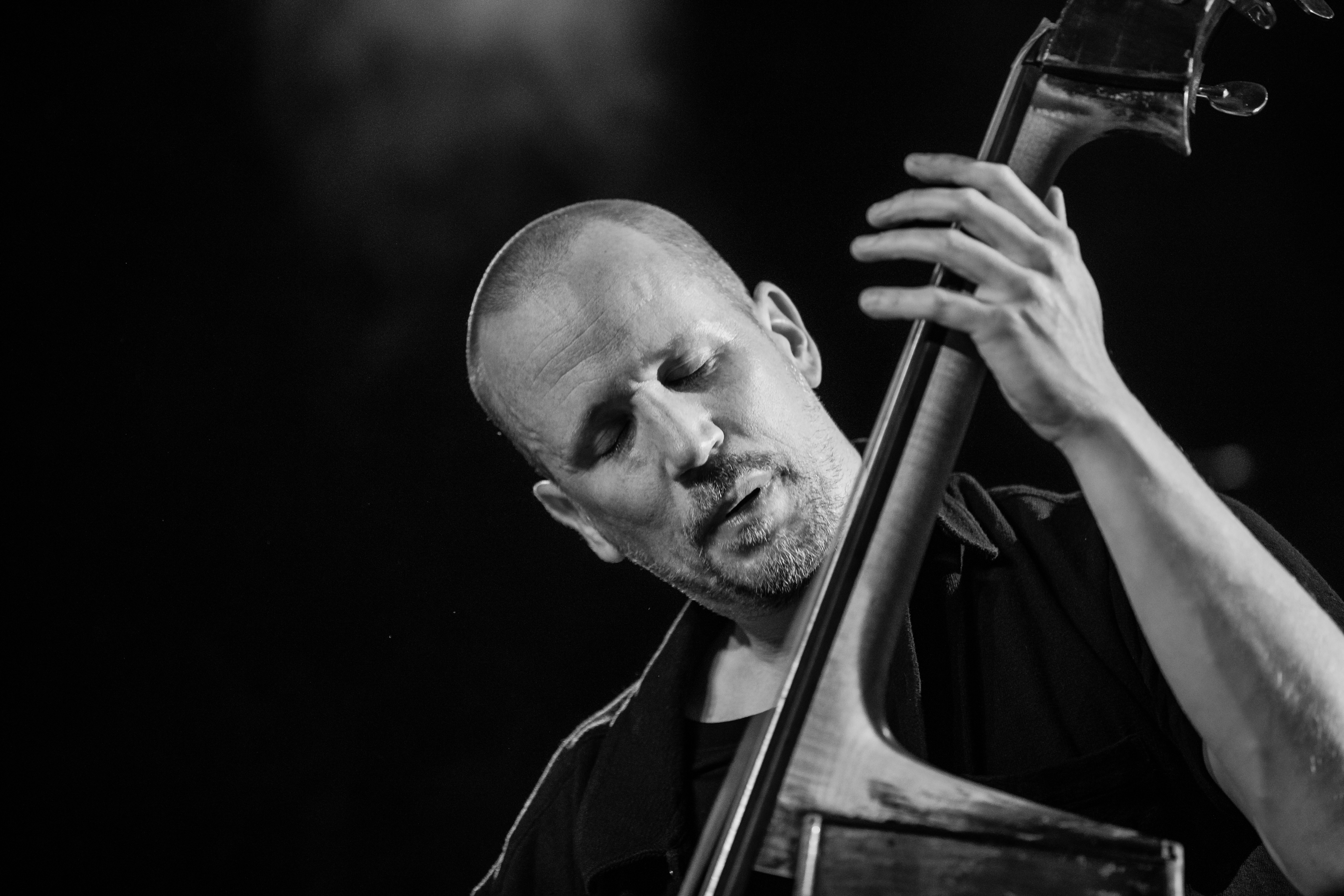
- Petter Eldh performing at Energimølla, Kongsberg 2024; Photo: Tore Sætre

Background information
- Born: Frans Petter Eldh; 19 September 1983 (age 42); Gothenburg
- Genres: Jazz
- Occupations: Bassist, Composer
- Instrument: Double bass
- Website: pettereldh.com

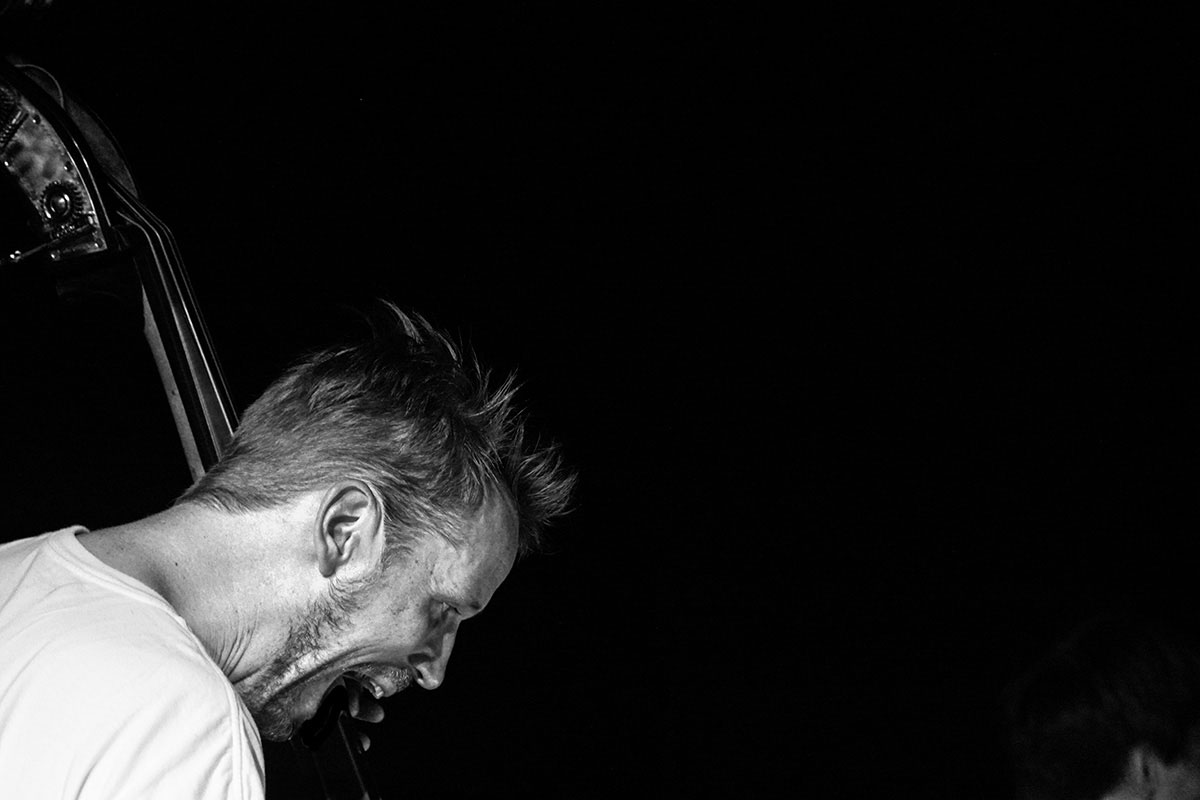
Copenhagen Jazz Festival 2018

Frans Petter Eldh (born 19 September 1983 in Gothenburg) is a Swedish jazz bass player and composer, who predominantly has worked first in Denmark, and since 2009 he has lived in Berlin.

== Biography ==
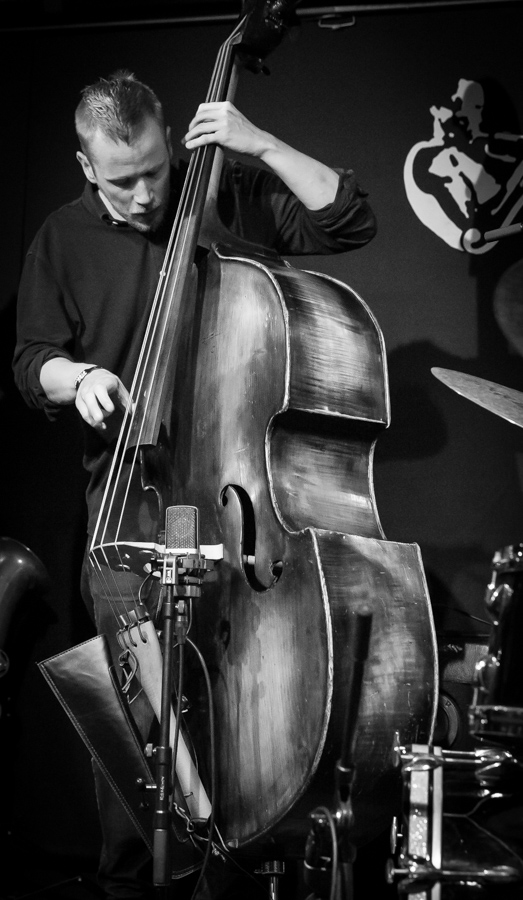
Petter Eldh in 2016

Eldh was raised in a family of artists. At the age of eight he started to play the guitar and bought his first hip-hop album when nine. Three years later he substituted the guitar for the double bass. When he turned thirteen under the influence of the music of Charlie Parker, he got into Jazz. He received his first musical training between 1999 and 2002 at the Sinclair Music School in Uddevalla. He continued his studies from 2002 to 2004 at the Jazz School of Skurup, in order to go to Copenhagen, where the Rhythmic Music Conservatory in Copenhagen, Denmark. He received his Master's degree in 2009. In the mid 2010 he collaborated with Django Bates on the Charlie Parker tribute Conformation (2011) among other things.

== Honors ==
- 2006: Awarded The International Jazz Price Getxo in SpainEldh, with Marius Neset for the album People Are Machines.
- 2012: With Schneeweiss und Rosenrot he received the New German Jazz Award for the album Pool

== Discography ==
- 2008: Suite for the Seven Mountains (Calibrated Records), within Marius Neset's 'People Are Machines'
- 2009: Old New Borrowed Blue (Stunt Records), with Magnus Hjorth Trio
- 2010: Plastic Moon (Stunt Records), Petter Eldh/Magnus Hjorth/Kazumi Ikenaga
- 2010: There Is an Ocean Between Us (Hoob Jazz), The World with Anton Eger, Fabian Kallerdahl
- 2012: Confirmation (Lost Marble), with Django Bates Belovèd
- 2012: Pool (Yellowbird), Schneeweiss & Rosenrot with Johanna Borchert, Lucia Cadotsch, Marc Lohr)
- 2013: Starlight (Unit Records), Slavin/Eldh/Lillinger
- 2015: Pinball (ACT Music), with Marius Neset
- 2015: Firehouse (Clean Feed), with Gard Nilssen's Acoustic Unity

With Django Bates

- The Study of Touch (ECM, 2017)
