= Jasper Høiby =

Danish jazz musician

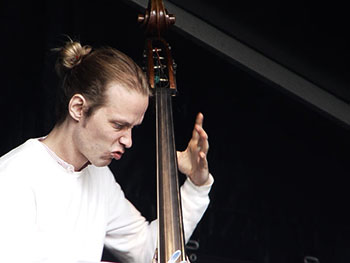
- Høiby in 2013

Background information
- Born: 10 May 1977 (age 48); Copenhagen, Denmark
- Origin: Denmark
- Genres: Jazz
- Occupations: Jazz musician & composer
- Instruments: Double bass & bass guitar
- Labels: Edition Records; Loop Records
- Website: Official website

Jasper Høiby (born 10 May 1977) is a Danish jazz bass player known for his virtuosity and high-energy eloquence.

== Career ==
Høiby started to play the double bass in Denmark before he moved to the UK in 2001 to study at the Royal Academy of Music (RAM) in London, where he got into the London jazz scene. Whilst at the RAM he studied with Milton Mermikides. His time at the Academy led to membership of the Loop Collective, where he later collaborated with Ivo Neame. Høiby established himself as a bassist in London's jazz scene, with performers such as vibes player Jim Hart, saxophonist Mark Lockheart and vocalist Julia Biel.

Høiby formed Phronesis in 2005, and the debut album Organic Warfare (2007) featured Magnus Hjorth (piano). The second album Green Delay (2009) was dedicated to Høiby's sister Jeanette, who lost her sight, and features the current lineup with Neame and Eger. Both albums were well received by critics and fans and helped to establish Phronesis's reputation as one of Europe's best up-and-coming bands. It was Alive (Edition Records, 2010) that really broke big, gaining rave reviews and Best Album awards from Jazzwise and Mojo. The album was recorded at the Forge in Camden, London. Due to a last-minute problems, Eger was unavailable. The American drummer Mark Guiliana took his place temporarily, for the concerts that formed the basis of the album, before Eger returned to the fold. Phronesis has recorded eight albums, all receiving critical acclaim.

His reading of, and response to, Naomi Klein's influential book on climate change This_Changes_Everything_ prompted Høiby to found his band Fellow Creatures.

== Discography ==
=== As co-leader and leader ===
With Phronesis, trio including Ivo Neame & Anton Eger

- 2007: Organic Warfare (Loop)
- 2009: Green Delay (Loop)
- 2010: Alive (Edition)
- 2012: Walking Dark (Edition)
- 2014: Life to Everything (Edition)
- 2016: Parallax (Edition)
- 2017: The Behemoth (Edition) feat. Julian Argüelles arranger/conductor and Frankfurt Radio Big Band
- 2018: We Are All (Edition)

With Fellow Creatures

- 2016: Fellow Creatures (Edition) feat. Mark Lockheart, Laura Jurd, Will Barry and Corrie Dick
- 2025: We Must Fight (Edition)

With Jasper Høiby's Planet B

- 2020: Planet B (Edition) feat. Josh Arcoleo and Marc Michel
- 2022: What it Means to be Human (Edition) feat. Josh Arcoleo and Marc Michel

With Malija with Mark Lockheart and Liam Noble

- 2015: The Day I Had Everything (Edition)
- 2017: Instinct (Edition)

With Three Elements (new trio with changing personnel, subsequent lineups to be announced)

- 2023: Earthness with Noah Stoneman (piano) and Luca Caruso (drums) (Edition)
- 2024: Like Water with Chaerin Im (piano) and Jamie Peet (drums) (Edition)

=== Collaborations ===
With Ivo Neame

- 2009: Caught in the Light of Day (Edition), Quartet
- 2012: Yatra (Edition), Octet

With Marius Neset

- 2010: Golden Xplosion (Edition)
- 2013: Birds (Edition)

With Ana Silvera

- 2017: Arcana (Mirabeau)
- 2018: Oracles (Gearbox)

With Jim Hart's Gemini

- 2009: Narrada (Loop)

With Richard Fairhurst's Triptych

- 2010: Amusia (Babel)

With Compassionate Dictatorship

- 2007: Coup D'Etat (FMR)
- 2010: Cash Cows (FMR)
- 2013: Entertaining Tyrants (Jellymould Jazz)

With Kairos 4tet

- 2010: Kairos Moment (Kairos Records)
- 2011: Statement of Intent (Edition)
- 2013: Everything We Hold (Naim)

With Slowly Rolling Camera

- 2014: Slowly Rolling Camera (Edition)

With Mark Lockheart

- 2009: In Deep (Edition)

With Rory Simmons' Fringe Magnetic

- 2010: Empty Spaces (Loop)
- 2011: Twistic (Loop)
- 2013: Clocca (Loop)

With Sam Crowe

- 2010: Synaesthesia (F-IRE)

With Magnify

- 2007: Magnify

With Tom Arthurs

- 2008: Explications
