= Marius Neset =

Norwegian jazz saxophonist

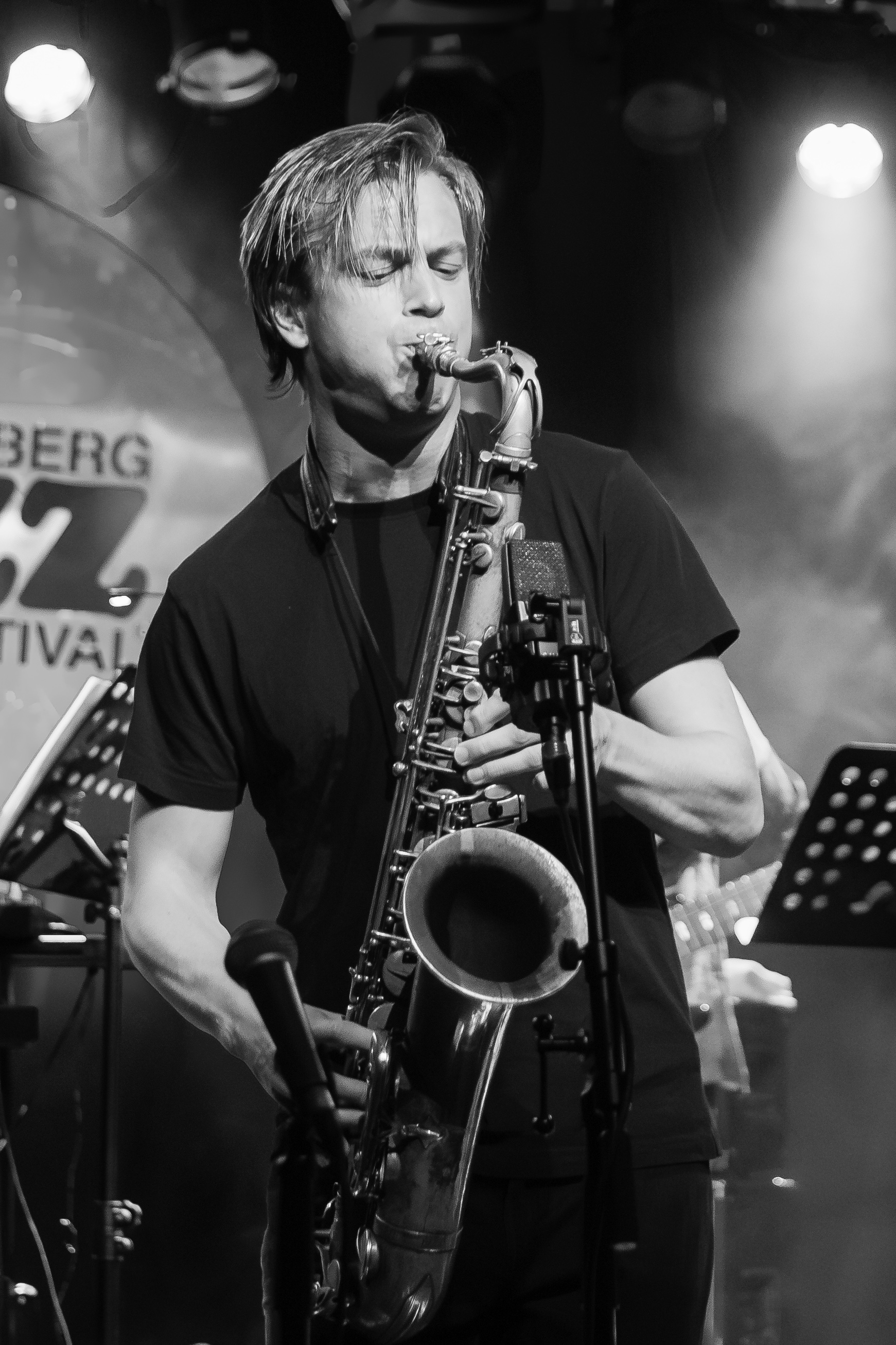
- Marius Neset at the 2022 Kongsberg Jazzfestival

Background information
- Born: Marius Søfteland Neset; 2 January 1985 (age 41); Os, Hordaland
- Origin: Norway
- Genre: Jazz
- Occupations: Musician, composer
- Instruments: Tenor saxophone Soprano saxophone Clarinet; EWI
- Label: ACT Music
- Website: www.mariusneset.info

Marius Søfteland Neset (born 2 January 1985) is a Norwegian jazz musician (saxophone) living in Copenhagen. He is known from collaborations within the jazz bands "People Are Machines", "Kaktusch", "JazzKamikaze" and Django Bates projects "StoRMChaser" big band and "Human Chain". He is the son of music teachers guitarist Terje Neset (b. 1959) and pianist Anne Leni Søfteland Sæbø (b. 1961), and the brother of the vocalist Anna Søfteland Neset (b. 1987) flautist Ingrid Søfteland Neset (b. 1992).

== Career ==
Neset holds a master's degree at the Copenhagen Rhythmic Music Conservatory 2008, and finished Soloist studies under the guidance of Django Bates among others, at the same place in 2010. The same year he toured with the Klüvers Big Band performing their Rolling Stones project, with whom he did a gig at the Kongsberg Jazzfestival.

The debut album under his own name was Suite for the Seven Mountains (2008). Neset called the band "People Are Machines", including Magnus Hjorth (piano), Petter Eldh (double bass) and Anton Eger (drums), accompanied by a string quartet. On his 2nd solo album Golden Xplosion (2011), receiving rave reviews from The Guardian, Telegraph and Irish Times in addition to Danish Magazine, Jazz Special and Norway's Jazznytt. The critique Ian Patterson of The Guardian comments in his review of Golden Xplosion: "Marius Neset, the 25-year-old Norwegian saxophonist who surfaced in the UK last year with Django Bates (his teacher and mentor at Copenhagen's Rhythmic Music Conservatory), not only combines Brecker's power and Jan Garbarek's tonal delicacy, but has a vision that makes all 11 originals on this sensational album feel indispensable, and indispensably connected to each other. Bonuses include an inspired Bates on piano and synths, and the formidable Phronesis rhythm section of bassist Jasper Høiby and drummer Anton Eger."

In 2012 Neset collaborated with the violinist Adam Bałdych on the album Imaginary Room within "The Baltic Gang", including Jacob Karlzon (piano), Lars Danielsson (double bass), Morten Lund (drums) & Verneri Pohjola (trumpet). The third solo album Birds (2013) was called "a heady concoction that surprises at every turn and enthralls in its stirring ensemble passages and epic scope", by the All About Jazz reviewer Ian Patterson. Here Neset is accompanied by Ivo Neame (piano), Jim Hart (vibraphone), Jasper Høiby (upright bass), Anton Eger (drums), Ingrid Neset (flute & piccolo flute), Daniel Herskedal (tuba), Bjarke Mogensen (accordion), Tobias Wiklund (trumpet), Ronny Farsund (trumpet), Peter Jensen (trombone) and Lasse Mauritzen (French horn). The reviewer of NRK Jazz states: "He abolishes the border between jazz and symphonic music and elevates thus both genres to unprecedented heights. He signed up for the label ACT Records in 2013. His first ACT release "Lion" (2014) together with the "Trondheim Jazz Orchestra" reached international acclaim as one of the most important large ensemble albums of 2014. Marius Neset's new quintet album "Pinball" was released on January 30, 2015 on ACT.

== Honors ==
- 2004: The Nattjazz talent award
- 2011: "Sildajazzprisen" at the Jazz festival in Haugesund
- 2012: This years "JazZtipendiat" at Moldejazz
- 2014: "Spellemannprisen" in the category Jazz, with Trondheim Jazz Orchestra for the album Lion
- 2016: DownBeat magazine: “25 for the Future”

== Discography ==
=== As leader/co-leader ===
- 2008: Suite for the Seven Mountains (Calibrated)(Edition)
- 2011: Golden Xplosion (Edition)
- 2012: Neck of the Woods with Daniel Herskedal (Edition)
- 2013: Birds (Edition)
- 2014: Lion (ACT)
- 2015: Pinball (ACT)
- 2016: Snowmelt (ACT)
- 2017: Circle of Chimes (ACT)
- 2019: Viaduct (ACT)
- 2020: Tributes with the Danish Radio Big Band (ACT)
- 2021: A New Dawn (ACT)
- 2022: Happy (ACT)
- 2022: Manmade with the Bergen Philharmonic Orchestra (Chandos)
- 2023: Summer Dance with the Norwegian Radio Orchestra (ACT)
- 2023: Geyser - Live at Royal Albert Hall - BBC Proms with the London Sinfonietta (ACT)
- 2024: Who We Are with Leif Ove Andsnes (Simax Classics)
- 2025: Cabaret (ACT)

=== Collaborative works ===
With Adam Bałdych & The Baltic Gang

- 2012: Imaginary Room (ACT)

With Arild Andersen Group

- 2022: Affirmation (ECM)

With Dave Stapleton

- 2013: Flight (Edition)

With Django Bates

- 2008: Spring is Here (Shall We Dance?) (Lost Marble), within StoRMChaser Big Band

With Esbjörn Svensson Trio e.s.t.

- 2016: E.S.T. Symphony (ACT)

With JazzKamikaze

- 2005: Mission I (Stunt)
- 2007: Travelling at the speed of sound (Stunt)
- 2008: Emerging pilots EP (SevenSeas)
- 2009: The revolution's in your hands EP (SevenSeas)
- 2010: Supersonic revolutions (SevenSeas)
- 2012: The return of JazzKamikaze (Stunt)

With Morten Schantz

- 2017: Godspeed (Edition)

With People Are Machines

- 2007: People Are Machines (Calibrated)
- 2007: Live Getxo (Errabal)
- 2008: Suite for the Seven Mountains (Calibrated)
- 2011: Fractal (Cloud)

With Ole Amund Gjersvik

- 2011: Duo Improvisations (Acoustic)

Awards
Preceded by Fredrik Luhr Dietrichson	Recipient of the Sildajazzprisen; 2011	Succeeded by Marte Maaland Eberson
Preceded by Karin Krog and John Surman	Recipient of the Jazz Spellemannprisen; 2014	Succeeded by Team Hegdal
Preceded by Susanna Wallumrød	Recipient of the Kongsberg Jazz Award; 2017	Succeeded by -
