= Edition Records =

Cardiff-based independent record label

- Founded: 2008
- Founder: Dave Stapleton, Tim Dickeson
- Genre: Jazz, Electronic, Ambient, classical
- Country of origin: UK
- Official website: editionrecords.com

Edition Records is an independent record label that was founded in 2008 by pianist Dave Stapleton and photographer Tim Dickeson.

== Background ==
In 2008, pianist and composer Dave Stapleton and photographer Tim Dickeson started Edition Records as a label for jazz and improvised music. In 2013 the label began the Edition Classics series to focus on chamber music by international ensembles and soloists. The label is distributed in the UK by The Orchard.

Edition has released albums by Ant Law, Josh Arcoleo, Julian Argüelles, The Bad Plus, Tom Barford, Blue-Eyed Hawk, Jeff Ballard, Denys Baptiste, Bourne/Davis/Kane, Cellophony, Curios, Dinosaur, Eyolf Dale, Danish Radio Big Band, Kit Downes, Geoff Eales, Anton Eger, Kurt Elling, Enemy (band), André Fernandes, Kevin Figes, Martin France, Elliot Galvin, Paula Gardiner, Tim Garland, Girls In Airports, Thomas Gould, Jim Hart, Kevin Hays, Pablo Held, Daniel Herskedal, Jasper Høiby, Gary Husband, Per Oddvar Johansen, Laura Jurd, Kairos 4Tet, Mika Kallio, Dave Kane, Kneebody, Nicolas Kummert, Mário Laginha, Helge Lien, Mark Lockheart, Olavi Louhivuori, Lionel Loueke, Rob Luft, Malija, Stuart McCallum, McCormack & Yarde Duo, Fergus McCreadie, Robert Mitchell's Panacea, Misha Mullov-Abbado, Ivo Neame, Neon Quartet, Marius Neset, Helge Norbakken, Oddarrang, Gretchen Parlato, Phronesis, Verneri Pohjola, Tineke Postma, Chris Potter, Jason Rebello, Aki Rissanen, André Roligheten, Roller Trio, Roger Sayer, Morten Schantz, Slowly Rolling Camera, Snowpoet, Spin Marvel, Dave Stapleton, John Taylor, Keith Tippett Tapestry Orchestra, Troyka, Alexi Tuomarila, Ben Wendel, Kenny Wheeler, Norma Winstone, and Neil Yates.

== Festivals ==
The first Edition Records Festival was held at London's Kings Place in September 2011. Further festivals were held in 2012 and 2013. At the 2013 festival, Edition started its classical label Edition Classics. The first release on this label was Vibrez by Cellophony, an octet of eight cellists.

In February 2017, the Cockpit in London featured Edition Records musicians in a Jazz FM (UK) event organised by Jez Nelson. Performances included Laura Jurd's Dinosaur and a solo performance by Jasper Høiby.

== Awards and honors ==
In 2017 Edition Records and the Royal Academy of Music announced that the 2017 winner of the seventh Kenny Wheeler Jazz Prize was saxophonist and composer Tom Barford. The label released albums by previous winners Josh Arcoleo and Rob Luft. In July 2017 the album Together, As One by Dinosaur was nominated for the 2017 Mercury Prize.

== Discography ==
- Activate Infinity by The Bad Plus
- Golden Xplosion by Marius Neset
- Birds by Marius Neset
- Life to Everything by Phronesis
- Mirrors by Kenny Wheeler and Norma Winstone
- Together, As One by Dinosaur
- Forest Floor by Fergus McCreadie
