= Magnus Hjorth =

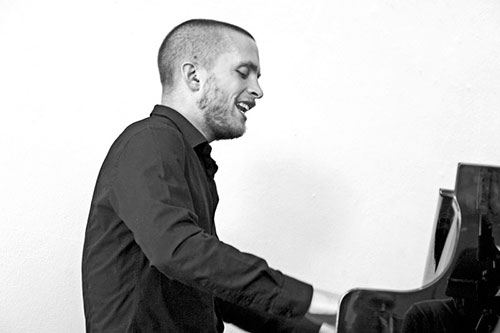

Background information
- Born: Ola Magnus Hjorth; 26 September 1983 (age 42); Laholm, Sweden
- Genres: Jazz
- Occupations: Musician, composer
- Instrument: Piano
- Labels: Stunt Records
- Website: www.magnushjorth.com

Magnus Hjorth (born Ola Magnus Hjorth on 26 September 1983 in Laholm, Sweden) is a Swedish jazz pianist, known as leader of his own 'Magnus Hjorth Trio'.

== Career ==
Hjorth is active in Copenhagen, where he in 2009 completed his musical education at the Rhythmic Music Conservatory. He has studied under guidance of Thomas Clausen, Jacob Christoffersen, Nikolaj Hess, Jørgen Emborg och Maggi Olin, among others.

As child Hjorth played the trombone and violin, but changed to the piano at twelve. He has participated on several albums, including with his own trio Magnus Hjorth Trio which also consists of the Dane Lasse Mørck (bass) and Norwegian Snorre Kirk (drums). The trio album Loco Motif (2007) was reviewed at the jazz magazine Orkesterjournalen's site, where the writer Per Wiken completed reviews of this characterization: "Music with nerve of the three attuned musicians, who exudes power and confidence and which, as we have seen, imposes certain requirements on the opponent listener. To dull jamming is no good here."

Hjorth has also collaborated with the Danish singer Malene Mortensen Group and is present on two of her albums.

== Discography ==
=== Solo albums ===
With Magnus Hjorth Trio

- 2007: Loco Motif (Stunt Records)
- 2009: Old, New, Borrowed, Blue (Stunt Records)
- 2011: Gershwin. With Strings (Stunt Records)
- 2013: Blue Interval (Stunt Records)

=== Collaborations ===
With Marius Neset's People Are Machines

- 2006: People Are Machines (Calibrated Music)
- 2007: Suite For The Seven Mountains (Calibrated Music)
- 2007: Live Getxo (Errabal Records)
- 2011: Fractal (Cloud Records)

With Malene Mortensen Band

- 2006: Malene (Stunt Records)
- 2009: Agony and Extacy (Stunt Records)

With Phronesis'

- 2007: Organic Warfare (Loop Records)

With Ikenaga/Hjorth/Eldh

- 2010: Someday. Live in Japan (Stunt Records)
- 2011: Plastic Moon (Stunt Records)

With Danish Radio Big Band feat. Chris Potter

- 2011: Transatlantic (Red Dot Music)

With Monday Night Big Band

- 2010: Monday Night Big Band & Anders Larson (Calibrated Music)

With Mads La Cour Im Beruf

- 2010: Grandpa' Left You Nothing (Stunt Records)

With Sidsel Storm

- 2012: Nothing In between (Calibrated Music)
