= Critique =

Method of logic and critical thinking

Critique is a method of disciplined, systematic study of a written or oral discourse. Although critique is frequently understood as fault finding and negative judgment, it can also involve merit recognition, and in the philosophical tradition it also means a methodical practice of doubt. The contemporary sense of critique has been largely influenced by the Enlightenment critique of prejudice and authority, which championed the emancipation and autonomy from religious and political authorities.

The term critique derives, via French, from the Greek word κριτική (kritikē), meaning "the faculty of judging", that is, discerning the value of persons or things. Critique is also known as major logic, as opposed to minor logic or dialectics.

== Critique in philosophy ==
Philosophy is the application of critical thought, and is the disciplined practice of processing the theory/praxis problem. In philosophical contexts, such as law or academics, critique is most influenced by Kant's use of the term to mean a reflective examination of the validity and limits of a human capacity or of a set of philosophical claims. This has been extended in modern philosophy to mean a systematic inquiry into the conditions and consequences of a concept, a theory, a discipline, or an approach and/or attempt to understand the limitations and validity of that. A critical perspective, in this sense, is the opposite of a dogmatic one. Kant wrote:

We deal with a concept dogmatically ... if we consider it as contained under another concept of the object which constitutes a principle of reason and determine it in conformity with this. But we deal with it merely critically if we consider it only in reference to our cognitive faculties and consequently to the subjective conditions of thinking it, without undertaking to decide anything about its object.

Later thinkers such as Hegel used the word 'critique' in a broader way than Kant's sense of the word, to mean the systematic inquiry into the limits of a doctrine or set of concepts. This referential expansion led, for instance, to the formulation of the idea of social critique, such as arose after Karl Marx's theoretical work delineated in his A Contribution to the Critique of Political Economy (1859), which was a critique of the then-current models of economic theory and thought of that time. Further critique can then be applied after the fact, by using a thorough critique as a basis for a new argument. The idea of critique is elemental to legal, aesthetic, and literary theory and such practices, such as in the analysis and evaluation of writings such as pictorial, musical, or expanded textual works.

== Critique vs criticism ==
In French, German, or Italian, no distinction is drawn between 'critique' and 'criticism': the two words both translate as critique, Kritik, and critica, respectively. In the English language, according to philosopher Gianni Vattimo, criticism is used more frequently to denote literary criticism or art criticism, that is, the interpretation and evaluation of literature and art; while critique may refer to more general and profound writing as Kant's Critique of Pure Reason. Another proposed distinction is that critique is never personalized nor ad hominem, but is instead the analyses of the structure of the thought in the content of the item critiqued. This analysis then offers by way of the critique method either a rebuttal or a suggestion of further expansion upon the problems presented by the topic of that specific written or oral argumentation. Even authors who believe there might be a distinction suggest that there is some ambiguity that is still unresolved.

== Critical theory ==
Marx's work inspired the 'Frankfurt School' of critical theory, one example of this being in the work of Jürgen Habermas. This, in turn, helped inspire the cultural studies form of social critique, which uses cultural products and their reception to record and inspire change regarding wider social ills such as racism or gender bias. Social critique has been further extended in the work of Michel Foucault and of Catholic philosopher Alasdair MacIntyre. In their different and radically contrasting ways, MacIntyre and Foucault go well beyond the original Kantian meaning of the term critique in contesting legitimatory accounts of social power. Critique as critical theory has also led to the emergence of critical pedagogy, exemplified by Paulo Freire, bell hooks, and others.

== See also ==
- Constructive criticism
- Critical philosophy
- Critical theory
- Critical thinking
- Criticism
  - Category:Criticism
