= Ivo Neame =

British jazz pianist and composer (born 1981)

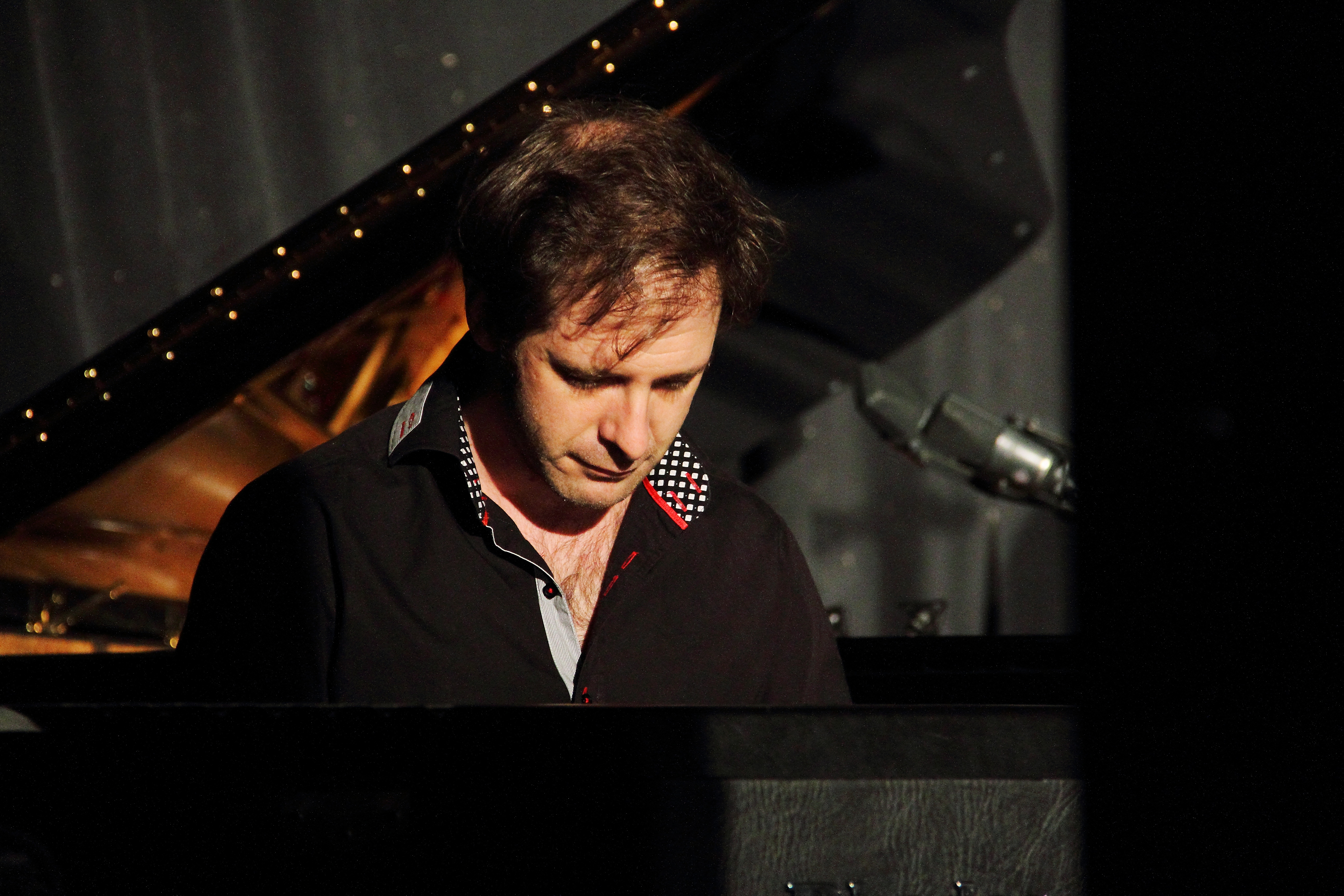
- Ivo Neame

Background information
- Born: Ivo Michael Beale Neame; 13 March 1981 (age 45); Kent, England
- Genre: Jazz
- Occupations: Musician, composer
- Instruments: Piano, keyboards
- Labels: Whirlwind Recordings, Naim Records, Loop Records, ACT Records, Edition Records
- Website: ivoneame.com

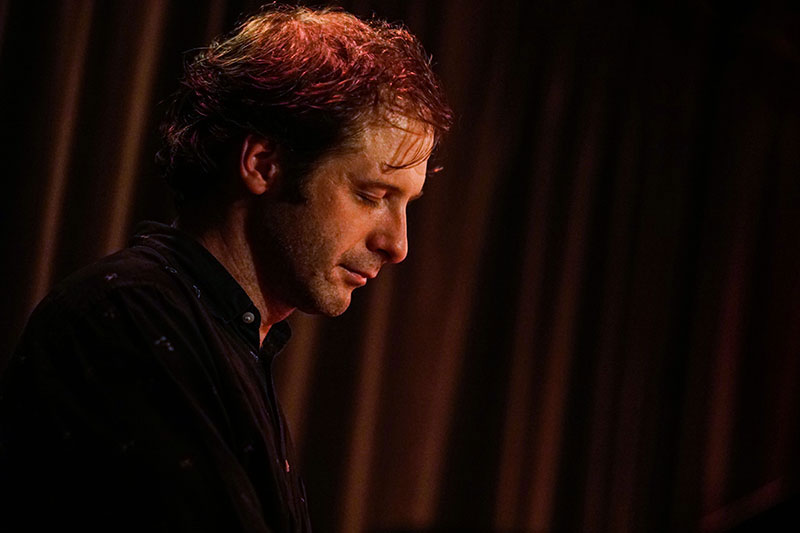
Ivo Neame performing with PHRONESIS (2018) in Aarhus, Denmark

Ivo Michael Beale Neame (born 13 March 1981) is a British jazz pianist and composer. He is a professor of Jazz Piano at the Guildhall School of Music and Drama.

== Biography ==
Ivo Neame is an internationally renowned pianist, composer, and bandleader in the contemporary jazz scene. He has previously worked with the Frankfurt Radio Big Band and the London Sinfonietta. He is known for his creative contributions to the award-winning bands Phronesis and the Marius Neset Quintet; as a sideman he has collaborated with numerous other artists such as Hermeto Pascoal, Kenny Wheeler and Mike Stern. In recent years he has also received commissions to compose and arrange music for ensembles such as the Cologne Contemporary Jazz Orchestra (Germany) and the Sointi Jazz Orchestra (Finland).

Ivo is an Associate of the Royal Academy of Music, an Associate Member of PRS and a Professor of Jazz Piano at the Guildhall School of Music and Drama. He is also a member of the Featured Artists’ Coalition and a member of the Ivors Academy Jazz Committee.

== Honours ==
- 2023: Appointed Artist in Residence, Cologne Contemporary Jazz Orchestra
- 2021: Nominated for "Jazz Composition for Large Ensemble", Ivors Academy
- 2018: Nominated for "Jazz Composition for Small Ensemble", BASCA Composer Awards
- 2017: "Jazz Ensemble of the Year", Parliamentary Jazz Awards (Phronesis)
- 2014: Nominated for "Best Jazz Act", MOBO Awards (Phronesis)
- 2013: Awarded ARAM
- 2012: "Best Jazz Act" - London Awards for Art and Performance (Phronesis)
- 2012: Nominated for "UK Jazz Instrumentalist of the year", Jazz FM awards
- 2012: Nominated for "Album of the Year", Parliamentary Jazz Awards (Phronesis)
- 2011: "Best Jazz Act", MOBO Awards (Kairos Quartet)
- 2010: "Album of the year" in Jazzwise Magazine (Phronesis - Alive)
- 2010: "Album of the year" in MOJO Magazine (Phronesis - Alive)

== Discography ==
=== Bandleader Releases ===
- 2027: Dodeka: New Reveries - Ivo Neame’s Dodeka (Oriel Recordings)
- 2024: Zettalogue - Ivo Neame Quartet (Ubuntu Recordings)
- 2023: Live at Turner Sims - Ivo Neame (Whirlwind Recordings)
- 2021: Glimpses of Truth - Ivo Neame (Whirlwind Recordings)
- 2020: Multiverse - Ivo Neame/Jim Hart (Edition Records)
- 2018: Moksha - Ivo Neame Quartet (Edition Records)
- 2015: Strata - Ivo Neame Quintet (Whirlwind Recordings)
- 2012: Yatra - Ivo Neame Octet (Edition Records)
- 2009: Caught in the Light of Day - Ivo Neame Quartet (Edition Records)
- 2007: Swirls and Eddies - Ivo Neame Trio (Loop Records)

=== Collaborations ===
With Phronesis, piano trio

- 2018: We Are All (Edition Records)
- 2017: The Behemoth (Edition Records)
- 2016: Parallax (Edition Records)
- 2014: Life to Everything (Edition Records)
- 2012: Walking Dark (Edition Records)
- 2010: Alive (Edition Records)
- 2007: Organic Warfare (Loop Records)
- 2009: Green Delay (Loop Records)

With Kairos 4Tet, led by Adam Waldmann

- 2013: Everything We Hold (Naim Records)
- 2011: Statement of Intent (Edition Records)

With Dave Manington's Riff Raff

- 2025: Weightless (Lamplight Social Records)
- 2018: Challenger Deep (Loop Records)
- 2013: Hullabaloo (Loop Records)
- 2008: Headrush (Loop Records)

With Marius Neset

- 2023: Geyser - Live at Royal Albert Hall - BBC Proms with the London Sinfonietta (ACT Recordings)
- 2019: Viaduct (ACT Recordings)
- 2017: Circle of Chimes (ACT Recordings)
- 2016: Snowmelt (ACT Recordings)
- 2014: Pinball (ACT Recordings)
- 2013: Birds (Edition Records)

With Gemini, quartet led by Jim Hart

- 2009: Narrada (Loop Records)
- 2007: Emergence (Loop Records)

With other projects

- 2026: Like Lambs to the Slaughter - Empirical (Whirlwind Recordings)
- 2025: Live at the Parakeet - Tom Barford (Bandcamp)
- 2024: Friday the Thirteenth - Michael Chillingworth (Ubuntu Music)
- 2024: Conversations #11 & #12 - Florian Arbenz (Hammer Recordings)
- 2023: Chroma - Emma Rawicz (ACT Recordings)
- 2022: Dialogues – Jim Rattigan (Three Worlds Records)
- 2018: Tonadas – Julian Argüelles (Edition Records)
- 2018: Life I know – Ant Law (Edition Records)
- 2016: Roots of Unity – Escape Hatch with Andrea di Biase (Whirlwind Recordings)
- 2016: The Darkening Blue – Andre Canniere (Whirlwind Recordings)
- 2015: Zero Sum World – Ant Law (Whirlwind Recordings)
- 2014: Coalescence – Andre Canniere (Whirlwind Recordings)
- 2012: Beginnings - Josh Arcoleo (Edition Records)
- 2008: Flying Dreams – Brigitte Beraha (F-ire Records)
- 2007: Different Smile – Kaz Simmons (Fast Awake Records)

== Bands ==
- Ivo Neame's Dodeka
- Ivo Neame Quartet
- Phronesis
- Marius Neset
- Dave Manington's Riff Raff
- Julian Argüelles Quartet
- Ant Law
