= Shaun Hutson =

British novelist

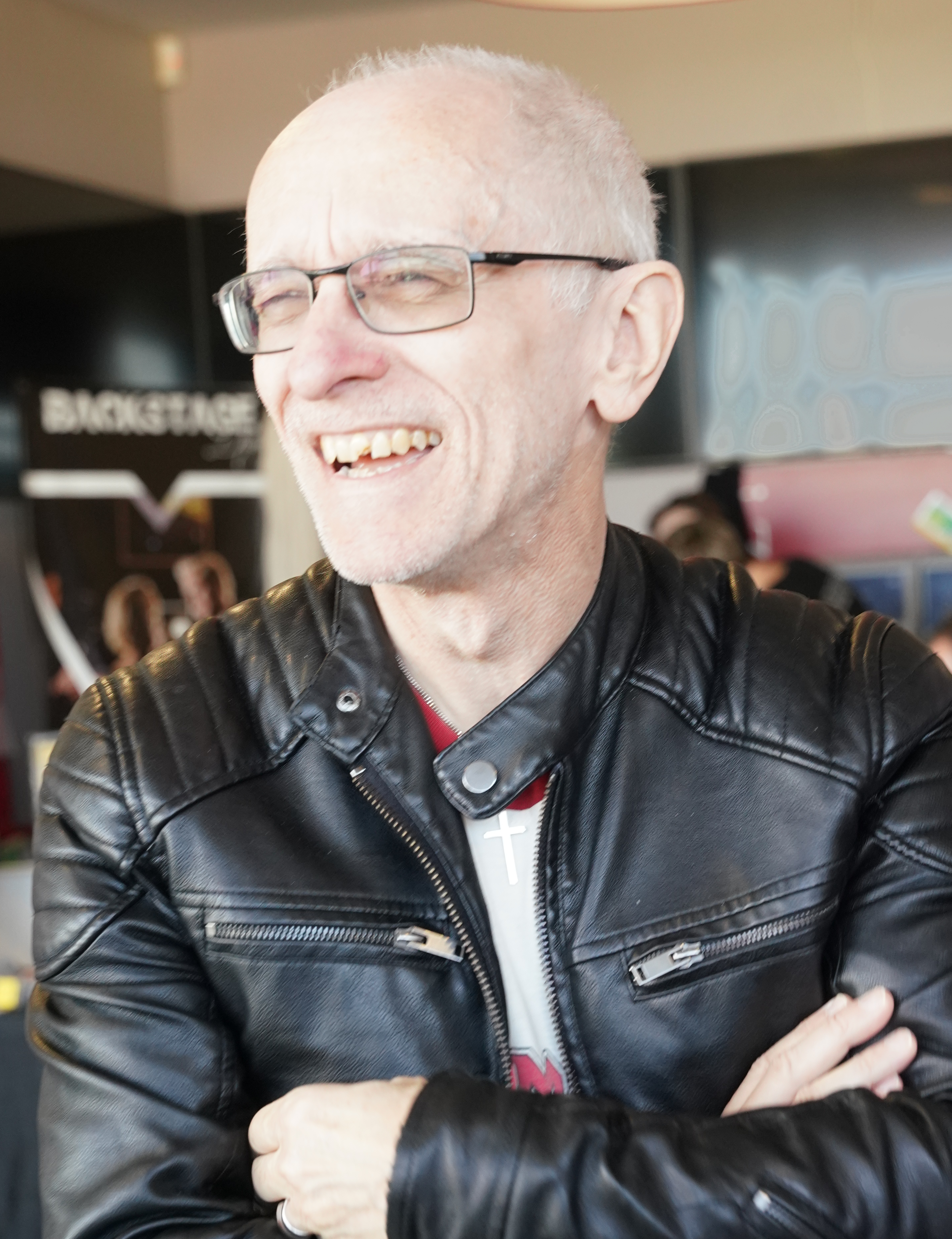
- 2024
- Born: 1958 (age 67–68); Letchworth, Hertfordshire, England
- Occupations: novelist, short story writer, screenwriter
- Writing career
- Pen name: Robert Neville, Nick Blake, Frank Taylor, Tom Lambert, Samuel P. Bishop, Wolf Kruger, Stefan Rostov, Nick Shadow, Spike T. Adams, Daniel Graves
- Genres: Suspense, horror fiction, science fiction, thrillers, fantasy
- Notable works: Slugs, Spawn, The Terminator (UK film novelization)
- Website: www.shaunhutson.com

Shaun Hutson (born 1958) is a British novelist in the horror and crime genres. Under his own name and various pen names, he has written at least thirty novels.

== Background ==
A native of Letchworth Garden City in Hertfordshire, England, Hutson now lives and writes in Milton Keynes, Buckinghamshire. According to his own website, Hutson was expelled from school and worked a number of odd jobs from which he was fired, before becoming a professional writer.

Hutson is a die-hard supporter of Liverpool Football Club.

== Career ==
=== Writer ===
Hutson began his writing career in the early 1980s with the horror novel The Skull. Although mainly limited to the United Kingdom in terms of publishing, Hutson received exposure in the United States after being profiled by Chas Balun in Fangoria magazine.

=== Film work ===
Hutson wrote the UK film novelization of The Terminator, which was published in early 1985. In the new millennium, Hutson returned to film adaptations with a series of novelizations of Hammer Film Productions via Random House UK.

Slugs was the basis for the film of the same title directed by Juan Piquer Simón. A sequel based on Hutson's sequel novel Breeding Ground was announced, but never came into fruition.

Hutson wrote a screenplay for The Figgis Brothers (Jason Figgis and Jonathan Figgis) for their company October Eleven Pictures' feature film titled Box. Shooting was set to commence late Spring 2009. The film apparently remains unproduced.

== Bibliography ==
- sledgehammer series
- The Skull (1982)
- Slugs (1982)
- Spawn (1983)
- Erebus (1984)
- The Terminator (UK novelization - 1984)
- Shadows (1985)
- Breeding Ground (1985)
- Relics (1986)
- Deathday (New York: Leisure Books, 1986), paperback original published as by Robert Neville, LCCN 98-808854; 1987 as by Hutson
- Victims (1987)
- Assassin (1988)
- Nemesis (1989)
- Renegades (1991)
- Captives (1991)
- Heathen (1993)
- Deadhead (1993)
- White Ghost (1994)
- Lucy's Child (1995)
- Stolen Angels (1996)
- Knife Edge (1997)
- Purity (1998)
- Warhol's Prophecy (1999)
- Exit Wounds (2000)
- Compulsion (2001)
- Hybrid (2002)
- Hell to Pay (2003)
- Necessary Evil (2004)
- Twisted Souls (2005)
- The Bumper Book of Lies (2005)
- Dying Words (2006)
- Unmarked Graves (2007)
- Body Count (2008)
- Last Rites (2009)
- Epitaph (2010)
- Twins of Evil (novelization - 2011)
- X the Unknown (novelization - 2012)
- The Revenge of Frankenstein (novelization - 2013)
- Monolith (2015)
- Chase (2017)
- Testament (2019)

== See also ==
- List of horror fiction authors
