= Figgis =

Figgis is a surname. Notable people with the surname include:

- Anthony Figgis (born 1940), British politician
- Darrell Figgis (1882–1925), Irish writer and politician
- Genieve Figgis (born 1972), Irish artist
- Jason Figgis, Irish film director
- John Neville Figgis (1866–1919), English historian, monk and philosopher
- Jonathan Figgis, Irish film director and producer
- Mike Figgis (born 1948), British film director, writer, and composer
- Susie Figgis (1948–2025), British casting director
- T. P. Figgis (1858–1948), British architect

== See also ==
- Figge
- Figes
- Hodges Figgis, shop
