= Rob Luft =

English jazz guitarist

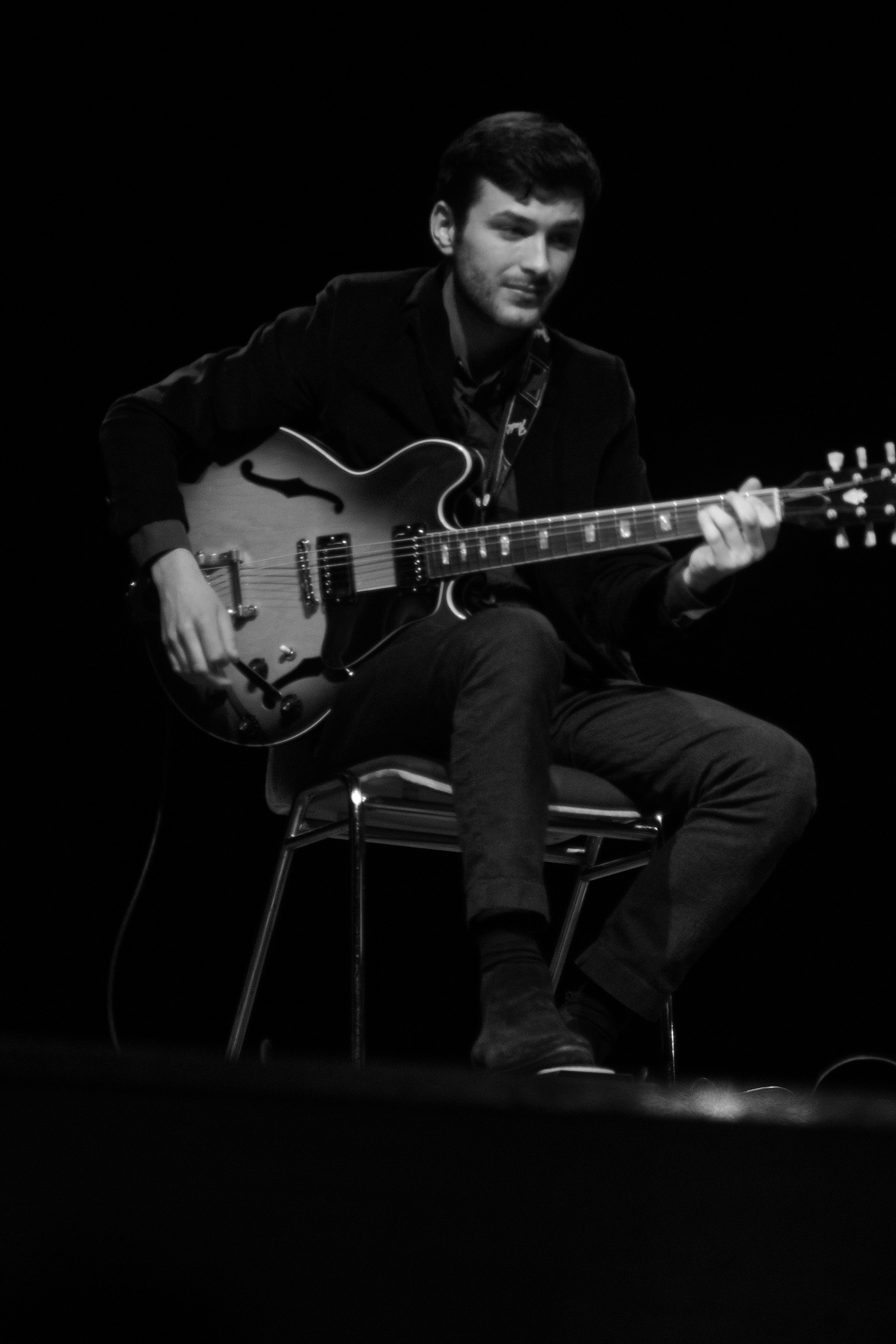

Background information
- Born: 27 November 1993 (age 32)
- Origin: Sidcup, London, England
- Genres: Jazz
- Occupations: Musician, Composer
- Instrument: Guitar
- Years active: 2012–present
- Labels: Edition
- Website: www.robluft.co.uk

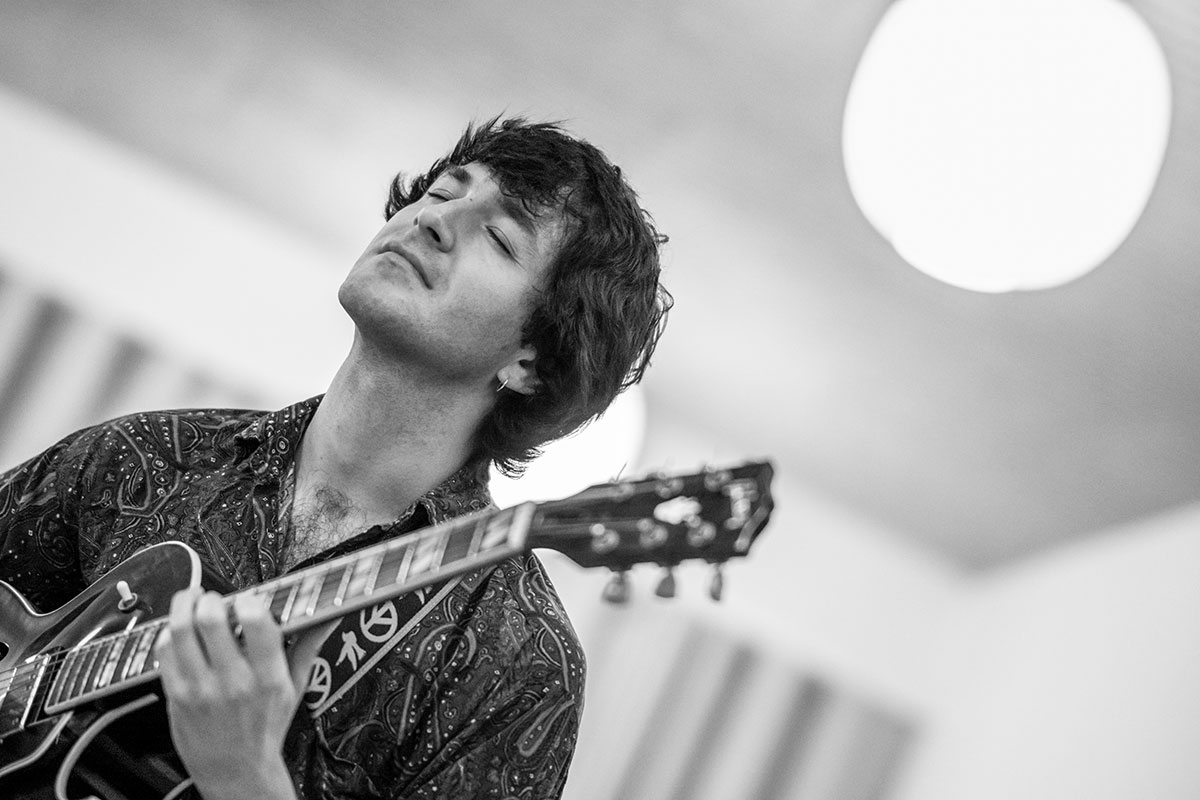
Rob Luft (2023) in Aarhus, Denmark

Rob Luft (born November 1993) is an English jazz guitarist and composer from London, United Kingdom. He has released three albums, Riser, Life Is The Dancer & Dahab Days, as a solo artist on British label Edition Records. His playing has also been documented on several albums released by the German jazz label ECM Records, most notably on John Surman's 2024 release Words Unspoken.

== Biography ==
Luft was born in Sidcup, Greater London, and attended The Judd School from 2005 to 2012. While at this school, he joined the National Youth Jazz Orchestra of Great Britain (2010–2015). He then enrolled at the Royal Academy of Music where, upon graduation, he was the recipient of the Kenny Wheeler Music Prize in association with Edition Records. In 2016, he was awarded the second prize in the guitar competition at Montreux Jazz Festival, adjudicated by John McLaughlin.

His debut album as a bandleader was released in 2017 and was warmly received with four star reviews in The Guardian, The Irish Times, Jazzwise and Downbeat Magazine, who described it as "the most fully-realised and rewarding debut album from a guitarist-composer since Julian Lage's 2009 outing". He released his second album on Edition Records, Life Is The Dancer, in April 2020, which was received with critical acclaim. All About Jazz describing it as "balm for the soul" as well as stating that "every aspect of the album is sublime".

He has also performed as a sideman with many of the world's leading modern jazz artists & groups, including Django Bates, John Surman, Manu Katché, Arve Henriksen, Avishai Cohen (trumpeter), Ben Wendel and The Cinematic Orchestra. Luft was the recipient of the Peter Whittingham Award in 2015 as part of the co-led big band Patchwork Jazz Orchestra, and in 2018 he was nominated as the "Breakthrough Act of the Year" in the Jazz FM Awards and as the "Jazz Instrumentalist of the Year" in the Parliamentary Jazz Awards. He was selected as a BBC New Generation Jazz Artist 2019-2022 & in November 2023 he performed his self-penned concerto for electric guitar & symphony orchestra at the Queen Elizabeth Hall with the BBC Concert Orchestra as part of the London Jazz Festival.

He has collaborated with Swiss-Albanian singer Elina Duni, releasing two albums on ECM Records, Lost Ships & A Time To Remember, the latter of which was awarded "Jazz Album Of The Month" in The Guardian newspaper upon release in June 2023. Duni & Luft often appear in a pared-back duo format of guitar & voice, and the pair have toured throughout Europe, the Americas & the Far East, having given sold-out shows in New York at Le Poisson Rouge (formerly The Village Gate), Montreux Jazz Festival & Cairo Jazz Festival, Egypt.

== Discography ==
As leader/co-leader

Year	Title	Label	Personnel
2015	Encuentro	Self-release	as Deco Ensemble; with Bartosz Głowacki (accordion), Sabina Rakcheyeva (violin), Ricardo Gosalbo (piano), Elena Marigómez (bass)
2017	Pond Life	Big Bad Records	as Big Bad Wolf; with Owen Dawson (trombone, synthesiser), Michael De Souza (Fender Bass VI), Jay Davis (drums)
2017	Riser	Edition Records	with Joe Wright (sax), Joe Webb (keyboards), Tom McCredie (bass), Corrie Dick (drums)
2019	O'Higgins & Luft Play Monk & Trane	Ubuntu Music	with Dave O'Higgins (tenor sax), Scott Flanigan (organ), Rod Youngs (drums)
2020	Life Is The Dancer	Edition Records	with Joe Wright (sax), Byron Wallen (trumpet), Luna Cohen (backing vocals), Joe Webb (keyboards), Tom McCredie (bass), Corrie Dick (drums)
2020	Lost Ships	ECM Records	with Elina Duni (voc), Matthieu Michel (flugelhorn), Fred Thomas (piano; drums)
2023	A Time To Remember	ECM Records	with Elina Duni (voc), Matthieu Michel (flugelhorn), Fred Thomas (piano; drums; viola da gamba)
2023	Dahab Days	Edition Records	with Joe Wright (sax), Joe Webb (keyboards), Tom McCredie (bass), Corrie Dick (drums), Alice Zawadzki (vocals), Byron Wallen (trumpet), Steve Buckley (saxophone, whistle)

As sideman

Year	Band/Leader	Title	Label
2012	National Youth Jazz Orchestra	The Change	Self-release
2015	Patrick Hayes	Back To The Grove	Self-release
2015	Enzo Zirilli	ZiroBop	UR Records
2015	National Youth Jazz Orchestra	Fifty	Whirlwind Recordings
2015	Liane Carroll	Seaside	Linn Records
2016	Luna Cohen	November Sky	Temps Record
2017	Misha Mullov-Abbado	Cross-Platform Interchange	Edition Records
2017	Phelan Burgoyne Trio	Unquiet Quiet	Pumpkin Records
2017	Tom Ridout	No Excuses	33 Jazz Records
2017	Joy Ellis	Life on Land	F-IRE Collective
2018	Enzo Zirilli	Ten To Late!	UR Records
2018	Karen Lane	Passarim	33 Jazz Records
2018	Scottish National Jazz Orchestra	Sweet Sister Suite	Spartacus Records
2019	Laura Jurd	Stepping Back, Jumping In	Edition Records
2020	Ellen Andrea Wang	Closeness	Ropeadope
2022	Corrie Dick	Sun Swells	Ubuntu
2024	John Surman	Words Unspoken	ECM Records
