= Corrie Dick =

Scottish jazz musician

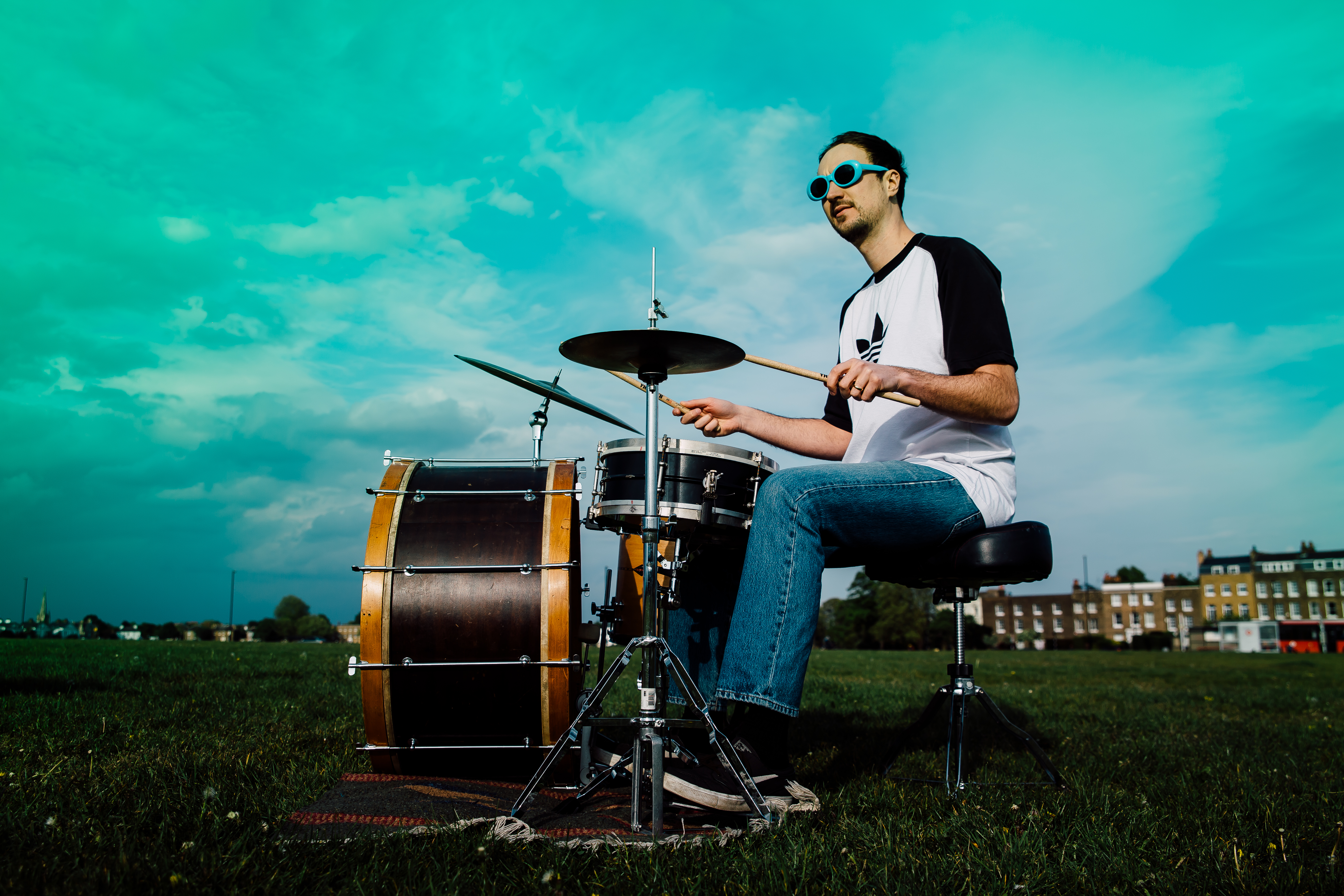

Background information
- Born: 20 December 1990 (age 35)
- Origin: Glasgow, Scotland
- Genres: Jazz, Pop, Folk, World
- Occupation: musician | composer
- Instrument: drum kit | percussion | vocals | keyboards
- Years active: 2008-present
- Label: Chaos Collective | Edition Records | AMP records
- Website: www.corriedick.com

Corrie Dick is a Scottish musician (drums, percussion, vocals) and composer based in London.

== Early life ==
Born in Glasgow, Dick comes from a small family with musical and artistic parents. His younger brother Garry Dick is a chef living in Melbourne.

He attended Jordanhill School learning viola, piano, trumpet, vocals and guitar, ultimately focussing on drum kit. He briefly studied music at Strathclyde University before moving to London to undertake a BMus in jazz at Trinity Laban Conservatoire of Music and Dance.

== Band and artist associations ==
As well as leading an ensemble under his own name, Dick performs and records with artists and bands such as:

- Laura Jurd
- Dinosaur
- Rob Luft
- Elliot Galvin
- Glasshopper
- Norman Willmore

Dick also plays improvised solo drum concerts and has collaborated with Elina Duni, Mark Lockheart, Jacob Collier, Bobby Wellins, Brian Kellock, Leafcutter John, Tom Herbert, Pete Wareham, Kit Downes, Jasper Høiby, Jim Mullen and Matt Carmichael.

His upcoming duo project Norman&Corrie with Shetland saxophonist Norman Willmore will explore the two Scots' shared heritage with instrumentation of drum kit, saxophone, electronics and organ pedals.

== Education ==
Dick graduated as the gold medal student for the jazz programme at TrinityLaban (2010–14) where he studied composition with present-day bandmate Mark Lockheart, rhythm with Barak Schmool and musicianship with Simon Purcell. He has studied drums privately with Mark Guiliana and Kendrick Scott, traditional drumming in Morocco and kpanlogo drumming in Ghana with Saddiq Addy, nephew of kpanlogo drummer Mustapha Tettey Addy. He also practices traditional world music with guitarist Rob Luft.

He is an alumnus of Tommy Smith's Youth Jazz Orchestra and of National Youth Jazz Orchestra of Scotland.

== Awards ==
Having been named as 'Up And Coming Artist' in the 2012 Scottish Jazz Awards, Dick won the BBC Radio Scotland Young Scottish Jazz Musician of the Year Competition in 2013 resulting in cash prizes as well as concert performances at London, Glasgow and Skye Jazz Festivals.

Dick was listed as 'One To Watch' in Jazzwise Magazine's forecasts for 2012 and 2016 and has twice been shortlisted for 'Newcomer of the Year' in the Parliamentary Jazz Awards - in 2015 as part of Blue-Eyed Hawk and in 2017 as a solo artist up against Ezra Collective, Jacob Collier and winners Nerija.

In 2017 his ensemble Dinosaur was shortlisted for the Mercury Prize.

== Other achievements ==
Impossible Things, Dick's debut album as bandleader, was released in November 2015 on the Chaos Collective label, which he co-founded alongside collaborators Laura Jurd and Elliot Galvin. The album, featuring 9 young performers from the British jazz scene including vocalist/violinist Alice Zawadzki, trumpeter Laura Jurd and percussionist Felix Higginbottom and produced by Finn Peters, was lauded by the Irish Times who said "By turns folksy, rootsy, bluesy and indy, Impossible Things announces the arrival of a new and compelling voice in contemporary European jazz."

In 2023 he was a featured soloist with the BBC Concert Orchestra in the BBC Proms for their feature Jazz Then and Now.

== Projects ==
=== Norman&Corrie ===
Dickteamed up with fellow Scot, saxophonist Norman Willmore to form Norman&Corrie. in Shetland where they are learning ancient melodies from tradition bearers and reimagining them in an instrumentation of drum kit, saxophone, electronics and the electronic foot pedals of an organ.

=== Sun Swells ===
Dick's own ensemble often billed simply as Corrie Dick performs a style Corrie has dubbed "Outsider Jazz" toured in the UK in 2023 and 2024. The lineup changes frequently with band members including Rob Luft (guitar), Laura Jurd (trumpet), Elina Duni (vocals), Elliot Galvin (piano), Tom Herbert (bass), Calum Gourlay (bass), Midori Jaeger (cello, vocals) and Huw Warren (piano).

== Discography ==
=== Solo albums ===
- 2015: Impossible Things (Chaos Collective)
- 2022: Sun Swells (Ubuntu)

=== Collaborations ===
Laura Jurd

- 2012: Landing Ground (Chaos Collective)
- 2015: Human Spirit (Chaos Collective)
- 2019: Stepping Back Jumping In (Edition)
- 2019: Trio (Self Release)
- 2022: The Big Friendly Album (Big Friendly Records)

Dinosaur

- 2016: Together, As One (Edition Records)
- 2018: Wonder Trail (Edition Records)
- 2020: To The Earth (Edition Records)

Glasshopper

- 2014: Jenny (Independent)
- 2020: Fortune Rules (Amp Music & Records)

Blue-Eyed Hawk

- 2014: Under The Moon (Edition Records)

Little Lions

- 2016: Embers (EP) (Independent)

Chaos Orchestra

- 2014: Island Mentality (Chaos Collective)

=== As Sideman ===
Rob Luft

- 2017: Riser (Edition Records)
- 2020: Life Is The Dancer (Edition Records)
- 2023: Dahab Days (Edition Records)

Elliot Galvin

- 2018: The Influencing Machine (Edition Records)
- 2019: Modern Times (Edition Records)

Dave Malkin/Black Hours

- 2020: Saccharine (Black Hours)

Jasper Høiby

- 2016: Fellow Creatures (Edition Records)
