= Figes =

Figes is a surname. Notable people with the surname include:

- Craig Figes (born 1978), British water polo player
- Eva Figes (1932–2012), English author and feminist
- Kate Figes, English author and journalist
- Kevin Figes, British saxophonist, flutist, bandleader, and composer
- Orlando Figes, British historian and author

== See also ==
- Figgis
- Figge
