= Together, As One =

Studio album by Dinosaur
- Released: 16 September 2016
- Recorded: 29 March 2016 to 31 March 2016
- Studio: Livingston Studios, London (recording); The Cowshed Studio, London (mixing); The Blue Studio, London (mastering)
- Genre: Jazz
- Label: Edition
- Producer: Laura Jurd

Together, As One is an album by British jazz quartet Dinosaur. It was released in 2016 on Edition Records. In 2017, it was nominated for the Mercury Prize.

== Critical reception ==
The album has received generally positive reviews, receiving five stars from The Guardian, four from The Jazz Mann, and four and a half from All About Jazz.

== Track listing ==
All music is composed by Laura Jurd.

No.	Title	Length
1.	"Awakening"	8:33
2.	"Robin"	6:50
3.	"Living, Breathing"	6:37
4.	"Underdog"	2:50
5.	"Steadily Sinking"	1:49
6.	"Extinct"	9:29
7.	"Primordial"	7:46
8.	"Interlude"	2:56

== Personnel ==
- Laura Jurd – trumpet, synth
- Elliot Galvin – keyboard, synth
- Conor Chaplin – electric bass
- Corrie Dick – drums
- Sonny Johns – Recording and Mix Engineer
