= Elliot Galvin =

British musician and composer

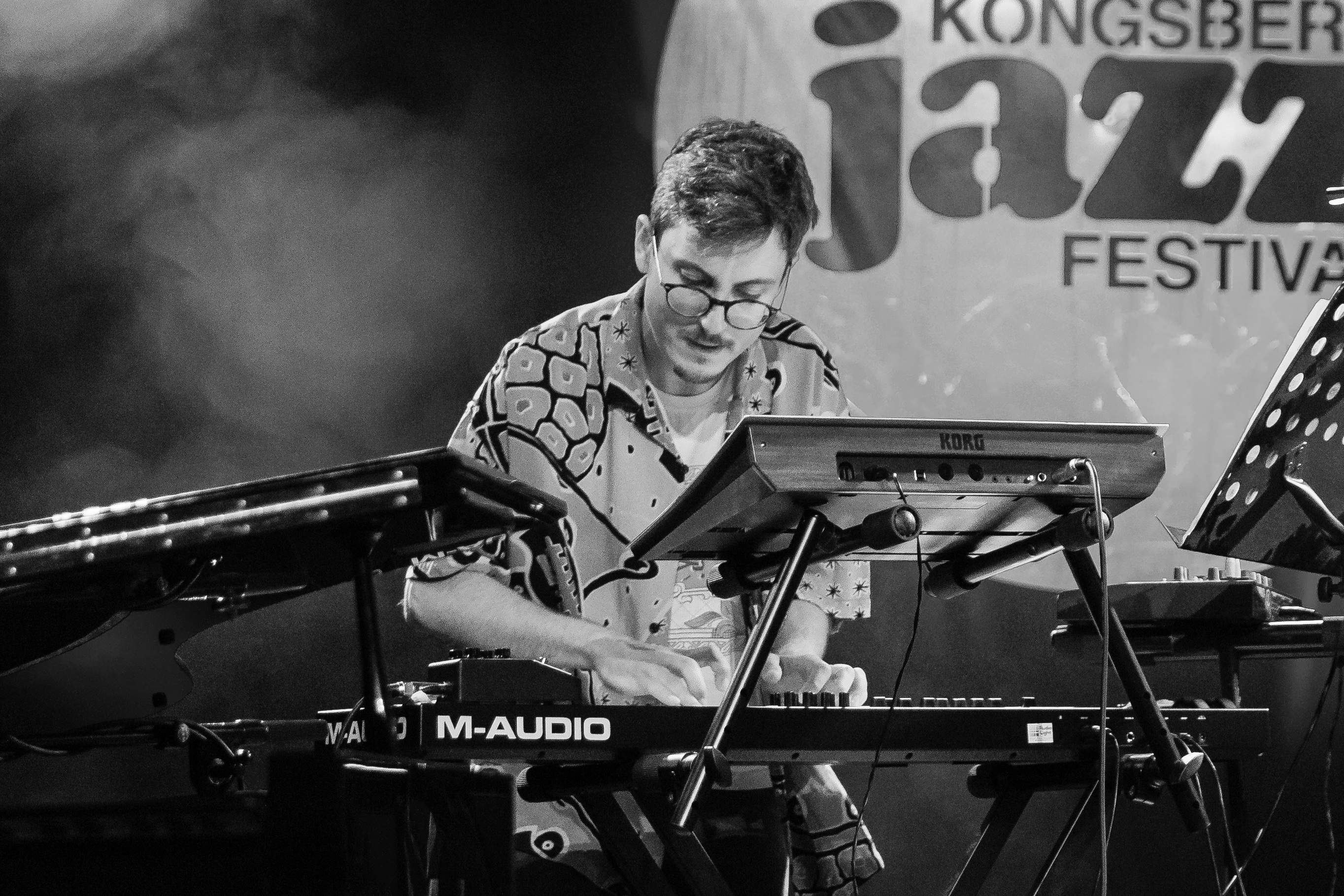

Background information
- Born: 1991
- Origin: UK
- Genre: Jazz
- Occupations: Musician and composer
- Instruments: Piano, synthesizer, others
- Labels: Edition Records; Chaos Collective
- Website: elliotgalvin.com

Elliot Galvin (born 1991) is a British musician and composer based in London. He plays piano, synthesizer, kalimba, microtonal melodica, accordion and stylophone. His primary artistic vehicle is the eponymous Elliot Galvin Trio. He is also a member of the jazz ensembles Dinosaur and Emma-Jean Thackray's WALRUS.

Galvin has exhibited work at the Turner Contemporary art gallery.

== Elliot Galvin Trio ==
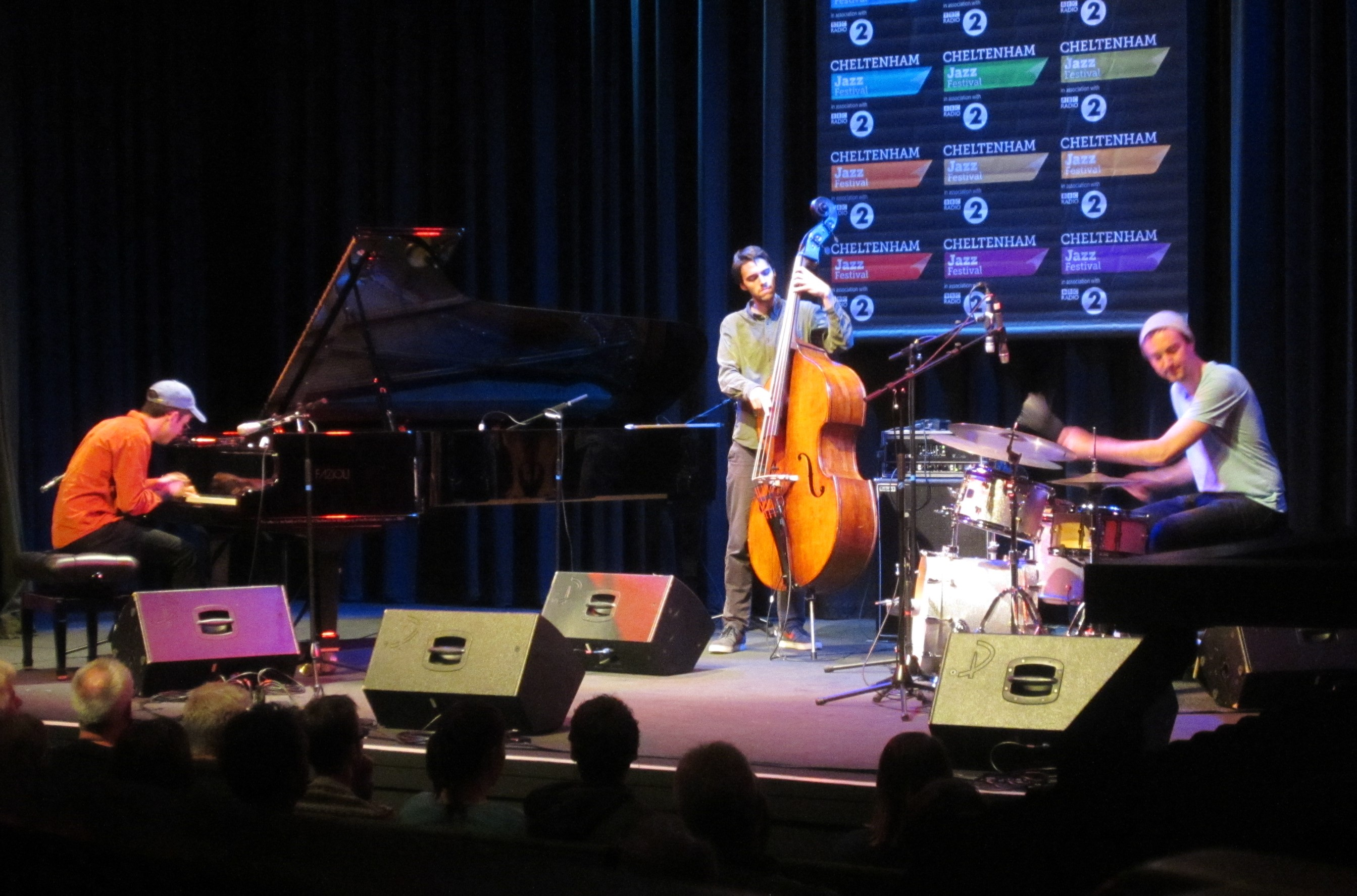
Elliot Galvin Trio in Cheltenham, 2017

Elliot Galvin Trio comprises piano, bass and drums. The live and studio line-up has been as follows:

- Elliot Galvin - piano, other instruments
- Tom McCredie - bass
- Corrie Dick - drums

In addition to piano, Galvin plays kalimba, accordion and stylophone with the trio. He plays a bespoke microtonal melodica on the track Blop and uses a portable cassette player to insert recorded sounds into recordings and performances.

== Discography ==
- Landing Ground, (with Laura Jurd & Ligeti Quartet, Chaos Collective, 2012)
- Dreamland (Chaos Collective, 2013)
- Punch (as The Elliot Galvin Trio, Edition Records, 2016)
- Together, As One (with Dinosaur, Edition Records, 2016)
- Weather (with Mark Sanders, Babel Label, 2017)
- The Influencing Machine (Edition Records, 2018)
- Wonder Trail (with Dinosaur, Edition Records, 2018)
- Modern Times (Edition Records, 2019)
- To The Earth (with Dinosaur, Edition Records, 2020)

== Associated acts ==
Galvin also plays synthesizers in British jazz quartet Dinosaur.

== Accolades ==
Elliot Galvin Trio won the 2014 European Young Jazz Artist of the Year Award. They were nominated for the Jazz Parliamentary Jazz Awards Newcomer of the Year in 2015. In July 2017, Together, As One was nominated for the Mercury Music Prize.
