= Dallëndyshe =

Studio album by the Elina Duni Quartet
- Released: April 17, 2015
- Recorded: July 2014
- Studio: Studios la Buissonne; Pernes-les-Fontaines
- Genre: Jazz
- Length: 55:07
- Label: ECM; ECM 2401
- Producer: Manfred Eicher

Elina Duni chronology
Muza e zezë (2014)	Dallëndyshe (2015)

Professional ratings
Review scores
Source	Rating
The Guardian	3/5 stars

Dallëndyshe (Albanian: "Swallow") is an album by the Elina Duni Quartet recorded in July 2014 and released on ECM April the following year—the Swiss-Albanian singer's second release for the label, and her fifth overall.

== Composition ==
Like her previous album, the troubled past of the Balkan region is the main inspiration for the album, but Elina Duni adds that "Even though we are dealing with tragic themes of exile it is not as dark as Matanё Malit."

== Track listing ==
No.	Title	Writer(s)	Length
1.	"Fëllënza"	Muharrem Gurra	6:03
2.	"Sytë"	Isak Muçolli	5:09
3.	"Ylberin"	Traditional from Albania	5:05
4.	"Unë dë Konër, ti në Kodër"	Traditional from Kosovo	6:12
5.	"Kurtë Pachë"	Traditional from Albania	4:48
6.	"Delja Rude"	Traditional from Albania	5:19
7.	"Unë do të Vete"	Traditional from Albania	4:59
8.	"Taksirat"	Traditional from Albania	3:27
9.	"Nënë Moj"	Traditional from Albania	4:14
10.	"Bukuroshe"	Traditional from Albania	4:16
11.	"Ti ri ti ti Klarinatë"	Traditional from Arvanitas	2:49
12.	"Dallëndyshe"	Traditional from Arbëresh	2:46
Total length:			55:07

== Personnel ==
=== Elina Duni Quartet ===
- Elina Duni – voice
- Colin Vallon – piano
- Patrice Moret – double bass
- Norbert Pfammatter – drums
