= Dinosaur (band) =

British jazz quartet

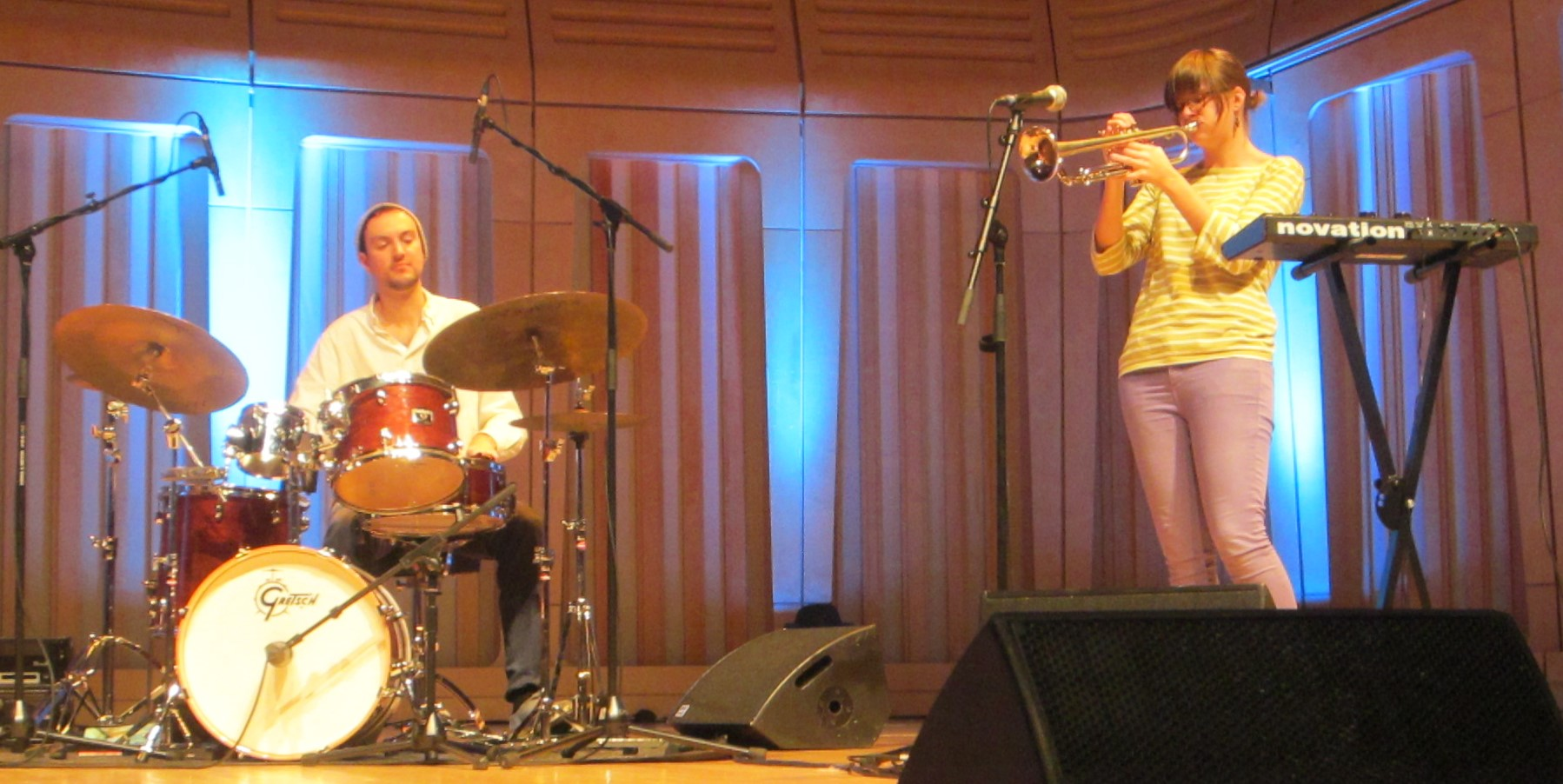
- Dinosaur live on stage in Cardiff in October 2016. Corrie Dick and Laura Jurd shown.

Background information
- Origin: United Kingdom
- Genre: Jazz
- Years active: 2010–present
- Label: Edition Records
- Members: Laura Jurd; Elliot Galvin; Corrie Dick; Conor Chaplin
- Website: laurajurd.com/dinosaur

Dinosaur are a British jazz quartet founded in 2010. The band comprises Laura Jurd on trumpet and synthesizers, Elliot Galvin on keyboards and synthesizers, Corrie Dick on drums, and Conor Chaplin on bass.

== History ==
Jurd composes the band's music and has described it as "Trumpet-led instrumental music" though they are often described as "jazz", having appeared at jazz festivals and on the BBC Radio 3 Jazz Now programme. The group formed around 2010, and adopted the name Dinosaur in 2016. Dinosaur were nominated for UK Jazz Artist Of The Year 2017 by Jazz FM. In July 2017, the band's debut album, Together, As One, was nominated for the Mercury Prize.

== Discography ==
- Together, As One (16 September 2016, Edition Records)
- Wonder Trail (4 May 2018, Edition Records)
- To The Earth (15 May 2020, Edition Records)

== Related projects ==
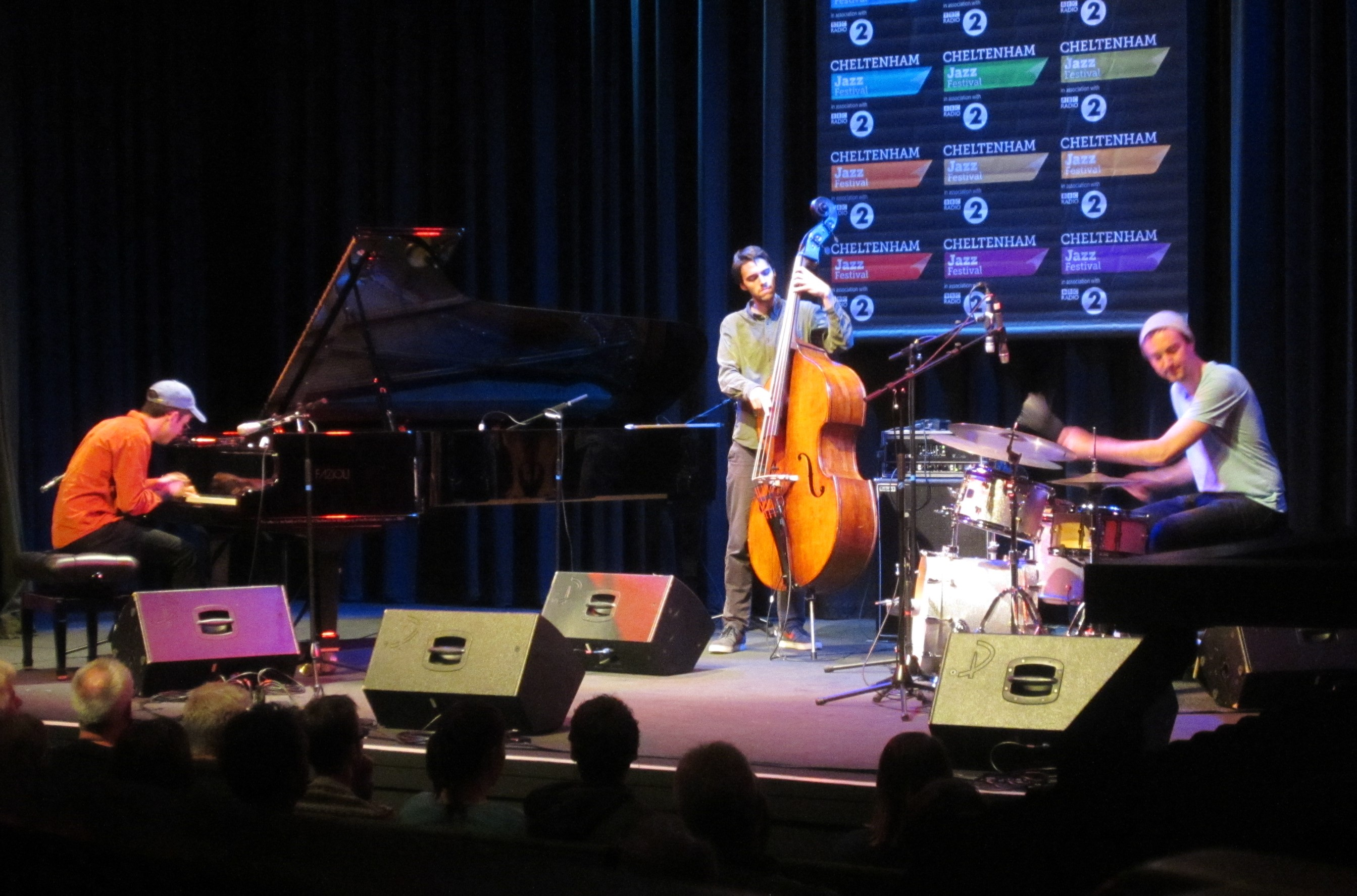
Galvin and Dick with Tom McCredie as Elliot Galvin Trio in Cheltenham, UK

Galvin and Dick have also performed together in 2017 with Tom McCredie as the Elliot Galvin Trio; the group performed under this name at the Cheltenham Jazz Festival in 2017. Jurd is a member of BBC Radio 3's New Generation Artists.

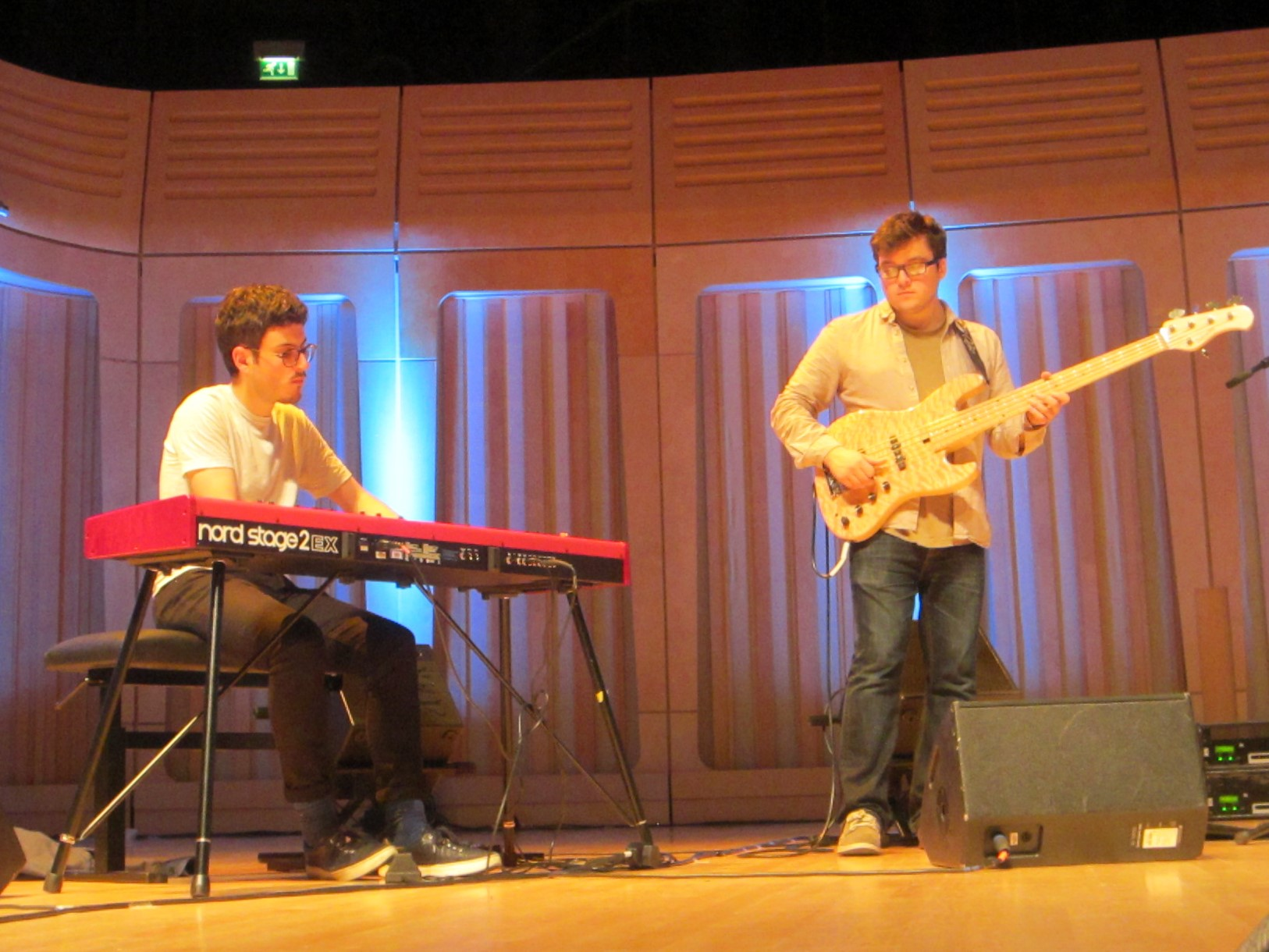
British jazz quartet Dinosaur live on stage in Cardiff in October 2016. Elliot Galvin and Conor Chaplin shown.
