= Jonathan Figgis =

Irish film director and producer

Jonathan Figgis is an Irish film director and producer. He was a co-founder and director of award-winning film production company October Eleven Pictures. Having left October Eleven Pictures in 2012, he now heads Figgis Visuals.

== Early life, family and education ==
Figgis's parents are Peter and Anne Figgis. Figgis has at least two older brothers: Daniel, a former child actor; and Jason Figgis, who has also been a business partner. A cousin, Mike Figgis, is an Academy Award-nominated writer and director of the feature film Leaving Las Vegas.

== Career ==
Figgis worked in the animation industry for a number of years, contributing on award-winning independent animated shorts as well as television series for the international market.

He is a full voting member of the Irish Film & Television Academy.

=== October Eleven Pictures ===
In 1999, Jonathan and Jason embarked on their collaborative filmmaking careers working on their first short film, "Pallida Mors".

With the advent of digital technology, the brothers' childhood dreams of making movies materialized as their Dublin-based company, October Eleven Pictures, was formed in February 2001 (though many sources cite 2002 and Jason has also mentioned forming their collaboration in 2000). When October Eleven Pictures was established, Jonathan was responsible for sourcing support from post-production houses who offered their services at reduced costs and who have shown great interest and support for their filmmaking ventures.

Jonathan has been a producer or executive producer on a variety of programmes for Discovery Channel, Sky One, RTÉ (Ireland) and SVT (Sweden), among others. These shows include the feature-length documentary The Twilight Hour, Uri's Haunted Cities: Venice with paranormalist Uri Geller, and the co-production A Maverick In London featuring Joanna Lumley, Steven Berkoff, Richard E. Grant, and Alan Rickman. There has been much success on the festival circuit with official selections at many international festivals, an IFTA Award nomination in 2003 and won Best Feature Film for A Curious Incident In The Life of Uri Geller in 2006.

October Eleven Picture's first feature film 3Crosses (released in the US as Once Upon a Time in Dublin) was completed for Spring 2010 whilst they were preparing for post-production on two feature films (shot Autumn 2007), Handheld and Blood. Blood premiered at the Galway Film Fleadh in 2011.

=== Figgis Visuals ===
Jonathan left October Eleven Pictures in 2012 to work on a number of projects including a feature film that he was writing on and off since 2007. Under his new company, Figgis Visuals, this film will be its first release. It was scheduled to go into production in July 2013 with a release in 2014. Jonathan is also working on two documentaries and is writing a book/producing DVDs on self-defence.
