= Simon Marsden =

English photographer and author

Sir Simon Neville Llewelyn Marsden, 4th Baronet
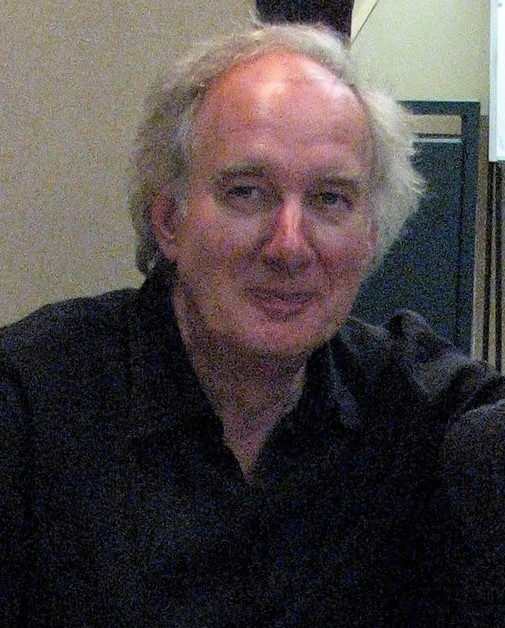
- Simon Marsden 2009
- Born: Simon Neville Llewelyn Marsden; 1 December 1948
- Died: 22 January 2012 (aged 63)
- Occupation: Photographer
- Website: Simonmarsden.co.uk

Sir Simon Neville Llewelyn Marsden, 4th Baronet (1 December 1948 – 22 January 2012) was an English photographer and author. He is known best for his uncommon black-and-white photographs of allegedly haunted houses and places throughout Europe. He succeeded his brother as baronet of Grimsby in Lincolnshire in 1997.

== Life and work ==
Simon Neville Llewelyn Marsden was the younger son of Sir John Denton Marsden, 2nd Bt, and his wife Hope (née Llewelyn). The baronetcy was created in 1924 for a previous John Marsden, owner of a substantial fishing fleet in Grimsby. Marsden attended Ampleforth College in North Yorkshire, as well as the University of Sorbonne. From 1969, he worked as an assistant to Irish photographer Ruan O'Lochlainn, whose wife, Jackie Mackay, was a master printer from whom Marsden learned the skills of the darkroom.

The first of his works were published in photography periodicals at the end of the seventies. Two grants from the Arts Council of Great Britain in 1975 and 1976 allowed Marsden to undertake extensive journeys throughout Europe, the Middle East, and the United States, photographing the architectural subjects and varied landscapes he encountered.

Marsden's particular interest was "eerie" motifs like graveyards and old ruins, as well as the legends and tales that are often connected with these places. Yet the gloomy atmosphere of Marsden's pictures is not based on careful choice of the motifs alone, but to the same degree on Marsden's photography technique, which included the use of infrared film.

Marsden's photographs already became world-famous and are exhibited at a large number of museums. Marsden released various illustrated books, and completed a variety of remittance works.

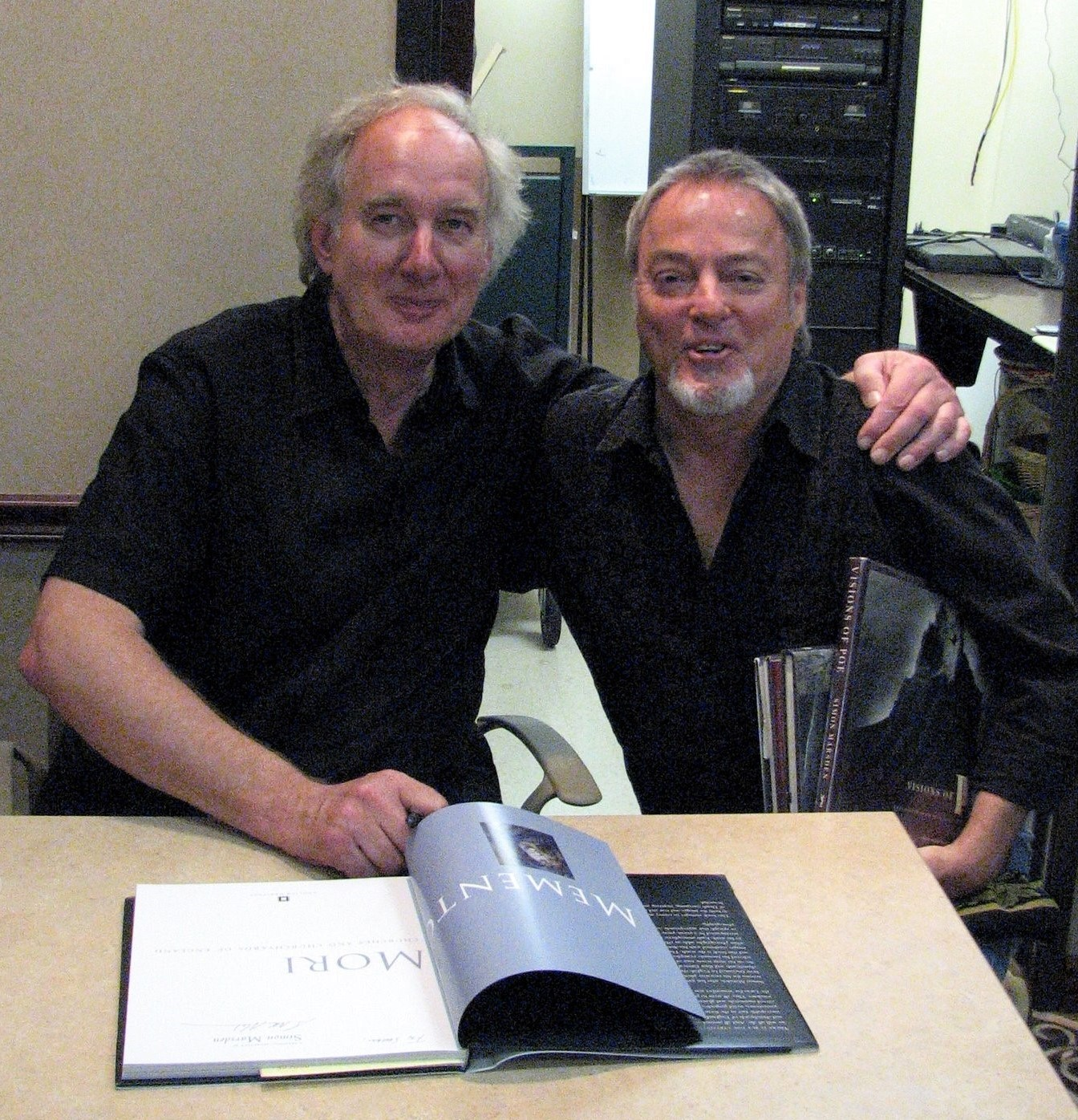
Simon Marsden and mentalist Mark Edward in 2009.

In 2003 Simon Marsden collaborated with director Jason Figgis on The Twilight Hour – Visions of Ireland's Haunted Past. The documentary was written and presented by Marsden and featured narration by Sir John Hurt. It was nominated for two Irish Film and TV Academy Awards, was screened on Ireland's national broadcaster RTE as part of their Arts Lives series and ran for three years on Discovery Civilisations across 100 countries. It was later released on DVD.

Following Marsden's death, Figgis wrote and directed a documentary about Simon's life and work entitled Simon Marsden: A Life in Pictures. It received its world premiere at the BFI in London on 16 August 2018. The documentary is due to be released on DVD in October 2021.

== Personal life ==
Simon Marsden succeeded in the baronetcy in 1997 upon the death of his elder brother, Nigel.

He married firstly, in 1970, to Catherine Thérèsa Windsor-Lewis. The marriage was dissolved in 1978. He married secondly, in 1984, to Cassie Stanton, with whom he had a son and a daughter. He is succeeded in the baronetcy by his son, Tadgh (born 1990). The family lived in an old rectory near Market Rasen on the Lincolnshire Wolds. Simon Marsden died on 22 January 2012, aged 63, from heart failure.

== Work (selection) ==
- In Ruins, 1980
- The Haunted Realm, 1986
- Visions of Poe, 1988
- Phantoms of the Isles, 1990
- The Journal of a Ghosthunter, 1994
- Beyond the Wall, 1999
- Venice: City of Haunting Dreams, 2001
- The Twilight Hour: Celtic Visions from the Past, 2002
- This Spectred Isle: A Journey through Haunted England, 2005
- Ghosthunter: A Journey Through Haunted France, 2006
- Memento Mori: Churches and Churchyards of England, 2007

== Permanent collections ==
- J. Paul Getty Museum (Malibu)
- Bibliothèque nationale de France (Paris)
- Victoria and Albert Museum (London)
- Arts Council England
- Saatchi Gallery (London)

Baronetage of the United Kingdom
Preceded by Nigel Marsden	Baronet (of Grimsby); 1997–2012	Succeeded by Tadgh Marsden
