= Fig Rig =

Stabilization device for handheld film cameras

Fig Rig refers to a circular, handheld device used to stabilize and control a small film camera to catch motion while also reducing the chances of shaky footage. A fig rig allows a director or photographer to have more control over their chosen filming device and results in more stable film footage.

== History ==
In an interview conducted by the Directors Guild of America, Mike Figgis, an English film director, discusses his experience and the hassles that came about when dealing with tripods and film dollies on set. Figgis decided that he needed something to stabilize his camera without taking up valuable workspace on a hectic set. With the help of designer Ben Wilson and inventor Cline Sinclair, Figgis developed the idea of a device that would create a stabilized film shot by gripping the handled sides and holding it still or moving it slowly. The concept initially started as a pair of handle bars with the camera sitting in the middle, but later evolved to a circular frame with the camera mount in the center.

== Physical appearance ==
The main body of a fig rig has a similar diameter to a steering wheel, providing enough space in the middle to place the film camera as well as being comfortable for the user to hold. The circular frame is typically made of a lightweight metal which allows the film camera to be properly supported as well as light enough to hold. A little below the center of the circular frame, there is a rod where the film camera can be mounted securely. On opposite sides of the circular frame, there are two handles, typically padded, to allow the user to comfortably grip the fig rig.

The fig rig has become an important instrument when filming steady shots. While Manfrotto, an Italian camera brand, has commercialized the fig rig, it hasn't stopped amateur film makers from replicating them. A fig rig can easily be made using common household items like pvc pipe.
