= Compulsion (Hutson novel) =

2001 novel by Shaun Hutson

- Author: Shaun Hutson
- Language: English
- Genre: Horror novel
- Publisher: Macmillan
- Publication date: 2001
- Publication place: United Kingdom
- Media type: Print
- Pages: 200 pp
- ISBN: 0-333-73723-7
- OCLC: 49691082

Compulsion (2001) is a horror novel written by Shaun Hutson.

== Plot summary ==
A gang of teenage youngsters is running riot on the streets. Responsible for a number of burglaries and car thefts, the police are at their wits' end trying to put a stop to the gang's activities. Terror and hatred have become part of everyday life for local residents and, just when it seems things cannot get any worse, the gang targets Shelby House – an old people's home. Supervisor Veronica Porter, her two staff and the nine elderly residents become the gang's most vulnerable victims yet as the thugs conduct a hate campaign against them, sending abusive mail, daubing graffiti on walls and shattering windows. The intimidation escalates until Veronica's own father is dragged into the scene of terror when, disturbing some of the gang members burgling his house he is put into a coma. But enough is enough. The senior citizens of Shelby House decide to take the law into their own hands and fight back.

== Reception ==
The book received mostly positive reviews.
