= The Guitar (film) =

2008 film directed by Amy Redford

- Promotional film poster
- Directed by: Amy Redford
- Written by: Amos Poe
- Produced by: Amy Redford; Heyward Collins; Bob Jason; Amos Poe; Brad Zions
- Starring: Saffron Burrows
- Cinematography: Bobby Bukowski
- Edited by: David Leonard
- Music by: David Mansfield
- Production companies: Applecreek Productions; RedGuitar; Breakout Pictures; Artists / Media Cooperation; Cold Fusion Media Group
- Distributed by: Lightning Media
- Release date: November 7, 2008
- Running time: 95 minutes
- Country: United States
- Language: English

The Guitar is a 2008 American drama film directed and co-produced by Amy Redford. It stars Saffron Burrows as a woman who decides to pursue her dreams after being diagnosed with a terminal disease, fired from her job and abandoned by her boyfriend.

== Plot ==
Melody "Mel" Wilder is diagnosed with laryngeal cancer. She is fired from her job and abandoned by her boyfriend. With nothing left to lose, and given only two months to live, she spends her life's savings to rent a palatial loft in Greenwich Village. Thinking she will never have to pay the landlord, she lives off her credit cards, and fills the loft with high-priced products. She seduces the parcel-delivery man and a pizza delivery girl and teaches herself to play the electric guitar she has romanticized since childhood. These life affirming experiences transform her irrevocably, as she discovers a passion for life and the will to live.

== Reception ==
As of June 2020, The Guitar holds a 33% approval rating on Rotten Tomatoes, based on 18 reviews with an average rating of 4.62/10.

== Cast ==
- Saffron Burrows as Melody Wilder
- Isaach De Bankolé as Roscoe Wasz
- Paz de la Huerta as Constance 'Cookie' Clemente
- Mia Kucan as Young Mel
- Adam Trese as Mr. Laffs
- Janeane Garofalo as Dr. Murray
- Elizabeth Marvel as Ma Wilder
- Bill Camp as Pa Wilder
- William Leroy as Billy
- Larry Block as Mr. Faddis
