= The Loss of Sexual Innocence =

- Film poster
- Directed by: Mike Figgis
- Written by: Mike Figgis
- Produced by: Mike Figgis; Annie Stewart
- Starring: Julian Sands; Saffron Burrows; Stefano Dionisi; Kelly Macdonald; Jonathan Rhys Meyers
- Cinematography: Benoît Delhomme
- Edited by: Matthew Wood
- Music by: Mike Figgis
- Production companies: Summit Entertainment; Newmarket Capital Group; New Line Cinema (uncredited); Red Mullet Inc.
- Distributed by: Sony Pictures Classics (Select territories); Summit Entertainment (Overseas)
- Release date: 28 May 1999
- Running time: 106 minutes
- Countries: United States; United Kingdom
- Language: English
- Budget: $3.5 million
- Box office: $400,000

The Loss of Sexual Innocence is a 1999 drama film written and directed by Mike Figgis. It tells the story of the sexual development of a filmmaker through three stages of his life, in a non-linear and disjointed manner. The film stars British actress Saffron Burrows, whom Figgis dated for several years.

== Plot ==
The story at the center of the movie is the tumultuous life of Nic (Julian Sands), a British director beginning a new film project in Tunisia.

== Cast ==
- Julian Sands as adult Nic
  - Jonathan Rhys Meyers as Nic, aged 16
- Saffron Burrows as English/Italian twin
- Stefano Dionisi as Luca
- Kelly Macdonald as Susan
- Gina McKee as Susan's mother
- Bernard Hill as Susan's father
- Rossy de Palma as Blind woman
- Justin Chadwick as Flash Man
- Femi Ogunbanjo as Adam
- Hanne Klintoe as Eve

== Production ==
The Loss of Sexual Innocence was based on Short Stories, a script Figgis had written in 1982. His original concept was to have been a multimedia show featuring film, live performance and music. The success of Leaving Las Vegas allowed him to finance the making of the nearly two-decades-old cinematic project.

== Reception ==
On the review aggregator website Rotten Tomatoes, 47% of 30 critics' reviews are positive. Metacritic, which uses a weighted average, assigned the film a score of 42 out of 100, based on 27 critics, indicating "mixed or average" reviews.

Stephen Holden of The New York Times wrote, "Those with no patience for avant-garde films will want to avoid The Loss of Sexual Innocence...Everyone else will find moments of surpassing beauty in this courageous, deeply flawed film." He was effusive in his praise for Figgis creating the film's atmosphere "through its mixture of music, beautiful outdoor cinematography and somber, silent acting." What he considered flaws were the Adam and Eve storyline and two scenes which he considered irrelevant involving an airport encounter between identical twins separated at birth and the humiliation of an obese 12-year-old Nic by a gym teacher.

Like Holden, Roger Ebert delineated what type of movie it is by explaining it as "an 'art film,' which means it tries to do something more advanced than most commercial films (which tell stories simple enough for children, in images shocking enough for adults)." He rated it three and a half out of four stars, adding that it "plays like a musical composition, with themes drifting in and out, and dialogue used more for tone than speech....Not all of it works, but you play along, because it's rare to find a film this ambitious."

Taking a more playful approach in his review, Jeff Millar of the Houston Chronicle came to a similar conclusion as Holden and Ebert and explained, "If you are an adventurous filmgoer, interested in technique, certainly go. If you like stories with 'stories,' which go from Point A to Point B with conflicts along the way, this film may be a little too atonal for you."

Emanuel Levy of Variety was critical of the movie as commentary on Nic’s loss of innocence and the entire state of civilization, stating that "it’s in this intent that the film fails most conspicuously, giving Figgis’ skeptics the strongest ammunition to dismiss his work as pretentious and overreaching." Desson Howe of The Washington Post was more scathing in his analysis and declared, "For me, at least, The Loss of Sexual Innocence is the highly cinematic equivalent of a smoke-and-mirrors job."

== Soundtrack ==
Original Motion Picture Soundtrack: The Loss of Sexual Innocence

Soundtrack album by various artists
- Released: 1999
- Genres: Postmodern, classical
- Length: 65:48
- Label: Philips
- Producer: Mike Figgis

Soundtrack album listing

No.	Title	Writer(s)	Performed by	Length
1.	"Africa"	Mike Figgis	Mike Figgis	4:24
2.	"Der Dichter Spricht"	Robert Schumann	Joanna MacGregor	2:10
3.	"Doppelgänger"	Mike Figgis	Mike Figgis	2:06
4.	"Traumerie"	Robert Schumann	Joanna MacGregor	2:47
5.	"Tango"	Mike Figgis	Mike Figgis	7:08
6.	"Nocturne In E Flat Major, Op. 9, No. 2"	Frédéric Chopin	Joanna MacGregor	4:56
7.	"Twins"	Mike Figgis	Mike Figgis	6:40
8.	"Piano Sonata In C, kv. 545, The Ardento Section"	Wolfgang Amadeus Mozart	Joanna MacGregor	5:29
9.	"Tree of Knowledge"	Mike Figgis	Mike Figgis	4:05
10.	"Pathetique Sonata - 1st Movement(excerpt)"	Ludwig van Beethoven	Joanna MacGregor	4:26
11.	"Dukes Award"	Mike Figgis	Mike Figgis	1:58
12.	"Moonlight Sonata - 1st Movement (excerpt)"	Ludwig van Beethoven	Joanna MacGregor	5:51
13.	"Accident"	Mike Figgis	Mike Figgis	2:30
14.	"Loss of Sexual Innocence"	Mike Figgis	Mike Figgis	2:59
15.	"An Eye For An Eye"	Mike Figgis	Mike Figgis	1:21
16.	"Symphony No. 9 - Allegro Ma Non Tanto (excerpt)"	Ludwig van Beethoven	Royal Philharmonic Orchestra	1:44
17.	"Nocturne In D Flat Major, Op. 27, No. 2"	Frédéric Chopin	Joanna MacGregor	5:14
