= Marsden baronets =

Baronetcy in the Baronetage of the United Kingdom

The Marsden Baronetcy, of Grimsby in the County of Lincoln, is a title in the Baronetage of the United Kingdom. It was created on 4 March 1924 for John Marsden. He was Principal of Consolidated Fisheries Ltd, of Grimsby. As of 2014 the title is held by his great-grandson, the fifth Baronet, who succeeded his father in 2012.

As of 28 February 2014 the Baronet had not proven his succession and was therefore not on the Official Roll of the Baronetage, with the baronetcy considered dormant since 2012.

== Marsden baronets, of Grimsby (1924) ==
- Sir John Denton Marsden, 1st Baronet (1873–1944)
- Sir John Denton Marsden, 2nd Baronet (1913–1985)
- Sir Nigel John Denton Marsden, 3rd Baronet (1940–1997)
- Sir Simon Neville Llewelyn Marsden, 4th Baronet (1948–2012)
- Sir Tadgh Orlando Denton Marsden, 5th Baronet (born 1990)

There is no heir to the baronetcy.
