= Saffron Burrows =

British actress (born 1972)

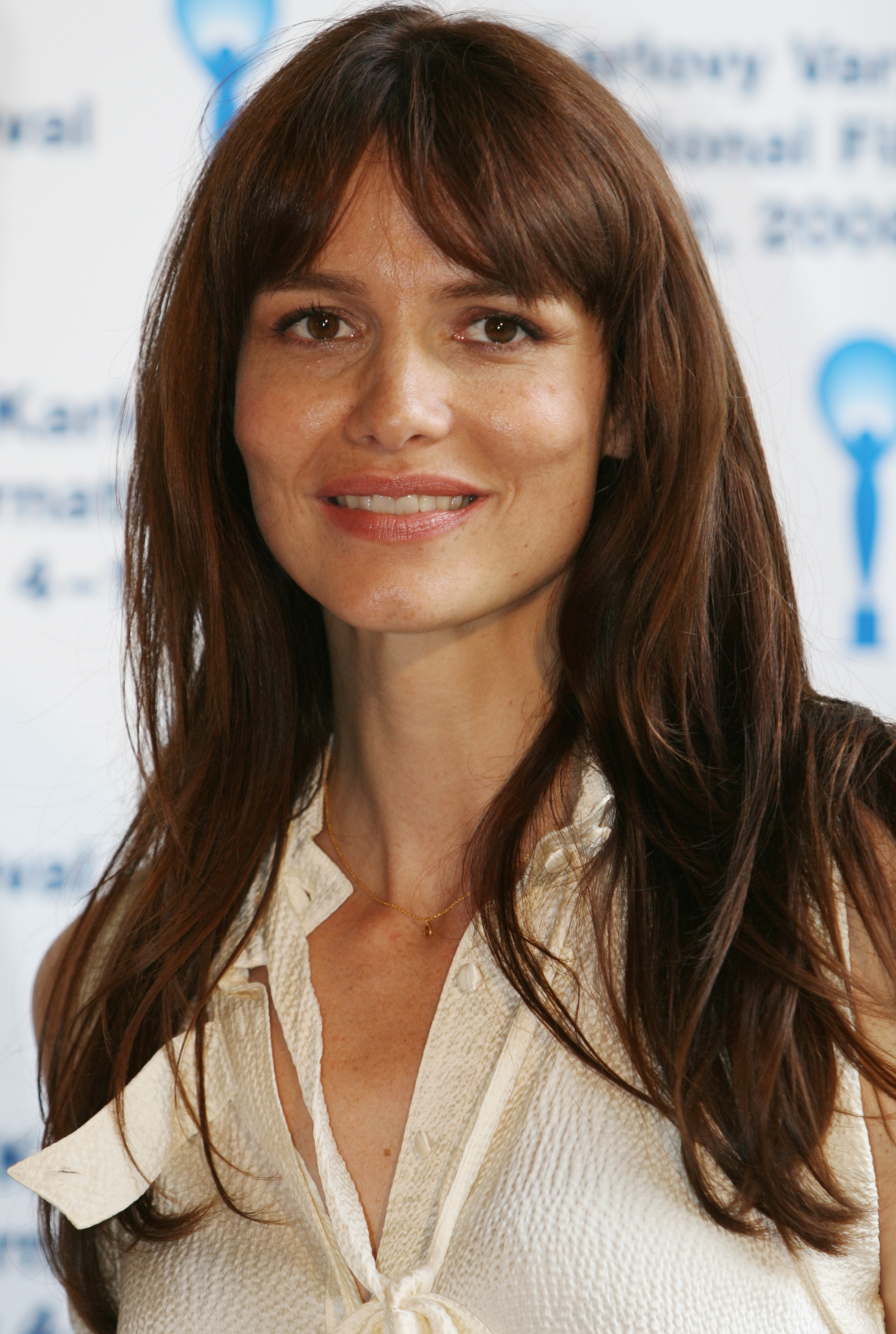
- Burrows at 43rd Karlovy Vary International Film Festival in 2008
- Born: 22 October 1972 (age 54); St Pancras, London, England
- Citizenship: United Kingdom; United States
- Occupations: Actress; model
- Years active: 1991–present
- Spouse: Alison Balian (m. 2013; sep. 2020)
- Partner: Mike Figgis (1997-2002)
- Children: 2

Saffron Burrows (born 22 October 1972) is a British actress who has appeared in films such as Circle of Friends, Wing Commander, Deep Blue Sea, Gangster No. 1, Enigma, Troy, Reign Over Me, and The Bank Job. On the small screen she starred as Lorraine Weller on Boston Legal, Dr. Norah Skinner on My Own Worst Enemy, Detective Serena Stevens on Law & Order: Criminal Intent, and Victoria Hand on Agents of S.H.I.E.L.D.. She appeared as Cynthia Taylor on the Prime Video series Mozart in the Jungle and as Dottie Quinn in the Netflix series You.

== Early life ==
Saffron Burrows was born in St Pancras in central London and grew up in Stoke Newington. Her mother is a trade unionist and primary school teacher in Hackney and her father is an architect and teacher. Her parents and stepfather were Socialist Workers Party members, and Burrows was politically active from a young age.

Burrows attended William Tyndale Primary School in Islington and then Stoke Newington School in Stoke Newington. When asked for her preference of a school in Hackney or Hampstead, she said she wanted to be in a multicultural and inclusive environment. She enrolled in acting classes at the Anna Scher Theatre in Islington when she was 11.

Burrows had a successful modelling career after she was discovered at age 15 in Covent Garden by fashion photographer Beth Boldt. For five years she divided her time between London and Paris, where she learned French. She found the modelling world's "obsession with the ideal of the body" troubling.

== Career ==
=== Acting ===
Burrows made her film debut in 1993 with a small role in Jim Sheridan's In the Name of the Father. Her first significant acting roles came in 1995, as an ambitious young Irishwoman in Circle of Friends, and in Ngozi Onwurah's Welcome II The Terrordome. In 1996 she starred in the BBC production of Dennis Potter's Karaoke and in Hotel de Love; the next year she was seen in Lovelife, Nevada, The Matchmaker and Mike Figgis's One Night Stand. In 1999 she appeared in Figgis's experimental film The Loss of Sexual Innocence, in which she played twins – one raised in England, the other in Italy. In 1999, she appeared in the thriller Deep Blue Sea, and had the title role in Figgis's film adaptation Miss Julie, which premiered at the Toronto International Film Festival. She starred for Figgis again alongside Stellan Skarsgård in Timecode (2000), a split-screen digital experimental film shot in a single take with no edits. She followed it with Gangster No. 1, starring Malcolm McDowell, Paul Bettany and David Thewlis. She next co-starred with Kate Winslet and Dougray Scott in Michael Apted's 1940s drama Enigma and starred in Tempted, an improvised thriller set in New Orleans, with Burt Reynolds and Peter Facinelli.

Figgis's ensemble feature Hotel followed, reuniting Burrows with colleagues from Timecode including Salma Hayek and Danny Huston on location in Venice, where she played the Duchess of Malfi. She had a cameo in Frida, Hayek's 2002 biopic of artist Frida Kahlo. Burrows performed in Spanish in The Galindez File, a film written by Spanish novelist Vazquez Montalban, about a woman seeking the truth about the disappearance of a critic of the Dominican dictator Trujillo. In 2004, she played the role of Andromache, the wife of Trojan Prince Hector, played by Eric Bana, in Troy.

Burrows dedicated herself to stage work in the early 2000s. She appeared at the Royal National Theatre in Jeanette Winterson's The Powerbook, directed by Deborah Warner; the play also went on tour, visiting the Theatre National Du Chaillot in Paris and the Teatro Argentina in Rome. In January 2005, she created the role of Janey Morris in the world premiere of Earthly Paradise at the Almeida Theatre. The play centered on the love triangle of Janey, her husband William Morris (the writer and proponent of the Arts and Crafts movement), and the Pre-Raphaelite painter Dante Gabriel Rossetti. London theatre critic Nicholas De Jongh said of her performance: "Burrows takes to the stage like a swan to water ... She deserves no end of watching." On 30 October 2005, she appeared on stage at the Old Vic theatre in London in a rehearsed reading of the 24-hour play Night Sky, alongside Christopher Eccleston. Burrow has since participated in the "24 Hour Plays" in New York and Los Angeles.

In 2006, Burrows was the female lead in the New Zealand thriller Perfect Creature, appeared in Hal Hartley's film Fay Grim, and co-starred in Klimt, Chilean director Raoul Ruiz' cinematic portrait of Gustav Klimt. Burrows played opposite John Malkovich as the artist's lover, a woman of many personalities and nationalities. Onstage in 2006, she starred opposite David Schwimmer in the world premiere of Neil LaBute's Some Girl(s) at the Gielgud Theatre, London. She then appeared in Mike Binder's film Reign Over Me with Don Cheadle and Adam Sandler. Burrows also had lead roles in the Indian thriller Broken Thread and in director Peter Howitt's drama Dangerous Parking. On television, she played attorney Lorraine Weller on ABC's Boston Legal (season 4) from 2007 to 2008. She starred in the NBC series My Own Worst Enemy in 2008.

Also in 2008, Burrows starred in the independent film The Guitar as a woman who suffers several life setbacks all at once, including a cancer diagnosis and bankruptcy, and survives them all. Amy Redford's directorial debut, the film premiered at the Sundance Film Festival. She also had a starring role in Roger Donaldson's heist film The Bank Job, and appeared opposite Kevin Spacey in Jonas Pate's Shrink. She contributed to an Actors Come Clean for Congo video for the Enough Project's campaign in support of conflict mineral issues. In 2010, she starred as Detective Serena Stevens on Law & Order: Criminal Intent, departing at the end of the ninth season. In September 2010, she took part in the documentary feature The People Speak, televised on the History Channel. The film was directed and produced by Colin Firth and Anthony Arnove. Burrows modelled for Marks & Spencer's autumn 2010 campaign for their Portfolio range. In 2012, she performed opposite Rob Lowe in the political comedy Knife Fight.

In 2013 and 2014, Burrows joined the ABC television show Agents of S.H.I.E.L.D., part of the Marvel Cinematic Universe. She played agent Victoria Hand in a recurring role. She then starred in the Amazon Video series Mozart in the Jungle as Cynthia Taylor, a cellist with the New York Symphony. The series ran for four seasons from 2014 to 2018. In 2019, Burrows starred in the recurring role of Dottie Quinn on the second season of the Netflix thriller You. She reprised her role in the third season, which was released in October 2021.

In July 2026, Burrows guest-starred in the fourth season premiere of Star Trek: Strange New Worlds as Martian Commander Cassell.

=== Writing ===
Burrows has written diaries, book reviews and newspaper and magazine articles for The Guardian, The Independent, and The Times and the New Statesman.

== Personal life ==
Burrows is a Fellow of the Royal Society of Arts. She is bisexual, and said that she "prefers the company of women". She was engaged to actor Alan Cumming in the 1990s and dated director Mike Figgis for five years until 2002. She was previously in a relationship with actress Fiona Shaw. Burrows married writer Alison Balian, her girlfriend of six years, in August 2013. Burrows gave birth to their first child in 2012 and their daughter in 2017. Burrows and Balian separated in 2020.

Burrows has expressed sympathy for European-style social democracies and for French Socialist politician Ségolène Royal. She joined an anti-racism group when she was 11 years old and went on to become the Vice President of the National Civil Rights Movement. Burrows is a campaigner for disabled rights and equality. In 2009, she became an American citizen.

== Filmography ==
=== Film ===
Year	Title	Role	Notes
1991	The Body Beautiful	Model	Short film
1993	In the Name of the Father	Girl in Commune	
1995	Welcome II the Terrordome	Jodie	
1995	Circle of Friends	Nan Mahon	
1995	The Big One	Jules	
1996	Hotel de Love	Melissa Morrison	
1997	Lovelife	Zoey	
1997	Nevada	Quinn	
1997	One Night Stand	Supermodel	
1997	The MatchMaker	Moira Kennedy Kelly	
1999	Wing Commander	Lieutenant Commander "Angel" Deveraux	
1999	The Loss of Sexual Innocence	English/Italian twin	
1999	Deep Blue Sea	Dr. Susan McCallister	
1999	Miss Julie	Miss Julie	
2000	Assumptions	Ruby	Short film
2000	Timecode	Emma Green	
2000	Gangster No. 1	Karen	
2001	Enigma	Claire Romilly	
2001	Tempted	Lilly LeBlanc	
2001	The Seventh Stream	Mairead	
2001	Hotel	Duchess of Malfi	
2002	Frida	Grace	
2002	Flashpoint	Dara	
2002	Hideous Man		Short film
2003	The Galíndez File	Muriel Colber	
2003	Peter Pan	Narrator/Adult Wendy Darling	Voice
2004	Krug	Grace Krug	Short film
2004	Troy	Andromache	
2004	Terrible Kisses	Woman	Short film
2006	Perfect Creature	Captain Lilly Squires	
2006	Klimt	Lea de Castro	
2006	Fay Grim	Juliet	
2007	Broken Thread	Jenny	
2007	Reign Over Me	Donna Remar	
2007	Dangerous Parking	Claire Matteson	
2008	The Guitar	Melody Wilder	
2008	The Bank Job	Martine Love	
2009	Shrink	Kate Amberson	
2009	The Eastmans	Dr. Anna Eastman	
2010	Lawyers	Anne	Short film
2012	Small Apartments	Francine	
2012	Knife Fight	Sophia Becker	
2015	Quitters	Veronica	
2023	Dangerous Waters	Alma	
2023	Baghead	Catherine	
2024	Canary Black	Elizabeth Mills	
2026	The Morrigan	Fiona	
TBA	The Sacrifice †		Post-production

=== Television ===
Year	Title	Role	Notes
1992	Les cinq dernières minutes	Daisy Smith	Episode: "Meurtre en Ardèche"
1993	Full Stretch		Episode: "Family Affairs"
1996	Karaoke	Sandra Sollars	
1996	Cold Lazarus	Sandra Sollars	
1996	Crucial Tales	Sarah Brown	Episode: "I Bring You Frankincense"
2007–2008	Boston Legal	Lorraine Weller	20 episodes
2008	Wainy Days	Lucy	Episode: "Nan and Lucy"
2008	Agatha Christie's Marple	Audrey Strange	Episode: "Towards Zero"
2008	My Own Worst Enemy	Dr. Norah Skinner	9 episodes
2009	Kings	Death	Episode: "The Sabbath Queen" (episode 8)
2009	The Eastmans	Dr. Anna Eastman	Unsold pilot
2010	Law & Order: Criminal Intent	Det. Serena Stevens	15 episodes (Season 9)
2011	Bones	Ike Latulippe	Episode: "The Finder" (season 6 episode 19)
2013	The Crazy Ones	Helena	Season 1 Episode 5: "She's So European"
2013–2014	Agents of S.H.I.E.L.D.	Victoria Hand	4 episodes
2014–2018	Mozart in the Jungle	Cynthia Taylor	Series regular
2019	Elementary	Ruby Carville	Season 7 Episode 1: "The Further Adventures"
2019–2021; 2025	You	Dottie Quinn	Recurring role (Season 2); Main cast (Season 3); Guest (Season 5) (12 episodes)
2022	Westworld	Anastasia Whitney	Season 4 Episode 2: "Well Enough Alone"
2026	Star Trek: Strange New Worlds	Commander Cassell	Season 4 Episode 1: "Valles Marineris"

== Awards and nominations ==
Blockbuster Entertainment Award

- 2000: Nominated, "Favorite Newcomer Actress" – Deep Blue Sea

Screen Actors Guild Awards

- 2008: Nominated, "Outstanding Performance by an Ensemble in a Drama Series" – Boston Legal
- 2009: Nominated, "Outstanding Performance by an Ensemble in a Drama Series" – Boston Legal
