= Figge =

Figge is a surname. Occasionally it is a diminutive of the given name "Fredrik". Notable people with the name include:

== Surname ==
- Erika Figge, an American water polo player
- Alex Figge, an American race car driver
- Jennifer Figge, female swimmer, allegedly the first woman to swim the Atlantic Ocean
- Jochen Figge
- Sarah Figge
- William Figge

== Given name ==
- Figge Boström, a Swedish musician
- Figge Norling

== See also ==
- Figge Art Museum in Davenport, Iowa
- Figgis
- Figes
