= Miss Julie (1999 film) =

- Theatrical poster
- Directed by: Mike Figgis
- Screenplay by: Helen Cooper
- Based on: Miss Julie by August Strindberg
- Produced by: Harriet Cruickshank; Mike Figgis
- Starring: Saffron Burrows; Peter Mullan
- Cinematography: Benoît Delhomme
- Edited by: Matthew Wood
- Music by: Mike Figgis
- Production company: United Artists
- Distributed by: MGM Distribution Co. (United States); Optimum Releasing (United Kingdom)
- Release date: 10 December 1999
- Running time: 103 minutes
- Countries: United States; United Kingdom
- Language: English

Miss Julie is a 1999 film directed by Mike Figgis based on the 1888 play by August Strindberg, starring Saffron Burrows in the role of Miss Julie and Peter Mullan in the role of Jean.

== Plot ==
Midsummer night, 1894, in northern Sweden. The complex structures of class bind a man and a woman. Miss Julie, the inexperienced but imperious daughter of the manor, deigns to dance at the servants' party. She's also drawn to Jean, a footman who has travelled, speaks well, and doesn't kowtow. He is engaged to Christine, a servant, and while she sleeps, Jean and Miss Julie talk through the night in the kitchen.

For part of the night it's a power struggle, for part it's the baring of souls, and by dawn, they want to break the chains of class and leave Sweden together. When Christine wakes and goes off to church, Jean and Miss Julie have their own decisions to make.

== Cast ==
- Saffron Burrows as Miss Julie
- Peter Mullan as Jean
- Maria Doyle Kennedy as Christine
- Tam Dean Burn as servant
- Heathcote Williams as servant
- Joanna Page as servant
