= Elina Duni =

Albanian jazz singer and composer

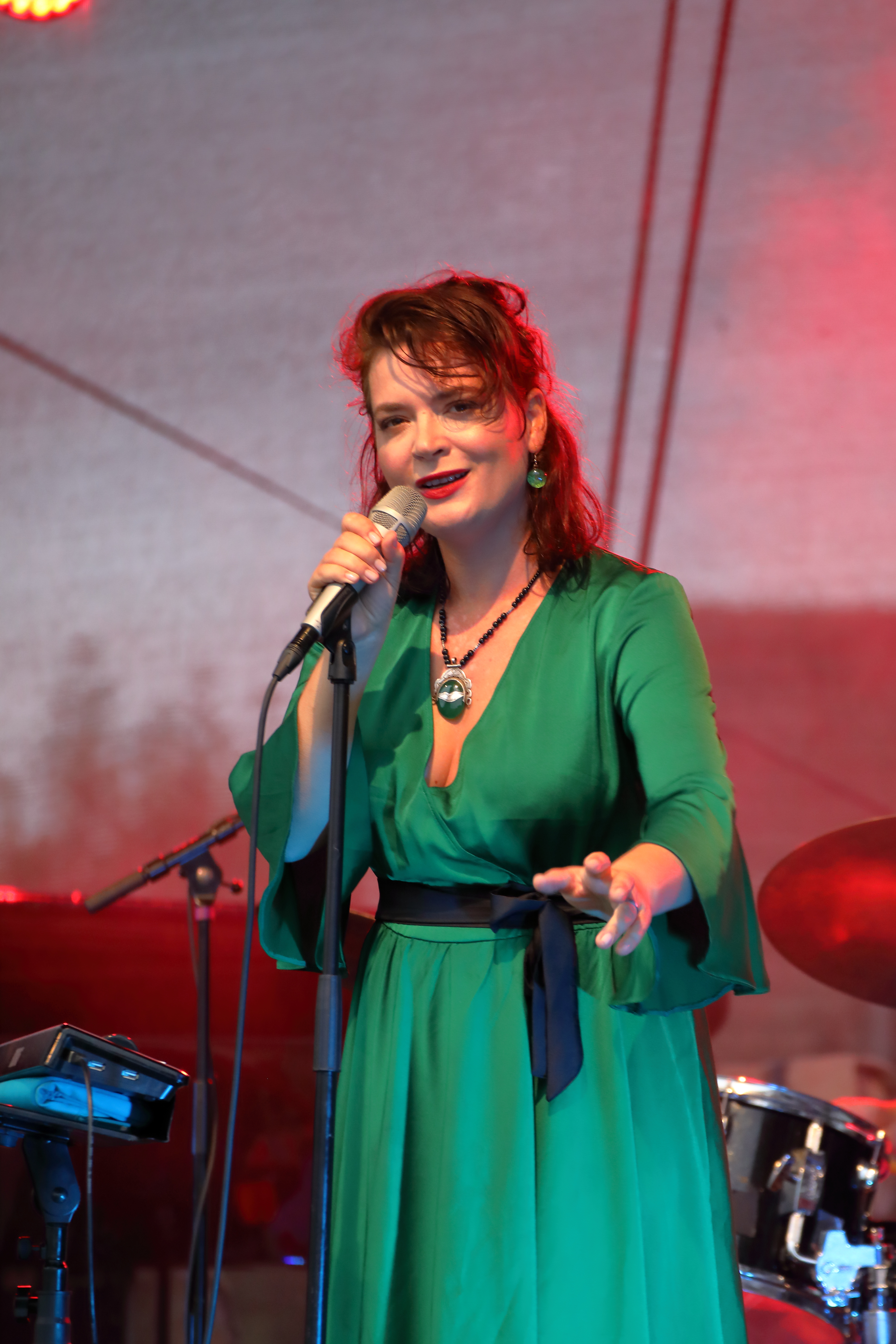
Elina Duni during a concert

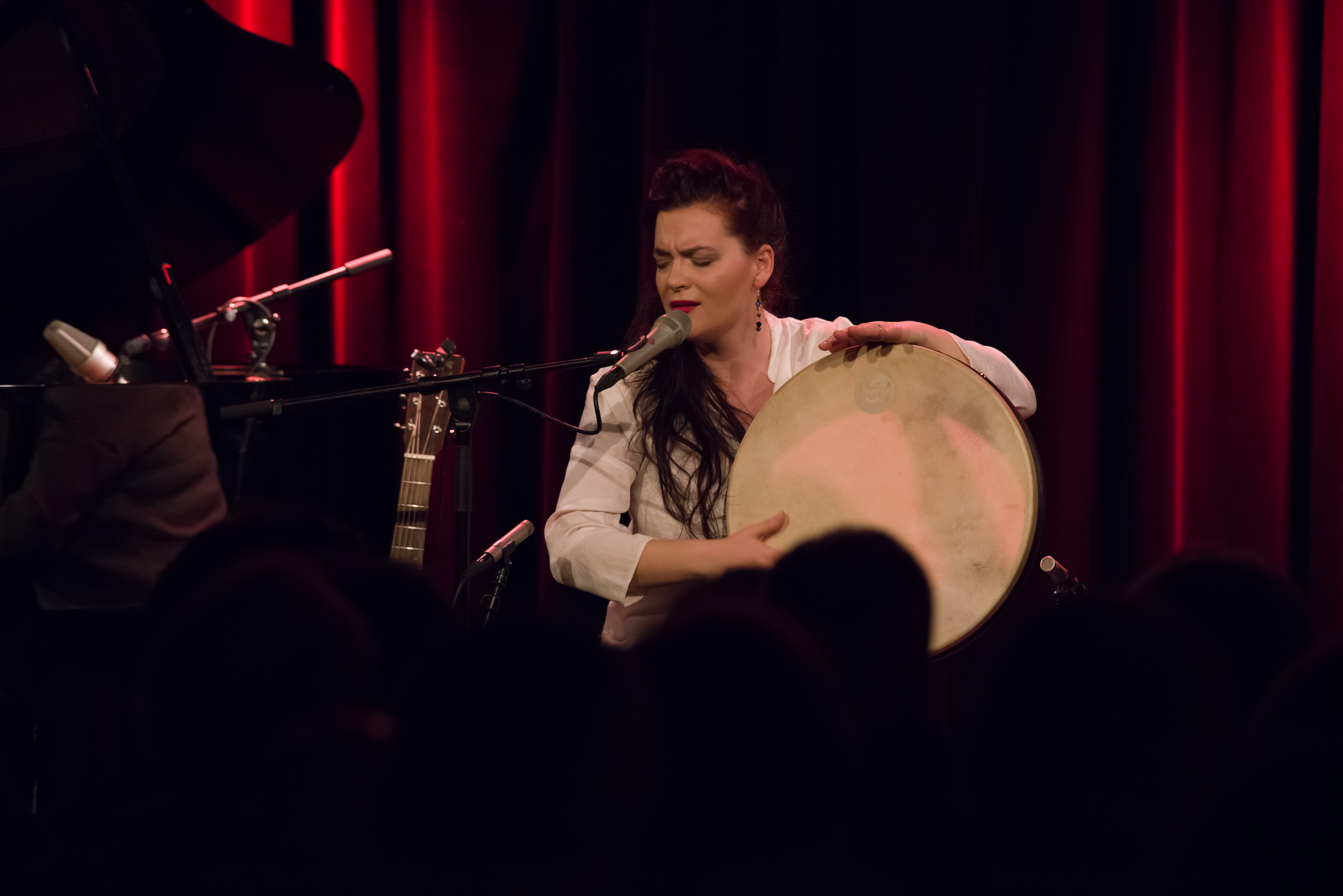
Elina Duni playing the tambourine during a concert in Biel, Switzerland

Elina Duni (born 10 March 1981, Tirana, Albania) is a Swiss-Albanian jazz singer and composer. She left Albania at the age of ten to live and study in Geneva, Switzerland. She went on to study singing, composition, and teaching at the University of the Arts Bern, but from 2004 onward, Albanian folk music became a primary influence. In 2004, she formed a quartet under her own name with Swiss jazz pianist Colin Vallon, bassist Patrice Moret, and drummer Norbert Pfammatter. In a review, John Fordham concluded that "This quartet definitely sounds like rising star material for ECM."

After two albums—Baresha (2008) and Lume Lume (2010)—on Meta Records, the quartet went on to record for ECM in 2012, releasing Matanë Malit (Beyond the Mountain), followed by Dallëndyshe (Swallow) in 2015. In 2014, she released her first album as a singer-songwriter in Kosovo and Albania, titled Muza e Zezë (The Black Muse). In 2017, she was nominated for the annual Swiss Music Prize, and in 2018, she released the album Partir, a solo project in which she accompanies herself on piano, acoustic guitar, and percussion. The album features traditional folk songs from across the globe, sung in nine different languages.

Duni lives in Zurich, Switzerland, and collaborates with British guitarist Rob Luft, with whom she has released several albums on ECM Records. The 2020 album Lost Ships comprises six Duni/Luft originals and six interpretations. The supporting musicians include Matthieu Michel on flugelhorn and multi-instrumentalist Fred Thomas on piano and percussion. Their second collaborative album, A Time to Remember, was named Jazz Album of the Month by The Guardian, with John Fordham describing it as a sonically "delicate yet diamond bright" listening experience.

== Discography ==
- 2007 - Baresha
- 2010 - Lume, Lume
- 2012 - Matanë Malit
- 2014 - Muza e zezë (The Black Muse)
- 2015 - Dallëndyshe
- 2018 - Partir
- 2019 - Aksham
- 2020 - Lost Ships (with Rob Luft)
- 2023 - A Time To Remember (with Rob Luft)
- 2026 - Reaching for the Moon (with Rob Luft)
