= Mike Figgis =

English filmmaker and composer (born 1948)

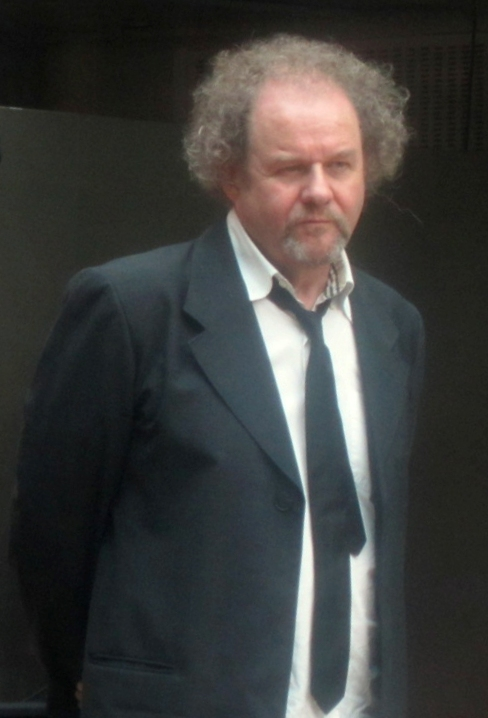
- Figgis at the 2011 Deloitte Ignite
- Born: Michael Lawrence Dundus Figgis; 28 February 1948 (age 78); Carlisle, Cumberland, England
- Education: UCL Institute of Education
- Occupations: Film director; screenwriter; composer; musician
- Years active: 1984–present
- Children: 2
- Relatives: Jonathan Figgis (cousin); Susie Figgis (cousin)
- Musical career
- Genres: Avant-garde; free jazz; pop; film score
- Occupations: Composer; multi-instrumentalist
- Instruments: Trumpet; guitar; keyboard; synthesizer
- Member of: The People Show

Michael Lawrence Dundus Figgis (born 28 February 1948) is an English filmmaker, musician, and composer. He received Academy Award nominations for Best Director and Best Adapted Screenplay for his 1995 film Leaving Las Vegas. His other notable works include the thrillers Stormy Monday (1988), Internal Affairs (1990), Liebestraum (1993), and Cold Creek Manor (2003); the experimental film Timecode (2000), and several documentaries.

Figgis is also a professor of film studies at the European Graduate School, and was the founding patron of the UK-based independent filmmakers' online community Shooting People.

== Early life ==
Figgis was born in Carlisle, Cumberland, and grew up in Nairobi, Kenya, until he was eight-years-old. The rest of his childhood was spent in Newcastle upon Tyne, where he was educated at Kenton Comprehensive School (the musicians Ian Carr and John Walters were among his teachers there).

Figgis studied music at Trent Park College, then part of the Institute of Education, University of London, where he "lived a lie" for three years – he had, in his words, "bluffed [his] way into the music course without being able to read music", although he later learned how to study harmony, counterpoint and composition.

== Musical career ==
A multi-instrumentalist, Figgis joined the free jazz group the People Band, playing trumpet and guitar on their first record (produced by Charlie Watts) in 1968. He was also the keyboardist for Bryan Ferry's first band, The Gas Board.

The People Band later expanded into the experimental theatre group People Show, of which Figgis was a core member during the 1970s. Figgis' earliest directorial efforts were multimedia stage productions for the People Show, including 1982's Slow Fade. The production was later adapted into a one-hour teleplay called The House, written and directed by Figgis, which aired on Channel 4 in 1984.

== Film career ==
Figgis made his feature film debut with the neo-noir thriller Stormy Monday in 1988. The film earned him attention as a director who could get interesting performances from established Hollywood actors. His first American film was Internal Affairs, which helped to revive the career of Richard Gere. Figgis followed Internal Affairs with Liebestraum, starring Kevin Anderson, Pamela Gidley, Bill Pullman, and Kim Novak. His next Hollywood feature, Mr. Jones, was misunderstood by the studio, who attempted to market the downbeat story as a feelgood film, resulting in a box office flop. Figgis poured his disenchantment with the film industry into Leaving Las Vegas, which starred Nicolas Cage and Elisabeth Shue, which earned Figgis Academy Award nominations for Best Directing and Best Screenplay. He followed this up with the romantic drama One Night Stand, starring Wesley Snipes and Nastassja Kinski, but the movie received a poor response from critics and was a commercial failure. His most ambitious film to date is the low-budget film The Loss of Sexual Innocence, a loosely based autobiographical film of the director himself.

In 2007, Figgis shot Love Live Long set between Istanbul and Bratislava on the infamous Gumball 3000 Rally, starring Sophie Winkleman and Daniel Lapaine. In 2008, he was called upon by Transport for London to help shoot a public information film entitled A Little Thought From Each of Us, A Big Difference For Everyone, encouraging more considerate behaviour on London's public transport systems, which was then shown in London cinemas. The ad comprised the screen split into four sections, each section showing one of four scenarios all on the same double-decker bus. At the end of the ad, the friction-creating scenarios were resolved and the ad ended on "A little thought from each of us. A big difference for everyone."

=== Digital video ===
Forays into digital video technology led Figgis to conceive of and direct Timecode, which took advantage of the technology to create an ensemble film shot simultaneously with four cameras all in one take and also presented simultaneously and uncut, dividing the screen into four-quarters. He returned to the Timecode quad-screen approach for his section of Ten Minutes Older, but has also worked on documentary pieces including a segment of The Blues (called Red, White, and Blues) and a short piece on flamenco. His curiosity with the cinematic use of time has led him to cite Robert Enrico's 1962 film version of An Occurrence at Owl Creek Bridge as an influential film for him. Figgis has a well-documented love-hate relationship with the Hollywood system which leads him to often be an outspoken critic of the system while also despairing the lack of a better alternative. At an appearance at Camerimage in 2005, he expressed the view that filmmaking had become "boring and perhaps need[ed] to become even worse before anything better can emerge" at least in reaction.

At one of the Shooting People events in 2005, he said that filmmaking with a small digital camera made the experience more like painting or novel writing than the movie industry. His fascination with camera technology has also led him to create a camera stabilisation rig for smaller video cameras called the Fig Rig, which places the camera on a platform held within a steering wheel-like system and has since been released by Manfrotto Group.

To promote a new camera phone, Sony Ericsson commissioned Figgis to create Life Captured, a short film made out of mobile phone snapshots taken by 14 people from Europe, the Middle East, and Africa, who were selected to submit a series of photos after winning the global competition.

== Academia ==
Figgis, since 2008, has been professor of film studies at the European Graduate School in Saas-Fee, Switzerland, where he conducts intensive summer seminars.

Figgis was made an Honorary Associate of London Film School.

== Personal life ==
Figgis was previously in a long-term relationship with Saffron Burrows. He is the cousin of film director Jonathan Figgis and the late casting director Susie Figgis.

== Filmography ==
=== Film ===
Year	Title	Director	Writer	Producer	Composer	Notes
1988	Stormy Monday	Yes	Yes	No	Yes	
1990	Internal Affairs	Yes	No	No	Yes	
1991	Liebestraum	Yes	Yes	No	Yes	
1993	Mr. Jones	Yes	No	No	No	
1994	The Browning Version	Yes	No	No	No	
1995	Leaving Las Vegas	Yes	Yes	No	Yes	
1997	One Night Stand	Yes	Yes	Yes	Yes	
1999	The Loss of Sexual Innocence	Yes	Yes	Yes	Yes	
1999	Miss Julie	Yes	No	Yes	Yes	
2000	Timecode	Yes	Yes	Yes	Yes	
2001	Hotel	Yes	Story	Yes	Yes	
2002	Ten Minutes Older	Yes	Yes	No	No	Segment About Time 2
2003	Cold Creek Manor	Yes	No	Yes	Yes	
2008	Love Live Long	Yes	Yes	Yes	Yes	Also cinematographer
2012	Suspension of Disbelief	Yes	Yes	Executive	Yes	Also cinematographer and editor

Documentary film

Year	Title	Notes
1997	Flamenco Women	
2001	The Battle of Orgreave	
2004	Co/Ma	Also executive producer, cinematographer and editor
2017	The Battle of Hastings	
2019	Somebody Up There Likes Me	
2025	Megadoc	Also cinematographer and composer

=== Television ===
Year	Title	Episode
2003	The Blues	"Red, White and Blues"
2004	The Sopranos	"Cold Cuts"
2008	Canterbury's Law	"Pilot" (Also executive producer)
2018	The Affair	"401"

TV movies

Year	Title	Director	Writer	Producer	Composer	Notes
1984	The House	Yes	Yes	No	Yes	
1991	Women & Men 2	Yes	Yes	Yes	Yes	Segment Mara

== Bibliography ==
- Mike Figgis: Collected Screenplays 1 – Stormy Monday, Liebestraum, Leaving Las Vegas (2002)
- Digital Filmmaking (2007)
- The Thirty-Six Dramatic Situations (2017)

== See also ==
- List of Academy Award winners and nominees from Great Britain
