= Kevin Figes =

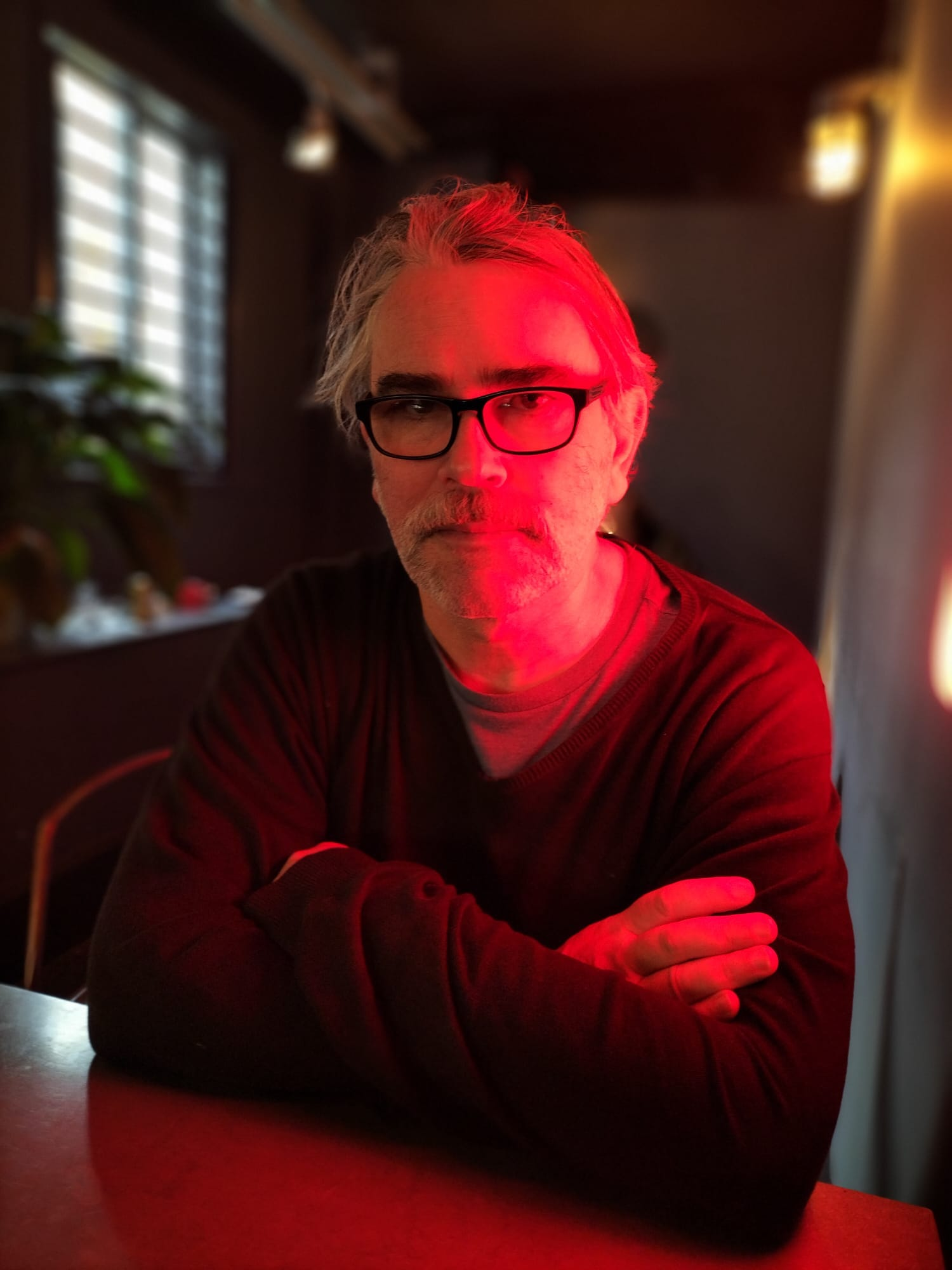

Background information
- Genres: Jazz, contemporary
- Occupations: Performer, composer, tutor, filmmaker
- Instruments: Alto, soprano and baritone saxophone; flute, alto and bass flute
- Labels: Pig Records, Edition Records
- Website: www.kevinfiges.co.uk

Kevin Figes is a British saxophonist, flutist, bandleader, composer and filmmaker based in Bristol.

Figes began playing the saxophone in 1986 at the age of 22, studying with Elton Dean in London and later attended the Guildhall School of Music and Drama, studying with Tim Garland. He had a notable association performing and recording with Keith Tippett.

In the early 1990s, he moved to Bristol and began playing with Keith Tippett's Seedbed Orchestra. Turning professional he formed his own jazz quartet, writing and playing local gigs. In 1993, he won a touring award which took the band to London and Birmingham. In 1997, the band won a second jazz services touring award and Lottery award to produce a CD for which he wrote a new batch of tunes. Alongside these achievements he studied classical saxophone under Will Gregory and took grade 8 and then a diploma from the Guildhall School of Music and Drama.

From 1996 to 1999, he played, wrote and later managed the contemporary big band, Ultrasound, producing two CDs and playing in Queen Elizabeth Hall (London), Bracknell and Plymouth Festivals. From 1998 to 2003, he played with Brazilian music combo Sirius B, recording two CDs and touring; including The Jazz Cafe (London), Montreux Jazz Festival, and many other major European venues. In 2001, with guidance from his teacher Tim Garland, he attended the Guildhall postgraduate jazz diploma year. During the course he was asked to join Keith Tippett's big band, Tapestry, for tours of Canada and Portugal, and in 2004 a Norwich festival performance with the Apollo saxophone quartet and the BBC Singers, broadcast on BBC Radio 3. After the course in London he reformed his quartet, wrote some new material and began playing in venues around the country, including the Glastonbury Festival. He was also busy on the local Bristol scene with pianist Jim Blomfield (Septimbre and Latin Perspective) and Andy Hague (Big Band and Silverado). As well as jazz, Figes' passion's include Brazilian music, playing mainly flute with Quarteto Bossa.

Since 2007 Figes has composed and produced many well-received recordings with his own jazz quartet. Recent work includes 'Changing Times' (2020) by the Kevin Figes Quartet, which was described as 'A mind-expanding feast for the ears' and received a 4* review from Dave Gelly in The Guardian, and 'Wallpaper Music' (2021) (with the addition of Brigitte Beraha on vocals) which was described as 'A kaleidoscopic blizzard' by John Fordham in his 4* review for Jazzwise.

Other projects included 4 Sided Triangle (with Mike Outram), an Octet and the 15-piece big band ‘Resonation’. Figes has played at Ronnie Scott’s with Pee Wee Ellis and Fred Wesley, Bobby Shew and Denny Ilett’s Electric Lady Big Band, of which he is a member. He has also performed on the Park stage at Glastonbury with the music of Barry Gray and major festivals with This Is The Kit. His own quartet have performed nationally and broadcast live from Glastonbury Festival on Radio 3. In 2021, Kevin was musical director for a series of concerts celebrating the life of Keith Tippett.

Forthcoming work includes compositions for piano, use of experimental methods and found sounds, writing of lyrics in song form and exploring a range of genres including contemporary classical, jazz, free improvisation, folk and rock.

== More quotes on Figes music ==
- "One of the most interesting emerging talents on the UK jazz scene" - Jazzwise
- "It's this combination of rich writing with an outstanding band that gives Figes's solo LP such distinction" - Independent on Sunday
- "Compelling Bristol-based altoist Figes mixes up old school bop with a contemporary attack and edgy harmony" - Time Out

== Discography ==
- Kevin Figes Quartet - Circular Motion - (Edition Records, 2008)
- Kevin Figes Quartet - Hometime - (Pig Records, 2011)
- Kevin Figes, Mike Outram, Dan Moore and Daisy Palmer - 4 Sided Triangle - (Pig, 2012)
- Kevin Figes Quartet - Tables And Chairs - (Pig, 2013)
- Kevin Figes Octet - Time Being - (Pig, 2016)
- Kevin Figes Quartet - Weather Warning - (Pig, 2016)
- Kevin Figes Quartet - Changing Times - (Pig, 2020)
- Kevin Figes - Wallpaper Music - (Pig, 2021)
- Kevin Figes -The Common & Other Short Storie - (Pig, 2023)
- plus guest appearances

== News articles on Figes ==
- The Guardian - 13th June 2020
- Jazzwise - February 2022
- The Independent - 3 April 2011
- Black Mountain Jazz 2008
- New Bristol Jazz
- Time Out
- The Swanage Jazz Festival
