= Jason Figgis =

Irish film director

Jason Figgis is an Irish film director known for his work on a variety of projects ranging from documentaries to horror films. He was born in Ranelagh, Dublin, and attended St. Mary’s College in Rathmines before studying art at Ballyfermot Senior College in Dublin. After working for Murakami-Wolf Animation Studios and Steven Spielberg's Amblimation Studios, Figgis studied business and worked in communications dealer accounts management before setting up his own film production company, October Eleven Pictures.

Figgis directed his first feature film, The Twilight Hour, in collaboration with photographer Simon Marsden in 2003. The documentary feature project, narrated by John Hurt, was acquired by the Discovery Network and distributed to 100 countries in 2004. Figgis was then invited by BSkyB to join them as a director, and he directed several feature projects, including Uri's Haunted Cities: Venice and A Maverick In London.

In 2018, Figgis formed a film partnership with journalist and broadcaster John West, called Figgis-West. Their first joint production was the haunted house feature, The Ghost of Winifred Meeks, which was distributed by BayView Entertainment and Pinewood Studios High Fliers Films.

Figgis has directed several other documentary projects, including Simon Marsden: A Life in Pictures, Die Strong, Gladiator Skool, Love? and Shirley Baker: Life Through a Lens. He has designed covers and written forewords for several books, including Britain's Haunted Heritage and Britain's Ghostly Heritage, both authored by John West, as well as The Battle of Gainsborough 1643 and In Search of Roman Lincoln.

== Filmography ==
- 2003: The Twilight Hour: Visions of Ireland's Haunted Past (documentary) – director/writer
- 2005: Uri's Haunted Cities: Venice (documentary) – director/writer
- 2005: A Maverick in London – director
- 2006: A Curious Incident in the Life of Uri Geller – director/writer
- 2007: Blood – Producer/cinematographer
- 2008: Dublin: The Movie (segment "Jo Jo") – director/writer
- 2010: Once Upon a Time in Dublin (aka 3Crosses) – director/writer
- 2012: A Christmas Carol – director/Adaptation
- 2013: Children of a Darker Dawn – director/writer
- 2015: The Ecstasy of Isabel Mann – director/writer.
- 2016: Urban Traffik – director/writer.
- 2016: Don't You Recognise Me? – director/writer
- 2017: Torment – director
- 2017: Grindsploitation (segment "The Wandering") – director/writer
- 2017: The 12 Slays of Christmas (segment "The Uncommon Mr Goode") – director/writer
- 2017: Grindsploitation 3: Video Nasty (segment "All the Little Things/Vlad the Impaler") – director/writer
- 2017: Grindsploitation 4 (segment "Hacksaw Jack") – director/writer
- 2017: Trashsploitation (segment "Isabel/Don’t You") – director/writer
- 2017: Schlocksploitation (segment "Backroads/Bring Me the Head of Anto Murphy") – director/writer
- 2017: Gore Theatre (segment "Nouveau Monde/Ethan") – director/writer
- 2017: Home Movies (segment "The Almost Daily Journal of a Madman") – director/writer
- 2017: Home Movies 2 (segment "Numbers") – director/writer
- 2017: Horror Box (segment "The Last Train") – director/writer
- 2017: 1000 Zombies (segment "In The Beginning") – director/writer
- 2018: Simon Marsden: A Haunted Life in Pictures – director/writer
- 2018: Schlock-O-Rama (segment "Railway Children Promo") – director/writer
- 2018: Die In 60 Seconds 3 (segment "Bedside Manner/If You Go Down To The Woods/Run Lady Run") – director/writer
- 2018: Dark Tales (segment "Friends Forever") – director/writer
- 2018: American Sasquatch (segment "The Grey Man") – director/writer
- 2018: Grindsploitation 8: Drive-In Grindhouse (segment "Knife") – director/writer
- 2018: The Haunting of M.R. James – director
- 2019: Gore Theatre 2 (segment "The Black Widow") – director/writer
- 2019: Theatre of the Deranged III (segment "In Common") – director/writer
- 2019: Clare Island (short) – director
- 2019: Faces Of Fear (segment "The Ties That Bind") – director/writer
- 2019: Previews of Coming Attractions (film trailer) – director/writer
- 2019: Trailersploitation (film trailer) – director/writer
- 2020: The Wedding Ring (short) – director/writer
- 2020: In Our Day (short) – director/writer
- 2020: Mythmaker: George A. Romero (short) – director/writer
- 2020: Dunkirk 80 (short) – Producer/editor/writer
- 2020: The Ghost of Winifred Meeks – director/writer
- 2021: Maverick – director/writer
- 2022: Nosferatu – Co-producer of newly restored/scored version of the 1922 horror classic
- 2022: Plague of the Dead (Anthology) – director/writer
- 2022: 60 Seconds to Live (Anthology) – director/writer
- 2022: Die Strong – director
- 2022: My Island (music video for Uri Geller) – director
- 2022: Love? Docudrama on domestic abuse (written and narrated by Samantha Beckinsale) – director
- 2023: Colin Wilson: The Outsider - Part One – director
- 2023: Colin Wilson: The Outsider - Part Two – director
- 2023: Colin Wilson: The Occult - Part One – director
- 2023: Colin Wilson: The Occult - Part Two – director
- 2023: Colin Wilson: Access Inner Worlds - Part One – director
- 2023: Colin Wilson: Access Inner Worlds - Part Two – director
- 2023: Voyage to a Beginning – director
- 2023: Colin Wilson: with Gary Lachman – director
- 2023: The Athena Syndrome – director (pre-production)
- 2023: Shirley Baker: Life Through A Lens – director
- 2024: Gladiator Skool – director
- 2024: The House at the End of the Lane - director/writer
- 2025: Nostradamus (music promo for Justin Hayward and Uri Geller) - director
- 2025: Thank You (music promo for Skyler Jett and Elliott Randall) - director
- 2025: Code Red: Spain - director/writer
- 2025: Jane Finds the Sea Frightening - director/writer
- 2025: Soren – director/writer
