= October Eleven Pictures =

Irish film production company

October Eleven Pictures is an Irish production company based in Dublin, Ireland. It is a company dedicated to the development and encouragement of new and existing talent in the arenas of film, design and music.

== Filmography ==
2003. The Twilight Hour: Visions of Ireland's Haunted Past (Documentary) - Director/writer.

2005. Uri's Haunted Cities: Venice (documentary) - Director/writer.

2006. A Maverick in London: The Story of the King's Head Theatre (documentary) - Director/writer.

2006. A Curious Incident in the Life of Uri Geller - Director/writer.

2007. Blood - Producer/cinematographer.

2008. Dublin: The Movie (segment “Jo Jo”) - Director/writer.

2010. Once Upon a Time in Dublin (aka 3Crosses) - Director/writer.

2012. A Christmas Carol - Director/Adaptation.

2013. Children of a Darker Dawn - Director/writer.

2015. The Ecstasy of Isabel Mann - Director/writer.

2016. Urban Traffik - Director/writer.

2016. Don't You Recognise Me? - Director/writer.

2017. Torment - Director.

2017. Grindsploitation (segment "The Wandering") - Director/writer.

2017. The 12 Slays of Christmas (segment “The Uncommon Mr Goode”) - Director/writer.

2017. Grindsploitation 3: Video Nasty (segment "All the Little Things/Vlad the Impaler") - Director/writer.

2017. Grindsploitation 4 (segment “Hacksaw Jack”) - Director/writer.

2017. Trashsploitation (segment “Isabel/Don’t You”) - Director/writer.

2017. Schlocksploitation (segment "Backroads/Bring Me the Head of Anto Murphy”) - Director/writer.

2017. Gore Theatre (segment “Nouveau Monde/Ethan”) - Director/writer.

2017. Home Movies (segment “The Almost Daily Journal of a Madman”) - Director/writer.

2017. Home Movies 2 (segment “Numbers”) - Director/writer.

2017. Horror Box (segment “The Last Train”) - Director/writer.

2017. 1000 Zombies (segment “In The Beginning”) - Director/writer.

2018. Simon Marsden: A Life in Pictures - Director/writer.

2018. Schlock-O-Rama (segment “Railway Children Promo") - Director/writer.

2018. Die In 60 Seconds 3 (segment “Bedside Manner/If You Go Down To The Woods/Run Lady Run”) - Director/writer.

2018. Dark Tales (segment “Friends Forever”) - Director/writer.

2018. American Sasquatch (segment "The Grey Man") - Director/writer.

2018. Grindsploitation 8: Drive-In Grindhouse (segment “Knife”) - Director/writer.

2018. The Haunting of M.R. James - Director.

2019. Gore Theatre 2 (segment “The Black Widow”) - Director/writer.

2019. Theatre of the Deranged III (segment "In Common") - Director/writer.

2019. Clare Island (short) - Director.

2019. Faces Of Fear (segment “The Ties That Bind”) - Director/writer.

2019. Midnight In The Mortuary (segment “What The Worst Thing Is”) - Director/writer.

2019. Previews of Coming Attractions (film trailer) - Director/writer.

2019. Trailersploitation (film trailer) - Director/writer.

2020. The Wedding Ring (short) - Director/writer.

2020. In Our Day (short) - Director/writer.

2020. Mythmaker: George A. Romero (short) - Director/writer.

2020. Dunkirk 80 (short) - Editor/writer.

2020. Winifred Meeks - Director/writer.

2021. Cold Sun - Director (pre-production).
