= Laura Jurd =

British jazz trumpeter

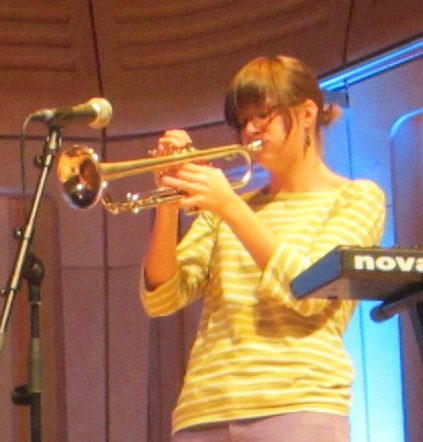

Background information
- Born: 1990 or 1991 (age 35–36); Medstead, Hampshire, UK
- Genre: Jazz
- Occupations: Musician, composer, bandleader, producer, conservatoire lecturer
- Instruments: Trumpet, synthesizer
- Labels: Edition, Discus Music, Spartacus Records, Chaos Collective, New Soil
- Website: laurajurd.com

Laura Jurd (born 1990 or 1991) is a British musician, composer and producer. She plays trumpet and synthesizer. She has released albums as a solo artist, and she composes for and plays in a jazz quartet named Dinosaur, whose album Together, As One was nominated for the Mercury Prize in 2017.

Jurd teaches composition at Trinity Laban Conservatoire of Music and Dance in London.

== Early years and education ==
Jurd grew up in Medstead, Hampshire. She attended the Trinity Laban Conservatoire of Music and Dance.

== Awards and honours ==
Jurd is a member of BBC Radio 3's New Generation Artists. She won in category Instrumentalist of the Year in the 2015 Parliamentary Jazz Awards, the Worshipful Company of Musicians' Dankworth Prize for Jazz Composition in 2011 and the Young Jazz Musician award in 2012. She was shortlisted for a BASCA Contemporary Jazz Composer award in 2012.

== Discography ==
- Landing Ground (2012)
- Human Spirit (2015)
- Together, As One with Dinosaur (2016)
- Wonder Trail with Dinosaur (2018)
- Stepping Back, Jumping In (2019)
- To The Earth with Dinosaur (2020)
- The Big Friendly Album (2022)
- Rites & Revelations (New Soil, 2025)
