= Jonny Phillips (musician) =

English jazz guitarist and composer

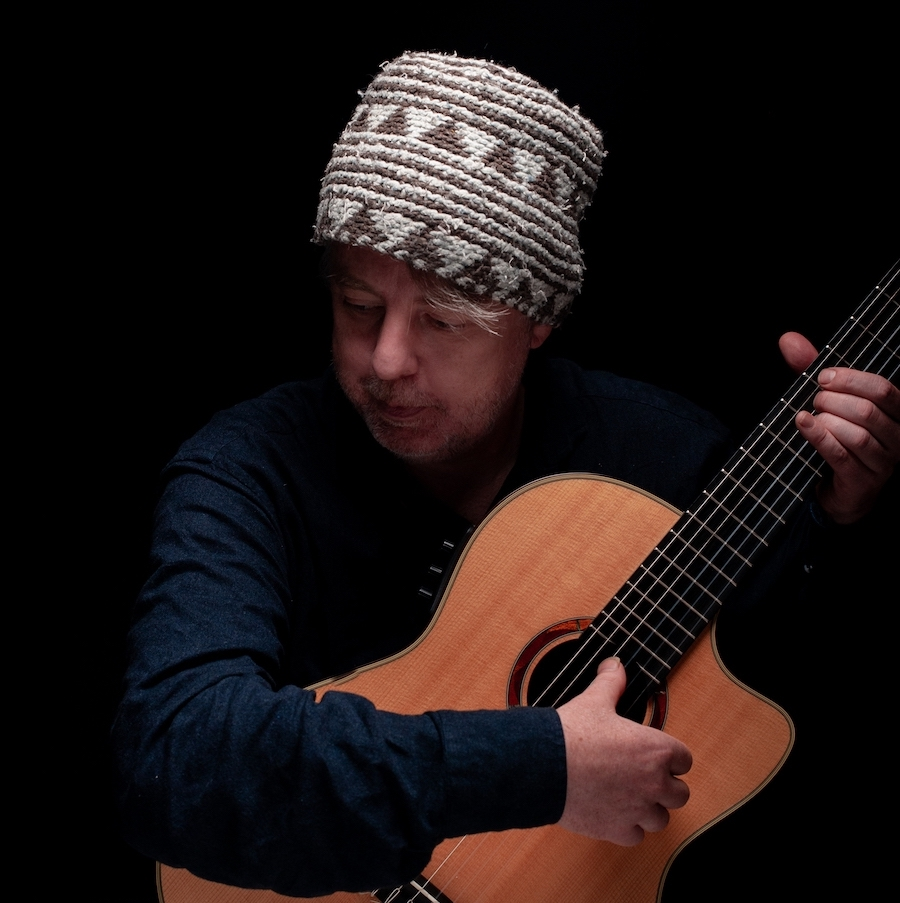

Background information
- Born: 11 January 1971 (age 55); Kendal, Westmorland, England
- Origin: London
- Genres: Jazz
- Occupations: Musician, composer
- Instrument: Guitar
- Labels: F-IRE Collective; Babel Label
- Member of: Oriole

Jonny Phillips (born 11 January 1971, in Kendal, Westmorland, England) is an English jazz guitarist and composer. He played the violin and studied theory from the age of five, however he swapped to guitar at fifteen to study jazz, Brazilian and African music. After his studies at Newcastle College of Music, Phillips moved to London where he set up his group Oriole, with whom he has released three albums on the F-IRE Collective label. Oriole is perhaps one of the few groups to feature two Mercury nominated artists: Ben Davis on cello and Seb Rochford on drums. Phillips is now based in South London after three and a half years living in Andalusia, Spain.

== Oriole ==
=== Albums ===
- Song for the Sleeping (F-IRE Collective, 2005)
- Migration (F-IRE Collective, 2006)
- Every New Day (F-IRE Collective, 2011)

=== Lineup ===
- Jonny Phillips – guitar
- Ingrid Laubrock – tenor Saxophone
- Ben Davis – cello
- Idris Rahman – tenor saxophone
- Nick Ramm – piano
- Adriano Adewale – percussion
- Ruth Goller – bass
- Fernando De Marco – bass
- Seb Rochford – drums

The music of Oriole has on occasion been associated with magical realist literature.

== Associated bands ==
Phillips has also played and recorded with:

- Soothsayers
- Julia Biel
- F-ire Large Ensemble
- Seb Rochford's Polar Bear
- Renato D'Aiello

Discography

- The Perrier Award Winners -JazzFm compilation (Jazz-Fm, 2000)
- Song for the Sleeping – Oriole (F-IRE Collective, 2005)
- Migration – Oriole (F-IRE Collective, 2006)
- Not Alone – Julia Biel (Rokit, 2006)
- Held on the Tips of Fingers – Polar Bear (Babel Label, 2006)
- F-ire Works Vol. 1 (F-IRE Collective, 2006)
- Tangled Roots – Red Earth, 2006
- F-ire Works Vol. 2 (F-IRE Collective, 2007)
- ZOOM! European Jazz Collective (Yolk, 2007)

== Reviews ==
- Timeout
- The Guardian
- The Guardian – live review
- Ronnie Scott's Magazine
- Straight No Chaser
- Cheltenham Jazz Festival Review
- The Guardian
- Echoes, Kevin Le Gendre
- The Independent
- Jazzwise
- The Herald
- Straight No Chaser 2
