= F-IRE Collective =

Creative music community in London

F-IRE Collective is a creative music community founded by Barak Schmool. It has been described as the UK's leading and perhaps most influential modern jazz group. The Collective also has a record label.

In 2004, F-IRE Collective won the BBC Jazz Award for Innovation.

== Details ==
F-IRE (Fellowship for Integrated Rhythmic Expression) was named later in 1998 and came to encompass a community of artists whose outlook stretched beyond 'music alone'. Dance, poetry, film and other modes of creative expression were as much a part of their artistic conception as the sound they produced. F-IRE members attempt to cultivate their own directions and transcend categorical boundaries, circus or electronica, free improvisation or classical composition.

F-IRE has three main communal objectives: to sustain the creative lives of their members and the surrounding community; to ensure that their creativity functions well inside the wider community; to share their knowledge and opportunities. The collective's success is built on the quality of its work in education, performance and recording. Until 2005 these three principal spheres of activity proceeded without funding.

One of the members, Jonathan Bratoëff, is a Berlin-based guitarist. He has also played with musicians like Julian Siegel, Soweto Kinch, and Orphy Robinson.

== Active members ==
- Barak Schmool
- Ben Davis
- Ingrid Laubrock
- Jonny Phillips
- Jonathan Bratoeff
- Maurizio Ravalico
- Nick Ramm
- Dave O'Brien
- Kit Downes
- Tom Mason
- Richard Turner
- Fred Thomas
- Lucy Railton
- Zac Gvi

== Former members ==
- Finn Peters
- Seb Rochford
- Pete Wareham
- Julia Biel
- Robert Mitchell
- Justin Quinn
- Leo Taylor
- Dave Okumu
- Tom Arthurs

== Bands ==
- Acoustic Ladyland
- Bakehouse
- Basquiat Strings
- Clown Revisited
- Ezzthetic
- Finn Peters Quintet
- Fulborn Teversham
- Grupo Sambando
- Ingrid Laubrock Quintet
- Jon Bratoëff Quartet/Quintet
- Julia Biel
- M. Ravalico / O. Marshall duo
- M. Ravalico / I. Khroustaliov duo
- Méta Méta
- Mehdi Nabti Pulsar4
- Oriole
- Panacea
- Polar Bear
- Porpoise Corpus
- Rhythms of the City
- Shorter Stories
- Synergy
- The Invisible
- The Teak Project
- Timeline
- Tom Arthurs Projects
- União da Mocidade

== See also ==
- Lists of record labels
