= The Spatial AKA Orchestra =

- Genres: Jazz; ska; swing; Dixieland
- Years active: 2006–present
- Past members: Alcyona Mick; Anthony Joseph; Crispin Robinson; Denys Baptiste; Finn Peters; Francine Luce; Harry Brown; Jason Yarde; Jerry Dammers; Nathaniel Facey; Ollie Bayley; Patrick Hatchett; Patrick Illingworth; Reuben Fox; Robin Hopcraft; Roger Beaujolais; Shabaka Hutchings; Terry Edwards
- Website: www.jerrydammers.com

The Spatial AKA Orchestra is a music ensemble led by Jerry Dammers of the Specials, an English 2 tone ska band popular in the late 1970s (which also went by the name the Special AKA). Dammers formed the orchestra in 2006 as a tribute to American jazz musician Sun Ra, though it grew to include other genres such as reggae, funk, and classical music.

The shows are as much about theater as music. At a festival in Norwich, England, Dammers donned a golden mask behind a row of keyboards on a stage cluttered with Egyptian mannequins, astronauts, and spaceships. The rest of the band emerged disguised as aliens and superheroes. Over 20 band members populated the stage during the night including Denys Baptiste, Larry Bartley, Roger Beaujolais, and Finn Peters. A similar show took place at the Barbican in London. The band played cover versions of Sun Ra's songs before covering the Specials, other work by Dammers, and ska music. Performers included poet Anthony Joseph, former Specials vocalist Francine Luce, Jamaican singer Cornell Campbell, and trombonist Rico Rodriguez.

== Personnel ==
- Alcyona Mick – piano
- Anthony Joseph – vocals
- Crispin Spry Robinson – percussion
- Denys Baptiste – tenor sax
- Finn Peters – flute
- Francine Luce – vocals
- Harry Brown – trombone
- Rico Rodriguez - trombone, vocals
- Jason Yarde – soprano sax
- Jerry Dammers – keyboards
- Nathaniel Facey – alto sax
- Ollie Bayley – bass
- Patrick Hatchett – guitar
- Patrick Illingworth – drums
- Reuben Fox – tenor sax /flute
- Robin Hopcraft – trumpet
- Roger Beaujolais – vibes
- Shabaka Hutchings – bass clarinet
- Terry Edwards – baritone sax
- Larry Stabbins – saxophones
- Zoe Rahman – piano
- Neil Charles – double bass
- Mat Fox – baritone saxophone
- Guy R Clark – guitar
- Steve Gibson – classical percussion, vibes
