= Soothsayers (band) =

English Afrobeat band

- Also known as: The Red Earth Collective
- Origin: United Kingdom
- Genres: Reggae, Dub, Afrobeat, Funk, Jazz
- Years active: 1998–present
- Labels: Wah Wah 45s, Red Earth Records
- Members: Robin Hopcraft; Idris Rahman; Emmanuel Afram; Julia Biel; Saleem Raman; Kishon Khan; Andrew Gibson
- Website: Official website

Soothsayers is a London-based band who perform and record original Afrobeat and reggae-influenced music. Formed in 1998 by saxophonist, Idris Rahman, and trumpeter, Robin Hopcraft, they have released ten studio albums and a number of vinyl singles on their own label Red Earth Records as well as WahWah45s.

== Band history ==
The Soothsayers' first album, Lost City, was released in 2000. The band spent their formative years performing in South London venues and developing a compositional style influenced mainly by the music of South African township musicians such as Abdullah Ibrahim and Hugh Masekela, and instrumental reggae artists such as Tommy McCook and the Skatalites. The album includes the song "Follow Your Path", which features Nigerian singer/musician Adesose Wallace and shows how the band developed their own version of Afrobeat, which would become an important feature of their later work. Lost City also features South African guitarist Lucky Ranku, as well as many London-based musicians who became part of the Soothsayers collective.

Their second album, Tangled Roots, was released in 2005 and was more Afrobeat inspired. It featured collaborations with Keziah Jones, Adesose Wallace, Maxi Jazz and Netsayi Chigwendere. Rahman and Hopcraft wrote, produced and mixed this album. It was a more studio-produced album than Lost City and represented a step forward in the pair's quest to combine elements of Afrobeat groove and melody with dub production and sound. Soothsayers released the track "Blinded Souls" from this album as a ten-inch vinyl single, with remixes by Quantic and Mad Professor.

The third studio album One More Reason, was released in 2009 (under the name Soothsayers and the Red Earth Collective). It featured a collection of reggae veterans such as Johnny Clarke, Michael Prophet and Linval Thompson. This album was the first to be mixed by London reggae producer and DJ Manasseh. It was also the first album to feature the harmonic vocal style that has since become an important feature of the band's sound.

Their fourth album, Red Earth Dub, was released in 2010. It was a collection of dubs and remixes by Manasseh, which also included two new compositions created in collaboration with Manasseh.

Their fifth album, Human Nature, was released in 2012. At the time of its creation, Soothsayers had fully developed their own three-part harmony vocal style (featuring the voices of Rahman, Hopcraft and younger band member Julia Biel) which had become an integral part of the sound of the music. The music, while still fundamentally inspired by dub, reggae and Afrobeat, now had a unique compositional and production style, bringing together the various strands of bass-heavy, groove-inspired music that had characterized their work over the previous decade. Human Nature has been played by DJs on BBC Radio 2, Radio 3, Radio 4, BBC 6 Music and numerous radio stations worldwide. It was featured on Gilles Peterson's 'Best of 2012' show.

Soothsayers signed to London-based label Wah Wah 45s in 2017. The label had released two EPs in 2017, Speak to my Soul and Speak to my Soul Remixed (released in July and September 2017 respectively).

Their sixth album, Tradition, was released in 2018. Tradition marked the first album to be recorded by the Soothsayers after their signing to Wah Wah 45s in 2017. Tradition Remixed was released the following year and contained remixes by, amongst others, Wu-Lu, Sarathy Korwar, Steve Cobby, Manasseh and Ben Hauke.

We Are Many, was released in 2020, featuring Victor Rice on bass plus musicians from São Paulo, where initial sessions for the album were recorded. The collaboration with Victor and other Brazilian musicians continued during lockdowns via zoom and produced the double album Soothsayers meets Victor Rice and Friends

Fly Higher is a new album due out in September 2025

== Touring ==
Throughout their career, the band has predominantly performed in the UK and Europe, playing at major jazz, reggae and world music festivals Rototom Sunsplash, the North Sea Jazz Festival and Glastonbury Festival. Soothsayers have also performed and toured extensively with Johnny Clarke, Michael Prophet and Cornel Campbell, performing some of their classics as well as new collaborative material.

== Collaborations ==
Hopcraft and Rahman have also collaborated with many other musicians, including Osibisa, Mad Professor, Rico Rodriguez, Jerry Dammers, Ayub Ogada, Aswad, Julia Biel, Zoe Rahman and Arun Ghosh. in 2011, they were asked by members of the band Antibalas to participate in the London production of the musical 'Fela!', about the life of Afrobeat creator Fela Kuti, which ran for four months at London's National Theatre. Hopcraft was the musical director and trumpeter and Rahman played the saxophone part mimed to by the actor in the title role.

== Lineup ==
- Robin Hopcraft (trumpet, vocals, production)
- Idris Rahman (sax, vocals, production)
- Emmanuel Afram (bass)
- Saleem Raman (drums)
- Julia Biel (vocals)
- Andrew Gibson (guitar)
- Kishon Khan (keyboard)

== Discography ==
=== Albums ===
- Lost City (2000, Red Earth Records)
- Tangled Roots (2004, Red Earth Records)
- One More Reason (2009, Red Earth Records)
- Red Earth Dub (2010, Red Earth Records)
- Human Nature (2012, Red Earth Records)
- Tradition (2018, Wah Wah 45s)
- We Are Many, (2020, Wah Wah 45s)
- Soothsayers Meets Victor Rice and Friends (2022, Red Earth Music)
- Fly Higher, (2025, Wah Wah 45s)

=== EPs and singles ===
- "Blinded Souls" 10", featuring remixes by Quantic and Mad Professor (2005, Red Earth Records)
- "Bad Boys" 7', featuring Johnny Clarke (2009, Red Earth Records)
- "Love Fire" 7", featuring Michael Prophet (2009, Red Earth Records)
- "I'll Never Leave / I'm Leaving" 7", featuring Cornel Campbell and Lutan Fyah (2011, Red Earth Records)
- "We're Not Leaving" 7" (2012, Red Earth Records)
- "We're Not Leaving" 12" (2012, Red Earth Records)
- "Goodnight Rico" 7" (2016, Red Earth Records)
- "Nothing Can Stop Us / Take Me High" 7" (2016, Red Earth Records)
- "Speak To My Soul" 10" (2017, Wah Wah 45s)
- "Speak To My Soul Remixed" 12" (2017, Wah Wah 45s)
- "Dis & Dat" 12" (2018, Wah Wah 45s)
- "Sleepwalking (Black Man's Cry) / Natural Mystic" 7" (2018, Wah Wah 45s)
- "Watching The Stars" (2018, Wah Wah 45s)

=== Compilations featured ===
- Vibrations from the Motherland ("Crocodiles" featuring Busi Mholongo, 2008, Melt 2000)
