= Where Rivers Meet =

Studio album by Zoe Rahman
- Released: 22 September 2008
- Genre: Jazz
- Length: 52:32
- Languages: English; Bengali
- Label: Manushi

Zoe Rahman chronology
Melting Pot (2006)	Where Rivers Meet (2008)	Zoe Rahman Trio: Live (2009)

Idris Rahman chronology
Where Rivers Meet (2008)

Where Rivers Meet is a studio album by English musicians Zoe and Idris Rahman, released on 22 September 2008 by Manushi Records.

== Background ==
Zoe and Idris Rahman discovered Bengali music in 2002, when their father, Mizan Rahman, was hospitalised and Zoe played 1950s Bengali music for him while he recovered. Zoe became intrigued by the sounds and subsequent trips to Bangladesh allowed her to learn about her background through music.

In April 2010, Zoe told Manchester Evening News, "We [Zoe and Idris Rahman] wanted to learn about our family heritage by delving into this rich musical source and hope that in the process the songs will be seen in a new light by those who already know them. Perhaps they will take others on a journey of discovery similar to the one we have experienced through making this album."

Idris added: "This album represents a very personal journey that Zoe and I have taken into our own culture through music directly taught or recommended by our father, cousins and other close friends and musicians."

== Composition ==
Songs make up about a third of Where Rivers Meet, with the remaining two thirds instrumental. The tunes include three by Bengali Nobel Laureate Rabindranath Tagore — "Invitation Missed", "Stream Of Joy" and "Do You Wish To Forget?" The songs were also inspired by Abbasudddin and Hementa Kumar Mukerjee amongst others.

== Critical response ==
Professional ratings
Review scores
Source	Rating
The Guardian	3/5 stars
All About Jazz	4.5/5 stars
The List	3/5 stars
Metro	4/5 stars

John Fordham of The Guardian rated Where Rivers Meet 3/5 and called the album "...a distinctive, heartfelt and unusual world music venture." John Lusk of BBC Music said "It's a slow grower, and a modest rather towering achievement, but give its gentle charms a chance and you may find yourself liking it a whole lot more than you'd expected."

Chris May of All About Jazz rated the album 4.5/5 and said, "It's best described as chamber jazz hybridized with Bengali popular music, and is a vibrant affair packed with melodies—some joyful, others sad, all of them intensely pretty—and gorgeously lyrical improvisations." Ian Mann of The Jazz Mann described it as "A thoroughly enjoyable musical journey. One of the most distinctive releases of the year."

Kenny Mathieson of The List rated 3/5 and said, "The beguiling melodies and richly coloured harmonies combine to form a fascinating, lightly textured hybrid that is part chamber jazz and part Bengali folk-pop music... A distinctly different and always absorbing take on the world jazz phenomenon. Metro rated the album 4/5 and said "...Zoe's [Rahman's] distinctive piano sounds more comfortable and freewheeling than ever before, rumbling away around the chord changes and providing wonderful texture throughout."

== Track listing ==
No.	Title	Length
1.	"O Nodi Re" (O, River)	4:02
2.	"Tumi Amay Dekechhile Chhutir Nimontrone" (Invitation Missed)	5:49
3.	"Briddho Ashrom" (Sanctuary)	4:49
4.	"Amar Har Kala Korlam Re" (Betrayed)	6:23
5.	"Tumi Ele Onek Diner Pore" (You Came Like Welcome Rain)	4:27
6.	"Amay Bhashaili Re" (Now You're Gone)	2:48
7.	"Pother Klanti Bhule" (Pilgrim's Song)	4:11
8.	"Koto Din Dekhini Tomai" (Mind's Eye)	4:14
9.	"Anondo Dhara" (Stream of Joy)	5:20
10.	"Abar Elo Je Sondhya" (Suddenly It's Dusk Again)	5:30
11.	"Abar Hobe to Dekha" (We'll Surely Meet Again)	4:29
12.	"Purano Sei" (Do You Wish to Forget?)	3:08
Total length:		52:32

== Personnel ==
Musicians

- Zoe Rahman – piano
- Idris Rahman – clarinet
- Kuljit Bhamra – tabla
- Gene Calderazzo – drums
- Oli Hayhurst – bass
- Samy Bishai – violin

Vocals

- Arnob
- Gaurob
- Joseph Aquilina
- Mizan Rahman
