= Goat head =

Goat head, Goat Head, or Goathead may refer to:

- Goat's head, a common name for several plants
- Sigil of Baphomet, a sigil of the material world
- Harry Buckner (1876–1938), nicknamed "Goat Head", American baseball player
- "Goat Head", a song by Brittany Howard from the 2019 album Jaime
- Goat Head, a fictional character in the film Bleat!
- Goathead, a nickname for the logo on the alternate jersey worn by the Buffalo Sabres
- "Goathead", a song by Goat from the 2012 album World Music
- New Mexico Goatheads, an American ice hockey team

== See also ==
- Goats Head Soup, a 1973 album by the Rolling Stones
