= M. gracile =

M. gracile may refer to:

- Melampodium gracile, a flowering plant species
- Moeritherium gracile, a prehistoric mammal species that lived during the Eocene epoch
