= Sooth =

Sooth may refer to:

- Sooth, an archaic English-language synonym of Truth
- Sooth (chutney), a type of sweet chutney made with dried ginger

== See also ==
- Soothsayer
