= Oriole (band) =

British world music/jass crossover band

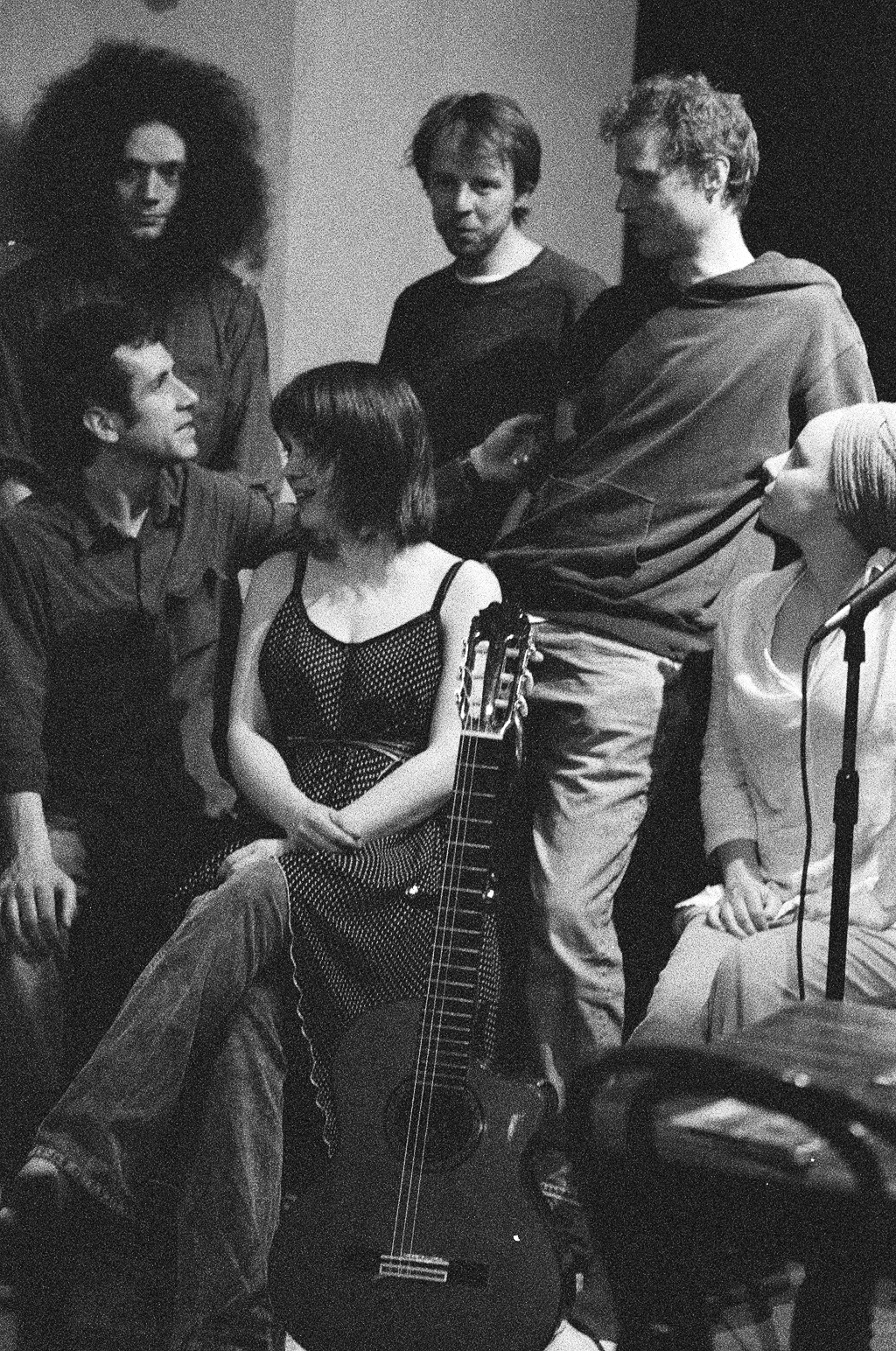
Oriole

Oriole are a London-based band fusing lyrical world music with jazz spontaneity, who create an aural form of Magical Realism. Oriole's members consist of many of the most well established figures in the new British Jazz scene and are perhaps one of the few groups to feature two Mercury nominated artists: Ben Davis on cello and Seb Rochford on drums. They have also released two albums on the F-IRE Collective label. The music of Oriole is composed by prolific guitarist Jonny Phillips (musician).

== Discography ==
- Song for the Sleeping (F-ire, 2005)
- Migration (F-ire, 2006)
- Every New Day (F-ire, 2012)

=== Compilation albums ===
- F-ire Works Vol. 1 (F-ire, 2006)
- F-ire Works Vol. 2 (F-ire, 2007)
- ZOOM! European Jazz Collective (F-ire, 2007)

== Personnel ==
- Jonny Phillips - guitar
- Ingrid Laubrock - tenor saxophone
- Ben Davis - cello
- Idris Rahman - tenor saxophone
- Nick Ramm - piano
- Adriano Adewale - percussion
- Ruth Goller - bass
- Fernando De Marco - bass
- Seb Rochford - drums
- Guests and previous members have included Sarah Homer, Julia Biel, Okou, Steve Buckley, Guillermo Rozenthuler, Paul Clarvis and Anders Christensen.
