= Zoe Rahman Trio: Live =

Live album by Zoe Rahman
- Released: 11 May 2009
- Recorded: April 2007 at PizzaExpress Jazz Club in London
- Genre: Jazz
- Length: 51:49
- Label: Manushi Records

Zoe Rahman chronology
| Where Rivers Meet (2008) | Zoe Rahman Trio: Live (2009) | Kindred Spirits (2012) |

Zoe Rahman Trio: Live (also known as Live with special guest Idris Rahman) is the fourth studio album by English jazz composer Zoe Rahman, released on 11 May 2009 by Manushi Records.

== Background ==
Live was recorded at London's PizzaExpress Jazz Club in April 2007, a month before the sessions for the album Where Rivers Meet. The album includes two tracks subsequently recorded for Where Rivers Meet.

== Critical response ==
Professional ratings
Review scores
| Source | Rating |
|---|---|
| All About Jazz | 4/5 stars |
| The Guardian | 4/5 stars |
| The Scotsman | 3 stars |

John Fordham of The Guardian rated Live 4/5 and said, "...The folksier episodes echo Gilad Atzmon's brand of eastern-influenced world music, and the eager confidence and fluency of the way Rahman's solos break out of the themes confirm her ascent to an impressive new level."

Chris May of All About Jazz rated the album 4/5 and said, "Hard swinging and outgoing, Live is an infectious goodtime album and provides a valuable record of where the Zoe Rahman Trio was at in early 2007..." The Scotsman rated it 3 stars and said of the album, "Sound is good if a little recessed in places, but the energy and imagination carry the day."

== Track listing ==
| No. | Title | Length |
|---|---|---|
| 1. | "The Stride" | 6:34 |
| 2. | "Ha Gente Aqui" (featuring Idris Rahman) | 7:18 |
| 3. | "Friday 13th" | 5:53 |
| 4. | "Tuang Guru" | 8:02 |
| 5. | "Muchhe Jaoa Dinguli" (featuring Idris Rahman) | 4:05 |
| 6. | "Harlem Blues" | 5:48 |
| 7. | "Egyptian Dune Dance" | 5:15 |
| 8. | "Last Note" | 8:54 |
| Total length: | | 51:49 |

== Personnel ==
Musicians

- Zoe Rahman – piano
- Gene Calderazzo – drums
- Oli Hayhurst – bass
- Idris Rahman – clarinet
