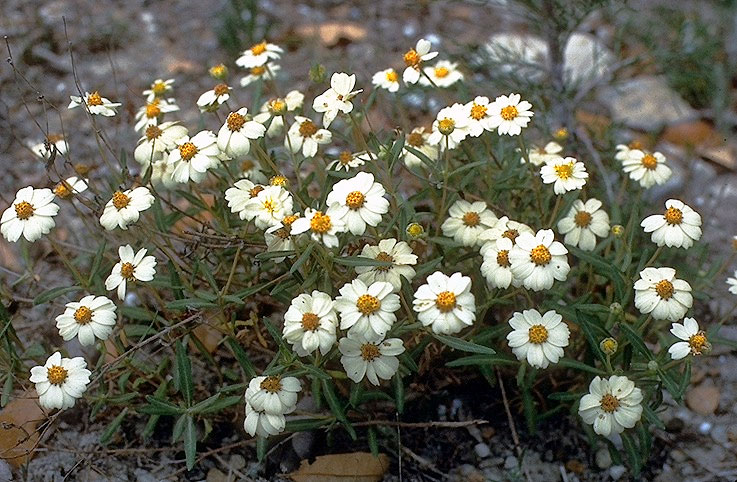
- Melampodium leucanthum

Scientific classification
- Kingdom: Plantae
- Clade: Tracheophytes
- Clade: Angiosperms
- Clade: Eudicots
- Clade: Asterids
- Order: Asterales
- Family: Asteraceae
- Subfamily: Asteroideae
- Tribe: Millerieae
- Subtribe: Melampodiinae
- Genus: Melampodium; L.

Type species
- Melampodium americanum L.

Synonyms
- Camutia bonat. ex Steud.; Melampodium sect. Alcina DC.; Pronacron Cass.; Zarabellia Cass.; Dysodium Rich. ex Pers.; Carnutia Baker; Alcina Cav.; Dysodium Rich.; Cargila Raf.

= Melampodium =

Genus of flowering plants

Melampodium is a genus of flowering plants in the sunflower family.

These are rugged plants native to the tropical to subtropical regions that include Central America, Southwestern United States, California, Florida, the Caribbean, and South America. Most of the species can be found in Mexico, five in the Southwestern United States, and three are scattered in Colombia and Brazil.

Some sources say that the name Melampodium is derived from the Greek words μέλας (melas), meaning "black", and πόδιον (podion), meaning "foot". This refers to the color of the base of the stem and roots. Members of the genus are commonly known as blackfoots. Other authorities, however, maintain that this is in error, that the name comes from Melampus, a soothsayer of renown in Greek mythology.

The genus consists of annuals and perennials or bushy plants, growing to a height of 1 m. When fully grown, they tend to fall over. They like average, well-drained soil, but can equally grow on rocky soil in deserts. They are moderately to highly drought- and heat-tolerant. Three species of the so-called white-rayed complex are xerophytic.

The foliage varies from bright green to grey-green. The opposite leaves are narrow and about 2–5 cm long.

The terminal flower heads are about 2.5 cm wide. They give a continuous display of white (only in the three species of the white-rayed complex), cream, or yellow daisylike ray florets, surrounding a darker orange center with the disc florets. These eight to 10 broad disc florets are functionally staminate. The five outer bracts are partially joined for about half their length.

The numerous fruits are seed-like (they consist of inner involucral bracts each enclosing and fused with individual ray achenes), with a few narrow scales at their tip. They make this genus one of the most prolific of the summer annuals, with seedlings coming up constantly.

The genus displays a large number of haploid chromosome numbers are based on 4 basic chromosome numbers (x = 9, 10, 11, 12).

Several cultivars of Melampodium leucanthum have been developed, such as 'Million Gold' and 'Showstar', mostly to achieve a more compact size.

Note: Melampodium has been labelled Sanvitalia speciosa in the horticultural trade, but this is an invalid name.

== Species ==
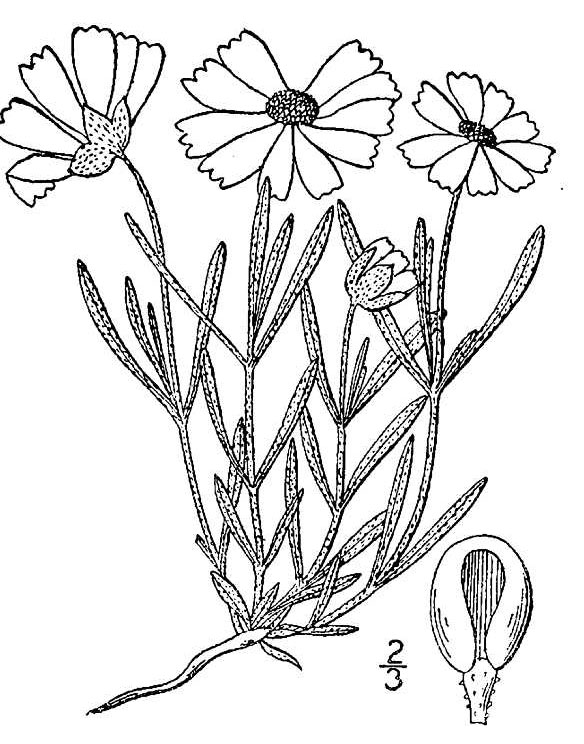
Plains blackfoot (Melampodium leucanthum) (1913 illustration from Britton, N.L., and A. Brown. Illustrated flora of the northern states and Canada. Vol. 3: 459.

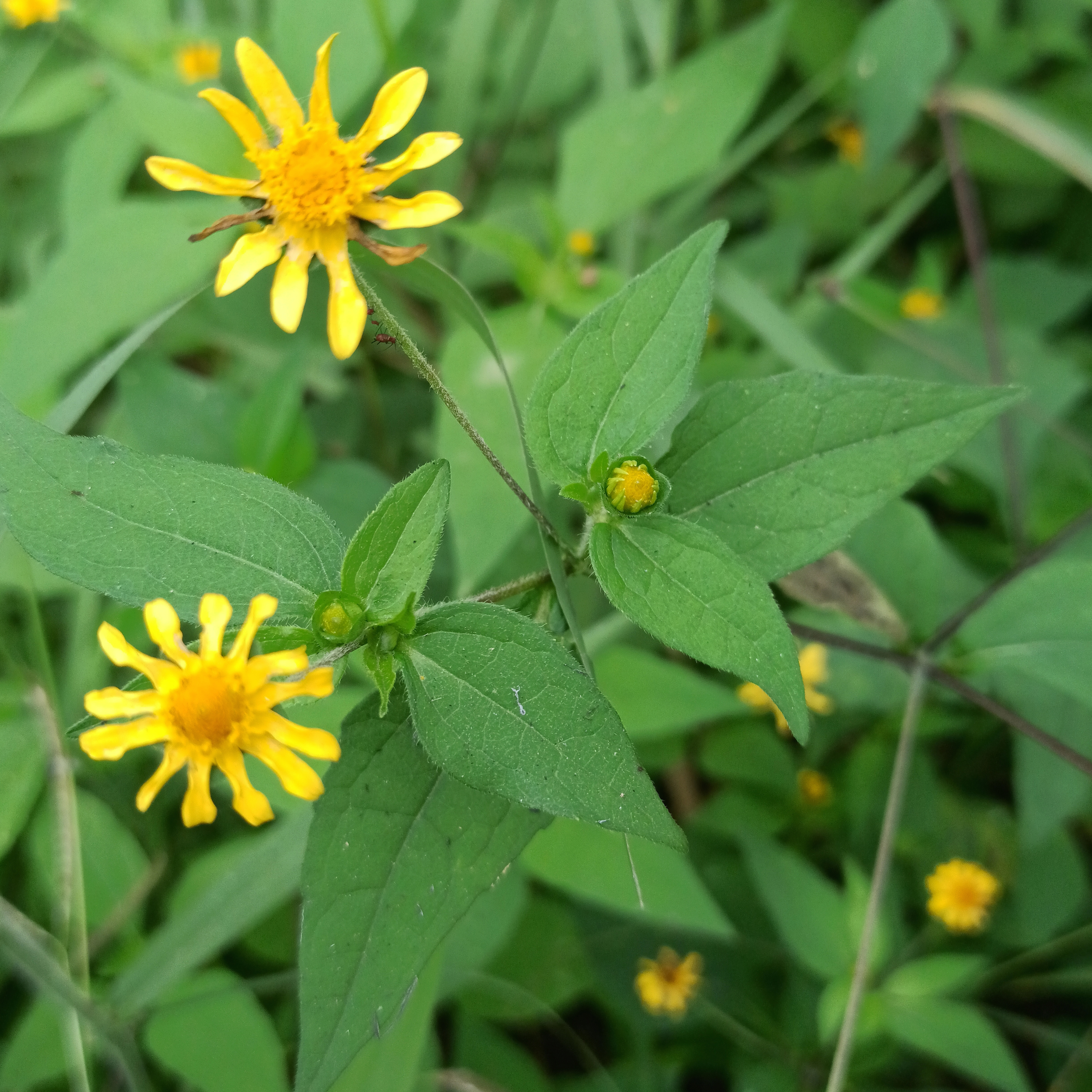
Flowers and buds of Melampodium divaricatum.

Species

- Melampodium americanum - Guatemala, El Salvador, Mexico (from Tamaulipas to Chiapas)
- Melampodium appendiculatum - Chihuahua, Sonora, Nayarit, Arizona
- Melampodium argophyllum - Coahuila, Nuevo León
- Melampodium aureum - Puebla, Oaxaca
- Melampodium bibractatum - Durango, State of Mexico, Guatemala
- Melampodium cinereum - Coahuila, Nuevo León, Texas, Missouri
- Melampodium costaricense - Costa Rica, Panama, Belize, Nicaragua, Colombia
- Melampodium cupulatum - Sonora, Sinaloa, Jalisco, Baja California Sur
- Melampodium diffusum - Oaxaca, Philippines (probably introduced)
- Melampodium divaricatum - Brazil, Bolivia, West Indies, Venezuela, Colombia, Central America, Mexico, United States (FL AL LA AR)
- Melampodium glabribracteatum - Oaxaca
- Melampodium glabrum - Guanajuato, Jalisco, Michoacán
- Melampodium gracile - Guatemala, El Salvador, Belize, Mexico (from Tamaulipas to Chiapas)
- Melampodium leucanthum - Chihuahua, USA (TX NM AZ OK KS CO)
- Melampodium linearilobum - Mexico, Central America
- Melampodium longicorne - Sonora, Arizona, New Mexico
- Melampodium longifolium - Mexico
- Melampodium longipes - Jalisco
- Melampodium longipilum - from Guatemala to San Luis Potosí
- Melampodium mayfieldii - Jalisco
- Melampodium microcephalum - from Guatemala to Jalisco
- Melampodium mimulifolium - Oaxaca
- Melampodium montanum - from Guatemala to Jalisco + San Luis Potosí
- Melampodium nayaritense - Durango, Nayarit
- Melampodium northingtonii - Oaxaca
- Melampodium nutans - Oaxaca, Jalisco, Colima, Michoacán
- Melampodium paniculatum - from Oaxaca to Brazil
- Melampodium percussum
- Melampodium perfoliatum - Mexico, Central America, Cuba, California
- Melampodium pilosum - Guerrero, Michoacan
- Melampodium pringlei - Oaxaca, Puebla
- Melampodium repens - Veracruz
- Melampodium rosei - Sinaloa, Jalisco, Nayarit
- Melampodium sericeum - Mexico, Guatemala, El Salvador
- Melampodium sinaloense - Sinaloa
- Melampodium sinuatum - Baja California Sur
- Melampodium strigosum - Chihuahua, Durango, D.F., Mexico State, Hidalgo, United States (AZ NM TX CO)
- Melampodium tenellum - Nayarit
- Melampodium tepicense - Nayarit, Jalisco

=== Formerly placed here ===
- Acanthospermum australe (Loefl.) Kuntze (as M. australe Loefl.)
- Acanthospermum humile (Sw.) DC. (as M. humile Sw.)
- Eleutheranthera ruderalis (Sw.) Sch.Bip. (as M. ruderale Sw.)
