= Kindred Spirits (Zoe Rahman album) =

Studio album by Zoe Rahman
- Released: 23 January 2012
- Recorded: Spring 2011
- Genre: Jazz
- Length: 51:05
- Label: Manushi Records
- Producer: Zoe Rahman

Zoe Rahman chronology
Zoe Rahman Trio: Live (2012)	Kindred Spirits (2012)	Unison (2013)

Kindred Spirits is the fifth studio album by English jazz composer Zoe Rahman, released on 23 January 2012 by Manushi Records.

== Background and composition ==
Kindred Spirits is inspired by Zoe Rahman's discovery of the connections between Irish and Scottish folk music and the work of Bengali poet, composer and artist Rabindranath Tagore. The album includes three tracks written by Rabindranath Tagore and Stevie Wonder's "Contusion". Rahman wrote over half of the tracks

The album was recorded in spring 2011.

== Critical response ==
Professional ratings
Review scores
Source	Rating
The Guardian	4/5 stars
Jazz Journal	4/5 stars

John Fordham of The Guardian rated Kindred Spirits 4/5 and called the album "..a varied and widely appealing set..." Martin Longley of BBC Music called the album "A set melding its varied constituents into a deeply personal final form." ABC Online said of the album, it [sic] "stretches from ballads to McCoy Tyner-like muscularity and even a version of Contusion."

Chris May of All About Jazz said of the album, "It all adds up to another bliss infusion." Barry Witherden of Jazz Journal rated the album 4/5 and described it as a "McCoy Tyner style modalism, subcontinental raga and touches of Irish folk inspired by her [Rahman's] mother's Hibernian origins. Chris Parker of The Jazz Mann called the album "A rich confection..."

== Track listing ==
No.	Title	Length
1.	"Down to Earth"	6:24
2.	"Conversation with Nellie"	5:31
3.	"Maya"	6:24
4.	"Forbiddance / My Heart Dances, Like a Peacock, It Dances" (Hridoy Amar Nache Re / Mana Na Manili)	8:24
5.	"Butlers of Glen Avenue"	2:25
6.	"Outside In"	5:02
7.	"Imagination" (Hridoy Amar Prokash Holo)	3:06
8.	"Rise Above"	4:33
9.	"Fly in the Ointment"	5:26
10.	"Contusion"	3:50
Total length:		51:05

== Personnel ==
Musicians

- Zoe Rahman – piano, harmonium
- Gene Calderazzo – drums
- Oli Hayhurst – bass
- Idris Rahman – clarinet
- Courtney Pine – flute, alto saxophone

Technical

- Vinod Gadher – executive producer
- Curtis Schwartz – mix engineer, recording engineer
- Mandy Parnell – mastering engineer

== Awards and nominations ==
Year	Award	Category	Result
2012	MOBO Awards	Jazz category	Won
