= Melting Pot (Zoe Rahman album) =

Studio album by Zoe Rahman
- Released: 1 July 2006
- Genre: Jazz
- Length: 52:36
- Label: Manushi Records
- Producer: Zoe Rahman

Zoe Rahman chronology
The Cynic (2001)	Melting Pot (2006)	Where Rivers Meet (2008)

Melting Pot is the second studio album by English jazz composer Zoe Rahman, released on 1 July 2006 by Manushi Records.

== Critical response ==
Professional ratings
Review scores
Source	Rating
The Guardian	3/5 stars
The Penguin Guide to Jazz Recordings	3/4 stars

John Fordham of The Guardian rated Melting Pot 3/5 and said, "Rahman's wayward and mobile left-hand patterns swerving under crisp postbop swingers like Camel, soft meditations with repeating low themes emerging under treble trills (Shiraz), dense, hypnotic, multilinear entanglements like the funky The Calling or free-jazz tussles preceding soft rumination like No-One."

== Track listing ==
All lyrics are written by Zoe Rahman except "Mucche Jaoa Dinguli" by Hemant Mukherjee

No.	Title	Length
1.	"Camel"	6:14
2.	"J'Berg"	7:01
3.	"Shiraz"	8:33
4.	"The Calling"	5:00
5.	"Red Flower"	3:17
6.	"Last Note"	6:09
7.	"No One"	5:54
8.	"I'll Think About It"	5:08
9.	"Mucche Jaoa Dinguli"	5:16
Total length:		52:36

== Personnel ==
Musicians

- Zoe Rahman – piano
- Gene Calderazzo – drums
- Oli Hayhurst - bass
- Pat Illingworth – drums
- Jeremy Brown – bass
- Idris Rahman – clarinet
- Adriano Adewale Itaúna – udu

== Awards and nominations ==
Year	Award	Category	Result
2006	Mercury Music Prize	Album of the Year	Nominated
2006	Parliamentary Jazz Awards	Jazz Album of the Year	Won
