= The Lady Lies (disambiguation) =

The Lady Lies is a 1929 film.

The Lady Lies may also refer to:

- "The Lady Lies", a 1978 song by Genesis from ...And Then There Were Three...
- "The Lady Lies", a song by Zoe Rahman from the 2001 jazz album The Cynic
- The Lady Lies, a play produced by John McGowan (1894–1977)
