= Melampodium sericeum =

- Melampodium sericeum hooded cypselae

Scientific classification
- Kingdom: Plantae
- Clade: Tracheophytes
- Clade: Angiosperms
- Clade: Eudicots
- Clade: Asterids
- Order: Asterales
- Family: Asteraceae
- Genus: Melampodium
- Species: M. sericeum

Binomial name
- Melampodium sericeum Lag.

Synonyms
- Melampodium hispidum Kunth; Melampodium sericeum var. exappendiculatum B.L. Rob.

Species of plant

Floral head side view

Tiny floral heads with millimeter scale

Sericeous leaf undersurface

Young plant

Melampodium sericeum, sometimes known as rough blackfoot, is a species of flowering plant occurring from Mexico to El Salvador. It belongs to the family Asteraceae.

== Description ==
Within the Asteraceae, Melampodium sericeum is unusual for its remarkably small floral heads and the strange shapes of their one-seeded, cypsela-type fruits. Here are other features to look for in this species:

- It is an annual and herbaceous plant with hairy, erect or ascending stems reaching 40 cm (16 in) tall.
- Leaves varying in shape reach up to 6.5 cm × 3 cm (2 1/2 in × 1 1/4 in) and may or may not be deeply parted with up to 4 lobes. Both blade surfaces are conspicuously hairy, with dense hairs on the lower surface being pale and silky in texture and sheen.
- Floral heads enlarge to about 5 mm × 8 mm (3/16 in × 5/16 in). At their bases they have 5 hairy involucral bracts. At each head's perimeter there are 5-7 yellow, petal-like "ray florets" up to 2.2 mm × 1.2 mm (3/32 in × 1/16 in), though usually they are about half that size. These radiate from head's "eye," which consists of as many as 12 yellow "disc florets" with cylindrical corollas, with tubes only about 0.5 mm (1/32 in) long. Ray florets are fertile, producing fruits, while disc florets are sterile.
- One-seeded, cypsela-type fruits, up to 3.2 mm (1/8 in) long form a hood-like structure which may be blunt or taper to an appendage up to 2 mm (1/16 in) long. The cypsela's surface ranges from smooth to grooved or covered with low, rounded, wart-like bumps or projections.

== Distribution ==
In Mexico, Melampodium sericeum occurs from near the northwestern border with the USA southward through the uplands as far south as the southernmost state of Chiapas, plus nearly all of upland central Mexico, but it is absent from the Baja California Peninsula, the northeastern states, and in the southeast it is missing in the Yucatan Peninsula and the states of Campeche and Tabasco. In Central America it ranges from Guatemala south into Honduras, but is absent from Belize.

Sometimes Melampodium sericeum is reported from the US states of Arizona, Texas and farther north. These appear to report collections of the very similar Melampodium strigosum misidentified as Melampodium hispidum, a name later considered to be a synonym of Melampodium sericeum.

== Habitat ==
Throughout its distribution, Melampodium sericeum occurs in oak-pine forests at elevations from 1,100–2,590 m (3,610–8,500 ft). In the Valley of Mexico, it is found in dry scrub. Elsewhere in Mexico it is reported from roadsides, grassy areas, wet or periodically inundated locations, and in weedy agricultural and urban areas.

== Beekeeping value ==
In west-central Mexico, Melampodium sericeum is regarded as potentially of value to beekeeping because of its pollen production.

== Taxonomy ==
In 1816, Melampodium sericeum formally was described and named by Mariano Lagasca y Segura. Accompanying his description he remarked that the taxon inhabited New Spain, the capital of which was Mexico City. He reported that his described material was from seeds brought [to Spain] by the late D. D. Sessé (Martín Sessé y Lacasta) and Mocinno (José Mariano Mociño).

=== Phylogeny ===
Melampodium sericeum is hexaploid; it has six sets of chromosomes (6x or 6n), not the two sets (2x or 2n) usually found among regular flowering plants. Studies involving DNA sequencing indicate that Melampodium sericeum arose from two other species, one of which was the tetraploid (4n) Melapodium strigosum and the other the diploid (2n) Melampodium linearilobum. When species arise with more than the normal two sets (2n), the fully formed new species appear instantaneously, not through the slow, time-taking process of gradually accumulating changes in the genes. In the case of the hexaploid (6n) Melampodium sericeum, one of the parent species itself, the tetraploid (4n) Melapodium strigosum, also had arisen spontaneously.

Being equipped with more than the normal supply of chromosomes may have benefits for the newly minted species. Evidence is growing supporting the "general-purpose genotype hypothesis", which suggests that polyploidy may impart to the new species increased tolerance to environmental stresses. The wide variety of habitats in which Melampodium sericeum occurs seems to support this theory.

=== Etymology ===
The genus name Melampodium apparently derives from the name Melampus, in Greek mythology considered a legendary soothsayer.

The species name sericeum is from the Latin sericeus, meaning "silken." This aptly describes the silky appearance and feeling of the species' leaf undersurfaces.
