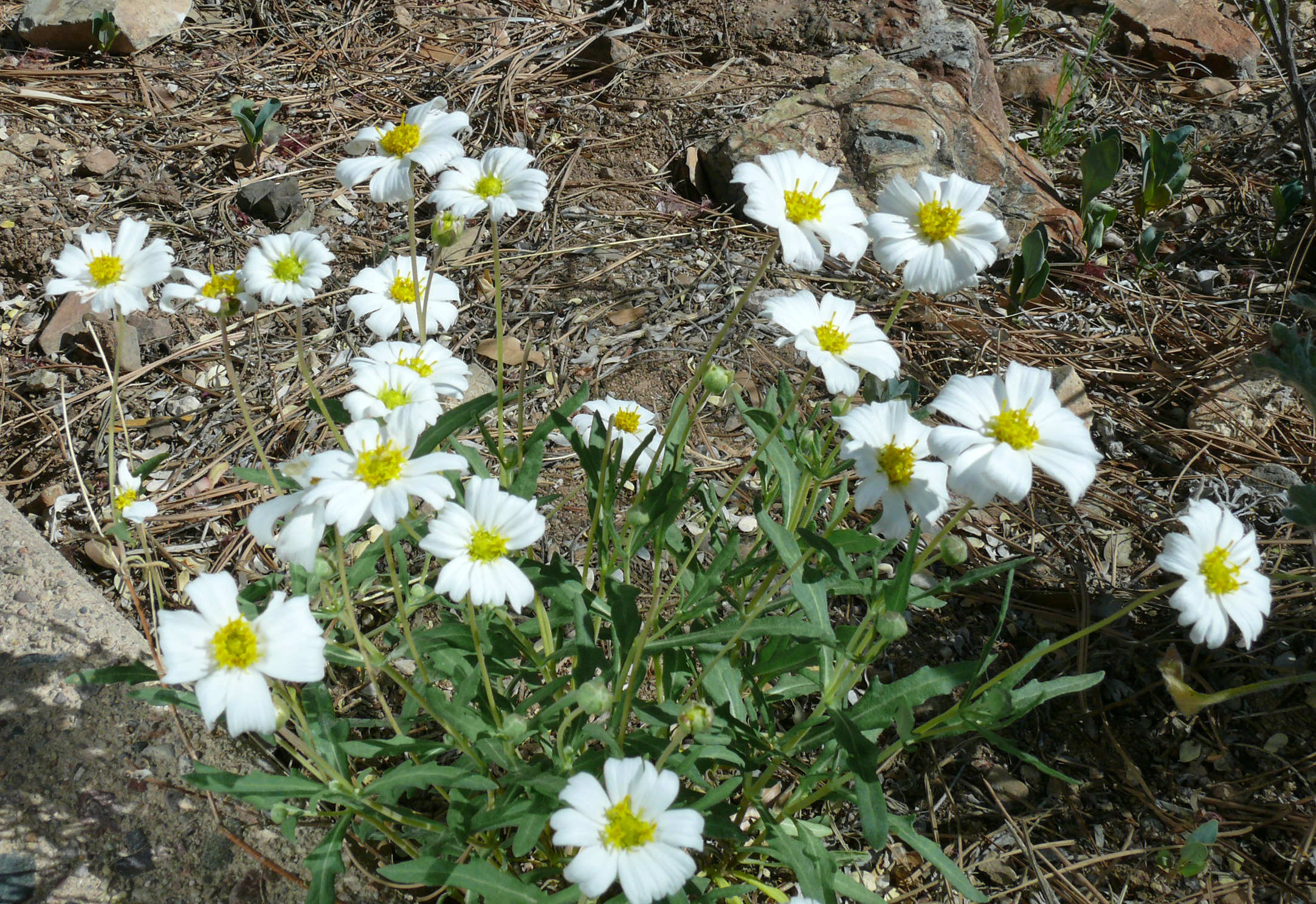

Conservation status
- Secure (NatureServe)

Scientific classification
- Kingdom: Plantae
- Clade: Tracheophytes
- Clade: Angiosperms
- Clade: Eudicots
- Clade: Asterids
- Order: Asterales
- Family: Asteraceae
- Genus: Melampodium
- Species: M. leucanthum

Binomial name
- Melampodium leucanthum Torr. & A.Gray

= Melampodium leucanthum =

Species of flowering plant

Melampodium leucanthum, the plains blackfoot or blackfoot daisy, is an herbaceous perennial plant in the family Asteraceae found on rocky slopes in the southwest U.S. It is an attractive ornamental, blooming from March to November.

== Description ==
It grows 15–50 centimetres (6–19 1/2 in) tall while spreading 30–61 cm (1–2 ft) wide.

The leaves are roughly 2–5 cm (1–2 in) long and are covered in hairs. It blooms from March to November. The center of the flower is a composite flowerhead with up to 50 individual yellow flowers. Surrounding the composite head are 8 to 13 white ray petals with a distinctive notch on their outer end.

The plant has a short lifespan and dies in the wintertime, but its self-seeding process resurrects it from seed.

=== Similar species ===
It resembles Zinnia acerosa, which has fewer ray petals and does not appear as far south.

== Distribution and habitat ==
While the plant thrives on limestone-containing rocky slopes, it is also found in southwest Kansas and southeast Colorado, as well as in Oklahoma. It is found in high plains as well as mesas and the desert slopes of the Sonoran Desert.

== Cultivation ==
In is grown as an ornamental in rocky gardens for its drought-tolerant properties and showy flowers, growing up to 1.2 m (4 ft) in height in cultivation.
