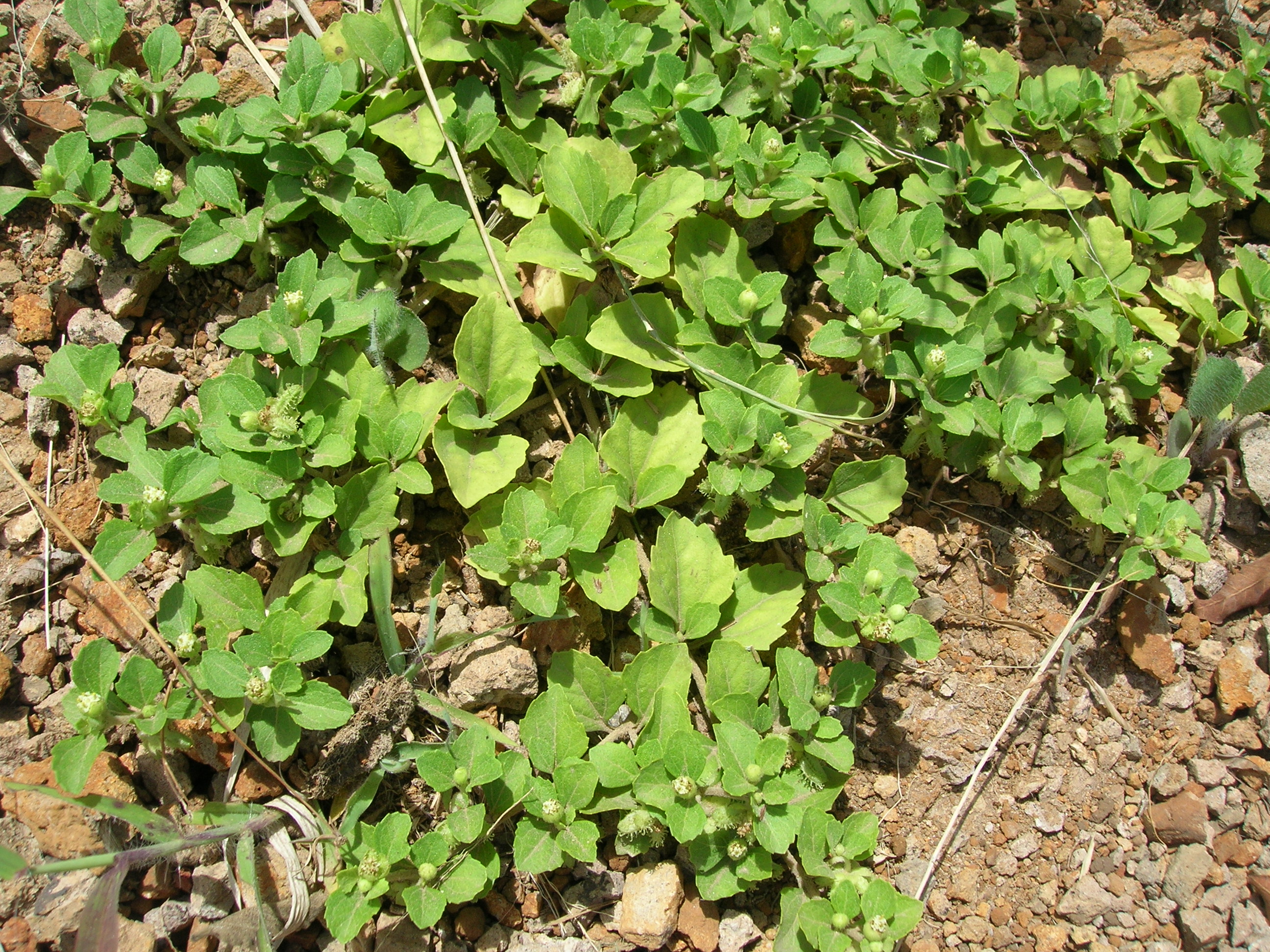
- Acanthospermum australe

Scientific classification
- Kingdom: Plantae
- Clade: Tracheophytes
- Clade: Angiosperms
- Clade: Eudicots
- Clade: Asterids
- Order: Asterales
- Family: Asteraceae
- Subfamily: Asteroideae
- Tribe: Millerieae
- Subtribe: Melampodiinae
- Genus: Acanthospermum; Schrank, 1820

Synonyms
- Centrospermum Kunth; Echinodium Poit. ex Cass.; Orcya Vell.

= Acanthospermum =

Genus of flowering plants

Acanthospermum is a genus of plants in the family Asteraceae, also known as starburrs or starburs. It was described as a genus in 1820.

== Taxonomy ==
=== Species ===
As of July 2023, Plants of the World Online has 6 accepted species:

- Acanthospermum australe (Loefl.) Kuntze - South America
- Acanthospermum consobrinum S.F.Blake - Paraguay
- Acanthospermum glabratum (DC.) Wild. - Southeast Brazil
- Acanthospermum hispidum DC. - South America
- Acanthospermum humile (Sw.) DC. - West Indies
- Acanthospermum microcarpum B.L.Rob. - Ecuador including Galápagos
