= Acanthospermum consobrinum =

Scientific classification
- Kingdom: Plantae
- Clade: Tracheophytes
- Clade: Angiosperms
- Clade: Eudicots
- Clade: Asterids
- Order: Asterales
- Family: Asteraceae
- Genus: Acanthospermum
- Species: A. consobrinum

Binomial name
- Acanthospermum consobrinum S.F.Blake.

Species of plant

Acanthospermum consobrinum is a member of the family Asteraceae and is an endemic species found in Paraguay.
