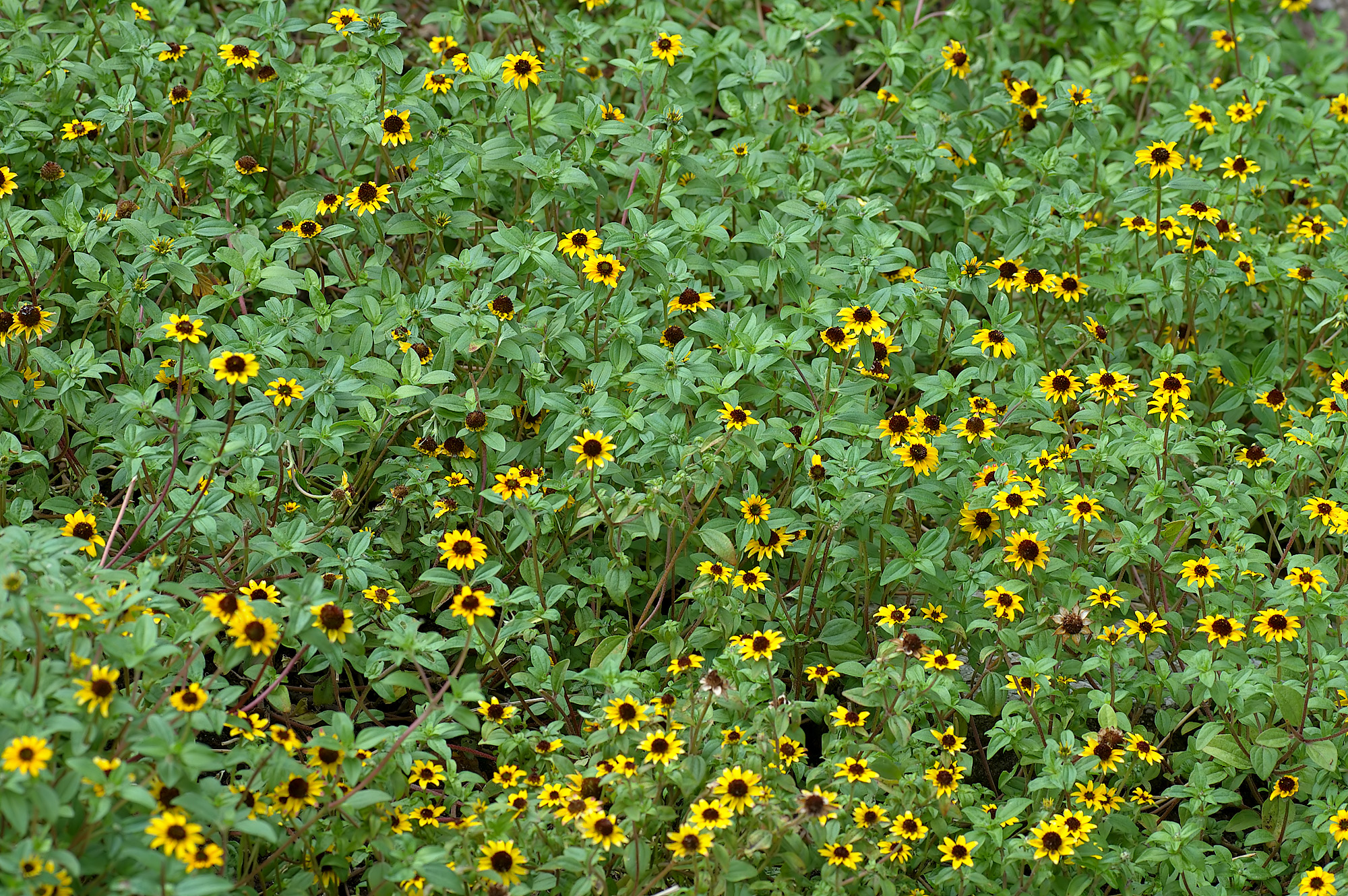
- Sanvitalia procumbens

Scientific classification
- Kingdom: Plantae
- Clade: Tracheophytes
- Clade: Angiosperms
- Clade: Eudicots
- Clade: Asterids
- Order: Asterales
- Family: Asteraceae
- Subfamily: Asteroideae
- Tribe: Heliantheae
- Subtribe: Zinniinae
- Genus: Sanvitalia; Lam. 1792

Type species
- Sanvitalia procumbens Lam.

Synonyms IPNI_{1}, IPNI_{2},
- Laurentia Steud.; Lorentea Ortega

= Sanvitalia =

Genus of flowering plants

Sanvitalia /ˌsænvɪˈteɪliə/), the creeping zinnias, is a genus of flowering plants belonging to the family Asteraceae. They are native mostly to Mexico, with a few species in Central America, South America, and the Southwestern United States.

Species

- Sanvitalia abertii A.Gray - Abert's creeping zinnia - Mexico (Sonora), southwestern United States (CA NV AZ NM TX)
- Sanvitalia angustifolia Engelm. ex A.Gray - Coahuila, Chihuahua, Guanajuato, Nuevo León, San Luis Potosí; introduced in western Texas
- Sanvitalia fruticosa Hemsl. - Puebla, Oaxaca, Guanajuato
- Sanvitalia ocymoides DC. -- yellow creeping zinnia - Tamaulipas, Nuevo León, Texas
- Sanvitalia procumbens Lam. - Mexican creeping zinnia - Mexico from Chihuahua to Chiapas; Central America; naturalized in scattered locations in Europe, East Asia, South America, and United States
- Sanvitalia versicolor Griseb. - Bolivia, Paraguay, Argentina

Note: Sanvitalia speciosa is a term commonly used in the horticultural trade, but this is not a validly published name. Many specimens so labelled are not even Sanvitalia, and are most likely Melampodium.
