= Unison (George Mraz and Zoe Rahman album) =

Studio album by George Mraz and Zoe Rahman
- Released: 13 July 2013
- Recorded: Greville Lodge in Cheltenham, Gloucestershire
- Genre: Jazz
- Length: 54:37
- Label: Cube-Metier
- Producer: Paul Vlcek

George Mraz chronology
Moravian Gems (2007)	Unison (2013)	Together Again (2014)

Zoe Rahman chronology
Kindred Spirits (2012)	Unison (2013)

Unison is a studio album by musicians George Mraz and Zoe Rahman, released on 15 July 2013 by Cube-Metier.

== Background ==
Music producer Paul Vlcek sought Zoe Rahman out to play with George Mraz from amongst the most talented British jazz pianists.

== Critical reception ==
Steve Arloff of MusicWeb International said of Unison, "...this superb disc of beautiful chamber jazz because it truly represents the meeting of minds of two superlative musicians who, would you believe, met for the first time only on the afternoon of this, the third in a series of concerts held for charity."

== Track listing ==
No.	Title	Lyrics	Length
1.	"Unison"	George Mraz	5:04
2.	"Wisteria"	Mraz	8:51
3.	"Three Silver Hairs"	Mraz	5:49
4.	"Blues for Sarka"	Mraz	6:54
5.	"April Sun"	Zoe Rahman	7:09
6.	"Grey Falcon, Little Apple"	Traditional	9:19
7.	"Pennyroyal"	Traditional	6:39
8.	"Cinema Paradiso" (Love Theme)	Andrea Morricone and Ennio Morricone	4:52
Total length:			54:37

== Personnel ==
Musicians

- Zoe Rahman – piano
- George Mraz – bass
