= Porpoise Corpus =

UK musical group

Porpoise Corpus is a forward-looking jazz ensemble composed of David O'Brien, Tom Ward, Tom Challenger, Spencer Brown, Jonathan Bratoeff (from the F-IRE Collective) and Guy Wood.

They are the 2006 recipients of the Peter Whittingham Award for young British jazz musicians.
