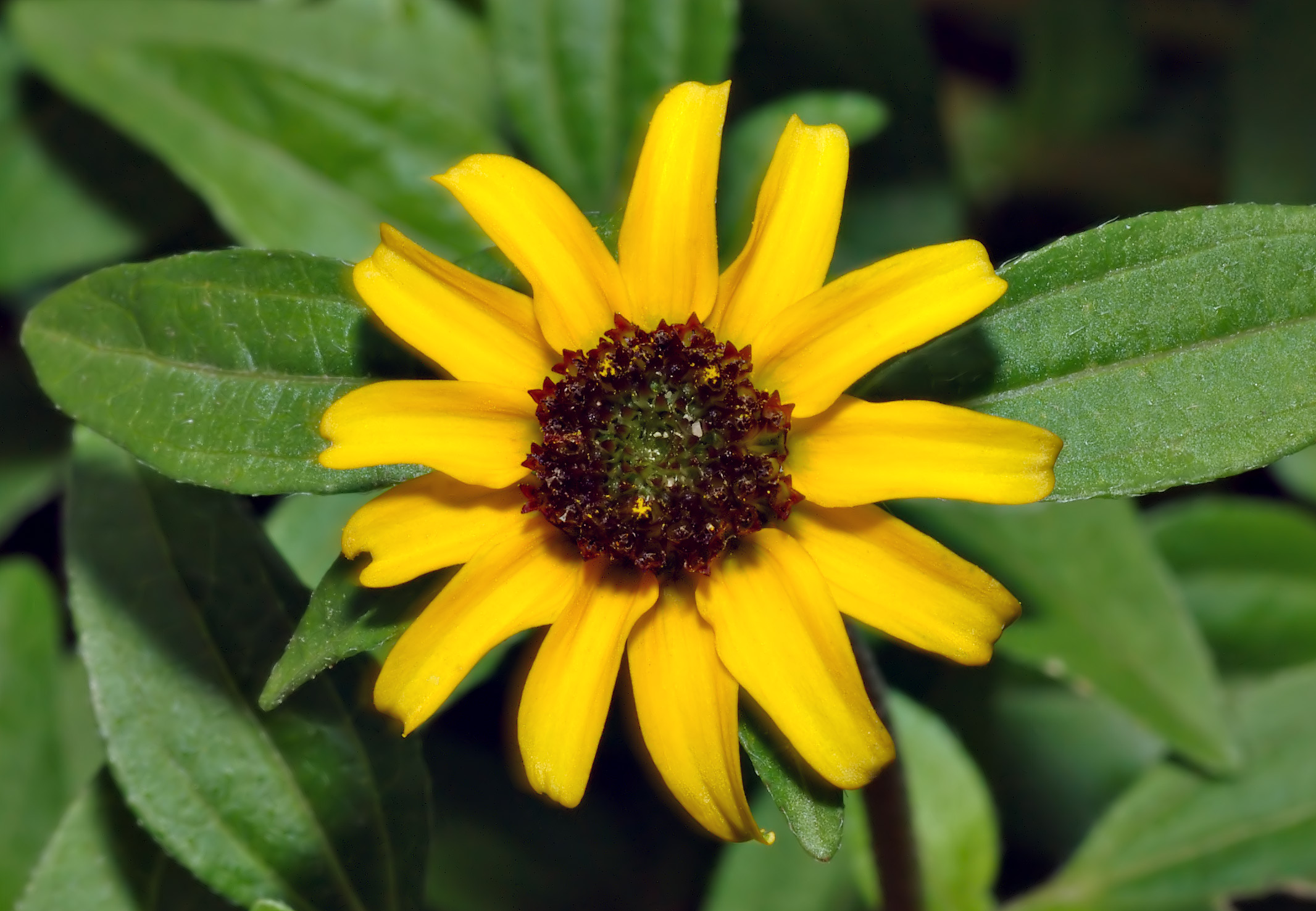

Scientific classification
- Kingdom: Plantae
- Clade: Tracheophytes
- Clade: Angiosperms
- Clade: Eudicots
- Clade: Asterids
- Order: Asterales
- Family: Asteraceae
- Tribe: Heliantheae
- Genus: Sanvitalia
- Species: S. procumbens

Binomial name
- Sanvitalia procumbens Lam. 1792 Source: IPNI UniProt

= Sanvitalia procumbens =

Species of plant

Sanvitalia procumbens with the common name of Mexican creeping zinnia is the type species of the genus Sanvitalia and a member of the family Asteraceae and tribe Heliantheae.
