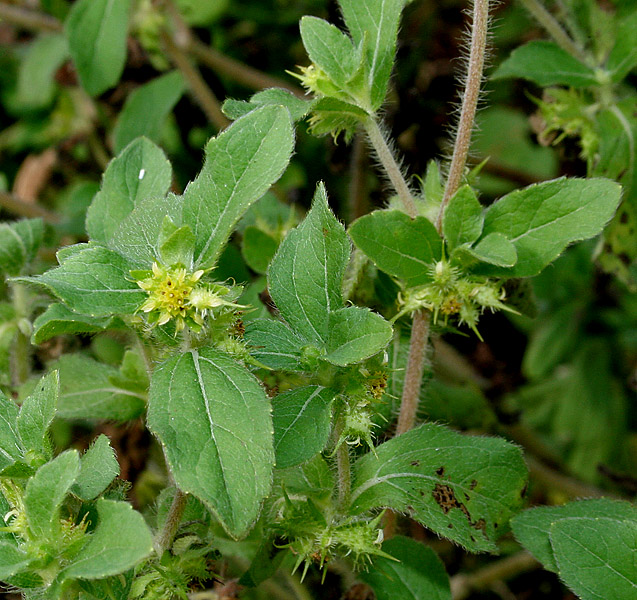
- In Goa, India

Scientific classification
- Kingdom: Plantae
- Clade: Tracheophytes
- Clade: Angiosperms
- Clade: Eudicots
- Clade: Asterids
- Order: Asterales
- Family: Asteraceae
- Genus: Acanthospermum
- Species: A. hispidum

Binomial name
- Acanthospermum hispidum D.C. 1836 not A.Chev. 1920

= Acanthospermum hispidum =

Species of flowering plant

Acanthospermum hispidum (bristly starbur, goat's head, hispid starburr, starbur) is an annual plant in the family Asteraceae, which is native to Central and South America. This plant is cited as a weed in cotton culture in Brazil, and it is also used as a medicinal plant. It is also naturalized in many scattered places in Eurasia, Africa, and North America. It is widespread in Australia, mostly occurring from north-eastern Western Australia through much of the Northern Territory and Queensland to north-eastern New South Wales. It is declared a weed in Western Australia and the Northern Territory.

== See also ==
- Goat's head — other plants with common name "goat's head"
