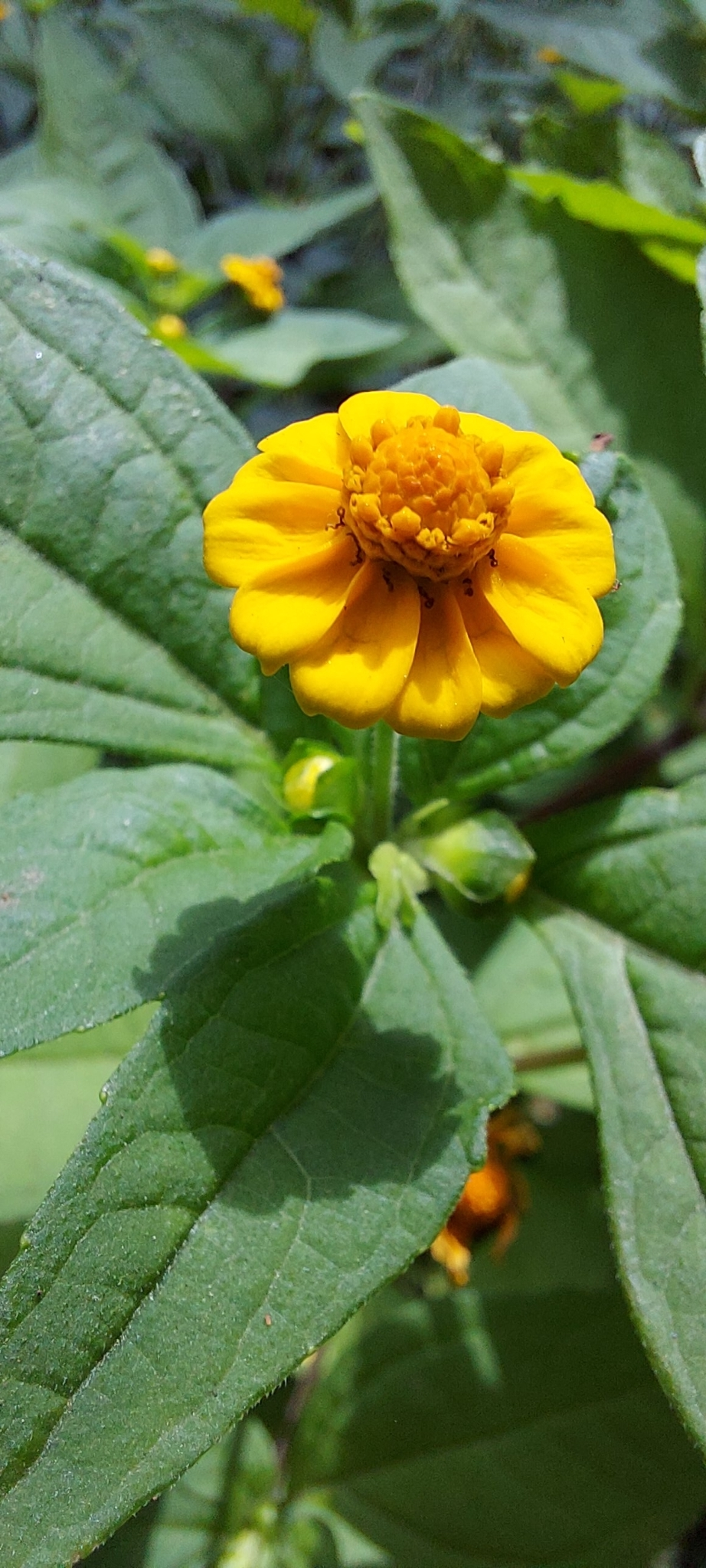

Scientific classification
- Kingdom: Plantae
- Clade: Tracheophytes
- Clade: Angiosperms
- Clade: Eudicots
- Clade: Asterids
- Order: Asterales
- Family: Asteraceae
- Genus: Melampodium
- Species: M. divaricatum

Binomial name
- Melampodium divaricatum (Rich.) DC.

= Melampodium divaricatum =

Species of flowering plant

Melampodium divaricatum, also known by its common name gold medallion is a species of flowering plant from the genus Melampodium. The species was first described in 1836.
