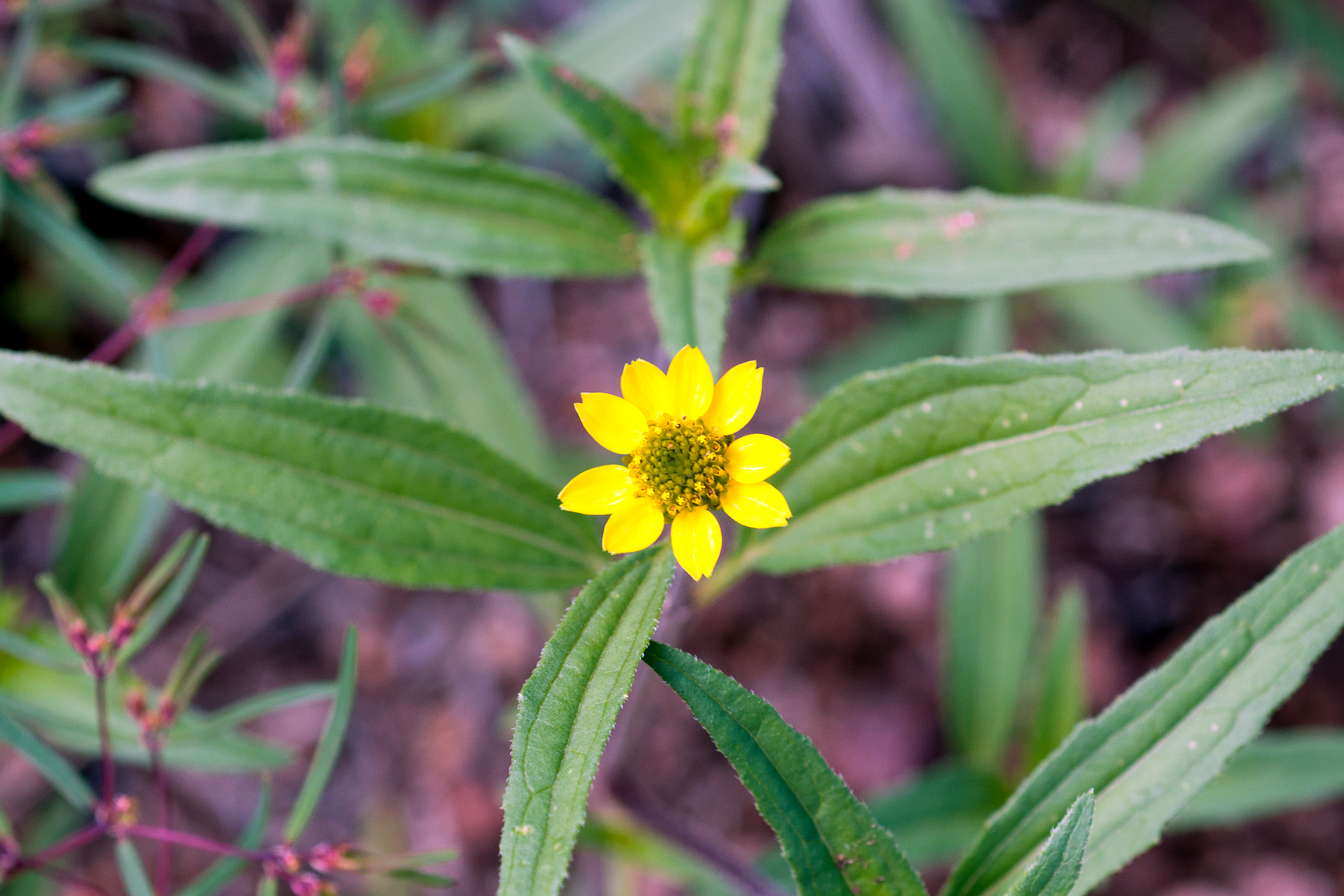

Scientific classification
- Kingdom: Plantae
- Clade: Tracheophytes
- Clade: Angiosperms
- Clade: Eudicots
- Clade: Asterids
- Order: Asterales
- Family: Asteraceae
- Genus: Sanvitalia
- Species: S. abertii

Binomial name
- Sanvitalia abertii A.Gray

= Sanvitalia abertii =

Species of plant

Sanvitalia abertii is a species of flowering plant in the family Asteraceae known by the common names Abert's creeping zinnia and Abert's sanvitalia. It is native to the southwestern United States and northern Mexico, where it grows in desert scrub, desert mountains and woodlands. It is an annual herb somewhat variable in appearance. The mainly erect stem may be 2 to 29 centimeters tall, and simple or with many branches. The linear or lance-shaped leaves are a few centimeters long. The plant is coated in rough hairs. The inflorescence is a cyme of flower heads with thick, leathery yellow ray florets 2 or 3 millimeters long and notched at the tips. The fruit is an achene. Achenes arising from the ray florets are light-colored and tipped with pappi, while those from the disc florets at the center of the flower head are darker and lack pappi.
