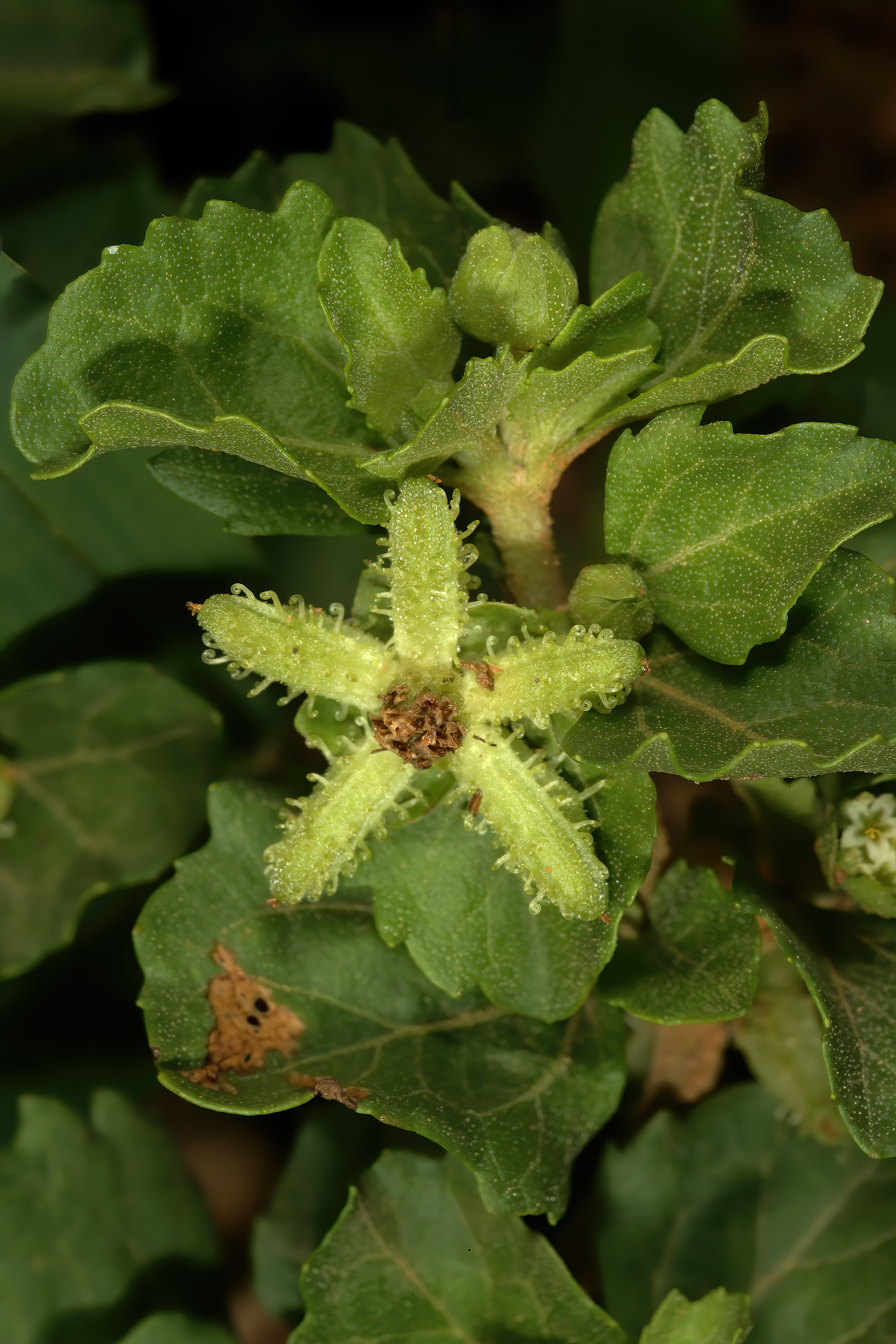

Scientific classification
- Kingdom: Plantae
- Clade: Tracheophytes
- Clade: Angiosperms
- Clade: Eudicots
- Clade: Asterids
- Order: Asterales
- Family: Asteraceae
- Genus: Acanthospermum
- Species: A. glabratum

Binomial name
- Acanthospermum glabratum (DC.) Wild

= Acanthospermum glabratum =

Species of flowering plant

Acanthospermum glabratum, known as creeping starbur, is a species of flowering plant in the family Asteraceae native to southeastern Brazil.

The species is an annual forb with short, glandular leaves that are toothed. Flowers are pale yellow, and fruit is an achene. The species grows in disturbed habitat. Although native to South America, it has become introduced in southern Africa and the United States.
