= Julia Biel =

British singer, songwriter and musician (born 1976)

- Born: London, England
- Genres: Jazz
- Occupations: Musician, composer, songwriter
- Instruments: Vocals, piano, guitar
- Labels: Rokit, Khanti, Brilljant Sounds
- Website: www.juliabiel.com

Julia Biel (born 1976) is a British jazz singer, songwriter, and multi-instrumentalist.

== Early life ==
Biel was born in London on 22 February 1976. She was brought up in Sutton, then studied French and German at the University of Oxford. There, she was in a band with Idris Rahman. She was a pianist first, then developed her singing.

== Later life and career ==
Biel won the Perrier Young Jazz Vocalist of the Year in 2000, which brought her more attention. She then joined the F-IRE Collective. In 2005 she made her recording debut as a leader, with the album Not Alone. She also appeared on the Polar Bear album Dimlit. Her compositions appear on the Unity Collective EP Love in the Dead of Night and on recordings by guitarist Jonny Phillips. She also featured on and co-wrote Ben Watt's "Guinea Pig" and "Bright Star" alongside Watt and the German producer Stimming.

Her second album, Love Letters and Other Missiles, was released in 2015 and led to her being nominated in the Best Jazz Act category for the MOBO Awards.

She performs accompanying herself on piano or electric guitar with backing from bass and drums and tours extensively in the UK and abroad.

== Discography ==
=== As leader ===
- 2005: Not Alone (album)
- 2014: Nobody Loves You Like I Do (EP)
- 2015: Love Letters and Other Missiles (album)
- 2015: Licence to Be Cruel (remixes EP)
- 2018: Julia Biel (album)
- 2020: Black and White, Vol.1 (album)

=== As guest ===
With Polar Bear

- 2004: Dimlit
- 2007: Polar Bear

With Soothsayers

- 2012: Human Nature
- 2018: Tradition

With others

- 2004: Oriole – "Song for the Sleeping"
- 2004: Unity Collective – Love in the Dead of Night
- 2008: Ben Watt ft. Julia Biel – "Guinea Pig"
- 2010: Stimming, Ben Watt & Julia Biel – "Bright Star"
- 2015: Alaev ft. Julia Biel - "Light as a feather"
