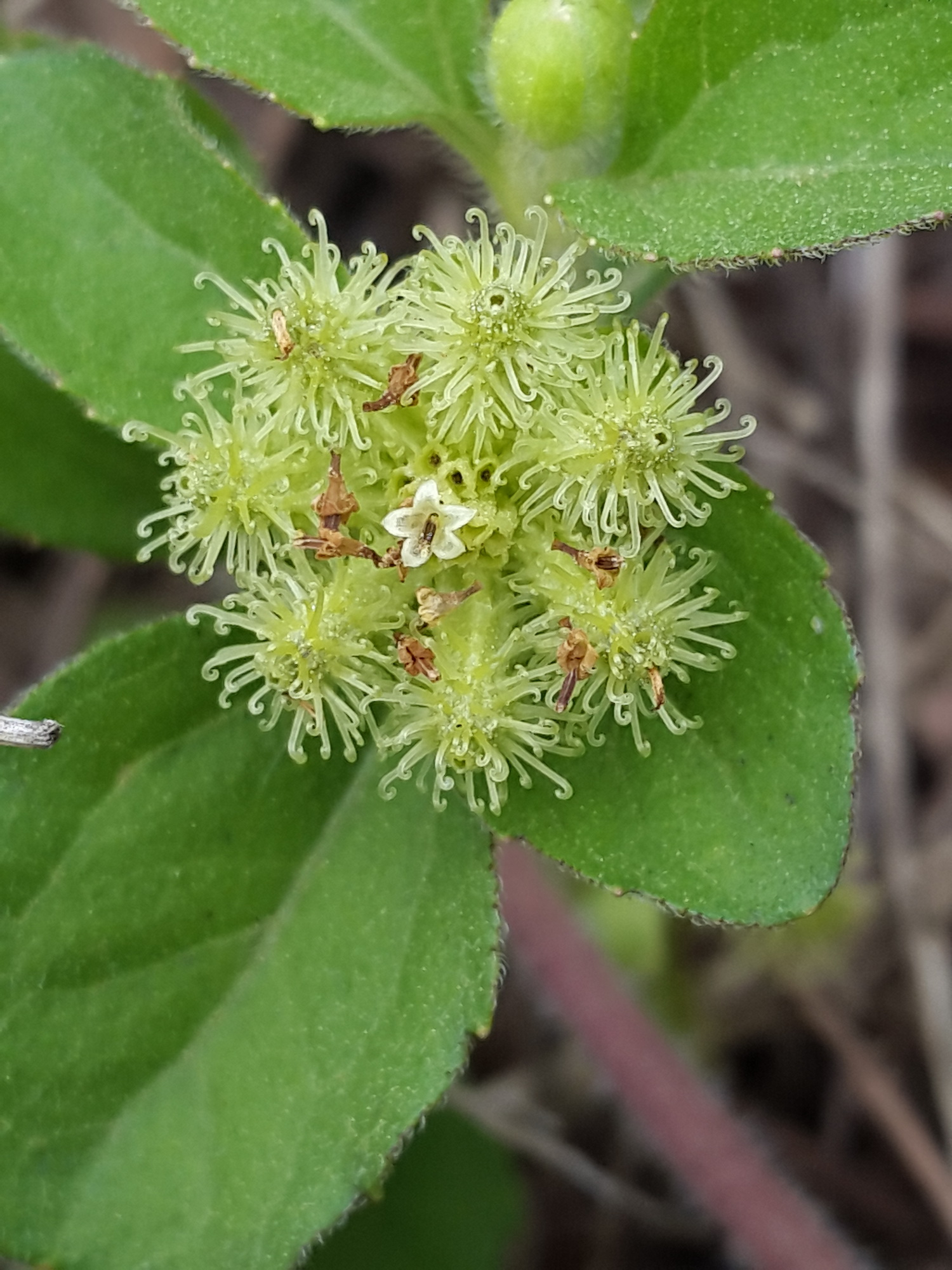

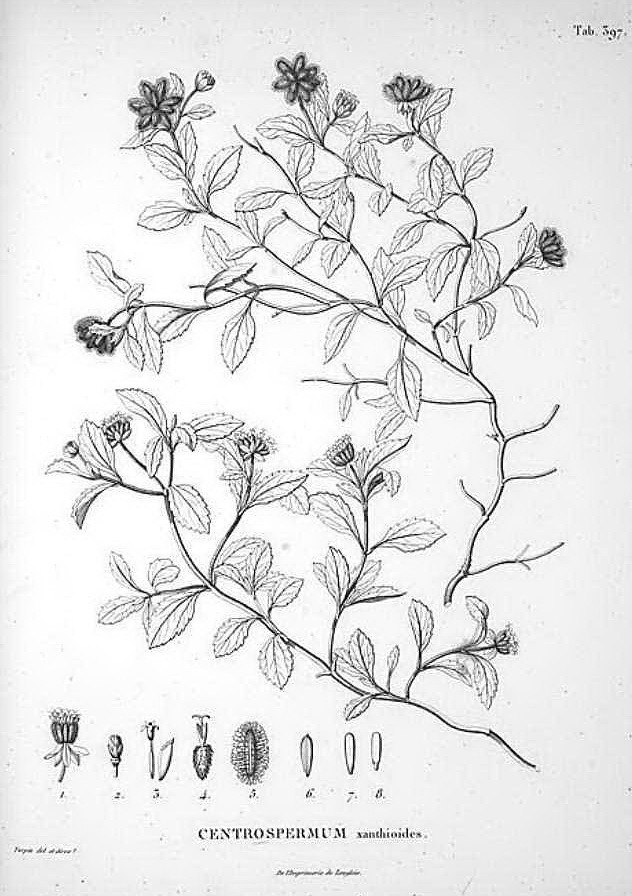
- 1820 illustration

Scientific classification
- Kingdom: Plantae
- Clade: Tracheophytes
- Clade: Angiosperms
- Clade: Eudicots
- Clade: Asterids
- Order: Asterales
- Family: Asteraceae
- Genus: Acanthospermum
- Species: A. australe

Binomial name
- Acanthospermum australe (Loefl.) Kuntze

Synonyms
- Synonymy: Acanthospermum brasilum Schrank; Acanthospermum hirsutum DC.; Acanthospermum xanthioides (Kunth) DC.; Acanthospermum xanthioides var. obtusifolium DC.; Centrospermum xanthioides Kunth; Echinodium prostratum Poit.; Melampodium australe Loefl.; Orcya adhaerens Vell.; Orcya adhaerescens Vell.

= Acanthospermum australe =

Species of flowering plant

Acanthospermum australe (Paraguayan starburr, ihi kukae hipa, Paraguay bur, Paraguay starbur, pipili, sheepbur, or spiny-bur) is a South American species of herbaceous plants first described as a species in 1758.

== Distribution ==
The species is native to:

- South America, within Brazil, French Guiana, Guyana, Suriname, Venezuela, Argentina, Paraguay, Uruguay, Bolivia, and Colombia
- Caribbean, within Grenada; Martinique; St. Vincent, and Grenadines

It has been introduced in China, and is an invasive species in parts of the United States, Canada, and South Africa. It is currently a widespread pioneer in the tropics and sub-tropics.

== Extracts ==
Extracts of Acanthospermum australe have in vitro antiviral activity against herpesvirus and poliovirus, but clinical effects have not been studied.
