= Goat's head =

Goat's head is a common name for several plants and may refer to:

- Acanthospermum hispidum, a plant in the family Asteraceae, native to Central and South America. Its seeds are shaped like the head of a goat.
- Proboscidea louisianica, a plant in the family Martyniaceae, is probably native to parts of the southwestern United States and Mexico in North America. The dried fruit has multiple horns.
- Tribulus terrestris, a plant in the family Zygophyllaceae, native to warm temperate and tropical regions of the Old World in southern Europe, southern Asia, throughout Africa, and Australia. It produces spiky seeds that are shaped like caltrops.
Plants named goat's head
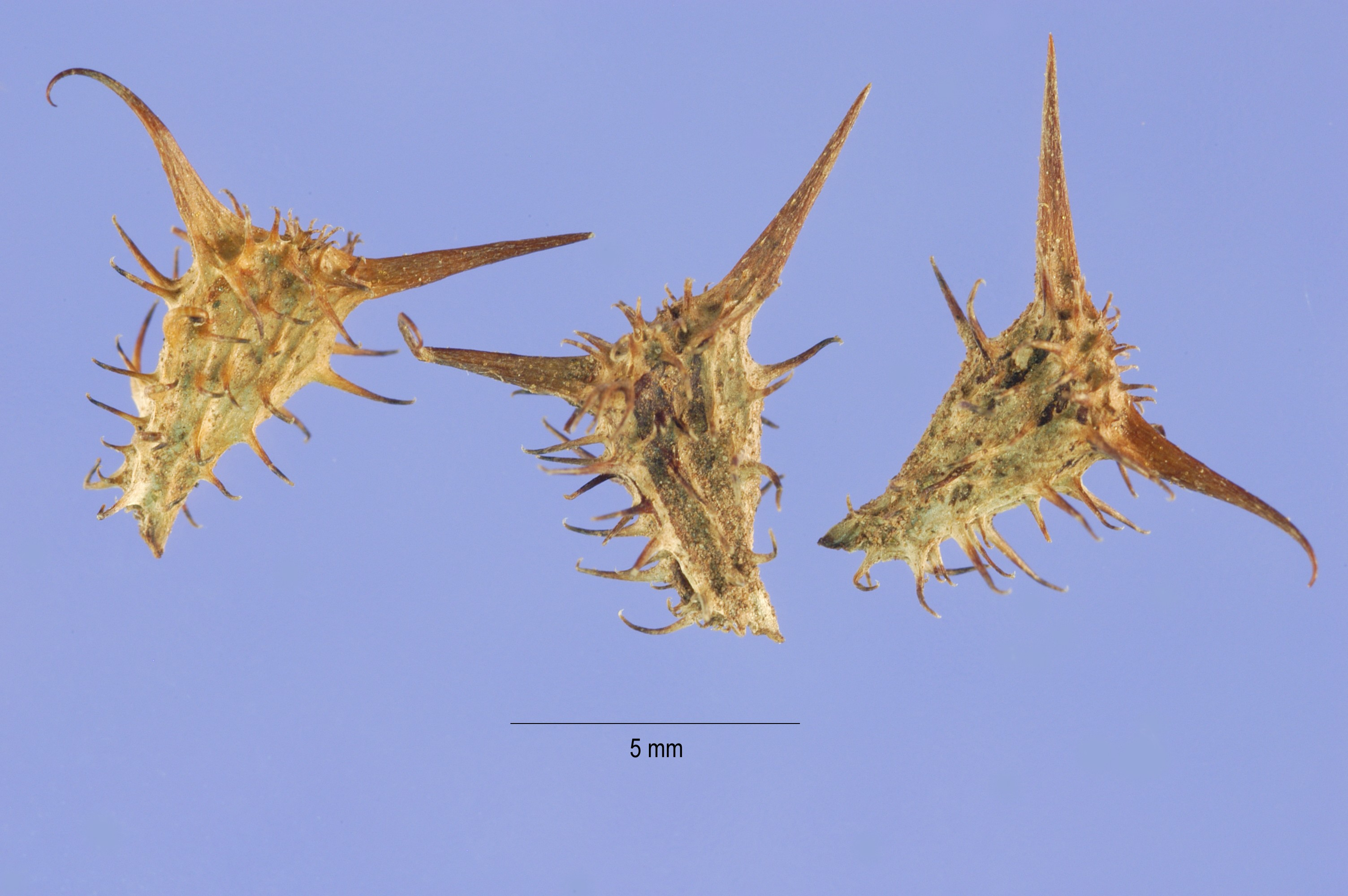
Seeds of Acanthospermum hispidum

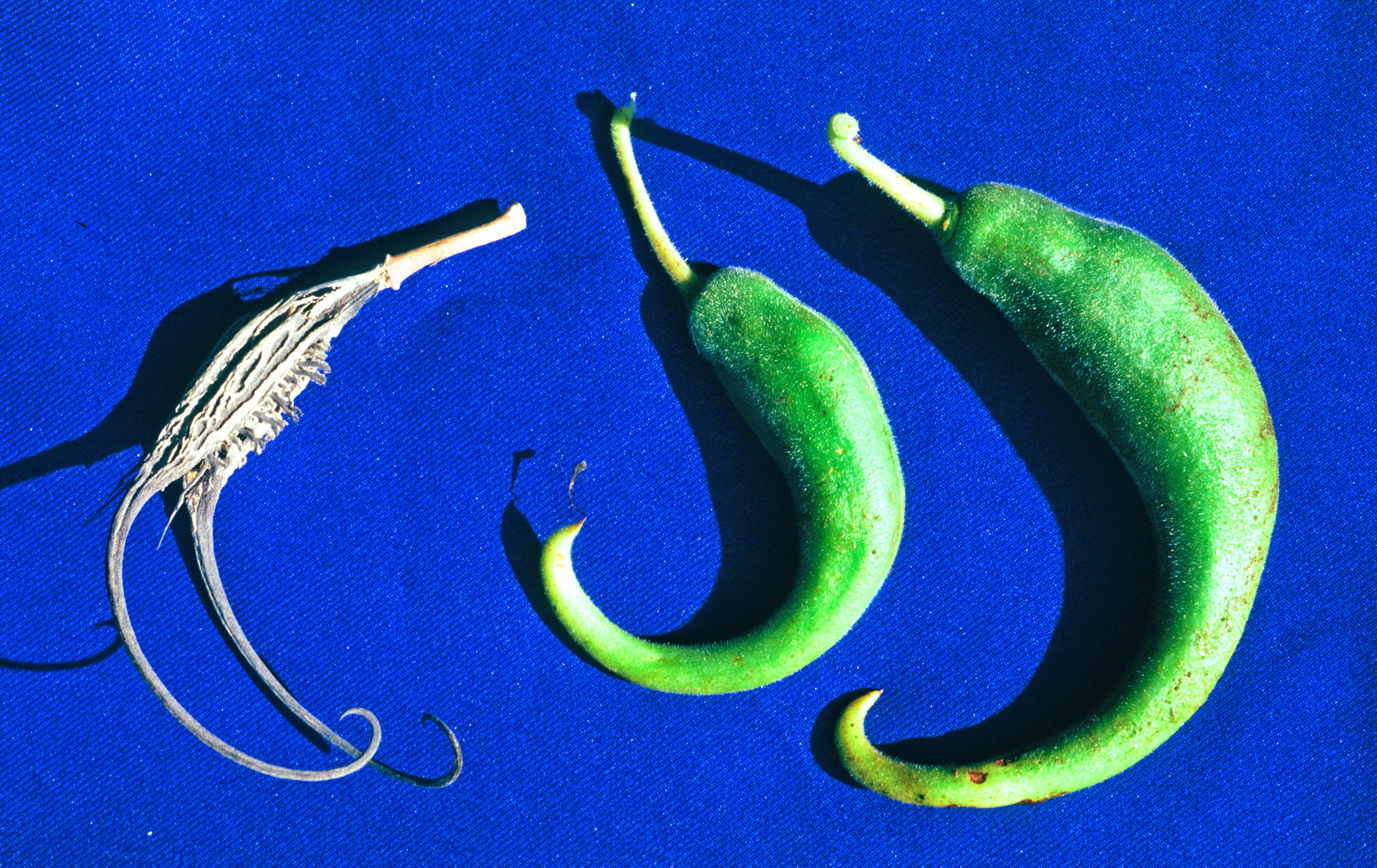
Fruit of Proboscidea louisianica

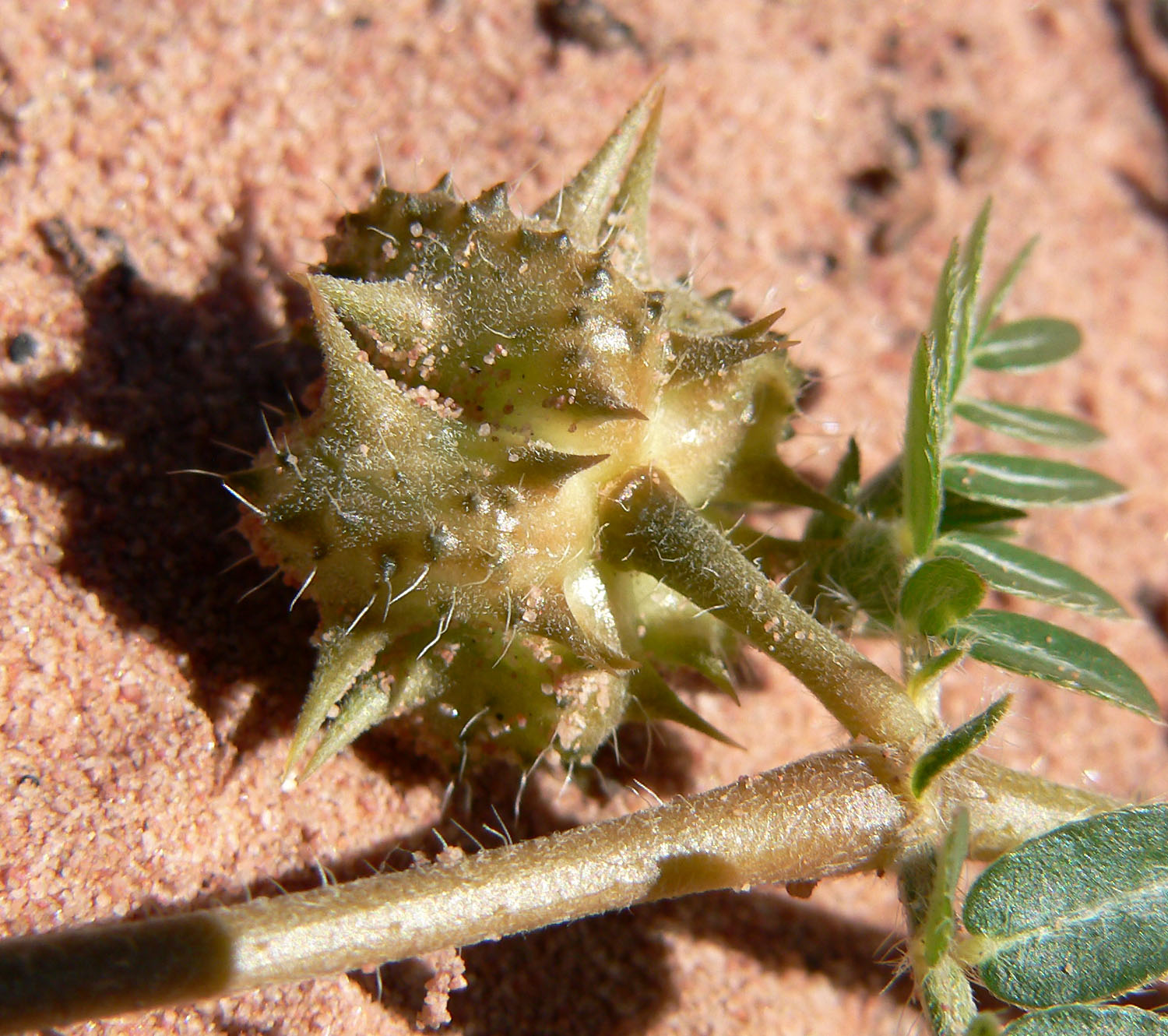
Fruit of Tribulus terrestris
