= Jerry Dammers =

British musician (born 1955)

Jerry Dammers GCOT
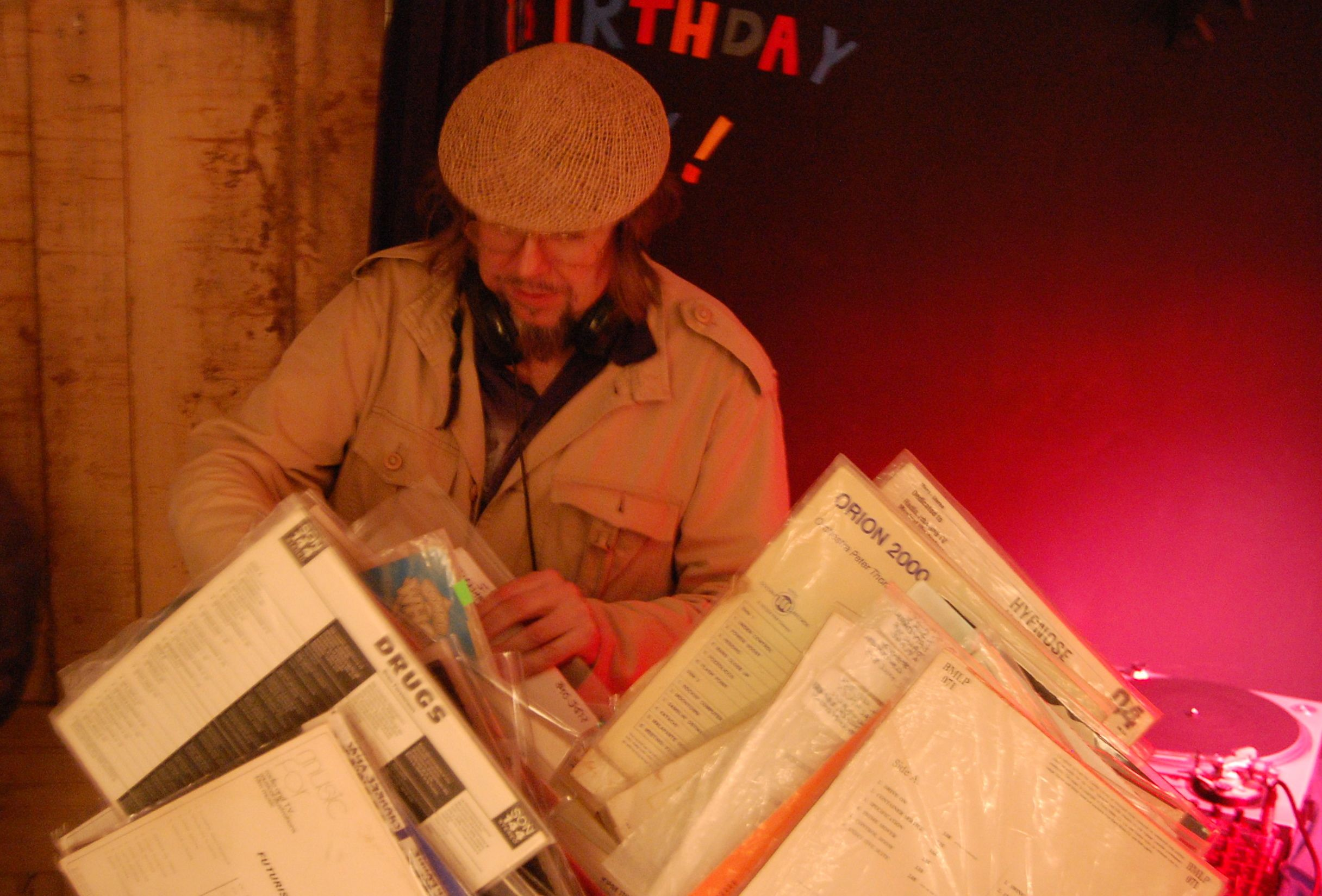
- Jerry Dammers DJing in 2009

Background information
- Born: Jeremy David Hounsell Dammers; 22 May 1955 (age 71); Ootacamund, Tamil Nadu, India
- Origin: Coventry, England
- Genres: Ska, 2 tone
- Occupations: Keyboardist, songwriter, DJ
- Instruments: Keyboards, turntables
- Years active: 1977–present
- Label: 2 Tone Records (as per The Specials)
- Formerly of: The Specials, the Special AKA, the Spatial AKA Orchestra

Jeremy David Hounsell Dammers (born 22 May 1955) is a British musician who was a founder, keyboard player and primary songwriter of the Coventry-based ska band the Specials (also known as the Special A.K.A.) and later the Spatial AKA Orchestra. Dammers is a pivotal figure of the ska revival through his foundation of the label 2 Tone Records, his work blending political lyrics and punk with Jamaican music, and his incorporation of 1960s retro clothing. He has also been acknowledged for his work in promoting racial unity.

== Early life ==
Dammers was born on 22 May 1955 in Ootacamund, Tamil Nadu, South India, the son of Horace Dammers, who was later Dean of Bristol Cathedral from 1973 to 1987.Jerry Dammers' family is of Hanoverian origin; his great-great-grandfather was Adjutant-General to King George V of Hanover.

He left India aged two, first living in Sheffield, then moving to Coventry at the age of 10, where he attended the elite private King Henry VIII School. His initial music influences were '60s bands like the Who, the Small Faces and the Kinks, which made him want to be in a band, and he was also influenced by soul music.

Dammers was a young mod in the 1960s while at school then became a hippie, before becoming a skinhead. Dammers decided at the age of 10 he was going to have a band, and spent his teenage years learning music and writing songs. He played in a range of bands, from reggae punk to country and western. Dammers had been a member of the Cissy Stone Soul Band, but he could not get them to play any of his work. He studied art at Coventry's Lanchester Polytechnic (now Coventry University), where he met Horace Panter. Frustrated at only doing covers, Dammers was asked to leave the Cissy Stone Soul band, and then played keyboards with Hard Top 22, a reggae band that had many members who would later become the Selecter.

== Career ==
=== The Specials ===
Dammers was one of the founding members of ska revivalist band the Specials. Prior to the Specials, Dammers had played with Neol Davies and other reggae musicians who would later form the Selecter. He had written songs in his teens, and his idea in forming the Specials was that it would combine reggae and punk. He formed the band, initially called the Coventry Automatics, with vocalist Tim Strickland, guitarist/vocalist Lynval Golding, drummer Silverton Hutchinson, and bassist Horace Panter in 1977. He then asked Terry Hall to join. Hall was performing vocals with Squad and Roddy Radiation, both of whom were part of the local Coventry punk scene. Dammers has said that anti-racism was a key element of the band, and the Rock Against Racism movement was formed at the same time. He also saw the Specials as an opportunity to integrate white and black people through the same music, and he picked members to make the band multi-racial. Until this time, white British people mainly played rock, blues and jazz, while black British people played reggae, jazz, and soul. The Specials was an opportunity to have black and white people in the same band, something not common at the time, through playing ska.

GQ editor Dylan Jones noted that the Specials differed from other ska bands at the time because of Dammers’ political messages in the Specials' lyrics. After talking their way onto a tour with the Clash, then a better-known group, Dammers pushed the Specials to adopt the mod/rude boy fashion sub-culture, and this look was copied by fans of the band.

They released two albums, The Specials, which was successful, and More Specials, which was less so.

After some issues with Roddy Radiation not being able to play, Neville Staple, Terry Hall and Lynval Golding at this point left the band to form Fun Boy Three.

=== The Special AKA and "Free Nelson Mandela" ===
The band changed its lineup and rebadged as the Special AKA, releasing another album and the single "Free Nelson Mandela". Dammers then dissolved the band. "Free Nelson Mandela" had a role in the downfall of apartheid, as it raised awareness of the issue, and became an anthem of the anti-apartheid movement in South Africa. The Guardian referred to it as "one of the most effective protest songs in history."

Dammers at times attempted to rejoin the re-formed Specials, but in 2008 he stated that things had not worked out, and his attempts were not welcome.

=== 2 Tone Records ===
Dammers founded 2 Tone Records, as a ska version of the Motown label, the main label that kick started the ska revival of the late 1970s/1980s. Dammers got graphic artists to produce specific art for the label, including the iconic man in the suit graphic, which was based on a photo of reggae musician Peter Tosh. The label was a sub-label of Chrysalis Records, but still independent. The era saw a lot of racism, and 2 Tone Records was a bulwark against that, celebrating racial unity and combating the rise of the National Front. The whole two-tone scene took off, and the label released early singles that would end up becoming major hits for bands including Madness, the Beat and the Selecter. The Selecter left the label, and Dammers strayed from the ska influence to bring jazz influences, most particularly on the album More Specials However, by 1984 the Special AKA were the main artist on the label, and Dammers was the only original member left. Dammers almost destroyed the label through the cost of the release of the Special AKA album, but was saved when "Free Nelson Mandela" became huge internationally. He got into a lot of debt, and towards the end of the label he had to stop recording because of a lack of funds. Dammers finally shut down the label in 1985, seven years after it was founded, though the message of racial unity imparted to its many followers had a positive effect on society.

Dammers' founding of 2 Tone Records, which launched Madness, the Specials, the Bodysnatchers, the Beat and the Selecter among others, his push for the punk ska cross genre of music that the Specials had played, and his suggestions for the adoption of retro 1960s mod/rude boy clothes were a key element in starting the ska revival of the late 1970s and the two tone ska/punk sound specifically.

=== After Two Tone ===
In 1985, in the wake of the Band Aid single, Dammers organised the recording and release of the "Starvation" single, a version of the Pioneers' 1969 song, in aid of famine relief in Africa, featuring members of the Special AKA, UB40, Madness, the Pioneers, and the Beat.

In early 1986, Dammers took part in the Billy Bragg-fronted Red Wedge tour in support of the Labour Party, which also featured the Style Council, the Communards, and Junior Giscombe. Dammers became an anti-apartheid campaigner, helping to create the British wing of Artists Against Apartheid, which brought him into conflict with Paul Simon over his decision to record his album Graceland in South Africa. He also introduced Simple Minds to producer Tony Hollingsworth, and they became the first major act to agree to perform at the Anti-Apartheid Movement's Nelson Mandela 70th Birthday Tribute concert, which Hollingsworth was contracted to produce and was broadcast worldwide from London's Wembley Stadium on 11 June 1988. That same year, he briefly played with the re-formed Madness on their single "I Pronounce You" and its attendant album, The Madness.

=== Spatial AKA Orchestra ===
In 2006, Dammers started his new band, the Spatial AKA Orchestra, playing his own compositions and tributes to Sun Ra and other experimental jazz artists. The band generally features up to 20 musicians on stage, with Dammers asking various people to join, including established jazz musicians Zoe Rahman, Larry Stabbins and Denys Baptiste. They perform in elaborate Ancient Egyptian and outer space-themed costumes, and share the stage with bizarre props such as model alien heads and mummy sarcophagi. Trombonist Rico Rodriguez also featured in a number of shows. The band plays new material, as well as some of Dammers' Specials songs.

=== Work with other artists and solo work ===
In November 2006, Dammers was awarded an honorary degree from Coventry University, celebrating by DJing at the launch party of the Coventry branch of the Love Music Hate Racism organisation. In the same month, he attended a private viewing of a Harry Pye curated art exhibition in east London that featured paintings of bands and singers that had once been championed by the late BBC Radio 1 DJ John Peel. Dammers read out a four-page poem, in which he thanked Peel for helping his own band, and for supporting black musicians.

Carl Barât of the Libertines included a Dammers composition, "Too Much Too Young", on his personal compilation album Under the Influence. Pete Doherty, former member of the Libertines, namechecked "What I Like Most About You Is Your Girlfriend" on Down in Albion, the first Babyshambles album. The song "Merry Go Round" contains the lyrics "He says, 'What I like most about you, Pete/Is your girlfriend and your shoes.'" Those who have recorded songs written by Dammers include Tricky ("Ghost Town"), the Prodigy ("Ghost Town") and Elvis Costello ("What I Like Most About You Is Your Girlfriend").

Dammers has produced singles for Robert Wyatt, the Untouchables, UB40 and Junior Delgado. He contributed "Riot City" to the soundtrack of the Julien Temple film, Absolute Beginners, and "Brightlights" to the compilation album Jamming: A New Optimism.

Dammers still regularly DJs in English nightclubs.

=== Awards ===
Dammers has been recognised widely by his peers and music critics for his role in making ska music popular in the 1980s, his creation of ska/punk fusion, and for his role in race relations and the anti apartheid movement. Mojo referred to him as "The Ska Punk Wizard", while the Clash's lead singer, Joe Strummer, referred to him as the Tzar of Ska. GQ magazine referred to Dammers as the Paul McCartney/John Lennon of Ska.

Dammers has received a number of awards for his services to anti-apartheid/human rights and music:

- The South African Order of the Companions of O. R. Tambo in silver award, a national honour, for his role in the anti-apartheid movement (Dammers received the award in April 2014). "It feels fantastic. It is a real honour to be considered for this, especially when I compare what little I did to the work of those who sacrificed their lives, I am humbled," he said.
- Radio 1 DJ Award, for his work with 2 Tone Records and the Specials (1979)
- Honorary doctorate from Sheffield Hallam University. (November 2015)
- Q magazine's Q Merit Award at London's Park Lane Hotel. (October 2000)
- Ivor Novello Inspiration Award (May 2014)

== Solo discography ==
- "Riot City" (8:29) – on Absolute Beginners (Songs from the Original Motion Picture) (LP, Virgin V-2386, 1986)
- "Solitary Tower" (3:50) – on Monsterism Night (CD, Lo Editions LOCD-22, 2009)
- "Free Nelson Mandela" (with Simple Minds) – on Nelson Mandela 70th Birthday Tribute (VHS/Secam, CMV Enterprises 49011, 1989)
