= Acanthospermum humile =

Scientific classification
- Kingdom: Plantae
- Clade: Tracheophytes
- Clade: Angiosperms
- Clade: Eudicots
- Clade: Asterids
- Order: Asterales
- Family: Asteraceae
- Genus: Acanthospermum
- Species: A. humile

Binomial name
- Acanthospermum humile (Sw.) DC.

Synonyms
- Centrospermum humile (Sw.) Less.; Melampodium humile Sw.

Species of flowering plant

Acanthospermum humile is a species of plants in the family Asteraceae. It is native to the West Indies but naturalized in parts of South America, Central America, and North America.
