= Zoe Rahman =

English jazz composer and pianist (born 1971)

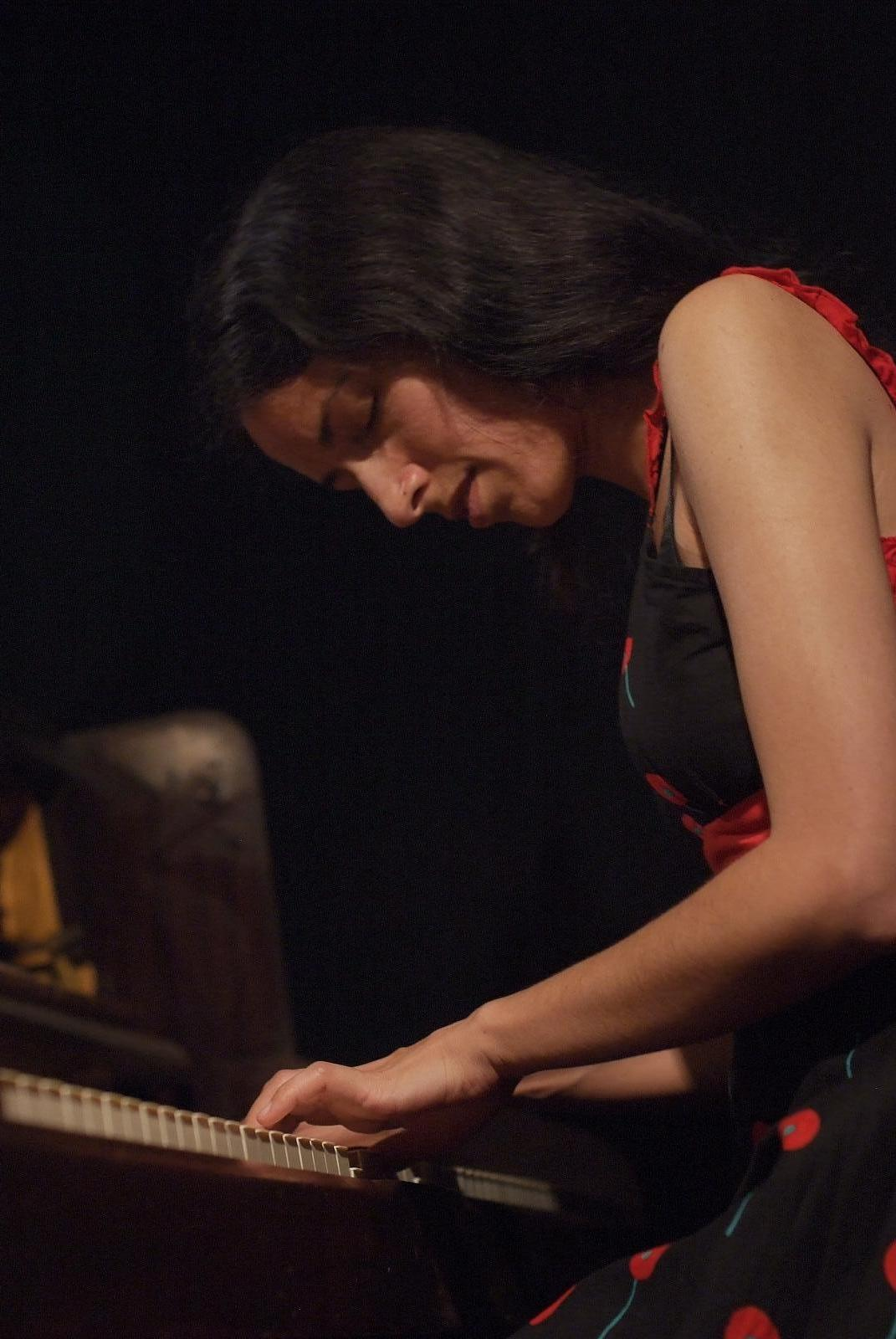
- Rahman performing in June 2008

Background information
- Born: 20 January 1971 (age 55); Chichester, West Sussex, England
- Genre: Jazz
- Occupations: Musician; composer
- Instruments: Piano; harmonium
- Years active: 1998–present
- Label: Manushi
- Website: zoerahman.com

Zoe Rahman (born 20 January 1971) is an English jazz composer and pianist.

== Early life ==
Rahman was born and brought up in Chichester, West Sussex, England, by a Bengali father, Mizan Rahman, and an English-Irish mother. Her mother was a doctor who grew up in New Zealand. Rahman describes her childhood as being "completely English" and has described herself as culturally "very English". Her father's family is from Dhaka. Her maternal grandmother is from Ireland.

Rahman started off playing classical piano when she was about four years old. Her family had a piano that her parents had bought for £10 and Rahman's older sister started to play; her other two siblings and Rahman followed her footsteps. Rahman and her younger brother, Idris, got into listening to jazz when they were teenagers and tried to work out how to play. Rahman had jazz piano lessons with various teachers and found opportunities to gig with other musicians.

She studied classical piano at the Royal Academy of Music, received a music degree at St Hugh's College, University of Oxford, and won a scholarship to study jazz performance at Berklee College of Music in Boston, where she had lessons with pianist Joanne Brackeen. While in America she formed her own trio, which featured bassist Joshua Davis and drummer Bob Moses.

In 2002, Rahman discovered Bengali music, when her father was hospitalised and she had transferred some of his cassette tapes of 1950s Bengali music to CDs for him to listen to while he recuperated. Rahman became intrigued by the sounds and subsequent trips to Bangladesh allowed Rahman to learn about her background through music.

== Later life and career ==
=== Radio and television appearances ===
Rahman has been the featured artist on radio and television programmes such as Courtney Pine's Jazz Crusade on BBC Radio 2, BBC Radio 4's Woman's Hour, BBC London's Now's the Time, Andrea Oliver's The Selector, Northern Broadcasting Internet Radio, Resonance FM and Julian Joseph's Jazz series for Meridian Television. She has performed live on the BBC World Service and on BBC Radio 3's In Tune.

=== Recording and performances ===
In 2001, her debut album The Cynic was released. In July 2006, her second album Melting Pot was released. Melting Pot was nominated for the Mercury Music Prize Album of the Year and won Jazz Album of the Year at the Parliamentary Jazz Awards in 2006. In September 2008, her third album Where Rivers Meet was released. In May 2009, her fourth album Zoe Rahman Trio: Live was released. In January 2012, her fifth album Kindred Spirits was released. Kindred Spirits won the Best Jazz Act award at the 2012 MOBO Awards.

Rahman was sought out by music producer Paul Vlcek to play with George Mraz. In July 2013, their album Unison was released. Rahman's first solo piano album, Dreamland, was recorded in 2015 and released by Manushi.

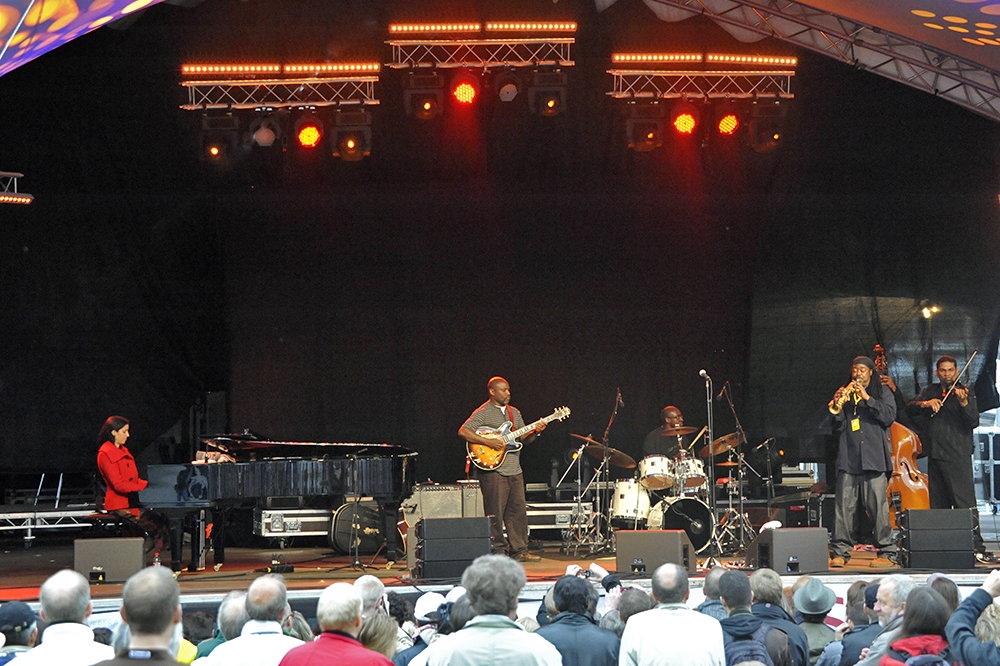
Zoe Rahman with the ensemble of Courtney Pine on stage at the Stockholm Jazz Festival 2010.

Aside from working with her own groups, Rahman continues to perform and record (both in the UK and internationally) with a diverse range of other artists. These have included: Courtney Pine; Clark Tracey's New Quintet; Soothsayers; Jerry Dammers' Spatial AKA Orchestra; Keziah Jones (2003/2004 European tours); David Walcott (2003 Festival, Barbados); Mekaal Hasan (2001 tour, Pakistan). She co-wrote a jazz-based theatre show, I'm a Fool to Want You, about the French writer/musician Boris Vian, with Told by an Idiot Theatre Company (UK / South American tours 2003–2005).

Other albums or DVDs that she has appeared on include: Courtney Pine's Song (The Ballad Book) and Europa; Reem Kelani's Sprinting Gazelle; the Clark Tracey Quintet's The Calling and The Mighty Sa; Tony Bianco's In a Western Sense; Gary Boyle's Games; Soothsayers' Tangled Roots; Brigitte Escobar's Brigitte; Terry Hall/Mushtaq's The Hour of Two Lights; Cevanne Horrocks-Hopayian's Big Ears; and Keziah Jones's Live at the Élysée Montmartre DVD.

=== Composer ===
Rahman composed the piano score for the 2020 touring production of The Strange Tale of Charlie Chaplin and Stan Laurel.

=== Tours ===
Rahman has toured extensively throughout the UK and internationally, including North Sea Jazz Festival, Molde Jazz Festival, Palermo Jazz Festival, Algeria's European Cultural Festival, Cork Jazz Festival, Estonia's Nargen Festival, Barbados Jazz Festival and Rochester International Jazz Festival.

From 2009 to 2012, Rahman toured with Jerry Dammers' The Spatial AKA Orchestra, bringing Sun Ra to a new audience. She also worked with bands led by bassist Danny Thompson, exploring the legacy of songwriter Nick Drake; singer Martha Wainwright; and saxophonist Courtney Pine.

=== Personal life ===
Rahman has a son, who was born in 2014.

== Reception ==
Rahman has been described in The Observer as "one of the finest young pianists in Europe" and "a remarkable pianist by any standard".

== Awards and nominations ==
Year	Work	Award	Category	Result
1999		Perrier Young Jazz Award	Young Jazz Musician of the Year	Won
2001	The Cynic	BBC Radio 3	Jazz Album of the Year Review	Shortlisted
2001		BBC Jazz Awards	Rising Star	Nominated
2006	Melting Pot	Mercury Music Prize	Album of the Year	Nominated
2006	Melting Pot	Parliamentary Jazz Awards	Jazz Album of the Year	Won
2012	Kindred Spirits	MOBO Awards	Best Jazz Act	Won
2021		Ivor Novello Awards	Impact Award	Won

== Discography ==
An asterisk (*) indicates that the year is that of release.

=== As leader/co-leader ===
Year recorded	Title	Label	Notes
2001*	The Cynic	Manushi	Trio, with Jeremy Brown (bass), Winston Clifford (drums)
2006*	Melting Pot	Manushi	Trio, most tracks with Oli Hayhurst (bass), Gene Calderazzo (drums); one track with Jeremy Brown (bass), Pat Illingworth (drums); one track with Idris Rahman (clarinet), Adriano Adewale Itaúna (udu)
2007	Zoe Rahman Trio: Live	Manushi	Most tracks trio, with Oli Hayhurst (bass), Gene Calderazzo (drums); two tracks quartet, with Idris Rahman (clarinet) added; in concert; released 2009
2007	Where Rivers Meet	Manushi	Co-led with Idris Rahman (clarinet); most tracks also with Samy Bishai (violin), Oli Hayhurst (bass), Gene Calderazzo (drums), Kuljit Bhamra (tabla); some tracks with Arnob, Gaurob, Joseph Aquilina, Mizan Rahman (vocals) added; released 2008
2011	Kindred Spirits	Manushi	Some tracks trio, with Oli Hayhurst (bass), Gene Calderazzo (drums); some tracks quartet, with Idris Rahman (clarinet, bass clarinet) or Courtney Pine (alto flute) added; released 2012
2013*	Unison	Cube-Metier	Duo, co-led with George Mraz (bass)
2015	Dreamland	Manushi	Solo piano
2023	Colour of Sound	Manushi	With Alex Ridout and Byron Wallen (trumpet), Rosie Turton (trombone), Idris Rahman (tenor sax, alto sax, clarinet), Rowland Sutherland (flute), Alec Dankworth (bass), Gene Caldarazzo (drums)
2025	Hull Suite Live	Manushi	Trio, with Alec Dankworth (bass), Gene Caldarazzo (drums); in concert

== See also ==
- British Bangladeshi
- List of British Bangladeshis
