= The Cynic (album) =

Studio album by Zoe Rahman
- Released: 16 November 2001
- Genre: Jazz
- Length: 36:05
- Label: Manushi Records

Zoe Rahman chronology
| The Cynic (2001) | Melting Pot (2006) |

The Cynic is the debut studio album by English jazz composer Zoe Rahman, released in 2001 by Manushi Records.

== Critical response ==
Professional ratings
Review scores
| Source | Rating |
|---|---|
| The Penguin Guide to Jazz Recordings | 3/4 stars |

John Fordham of The Guardian said The Cynic "alerted audiences to her [Rahman's] independent musical life..." Michael Tucker of Jazz Journal said, "Never was an album more misleadingly titled..."

== Track listing ==
| No. | Title | Length |
|---|---|---|
| 1. | "October" | 6:27 |
| 2. | "Apple Pie" | 5:48 |
| 3. | "Monica" | 5:13 |
| 4. | "The Cynic" | 5:01 |
| 5. | "Zen" | 0:57 |
| 6. | "The Lady Lies" | 6:34 |
| 7. | "Never Enough" | 6:05 |
| Total length: | | 36:05 |

== Personnel ==
Musicians

- Zoe Rahman – piano
- Winston Clifford – drums
- Jeremy Brown – bass

== Awards and nominations ==
| Year | Award | Category | Result |
|---|---|---|---|
| 2001 | BBC Radio 3 | Jazz Album of the Year Review | Shortlisted |
| 2001 | BBC Jazz Awards | Rising Star | Nominated |
