= Ben Davis (cellist) =

British jazz cellist

Ben Davis is a cellist from the United Kingdom known for his improvisation. His group Basquiat Strings was nominated for the Mercury Prize in 2007. He is a member of the F-IRE Collective. He works at the Crowden school of music in Berkeley, California.

His group, Basquiat Strings, originated as a standard string quartet (two violins, a viola and a cello). Only later did cellist Davis decide to add double bass and drums "to strengthen the rhythmic accompaniment". Basquiat Strings were nominated for the 2007 Mercury Prize. The band performed an Electric Prom in 2008 featuring NY sax player Elery Eskerlin.

Davis studied at the Guildhall School of Music and Drama and later at the Banff School of Fine Arts with Dave Holland.

He has since pursued a varied musical career encompassing classical, world, early music, jazz and experimental. He has performed with Ingrid Laubrock, Bobby McFerrin, Mary Halvorson, Simon Nabatov, Wadada Leo Smith, Tom Rainey, Tomeka Reid, Vincent Courtois, Django Bates, Chris Biscoe, Liam Noble, Stuart Hall, Hassan Erraji, Mulatu Astatke, Joglaresa, The Dufay Collective, Evan Parker, Christine Tobin, Steve Buckley, Huw Warren, Jason Yarde, Julian Joseph, and the Stavanger Symphony Orchestra. Davis moved to the Chicago USA in 2016 where he formed a trio with guitarist Sam Mosching and drummer Steve Hunt and a duo with guitarist Matt Gold.

== Influences ==
Alongside the jazz and the classical influences, there are also folk elements including Macedonian tapan rhythms and Hungarian processional marches.

== Discography ==
=== Albums as a leader ===
- The Ben Davis Group (with Paul Clarvis and Chris Biscoe)
- Basquiat Strings (with Seb Rochford) - Basquiat Strings
- Basquiat Strings - Part Two
- Courtship - Ben Davis Solo Cello

=== Albums as a sideman ===
- Forensic - Ingrid Laubrock
- Oriole - Song for the Sleeping
- Oriole - Migration
- Oriole - Every New Day
- Julia Biel - Not Alone
- Orbestra - Transdanubian Swineherds
- Joglaresa - Magdalena
- Clown Revisited - Flashes of a Normal World
- Butterfly Wing - Le Depart
- Fumi Okiji's Old Time Jazz Band - Old Fashion
- Alex Hutton Trio - songs From the Seven Hills
- Yurodny - Evenset
- Laura Jurd - Landing Ground
- Ingrid Laubrock Octet - Zurich Concert
- Zac Gvirtzman - Monk Spent Youth
- Simon Nabatov - String Trio
- Huw Warren - A Barrel Organ Far From Home
- Polar Bear - Polar Bear
