= Soothsayer =

Soothsayer may refer to:

- One practicing divination, including:
  - Fortune-telling
  - Haruspex
  - Oracle
  - Prophet
  - Precognition

== Music ==
- Soothsayers (band), a London-based Afrobeat and reggae group
- The Soothsayer, an album by Wayne Shorter, 1979
- "Soothsayer", a song by Amorphis from The Beginning of Times, 2011
- "Soothsayer", a song by Buckethead from Crime Slunk Scene, 2006
- "Soothsayer", a song by Hallucinogen, 1995
- "Soothsayer", a song by the Mars Volta from The Bedlam in Goliath, 2008
- "Soothsayer", a song by Of Monsters and Men from Fever Dream, 2019

== Other uses ==
- Soothsayer (horse) (1808–1827), a British Thoroughbred racehorse and sire
- Soothsayer (moth) or Graphiphora augur, a moth in the family Noctuidae
- Soothsayer, a 1991 science-fiction novel by Mike Resnick
