= Finn Peters =

British lautist and saxophonist

Finn Peters is a flautist and saxophonist.

"After the best part of a decade immersed in dance, hip hop, Afro-Cuban, electronica and contemporary classical musics, flautist and saxophonist Finn Peters returned to his jazz roots with Su-Ling (Babel, 2006)." This was followed by Butterflies, which added "strings, a Balinese gamelan ensemble, kora, synths, a few choruses of birdsong and some inventive sound processing".

The Finn Peters Quintet (or 'Finntet') won the best jazz group category of the BBC Jazz Awards in 2007. His Music of the Mind album "explores the possibilities of music coupling regular ensemble playing to computer sounds generated by directly tapping brainwaves". He has played with Dizzee Rascal and Matthew Herbert.

== Discography ==
- Dr Seus EPs 1 and 2, (Mantella 2002)
- Bansuri, (Traficante, 2005)
- Suling, (Babel, 2006)
- Butterflies, (Accidental, 2008)
- Music of the Mind, (Mantella, 2010)
- Purple and Yellow, (Mantella, 2011)
- Red, Green and Blue, (Mantella, 2024)
