= Nick Ramm =

English jazz pianist and composer

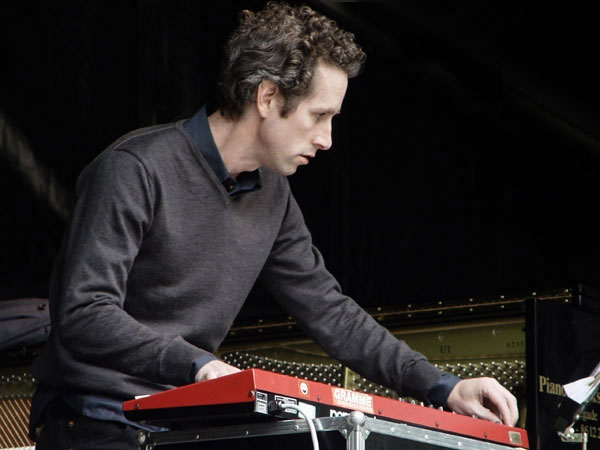
2011 Aarhus Jazz Festival

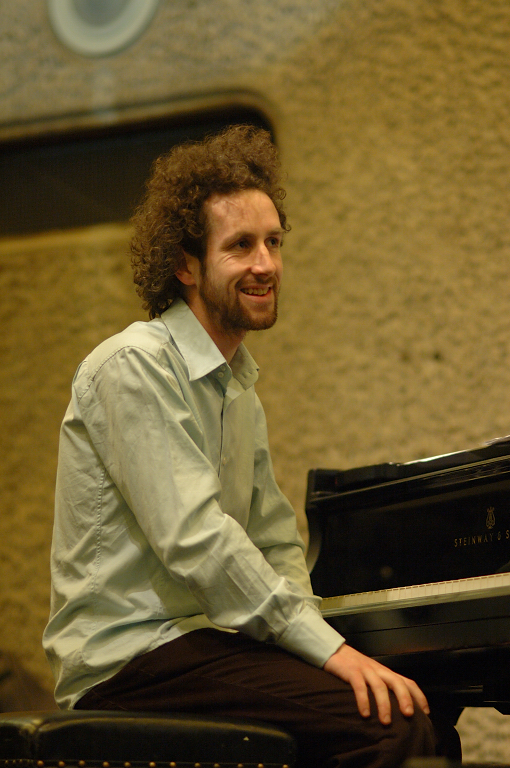
Ramm in 2005

Nick Ramm is an English, London-based, pianist and composer.

In 2005, he released his first album, Flashes of a Normal World, with his own band Clown Revisited. The bands he has been involved with in include The Cinematic Orchestra, Finn Peters' Finntet, Fulborn Teversham and the BBC Big Band.

== Discography ==
- Clown Revisited (2006, F-IRE Collective)
- Off The Cut (2006, w/Zhenya Strigalev)
- Ma Fleur by The Cinematic Orchestra (2007, Ninja Tune)
- Touchy by Clare Hirst (2008)
- Live at the Royal Albert Hall by The Cinematic Orchestra (2008, Ninja Tune)
- London Brew (2023, as part of London Brew)
