= Basquiat Strings =

British chamber jazz quintet

Basquiat Strings is a British chamber jazz quintet led by the cellist Ben Davis, who composes all the music. It features an innovative line-up which hybridises the classical string quartet (two violins, viola and cello) with the jazz rhythm section (double bass and drums).

Classically trained but having grown up alongside non-classical musicians, they have developed a unique sound which has earned them many fans. In February 2007, the quintet released their first album, put together with the drummer Seb Rochford. The album, entitled simply Basquiat Strings with Seb Rochford, was one of the 2007 Mercury Prize nominees.

== Reviews ==
- The Guardian newspaper Arts section, Friday February 23, 2007
- BBC Review of Basquiat Strings
