= Idris Rahman =

English clarinettist, saxophonist and record producer

- Born: 16 July 1976 (age 50); Chichester, West Sussex, England
- Origin: London, England
- Genres: Reggae; Afrobeat; Jazz
- Occupations: Clarinettist; saxophonist; flutist; record producer
- Instruments: Clarinet; saxophone
- Formerly of: Oriole

Idris Rahman (born 16 July 1976) is an English clarinettist, saxophonist and record producer.

== Early life ==
Rahman was born and brought up in Chichester, West Sussex, England by a Bengali father, Mizan Rahman, and an English-Irish mother. His mother was a doctor who grew up in New Zealand. His maternal grandmother is from Ireland.

== Career ==
Idris Rahman is a London-based saxophonist, clarinettist, singer, bass-player, composer and producer. He has co-led the band Soothsayers for nearly two decades and has co-written and co-produced their seven critically acclaimed albums, the most recent released on label Wah Wah 45s. Soothsayers have played at most major UK festivals and have toured widely throughout Europe and beyond.

Rahman has performed and recorded with a whole range of artists including Anoushka Shankar, Shayan Chowdhury Arnob, Arun Ghosh, Julia Biel, Osibisa, Ayub Ogada, Oriole, Dodgy as well as with his sister Zoe Rahman, with whom he has toured and recorded extensively.

Rahman is involved in a number of other jazz-centric projects as a performer/composer - Wildflower and Ill Considered have garnered a lot of attention since their beginnings in 2016/17. Wildflower's first album was nominated in Gilles Peterson's Worldwide Awards for Jazz Album of the Year 2018, and Ill Considered have toured extensively throughout the UK and Europe since 2018. They have released 11 albums from September 2017 to March 2020, including a Christmas album.

As well as performing regularly, Rahman has a studio in South London where he has produced and mixed many albums, racking up a catalogue including two Mercury-nominated albums that he mixed - Melting Pot by Zoe Rahman and Basquiat Strings' debut album - and MOBO-nominated album Love Letters and Other Missiles by Julia Biel which he produced. He has written and produced music for television and film, and is currently working on music for a feature film to be released in 2020/21.

Rahman studied music at Oxford University and has been a teacher and workshop leader for over twenty years, working in schools, colleges and universities, teaching instrumental lessons, composition and song writing. He is a co-founder of Brixton-based youth group Youthsayers, who have rehearsed and performed regularly since May 2016.

"Idris’s unimpeachable tone and centred ideas make an essential contribution to what could well be seen in the future as one of the best British jazz albums of this period.” (Jazzwise)

"Hauntingly beautiful clarinet playing" (bbc.co.uk music reviews)

"Rahman is a revelation - a saxophonist of fascinating creative resource, capable of both raw power and involved delicacy" (The Wire)

== Personal life ==
Rahman is in a relationship with singer Julia Biel.

== See also ==
- British Bangladeshi
- List of British Bangladeshis
