= Weather report =

Weather report may refer to:

- Weather forecasting, the application of science and technology to predict the weather
- Weather Report, an American jazz fusion musical group and two namesake studio albums:
  - Weather Report (1971 album)
  - Weather Report (1982 album)
- Weather Report, a 2003 album by Chris Watson
- "Weather Report", a song by Scandal from the 2013 album Standard
- "Weather Report", a song by Fishmans from the 1997 album Uchū Nippon Setagaya
- "Weather Report", a speaking recording by Raffi from his 1995 album Raffi Radio
- Weather Report, a fictional character and Stand of the same name from JoJo's Bizarre Adventure: Stone Ocean
