= Death to the Planet =

EP by the Comet Is Coming
- Released: 22 April 2017
- Genres: Nu jazz, electronic rock, jazz fusion
- Label: The Leaf Label
- Producer: Dan Leavers

The Comet Is Coming chronology
Channel the Spirits (2016)	Death to the Planet (2017)	Trust in the Lifeforce of the Deep Mystery (2019)

Death to the Planet is an EP by British jazz/electronica trio the Comet Is Coming. It was released by The Leaf Label as part of Record Store Day 2017.

== Background ==
Death to the Planet is the third release by the London-based group. It follows their initial EP, Prophecy (2015), and their Mercury Prize nominated debut album Channel the Spirits (2016). It was released on limited edition orange vinyl for Record Store Day, with a subsequent release on black vinyl. The EP was described by Record Store Day as "the sound of total planetary destruction, produced with laser-guided accuracy and aimed directly at the dancefloor" and by The Leaf Label as "[documenting] a collaborative approach to composition through spontaneous improvisation". The record was re-released as a limited edition of 500 by Rough Trade Records in July 2018.

== Track listing ==
No.	Title	Length
1.	"Start Running"	6:32
2.	"Final Eclipse"	6:45
3.	"March of the Rising Sun"	8:10
4.	"Ascension"	3:34

== Personnel ==
- King Shabaka – tenor saxophone
- Danalogue The Conqueror – keys
- Betamax Killer – drums
