= The Sick Man of Europe (musical artist) =

British musician

- Origin: London, United Kingdom
- Genres: Electronic music, Post-punk, Art rock, Krautrock
- Years active: 2025–present
- Label: The Leaf Label

The Sick Man of Europe is a musical artist from London whose work draws on post-punk, Krautrock and art rock. They released the Moderate Air Quality EP on The Leaf Label on 12 February 2025 and their eponymous album on 20 June 2025.

Their music has been praised for its "minimalist electronic structure" and "alternative sounding machine-driven electronic[s]". Recent live shows supporting fellow Leaf Label artists Snapped Ankles were described as "[pushing] the parameters of post-punk ... with a barrage of groove-ridden rhythms".

Reviews for the album The Sick Man of Europe include praise for its "propulsive motorik drum machines, languid basslines and pulsing sequencers", "terse, potent anti-rock", "ephemeral electricity" and "ubiquitous dread". Rough Trade noted the influence of Bauhaus, Joy Division, Neu!, Suicide and Swans and When The Horn Blows called the album "a state of the nation commentary in every sense of the word".

== Discography ==
=== Studio albums ===
- The Sick Man of Europe (2025)
- The Intermittent Signal (2026)

=== EPs ===
- Moderate Air Quality (2025)

=== Singles ===
- "Obsolete" (2025)
- "Transactional" (2025)
- "Profane Not Profound" (2025)
