= Jun Ray Song Chang =

Compilation album by Asa-Chang & Junray
- Released: September 17, 2002
- Genre: Experimental; electronic
- Length: 38:34
- Label: The Leaf Label
- Producer: Asa Chang

Asa-Chang & Junray chronology
| Hana (2001) | Jun Ray Song Chang (2002) | Tsu Gi Ne Pu (2003) |

Professional ratings
Review scores
| Source | Rating |
|---|---|
| AllMusic | 2.5/5 stars |
| BBC Music | (positive) |
| Pitchfork | 8.0/10 |

Jun Ray Song Chang is the third album and first compilation by experimental band Asa-Chang & Junray, released through The Leaf Label on September 17, 2002. It compiles their second album and most of their first one alongside two new tracks.

== Track listing ==
| No. | Title | Length |
|---|---|---|
| 1. | "Hana" | 6:43 |
| 2. | "Preach" | 4:06 |
| 3. | "Kobana" | 4:31 |
| 4. | "Nigatsu" | 5:47 |
| 5. | "Goo-Gung-Gung" | 2:04 |
| 6. | "Kutsu #02" | 1:01 |
| 7. | "Jippun" | 9:33 |
| 8. | "Kokoni Sachiari" | 3:34 |
| 9. | "Tabla Bol (Catastrophe)" | 2:25 |
| 10. | "Radio-No-Youni (Comme a la Radio)" | 6:30 |
| 11. | "Kutsu" | 2:03 |
| Total length: | | 48:07 |

== Personnel ==
- Asa-Chang - string arrangements, bongos, producing, trumpets, vocals
- Shoukichi Kina - composing
- Kiyoshi Kusaka - engineering, mixing, programming
- Kazufumi Kodama - percussion, programming
- Hidehiko Urayama - guitars, programming
- Yoshimi P We - programming
