= New Hymn to Freedom =

Studio album by Szun Waves
- Released: 31 August 2018
- Length: 44:42
- Label: The Leaf

Szun Waves chronology
At Sacred Walls (2016)	New Hymn to Freedom (2018)

Professional ratings
Aggregate scores
Source	Rating
Metacritic	83/100
Review scores
Source	Rating
AllMusic	3.5/5 stars
Drowned in Sound	9/10
Pitchfork	7.2/10
The Line of Best Fit	8.5/10

New Hymn to Freedom is the second studio album by British band Szun Waves. It was released on 31 August 2018 through The Leaf Label.

== Accolades ==
Publication	Accolade	Rank	Ref.
Gigwise	Top 51 Albums of 2018	47	
Loud and Quiet	Top 40 Albums of 2018	29	
The Quietus	Top 100 Albums of 2018	39	

== Track listing ==
No.	Title	Length
1.	"Constellation"	5:38
2.	"Fall into Water"	6:51
3.	"High Szun"	7:05
4.	"Temple"	6:52
5.	"Moon Runes"	5:59
6.	"New Hymn to Freedom"	12:17
