= Heartcore =

Heartcore may refer to:

- Heartcore (Kurt Rosenwinkel album), 2003
- Heartcore (Wildbirds & Peacedrums album), 2007
- Heartcore (Au/Ra album), 2026
