= Luke Abbott =

English electronic music producer

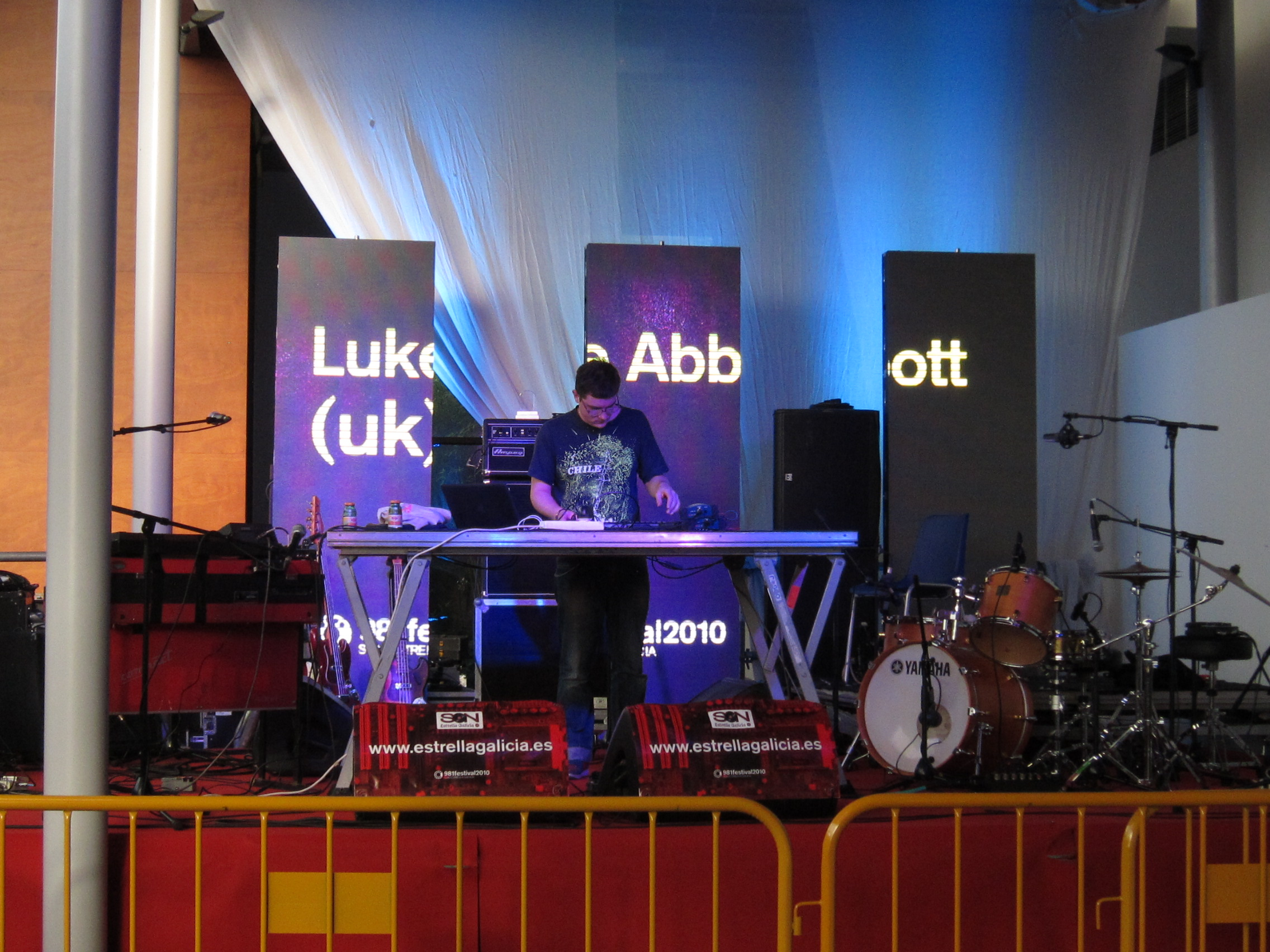
Luke Abbott during a concert in 2010

Luke Abbott is an English electronic music producer from Norwich, Norfolk. He records and performs extensively under his own name, under the alias Earlham Mystics, and as one-third of the electronic jazz group Szun Waves. His work has been described as "left-field techno and kraut-infused electro" but also draws on more esoteric elements of improvisation, "psychedelic, filtered beats and slow-evolving synths".

Abbott's first single, 'B'B'B'B'B'B'B'B'B'B'B'B'B'B'B'B' was released by Output Recordings in 2006 and later that year, his 'Projections' single was released as a limited-edition 7" on Trash Aesthetics. In 2008, the Tuesday EP was released on James Holden's Border Community label, beginning a long relationship spanning several releases including 2009's Whitebox Stereo EP, 2011's Holkham Drones and 2014's Wysing Forest. The latter was created from a series of improvisations made in 2012 when Abbott was in residence at Wysing Arts Centre and produced a site-specific composition which is now in the grounds of the art venue. The album "presents pristine calm washes, deeply unsettling throbs and blasts of strident noise" and can be seen as a return to the "youthful art school indoctrination" of his time studying electroacoustic composition at the University of East Anglia in Norwich.

In 2012, he also released two EPs (Object Is A Navigator and Modern Driveway) on Gold Panda's label, NOTOWN Recordings. Following these releases he co-produced and mixed Gold Panda's final album, Good Luck And Do Your Best in 2016.

Translate, Abbott's first solo album in six years, was released on Border Community on 30 October 2020. The album was born out of a process of personal psychological re-evaluation and the rediscovery of Abbott's own solo music-making practice. The first single 'Kagen Sound' was released on 12 August 2020 and described by Abbott as sounding 'like a huge opening in the earth [and] like a cosmic doorway. Loud And Quiet described the album as "meditative, vital, and expertly crafted electronic music".

During his six-year sabbatical from solo recording, Abbott focused on mix and remix work, a new more dancefloor-directed alias Earlham Mystics and a productive new sideline in film, with two solo soundtracks to his name to date. His "evocative, atmospheric synthscapes" for film The Goob went on to win Abbott the award for 'Best Music' at the Stockholm Film Festival, before being released under the title Music For A Flat Landscape.

Abbott is also one third of Szun Waves alongside British saxophonist Jack Wyllie (Portico Quartet) and Australian drummer Laurence Pike (Triosk, PVT). Their second album New Hymn To Freedom was described by The Quietus as "a beautifully crafted, exploratory piece of work".

== Discography ==
As Luke Abbott

- 2006: "b,b,b,b,b,b,b,b,b,b,b,b,b,b,b,b" / "Buckinghamshire's Rubbish, Let's Go Home" (Output)
- 2006: "(Prelude) We've Lost the War" / "At Pace" (Output)
- 2006: Repus Tekram (Trash Aethetic)
- 2008: Tuesday EP (Border Community)
- 2009: Whitebox Stereo (Border Community)
- 2010: Trans Forest Alignment (Border Community)
- 2010: Holkham Drones (Border Community)
- 2011: Brazil (Border Community)
- 2012: Modern Driveway (Notown)
- 2012: Object is a Navigator (Notown)
- 2014: Wysing Forest (Border Community)
- 2015: Music For A Flat Landscape (Buffalo Temple)
- 2019: Music From The Edge Of An Island (Float)
- 2020: Translate (Border Community)

As Earlham Mystics

- 2017: Truth EP (Notown)
- 2017: Waters EP (Notown)

With Szun Waves

- 2016: At Sacred Walls (Buffalo Temple)
- 2018: New Hymn To Freedom (The Leaf Label)
- 2020: Three EP (The Leaf Label)

With Jack Wyllie

- 2015: Luke Abbott and Jack Wyllie (Buffalo Temple)

Remixes as Luke Abbott

- 2009: Micromattic - "Under Over The Clouds" (Absolutive)
- 2009: Mit - "Rauch" (Half Machine)
- 2009: The MFA - "Throw Is Back (We Will Destroy You)" (Border Community)
- 2009: John Talabot - "Sunshine" (Hivern Discs)
- 2010: Hanssen - "Airplaning" (Innerflight)
- 2010: Dan Deacon - "Surprise Stefani" (Amazing Sounds)
- 2011: Ghianda - "Apricots" (Technowagon)
- 2011: Crimea X - "Plov" (Hell Yeah)
- 2011: Andy Muller - "Comedown" (Trouw)
- 2011: Transept - "Leopard Slug Love Song" (Transept)
- 2011: Esperanza feat. Banjo or Freakout - "Sirena" (Gomma)
- 2013: Jon Hopkins - "Open Eye Signal" (Domino)
- 2013: PVT - "Vertigo" (Felte)
- 2013: Portico Quartet - "Rubidium" (Real World)
- 2013: Nils Frahm - "For" (Erased Tapes
- 2014: Simian Ghost - "Echoes Of Songs" (Playground)
- 2014: East India Youth - "Dripping Down" (Pias)
- 2014: James Yorkston - "Feathers Are Falling" (Domino)
- 2016: Todd Terje - "Snooze 4 Love" (Olsen)
- 2017: Dead Light - "Falling In" (Village Green)
- 2017: Randweg - "Ball" (Funken)
- 2018: Ride - "Cali" (Witchita)
- 2018: Hookworms - Ulswater (Domino)
- 2019: Laurence Pike - "Drum Chant" (The Leaf Label)
- 2020: Will Samson - "Triplet" (Witchita)

Remixes as Earlham Mystics

- 2018: George Fitzgerald - "Roll Back" (Domino)
- 2018: James Zabiela - "Vines"
