= Stunning Luxury =

Studio album by Snapped Ankles
- Released: 1 March 2019
- Length: 44:11
- Label: The Leaf Label

Snapped Ankles chronology
Come Play the Trees (2017)	Stunning Luxury (2019)

Professional ratings
Aggregate scores
Source	Rating
Metacritic	72/100
Review scores
Source	Rating
AllMusic	3/5 stars
DIY	4/5 stars
The Line of Best Fit	8/10

Stunning Luxury is the second studio album by English band Snapped Ankles. It was released on 1 March 2019 under The Leaf Label. Described as a "10-song Gang of Four style takedown of modern capitalism" and "a stridently political album that loses neither its sense of humour nor its capacity for bangers", the album's themes and settings are based in the city and suburbs rather than the forests of 2017's Come Play The Trees.

The Quietus placed the album at #16 in their Albums Of The Year 2019.

== Track listing ==
No.	Title	Length
1.	"Pestisound (Moving Out)"	3:55
2.	"Tailpipe"	4:23
3.	"Letter From Hampi Mountain"	4:14
4.	"Rechargeable"	5:17
5.	"Delivery Van"	4:04
6.	"Three Steps to a Development"	4:54
7.	"Skirmish in the Suburbs"	4:59
8.	"Dial the Rings on a Tree"	4:56
9.	"Drink and Glide"	4:09
10.	"Dream and Formaldehyde"	3:20
