= Long Season =

Studio album by Fishmans
- Released: October 25, 1996
- Recorded: July 1996
- Studios: Vivid Sound; Hawaii Studio Ver2.1; Little Bach
- Genres: Neo-psychedelia; dream pop; progressive pop; dub; post-rock; ambient pop
- Length: 35:16
- Label: Polydor
- Producers: Fishmans; ZAK

Fishmans chronology
Kūchū Camp (1996)	Long Season (1996)	Uchu Nippon Setagaya (1997)

Long Season (subtitled ...we are not four seasons) is the sixth studio album by Japanese band Fishmans, released on October 25, 1996 in Japan through Polydor Records. Regarded as a landmark of Japanese rock music, it consists of a single 35-minute composition based on the band's earlier single "Season".

== Background ==
The idea for Long Season originated on tour in 1996. While chatting amongst themselves, someone suggested, "Wouldn't it be fun to make a song that never ends?" This idea led to multiple recording sessions from July to August 1996, during which the band developed the album's singular composition, "Long Season". They built upon their earlier work, "Season", which was released in September 1996. The demo that Sato initially brought to the group was "Backbeat ni Nokkate".

Collaborating with co-producer ZAK at their studio, Waikiki Beach, Fishmans refined their ideas, with ZAK occasionally experiencing eye strain due to prolonged screen time, humorously referred to as "shedding blood from his eyes".

Fishmans collaborated with several guest musicians for the recording of Long Season. Notably, support member Honzi contributed keyboards and violin to the album. J-pop singer MariMari, who maintained a continued association with Fishmans in subsequent years, also lent her talents to the project. Michio "Darts" Sekiguchi served as guest guitarist, a role he fulfilled until the band's final concert. Singer UA provided vocals. Additionally, Asa-Chang contributed an extended improvised tabla passage, accompanied by various percussive elements, further enhancing the album's sonic texture.

== Reception ==
Professional ratings
Review scores
Source	Rating
AllMusic	4.5/5 stars
Pitchfork	9.3/10

The album initially achieved modest success within the Japanese alternative scene but remained relatively obscure internationally until the 2010s. It has received acclaim from critics and online music circles since then, with Paste ranking it as the seventh-greatest album of all time in 2024. Notably, Fishmans performed Long Season as one piece during their final live shows in December 1998. A recording of one of these performances was later included on the album 98.12.28 Otokotachi no Wakare (98.12.28 男達の別れ), further cementing the album's legacy.

== Track listing ==
The album comprises a single 35-minute composition, which has been divided into five parts across multiple releases.

All tracks are written by Shinji Sato.

Original Digipak CD
No.	Title	Length
1.	"Long Season" (part 1)	8:43
2.	"Long Season" (part 2)	5:24
3.	"Long Season" (part 3)	6:33
4.	"Long Season" (part 4)	4:47
5.	"Long Season" (part 5)	9:49
Total length:		35:16

2012 limited edition CD and streaming
No.	Title	Length
1.	"Long Season"	35:16
Total length:		35:16

2016 limited edition vinyl LP
No.	Title	Length
1.	"Long Season" (parts 1–3)	20:40
2.	"Long Season" (parts 4–5)	14:36
Total length:		35:16

== Personnel ==
Credits adapted from the album's liner notes.

- Fishmans – production, arrangement
- Shinji Sato – vocal, guitar, lyrics, composition
- Yuzuru Kashiwabara – bass
- Kin-ichi Motegi – drums
- Honzi – keyboards, violin, accordion, Organette20, chorus
- Michio "Darts" Sekiguchi – guitar, chorus
- Asa-Chang – percussion
- Taito Sato – guitar
- UA – chorus
- MariMari – chorus
- Masaki Morimoto – whistle
- Butchy – chorus
- Naoko Ohmiya – chorus
- Yoshiko Ohmiya – chorus
- ZAK – production, programming, recording, mixing
- TAK – recording
- Yuka Koizumi – mastering
- Ichiro Asatsuma – executive producer
- Yoshiyuki Okuda – executive producer
- Tadataka Watanabe – executive producer
- Phonic (Mooog & Mariko Yamamoto) – art direction, design
- Ayako Mogi – photography
- Crion Yamamoto – photography
- Junko Ishiwata – styling

== Charts ==
2016 reissue chart performance for Long Season
Chart (2016)	Peak position
Japanese Albums (Oricon)	100
