= Hard Times Furious Dancing =

Studio album by Snapped Ankles
- Released: 28 March 2025
- Length: 42:10
- Label: The Leaf Label

Snapped Ankles chronology
| Forest of Your Problems (2021) | Hard Times Furious Dancing (2025) |

Singles from Hard Times Furious Dancing
- 1. "Raoul" Released: 22 January 2025; 2. "Pay the Rent" Released: 20 February 2025

Hard Times Furious Dancing is the fifth studio album by London-based post-punk band Snapped Ankles. It was released on 28 March 2025 via The Leaf Label in LP, CD and digital formats. "Raoul" was released as the lead single on 22 January 2025. It was followed by the second single "Pay the Rent" on 20 February 2025.

== Reception ==
Professional ratings
Review scores
| Source | Rating |
|---|---|
| AllMusic | 4/5 stars |
| Beats Per Minute | 72% |
| Mojo | 3/5 stars |
| MusicOMH | 3.5/5 stars |
| Spectrum Culture | 75% |

AllMusic described the album as a "record addressing society's problems through the lens of dance music, tackling the cost-of-living crisis and corrupt world leaders with off-kilter electronic grooves." It was noted as "unfolding like a solid live set played at a party happening in the woods or at an abandoned warehouse" by Spectrum Culture, which gave it a rating score of 75%.

In a review for Beats Per Minute with a rating of 72%, Todd Dedman remarked, "Metronomic beats, oscillating synths, and saw-toothed bass lines are the pulse of the record." The album received a 3.5-star rating from MusicOMH, whose reviewer Donovan Livesey commented that it is "unlikely to win over anyone not already sold on their uniquely odd formula, but there is something admirable about their commitment to this off-kilter approach."

In a three-star review for Mojo, Victoria Segal called it "a record where everything escalates quickly, proof Snapped Ankles know exactly how to read the room." BrooklynVegan referred to it as "easily the group's best, most fun, and cathartic record yet" and "a real state-of-the-world record, taking a look at everything from the fractured post-Covid music industry to those evil conglomerates, and starting an impromptu dance party in an endless customs line."

== Track listing ==
Hard Times Furious Dancing track listing
| No. | Title | Length |
|---|---|---|
| 1. | "Pay the Rent" | 5:20 |
| 2. | "Personal Responsibilities" | 4:03 |
| 3. | "Raoul" | 5:07 |
| 4. | "Dancing in Transit" | 4:56 |
| 5. | "Where's the Caganer?" | 4:03 |
| 6. | "Smart World" | 3:27 |
| 7. | "Hagen Im Garten" | 4:10 |
| 8. | "Bai Lan" | 4:48 |
| 9. | "Closely Observed" | 6:16 |
| Total length: | | 42:10 |

== Personnel ==
Credits adapted from AllMusic.

- Capitol K – engineer
- Jake Long – additional production, drums, mixing, percussion, sequencers
- Jason Mitchell – mastering
- Jordan Parry – mixing, sequencers, synthesizer bass
- Louise Mason – design, photography
- Malcolm Catto – additional production, engineer
- Mikey Chestnutt – creative director, sequencing, synthesizer
- Paddy Austin – arranger, creative director, guitar, keyboards, synthesizer, vocals
- Snapped Ankles – composer, primary artist, producer
- Stuart Handy – composer

== Charts ==
Chart performance for Hard Times Furious Dancing
| Chart (2025) | Peak position |
|---|---|
| Scottish Albums (OCC) | 47 |
| UK Independent Albums (OCC) | 13 |
