= Rhythm (album) =

Studio album by Wildbirds & Peacedrums
- Released: 3 November 2014
- Genres: Pop, blues
- Length: 39:00
- Label: The Leaf Label
- Producer: Wildbirds & Peacedrums

Wildbirds & Peacedrums chronology
Rivers (2009)	Rhythm (2014)

Rhythm is the fourth full-length album by Swedish husband and wife duo Wildbirds & Peacedrums, released on The Leaf Label on 3 November 2014.

== Background ==
Rhythm was written, recorded and produced by Mariam Wallentin and Andreas Werliin in their Stockholm studio and focuses almost exclusively on Wallentin's vocals and Werliin's percussion. "Sound-wise we wanted it to feel like a live experience," Werliin explained in an interview. "Almost every song is one take. We recorded standing in the same room, no screens or isolation, looking each other in the eyes." The band described how after several busy years of touring they wanted to make a "going back to our roots" album, recorded in their own space with no time limits or external pressures.

== Critical reception ==
Professional ratings
Aggregate scores
Source	Rating
Metacritic	81/100
Review scores
Source	Rating
AllMusic	4/5 stars
All About Jazz	4.5/5 stars
Clash	8/10
The Guardian	4/5 stars
The Line of Best Fit	8/10
Mojo	4/5 stars
Q	4/5 stars
The Skinny	3/5 stars
Sputnikmusic	4.3/5
Uncut	8/10

On the Metacritic website, which aggregates reviews from critics and assigns a normalised rating out of 100, Rhythm received a score of 81, based on 2 mixed and 9 positive reviews. All About Jazz wrote that "Rhythm has rhythm, but it's also brimming over with melody, harmony and drama" and also praised Wallentin and Werliin's production, saying that it "gives the sound such richness and strength that its energy is almost palpable".

The Line Of Best Fit also commented on Werliin and Wallentin's approach of working on the album without any producers or external influences, describing the album as "at times almost uncomfortably intimate, with the duo's relationship - working and otherwise - obviously a major inspiration for the material." However, the journalist writes that through the "frustrations and tensions but also the release and the joy of crafting these odd, compelling sounds in a small space with a person you already spend an awful lot of time with...Their sweat and toil is the listener's gain….Rhythm must belong amongst the year's more impressive releases".

The Skinny wrote that the album sounded "ancient and thrillingly modern….as Andreas Werlin builds rhythms from soft shakers and hollow echoes, Mariam Wallentin delivers a soulful vocal that glides up and down octaves", but also commented that "[some] tracks take more time to reveal themselves, and this furtiveness occasionally threatens to douse Rhythm’s fireworks in a low dose of monotony. But excellence elsewhere counteracts the odd slump, with highlights ranging from Mind Blues’ curious clangs to Soft Wind, Soft Death’s jittery gospel".

== Track listing ==
No.	Title	Length
1.	"Ghosts and Pains"	3:50
2.	"The Offbeat"	4:10
3.	"Gold Digger"	4:39
4.	"Mind Blues"	3:22
5.	"Who I Was"	2:50
6.	"Soft Wind, Soft Death"	6:20
7.	"The Unreal vs. the Real"	4:48
8.	"Keep Some Hope"	4:23
9.	"Everything All the Time"	5:27

== Personnel ==
- Mariam Wallentin — vocals
- Andreas Werliin — drums and percussion
