= Beautiful Seizure =

Studio album by volcano!
- Released: October 25, 2005
- Recorded: January 2005
- Genre: Art rock
- Length: 55:57
- Label: The Leaf Label

Professional ratings
Review scores
Source	Rating
Pitchfork Media	(7.4/10)
Drowned in Sound	10/10 stars

Beautiful Seizure is the debut album by volcano!.

== Track listing ==
1. "Kalamazoo" - 1:12
2. "Easy Does It" - 6:47
3. "Fire Fire" - 5:25
4. "$40,000 Plus Interest" - 6:48
5. "Larchmontt's Arrival" - 1:14
6. "La Lluvia" - 2:43
7. "Red and White Bells" - 9:33
8. "Apple or a Gun" - 5:03
9. "Frozen in Escape" - 4:53
10. "Before the Suburbs" - 1:16
11. "Hello Explosion" - 4:10
12. "Pulling My Face in and out of Distortion, I Blink Too Much" - 6:53

== Personnel ==
- Mark Cartwright - laptop, synths, bass, melodica, tuba
- Sam Scranton - drums, percussion
- Aaron With - guitar, vocals
