= Triosk =

Experimental jazz and electronica band

- Origin: Sydney, New South Wales, Australia
- Genres: Jazz; electronica
- Years active: 2001–2007, 2022
- Labels: The Leaf
- Past members: Adrian Klumpes; Laurence Pike; Ben "Donny" Waples

Triosk was an experimental jazz, electronica band, which formed in 2001 by Adrian Klumpes on piano, rhodes and sampler; Laurence Pike on drums, percussion and programming, and Ben "Donny" Waples on electric and acoustic bass. They disbanded in 2007. Though coming from a jazz foundation, their sound has strong electronica elements as well as influences from the textures of musique concrète, with their use of loops of hisses and crackles. They released three albums: 1+3+1 in November 2003 (a collaboration with German electronic artist, Jan Jelinek, on Berlin label ~scape); Moment Returns (11 October 2004) and The Headlight Serenade (12 June 2006), both on The Leaf Label.

== History ==
Triosk were formed as a jazz-electronica trio in Sydney in 2001 by Adrian Kumpes on piano, Laurence Pike on drums and percussion and Ben "Donny" Waples on bass guitar. Stuart Nicholson of The Guardian noticed that they had "a shared love of the Bill Evans Trio and the German techno producer Jan Jelinek, who loves working with vinyl samples of jazz. Projecting Evans's introspective style through the prism of minimalism and electronic music."

K. Ross Hoffman of AllMusic felt their "stated intent was to perform improvisation-based music with electronics an 'active and equal' component. Taking the familiar jazz piano trio format as a starting point, they sought to broaden the scope and potential of the genre by incorporating the techniques and textures of minimalism and electronica, which meant both the layering of electronic and acoustic sounds and the electronic manipulation of their acoustic instruments, whether live in real time or afterwards in post-production."

Triosk's debut album was a collaboration with Jelinek, 1+3+1, which was issued by Triosk Meets Jelinek on 1 November 2003 via the latter artist's label, ~scape. Pitchfork's Nick Sylvester rated it at 7.3 out of 10 and felt that it "is not minimalist jazz; it is loop-based jazz, influenced and produced by a minimalist composer, and then given to a jazz trio with post-rock tendencies."

For their second album, Moment Returns, AllMusic's Joshua Glazer gave it a rating of three-and-a-half out of five and explained that it "offers only wrappings with the highest thread count, assuring exquisite softness and warmth... Each song takes you to the spectral places that exist in the best moments of classic jazz, when the players have all but stopped playing, the listeners have all but stopped listening, and only the air thick with mood remains. But without the once requisite chords, melodies, improvisations, or what-have-you needed to get to that place; it can feel a bit too easy." Pike produced and edited the album, which was released via The Leaf Label on 11 October 2004.

The Headlight Serenade, Triosk's third album, appeared on 27 June 2006 with Richard Pike (Laurence's brother) producing. Hoffman describes how "often they sacrifice nearly all of the fundamentals of jazz (and, for that matter, most music) – melody, all but the most basic chordal harmony, in some cases all but the vague suggestion of rhythm – in the single-minded pursuit of texture. It's this conceptual minimalism, the absence of jazz-like forms and structures, more than the actual sound of the album, that nudges [the album] from jazz toward the ambient/electronic category" to justify his rating of four out of five.

Laurence Pike was also a member of experimental rock band PVT (Warp), Roam the Hello Clouds and went on to tour with Flanger, Savath and Savalas, Jack Ladder, Qua and jazz veteran Mike Nock. Pianist Adrian Klumpes released a solo album titled Be Still on The Leaf Label in late 2006. Both Moment Returns and Headlight Serenade were co-produced by Richard Pike.

The band reunited for a one-off performance in 2022, playing at Sydney's Phoenix Central Park as part of Strata - a jazz and experimental mini-festival, curated by Pike.

== Members ==
- Adrian Klumpes (piano, rhodes, sampler)
- Laurence Pike (drums, percussion, programming)
- Ben 'Donny' Waples (electric and acoustic bass)

== Discography ==
Title	Album details
1+3+1 (with Jan Jelinek)	Released: 2003; Label: ~scape (~scape20cd); Formats: CD
Moment Returns	Released: 2004; Label: Leaf (BAY 39CD); Formats: CD, LP
The Headlight Serenade	Released: 2006; Label: Leaf (BAY 49CD); Formats: CD, LP

== Awards and nominations ==
=== AIR Awards ===
The Australian Independent Record Awards (commonly known informally as AIR Awards) is an annual awards night to recognise, promote and celebrate the success of Australia's Independent Music sector.

Year	Nominee / work	Award	Result
2007	The Headlight Serenade	Best Independent Jazz Album	Nominated
