= The Snake (Wildbirds & Peacedrums album) =

Studio album by Wildbirds & Peacedrums
- Released: 2008
- Recorded: Dec. 14–21, 2007
- Genre: Experimental rock, psychedelic folk
- Length: 42:58
- Label: The Leaf Label

Wildbirds & Peacedrums chronology
Heartcore (2007)	The Snake (2008)	Rivers (2010)

Professional ratings
Review scores
Source	Rating
Allmusic	4/5 stars
Pitchfork Media	(8.3/10)
Drowned in Sound	(8/10)
The Guardian	4/5 stars
musicOMH	4/5 stars
PopMatters	(8/10)
NME	(7/10)
Prefix Magazine	(8.5/10)

The Snake is an album by the Swedish duo Wildbirds & Peacedrums, released in 2008. It was recorded by the band and published by The Leaf Label. It was released to 'generally favorable reviews' with an average critic's score of 80/100 and an average user score of 9.6/10 on Metacritic.

In 2015, Apple selected the song "There Is No Light" to soundtrack the launch of their new streaming service, Apple Music.

== Track listing ==
1. "Island" – 2:33
2. "There Is No Light" – 2:46
3. "Chain of Steel" – 3:47
4. "So Soft So Pink" – 6:23
5. "Places" – 4:26
6. "Great Lines" – 5:37
7. "Today/Tomorrow" – 3:04
8. "Liar Lion" – 3:53
9. "Who Ho Ho Ho" – 2:51
10. "My Heart" – 7:38
