= Rivers (album) =

Studio album by Wildbirds & Peacedrums
- Released: 23 August 2010
- Genre: Blues, pop
- Length: 42:00
- Label: The Leaf Label
- Producer: Wildbirds & Peacedrums and Ben Frost

Wildbirds & Peacedrums chronology
| The Snake (2009) | Rivers (2010) | Rhythm (2014) |

Rivers is the third full-length album by Swedish husband and wife duo Wildbirds & Peacedrums, released on The Leaf Label on 23 August 2010.

== Background ==
Rivers is a full-length album combining two limited edition vinyl only 12" EPs, Retina and Iris, which were released in May and June 2010 respectively. Wildbirds & Peacdrums members Mariam Wallentin and Andreas Werliin travelled to Reykjavík in Iceland where they recorded the entire album in a single week, working with Australian producer Ben Frost. The Retina half of the album was recorded in the Guðríðarkirkja church and featured the Schola Cantorum Reykjavík Chamber Choir, arranged by cellist and composer Hildur Guðnadóttir. The tracks from the Iris EP were recorded in the Reykjavík’s Greenhouse studios.

In autumn 2015, Rivers was released by The Leaf Label as a single LP as part of the label's 20th anniversary celebrations. It was initially only available to fans through the PledgeMusic service before being available shops in early 2016.

== Critical reception ==
Professional ratings
Aggregate scores
| Source | Rating |
|---|---|
| Metacritic | 77/100 |
Review scores
| Source | Rating |
| All About Jazz | 4.5/5 stars |
| Tiny Mix Tapes | 3.5/5 marks |
| AllMusic | 4/5 stars |

On the Metacritic website, which aggregates reviews from critics and assigns a normalised rating out of 100, Rivers received a score of 77, based on 3 mixed and 11 positive reviews. All About Jazz wrote that "This is one of the most original, affecting and intense albums to emerge from the contemporary European music scene. At times disquieting and complex, at others sweet and simple, the songs have a timeless quality and, in Wallentin, the band has one of the most distinctive singers around. Rivers is beautiful". Tiny Mix Tapes described the album as "some of Wildbirds’ most bewitching and focused work to date". AllMusic noted that Rivers traded the "fiery outbursts of Heartcore and The Snake for a deeper dive into Wildbirds & Peacedrums’ wintry, introspective side" and praised the album for featuring "some of the duo’s most ambitious and fullest-sounding music".

In 2015, the song "Peeling Off the Layers" was used as the title music for the Sky Atlantic TV series Fortitude.

== Track listing ==
| No. | Title | Length |
|---|---|---|
| 1. | "Bleed Like There Was No Other Flood" | 5:06 |
| 2. | "Tiny Holes in This World" | 5:04 |
| 3. | "Under Land and Over Sea" | 3:44 |
| 4. | "Fight for Me" | 4.33 |
| 5. | "Peeling Off the Layers" | 4:22 |
| 6. | "The Wave" | 4:50 |
| 7. | "The Drop" | 3:42 |
| 8. | "The Course" | 5:25 |
| 9. | "The Lake" | 3:47 |
| 10. | "The Well" | 3:45 |

== Personnel ==
- Mariam Wallentin — vocals, steel pans
- Andreas Werliin — drums and percussion

== Additional personnel ==
- Schola Cantorum Reykjavík Chamber Choir
