= Prophecy (The Comet Is Coming EP) =

EP by the Comet Is Coming
- Released: 20 November 2015
- Recorded: Total Refreshment Centre Studios
- Genres: Nu jazz, electronic rock, space rock
- Length: 18:58
- Label: The Leaf Label
- Producers: Danalogue the Conqueror and Betamax Killer.

The Comet Is Coming chronology
| Prophecy (2015) | Channel the Spirits (2016) |

Prophecy is the first release from London-based band the Comet Is Coming. It was released by the Leaf Label digitally and as a 12" vinyl EP on 20 November 2015.

== Background ==
In an interview, saxophonist Shabaka Hutchings states that the music for Prophecy began out of jam sessions with Dan Leavers on synths and keys and Maxwell Hallett on drums. The band elaborate on this in an interview with The Quietus, saying how the music was composed in the studio whilst recording in a three-day session. They invited friends and guests into the studio, "referencing Parliament and Funkadelic and the way they recorded, with like a party going on in the studio". "Neon Baby" was initially released as a digital single accompanied by a music video featuring imagery from science fiction and B-movies, which can also be seen in the titles of the tracks on Prophecy. A music video for "Do The Milky Way" was released along with the album, premiering on The Quietus

== Track listing ==
All tracks written by King Shabaka, Danalogue the Conqueror and Betamax Killer, except "Final Days Of The Apocalypse" written by King Shabaka, Danalogue the Conqueror, Betamax Killer and Joshua Idehen.

1. "Neon Baby" – 3:42
2. "Star Exploding in Slow Motion" – 6:41
3. "Do the Milky Way" - 3:07
4. "Cosmic Serpent" - 2:58
5. "Final Days of the Apocalypse" - 2:30

== Personnel ==
The Comet Is Coming

- King Shabaka (Shabaka Hutchings) – tenor saxophone
- Danalogue The Conqueror (Dan Leavers) - keyboards and synthesisers
- Betamax Killer (Maxwell Hallett) – drums

Additional musicians

- Joshua Idehen – spoken word (5)
- Capitol K - percussion (3)
