= Uchū Nippon Setagaya =

Studio album by Fishmans
- Released: 24 July 1997
- Studio: Waikiki Beach
- Genre: Dream pop; downtempo; dub; trip hop; neo-psychedelia
- Length: 58:23
- Label: Polydor Records

Fishmans chronology
Long Season (1996)	Uchū Nippon Setagaya (1997)	8月の現状 (1998)

Uchū Nippon Setagaya (Japanese: 宇宙 日本 世田谷, lit. Space Japan Setagaya) is the seventh and final studio album by Japanese band Fishmans, released on July 24, 1997 on Polydor Records.

Professional ratings
Review scores
Source	Rating
Sputnikmusic	4.0/5

== Background ==
After signing a three-album deal with Polydor Records, Fishmans released Kūchū Camp and Long Season in 1996. By early 1997, they returned to their studio, Waikiki Beach, to record Uchū Nippon Setagaya, their final album under the contract. The process was difficult, after back-to-back releases and a packed touring schedule, the band was creatively and physically drained.

During this time, frontman Shinji Sato’s songwriting became more self-contained. He often arrived with nearly finished home demo recordings, leaving the rest of the band unsure of how to contribute. Drummer Kin-ichi Motegi later reflected on the challenge of adapting Sato’s increasingly refined ideas into a full-band setting. Recording took longer than expected, stretching into early June.

Despite these hurdles, Uchū Nippon Setagaya became one of Fishmans' most intricate and carefully crafted works, released in July 1997. Around this time, longtime engineer ZAK left the team, later recalling that he sensed "the end" while working on the album’s closing track, “Daydream.” Shortly after, Waikiki Beach closed on August 4 as its lease expired, marking the end of an era for the band.

This would be Fishmans' final studio album before their initial disbandment. They followed it with two live albums, 8 Gatsu no Genjō (1998) and 98.12.28 Otokotachi no Wakare (1999), the latter capturing their last concert with Shinji Sato. Three months later, he died due to heart issues, bringing Fishmans' original run to a close.

== Track listing ==
No.	Title	Length
1.	"Pokka Pokka"	4:04
2.	"Weather Report"	8:38
3.	"うしろ姿" (Ushiro Sugata; Back Figure)	5:12
4.	"In the Flight"	5:36
5.	"Magic Love"	4:55
6.	"バックビートにのっかって" (Bakkubīto ni Nokkatte; Stuck in the Backbeat)	8:26
7.	"Walking in the Rhythm"	12:55
8.	"Daydream"	8:37
Total length:		58:23

- Note: All tracks are presented in all caps, with the exception of tracks 3 and 6, which are in Japanese on all versions of the album. Translations for these tracks are approximate.

== Personnel ==
Adapted from CD liner notes:

Fishmans

- Shinji Sato – vocals, guitar
- Yuzuru Kashiwabara – bass guitar
- Motegi Kinichi – drums

Additional personnel and production

- Honzi – keyboards, violin, melodica, toy piano, mandolin
- Michio "Darts" Sekiguchi – additional guitars
- ZAK – producer, mixing, recording engineer
- Yuka Koizumi – mastering engineer
- Tak – recording engineer
- Mei Sumita – photography

== Charts ==
Chart（2016）	Peak position
Japan Weekly Charts (Oricon)	121
