= Szun Waves =

- Origin: London, England
- Genres: Experimental, jazz
- Years active: 2016–present
- Labels: Leaf, Buffalo Temple
- Members: Luke Abbott; Laurence Pike; Jack Wyllie
- Website: www.szunwaves.com

Szun Waves is a British band composed of electronic producer Luke Abbott, Laurence Pike of PVT on drums and Jack Wyllie of Portico Quartet on saxophone. The band combines elements of spiritual and experimental jazz with electronic music. Their debut album At Sacred Walls was released in 2016. In August 2018 they released the follow-up, New Hymn To Freedom.

The group's debut album At Sacred Walls was recorded at the studio of British electronic artist James Holden, from which the album takes its name. The album was released on Buffalo Temple records, a label run by Abbott.

New Hymn To Freedom was released on 31 August 2018 through The Leaf Label, on digital, CD, black vinyl and limited edition white vinyl. The album is made up of six "wholly unedited improvisations" that "illuminate the field on which many of UK’s experimental musicians have been playing of late". On this record "the trio has seamlessly integrated everything from jazz to psych to ambient to kosmische to experimental electronic music in their ongoing effort to reach a sort of enlightenment through performance".

Earth Patterns, Szun Waves' third album, was released on 19 August 2022.

== Discography ==
- At Sacred Walls (Buffalo Temple, 2016)
- New Hymn to Freedom (The Leaf Label, 2018)
- Earth Patterns (The Leaf Label, 2022)
