= Trust in the Lifeforce of the Deep Mystery =

Studio album by the Comet Is Coming
- Released: 15 March 2019
- Recorded: 20–22 February 2017, 3 August 2017
- Studios: Total Refreshment Studios, Dalston, London
- Length: 45:44
- Label: Impulse!
- Producers: Danalogue and Betamax

The Comet Is Coming chronology
Death to the Planet (2017)	Trust in the Lifeforce of the Deep Mystery (2019)	Hyper-Dimensional Expansion Beam (2022)

Singles from Trust in the Lifeforce of the Deep Mystery
- 1. "Summon the Fire" Released: 2019; 2. "Unity" Released: 2019

Professional ratings
Aggregate scores
Source	Rating
Metacritic	83/100
Review scores
Source	Rating
AllMusic	4.5/5 stars
Pitchfork	7.8/10

Trust in the Lifeforce of the Deep Mystery is the second studio album by English band the Comet Is Coming. It was released on 15 March 2019 under Impulse! Records.

== Track listing ==
Trust in the Lifeforce of the Deep Mystery track listing
No.	Title	Length
1.	"Because the End Is Really the Beginning"	4:48
2.	"Birth of Creation"	5:04
3.	"Summon the Fire"	3:55
4.	"Blood of the Past" (featuring Kae Tempest)	8:15
5.	"Super Zodiac"	4:01
6.	"Astral Flying"	4:43
7.	"Timewave Zero"	5:20
8.	"Unity"	4:13
9.	"The Universe Wakes Up"	5:25

== Personnel ==
- Daddy Kev – mastering engineer

== Charts ==
Chart performance for Trust in the Lifeforce of the Deep Mystery
Chart (2019)	Peak position
Scottish Albums (Official Charts)	21
UK Albums (Official Charts)	50
