= Volcano! (band) =

American art rock band

volcano!
- Origin: Chicago, Illinois, United States
- Genres: Art rock
- Years active: 2005 - present
- Label: The Leaf Label
- Members: Mark Cartwright; Sam Scranton; Aaron With
- Website: Official website

volcano! is a three-piece rock band from Chicago, Illinois that are influenced by classic rock, post-punk, free jazz and noise rock.

== History ==
The Leaf Label released the trio's critically acclaimed debut, Beautiful Seizure, in the US in late 2005 and worldwide in early 2006.

== Discography ==
=== Albums ===
- 2005 - Beautiful Seizure
- 2008 - Paperwork
- 2012 - Piñata

=== Singles ===
- 2006 - Apple or a Gun
- 2008 - Africa Just Wants to Have Fun
- 2009 - So Many Lemons
