= Adrian Klumpes =

Australian multi-instrumentalist

Adrian Lim-Klumpes
- Born: Adrian John Klumpes; Sydney, New South Wales, Australia
- Genres: Electronica; jazz; minimalism; ambient
- Occupation: Musician
- Instruments: Piano; keyboards; Fender Rhodes; synthesiser; sampler; vibraphone; marimba
- Years active: 2001–present
- Labels: The Leaf; Temporary Residence; Off
- Website: adrianlimklumpes.com

Adrian John Lim-Klumpes (born Adrian John Klumpes) is an Australian multi-instrumentalist who released his solo debut album, Be Still, in October 2006 on The Leaf Label.

Klumpes was a member of electronic jazz trio Triosk (2001–07) before starting his solo career. His next project was 3ofmillions, which released an album, Golden Calf 3, in 2008 on hellosQuare recordings.

From 2010 to 2015 he was a member of an improv group, Tangents. He issued his second solo album, Yield (Preludes and Fugues for Piano), in 2017.

== Personal life ==
Since 2016, Klumpes has performed under his married name, Adrian Lim-Klumpes.

== Discography ==
Album	Artist	Label	Year
1+3+1	Triosk Meets Jan Jelinek	~scape	2003
Moment Returns	Triosk	Leaf	2004
The Headlight Serenade	Triosk	Leaf	2006
Be Still	Adrian Klumpes	Leaf	2006
Golden Calf 3"	3ofmillions	hellosquare recordings	2008
BiP_HOp Generation Vol.9	Adrian Klumpes	BiP_HOp	2008
Passeridae II	Adrian Klumpes / Machinefabriek	Sound & Fury	2008
Immediate	3ofmillions	self released	2009
In Bed We Trust	Klumpes Ahmad	hellosquare recordings	2009
Abstruction	3ofmillions	Rufus Records	2011
I	Tangents	hellosquarerecordings	2013
Stateless	Tangents	Temporary Residence	2016
Yield (Preludes and Fugues for Piano)	Adrian Lim-Klumpes	OFF	2017
