= Heartcore (Wildbirds & Peacedrums album) =

Studio album by Wildbirds & Peacedrums
- Released: 2007
- Length: 40:28
- Label: The Leaf Label

Wildbirds & Peacedrums chronology
Heartcore (2007)	The Snake (2008)

Professional ratings
Review scores
Source	Rating
All About Jazz	4/5 stars
Allmusic	4/5 stars
Drowned in Sound	8/10 stars
The Observer	4/5 stars
Pitchfork Media	(8.0/10)
The Skinny	2/5 stars

Heartcore is an album by the Swedish duo Wildbirds & Peacedrums, released in 2007. It was recorded by the band and published by The Leaf Label.

== Track listing ==
1. "Pony" – 3:18
2. "The Way Things Go" – 2:03
3. "Bird" – 2:22
4. "I Can't Tell in His Eyes" – 4:09
5. "Doubt/hope" – 3:08
6. "A Story from a Chair" – 3:51
7. "The Battle in the Water" – 3:55
8. "The Ones that should Save Me get Me Down" – 2:48
9. "Lost Love" – 4:25
10. "The Window" – 2:38
11. "Nakina" – 3:00
12. "We Hold Each Other Song" – 4:56
