= Domenique Dumont =

Latvian musical group

Domenique Dumont is a collaboration between Latvian multi-instrumentalist and producer Arturs Liepins and vocalist, ethnomusicologist Anete Stuce.

== Musical career ==
Domenique Dumont began in 2013 with the creation of the album Comme Ça, released by the Parisian label Antinote in the summer of 2015. This was followed by 2018's Miniatures De Auto Rhythm, also on Antinote. Pitchfork described the single 'Le Soleil Dans Le Monde' as "an ultra-low BPM soundscape that reimagines the streets of Paris into a Balearic island".

In 2019, the group was invited to compose a soundtrack to the 1930 German silent film Menschen am Sonntag to be performed at the Les Arcs Film Festival in the French Alps that December. This soundtrack, composed of "13 new pieces Dumont’s shimmering synth-pop" was released by The Leaf Label in November 2020 under the title People On Sunday. The album was featured in All Music's Electronic Albums Of The Year and Bleep's Top 50 Albums of 2020.

Domenique Dumont has also performed at festivals including Villette Sonique and Le Point Éphémère in Paris, U.Percut in Marseille, Nuits Sonores in Lyon, Sinsal in Spain and Milhões de Festa in Portugal.

== Discography ==
- 2015 - Comme Ça (Antinote)
- 2018 - Miniatures De Auto Rhythm (Antinote)
- 2020 - People On Sunday (The Leaf Label)
- 2025 - Deux Paradis (Antinote)
