= Laurence Pike =

Drummer and electronic musician

- Origin: Australia
- Genres: Electronic; ambient; jazz; experimental
- Occupation: Instrumentalist
- Instruments: Drums; sampler

Laurence Pike is an Australian drummer and electronic musician. He studied at Sydney Conservatorium of Music under Mike Nock. Pike has specialised in improvised music, "[integrating] everything from jazz to psych to ambient to ... experimental electronic".

Pike is a member of PVT (formerly Pivot) and Szun Waves (with Luke Abbott, and Jack Wyllie of Portico Quartet), a former member of Triosk, and released his debut solo album Distant Early Warning on The Leaf Label on 30 March 2018. That album was recorded on a drum kit and sampler in one day, and was described by All About Jazz as "a technological and spiritual jazz suite" and "a work of intense serenity".

Pike is a longstanding member of Jack Ladder & The Dreamlanders (featuring Kirin J. Callinan, Donny Benét), and regularly tours and records with Sarah Blasko, and 4AD recording artist D.D Dumbo.

== Discography ==
=== Studio albums ===
List of studio albums, with selected details
Title	Album details
Beginning and End of Knowing (with Mike Nock)	Released: October 2015; Label: FWM Records (FWM006); Formats: CD, LP, digital download
Distant Early Warning	Released: 30 March 2018; Label: The Leaf Label (BAY 109); Formats: CD, LP, digital download, streaming
Holy Spring	Released: 17 May 2019; Label: The Leaf Label (BAY 114); Formats: CD, LP, digital download, streaming
Prophecy	Released: 24 July 2020; Label: The Leaf Label (BAY 123); Formats: CD, LP, digital download, streaming
Possible Utopias for Jazz Quintet	Released: 29 May 2026; Label: Balmat (BALMAT21); Formats: CD, LP, digital download, streaming

== Awards and nominations ==
=== National Live Music Awards ===
The National Live Music Awards (NLMAs) are a broad recognition of Australia's diverse live industry, celebrating the success of the Australian live scene. The awards commenced in 2016.

Year	Nominee / work	Award	Result
National Live Music Awards of 2016	Laurence Pike (PVT)	Live Drummer of the Year	Nominated
