= Fishmans =

Japanese pop band

- Fishmans in 1996. Left to right: Yuzuru Kashiwabara, Shinji Sato, Kin-ichi Motegi

Background information
- Origin: Minato, Tokyo, Japan
- Genres: Dub; neo-psychedelia; dream pop
- Years active: 1987–1999, 2005–present
- Labels: Virgin Japan; Media Remoras; Pony Canyon; Polydor; Milestone Crowds; Universal
- Members: Kin-ichi Motegi; Yuzuru Kashiwabara; Hakase-Sun
- Past members: Shinji Sato; Kensuke Ojima; Susumu Hisamatsu
- Website: www.fishmans.jp

Fishmans (Japanese: フィッシュマンズ, Hepburn: Fisshumanzu) are a Japanese band formed in Minato, Tokyo in 1987. They were founded by vocalist Shinji Sato, guitarist Kensuke Ojima, and drummer Kin-Ichi Motegi. Bassist Yuzuru Kashiwabara joined the band in 1988, followed by keyboardist Hakase-Sun in 1990. Kensuke Ojima left the band in 1994, and Hakase-Sun followed suit in 1995. They are known for their unique psychedelic sound, dub rhythms, and dream-pop reverie. Their music is distinguished by the distinctive vocals of the late lead singer Shinji Sato, the textural drumming of Kin-Ichi Motegi, and rocksteady basslines of Yuzuru Kashiwabara.

In 1999, lead vocalist and songwriter Shinji Sato suddenly died, forcing the band to suspend activities. However, in 2005, leader Kin-Ichi Motegi's passion led to the band reuniting. The band continues to perform Shinji Sato's songs. While never achieving widespread commercial success during their active years, Fishmans gradually accumulated an international cult following and wider recognition.

== History ==
=== 1987–1995: Early years ===
In the early summer of 1987 in Minato, Tokyo Fishmans would be formed by founding members Shinji Sato (vocals, guitar, trumpet), Kin-Ichi Motegi (drums, vocals, sampler), and Kensuke Ojima (guitar and vocals) out of Meiji Gakuin University. The group's first demo would be presented the same year, entitled Blue Summer by Sato, remaining incomplete to this day. In May 1988, Fishmans would start performing live in small venues in Tokyo, and bassist Yuzuru Kashiwabara would join their ranks in August of the same year. Their first recorded appearance was on the 1989 compilation Panic Paradise where two of their earliest songs make an appearance among four other ska-punk groups. In March 1990, keyboardist Hakase-Sun would join the band for their first solo live performance at Shibuya La.mama. In October of the same year, Virgin Records Japan (which would later be renamed to Media Remoras) would approach Fishmans with a record deal, which they promptly accepted. In November, Hakase-Sun officially joined the band, completing the band's original lineup before their first performance at Shibuya Club Quattro in March 1991. Roughly two years after their appearance on Panic Paradise, their first album Chappie Don't Cry was released, produced by musician Kazufumi Kodama. This followed the April 21 release of single "Hikouki (ひこうき)", the first of the band's numerous singles. Mr. Kodama had previous fame with the founding of influential Japanese dub group Mute Beat, and his pitch to create Chappie Don't Cry with Fishmans was simply stating to the group "let's make a rocksteady album". After the record, Kodama would no longer appear on any Fishmans project, leaving the record to live on as their most straightforward reggae outing in their discography by many fans. Producer ZAK would make his first of many appearances with Fishmans for a live concert performed that year in June, marking the beginning of a long collaborative history between him and band writer Sato.

Later the same year, Fishmans' self-produced first EP Corduroy's Mood would be released. The record was a profoundly more shibuya-kei take on reggae than their previous music, allowing the band to better experiment and brainstorm more complex compositions. The project was meant to express "a feeling of winter" within its four track runtime, and bears an only faint resemblance to their first LP due to its experimental nature. The band quickly developed a very easy-going sound (mainly influenced by reggae and dub, but also including elements of rock, pop, drum and bass, hip hop, ska, etc.), which was always coupled with Sato's distinctive androgynous vocals, slowly earning them significant acceptance in Japan's underground scene.

In 1992, the Japanese broadcasting company Fuji TV approached the group to write a theme song for television show 90 Days Totenam Pub (90日間トテナムパブ), and in response the band produced the first of many renditions of "100mm-Chottono (100ミリちょっとの)". The song aired on the program as an opener from January to March of that year, and the group released the track as a single on February 5.

From May to June 1992, Fishmans recorded with Japanese musician Haruo Kubota. Not much is known of these attempts to record, however it is known that after a night of getting drunk on sake, Kubota called the group to record in the studio in the middle of the night, causing significant confusion and embarrassment within the band members. This marked the end of the group's relations with the musician as they released their second album on October 21, King Master George. The record took a much more experimental direction with their sound, featuring everything from jazz rock to sunshine pop, throwing multiple styles at the wall to see what would stick. This included a reimagined version of "100ミリちょっとの", as well as introducing newer classics like "Nantettano (なんてったの)" and "Tayorinai Tenshi (頼りない天使)". Despite this experimentation, Fishmans always succeeded in avoiding reggae cliches, keeping a dub foundation powered by Motegi and Kashiwabara's rocksteady rhythm section.

The following year in 1993, Fishmans collaborated with ZAK in the studio for the first time to release Walkin on February 19. This was to much acclaim, which led the producer to continue working with them in another recording session in May. Multiple others would follow as the band worked to create their following single "Ikareta Baby (いかれたBaby)", a shockingly popular song that pushed the group to significant radio play at release, becoming their first breakout song. Naturally, this led to more collaborations with ZAK and the release of their third LP Neo Yankees' Holiday, including both aforementioned tracks, as well as the classic "Smilin' Days, Summer Holiday". The record cemented Fishmans' sound in a distinctly dub style, tinged with pleasant melodies and mellow sounds throughout. The band would follow the release of this record with many live performances, including appearances at Shibuya Parco, Shinsaibashi Club Quattro, and Nissin Power Station. They would proceed to tour around Tokyo from November 1 until the end of the year, changing their sound to approach a more rock-laiden style in preparation for the release of a fourth album.

On February 2, 1994, Fishmans released their maxi-single "Go Go Round This World!", furthering the sound achieved on Neo Yankees' Holiday towards a more funk-oriented direction. The single included a popular alternate mix of "Smilin' Days, Summer Holiday" that transformed the laid-back dub track into an energetic and bombastic jam that foreshadowed the sensibilities coming in their next album. This time of rapid maturation led to guitarist Kensuke Ojima leaving the group in May of that year, letting the band of four continue without him. Despite this sudden departure, the group released their second maxi-single on June 17 entitled "Melody", a groovy piano-based production that served as one of Fishmans' most important singles going forward. The maxi-single also marked the first time Fishmans printed any of their material on vinyl as well as CD, the single being printed on 12" analogue vinyl in a limited quantity of 1000 to be offered only at live venues. After this release, the group managed to recruit Buffalo Daughter guitarist suGar Yoshinaga for further recording intended for their next album. On October 21, the single "My Life" and new album Orange were released simultaneously, taking the group towards a more defined funk rock sound, along with a newly redefined version of "Melody". Certain tracks on the release, such as "Kaerimichi (帰り道)", foreshadowed their turn towards dream pop which would follow in the later 90s. These advancements in musical style would only advance further with the coming of 1995, showing the group's versatility in sound.

=== 1995–1998: Kūchū Camp, Long Season, and Uchū Nippon Setagaya ===
On March 17, 1995, Fishmans released their first live album Oh! Mountain following a five-city tour in celebration of Orange's release. The album isn't a "true live" album however, as much of the content presented was remixed by ZAK in studio to improve sound quality and add interesting sounds to create a unique home listening experience. The recordings included on the album originated from a total of 11 different concerts.

It was the spring after the release of Oh! Mountain that Fishmans signed with Polydor Records. Polydor had supplied the group with their own recording studio, Waikiki Beach, where they began recording new material in August. That September, a celebratory live concert titled Let's Polydor was held to encourage the move away from Media Remoras. Hakase-Sun was to leave the group immediately following this concert, and the resulting trio would work with a series of guest musicians on their next records, primarily Honzi (keyboards, violin, accordion and vocals) of A Decade-In Fake (later Honzi's World) and Shinya Kogure (guitar) of Hicksville. The further solidification of ZAK on sound mixing rounded out this second phase of the band, which further evolved its sound to incorporate space rock, ambient and psychedelic elements. Song length and scope continued to grow as well, as these new tendencies blended with their dub foundation. Following this significant lineup change, Fishmans released what is possibly the band's most recognizable single, "Nightcruising (ナイトクルージング)" on November 25. The song was a sudden yet welcome shift towards dream pop, serving as an introduction to what would become their next studio album.

On February 1, 1996, Fishmans would release their fifth studio album Kūchū Camp (空中キャンプ), which readily flaunted a more stripped-down, tight production quality. Producer ZAK and writer Sato would often work together on the record to create songs that were more stripped down to their most basic elements, instead of flooding them with lush backgrounds, which contributed to a simpler, cleaner and more crisp output. This, along with the group's much more mature dream pop sensibilities helped to cement the group as a serious, legitimate rock act in the wider world stage. This would become a consistent style of Fishmans' music for the remainder of their career, further separating them from their earlier days of simple reggae music. The album was also printed on limited edition colored vinyl, making this the first of Fishmans' albums to be printed on vinyl records. In celebration of a successful album release, the group embarked on a 10-show tour titled Young but Historical (若いながらも歴史あり) which would much later be printed on DVD video. During these tours, support guitarist Michigo "Darts" Sekiguchi would agree to permanently accompany Fishmans for support during the remainder of their career. Following this on March 27, Fishmans released the mellow, yet popular single Baby Blue from Kūchū Camp which reminded of Fishmans' more sensible, soft side contrasting with their new dream pop sound.

Despite their relatively wide success, Sato and company found it attractive to experiment with alternative sounds and projects they had never attempted before. Starting in July, the band began to record standalone single Season to tease their upcoming full-length LP Long Season, a 35-minute-long epic based heavily on "Season" divided into five parts. The group finished in August, however Season was only released on September 25 and its accompanying album on October 25. Recorded in their Waikiki Beach private studio, the lyrics and melodies presented on the album are intended to be incredibly personal to Sato and to present a dreamlike musical experience. This would ultimately become their most recognizable studio album among underground music communities for its experimentation and truly unique structure. Following the album's release, Fishmans performed the song live on its own for the first time, and with every consecutive performance of the song, the band intended to change the composition so that it would never be played the same twice. Towards the year's end, Fishmans played in Kobe, Nagoya and Tokyo for a new tour entitled Long Season '96～'97. Through February to June 1997, Fishmans would consistently record new material in their Waikiki Beach studio, making this the longest continuous period of time they spent actively recording. At a very early stage during these recordings, the group began recording with music software Pro Tools, completing their new material entirely within the program. On July 2, their single Magic Love was released to tease their next project, coupled with a B-side remixed by Hiroshi Kawabe of Tokyo No. 1 Soul Set fame. Fishmans had been growing a friendship with the group, and this remix solidified that relationship between the two bands.

Their final studio project, Uchū Nippon Setagaya (宇宙 日本 世田谷), was released on July 24 and took the group in a much more ambient pop direction than their previous LPs. Lyrically, the album focused on personal everyday life while retaining a wide worldview that inspired the title of the record, steadily magnifying from space, down to Japan, and down to the city of Setagaya. The album included single Magic Love, as well as standout tracks "Walking in the Rhythm", "Weather Report" and others, pushing much of the record to stand out as a classic in their discography. To coincide with the album's release, a tour entitled Uchū Nippon Okudaizumu (宇宙 日本 奥田イズム) was conducted, which included twelve shows across Japan.

The four-track remix maxi-single Walking in the Rhythm was also released on October 22, showing the group's prowess in revitalizing their compositions in new and interesting ways, as well as the group's fondness for that particular song. This was followed by the Walking In the 奥田イズム tour through Osaka, Nagoya and Tokyo, one such full concert (conducted on December 12) being broadcast in full by Japanese music television program Space Shower TV on February 22, 1998. Fishmans proceeded to make numerous appearances on Space Shower TV throughout 1998, after which in 2007 three "episodes" were released on DVD cataloging their complete broadcasts on the program. These mostly consisted of a multitude of rare live concerts and interviews, as well as a full music video for Long Season on Episode 2 and a half-hour long live dub mix of "Walking in the Rhythm" and Sore wa Tada no Kibun sa (それはただの気分さ) on Episode 3.

Beginning at the start of the year, the group began organizing a new live album after their 1997 live performances at their private studio, as well as at Polydor's studios. Meanwhile, in March, the group performed in concert again at four locations in Japan in their Teion Basshu (低音バッシュ) tour. Their live album was completed in May and released on August 19, titled 8 Gatsu no Genjō (8月の現状), a remixed and newly produced compilation of Fishmans' best live performances from 1996 to 1998. This style of remixed live performances bore significant resemblance to their previous live output Oh! Mountain, leaving the two albums to be easily compared as sibling releases. A tour was conducted by the same name in August to coincide with the live album's release, concluding on October 10 at Hibiya Open-Air Concert Hall which included a complete performance of unreleased song "A Piece of Future", a song that seemed to foreshadow a turn towards post-rock for the band.

In July of that year, the band began work on a longer length, new song titled "Yurameki in the Air (ゆらめき in the Air)", a 13-minute long movement not found on any studio album of theirs, although taking the same sonic style as their previous LP 宇宙 日本 世田谷. This long-form song structure was in similar fashion to their previous LP Long Season, although not nearly on the same grandiose scale. Following the single's December 2 release, however, band member Yuzuru Kashiwabara expressed disinterest in continuing his musical career, electing to leave the band with the coming of the new year.

=== 1998–2004: Otokotachi no Wakare, death of Sato, and disbandment ===
In December 1998, Fishmans held five concerts for the Otokotachi no Wakare Tour (男達の別れツアー) to grant bass player Kashiwabara a last hurrah with the group. The tour concluded with two back-to-back shows, one on December 27 and the other on the 28th, both performed at Akasaka Blitz in Minato.

Fishmans performed their final concert on December 28, 1998. That night, they played many of their most widely acclaimed songs and concluded with a full performance of Long Season. This was to be Kashiwabara's final performance with the band, and Sato with Motegi planned to continue working as Fishmans. Sato died from heart failure on March 15, 1999 at the age of 33. Fishmans' last concert was released as the live album 98.12.28 Otokotachi no Wakare (98.12.28 男達の別れ) on September 29, 1999. It has gone on to receive critical and fan praise.

The death of Sato was so sudden that Polydor, their record label, had already prematurely scheduled the release of two compilation releases for only two days after his death. Fishmans 1991–1994 Singles & More, a compilation of Media Remoras-era releases was released on March 17, as well as The Three Birds & More Feelings, a collection of the band's PVs on VHS (later re-pressed on DVD) recorded by Kensuke Kawamura.

Later in the year on June 30, the compilation album Aloha Polydor was released, featuring many of Fishmans' Polydor-era songs as well as an unreleased demo of Sore wa Tada no Kibun sa (それはただの気分さ), a song Fishmans had been working on at the time of Sato's death. The following month, Motegi was supported by Kashiwabara, Honzi, Darts, as well as former members Hakase-Sun and Kensuke Ojima on a three-show live event in Japan titled Fishmans-teki Kumiai (フィッシュマンズ的組合) under the Fishmans name.

Breaking into the twenty-first century was difficult for Fishmans with the loss of their lead vocalist and writer. On October 25, 2000, the live video album Kioku no Zōdai (記憶の増大) was released, cataloging many rare videos of live performances Fishmans made over the years with Sato. The following month, a live event was held at Shinjuku Liquid Room to synchronize with the video performances where a band played over the video, including Motegi on drums. The event was held again in April 2001 at Nagoya and Osaka, spreading awareness of the video album's release.

After Sato's death, Kin-Ichi Motegi began working as a stand-in drummer for Tokyo Ska Paradise Orchestra, whose original drummer died around the same time as Sato. He eventually became a full-fledged member of the band and plays drums and sings lead vocals with them. Kashiwabara, who had originally planned to abandon the music industry, eventually joined forces with Yusuke Oya (ex-LabLife) to form Polaris, whose spacey and dubby tracks bear significant resemblance to Fishmans' sound in the late '90s. Both Motegi and Kashiwabara would later join forces with Takashi Kato of Tokyo Ska Paradise Orchestra and Losalios to form rock group So Many Tears, whose music leans further towards indie rock and alternative rock productions than that of Fishmans' more dub-influenced sound.

=== 2004–present: Reunions, cult popularity, and reissues ===
Despite the death of Sato and Fishmans disbanding, their popularity continued to grow. In 2004, a tribute album Sweet Dreams for Fishmans was released, including covers by artists as diverse as OOIOO, Bonobos, and UA. This was followed by the compilation albums Kūchū (空中) and Uchū (宇宙) in 2005, which included rare and unreleased tracks alongside their best hits. Among these was A Piece of Future, a 10-minute long post-rock track only ever performed live by Fishmans finally released to the public. This song was later remixed by tribute project Fishmans+, a project whose membership includes the likes of Cornelius, Ryuichi Sakamoto and many other Japanese musicians, as well as a large majority of original Fishmans members.

On November 22, 2005 the remaining members of Fishmans paid tribute to their fans and Shinji Sato by performing live at the Rising Sun Rock Festival. The show lasted three and a half hours, and featured many guest singers, who performed on vocals. The following month, a tribute art exhibition The Long Season Rewind was held in Shibuya with contributions from various artists. In the same month, live compilation single いかれたBaby / 感謝(驚) / Weather Report was released, featuring three remixed live performed songs courtesy of ZAK.

In 2006, The Long Season Revue was released on DVD (directed by Kensuke Kawamura), which contained a nearly complete live video of Fishmans' tribute concert on November 22 of the previous year. A complete performance of "Long Season" was conducted at the concert, however for unknown reasons it is not present on The Long Season Revue. The live video was originally only screened in theatres and it featured the original members of the band together with a cast of supporting musicians such as UA, Asa-Chang, Hanaregumi, Oki Yuichi (of Tokyo Ska Paradise Orchestra) and Ikuko Harada of Clammbon. Following these concerts, Honzi, a long-time contributor with the band, died on September 27, 2007 at the age of 40.

Since 2006, the band has played a number live shows at festivals. On May 3, 2011, Fishmans held a three-hour-long revival concert at Hibiya Nozon which was recorded and distributed on DVD by Kampsite TV (Japanese Internet broadcaster for Japanese indies, music videos and other video productions) in similar fashion to the Fishmans Space Shower TV episodes printed in 2007. The DVD was titled Live 2011/5.3 at Hibiya Open-Air Concert Hall "A Piece of Future". In 2016, the group played 3 shows in Nagoya, Tokyo and Osaka featuring a number of original band members and guests. In February 2019, Fishmans collaborated live with Japanese jazz-rock group cero at Zepp Tokyo, a venue Fishmans would visit for the first time in 20 years. This was in similar fashion to a live show Fishmans had recorded with Japanese J-pop group Sakanaction in 2012. Fishmans performed a series of shows in 2023 to celebrate the 27th anniversary of Long Season.

On August 2018, Fishmans' music was added to Spotify, iTunes and YouTube for streaming purposes, which has helped to increase Fishmans' fanbase, especially overseas in North America and Europe. They have also gained a significant amount of new recognition through internet forums such as /mu/ and Rate Your Music.

== Members ==
=== Current members ===
- Kin-ichi Motegi (茂木 欣一) – drums, sampler, backing vocals (1987–1999, 2005–present), lead vocals (1999, 2005—present)
- Yuzuru Kashiwabara (柏原 譲) – bass (1988–1998, 1999, 2005–present)
- Hakase-Sun (ハカセ サン) – keyboards (1990–1995, 1999, 2005–present)

=== Current supporting members ===
- Michio "Darts" Sekiguchi (ダーツ関口) – guitar (1996–1999, 2005–present)
- Shinya Kogure (木暮 晋也) – guitar (1995–1999, 2005–present)
- Ikuko Harada - vocals (2005-present)
- MahiTo - vocals (2023-present)

=== Former members ===
- Shinji Sato (佐藤 伸治) – lead vocals, guitar, trumpet (1987–1999; died 1999)
- Kensuke Ojima (小嶋 謙介) – guitar, backing vocals (1987–1994, 1999)
- Susumu Hisamatsu (久松 すすむ) – bass (1987–1988)

=== Former supporting members ===
- Honzi – keyboards, violin, accordion, backing vocals (1995–1999, 2005–2007; died 2007)
- ZAK – production, sound mix (1995–1997)
- Mito - bass (2025)
- Ohzora Kimishima - guitar, vocals (2025)

== Discography ==
=== Studio albums ===
- Chappie, Don't Cry (1991, Virgin Japan)
- King Master George (1992, Media Remoras)
- Neo Yankees' Holiday (1993, Media Remoras)
- Orange (1994, Media Remoras)
- Kūchū Camp (空中キャンプ) (1996, Polydor) #46 Oricon
- Long Season (1996, Polydor) #50 Oricon
- Uchū Nippon Setagaya (宇宙 日本 世田谷) (1997, Polydor) #39 Oricon

=== EPs ===
- Corduroy's Mood (1991)
- A Sprout EP (1993)
- I Dub Fish (2016)

=== Live albums ===
- Oh! Mountain (1995, Media Remoras)
- Hachigatsu no genjō (1998, Polydor)
- 98.12.28 Otokotachi no Wakare (1999, Polydor)
- Long Season '96～7 96.12.26 Akasaka Blitz (2016, Polydor)
- Wakai nagaramo rekishi ari 96.3.2@ Shinjuku Liquid Room (2021, Universal Music Group)

=== Compilations ===
- Fishmans 1991–1994 Singles & More (1999, Pony Canyon)
- Aloha Polydor (1999, Polydor)
- 宇宙 ベスト・オブ・フィッシュマンズ (2005, Polydor)
- 空中 ベスト・オブ・フィッシュマンズ (2005, Polydor)
- Fishmans Rock Festival (2007) (vinyl box set of all Polydor-era releases)
- Golden Best Fishmans: Polydor Years (2012, Universal)
- Go Go Round This World! ~ Fishmans 25th Anniversary Record Box (2016) (vinyl box set of all Media Remoras-era releases)
- BLUE SUMMER ~Selected Tracks 1991–1995~ (2018, Pony Canyon)
- Night Cruising 2018 (2018, Universal)

=== Singles ===
● ひこうき (1991)

No.	Title	Length
1.	"ひこうき"	5:06
2.	"Little Flapper"	4:59

● いなごが飛んでる (1991)

No.	Title	Length
1.	"いなごが飛んでる"	3:42
2.	"It's Be Alright"	5:00

● 100ミリちょっとの (1992)

No.	Title	Length
1.	"100ミリちょっとの"	4:03
2.	"あの娘が眠ってる (P.W.M.ヴァージョン)"	3:59

● Walkin' (1993)

No.	Title	Length
1.	"Walkin'"	5:18
2.	"青空のように"	2:34
3.	"いなごが飛んでる (Tokyo Tower Mix)"	3:42

● いかれたBaby (1993)

No.	Title	Length
1.	"いかれたBaby"	4:50
2.	"Blue Summer (Live)"	6:05

● Go Go Round This World! (1994)

No.	Title	Length
1.	"Go Go Round This World!"	3:38
2.	"Smilin' Days, Summer Holiday (Kick the Space Echo Session)"	7:15
3.	"Go Go Round This World! (Naked Funk Mix)"	3:34
4.	"Future (Remix)"	4:45

● My Life (1994)

No.	Title	Length
1.	"My Life"	3:50
2.	"救われる気持ち (Live)"	3:55

● Melody (1994)

No.	Title	Length
1.	"Melody"	5:18
2.	"静かな朝"	5:55
3.	"オアシスへようこそ"	6:27
4.	"Wedding Baby"	4:19

● ナイト クルージング (1995)

No.	Title	Length
1.	"ナイト クルージング"	6:02
2.	"ナイト クルージング (Plasma Mix)"	7:39

● Baby Blue (1996)

No.	Title	Length
1.	"Baby Blue"	6:08
2.	"Sunny Blue (Hicksville Mix)"	3:46

● Season (1996)

No.	Title	Length
1.	"Season"	5:44
2.	"I Dub Fish"	7:08

● Magic Love (1997)

No.	Title	Length
1.	"Magic Love"	4:56
2.	"Magic Love (Remix)"	3:44

● Walking in the Rhythm (1997)

No.	Title	Length
1.	"Walking in the Rhythm (Prototype Mix)"	4:49
2.	"Walking in the Rhythm (Hang-Glider Mix)"	10:04
3.	"Walking in the Rhythm (Shinjuku-Version 2 Mix)"	14:42
4.	"Walking in the Rhythm (Reprise Mix)"	7:44

● ゆらめき in the Air (1998)

No.	Title	Length
1.	"ゆらめき in the Air"	13:31
2.	"ゆらめき in the Air (Backing Track) [Vinyl Exclusive]"	13:31

● いかれたBaby / 感謝(驚) / Weather Report (2005)

No.	Title	Length
1.	"いかれたBaby"	5:45
2.	"感謝(驚)"	7:15
3.	"Weather Report"	11:28

● Seasons (Life) (2006)

No.	Title	Length
1.	"Season"	5:44
2.	"I Dub Fish"	7:13
3.	"Long Season"	10:18

=== Videos (Live and Compiled Live) ===
- The Three Birds & More Feelings (2000, Polydor) (Directed by Kensuke Kawamura)
- 記憶の増大 (2000, Polydor) (Directed by Kensuke Kawamura)
- 若いながらも歴史あり96.3.2 @ 新宿 Liquid Room (11/09/2005) (Directed by Kensuke Kawamura)
- 男達の別れ 98.12.28 @ 赤坂 Blitz (2005, Universal Music Japan) (Directed by Kensuke Kawamura)
- The Long Season Revue (2006, Pony Canyon) (Directed by Kensuke Kawamura)
- Fishmans in Space Shower TV: Episode.1 (2007)
- Fishmans in Space Shower TV: Episode.2 (2007)
- Fishmans in Space Shower TV: Episode.3 (2007)
- Live 2011/5.3 At Hibiya Open-Air Concert Hall "A Piece of Future" (2012, kampsite) (Directed by Kensuke Kawamura)

=== Videos (Music Video) ===
- Night Cruising「ナイトクルージング」 (1995, Polydor) (Directed by Kensuke Kawamura)
- Slow Days (1995, Polydor) (Directed by Kensuke Kawamura)
- Baby Blue (1996, Polydor) (Directed by Kensuke Kawamura)
- SEASON (1996, Polydor) (Directed by Kensuke Kawamura)
- MAGIC LOVE (1997, Polydor) (Directed by Kensuke Kawamura)
- WALKING IN THE RHYTHM (1997, Polydor) (Directed by Kensuke Kawamura)
- Yurameki in the Air「ゆらめき in the Air」 (1998, Polydor) (Directed by Kensuke Kawamura)

=== Videos (on Space Shower TV) ===
- Nobody in Tokyo (Video Jingle for Space Shower TV, Japanese Music TV Channel) (1998) (Directed by Kensuke Kawamura) YouTube
