= Channel the Spirits =

Studio album by the Comet Is Coming
- Released: 1 April 2016
- Genres: Nu jazz, electronic rock, neo-psychedelia, space rock
- Label: The Leaf Label
- Producer: Danalogue The Conqueror/Betamax Killer

The Comet Is Coming chronology
Prophecy (2015)	Channel the Spirits (2016)	Death to the Planet (2017)

Singles from Channel the Spirits
- 1. "Space Carnival" Released: 2016

Channel the Spirits is the first full-length album by London-based band the Comet Is Coming. It was released on 1 April 2016 by The Leaf Label.

== Background ==
Described as a "prophetic document" and "the beginning of the end" by The Leaf Label, Channel the Spirits draws on the same influences of jazz, electronica, psychedelia and sci-fi references as the previous release from The Comet Is Coming, Prophecy. The first single, "Space Carnival", was premiered on The Quietus, who described the track as a demonstration of "the group refining their cosmic jazz stylings".

In an interview with M magazine, band member Betamax Killer said of the album:

Channel The Spirits was meant to be a soundtrack to planet Earth’s doom. To stare death in the face and explore a symphony of human emotions. Panic, hope, defiance, fear, brotherhood and a release from cultural restrictions. We hoped to discover the underlying human power beneath the mundane day-to-day routines of modern life. Through the process of making the record we have been on a journey together through the distant realms of our collective mind. It feels like we have become creative space explorers.

== Critical reception ==
Bearded magazine wrote that "this is a debut album that will leave you dumbfounded, reeling, exhausted and inspired". The Quietus praised the "sense of perspiring, physical energy that pulses through almost everything" and the "outrageous, head-snapping riff and hip-snapping beat[s]" as well as the "echoes...of Space Invaders, 70s sci-fi films, the BBC Radiophonic Workshop, post-punk, Fela Kuti, and 80s dance and electronica as well as...Sun Ra, Parliament, and Funkadelic". Penny Black Music called the album "engaging, atmospheric and intoxicating...one of the more forward-thinking and groundbreaking albums you will hear this year...not to be missed".

In August 2016, the album was shortlisted for the Mercury Prize.

=== Accolades ===
Publication	Accolade	Year	Rank	Ref.
Mojo	The 50 Best Albums of 2016	2016	48	
The Quietus	Albums of the Year 2016	2016	60	
Uncut	Top 75 albums of the year	2016	71	
Time Out New York	Best Albums of 2016	2016	21	
The Line of Best Fit	The Best Fit Fifty Essential Albums of 2016	2016	44	
Fopp	the best albums of 2016	2016	89	

== Track listing ==
All tracks written by the Comet Is Coming

1. "The Prophecy" – 1:49
2. "Space Carnival" – 3:36
3. "Journey Through the Asteroid Belt" – 5:33
4. "Nano" – 1:16
5. "New Age" – 5:27
6. "Slam Dunk in a Black Hole" – 2:26
7. "Cosmic Dust" – 3:26
8. "Star Furnace" – 5:37
9. "Channel the Spirits" – 4:04
10. "Deep Within the Engine Deck" – 1:22
11. "Lightyears" – 4:46
12. "End of Earth" – 2:16

== Personnel ==
The Comet Is Coming

- King Shabaka – tenor saxophone
- Danalogue the Conqueror – keys
- Betamax Killer – drums

Additional musicians

- Joshua Idehen – spoken word (11)
