= Hyper-Dimensional Expansion Beam =

Studio album by the Comet Is Coming
- Released: 23 September 2022
- Studio: Real World (Wiltshire)
- Genre: Jazz
- Length: 43:32
- Label: Impulse!

The Comet Is Coming chronology
Trust in the Lifeforce of the Deep Mystery (2019)	Hyper-Dimensional Expansion Beam (2022)

Singles from Hyper-Dimensional Expansion Beam
- 1. "Code" Released: 29 July 2022

Professional ratings
Aggregate scores
Source	Rating
AnyDecentMusic?	7.5/10
Metacritic	82/100
Review scores
Source	Rating
AllMusic	4.5/5 stars
Crack	7/10
Exclaim!	8/10
God Is in the TV	7/10
NME	4/5 stars
The Skinny	4/5 stars
Spectrum Culture	65%

Hyper-Dimensional Expansion Beam is the third and final studio album by English band the Comet Is Coming. It was released on 23 September 2022 under Impulse! Records.

== Background ==
On 29 July 2022, The Comet is Coming announced the release of their new album, along with the first single "Code".

== Critical reception ==
Hyper-Dimensional Expansion Beam was met with "universal acclaim" reviews from critics. At Metacritic, which assigns a weighted average rating out of 100 to reviews from mainstream publications, this release received an average score of 82, based on 8 reviews. Aggregator AnyDecentMusic? gave the release a 7.5 out of 10 based on a consensus of 10 reviews.

At Exclaim!, critic reviewer Chris Bryson said "Hyper-Dimensional Expansion Beam sees the band finding new pockets to dwell in and galaxies to explore. One of the Comet Is Coming's most distinguishing aspects is the massiveness of their sound, and that comes through again on Hyper-Dimensional Expansion Beam — the crisp, deft drums, the bass crunch, the alien-firefly-weaving-through-the-sky sax, and the kaleidoscopic synths that fill in the rest." Laurie Presswood of The Skinny described the release as "bass-laden and synthesised, with shimmering inverted pedals that set the stage for extraterrestrial adventures in jazz."

=== Accolades ===
Publications' year-end list appearances for Hyper-Dimensional Expansion Beam
Critic/Publication	List	Rank	Ref
AllMusic	AllMusic's Top Albums of 2022	NA	
DJ Mag	DJ Mag's Top Albums of 2022	NA	
Mojo	Mojo's Top 50 Albums of 2022	18	
Treble	Treble's Top 50 Albums of 2022	19	
Uncut	Uncut's Top 75 Albums of 2022	28	

== Track listing ==
Hyper-Dimensional Expansion Beam track listing
No.	Title	Length
1.	"Code"	4:15
2.	"Technicolour"	3:29
3.	"Lucid Dreamer"	3:29
4.	"Tokyo Nights"	0:49
5.	"Pyramids"	4:50
6.	"Frequency of Feeling Expansion"	4:31
7.	"Angel of Darkness"	6:57
8.	"Aftermath"	3:13
9.	"Atomic Wave Dance"	4:44
10.	"The Hammer"	3:06
11.	"Mystik"	4:09
Total length:		43:32

== Personnel ==
- Daddy Kev – mastering engineer

== Charts ==
Chart performance for Hyper-Dimensional Expansion Beam
Chart (2022)	Peak position
Belgian Albums (Ultratop Flanders)	39
Scottish Albums (Official Charts)	24
