= Jan Jelinek =

German electronic musician

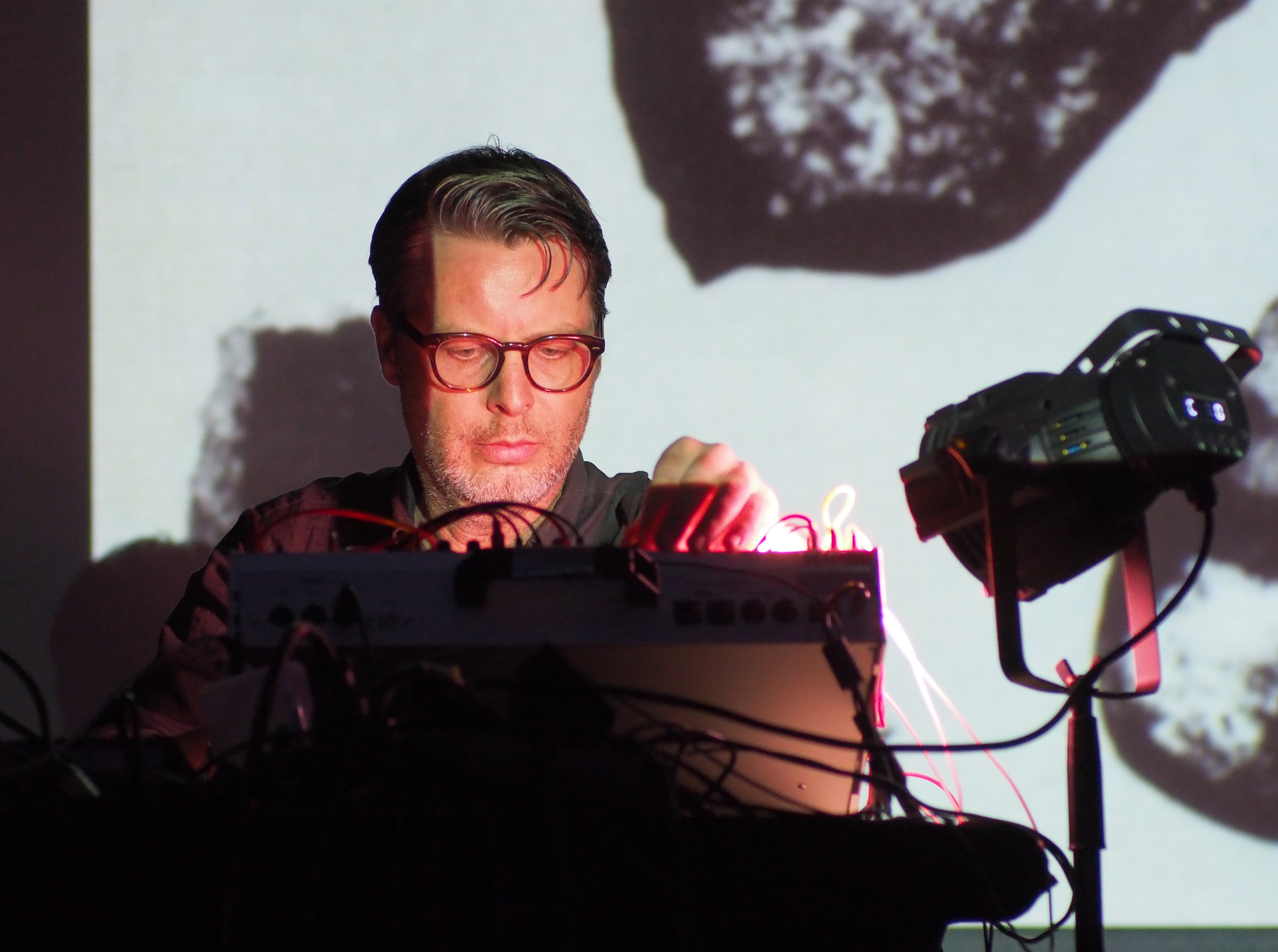
- Jelinek in 2020

Background information
- Also known as: The Exposures; Farben; Gesellschaft zur Emanzipation des Samples; Gramm; N. Gratin
- Origin: Berlin, Germany
- Genres: Minimal techno; glitch; microhouse; ambient; IDM
- Occupations: Musician, producer
- Years active: 1998–present
- Labels: ~scape; En/Of; Soup Disk; Audiosphere; Faitiche
- Member of: Groupshow
- Website: www.janjelinek.com

Jan Jelinek is a German electronic musician who also operates under the names Farben, Gramm and The Exposures, among others. His music is usually categorized as minimal techno, glitch or microhouse, and is characterized by deep basslines, extensive use of samples from earlier jazz and rock recordings, and clicks & cuts effects. He is the founder of the German record label Faitiche.

== Discography ==
Albums

- Personal Rock (as Gramm; Source, 1999)
- Loop-Finding-Jazz-Records (~scape, 2001)
- Improvisations and Edits Tokyo 09/26/2001 (with Computer Soup; Soup-Disk, 2002)
- Textstar (as Farben; Klang Elektronik, 2002)
- 1+3+1 (with Triosk; ~scape, 2003)
- La Nouvelle Pauvreté (as The Exposures; ~scape, 2003)
- Kosmischer Pitch (~scape, 2005)
- Lost Recordings 2000–2004 (as The Exposures; Eastern Developments, 2005)
- Tierbeobachtungen (~scape, 2006)
- Bird, Lake, Objects (with Masayoshi Fujita; Faitiche, 2010)
- Schaum (with Masayoshi Fujita; Faitiche, 2016)
- Zwischen (Faitiche, 2018)
- Puls-Plus-Puls (with Sven-Åke Johansson; Ni-Vu-Ni-Connu, 2019)
- Signals Bulletin (with Asuna; Faitiche, 2019)
- The Raw and the Cooked (Faitiche, 2021)
- Soundtrack for SEASCAPE – polyptych (Faitiche, 2023)
- Social Engineering (Faitiche, 2024)

Extended plays

- Tendency (~scape, 2000)
- Music for Fragments / Music & Birds (Faitiche, 2012)
- PrimeTime (Faitiche, 2012)
- Do You Know Otahiti? (with Masayoshi Fujita; Faitiche, 2013)
- Temple (split with Gesellschaft zur Emanzipation des Samples; Faitiche, 2013)
- Ice Compositions / Miami (with Sarah Morris; En/Of, 2021)

Singles

- "If's, And's and But's" (as The Exposures; ~scape, 2002)
