= The Comet Is Coming =

British jazz-rock band

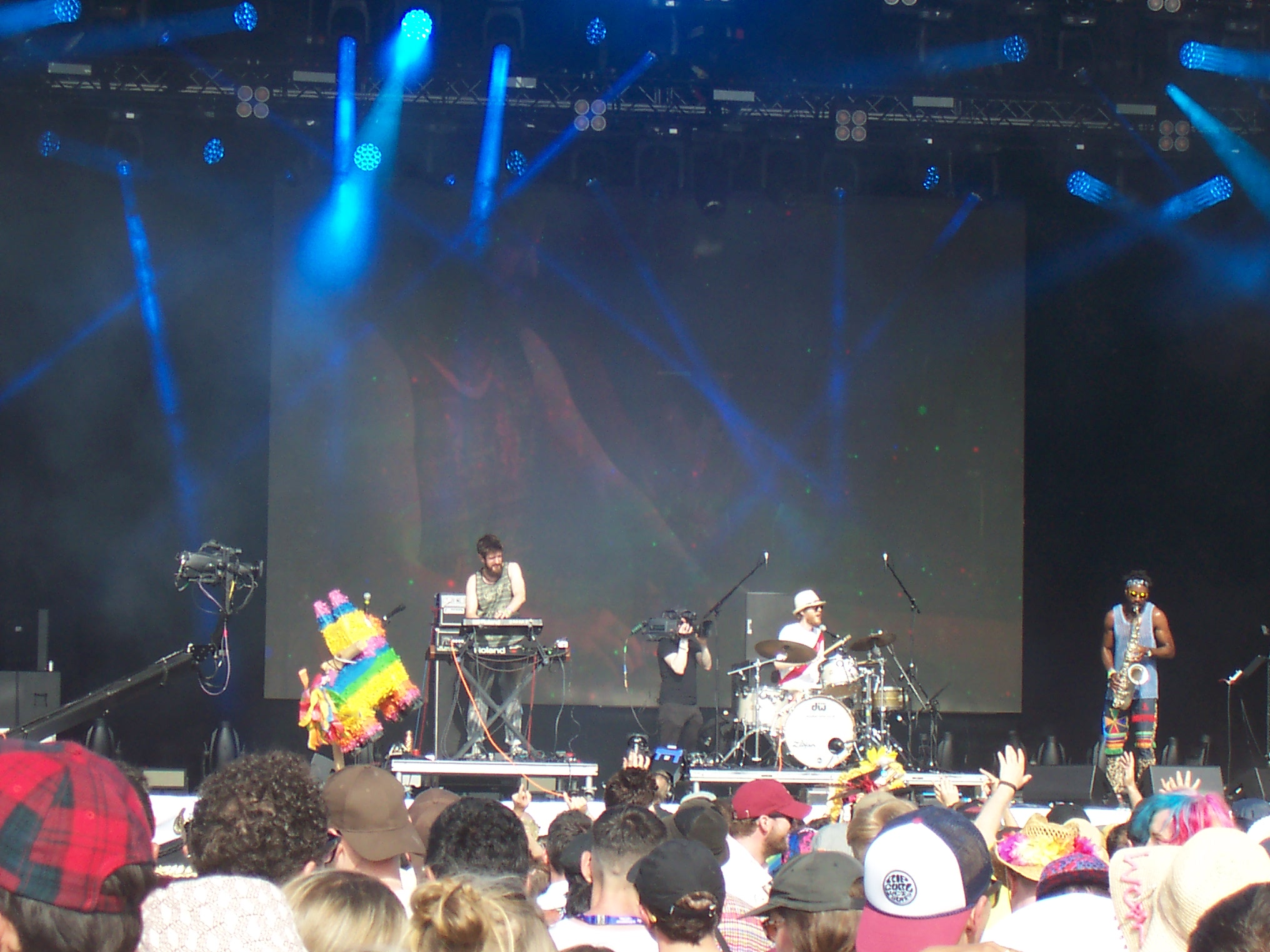
- The Comet Is Coming at Glastonbury 2019

Background information
- Origin: London, United Kingdom
- Genres: Nu jazz, funk rock, psychedelic rock, electronic rock, space rock
- Years active: 2013–2023
- Labels: Impulse!, The Leaf Label
- Past members: Danalogue; Betamax; King Shabaka
- Website: thecometiscoming.co.uk

The Comet Is Coming was a London-based band that incorporated elements of jazz, electronica, funk and psychedelic rock.

The band originally recorded for The Leaf Label, on which their debut EP Prophecy was released, on limited edition 12" vinyl, on 13 November 2015, with the full-length album Channel the Spirits following on 1 April 2016. The album was nominated for the 2016 Mercury Prize, and in 2018 the band signed with Impulse!.

== History ==
The members of the band use the pseudonyms "King Shabaka", "Danalogue", and "Betamax" to respectively refer to saxophonist Shabaka Hutchings, keyboardist Dan Leavers, and drummer Max Hallett.

In a 2013 interview, Hutchings explained the name of the band thus: "The name of the group comes from a BBC Radiophonic Workshop piece of the same name. Once we heard this piece, with its allusions to sci-fi, cosmic remembrances and general space, it instantly struck a chord. We're exploring new sound worlds and aiming to destroy all musical ideals which are unfit for our purposes so the name stuck."

In an interview with M magazine, Betamax spoke of the band's genesis:

Me and Danalogue the Conqueror play as a psychedelic electro synths and live drums duo called Soccer96. We began to notice a tall shadowy figure present at some of our gigs. At some point he appeared at the side of the stage with his sax in hand. When he got up on stage to play with us it created an explosive shockwave of energy that stunned us all. A couple of weeks later King Shabaka rang me up and said 'hey let's make a record' so we booked three days in Total Refreshment Centre studios. It all came together at an incredible speed. We played and recorded to 1/4 tape with no pre-written material. By the end of three days we had recorded hours of music.

The imagery associated with the band is based around outer space, science fiction and B-movies, as can be seen in the music videos for their singles "Neon Baby" and "Do the Milky Way", as well as in song titles and artwork. "Do the Milky Way" premiered on The Quietus. In a feature in The Guardian in April 2016, the group were described as the "true heirs" of cosmic jazz pioneer Sun Ra, and praised for their "fusion of jazz, Afrobeat and electronica in an improvisational, intergalactic mash-up". The Quietus wrote that although the band is "intrinsically linked to funk...and spiritually linked to all manner of cosmic music via their imagery (and love of space-creating echo and reverb effects), The Comet Is Coming has the feel of an utterly fresh sort of project".

King Shabaka elaborates on the cosmic side of the band and the connection to Sun Ra in the same article, when describing the crystal that dominates the cover of their Prophecy EP. He says, "The other thing about the crystal, metaphorically speaking, is the whole Sun Ra thing of creating your own myths. The thing I like that Sun Ra says a lot is the fact that societies that can create their own mythological structures are the ones that have their own agency. To the point at which you can dictate the terms of what's real and what's not real. The crystal in the hand forces you to create your own myth".

In August 2016, the band was nominated for the Mercury Prize for their debut album, Channel the Spirits.

In January 2017 the band was one of the recipients of the Momentum Music Fund through PRS for Music and in April 2017 the band released the Death to the Planet EP through The Leaf Label as part of Record Store Day.

Their second full-length album, Trust in the Lifeforce of the Deep Mystery, was released in March 2019 and received critical acclaim, with The Quietus noting the importance of Sun Ra and Alice Coltrane on their sound while acknowledging that "rather than being weighed down by those legacies, The Comet Is Coming have turned them into fuel, accelerating their sound, and with it, the sound of jazz today." Pitchfork gave the album a score of 7.8 out of 10 and wrote, "Mostly low- to mid-tempo, the band skillfully integrates bleak and radiant tones, leading to an impressive nine-track suite of ambient, spoken-word and grime-infused compositions." The album currently holds a score of 83 on review aggregator Metacritic, indicating "Universal acclaim."

The band was part of the lineup for the 22nd Coachella Valley Music and Arts Festival in April 2023. In June 2023, the band played on the Park stage at Glastonbury Festival. They had intended to play their final show in October of 2023 in Bratislava, but cancelled it "in solidarity with the global call to strike by our Palestinian brothers and sisters who are in the midst of a genocidal assault".

== Band members ==
- Danalogue – keyboards, synthesizer, programming, percussion
- Betamax – drums, percussion, synthesizer
- King Shabaka – saxophones

== Discography ==
=== Albums ===
- Channel the Spirits (2016, The Leaf Label)
- Trust in the Lifeforce of the Deep Mystery (2019, Impulse!)
- Hyper-Dimensional Expansion Beam (2022, Impulse!)

=== EPs ===
- Prophecy (2015)
- Death to the Planet (2017)
- The Afterlife (2019, Impulse!)

=== Singles ===
- "Neon Baby" (2015)
- "Do the Milky Way" (2015)
- "Space Carnival" (2016)
- "Final Eclipse" (2017)
- "Summon the Fire" (2019)
- "Unity" (2019)
- "Lifeforce Part II" (2019)
- "Imminent" (2020)

== Awards and nominations ==
Award Ceremony	Year	Work	Category	Result
Berlin Music Video Awards	2023	TECHNICOLOUR	Best Editor	Nominated
