= Wildbirds & Peacedrums =

Swedish duo

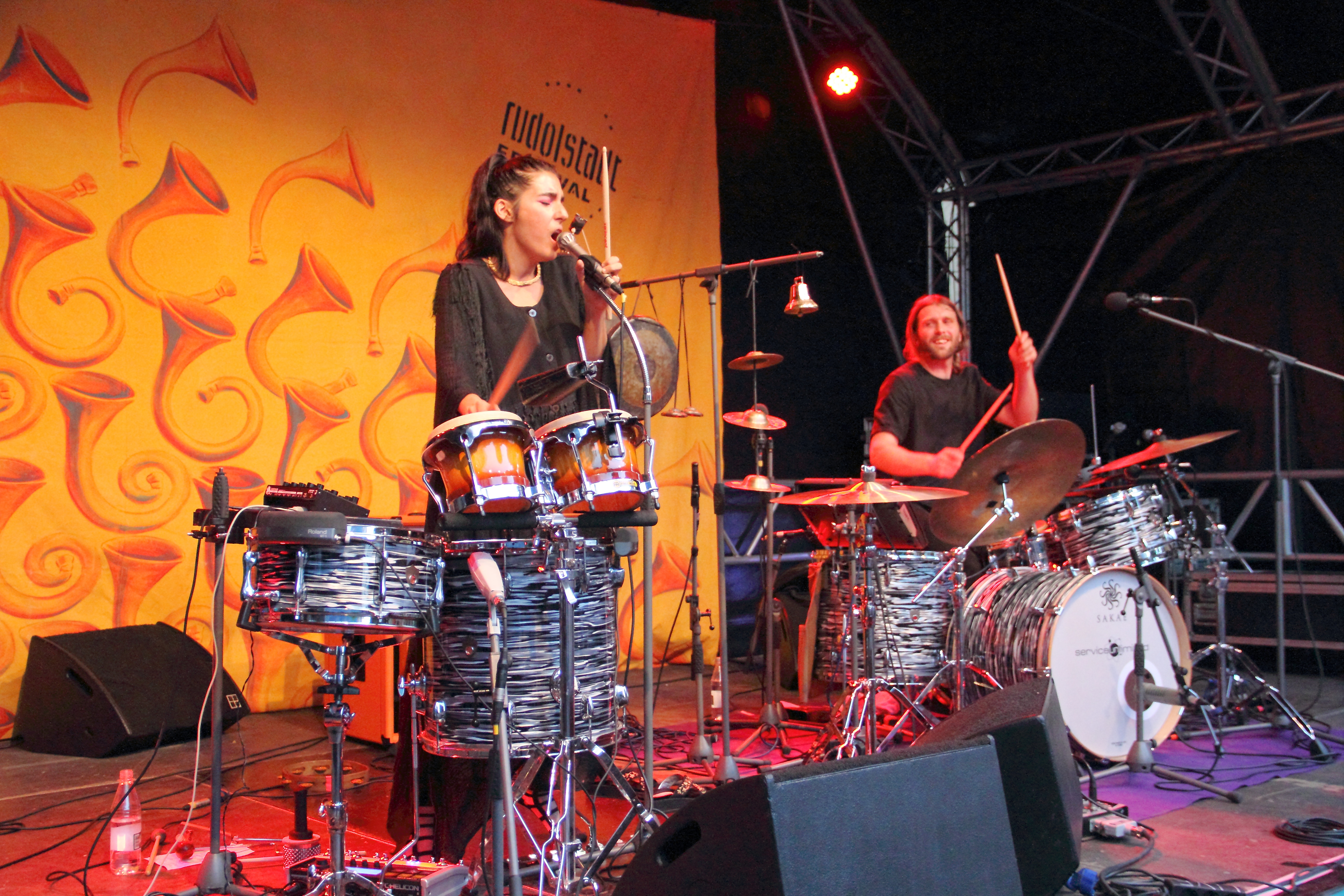
- Wildbirds & Peacedrums performing in 2016 at Rudolstadt-Festival

Background information
- Origin: Gothenburg, Sweden
- Genres: Experimental, psychedelic, blues, pop
- Years active: 2007–present
- Labels: The Leaf Label, Caprice, Found You
- Members: Mariam Wallentin; Andreas Werliin
- Website: Official website

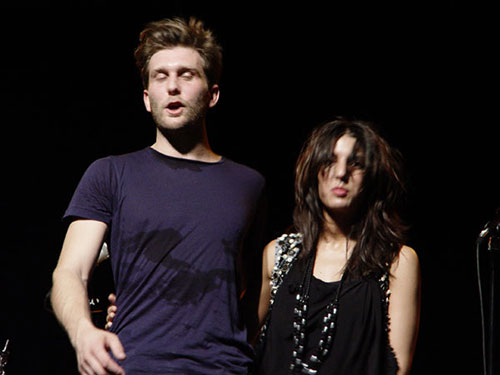
Wildbirds & Peacedrums at Aarhus Festival, Denmark 2009

Wildbirds & Peacedrums is a Swedish duo, Mariam Wallentin and husband Andreas Werliin.

== Background ==
Wallentin and Werliin met in 2004 whilst studying at the Academy of Music and Drama in Gothenburg, Sweden. They married a year later and formed Wildbirds & Peacedrums in 2007. Their music primarily consists of drums, percussion and vocals, with Wallentin also playing the string instrument the cittre, pump-organs and steel-pan on some songs.

The band released their first album Heartcore in 2008, originally through Swedish label Found You Recordings, and later licensed to The Leaf Label for the rest of the world. That year, they were awarded the Årets Jazz i Sverige (Swedish Jazz Act of the Year), which funded the recording of their second album, The Snake, released in 2009.

The band received critical acclaim for their first album, and in the summer of 2008 they undertook their first US tour and performed at several European festivals. They also supported other artists including Deerhoof, Efterklang, Bonnie 'Prince' Billy, Lykke Li and St. Vincent.

In 2010, Wildbirds & Peacedrums travelled to Iceland to record and subsequently released two vinyl EPs: Retina (May 24) and Iris (June 21). Retina featured cellist and arranger Hildur Guðnadóttir and the Schola Cantorum Reykjavík Chamber Choir. These two Eps were later compiled as an album entitled Rivers (released on August 23, 2010).

In a reaction to their busy touring schedule, in 2014 the duo returned to their studio in Stockholm to write, record and produce their fourth album, Rhythm. This record saw Wildbirds & Peacedrums stripping their music back to its roots of voice and percussion.

In 2015, their song "Peeling Off the Layers" from the Rivers album was used as the title music for the Sky Atlantic TV series Fortitude. In the same year, Apple selected the song "There Is No Light", from the 2009 album The Snake, to soundtrack the launch of their new streaming service, Apple Music.

In autumn 2015, as part of their 20th anniversary celebrations, The Leaf Label released the Rivers album on a single LP for the first time. It was initially made available to fans through the PledgeMusic service and entered shops in early 2016.

== Discography ==
=== Albums ===
- Heartcore (2007)
- The Snake (2008)
- Rivers (2010)
- Rhythm (2014)

=== EPs ===
- My Heart (2009)
- Retina (2010)
- Iris (2010)

== Awards ==
- Årets Svensk Jazz (2007)
