= Translate (Luke Abbott album) =

Studio album by Luke Abbott
- Released: November 20, 2020
- Genre: Psychedelia; electronica
- Length: 52:47
- Label: Border Community

Luke Abbott chronology
Music from the Edge of an Island (2019)	Translate (2020)

Professional ratings
Aggregate scores
Source	Rating
AnyDecentMusic?	7.5/10
Metacritic	80/100
Review scores
Source	Rating
Loud and Quiet	8/10
musicOMH	4/5 stars
The Observer	4/5 stars
Pitchfork	6.7/10

Translate is the third studio album by English electronica artist Luke Abbott. It was released on 20 November 2020, via record label Border Community.

== Track listing ==
All tracks are written by Luke Abbott

No.	Title	Length
1.	"Kagen Sound"	3:07
2.	"Our Scene"	5:34
3.	"Flux"	4:25
4.	"Ames Window"	9:25
5.	"Roses"	1:48
6.	"Earthship"	6:54
7.	"Living Dust"	5:05
8.	"River Flow"	2:30
9.	"Feed Me Shapes"	3:22
10.	"Luna"	4:23
11.	"August Prism"	6:41
