= Loop-Finding-Jazz-Records =

Studio album by Jan Jelinek
- Released: 2 February 2001
- Recorded: 2000
- Studio: Jan Jelinek's flat (Berlin)
- Genre: IDM; ambient; glitch
- Length: 51:52
- Label: ~scape
- Producer: Jan Jelinek

Jan Jelinek chronology
Personal Rock (1999)	Loop-Finding-Jazz-Records (2001)	Improvisations and Edits Tokyo, 26 September 2001 (2002)

Singles from Loop-Finding-Jazz-Records
- 1. "Tendency" Released: 3 November 2000

Loop-Finding-Jazz-Records (stylised in all lowercase) is the second studio album by German electronic music producer Jan Jelinek. It was released on 2 February 2001 by the label ~scape.

== Production ==
Jan Jelinek recorded Loop-Finding-Jazz-Records in his Berlin flat in 2000. He produced much of the album using an Ensoniq ASR-10 sampler. Jelinek composed the tracks on Loop-Finding-Jazz-Records around heavily manipulated samples from jazz records, an approach acknowledged in the album's title, though reviews have noted the album bears virtually no resemblance to the jazz genre and "the sounds' origins are barely perceptible".

== Critical reception ==
Professional ratings
Review scores
Source	Rating
AllMusic	4.5/5 stars
Alternative Press	4/5
NME	8/10
Pitchfork	9.3/10
Q	3/5 stars
Resident Advisor	4.7/5
Spectrum Culture	4.5/5 stars

Reviewing Loop-Finding-Jazz-Records for Pitchfork, critic Mark Richardson said that Jelinek distinguishes himself from other glitch artists through his more evident "ear for emotion" on the album, which Richardson credited to "the textures he chooses, which veer toward the liquid and organic", and "the manner in which Jelinek operates." In his review for AllMusic, Richardson highlighted the album's more varied rhythms and "richer sound palette" compared to Jelinek's past work.

In 2017, Pitchfork placed Loop-Finding-Jazz-Records at number seven on its list of the 50 best IDM albums of all time. According to Brian Kolada of Resident Advisor, the album has gone on to be "widely hailed as a highlight of the late-'90s and early-'00s era of minimal and experimental electronic music."

== Track listing ==
All tracks are written by Jan Jelinek

No.	Title	Length
1.	"Moiré (Piano & Organ)"	6:54
2.	"Rock in the Video Age"	8:03
3.	"They, Them"	7:20
4.	"Them, Their"	5:06
5.	"Tendency"	7:21
6.	"Moiré (Strings)"	6:25
7.	"Do Dekor"	5:34
8.	"Drift"	5:09
Total length:		51:52

2017 reissue bonus tracks
No.	Title	Length
9.	"Moiré (Guitar & Horns)"	6:37
10.	"Poren"	6:48
11.	"Audio Liner Notes (The Village Vanguard)"	4:43
Total length:		70:00
