= Jack Ladder =

- Born: Timothy Kenneth Rogers; 6 April 1983 (age 43)
- Origin: Sydney, New South Wales, Australia
- Genres: Rock; art rock; indie rock; new wave; Euthadisco
- Occupations: Musician; songwriter
- Instruments: Vocals; guitar
- Years active: 2005–present
- Labels: Spunk!; Holloweyed
- Website: jackladderandthedreamlanders.com

Timothy Kenneth Rogers (born 6 April 1983), known by his stage name Jack Ladder, is an Australian rock music singer-songwriter, guitarist and composer. His music is characterised by his baritone voice and poignant observations on love and death, often featuring gallows humour.

== Biography ==
Since 2005 Ladder has released five albums: Not Worth Waiting For (Spunk 2005), Love Is Gone (Spunk 2008), Hurtsville (Spunk 2011/Holloweyed 2012) and Playmates (Self Portrait 2014). Love Is Gone was short-listed for the Australian Music Prize, at which it also won the Red Bull Music Award for recognition of outstanding potential. It was also selected as Album of the Year by Who magazine.

In 2011 Ladder released Hurtsville with The Dreamlanders (Kirin J. Callinan, Donny Benét and Laurence Pike). Following its release he was nominated in The Age (Melbourne) EG Music Awards in multiple categories, including Best Male Artist, Best Song and Best Album. The lead single, "Cold Feet", was crowned "Song of the Year" by leading Australian music site Mess & Noise, and Hurtsville was short-listed for the Australian Music Prize.

Hurtsville was released in North America via the Holloweyed label and in Germany/BENELUX via Skycap in 2012. Inpress praised the record, deeming it "honest, rich & like nothing else". Beat magazine said that "Ladder continues to thrill, frustrated and intrigue" with the album. The Age called it "A terrifying wasp-factory novella of disgust", while Vice rated the album 9 out of 10 and said it "Tak[es] subversion to another level". Time Out rated it 5 out of 5 stars.

On 28 June 2021, Jack Ladder and The Dreamlanders announced sixth studio album Hijack! and released lead single "Astronaut".

=== Tours and live performances ===
Jack Ladder has performed throughout Australia since 2005, playing capitals and regional centres on national tours to support all three albums, in 2005, 2008, 2011 and in 2012 to support the shortlisting of Hurtsville for the Australian Music Prize. He has appeared at music festivals such as Laneway, Peats Ridge Festival and the Meredith Music Festival. He has also performed internationally, making appearances in London, Berlin, New York and Los Angeles. Ladder has shared stages with John Cale, The Horrors, Bill Callahan and Okkervil River, for whom he contributed to The Stand Ins project. He also features on the live Bill Callahan record Rough Travel for a Rare Thing (Drag City 2010), playing bass guitar on the single, "Rough Travel for a Rare Thing".

Ladder has appeared on the Fox breakfast show Good Day New York in 2008, performing "You Won't Be Forgotten (When You Leave)", and in 2009 on Australian celebrity music quiz show Rockwiz, performing "The Barber's Son". His song "Two Clocks" appears in the season finale of Australian crime drama Underbelly, and in 2011 Ladder recorded his own version of "The 12 Days of Christmas" for Australian underwear manufacturer Bonds.

In 2012 Jack Ladder composed the soundtrack, and curated forgotten 1960s and 1970s music, for a sketch horror show titled Watch With Mother, created for tablet computers, which was the first of its genre. It was available as an app and serialized show via the iTunes Store and Google Play.

== Discography ==
Title	Album details	Peak chart positions
Title	Album details	AUS Hitseekers
Not Worth Waiting For	Release date: 2005; Label: Formats: CD, digital download	—
Love Is Gone	Release date: 2008; Label: Spunk! (URA257); Formats: CD, digital download	—
Hurtsville (with The Dreamlanders)	Release date: 6 June 2011; Label: Spunk/EMI Records (URA3520); Formats: CD, digital download, vinyl	9
Playmates (with The Dreamlanders)	Release date: 3 November 2014; Label: Sub/Independent (SP001CD); Formats: CD, digital download, vinyl	3
Blue Poles (with The Dreamlanders)	Release date: 7 May 2018; Label: Independent (BARELY017CD); Formats: Cassette, CD, digital download, vinyl	3
Hijack! (with The Dreamlanders)	Release date: 10 September 2021; Label: Endless Recordings; Formats: CD, digital download, vinyl	—
Tall Pop Syndrome	Release Date: 14 July 2023; Label: Endless; Formats: CD, digital download, vinyl	—

== Awards ==
=== Australian Music Prize ===
The Australian Music Prize (the AMP) is an annual award of $30,000 given to an Australian band or solo artist in recognition of the merit of an album released during the year of award. The AMP commenced in 2005.

Year	Nominee / work	Award	Result
2008	Love Is Gone	Australian Music Prize	Nominated

=== APRA Music Awards ===
Year	Nominee / work	Award	Result
APRA Music Awards of 2019	"Tell It Like It Is"	Blues & Roots Work of the Year	Nominated
APRA Music Awards of 2019	"White Flag"	Blues & Roots Work of the Year	Nominated

=== National Live Music Awards ===
The National Live Music Awards (NLMAs) are a broad recognition of Australia's diverse live industry, celebrating the success of the Australian live scene. The awards commenced in 2016.

Year	Nominee / work	Award	Result
National Live Music Awards of 2016	Donny Benét (Jack Ladder & The Dreamlanders)	Live Bassist of the Year	Won
