= Kūchū Camp =

Studio album by Fishmans
- Released: February 1, 1996
- Recorded: July – November 1995
- Studio: Waikiki Beach
- Genres: Dream pop, dub, neo-psychedelia
- Length: 45:42
- Label: Polydor Records
- Producer: Fishmans

Fishmans chronology
Oh! Mountain (1995)	Kūchū Camp (1996)	Long Season (1996)

Kūchū Camp (Japanese: 空中キャンプ, lit. Aerial Camp) alternatively titled Something in the Air, is the fifth studio album by Japanese band Fishmans, released on February 1, 1996 on Polydor Records. The album was the band's most notable change in style, leading into a more psychedelic and dream pop sound while still retaining their earlier dub roots.

Kūchū Camp was the first studio album to introduce their new supporting multi-instrumentalist member Honzi, who would go on playing with the band until her death in 2007. In September 2007, Rolling Stone Japan ranked Kuchu Camp No.8 on its list of the "100 Greatest Japanese Rock Albums of All Time".

== Background ==
In 1995, Fishmans signed a contract with Polydor Records. Following this, producer ZAK approached the band's new director, Toshiya Sano, with a request to create albums at their own pace, which would require their own studio. Fishmans secured their studio on the condition that they would produce three albums within two years.

By July 1995, Fishmans began rehearsals for Kūchū Camp. However by September 19, Hakase had left the band citing a desire to focus on his own music. Since many of the songs had been written with him in mind, his departure required adjustments to the album's creative direction. With Kensuke Ojima also having left a year prior, This reduced the band from having five members to three. Despite these changes, the band continued their work with a renewed focus, bringing in supporting musicians such as violinist and keyboardist Honzi, and guitarist Shinya Kogure from Hicksville to fill the role left by Hakase.

== Track listing ==
No.	Title	Length
1.	"ずっと前" (Zutto Mae; Long Before)	4:58
2.	"Baby Blue"	6:07
3.	"Slow Days"	4:40
4.	"Sunny Blue"	5:53
5.	"ナイトクルージング" (Night Cruising)	6:00
6.	"幸せ者" (Shiawase-mono; A Happy Person)	4:36
7.	"すばらしくてNice Choice" (Subarashikute Nice Choice; A Wonderful and Nice Choice)	6:45
8.	"新しい人" (Atarashii Hito; A New Person)	6:43
Total length:		45:42

== Personnel ==
Main Artists

- Shinji Sato – Voice, Guitar, Composition
- Yuzuru Kashiwabara – Bass, Chorus
- Kin-Ichi Motegi – Drums, Chorus

Guest musicians

- Honzi – Keyboard, Violin, Chorus
- Shinya Kogure – Guitar, Chorus
- Sugar Yoshinaga – Guitar on "Slow Days"
- Tadashi Ueda – Piano on "すばらしくてNice Choice"

Mixing and others

- ZAK – Producer, Mixing Engineer, Recording Engineer, Programming
- Tak – Recording Engineer
- Phonic – Design, Art Direction
- Mariko Yamamoto – Design, Art Direction
- Moog Yamamoto – Design, Art Direction, Photography
- Tohru Kotetsu – Cutting Engineer
- Tsutomo Okada – Assistant Engineer
- Kazuo Saimoto – assistant Engineer
- Yuka Koizumi – mastering Engineer
- Toshiya Sano – A&R
- Masaki Morimoto – A&R
- Naoko Nozawa – Artist Promotion
- Shuji Kudoh – Artist Promotion
- Ichiro Asatsuma – Executive Producer
- Yoshiyuki Okuda – Executive Producer
- Tadataka Watanabe – Executive Producer
- Kokoro Moriguchi – Management Staff
- Akiko Ueta – Management Staff
- Mitsuteru Takasugi – Equipment
- Takeshi Umezawa – Equipment
- Pardon Kimura – Interior Coordination of Hawaii Studio (Wakiki Beach)
- Ayako Mogi – Photography
- Keiji Ito – Graffiti
- Friends – Photography

== Charts ==
Chart	Peak position
Japanese Album (Oricon)	46
