= Snapped Ankles =

London-based post-punk band

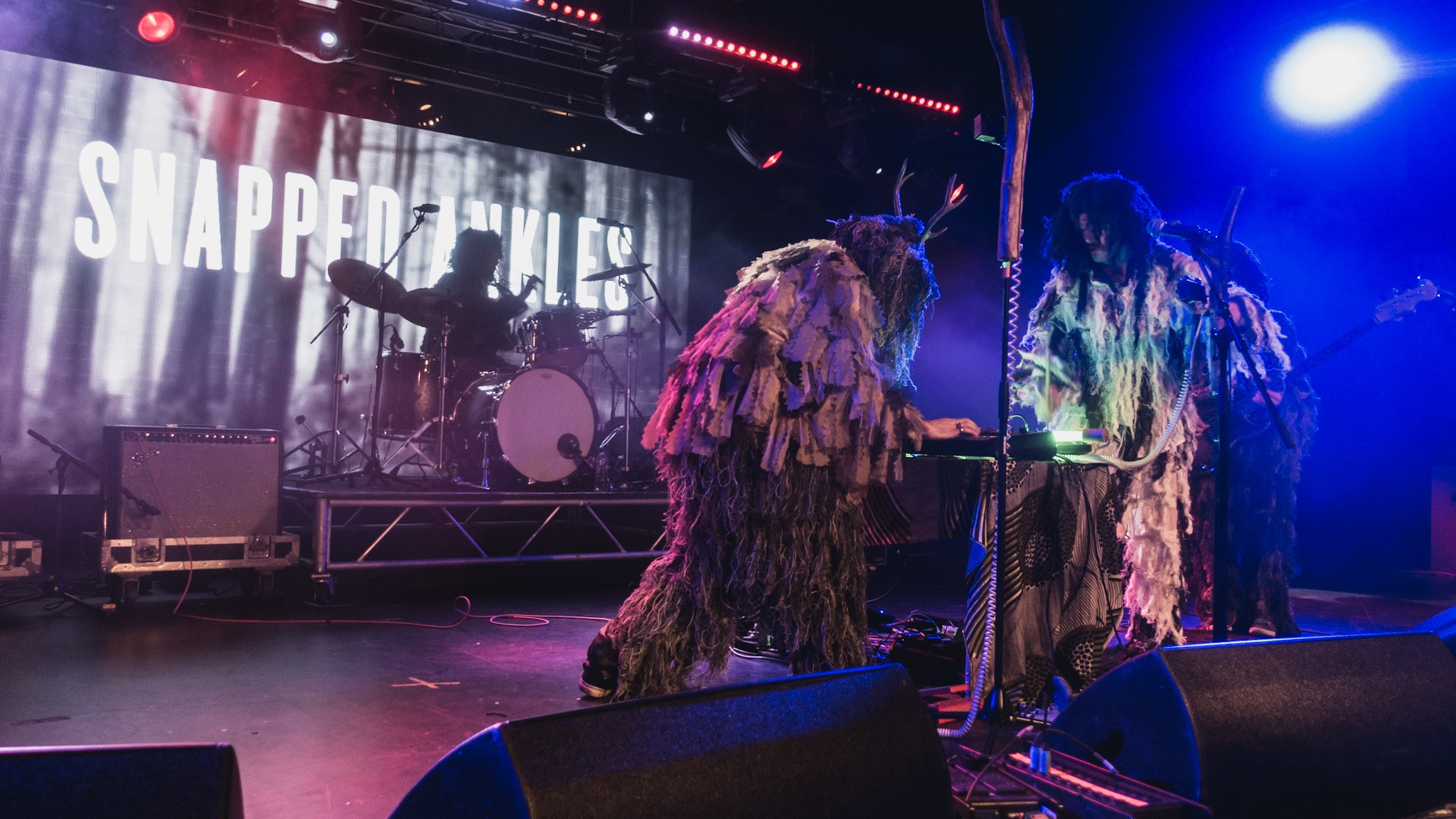
- Rockaway Beach- Snapped Ankles (2018)

Background information
- Origin: London, England
- Genres: Post-punk, electronica, punk, Krautrock
- Years active: 2011–present
- Labels: The Leaf Label
- Website: http://www.snappedankles.com

Snapped Ankles are an English, London-based post-punk band, incorporating elements of performance art and art rock. They signed to The Leaf Label in 2017 and have released five albums, two EPs and numerous singles to date. The band members' identities are unknown, due to the fact that the group performs in ghillie suits, but they claim to be "forest folk...descended from the trees".

== History ==
Formed in East London in 2011, the band began performing at DIY nights creating live improvisations by chopping up 1960s films before sequencing and augmenting them with synthesisers. The band released their first single, "True Ecology (Shit Everywhere)", in December 2012, on Ears Have Eyes records. Their next release came in early 2015 with "I Want My Minutes Back", issued on white label, and reissued in 2017 as their first release on The Leaf Label. From 2015 to 2016, they performed in Daniel Oliver's participatory performance show 'Weird Seance'. In May 2017, they performed a live session on Marc Riley's BBC 6 Music show.

The group's first release specifically for The Leaf Label, 12-inch EP The Best Light Is The Last Light, was released in June 2017, with debut album Come Play the Trees following that September. The Quietus described the album as "propulsive and angular", praised it as "the embodiment of the weird, wonderful and true ecology of it all, presented by a bunch of folks dressed like ditches" and compared the band to "a pagan Can or a forested Fall". Loud and Quiet describe the album as "hyperactive post-punk for the ailing state of the nation" and "bounding forward uncannily like The Fall's recent work". In December 2017, Electronic Sounds placed the album at number 9 in their top 30 albums of the year and The Quietus at 14 in their list of 100.

Snapped Ankles released Violations, an EP of cover versions, for Record Store Day 2018. It was released on limited edition vinyl and featured songs by The Fugs, Can, Joey Beltram and The Comateens. Their second album Stunning Luxury was released on The Leaf Label on 1 March 2019. Described as a "10-song Gang of Four style takedown of modern capitalism" and "a stridently political album that loses neither its sense of humour nor its capacity for bangers", the album's themes and settings are based in the city and suburbs rather than the forests of 2017's Come Play The Trees. The album's lyrics attacks gentrification and other aspects of modern city life. The Quietus placed the album at #16 in their Albums Of The Year 2019.

The band's first live album, 21 Metres to Hebden Bridge, was released in September 2020. Named after the distance between the pool table and stage at The Trades Club in Hebden Bridge, where it was recorded in October 2019, the album was released for the delayed Record Store Day 2020.

Snapped Ankles' third studio album, Forest Of Your Problems, was released on The Leaf Label in July 2021. It was Rough Trade's Album of the Month, and they described it as the group's "most spellbinding potion of woodwose krautrock to date" and a "bewitching and hypnotic incantation with swirling melodies, primal rhythm and feral funk that harks back to the feeling of possessed mania of Can or Joy Division." Loud and Quiet gave the album 8/10 and described it as a "Goat-meets-The Fall soundworld that perfectly captures the group’s psychotic, eerie vision".

Hard Times Furious Dancing, the band's fifth studio album, was released on The Leaf Label on 28th March 2025.

== Music, imagery and live performance ==
The band perform in "shamanistic costumes" and their live performances include elements of performance art and art-rock. Their unique live show is known for "whipping audiences into a manic, frenzied, ecstatic state."

The Leaf Label describes the band's sound as "primal motoric rhythms, the rush of white noise and post-punk angles; an aural onslaught played out on homemade log synths, electrified guitars and sticks beating hell on taut animal skin". The Quietus called them "a band defying convention at every turn and toying with their own mythology as they see fit".

In the same article, the band describe Come Play The Trees as "[having] a bunch poppy, post-punk groove tracks, but then we've got some songs that are made just using the single oscillator log-synths. They're sort of non-songs". They go on to say, "when you've got an instrument that can only make one note, long or short, and barely make a tune at all, it feels like a political statement about going back to these situations where we had to be based in places that barely had locks on the doors and where we were using PAs and drums kids made out of bits that we cobbled together. That's what I like to see in a band. I want to see bands that have thrown it together, rather than having all the new gear from Denmark Street".

The band also cites the diverse influences of Morris dancing, Old Norse texts, Jean-Luc Godard, Lightning Bolt, Fela Kuti and London warehouse parties.

== Discography ==
=== Albums ===
- Come Play the Trees (The Leaf Label, 2017)
- Stunning Luxury (The Leaf Label, 2019)
- 21 Metres from Hebden Bridge (The Leaf Label, 2020; RSD 2020 leaf green vinyl limited edition)
- Forest of Your Problems (The Leaf Label, 2021)
- Hard Times Furious Dancing (The Leaf Label, 2025)

=== EPs ===
- True Ecology (Ears Have Eyes, 2012)
- The Best Light Is the Last Light (The Leaf Label, 2017)
- Violations (The Leaf Label, 2018)
- Four to the Forest Floor (The Leaf Label, 2018)

=== Singles ===
- "I Want My Minutes Back" (The Leaf Label, 2017)
- "The Invisible Real That Hurts (Danalogue Dirty Orbit Mix)" (The Leaf Label, 2017)
- "CIA Man (NSA Man Violation)" (The Leaf Label, 2018)
- "Drink and Glide" (The Leaf Label, 2019)
- "Rechargeable" (The Leaf Label, 2019)
- "Letter from Hampi Mountain" (The Leaf Label, 2019)
- "Rhythm Is Our Business" (The Leaf Label, 2021)
- "The Evidence" (The Leaf Label, 2021)
- "Shifting Basslines of the Cornucopians" (The Leaf Label, 2021)
- "Raoul" (The Leaf Label, 2025)
- "Pay the Rent" (The Leaf Label, 2025)
