= Asa-Chang & Junray =

Japanese avant-garde band

ASA-CHANG & Junray
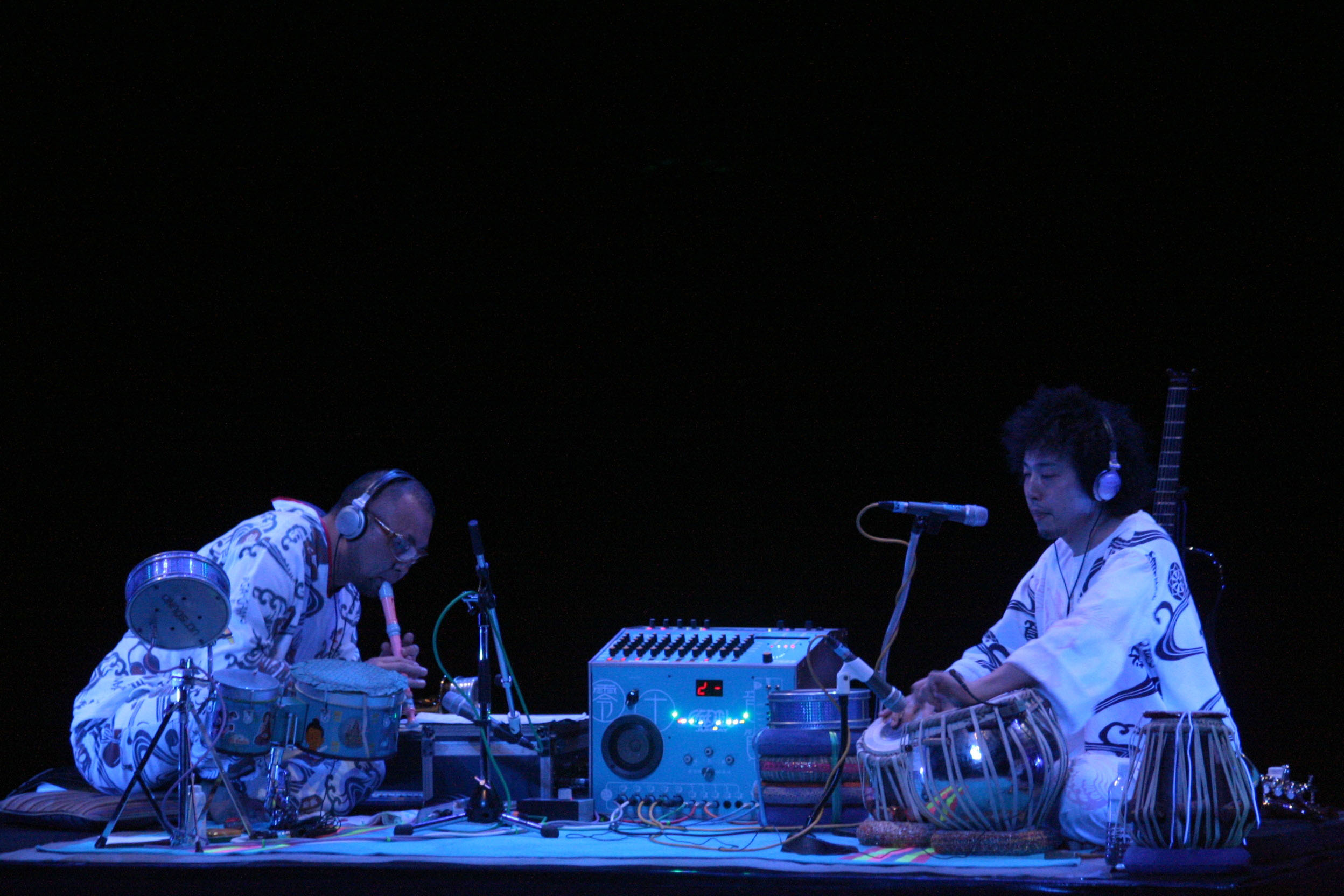
- ASA-CHANG & Junray

Background information
- Origin: Tokyo, Japan
- Genres: Avant-garde; electronic; percussive music
- Years active: 1998–present
- Labels: The Leaf Label, Oon Music Inc
- Members: ASA-CHANG; Yoshihiro Goseki; Anzu Suhara
- Past members: Hidehiko Urayama; U-zhaan
- Website: www.junray.com

ASA-CHANG & Junray is a band founded by Japanese percussionist ASA-CHANG, who was the founder and original bandmaster of Tokyo Ska Paradise Orchestra. After leaving the group in 1993, he formed ASA-CHANG & Junray in 1998 with programmer and guitarist Hidehiko Urayama. They were joined in 2000 by tabla player U-zhaan. Live, the group used a portable sound-system called 'Jun-Ray Tronics', hence the name; the word 'junray', however, also means 'pilgrimage'.

In 2002, the British label The Leaf Label released Jun Ray Song Chang, which compiled the group's first two Japan-only albums. It was followed a year later by the mini album Tsu Gi Ne Pu. The group's song 'Hana' was featured on Fabric Live 07, while 'Tsuginepu To Ittemita' was included on a The Wire Tapper CD. The group's 2005 album, Minna no Junray, featured vocals by singer and actress Kyōko Koizumi.

On March 31, 2010, Urayama and U-zhaan left the band.

In 2012, saxophone flute player Yoshihiro Goseki and violinist Anzu Suhara joined as live members.

In 2013, their song "Hana" was re-done and used as the ending theme for the anime adaptation of Shuzo Oshimi's The Flowers of Evil. Several versions, including the original, are used throughout the series.

== Members ==
- ASA-CHANG (Hirokazu Asakura, ex. Tokyo Ska Paradise Orchestra): percussion, tablabongo
- Yoshihiro Goseki (ex. DCPRG, ex. Zainichi Funk): sax, flute, vocal
- Anzu Suhara (ex. Led Act Sect): violin, guitar, vocal

=== Former members ===
- Hidehiko Urayama: guitar, music sequencer
- U-zhaan: tabla

== Albums ==
- Tabla Magma Bongo, 1998 (Japan only)
- Hana, 2001 (Japan only)
- Jun Ray Song Chang, The Leaf Label 2002
- Tsu Gi Ne Pu, The Leaf Label 2003 (BBC review)
- Minna no Junray, 2005
- Kage No Nai Hito, 2009
- Mahou, 2016
- 事件, 2020
