= The Leaf Label =

British independent record label

- Founded: 1994
- Founder: Tony Morley; Julian Carrera
- Genre: Various
- Country of origin: UK
- Location: Leeds, Yorkshire, England
- Official website: www.theleaflabel.com

The Leaf Label is a British independent record label based in Yorkshire, England. Initially an electronic music label, releasing mainly instrumental music, the company's approach now features artists spanning jazz and post-punk.

== History ==
The Leaf Label was created in late 1994 by Tony Morley; at that time, press officer at 4AD in London, along with his friend Julian Carrera, then working for music press company Stone Immaculate. The pair ran the label as a hobby until the end of 1996, during which time they released a series of eight 12" singles, of mainly electronic music. The label debuted in early 1995 with a 12" release by Boymerang, a project by Graham Sutton of the post-rock band Bark Psychosis, and early releases also included two volumes of the 'Invisible Soundtracks' series of EPs. Following his recovery from a serious road accident in 1995, Morley decided to leave 4AD at the end of 1996, setting up his own independent promo company, No9, and parting company with Carrera around the same time. The company's first office was in Battersea in South West London, later moving to larger premises in Brixton, South London.

The label's first album release was 1997's Silence FM by The Sons Of Silence, a group which consisted of members of O Yuki Conjugate (OYC). OYC also spawned the label's second artist album release, by A Small Good Thing. The label followed these releases with key artist album releases by Faultline, Susumu Yokota, Eardrum and 310 in the late 1990s. Yokota's ambient albums, licensed from his own Skintone label in Japan, remain some of the label's most successful releases.

In 1999, Morley set up the PostEverything mail order operation with Colin Newman (from the band Wire) and web designer Dorian Moore. Morley resigned as a director of the company in 2005, and the site closed in 2008.

The label's first real success of the 2000s came with Dan Snaith's Manitoba, who released two albums under that name in 2001 (Start Breaking My Heart) and 2003 (Up In Flames). Following a lawsuit by Richard "Handsome Dick" Manitoba of The Dictators, Snaith was obliged to change his artist name, and subsequently became known as Caribou, with his third album, The Milk of Human Kindness, released under that name in 2005.

The label followed the success of Manitoba with a run of debut albums by Murcof, Boom Bip & Doseone and Asa-Chang & Junray in 2002, Colleen in 2003, and A Hawk and a Hacksaw, Psapp and Efterklang in 2004. The label celebrated its tenth anniversary with a week of events in London in October 2005, along with the retrospective 2CD compilation Check The Water.

The company relocated to Horsforth in West Yorkshire in the spring of 2006. Significant releases since then have included Vladislav Delay, Nancy Elizabeth, Oh No Ono, Melt Yourself Down, Wildbirds & Peacedrums and Polar Bear, whose album In Each and Every One was nominated for the 2014 Mercury Prize.

The label moved office again in September 2010 to its current premises, also in Horsforth. The company now also manages a number of artists, and Morley sources music for the Velvet Ears music library, owned by music supervisor Liz Gallacher.

In the autumn of 2015, The Leaf Label celebrated its 20th anniversary with a limited edition box set, vinyl re-issues and a series of concerts in Leeds and London, under the umbrella of 'Leaf 20'. Limited to only 300 copies, The Leaf 20 box set was made available to fans through the PledgeMusic service.

In 2016 Channel the Spirits by The Comet Is Coming was shortlisted for the Mercury Prize as well as making Best Albums Of 2016 lists in Time Out New York, The Quietus, Uncut and Mojo.

The label continued to release from Szun Waves, Warmduscher, Keeley Forsyth, Craven Faults and Sarathy Korwar. Warmduscher's Tainted Lunch came in at number 6 in BBC Radio 6 Music Albums Of The Year 2019 and the (delayed) Record Store Day 2020 saw special releases from Warmduscher, Sarathy Korwar and Snapped Ankles. Debris by Keeley Forsyth, Erratics & Unconformities by Craven Faults and People On Sunday by Domenique Dumont made numerous Album Of The Year lists in 2020, including The Quietus, AllMusic, Rough Trade and Norman Records.

Recent years have seen further critically acclaimed releases from Snapped Ankles, Nightports, Keeley Forsyth, Craven Faults and Sarathy Korwar. In September 2022 the label signed the group Decius. Their 2022 debut album Decius Vol. I was placed at number five in The Quietus Albums Of The Year 2022. 2025 saw the label sign The Sick Man of Europe and the release of their Moderate Air Quality EP and eponymous debut album.

== Artists ==
- 310
- A Hawk And A Hacksaw
- A Small Good Thing
- Adrian Klumpes
- Asa-Chang & Junray
- AU
- Beige
- Bill Wells
- Black Helicopters
- Boom Bip & Doseone
- Boymerang
- Caribou (formerly Manitoba)
- Clue to Kalo
- Colleen
- Craven Faults
- Decal
- Decius
- Domenique Dumont
- Eardrum
- Efterklang
- Essie Jain
- Faultline
- Four Tet
- Gorodisch
- Gripper
- Hanne Hukkelberg
- Icarus
- Icy Demons
- Jherek Bischoff
- Julia Kent
- Keeley Forsyth
- Luger
- LWW
- Laurence Pike
- Matthew Bourne
- Melt Yourself Down
- Murcof
- Nancy Elizabeth
- Nightports
- Oh No Ono
- Phelan Sheppard
- Polar Bear (British band)
- Psapp
- Riow Arai
- Rob Ellis
- Roll The Dice
- Sarathy Korwar
- Si Begg
- Sofa Surfers
- Snapped Ankles
- Susumu Yokota
- Sutekh
- Szun Waves
- The Comet Is Coming
- The Sick Man of Europe
- The Sons of Silence
- Triosk
- Vladislav Delay
- volcano!
- Warmduscher
- Wildbirds & Peacedrums
- Witchman

== See also ==
- List of record labels
- List of independent UK record labels
