= London Brew =

Studio album by London Brew
- Released: 31 March 2023
- Recorded: 6–9 December 2020
- Studios: The Church Studios, Crouch End, North London
- Genre: Jazz fusion
- Length: 88:15
- Label: Concord Jazz
- Producer: Martin Terefe

Singles from London Brew
- 1. "Miles Chases New Voodoo in the Church" Released: 19 January 2023; 2. "Raven Flies Low" Released: 9 March 2023

London Brew is the debut album by London Brew, a band consisting of a dozen British jazz musicians including Nubya Garcia, BBC Radio 1 presenter Benji B, and multiple members of Sons of Kemet and the Invisible. The album was released on 31 March 2023.

== Background and recording ==
The band was assembled by producer and guitarist Martin Terefe and executive producer Bruce Lampcov for a series of concerts in major cities across Europe, starting with one at the Barbican Centre celebrating the 50th anniversary of Miles Davis' Bitches Brew which was cancelled due to the COVID-19 pandemic.

In place of the concert, the group assembled at the Church Studios in North London in December 2020, starting five days after the end of the UK's second COVID-19 lockdown, to record the album, an improvised set inspired by Bitches Brew. The recording took place over three days. The process started with pre-production work by Terefe and the Invisible's Dave Okumu, which Okumu described as Terefe sharing "a vision rooted in inspiration and celebration rather than faithful recreation". Benji B was brought in to feed Terefe's and Okumu's initial sketches to the ensemble. Okumu said the recording process was full of "so many special moments" such as "Shabaka and Nubya speaking to each other through their horns or Theon Cross dropping the heaviest bass line this side of lockdown."

Terefe, left with over 12 hours of material from the sessions, said he mixed them "like a non-jazz record" with "no editing at all, except deciding where to start and end a song", a decision he considered "the least conventional thing to do". Terefe called the results a "new piece of music that taps into Miles's mindset at the time and our emotion of having been through the pandemic", and said "calling the album 'Inspired by Bitches Brew' comes the closest" to explaining it.

== Release ==
The album was announced 19 January 2023 along with the release of lead single "Miles Chases New Voodoo in the Church", an interpretation of Davis' Jimi Hendrix-inspired "Miles Runs the Voodoo Down", and was released by Concord Jazz on 31 March. The second single, "Raven Flies Low", was released 9 March. It is said to match "rugged funk aspects in the beat to glorious melodies wrought from the effects-laden violin of Raven Bush." Terefe said that in mixing the track, he "fell into focusing on the continuous flow [of] Raven's violin melodies and electronic pedal orchestrations. His mini compositions moved so brilliantly under the radar and this one blew my mind. I chose the title inspired by the track 'John McLaughlin' on Bitches Brew. Simply a hats off to a maestro at work."

== Reception ==
London Brew ratings
Aggregate scores
Source	Rating
Metacritic	84/100
Review scores
Source	Rating
AllMusic	4/5 stars
Mojo	4/5 stars
Sputnikmusic	3.5/5
Uncut	4.5/5 stars

According to the review aggregator Metacritic, London Brew received "universal acclaim" based on a weighted average score of 84 out of 100 from 6 critic scores.

=== Year-end lists ===
London Brew on year-end lists
Publication	#	Ref.
BrooklynVegan (Jazz Albums)	—N/a	
Uncut	51	

== Track listing ==
London Brew track listing
No.	Title	Length
1.	"London Brew"	23:34
2.	"London Brew Pt.2 – Trainlines"	15:47
3.	"Miles Chases New Voodoo in the Church"	7:27
4.	"Nu Sha Ni Sha Nu Oss Ra"	8:54
5.	"It's One of These"	6:54
6.	"Bassics"	2:50
7.	"Mor Ning Prayers"	9:52
8.	"Raven Flies Low"	12:57
Total length:		88:15

== Personnel ==
Sourced from JamBase.

- Martin Terefe – producer, mixing engineer, guitarist
- Bruce Lampcov – executive producer
- Dilip Harris - recording engineer
- Nubya Garcia – saxophone, flute
- Shabaka Hutchings – saxophone, woodwinds
- Tom Skinner – drums, percussion
- Benji B – decks, sonic recycling
- Theon Cross – tuba
- Raven Bush – violin, electronics
- Tom Herbert – electric bass, double bass
- Nikolaj Torp Larsen – synthesisers, melodica
- Nick Ramm – piano, synthesizers
- Dan See – drums, percussion
- Dave Okumu – guitar
- Glen Scott
- Lucinda Chao

== Charts ==
Chart performance for London Brew
Chart (2023)	Peak position
Scottish Albums (Official Charts)	42
UK Jazz & Blues Albums (Official Charts)	2
