= Eddie Hick =

English jazz musician (born 1987)

Edward Wakili-Hick
- Also known as: Eddie Hick; Natcyet Wakili
- Born: 1987 (age 38–39)
- Genres: Jazz
- Occupations: Musician, Producer, songwriter
- Instrument: Drums
- Label: Spitfire Audio

Edward Wakili-Hick (also Eddie Hick and Natcyet Wakili) is an English drummer, percussionist, record producer and composer. He is known for his performances with music bands and individual artistes like the Sons of Kemet, Nubya Garcia, Kokoroko and Ezra Collective. In 2022, he released an album from his project, the Nok Cultural Ensemble, Njhyi.

== Career ==
In 2007, Wakili-Hick was one of the founding members of Ariya Astrobeat Arkestra. In 2009, Wakili-Hick joined Gilad Atzmon & the Orient House Ensemble. In 2017, he became one of the founders of the Steam Down collective alongside Ahnanse, poet Brother Portrait, Nadeem Din-Gabisi and later Wakili-Hick joined Sons of Kemet. In 2022, he started the Nok Cultural Ensemble alongside Onome Edgeworth (from Kokoroko), Dwayne Kilvington (AKA Wonky Logic) and Joseph Deenmamode (AKA Mo Kolours). The ensemble is named after the ancient Nok culture.

== Discography ==
=== As leader/co-leader ===
- Ariya Astrobeat Arkestra (Ariya Astrobeat Arkestra, 2010)
- Njhyi Nok Ensemble (SA, 2022)

=== On drums ===
- The Tide has changed Gilad Atzmon & the Orient House Ensemble (World Village, 2010)
- Sine Qua Non – Serge Gainsbourg Reimagined Gilad Atzmon & the Orient House Ensemble (Coup Perdu, 2013)
- Sine Qua Non (Midem Cannes February 2014) Gilad Atzmon & the Orient House Ensemble (Coup Perdu, 2014)
- Caribbean Roots Anthony Joseph (Strut, 2016)
- Ikwunga – Dibia (Rebisi Hut & Dele Sosimi Music], 2016)
- Your Queen Is A Reptile –Sons of Kemet (Impulse! Records, 2016)
- The RE:ensemble – Easter EP – Ashley Henry (Sony Music]], 2018)
- Where Are Your Branches? – Oscar Jerome (2018)
- Uniting of Opposites – Ancient Lights (Tru Thoughts]], 2018)
- Trudi's Songbook: Volume One & Two – Ruby Rushton (22a, 2019)
- Honey For Wounds – Ego Ella May (UpperRoom Records, 2020)
- Beyond The Dome Marcus Joseph (Jazz Refreshed, 2021)
- Live at Real World Studios Nala Sinephro With Edward Wakili-Hick & Dwayne Kilvington (NTS, 2021)

=== Writing / arranging ===
- Anthony Joseph – Caribbean Roots (Strut, 2016)
- IG Culture Presents LCSM – Earthbound (Super-Sonic Jazz, 2020)
- Chelsea Carmichael – The River Doesn't Like Strangers – Earthbound (Native Rebel, 2022)
