= Voices of Bishara =

2022 studio album by Tom Skinner

Studio album by Tom Skinner
- Released: 4 November 2022
- Genre: Jazz
- Length: 27:29
- Label: Nonesuch; International Anthem; Brownswood
- Producer: Tom Skinner

Tom Skinner chronology
Watermelon Sun (as Hello Skinny) (2017)	Voices of Bishara (2022)	Voices of Bishara Live at "Mu" (2024)

Singles from Voices of Bishara
- 1. "Bishara" Released: 7 September 2022; 2. "The Journey" Released: 18 October 2022

Voices of Bishara is a studio album by the English drummer Tom Skinner, released on 4 November 2022 by via Nonesuch Records, International Anthem Recording Company, and Brownswood Recordings. It was ranked among the best jazz albums of 2022 by multiple critics.

== Background ==
Voices of Bishara is Skinner's first solo album under his real name, having previously released two albums under the name Hello Skinny. It was announced 7 September along with the release of the lead single "Bishara". The album and lead single are named after Abdul Wadud's record label Bishara which released his solo album By Myself. Skinner described the album as "an attempt to put something truthful into the world, through collaboration and community, at a time of rising dishonesty and disinformation." "Bishara" is an Arabic word which means "good news" or "bringer of good news". The second single "The Journey" was released 18 October alongside a live performance video of the song which was recorded at St. Luke's Church in London.

The album was recorded in a single day with all five performers – drummer Skinner, saxophonist Shabaka Hutchings, bassist Tom Herbert, saxophonist Nubya Garcia, and cellist Kareem Dayes – recording live simultaneously in the same room. Instruments bled into each other's microphones during the recording process, an accidental effect which Skinner accentuated by using editing to emphasise his cuts and create loops from the best improvisatory flourishes.

== Style and reception ==
Voices of Bishara ratings
Review scores
Source	Rating
All About Jazz	4.5/5 stars
AllMusic	4.5/5 stars
Record Collector	3/5 stars
Uncut	8/10

All About Jazz's Chris May called the album "one of the top three jazz albums of 2022 so far and it would take the second comings of John Coltrane, Charles Mingus, Horace Silver and Lee Morgan to threaten to dislodge it." Voices of Bishara consists of "just over thirty minutes of exalted jazz" which is frequently "tumultuous such as "when [Shabaka] Hutchings and [Nubya] Garcia unleash their broken-note strewn tenors" and meditative as "when Hutchings switches to bass clarinet, Garcia to flute, and [Kareem] Dayes' sonorous cello steps forward." May also ranked the album among his five runners up for the best new album of 2022.

Treble's Noah Sparkes notes the presence of Dayes' cello as a tribute to Abdul Wadud, a jazz cellist who once said he "hope[d] there [would] be more who take [the cello] further and do more things, because the instrument needs it". Dayes' "deft and varied playing ... only adds to the unique sound" of the album, which is "a terrific affirmation of what makes Skinner so interesting as both a drummer and now a composer" with tracks that "may drift at different times into hip hop, funk, or free jazz" but never "in a way that seems jarring or forced". In describing Skinner's editing method on the album, The Guardian's Ammar Kalia says its "mood lands somewhere between contemporary Chicago producer Makaya McCraven's beat-splicing and Don Cherry's spiritually influenced 70s melodies.

=== Year-end lists ===
Voices of Bishara year-end lists
Publication	#	Ref.
All About Jazz (Chris May)	—	
All About Jazz (Jerome Wilson)	—	
AllMusic	—	

== Track listing ==
All music is composed by Tom Skinner, with track two being a version of Tony Williams' "Two Pieces of One: Red".

Voices of Bishara track listing
No.	Title	Length
1.	"Bishara"	5:37
2.	"Red 2"	2:57
3.	"The Journey"	5:01
4.	"The Day After Tomorrow"	4:59
5.	"Voices (of the Past)"	4:50
6.	"Quiet as It's Kept"	4:03
Total length:		27:29

== Personnel ==
=== Musicians ===
- Tom Skinner – drums
- Kareem Dayes – cello
- Nubya Garcia – tenor saxophone, flute
- Tom Herbert – acoustic bass
- Shabaka Hutchings – tenor saxophone, bass clarinet

=== Technical ===
- Tom Skinner – producer
- Blue May - recording engineer
- Scott Knapper - assistant recording engineer
- Dilip Harris - mixing engineer
- Guy Davie - mastering engineer
- Paul Camo - sleeve design, artwork
- Craig Hansen - layout

== Live album ==
Voices of Bishara Live at "Mu"

Live album by Tom Skinner
- Released: 10 May 2024
- Recorded: January 2023
- Venue: Mu (London)
- Length: 70:58
- Label: International Anthem

Tom Skinner chronology
Voices of Bishara (2022)	Voices of Bishara Live at "Mu" (2024)	Kaleidoscopic Visions (2025)

On 17 April 2024, Skinner announced Voices of Bishara Live at "Mu", a live album which was released on 10 May by International Anthem. The album was recorded in January 2023 at Mu, a concert venue in London, with Skinner leading Dayes, Herbert, and woodwinds players Robert Stillman and Chelsea Carmichael.

=== Track listing ===
Voices of Bishara Live at "Mu" track listing
No.	Title	Writer(s)	Length
1.	"Bishara"	Tom Skinner	15:05
2.	"Red 2"	Anthony Tillmon Williams	5:20
3.	"The Journey"	Skinner	7:49
4.	"The Day After Tomorrow"	Skinner	5:56
5.	"Oasis"	Ronald Earsall DeVaughn	20:18
6.	"Camille"	DeVaughn	7:51
7.	"Happiness"	DeVaughn	8:39
Total length:			70:58

=== Personnel ===
- Tom Skinner – drums
- Kareem Dayes – cello
- Tom Herbert – acoustic bass
- Robert Stillman and Chelsea Carmichael – woodwinds
- Juan Blanco – audio engineer
- Dilip Harris – mixing engineer
- David Allen – mastering engineer
