= Perceive Its Beauty, Acknowledge Its Grace =

Studio album by Shabaka
- Released: 12 April 2024
- Recorded: 2022
- Studio: Van Gelder Studio, Englewood Cliffs, New Jersey
- Genre: Jazz; new age music
- Length: 46:46
- Label: Impulse!
- Producer: Shabaka Hutchings; Dilip Harris

Shabaka chronology
Afrikan Culture (2022)	Perceive Its Beauty, Acknowledge Its Grace (2024)

Singles from Perceive Its Beauty, Acknowledge Its Grace
- 1. "End of Innocence" Released: 28 February 2024; 2. "I'll Do Whatever You Want" Released: 21 March 2024

Perceive Its Beauty, Acknowledge Its Grace is the solo debut studio album of London jazz musician Shabaka Hutchings, working under the name Shabaka. It was released by Impulse! Records on 12 April 2024. The album was preceded by two singles, "End of Innocence" and "I'll Do Whatever You Want".

The album follows Hutchings's hiatus from the saxophone and the end of his bands Sons of Kemet and the Comet Is Coming, and sees him focusing on different types of flutes, including the shakuhachi and the svirel, as well as the clarinet.

The album was recorded in Van Gelder Studio in 2022. Hutchings shared producing duties with Dilip Harris, and brought in a long list of collaborators including his own father Anum Iyapo, André 3000, Laraaji, and Floating Points. Musically, it focuses on jazz and new age music. Critical reception for the album was positive, highlighting the boldness of Hutchings's shift in style.

== Background ==
On 1 January 2023, Hutchings announced his intention to take an indefinite hiatus from playing the saxophone, explaining later in the year that his enthusiasm for the instrument had waned after years of intense touring. This also coincided with the end of his two bands, Sons of Kemet and the Comet Is Coming. Hutchings's last live saxophone performance was on 7 December 2023, where he played John Coltrane's A Love Supreme at the Institute of Contemporary Arts in London.

Hutchings's new musical interests lied primarily with the flute and similar instruments, having started with them in 2019 after acquiring his first shakuhachi. Subsequent instruments Hutchings picked up include Mayan Teotihuacan drone flutes, Brazilian pifanos, Native American flutes, Slavic svirels, and South American quenas. The move coincided with an increase in attention on jazz flute following the release of André 3000's 2023 album New Blue Sun, on which Hutchings contributed shakuhachi to one track.

== Release ==
Hutchings announced the album on 28 February 2024, set for a release on 12 April by Impulse! Records. On the same day, he released its lead single, "End of Innocence", along with a music video directed by Phoebe Boswell. "End of Innocence" sees Hutchings playing the clarinet, with a band consisting of pianist Jason Moran, drummer Nasheet Waits, and percussionist Carlos Niño.

The second single, "I'll Do Whatever You Want", was released on 21 March. Hutchings cowrote the song with Laraaji and Floating Points. It features Hutchings on shakuhachi, André 3000 on drone flute, Laraaji's wordless vocals, Floating Points on Rhodes Chroma synthesizer and vibraphone, Esperanza Spalding and Tom Herbert on bass, Dave Okumu on guitar, Marcus Gilmore on drums, and Niño on percussion. Hutchings said the song is "about surrender and the intimate space we go to within the grasp of possession." Other musicians on the record include Moses Sumney, Brandee Younger, Miguel Atwood-Ferguson, Saul Williams, Lianne La Havas, and Elucid.

Perceive Its Beauty, Acknowledge Its Grace is Hutchings's solo debut studio album, following his 2022 solo EP Afrikan Culture, which also centered Hutchings's woodwind play. The titles of both releases are connected; in Hutchings's words, they're mean to be read as "Afrikan Culture, comma, Perceive Its Beauty, Acknowledge Its Grace", with his next album being "the next sentence in a long form poem that encapsulates, hopefully, all the solo records of my career." The song names on the album were extracted from a poem written for the album.

== Recording ==
The album was recorded over six days in Van Gelder Studio in New Jersey, starting in May 2022 and mostly taking place that year. Hutchings described the studio as having "informed the sound of so many seminal jazz albums that have shaped my musical aptitude".

Players were not given music beforehand as Hutchings was less interested in creating songs than "liminal spaces" and "a sense of 'suspended animation.'" Believing that anything past a basic level of composition could be a potential inhibitor to creating the atmosphere he was looking for, Hutchings had his musicians record without headphones and without being separated in the room, enabling them to "capture the atmosphere of simply playing together in the space without a technological intermediary." He also told everyone to play as if they were playing the intro or outro of a song.

Subsequently, Hutchings took the raw recordings from those sessions and reworked them, adding alternate horn lines and composed melodies on top. He cited Flying Lotus's production style as an inspiration toward this, saying:

I really like when it sounds like he's gotten together a bunch of recordings, live recordings or studio sessions, but it's the way that he finds the interesting bits of the material that's recorded, how he programs them next to each other. What he decides to add, whether that's like a kick drum, whether that's other samples, and that's the idea that I wanted to have with this album. Without it sounding like that kind of album, basically.

Closing track "Song of the Motherland" features a poem by Hutchings's father, Orville Hutchings, also known as Anum Iyapo. Orville, who primarily worked as a graphic designer for albums by artists including King Tubby and Jah Shaka, recorded a reggae poetry album called Song of the Motherland in 1985. Hutchings picked the poem from one of his father's poetry books and asked his father to record the recitation when he came to the studio for other reasons, having not told him of the plan ahead of time. After listening to the music for a couple minutes, Orville recorded the whole thing in one take, finishing exactly on the last note of the music. Song of the Motherland was reissued by Hutchings's record label Native Rebel on 25 May.

Hutchings named influences such as Björk's Vespertine, Antony and the Johnsons' The Crying Light, and Joanna Newsom's Ys.

== Style ==
Perceive Its Beauty, Acknowledge Its Grace consists of a fusion of jazz and new age music. Compared to Hutchings's "confrontational, staccato" saxophone playstyle, his flute is "more introspective and fluid". Critics frequently made comparisons to Don Cherry and Alice Coltrane among other artists. Hutchings plays a variety of flutes on the album, including the shakuhachi and svirel, and also plays clarinet on three tracks and even returns to the tenor saxophone for the end of "Breathing". Some tracks include vocals from singers including Moses Sumney, Lianne La Havas, and Laraaji, as well as rapper Elucid and spoken word poetry from Saul Williams. The music centers on a recurring seven-note figure.

== Reception ==
Perceive Its Beauty, Acknowledge Its Grace ratings
Aggregate scores
Source	Rating
Metacritic	84/100
Review scores
Source	Rating
AllMusic	4/5 stars
The Arts Desk	4/5 stars
Jazzwise	4/5 stars
The Line of Best Fit	8/10
Louder Than War	4.5/5 stars
Mojo	4/5 stars
Pitchfork	8/10
The Skinny	4/5 stars
Spin	B+
Uncut	8/10

According to the review aggregator Metacritic, Perceive Its Beauty, Acknowledge Its Grace received "universal acclaim" based on a weighted average score of 84 out of 100 from 6 critic scores. Jazzwise's Kevin Le Gendre called the album "some of the most meditative music Hutchings has made in his career to date" and an "intriguing blend of influences and ideas that is well helmed by Hutchings's artfully low warm and breathy flute lines." Mojo's John Mulvey wrote that "The tools change, the air moves in different ways, the vision evolves; and one of our finest musicians might have just achieved a higher state of artistic consciousness."

Louder Than War's Gordon Rutherford said Hutchings's change in style was done with "admirable boldness", and called the album "a collection of reflective compositions, warm and personal, and created by an artist at the top of his game." Uncut's Louis Pattison called "I'll Do Whatever You Want" a highlight and "a gentle nimbus of melody". The Line of Best Fit's Janne Oinonen said the album "isn't an easy sell at a time thoroughly infested with quick thrills and instant gratification. Give it time to bloom, however, and these tracks are infused with plenty of the qualities referred to in the album's title."

Pitchfork's Hank Shteamer wrote that "Amid the ever-shifting personnel, it's the confidence of Shabaka's vision and the potency of his playing that leave the strongest impression", and that with songs like "As the Planets and the Stars Collapse", "you don't miss the big, loud, shiny horn, or the in-your-face ensemble sound of a band like Sons of Kemet, in the slightest." The Quietus's Jeremy Allen wrote that "Hutchings might have already peaked: Perceive Its Beauty's untutored expression conveys emotion sparingly and, sometimes, devastatingly. That sense of freshness may be difficult to capture again as he masters his instrument (though let us state that he's no slouch either)." AllMusic's Thom Jurek said the album's "gentle, warm production and unhurried playing are deceptive: These tunes, as rendered, are far more complex in arrangement and presentation than they appear. Combined, they reveal the artist's pursuit of creative excellence as an aesthetic practice with a spiritual dimension."

=== Year-end lists ===
Select year-end rankings for Perceive Its Beauty, Acknowledge Its Grace
Publication/critic	Accolade	Rank	Ref.
MOJO	The Best Albums of 2024	12	
Uncut	80 Best Albums of 2024	18	

== Track listing ==
All tracks are written by Shabaka Hutchings with others noted.

Perceive Its Beauty, Acknowledge Its Grace track listing
No.	Title	Writer(s)	Length
1.	"End of Innocence"		2:36
2.	"As the Planets and the Stars Collapse"	Miguel Atwood-Ferguson	2:35
3.	"Insecurities" (featuring Moses Sumney)	Sumney; Charles Overton	4:39
4.	"Managing My Breath, What Fear Had Become" (featuring Saul Williams)	Williams	3:11
5.	"The Wounded Need to Be Replenished"	Hutchings	2:44
6.	"Body to Inhabit" (featuring Elucid)	Chaz Jerome Hall	7:28
7.	"I'll Do Whatever You Want" (featuring Laraaji and Floating Points)	Hutchings; Laraaji; Sam Shepherd	7:43
8.	"Living" (featuring Eska)	Eska Mtungwazi; Atwood-Ferguson	3:41
9.	"Breathing"		4:27
10.	"Kiss Me Before I Forget" (featuring Lianne La Havas)		2:57
11.	"Song of the Motherland" (featuring Anum Iyapo)		4:45
Total length:			46:46

== Personnel ==
=== Musicians ===
- Shabaka Hutchings – bandleader, clarinet (1, 9, 10), shakuhachi (2, 3, 7), flute (4, 6, 9, 11), quena (5), svirel (6, 8), tenor saxophone (9)
- Jason Moran – piano (1, 10)
- Nasheet Waits – drums (1, 10)
- Carlos Niño – percussion (1, 5, 7, 10)
- Miguel Atwood-Ferguson – violin (2, 8), viola (2, 8), cello (2, 8)
- Brandee Younger – harp (2, 6, 8)
- Charles Overton – harp (2–4, 6, 8, 11)
- Moses Sumney – vocals (3)
- Saul Williams – vocals (4)
- Nduduzo Makhathini – piano (5)
- Surya Botofasina – synthesiser (5)
- Elucid – vocals (6)
- Chris Sholar – electronic percussion (6)
- Esperanza Spalding – bass (6, 7)
- André 3000 – Teotihuacan drone flute (7)
- Floating Points – Rhodes Chroma synthesizer (7), vibraphone (7)
- Laraaji – vocals (7)
- Tom Herbert – bass (7)
- Dave Okumu – guitar (7)
- Marcus Gilmore – drums (7)
- Eska – vocals (8)
- Rajna Swaminathan – mrudangam (9)
- Lianne La Havas – vocals (10)
- Anum Iyapo – vocals (11)

=== Technical ===
- Shabaka Hutchings – producer
- Dilip Harris – producer, mixing engineer, mastering engineer (7)
- Sam Shepherd – additional producer (7), mastering engineer (7)
- Maureen Sickler – recording engineer
- William Purton – recording engineer (2, 9–11)
- Saul Williams – recording engineer (4)
- Eska – recording engineer (8)
- Guy Davie – mastering engineer

== Charts ==
Chart performance for Perceive Its Beauty, Acknowledge Its Grace
Chart (2024)	Peak position
Belgian Albums (Ultratop Flanders)	91
UK Jazz & Blues Albums (OCC)	1
