= The Smashing Machine (soundtrack) =

The Smashing Machine (Original Motion Picture Soundtrack)
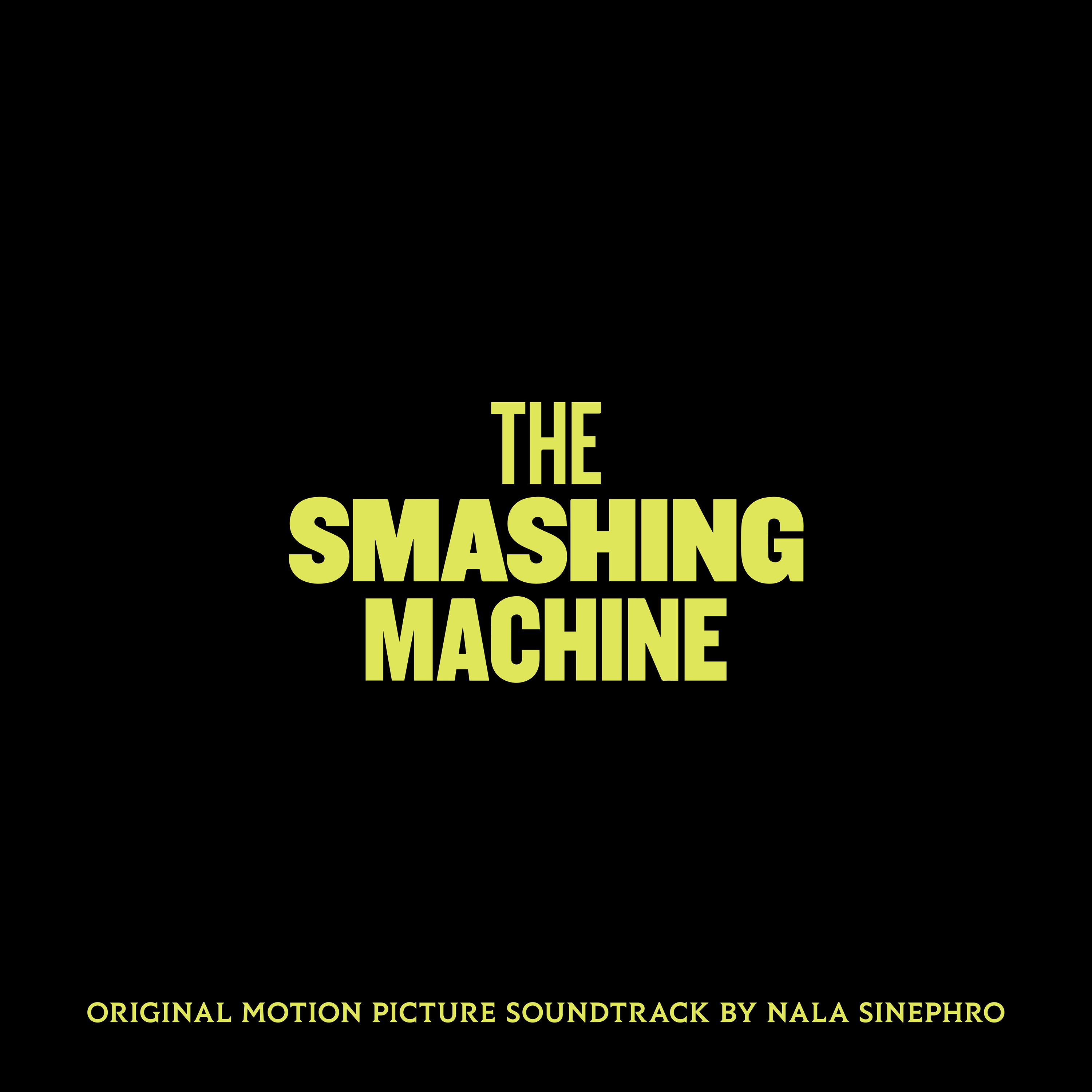

Film score by Nala Sinephro
- Released: October 3, 2025
- Recorded: 2025
- Studio: Abbey Road Studios, London
- Genre: Film score; experimental; avant-garde jazz; ambient
- Length: 25:16
- Label: A24 Music; Warp Records
- Producer: Nala Sinephro

Nala Sinephro chronology
Endlessness (2024)	The Smashing Machine (2025)

The Smashing Machine (Original Motion Picture Soundtrack) is the film score to the 2025 film The Smashing Machine written, directed, co-produced, and edited by Benny Safdie, which is based on the documentary The Smashing Machine: The Life and Times of Extreme Fighter Mark Kerr (2002), which is based on former amateur wrestler and MMA fighter Mark Kerr, starring Dwayne Johnson as Kerr alongside Emily Blunt, Ryan Bader, Bas Rutten and Oleksandr Usyk.

== Background ==
In April 2025, it was announced that experimental jazz musician Nala Sinephro is composing the score for The Smashing Machine, her maiden composition for a feature film. Safdie chose to work with her after listening to her acclaimed studio album Endlessness (2024).

Sinephro used synthesizers, harp, modular synths and harmonium as the basic soundscape for the score. Besides composing, Sinephro further arranged, produced, recorded and mixed the score. The album was recorded at the Abbey Road Studios in London.

Sinephro associated with the regular collaborators—James Mollison (saxophone), Nubya Garcia (saxophone, flute), Morgan Simpson (drums), Sheila Maurice-Gray (flugelhorn), Lyle Barton (rhodes, synthesizers), Mark Mollison (guitar), Dwayne Kilvington (synth bass), and strings played by the Orchestrate band.

The soundtrack was released through A24 Music and Warp Records on October 3, 2025. A vinyl edition is also scheduled to be released on January 23, 2026.

== Reception ==
Nina Corcoran of Pitchfork wrote "Coming off the revelatory Space 1.8 and Endlessness, the synth composer's debut score is a disarmingly rich, romantic sweep of starlit strings and yearning synths, dotted with jazz-drum solos (played by Natcyet Wakili and Black Midi's Morgan Simpson) and her typically understated harp filigree and pendulous arrangements." Andrew Sacher of BrooklynVegan wrote "Nala pieced together a series of compositions that toe the line between her usual meditative material, some more traditional jazz moments, and some more traditional film score-ish moments [...] it has much of the same allure as Nala's proper albums."

Richard Lawson of Rolling Stone wrote "Composer Nala Sinephro's score is a woozy jumble of alt-jazz, shuffling and lilting around Kerr as he steadfastly pursues his dream. It's all rather enveloping but also, at times, almost soporific, lulling us into a sort of daze when, maybe, we should be held in suspense and alert." Amy Nicholson of Los Angeles Times called it a "rattle-snap jazz score". Ryan Lattanzio of IndieWire wrote "Poetic flourishes buoyed by Nala Sinephro's ambiently riff-some jazz score, which often works antithetically to the toughness of the images onscreen, almost find the movie daydreaming in space the way Mark does when on an opioid high (which here looks more like a low)." Tara Brady of The Irish Times wrote "Nala Sinephro's minimalist score hums with quiet menace".

John Nugent of Empire called it an "elegant, dreamy score". Damon Wise of Deadline Hollywood wrote "the ambient free-jazz score by Nala Sinephro, leads the way ahead of perhaps the most eclectic needle-drops of the year, bringing together Bruce Springsteen, Timi Yuri, Little Suzy and The Alan Parsons Project." Kyle Smith of The Wall Street Journal wrote "In lieu of inspiring, anthemic music, the score, by Nala Sinephro, is a jagged, discordant thing more akin to noise." Bilge Ebiri of Vulture wrote "A lovely score by experimental jazz musician Nala Sinephro enhances this feeling of a world always creeping closer to the edge of an emotional cliff; the music at times feels more like part of the sound design than a proper movie soundtrack." B. Allan Johnson of SLUG wrote "If there's anything Safdie has been consistent with across his films, it's his soundtracks. Devoid of energy, the original score by Nala Sinephro features a quiet, reflective saxophone. It's meditative and peaceful. Drums freestyle as Kerr fights his competitors, all leading to climactic thuds."

== Track listing ==
No.	Title	Length
1.	"Dawn"	2:15
2.	"Grand Prix"	4:02
3.	"The Smashing Machine"	8:43
4.	"The High"	1:15
5.	"Mark"	1:44
6.	"KO"	4:41
7.	"Mark II"	1:30
8.	"Dawn II"	1:08
Total length:		25:16

== Charts ==
Chart performance for The Smashing Machine (Original Motion Picture Soundtrack)
Chart (2025–2026)	Peak position
UK Album Downloads (OCC)	65
UK Jazz & Blues Albums (OCC)	21
UK Soundtrack Albums (OCC)	33

== Release history ==
Release history and formats for The Smashing Machine (Original Motion Picture Soundtrack)
Region	Date	Format(s)	Label(s)	Ref.
Various	October 3, 2025	Digital download; streaming	A24 Music	
Various	January 23, 2026	LP	A24 Music	
