= Endlessness =

Studio album by Nala Sinephro
- Released: 6 September 2024
- Studios: Pink Bird Recording Co.; Nala Sinephro's home
- Genre: Jazz
- Length: 45:19
- Label: Warp
- Producer: Nala Sinephro

Nala Sinephro chronology
Space 1.8 (2021)	Endlessness (2024)	The Smashing Machine (2025)

Endlessness is the second studio album by Nala Sinephro. It was released on 6 September 2024 through Warp Records. It topped the UK Jazz & Blues Albums Chart. It received universal acclaim from critics.

== Background ==
Endlessness is a follow-up to Nala Sinephro's debut studio album, Space 1.8 (2021). She composed, produced, arranged, and engineered the album. It features guest appearances from James Mollison, Morgan Simpson, Sheila Maurice-Grey, Nubya Garcia, Natcyet Wakili, Lyle Barton, and Dwayne Kilvington, joined by Orchestrate. The album's cover art is painted by Daniela Yohannes and designed by Maziyar Pahlevan. The album consists of 10 tracks, clocking in at 45 minutes. It was released on 6 September 2024 through Warp Records.

== Critical reception ==
Professional ratings
Aggregate scores
Source	Rating
AnyDecentMusic?	8.1/10
Metacritic	83/100
Review scores
Source	Rating
AllMusic	4/5 stars
Beats per Minute	88%
Clash	9/10
The Guardian	4/5 stars
Mojo	3/5 stars
The Observer	4/5 stars
Pitchfork	8.5/10
PopMatters	9/10
The Skinny	5/5 stars
Uncut	8/10

According to the review aggregator Metacritic, Endlessness received "universal acclaim" based on a weighted average score of 83 out of 100 from 13 critic scores.

Adriane Pontecorvo of PopMatters stated, "The complexities of this riveting LP are laced with autumnal breezes, beautiful gradients, and careful explorations in exceptional detail that sometimes hit a simmer but never sweat." Daniel Felsenthal of Pitchfork commented that "The LP has the potential to be a relaxed listen if you welcome this side of its personality, but it's also vast and complicated." Paul Simpson of AllMusic called the album "refreshing, enlightening, and awe-inspiring all at once."

It co-won the Best Jazz Record award at the 2025 Libera Awards.

=== Accolades ===
Year-end lists for Endlessness
Publication	List	Rank	Ref.
AllMusic	AllMusic Best of 2024	—	
Beats Per Minute	BPM's Top 50 Albums of 2024	16	
Clash	Albums of the Year 2024	20	
Consequence	The 50 Best Albums of 2024	44	
Crack	The Top 50 Albums of 2024	3	
DJ Mag	DJ Mag's Top Albums of 2024	—	
Exclaim!	Exclaim!'s 50 Best Albums of 2024	49	
The Guardian	The 50 Best Albums of 2024	30	
The Line of Best Fit	The Best Albums of 2024	6	
NPR Music	The 50 Best Albums of 2024	—	
Paste	The 100 Best Albums of 2024	10	
Pitchfork	The 50 Best Albums of 2024	5	
The Skinny	The Skinny's Albums of 2024	19	
Stereogum	The 50 Best Albums of 2024	23	

== Track listing ==
Endlessness track listing
No.	Title	Writer(s)	Length
1.	"Continuum 1"	Nala Sinephro; James Mollison; Morgan Simpson	7:13
2.	"Continuum 2"	Sinephro; Sheila Maurice-Grey; Nubya Garcia; Lyle Barton; Natcyet Wakili	7:01
3.	"Continuum 3"	Sinephro	4:07
4.	"Continuum 4"	Sinephro	2:30
5.	"Continuum 5"	Sinephro; Garcia	1:26
6.	"Continuum 6"	Sinephro; Garcia; Barton; Wakili	4:34
7.	"Continuum 7"	Sinephro; Barton	4:05
8.	"Continuum 8"	Sinephro; Maurice-Grey; Barton; Dwayne Kilvington; Wakili	4:10
9.	"Continuum 9"	Sinephro; Mollison; Barton	3:20
10.	"Continuum 10"	Sinephro; Kilvington; Wakili	6:53
Total length:			45:19

== Personnel ==
Credits adapted from liner notes.

- Nala Sinephro – production, synthesizer, modular synthesizer (1, 2, 5, 8), harp (2, 3), piano (4, 10), recording (1–8, 10), engineering (1, 2, 6–8, 10), mixing, strings arrangement, strings conducting
- James Mollison – saxophone (1, 9)
- Morgan Simpson – drums (1)
- Sheila Maurice-Grey – flugelhorn (2), trumpet (8)
- Nubya Garcia – saxophone (2, 5, 6)
- Natcyet Wakili – drums (2, 6, 8, 10)
- Lyle Barton – piano (2), synthesizer (3, 6–9)
- Dwayne Kilvington – synthesizer (8, 10)
- Alice Sinephro – additional bass sample (4)
- Rick David – recording (1–3, 5–10), engineering (1, 2, 6–10), strings recording, strings engineering
- Marc Broer – recording (8)
- Vera Kraaijkamp – recording (8)
- Guy Davie – mastering (10)
- Orchestrate – strings, bass flute
- Rob Ames – strings orchestration, strings conducting
- Alex Ferguson – strings recording, strings engineering
- Jedidiah Rimell – strings recording, strings engineering
- Daniela Yohannes – painting
- Maziyar Pahlevan – design

== Charts ==
Chart performance for Endlessness
Chart (2024)	Peak position
Belgian Albums (Ultratop Flanders)	50
Scottish Albums (Official Charts)	55
UK Independent Albums (Official Charts)	10
UK Jazz & Blues Albums (Official Charts)	1
