= Your Queen Is a Reptile =

Studio album by Sons of Kemet
- Released: 30 March 2018
- Genre: Avant-garde jazz
- Length: 55:34
- Label: Impulse!
- Producer: Shabaka Hutchings, Dilip Harris

Sons of Kemet chronology
Lest We Forget What We Came Here to Do (2015)	Your Queen Is a Reptile (2018)	Black to the Future (2021)

Professional ratings
Aggregate scores
Source	Rating
Metacritic	81/100
Review scores
Source	Rating
AllMusic	4.5/5 stars
Exclaim!	8/10
The Independent	4/5 stars
Mojo	3/5 stars
MusicOMH	4/5 stars
Pitchfork	7.6/10
The Times	3/5 stars
Uncut	8/10
Under the Radar	8.5/10
Vice	A−

Your Queen Is a Reptile is the third album by British jazz group Sons of Kemet, released in March 2018 on Impulse! Records. Band leader Shabaka Hutchings wrote and plays saxophone on all tracks, Theon Cross plays tuba, and Seb Rochford and Tom Skinner play drums. It also features toaster Congo Natty and performance poet Josh Idehen.

The album title refers to the British monarchy and the Reptilian conspiracy theory, with the sleeve notes depicting the monarchy as not representing black immigrants: "Your Queen is not our Queen / She does not see us as human". The woman to whom the first track refers, Ada Eastman, was Hutchings's great-grandmother from Barbados, while the others refer to influential black women throughout history.

Your Queen Is a Reptile was nominated for the 2018 Mercury Prize. The album topped The Wire magazine's annual critics' poll and was named release of the year. This is the band's longest album, at 55 minutes and 34 seconds.

== Track listing ==
All tracks written by Shabaka Hutchings.

1. "My Queen Is Ada Eastman" – 6:41
2. "My Queen Is Mamie Phipps Clark" – 5:31
3. "My Queen Is Harriet Tubman" – 5:40
4. "My Queen Is Anna Julia Cooper" – 5:07
5. "My Queen Is Angela Davis" – 6:35
6. "My Queen Is Nanny of the Maroons" – 6:44
7. "My Queen Is Yaa Asantewaa" – 7:04
8. "My Queen Is Albertina Sisulu" – 5:20
9. "My Queen Is Doreen Lawrence" – 6:52

== Personnel ==
Sons of Kemet

- Theon Cross – tuba
- Shabaka Hutchings – saxophone
- Seb Rochford – drums (except 3 and 7)
- Tom Skinner – drums

Additional musicians

- Moses Boyd – drums (tracks 3, 7, 8)
- Maxwell Hallett – drums (track 9)
- Eddie Hick – drums (tracks 3, 7)
- Nubya Garcia – saxophone (track 7)
- Pete Wareham – saxophone (track 4)
- Josh Idehen – vocals (tracks 1, 9)
- Congo Natty – vocals (track 2)
