= I Came from Love =

Studio album by Dave Okumu and the 7 Generations
- Released: 14 April 2023
- Length: 65:49
- Label: Transgressive
- Producer: Dave Okumu; Lexxx

Dave Okumu chronology
Knopperz (2021)	I Came from Love (2023)

I Came from Love is the second album by British musician Dave Okumu, credited as a collaboration with "the 7 Generations," released on 14 April 2023 through Transgressive Records. Most tracks feature various vocalists, including Eska, Grace Jones, Kwabs, Wesley Joseph, and Anthony Joseph. It received acclaim from critics.

== Background ==
Although primarily a solo album, Okumu wanted to credit the album to a "semi-pseudonym" as he did not make it alone and he wanted to credit "[his] actual ancestors, the ancestors of others, [his] musical ancestors, and [his] descendants," also expressing that he hoped "listeners will feel like they're part of the 7 Generations, and when [he] performs on stage, every member of the band is part of the 7 Generations". The backing band includes Nick Ramm on keyboards, Aviram Barath on synthesizers, and his regular collaborator Tom Skinner on drums.

== Critical reception ==
Professional ratings
Aggregate scores
Source	Rating
Metacritic	83/100
Review scores
Source	Rating
AllMusic	4/5 stars
Clash	9/10
DIY	4.5/5 stars
The Guardian	4/5 stars
Mojo	4/5 stars
MusicOMH	4/5 stars
The Observer	4/5 stars
Uncut	7/10

I Came from Love received a score of 83 out of 100 on review aggregator Metacritic based on eight critics' reviews, indicating "universal acclaim". Tayyab Amin of The Guardian called it "stacked with fascinating features [...] and drawing from an extensive lineage of Black experience" with "seamless genre switch-ups [that] ensure I Came from Love finds strength in its multiplicity". Mojo described it as "an often challenging, always thrilling triumph that rewards deep listening and re-listening", while Uncut called it "all necessarily mood but never morose".

Kitty Empire of The Observer found it to be "a more definitive solo statement, boasting vocals, prose readings and illustrious guests" and "while it's an emotional listen, I Came from Love is not a difficult record, musically", writing that "Get Out is a stark, Prince-ish funk track" and "Eyes on Me is a pop tune about the distorting structures of racism". AllMusic's Paul Simpson called I Came from Love "a reflection of [Okumu's] own life and family ancestry [...] as well as an exploration of Black history as a whole", also finding it to be "an informative, emotionally heavy album reminding listeners of the harsh realities and injustices of history, while encouraging resistance and change".

DIY's Bella Martin stated that it is "as sonically rich as his past work would suggest, each track consisting of whipsmart layers of lush noises, a carousel of collaborators joining in as a backing band of sorts" and concluded by calling it a "poignant, thought-provoking record on so many levels". Nick Roseblade of Clash opined that it is "the best album that Okumu has released but it's one of the finest albums of the year so far", summarising it as a "tapestry of black experience wrapped up in with glorious melodies, catchy choruses and dripping in emotion". Ben Hogwood of MusicOMH summed it up as "a cohesive musical statement in spite of its length" and "his first-hand experiences mean Okumu's sonorous tones carry powerful messages, in what is one of his finest musical achievements to date".

== Track listing ==
I Came from Love track listing
No.	Title	Length
1.	"Two Things" (featuring Grace Jones)	0:45
2.	"7 Generations" (featuring Wesley Joseph, Eska and Grace Jones)	6:21
3.	"Blood Ah Go Run" (featuring Wesley Joseph and Eska)	3:35
4.	"Streets"	6:21
5.	"My Negritude" (featuring Anthony Joseph)	4:02
6.	"The Cost" (featuring Kwabs)	3:17
7.	"Prison" (featuring Wesley Joseph)	6:12
8.	"Black Firework" (featuring Anthony Joseph, Eska and Kwabs)	4:16
9.	"Scenes" (featuring Kwabs and Anthony Joseph)	4:44
10.	"Amnesia" (featuring Eska)	4:00
11.	"Get Out" (featuring Wesley Joseph and Eska)	3:56
12.	"The Struggle" (featuring Wesley Joseph, Eska and Kwabs)	1:54
13.	"Eyes on Me"	5:10
14.	"Abaka"	6:42
15.	"A Paradise" (featuring Wesley Joseph, Eska and Grace Jones)	4:34
Total length:		65:49
