= Black to the Future (Sons of Kemet album) =

Studio album by Sons of Kemet
- Released: 14 May 2021
- Studio: Livingston Studio 1
- Genre: Jazz
- Length: 51:07
- Label: Impulse!
- Producers: Shabaka Hutchings; Dilip Harris

Sons of Kemet chronology
Your Queen Is a Reptile (2018)	Black to the Future (2021)

Black to the Future is the fourth and final studio album by British jazz group Sons of Kemet. It was released via Impulse! Records on 14 May 2021 to widespread critical acclaim from music critics.

== Critical reception ==
Professional ratings
Aggregate scores
Source	Rating
AnyDecentMusic?	8.6/10
Metacritic	84/100
Review scores
Source	Rating
AllMusic	4.5/5 stars
Clash	9/10
Exclaim!	8/10
The Independent	4/5 stars
Loud and Quiet	8/10
Mojo	4/5 stars
NME	5/5 stars
The Observer	4/5 stars
Pitchfork	7.4/10
The Skinny	5/5 stars

The album received widespread acclaim from critics. At Metacritic, which assigns a normalized rating out of 100 to reviews from professional publications, the album received an average score of 84, based on 16 reviews, indicating "universal acclaim". Aggregator AnyDecentMusic? gave the album an 8.6 out of 10, based on their assessment of the critical consensus.

=== Accolades ===
Black to the Future on year-end lists
Publication	List	Rank	Ref.
Paste	The 50 Best Albums of 2021	26	

== Track listing ==
Black to the Future track listing
No.	Title	Length
1.	"Field Negus" (featuring Joshua Idehen)	3:03
2.	"Pick Up Your Burning Cross" (featuring Moor Mother and Angel Bat Dawid)	3:44
3.	"Think of Home"	3:32
4.	"Hustle" (featuring Kojey Radical)	5:18
5.	"For the Culture" (featuring D Double E)	4:01
6.	"To Never Forget the Source"	2:55
7.	"In Remembrance of Those Fallen"	5:06
8.	"Let the Circle Be Unbroken"	6:29
9.	"Envision Yourself Levitating"	8:22
10.	"Throughout the Madness, Stay Strong"	5:53
11.	"Black" (featuring Joshua Idehen)	2:42
Total length:		51:07

== Personnel ==
Credits adapted from Mojo review.

Sons of Kemet

- Theon Cross – tuba
- Shabaka Hutchings – tenor saxophone, woodwinds
- Tom Skinner – percussion
- Edward Wakili-Hick – percussion

Additional musicians

- Steve Williamson – tenor saxophone
- Joshua Idehen – vocals
- Angel Bat Dawid – vocals
- Moor Mother – vocals
- D Double E – vocals
- Kojey Radical – vocals
- Lianne La Havas – vocals

== Charts ==
Chart performance for Black to the Future
Chart (2021)	Peak position
Belgian Albums (Ultratop Flanders)	26
Belgian Albums (Ultratop Wallonia)	59
German Albums (Offizielle Top 100)	32
Scottish Albums (Official Charts)	18
Swedish Jazz Albums (Sverigetopplistan)	3
Swiss Albums (Schweizer Hitparade)	59
UK Albums (Official Charts)	54
