= Dilip Harris =

English record producer

Dilip Harris is a London-based record producer and sound engineer. He has worked with artists including Shabaka Hutchings, Mount Kimbie, Mica Levi, King Krule, Jessie Ware, and Mulatu Astatke. He won the Music Producers Guild's Breakthrough Producer of the Year award in 2019, and records he worked on have been nominated for the Mercury Prize.

== Selected production work ==
- Shabaka Hutchings, Perceive Its Beauty, Acknowledge Its Grace, Afrikan Culture, We Are Sent Here by History
- Mount Kimbie, The Sunset Violent
- King Krule, Space Heavy, Man Alive!, The Ooz
- Sons of Kemet, Black to the Future, Your Queen Is a Reptile
- Young Disciples, Road to Freedom (under the pseudonym "Demus")
