= Ariya Astrobeat Arkestra =

British music band

The Ariya Astrobeat Arkestra
- Origin: Leeds, United Kingdom
- Genres: Afrobeat, funk, jazz
- Years active: 2007–present
- Labels: First Word Records
- Members: Eddie Hick, Paul Baxter, Tarek Modi, Neil Innes, Simon Nixon, Pete Williams, Martyn Strange, Leon Johnson, Kris Wright
- Past members: Duncan Hamilton, Gareth Parry, Joost Hendrickx, Al MacSween
- Website: http://www.myspace.com/ariyaafrobeat

The Ariya Astrobeat Arkestra is a Leeds-based afrobeat band that takes its influence from Fela Kuti's Africa 70 band amongst many others. Although their music uses Afrobeat rhythm and language, they also owe part of their sound to the space Jazz pioneers of the 1970s and the free jazz trailblazers of the 1960s. The band have been quoted as crediting James Brown and Tony Allen for having a large influence on their music.

The band was founded in 2007 after a series of jam sessions at the Leeds basement bar and music venue 'Sela Bar'. In 2009 after a couple of years defining their sound, the band were signed to independent record label First Word Records.

In 2010 the band performed throughout the UK at venues such as London's Plan B, Vibe Bar, The Wardrobe in Leeds, Limetree Festival and Shambala festival. On 30 October 2010 the band performed a live session on BBC6 Music for the Craig Charles Funk and Soul Show.

In 2010 The Ariya Astrobeat Arkestra recorded their first single. It was released in January 2010 on 7-inch vinyl. On the A-side is a cover of Crosstown Traffic by Jimi Hendrix with the band opting for an original track 'Lost in Kinshasa' as a B-side.

On 15 November 2010 the band's self-titled debut album 'Ariya Astrobeat Arkestra' was released on worldwide digital download and CD. The album and single for the most part were recorded and mixed at the Analog Rooms in Elland.

On 16 November Jamie Cullum cited The Ariya Astrobeat Arkestra as one of his 'sounds and new bands of the year' after broadcasting them on his show for BBC Radio 2.

In August 2012, Ariya Astrobeat Arkestra announced the arrival of their second album entitled 'Towards Other Worlds'. The band announced public performances at The Wardrobe in Leeds and Bedroom Bar in London for their UK album launch events.

On 14 November, Ariya Astrobeat Arkestra performed alongside Antibalas at London's Islington Assembly Hall. The event was filmed by London-based cinematographer Matthew Lloyd.

In December 2012, BBC's Giles Peterson announced the launch of Towards Other Worlds on BBC6 Music. He described it as 'rootsical, dubbie, arkestral... just the way we like it'.

Ariya Astrobeat Arkestra were awarded the Tropical Sound award at the Giles Peterson Worldwide Awards on 21 January 2013.

== Band ==
- Eddie Hick – Drums (2007–present)
- Paul Baxter – Bass (2007–present)
- Tarek Modi – Keyboards, Synth, Vocoder (2007–present)
- Neil Innes – Guitar (2011–present)
- Simon Nixon – Trumpet (2007–present)
- Pete Williams – Tenor Sax (2007–present)
- Martyn Strange – Baritone Sax (2007–present)
- Leon Johnson – Tenor Sax and Shekere (2007–present)
- Kris Wright – Percussion (2010–present)

== Former members ==
- Duncan Hamilton - Trombone (2007)
- Gareth Parry – Guitar (2007–2011)

== Discography ==
=== Albums ===
- Ariya Astrobeat Arkestra (2010, First Word Records)
- Towards Other Worlds (2012, First Word Records)

=== EPs and singles ===
- Crosstown Traffic (A-side) / Lost in Kinshasa (B-side) (2010, First Word Records) 7"
- Future Ancestors (A-side) / Get On The Floor (B-side) (2012, First Word Records) 7"

== See also ==
- Afrobeat
- Fela Kuti
