= Cassie Kinoshi =

British composer and saxophonist

Background information
- Origin: Hertfordshire, England, United Kingdom
- Genres: Jazz, Classical
- Instrument: Alto Saxophone
- Labels: Jazz re:freshed; Brownswood; Domino
- Member of: SEED Ensemble, Brown Penny
- Formerly of: Kokoroko, Nérija
- Website: cassiekinoshi.co.uk

Cassie Kinoshi is a British composer, saxophonist and bandleader who leads the group SEED Ensemble, who were nominated for a Mercury Prize award in 2019.

== Biography ==
Kinoshi grew up in Welwyn Garden City, Hertfordshire, England, and attended Trinity Laban Conservatoire of Music and Dance (Composition) as well as Tomorrow's Warriors. Cassie attended St. George's School, Harpenden for sixth form where she completed her A level in music.

Kinoshi formed SEED Ensemble in 2016 as a way of celebrating Britain's diversity, and the group has been praised for its conscious look at British society and culture. SEED Ensemble combine jazz with West African and Caribbean music, and Kinoshi told Vinyl Factory: "It's important to me that I shine a light on political subject matter which is often disregarded by the masses and highlight what it means to exist as a young Black British citizen today."

Kinoshi was also a member of the Afrobeat group Kokoroko, and the seven-piece (inactive since 2020) jazz group Nérija. Her six-piece Brown Penny played at SXSW in Austin, Texas, in early 2022 and was due to take part in the EFG London Jazz Festival in November 2022. She left Kokoroko in 2022 to focus on her work with SEED Ensemble.

In 2019, SEED Ensemble were nominated for a Mercury Prize award for their album Driftglass. Kinoshi told DIY that she "screamed really high pitch and ran around in circles" when she heard about the nomination. The album received an 85% jump in sales as a result of the nomination.

Kinoshi is also a composer who writes for theatre, including the National Theatre (Top Girls), the Old Vic Theatre and the London Symphony Orchestra.
