= Burn (Sons of Kemet album) =

Studio album by Sons of Kemet
- Released: 9 September 2013
- Studios: Fish Factory Studios, London
- Genres: Jazz, world
- Length: 49:37
- Label: Naim Records
- Producer: Seb Rochford

Sons of Kemet chronology
Burn (2013)	Lest We Forget What We Came Here to Do (2015)

Professional ratings
Aggregate scores
Source	Rating
Metacritic	78/100
Review scores
Source	Rating
All About Jazz	4/5 stars
The Arts Desk	5/5 stars
Financial Times	3/5 stars
The Guardian	4/5 stars
Mojo	4/5 stars
MusicOMH	4/5 stars
Robert Christgau	(2-star Honorable Mention)

Burn is a debut studio album by British jazz band Sons of Kemet released on 9 September 2013 by Naim Records label. This album, and their running series of critically acclaimed performances, led to them winning the 'Best Jazz Act' in the 2013 MOBO Awards.

Producers such as Micachu, Vince Vella, and Alex Patchwork have remixed various songs from the Burn album. This is the band's shortest album, at under 50 minutes.

== Reception ==
Phil Johnson of The Independent stated, "this is mesmerising trance music of great power." John Fordham of The Guardian noted, "Opening with the galloping-hooves drumming, pulpy tuba hook and Pharoah Sanders-like sax supplications of All Will Surely Burn, the album goes on to balance thunder and reflectiveness surprisingly evenly..." The Arts Desk 's Matthew Wright awarded the album five stars out of five, commenting, "This is still a stunningly vivid and original album, bursting with fresh ideas. What else could simultaneously provoke a rave and a panel discussion about the roots of jazz?" Robert Christgau wrote, "A debut that flaunts their sound, suggests their parameters, and establishes their bona fides." Mike Hobart in his review for Financial Times observed, "The Sons of Kemet deliver insidious riffs, intriguing textures, and a whopping beat..."

== Track listing ==
1. "All Will Surely Burn" 6:19
2. "The Godfather" 5:16
3. "Inner Babylon" 5:20
4. "The Book of Disquiet" 5:34
5. "Going Home" 3:52
6. "Adonia's Lullaby" 4:11
7. "Song for Galeano" 4:24
8. "Beware" 3:37
9. "The It Is" 2:28
10. "Rivers of Babylon" 8:37

== Personnel ==
Sons of Kemet

- Shabaka Hutchings – saxophone, clarinet
- Oren Marshall – tuba
- Seb Rochford – drums
- Tom Skinner – drums

Additional musicians

- Dave Okumu – guitar (tracks 4, 5)

== Awards ==
Winners

- The Arts Desk – Album of the Year 2013
- iTunes Jazz (UK) Best of 2013 (#1)

Nominations

- Gilles Peterson Worldwide Awards – Album Of The Year 2013 (#8)
- The Quietus – Album Of The Year (#59)
