= Last Evenings on Earth (album) =

Studio album by Melt Yourself Down
- Released: 29 April 2016
- Length: 36:20
- Label: The Leaf Label
- Producer: Leafcutter John

Melt Yourself Down chronology
Live at the New Empowering Church (2014)	Last Evenings on Earth (2016)	100% Yes (2020)

Last Evenings on Earth is the second studio album by the London-based band Melt Yourself Down. It follows 2013's eponymous debut and Live at the New Empowering Church, released for Record Store Day in 2014.

== Background ==
The album is named after the collection of short stories by Chilean novelist Roberto Bolaño. The Leaf Label described the album as "a dizzying, continent-hopping voyage, darker and heavier than its predecessor". In an interview, bandleader Peter Wareham explained, "The need to dance is still there but now I’m feeling inspired by the idea of the city as a prism through which all kinds of global influences pass...Translation, immigration, overcoming obstacles - and most of all, human unity." In another interview he explained that "the writing for the album started whilst touring the first album in 2013 and the music naturally evolved as things in our lives have played out since then. By the end the process had become about trying to capture the band’s energy whilst writing and recording"

Clash praised the album as a "blast of musical exploration" and noted that frontman Kusal Gaya is "moving away from his native Mauritian/French Creole to sing in English".

Tracks "Dot to Dot", 'The God of You" and "Jump the Fire" were each released as singles along with music videos.

== Critical reception ==
Professional ratings
Aggregate scores
Source	Rating
Metacritic	73/100
Review scores
Source	Rating
The Arts Desk	3/5 stars
Cultured Vultures	8.5/10
Financial Times	4/5 stars
The Guardian	4/5 stars
Loud and Quiet	6/10
MusicOMH	4.5/5 stars

On the Metacritic website, which aggregates reviews from critics and assigns a normalised rating out of 100, Last Evenings on Earth received a score of 73. The Arts Desk described the album as "relentless" with "forward momentum and a trance-like fervour". Last Evenings on Earth was called "as damn close to a masterpiece as you can get" by Cultured Vultures, who also wrote that the album showed "a band at the height of both command and vision, merging sonics and aesthetics into something uniquely and officially theirs". Loud and Quiet called the album "a perfect mix of David Byrne-esque vocal upon manic tablas, mizmars, electronic beats and guitars" but also wrote that the music is "disappointingly too similar to the great breakthrough of the band’s previous production". MusicOMH wrote that Last Evenings on Earth "is an album that's all about rhythm and energy" informed by "skill, knowledge and passion" and awarded the album 4.5/5. In a four star review, The Guardian wrote that despite the "central themes [of] disease, death and war" the album "refuses to be conquered by misery or contemplation". It continues, "a frenzy of north African instrumentation, punk and deranged jazz leads a collision of sounds that channels the spirit of revolution, and the heat and claustrophobia of a politically fractious city". The Financial Times also awarded the album 4 stars, praising the "rumbling bass, obsessive chants and chopped-up saxophone melodies".

In August 2016, Last Evenings on Earth was nominated for Best "Difficult" Second Album in the AIM awards.

=== Accolades ===
Accolades for Last Evenings on Earth
Publication	Accolade	Year	Rank
The Quietus	Albums of the Year 2016	2016	99
Uncut	Top 75 Albums of 2016	2016	74

== Track listing ==
Last Evenings on Earth track listing
No.	Title	Length
1.	"Dot to Dot"	4:27
2.	"The God of You"	3:45
3.	"Listen Out"	3:53
4.	"Communication"	1:27
5.	"Jump the Fire"	4:14
6.	"Bharat Mata"	5:04
7.	"Big Children (Gran Zanfan)"	4:46
8.	"Body Parts"	5:03
9.	"Yazzan Dayra"	3:41
Total length:		36:20

== Personnel ==
- Peter Wareham – tenor saxophone
- Shabaka Hutchings – tenor saxophone
- Kushal Gaya – vocals
- Ruth Goller – bass guitar
- Tom Skinner – drums
- Satin Singh – percussion
