= Melt Yourself Down =

British band

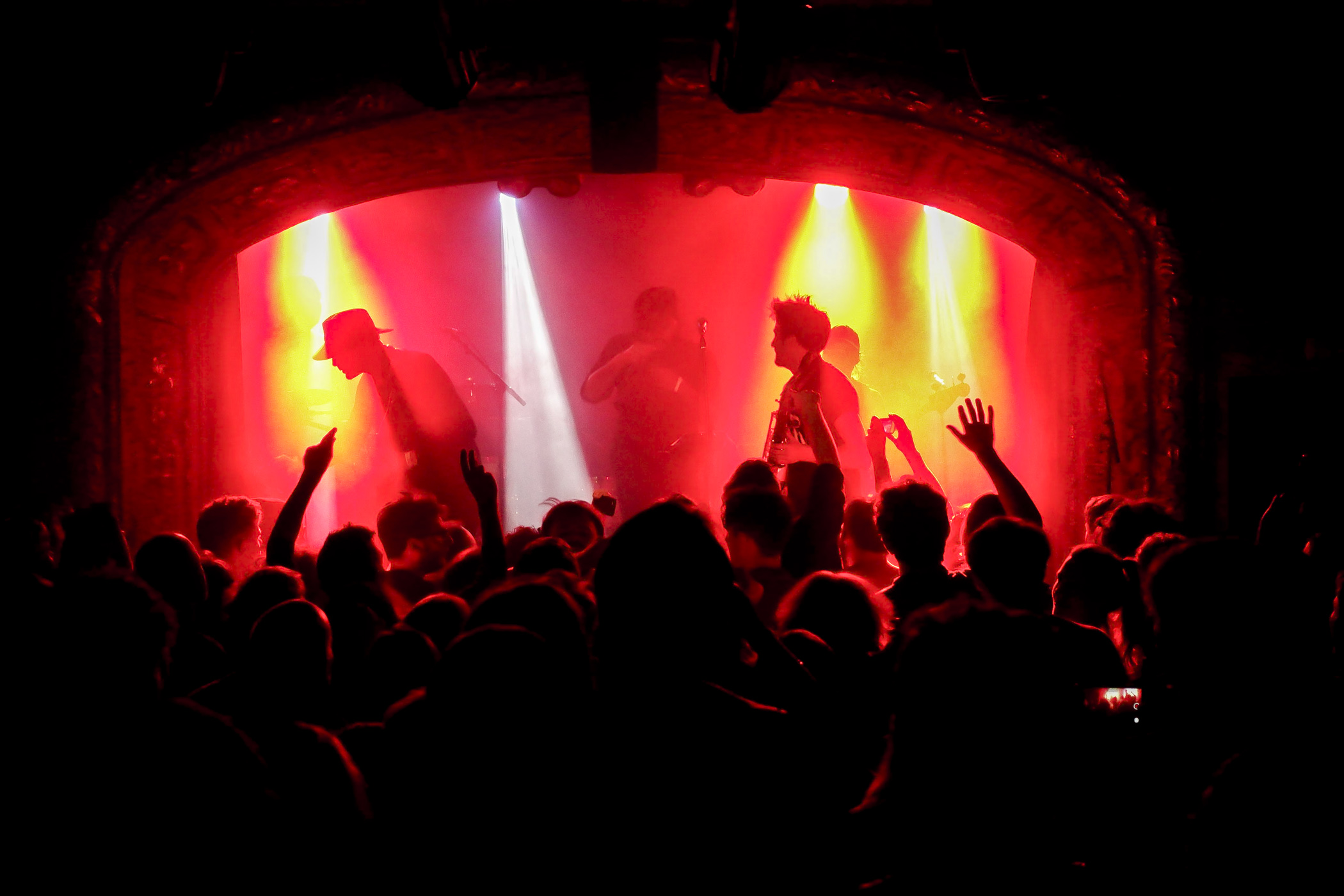
- Melt Yourself Down performing in London in November 2016

Background information
- Origin: London, United Kingdom
- Genres: Jazz, Afrobeat, Funk, Avant-Garde, Punk
- Years active: 2012–present
- Labels: The Leaf Label, Decca Records
- Members: Pete Wareham; George Crowley; Ruth Goller; Kushal Gaya; Adam Betts; Zands Duggan
- Past members: Shabaka Hutchings; Tom Skinner
- Website: www.meltyourselfdown.com

Melt Yourself Down are a London-based band who incorporate elements of West African musical styles (afrobeat), punk, jazz and funk. Founded in January 2012, the band is led by saxophonist Pete Wareham, former leader of now defunct jazz/punk band Acoustic Ladyland and saxophonist in British jazz band Polar Bear. The original line-up included saxophonist Shabaka Hutchings (Sons Of Kemet, The Comet Is Coming, The Heliocentrics), drummer Tom Skinner (Sons of Kemet, Mulatu Astatke, Hello Skinny), vocalist Kushal Gaya (Zun Zun Egui), bassist Ruth Goller (Acoustic Ladyland) and percussionist Satin Singh (Fela!, Transglobal Underground).

They were signed to The Leaf Label and released their debut album on 17 June 2013, followed by Live At The New Empowering Church on 19 April 2014. Their second studio album, Last Evenings On Earth, was released on 29 April 2016.

They signed to Decca Records in 2019 and released their third studio album 100% Yes on 27 March 2020.

== Career ==
=== Early history ===
After the break up of Acoustic Ladyland, bandleader Pete Wareham began exploring Egyptian, Nubian and other North African music. In an interview with M Magazine, Wareham explains that he included some of this music in a DJ set he was performing, and seeing the positive reaction from the crowd, decided to write and perform music in this style. He assembled the band from musicians he had worked with in various projects and collaborations, initially intending it to be an instrumental line-up. Vocalist Kushal Gaya was added to the group shortly after the initial rehearsals.

The name of the band comes from an album by James Chance, released in Japan in 1986 on Selfish Records. Wareham has stated that he contacted Chance with a request to use the name and received "his blessing" for the project. Melt Yourself Down subsequently performed with James Chance at shows in New York and London in 2014. Wareham and Chance had previously collaborated when Chance performed on a track from Acoustic Ladyland's third album, Skinny Grin.

=== Melt Yourself Down (2013) ===
In June 2013, the band released their self-titled album Melt Yourself Down, featuring the singles "We Are Enough", "Release!" and "Fix My Life". The album was produced and mixed by London-based songwriter, electronic musician, and artist Leafcutter John, who performs alongside Wareham in Polar Bear.

The album's "intense brew of jazz, punk, and African elements" has been described as "the sound of Cairo '57, Cologne '72, New York '78 and London 2013" in a review by The Daily Telegraph amongst an array of other positive reviews.

A second edition of this album was released in January 2016, as part of a series of re-releases made by The Leaf Label as part of their 20th anniversary celebrations through the Pledge Music service.

=== Live at the New Empowering Church (2014) ===
As part of Record Store Day 2014, Melt Yourself Down released the album Live at the New Empowering Church, with only 900 copies of the vinyl LP available worldwide. The album was recorded at a sold out show in Hackney, London, on 29 November 2013 and features seven tracks from the band's debut album. Melt Yourself Down saxophonist Shabaka Hutchings and bassist Ruth Goller are replaced by Wayne Francis (United Vibrations) and Leon Brichard (Ibibio Sound Machine) respectively.

=== Dot to Dot (2015) ===
On 18 November 2015, Melt Yourself Down released "Dot to Dot", the first single from album Last Evenings On Earth. A music video followed on 26 November, shot by the Diamond Bros in New York alongside photographer Vincent Laforet and Andre Constantini. The video release coincided with shows in London and Leeds as part of Leaf 20, the 20th anniversary celebrations of The Leaf Label. The track was released on 12" vinyl in January 2016, along with a remix by Italian producer DJ Khalab. The remix premiered on The Ransome Note.

=== Last Evenings On Earth (2016) ===
Melt Yourself Down's second studio album was released on The Leaf Label on 29 April 2016. The track "The God Of You" was released on 26 February as a second single, premiered on The Quietus. In an announcement by Clash, the album was described as a "blast of musical exploration" with "an apocalyptic tone". Drowned In Sound wrote that "the compositions are more complex, the music tighter and everything has an immediacy that was missing before...Last Evenings on Earth is as vast and sprawling as their self-titled debut, yet at the same time it’s concise and refined". In August 2016, Last Evenings On Earth was nominated for Best ‘Difficult’ Second Album in the AIM awards.

=== Another Weapon (2016) ===
On 12 July 2016, Melt Yourself Down announced the release of new single "Another Weapon". This "live favourite" was recorded and produced by Dan Carey (whose credits include Kae Tempest and Kylie Minogue), and was released on his Speedy Wunderground label on limited edition 7" vinyl. A stream of the track premiered on Line Of Best Fit, who described its "spidery basslines... '80s post-punk vocals and pumping percussion" as reminiscent of "Orange Juice meets New Orleans".

=== 100% Yes (2020) ===
In 2019 Melt Yourself Down signed to Decca Records and on 17 July 2019, announced the release of new single "Boot & Spleen", the first from their upcoming third studio album 100% Yes. They capped this off with a concert that evening at The Lexington in London.

Following the release of further singles "It Is What It Is", "Every Single Day", and "Crocodile", the band released "100% Yes" on 27 March 2020, which was planned to be followed by a national tour which was postponed due to the coronavirus pandemic.

== Discography ==
=== Studio albums ===
- Melt Yourself Down (2013)
- Last Evenings on Earth (2016)
- 100% Yes (2020)
- Pray for Me I Don't Fit In (2022)

=== Live albums ===
- Live at the New Empowering Church (2014)

=== Singles ===
- "We Are Enough" (2012)
- "Fix My Life" / "We Are Enough" (2013)
- "Release!" (2013)
- "Camel" (2013)
- "Dot to Dot" (2015)
- "The God of You" (2016)
- "Another Weapon" (2016)
- "Boot and Spleen" (2019)
- "Every Single Day" (2020)
- "Crocodile" (2020)
- "Pray for Me I Don't Fit In" (2021)

== Musical style and influences ==
Melt Yourself Down takes its musical interests from a diverse range of countries and cultures and has built a unique style, drawing from Egyptian and Nubian music, punk rock, jazz, psychedelic rock, electronica, funk and more. Wareham has described the style as "Nubian inspired party-punk music". In a later interview he added "The need to dance is still there but now I’m feeling inspired by the idea of the city as a prism through which all kinds of global influences pass...Translation, immigration, overcoming obstacles - and most of all, human unity."
