= Live at the New Empowering Church =

Live album by Melt Yourself Down
- Released: 19 April 2014
- Recorded: November 2013
- Genre: Punk jazz; Afrobeat
- Label: The Leaf Label
- Producer: Leafcutter John

Melt Yourself Down chronology
Melt Yourself Down (2013)	Live at the New Empowering Church (2014)	Last Evenings on Earth (2016)

Live at the New Empowering Church is a 2014 album by London-based band Melt Yourself Down. It was recorded live at The New Empowering Church in Hackney, London, and was released as part of Record Store Day 2014. It features seven tracks from the group's debut album Melt Yourself Down and was released exclusively on vinyl with only 900 copies available worldwide. The line-up on this record sees saxophonist Shabaka Hutchings and bassist Ruth Goller replaced by Wayne Francis and Leon Brichard respectively. The Leaf Label later released this record on CD, combined with the band's debut record, for a special North American release.

== Track listing ==
1. "We Are Enough" – 5:58
2. "Tuna" – 6:00
3. "Mouth to Mouth" – 4:25
4. "Kingdom of Kush" – 7:03
5. "Camel" – 7:41
6. "Fix My Life" – 4:13
7. "Release!" – 4:24

== Personnel ==
- Pete Wareham – tenor saxophone
- Kushal Gaya – vocals
- Tom Skinner – drums
- Satin Singh – percussion
- Wayne Francis – tenor saxophone
- Leon Brichard – bass guitar
