= Benji B =

British DJ, radio presenter and record producer

- Born: Benjamin Benstead; 1978 or 1979 (age 47–48); London, United Kingdom
- Occupations: DJ; radio presenter; record producer; music director
- Years active: 1998–present
- Presenting career
- Show: Benji B
- Station: BBC Radio 1
- Time slot: Wednesday night - Thursday morning 23:00 – 01:00
- Style: DJ
- Country: United Kingdom
- Website: deviationmusic.net

Benjamin Benstead, known professionally as Benji B, is a British DJ, radio presenter, and record producer. A longtime BBC Radio producer and presenter, he has presented a weekly show on BBC Radio 1 since 2010 that highlights an eclectic mix of hip-hop, R&B, and electronica. In 2018, he was appointed music director of Louis Vuitton by Virgil Abloh, having previously consulted for Kanye West and fashion brands like Celine.

== Early life ==
Benjamin Benstead was born in London to a composer and former dance teacher. He was raised between North London and South London, and attended the Hendon School until he was sixteen. He completed his A-Levels while working at Kiss FM on the weekends. As a child, he played saxophone and was in a gamelan ensemble, before becoming interested in DJ culture through pirate radio.

== Career ==
Benji B began his professional career in 1995 when, at age sixteen, he began producing Gilles Peterson's WorldWide radio program on Kiss FM and later worked as a producer under Jez Nelson; he moved to BBC Radio 1 with WorldWide in 1998. He joined BBC Radio 1Xtra as a presenter when the station launched in 2002. In September 2010, Benji B began presenting on Radio 1, taking over the 1am–3am slot Wednesday nights / Thursday mornings previously inhabited by Mary Anne Hobbs; later, his show Deviation began simulcasting to 1xtra and the BBC Asian Network. He also previously presented a weekly radio show called of the same name on Couleur 3, a national Swiss radio station.

In 2007, he founded the London club night Deviation. Deviation began a hiatus in 2017-2018.

Since the early 2010s, he has collaborated with American rapper Kanye West. He is credited as an additional producer on the track "On Sight" from Yeezus and as co-producer on the track "Fade" from The Life of Pablo. In 2019, he helped produce the inaugural Sunday Service performance at Coachella. Benji B is a credited producer on a handful of tracks by other artists including Jessie Ware.

Benji B has a well-documented history of working with fashion brands and designers. He began curating music for Savile Row runway shows before working as the music director of Céline under Phoebe Philo from 2015 to Spring 2018. In Summer 2018, he was named the music director of Louis Vuitton by longtime friend Virgil Abloh. Over the years, he has also worked with brands including Gieves & Hawkes, Supreme, Stussy, and Poiret.

In December 2020, Benji joined a band of British jazz musicians to play on the Bitches Brew-inspired, self-titled album London Brew, which is set for release on 31 March 2023 by Concord Jazz.

In August 2024, Benji performed in "We Humans are Movement" dance spectacle as a music director and a DJ with Wayne McGregor Company and a selection of young dancers at Biennale Danza during Venice Art Biennale. The show received a standing ovation.

== Personal life ==
As of 2015, Benji B has a record collection of 15,000 to 20,000 records. He is also a fan of Arsenal F.C.
