= SEED Ensemble =

British jazz ensemble

- Origin: London, United Kingdom
- Genres: Jazz
- Years active: 2016–present
- Label: Jazz re:freshed
- Members: Cassie Kinoshi; Sheila Maurice-Grey; Shirley Tetteh; Theon Cross; Miguel Gorodi; Chelsea Carmichael; Joe Bristow; Deschanel Gordon; Rio Kai; Patrick Boyle
- Past members: Joe Armon-Jones; Sarah Tandy
- Website: www.cassiekinoshi.co.uk/seed-the-band

SEED Ensemble are a 10-piece British jazz ensemble led by Cassie Kinoshi. In 2019, they were nominated for the Mercury Music Prize.

Metro has described them as part of a "new wave of British jazz". SEED Ensemble's trumpet player, Sheila Maurice-Grey also plays with Kinoshi in the groups Kokoroko and Nérija. Shirley Tetteh plays guitar for both SEED Ensemble and Nérija, while tuba player Theon Cross also plays with Shabaka Hutchings in Sons of Kemet. Maurice-Grey also collaborates with Little Simz, while former keyboardist Joe Armon-Jones plays with jazz group Ezra Collective. Completing the band are Miguel Gorodi on trumpet, Chelsea Carmichael on tenor saxophone and flute, Joe Bristow on trombone, Deschanel Gordon on piano, Rio Kai on double bass and Patrick Boyle on drums.

SEED Ensemble released their first full album, Driftglass, in 2019 on the Jazz re:freshed label. The album's nomination for the 2019 Mercury Prize led to an 85% increase in sales of their album and a 102% rise in Spotify streams, according to Music Week. Kinoshi stated that the album, for which they were nominated, was a “celebration of what it means to be a young black British person”. The album was named after Samuel R. Delany’s 1971 collection of science-fiction stories.

Driftglass was positively reviewed by The Guardian, who described the style as a fusion of "African, Caribbean, dance grooves and 60s Blue Note". Clash Magazine called the album "a bold record", and Kinoshi "a stellar instrumentalist".
