= Nala Sinephro =

Belgian experimental jazz musician (b. 1996)

- Born: 1996 (age 29–30); Brussels, Belgium
- Genres: Jazz; ambient; avant-garde jazz
- Occupation: Musician
- Instruments: Pedal harp; modular synthesiser; keyboards; piano; violin
- Years active: 2020–present
- Label: Warp
- Website: nalasinephro.com

Nala Sinephro (born 1996) is a Belgian experimental jazz musician based in London. She is best known for her ambient jazz compositions, where she predominantly plays the pedal harp, modular synthesiser, keyboards and piano.

In 2021, she released her debut studio album, Space 1.8, on Warp Records to widespread critical acclaim. The album placed highly on several music publications' end-of-year lists. Her second studio album, Endlessness, was released in September 2024 to further acclaim, likewise ending up on multiple year-end lists of 2024.

In 2025, Sinephro scored the A24 sports drama film, The Smashing Machine, starring Dwayne Johnson and Emily Blunt.

== Early life ==
Nala Sinephro spent her childhood in Belgium, growing up on the outskirts of Brussels, near a forest. Her Belgian mother was a classical piano teacher and her Martiniquan/Guadeloupean father was a jazz saxophonist.

During her teen years, Sinephro developed a tumor in her jaw. The tumor's successful removal influenced a period of hedonistic living, with Sinephro frequenting Brussels-based clubs to seek out hardcore dance music.

Initially interested in becoming a biochemist, Sinephro eventually transferred to an arts-based high school which featured a jazz department. There, she discovered the harp, which she quickly connected with. Sinephro attended Berklee College of Music in Boston for one year, dropping out after finding her job as a sound engineer provided a more practical education. She moved to London and enrolled in a second jazz college, though she quickly dropped out.

== Career ==
=== Early career ===
In London, Sinephro became a contemporary of saxophonists Shabaka Hutchings and Nubya Garcia, and the jazz improvisation collective Steam Down, where she developed a sense of individuality in her style. Sinephro began performing with Steam Down regularly, working alongside the London Contemporary Orchestra.

Beginning in June 2020, Sinephro hosted her own NTS Radio show.

=== 2018–2021: Space 1.8 ===
Sinephro began writing the songs that would appear on Space 1.8 in 2018 and 2019. Writing on piano, she would record her pedal harp and modular synthesiser parts at her home before entering Pink Bird recording studio to record with the album's collaborators, with included saxophonists Nubya Garcia and James Mollison, drummer Jake Long, and bassists Twm Dylan and Wonky Logic. Sinephro emphasized minimalism and intentionality when composing the album.

=== 2024–present: Endlessness and scoring The Smashing Machine ===
Sinephro's second studio album, Endlessness, was released on 6 September 2024. The album featured contributions from saxophonists Nubya Garcia and James Mollison; synth player Lyle Barton; drummers Natcyet Wakili and Morgan Simpson (formerly of Black Midi); flugelhornist Sheila Maurice-Grey; and multi-instrumentalist Wonky Logic.

In 2025, Sinephro scored the biographical sports drama film, The Smashing Machine, directed by Benny Safdie, and starring Dwayne Johnson and Emily Blunt. The score was released on 3 October 2025.

== Personal life ==
As of January 2022, Sinephro had lived in Tottenham, North London since 2018. She has family based in the Caribbean island Martinique. During the COVID-19 pandemic, Sinephro spent several months living on Martinique, where she developed an interest in field recordings.

== Discography ==
Studio albums

- Space 1.8 (Warp Records, 2021)
- Endlessness (Warp Records, 2024)

Film soundtracks

- The Smashing Machine (2025)

Guest appearances

- "Together Is a Beautiful Place to Be" (Nala Sinephro Remix) (2021) – Nubya Garcia
