= Melt Yourself Down (album) =

Studio album by Melt Yourself Down
- Released: 17 June 2013
- Genre: Afrobeat, punk jazz, jazz fusion, art punk
- Length: 34:00
- Label: The Leaf Label
- Producer: Leafcutter John

Melt Yourself Down chronology
Melt Yourself Down (2013)	Live at the New Empowering Church (2014)

Melt Yourself Down is the debut album of the London-based band of the same name.

== Background ==
The group is led by Pete Wareham, the ex-leader of defunct outfit Acoustic Ladyland and saxophonist in British jazz group Polar Bear. The album as released by The Leaf Label and features the singles "We Are Enough", "Release!" and "Fix My Life". Wareham spoke about the process of creating the album in an interview in an interview with Loud and Quiet:

"Normally we are more live players than we are studio players. And so, normally we would have gigged the hell out of it before recording it, but we can’t do that with brand new bands. No one is going to give you a gig without a recording; a recording isn’t going to be at its best unless you play live, so I just had to edit the tunes really hard, so that they stood up on their own [and] the writing had to be really solid…. All the rehearsals were recorded and then I chopped up the recordings of the rehearsals and then arranged the tunes and wrote them that way. I made my own demos of each one, I took the demos to the rehearsal and we recorded the rehearsal and chopped up the rehearsals"

The album was re-issued in 2015 as part of The Leaf Label's 20th anniversary celebrations, after being selected by fans. This limited edition re-release featured a variant on the original album artwork and was made available to fans via the PledgeMusic service.

== Reception ==
Professional ratings
Aggregate scores
Source	Rating
Metacritic	80/100
Review scores
Source	Rating
AllAboutJazz	4/5 stars
AllMusic	4/5 stars
The Daily Telegraph	4/5 stars
The Guardian	4/5 stars
musicOMH	4.5/5 stars
Pitchfork	6.4/10

On the Metacritic website, which aggregates reviews from critics and assigns a normalised rating out of 100, Melt Yourself Down received a score of 80, based on 1 mixed and 8 positive reviews. It was described as "The sound of Cairo ’57, Cologne ’72, New York ’78 and London 2013" and "[a] hectic and freewheeling duststorm of punk, funk, jazz and world music" by The Daily Telegraph, and "insanely full of energy and ideas, a tumultuous barrage of snaky, infectious hooks and punishingly addictive grooves" in a review by The Quietus. AllAboutJazz described the album as a "collection of songs that demands, and deserves, attention, respect, love and dancing in equal measure". The record came in at number 10 in Time Out's "40 Best Albums of 2014".

== Track listing ==
Melt Yourself Down track listing
No.	Title	Length
1.	"Fix My Life"	4:03
2.	"Release!"	4:19
3.	"Tuna"	4:27
4.	"We Are Enough"	4:34
5.	"Kingdom of Kush"	4:38
6.	"Free Walk"	3:49
7.	"Mouth to Mouth"	4:27
8.	"Camel"	5:02

== Personnel ==
- Peter Wareham – tenor saxophone
- Shabaka Hutchings – tenor saxophone
- Kushal Gaya – vocals
- Ruth Goller – bass guitar
- Tom Skinner – drums
- Satin Singh – percussion
