= Lest We Forget What We Came Here to Do =

Studio album by Sons of Kemet
- Released: 25 September 2015
- Studios: The Fish Factory, London
- Genre: Avant-garde jazz
- Length: 53:54
- Label: Naim
- Producer: Sebastian Rochford

Sons of Kemet chronology
Burn (2013)	Lest We Forget What We Came Here to Do (2015)	Your Queen Is a Reptile (2018)

Professional ratings
Review scores
Source	Rating
AllMusic	4/5 stars
Daily Telegraph	3/5 stars
The Guardian	4/5 stars
Jazzwise	4/5 stars

Lest We Forget What We Came Here to Do is the second studio album by British jazz band Sons of Kemet. The album was released on 25 September 2015 by Naim label.

== Reception ==
Simon Spreyer of AllMusic wrote, " Lest We Forget... had a tough act to follow, and in many ways this album picks up where Burn left off. Similar themes are explored but with added focus, a heightened interdependence on each other as group improvisers that makes this record feel like a rich progression. Hopefully there's more to come – the conviction of their collective sound, not to mention their popularity amongst fans not typically interested in jazz, suggests further exploration of this path could yield even more exciting results." Selwyn Harris of Jazzwise stated, "Compared to the effects-laden, dub-like studio production on Burn, Lest We Forget... benefits from a pared down, earthy ‘live’ feel although it also gains from the kind of sonic precision associated with contemporary beats and electronica in the artful hands of its producer/band member Seb Rochford. "

John Fordham of The Guardian commented, "Their sound balances ritualistic sparseness, conversational clamour and unpredictable jazz looseness." Jane Cornwell of Evening Standard noted, "An album that grabs you by the scruff then shoves you, flailing, onto the dance floor."

== Track listing ==
1. "In Memory Of Samir Awad" 8:43
2. "In The Castle Of My Skin" 5:23
3. "Tiger" 4:41
4. "Mo' Wiser" 6:15
5. "Breadfruit" 6:53
6. "The Hour Of Judgement" 2:52
7. "The Long Night Of Octavia E Butler" 4:41
8. "Afrofuturism" 9:00
9. "Play Mass" 5:03

== Personnel ==
- Theon Cross – tuba
- Shabaka Hutchings – saxophone, clarinet
- Seb Rochford – drums
- Tom Skinner – drums
