= Tom Skinner (drummer) =

English drummer (born 1980)

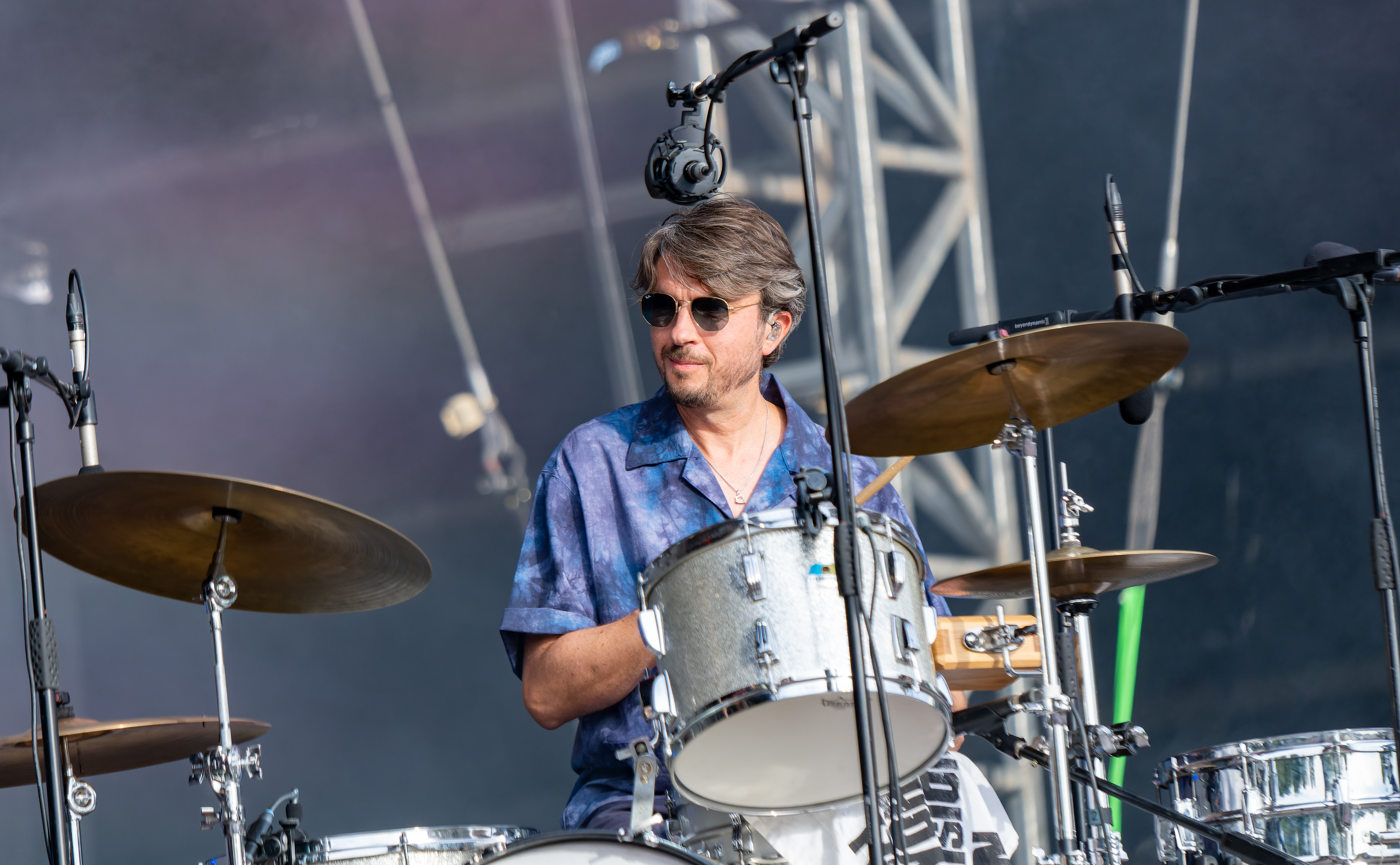
- Skinner in 2022

Background information
- Also known as: Hello Skinny
- Born: 26 January 1980 (age 46)
- Genres: Alternative rock; jazz; experimental rock; electronic
- Occupations: Musician; songwriter; producer
- Instruments: Drums; percussion
- Member of: The Smile
- Formerly of: Sons of Kemet

Tom Skinner (born 26 January 1980) is an English drummer, percussionist and record producer. He co-founded the jazz band Sons of Kemet and the rock band the Smile. He has released two albums under the name Hello Skinny. His first album under his own name, Voices of Bishara, was released in November 2022.

== Early life ==
Tom Skinner was born 26 January 1980. He began playing drums at the age of nine. He enjoyed 1990s grunge and metal bands such as Napalm Death, before discovering experimental jazz musicians such as John Zorn and Ornette Coleman.

== Career ==
=== Jazz and Sons of Kemet ===
NPR described Skinner as "the sort of drummer who always locates the pivot point between chaos and clarity". He emerged in the London jazz scene, playing with musicians including Finn Peters, Cleveland Watkiss and Denys Baptiste, and the electronic artist Matthew Herbert. He was a member of the jazz trio Zed-U and the avant-garde soul group Elmore Judd.

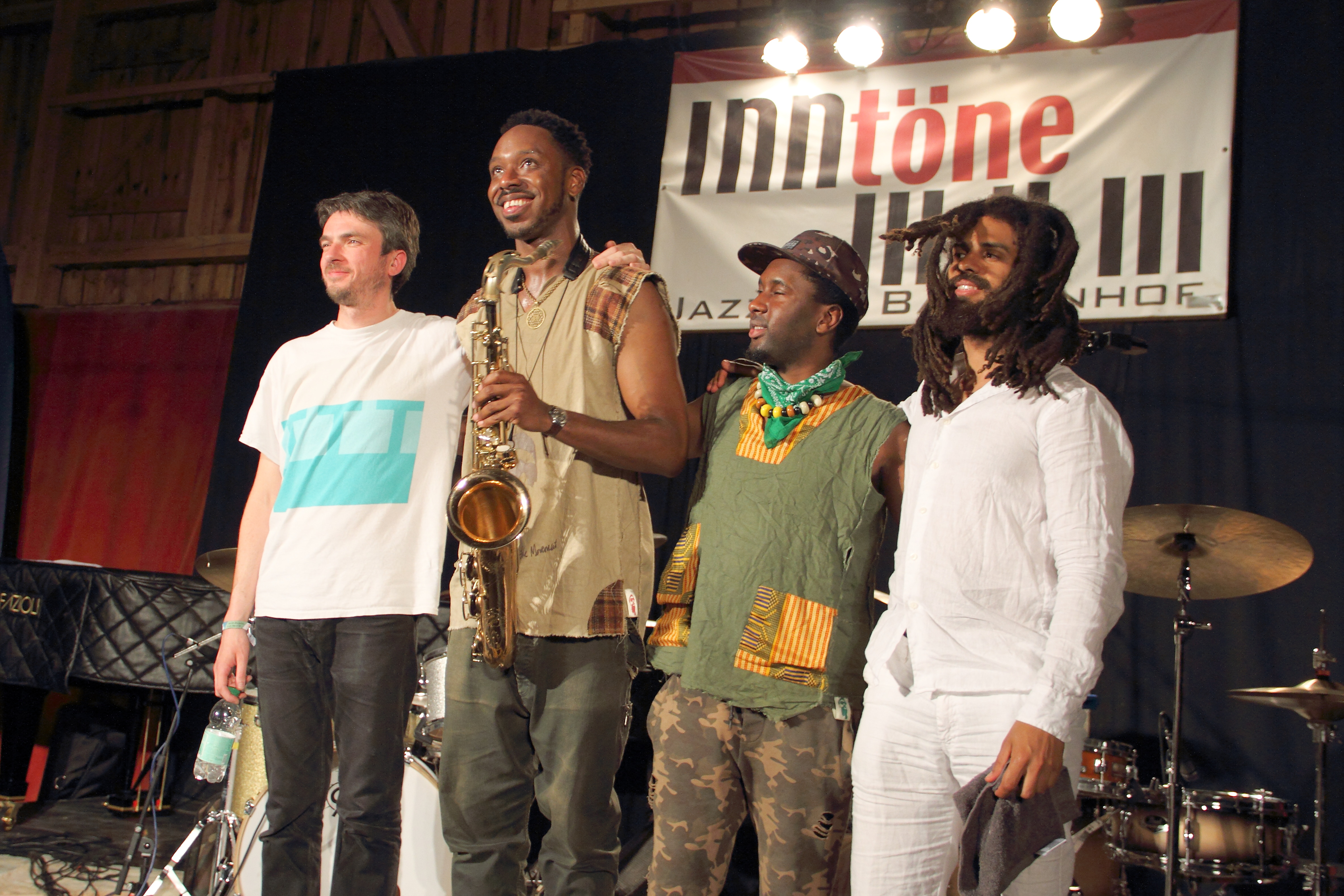
Skinner (left) with Sons of Kemet at Inntöne Jazzfestival 2018

In 2011, Skinner cofounded the jazz band Sons of Kemet. They released four albums and announced their disbandment in 2022. In December 2020, Skinner joined several British jazz musicians to record a Miles Davis tribute album, London Brew. It was released on 31 March 2023 by Concord Jazz.

=== The Smile ===
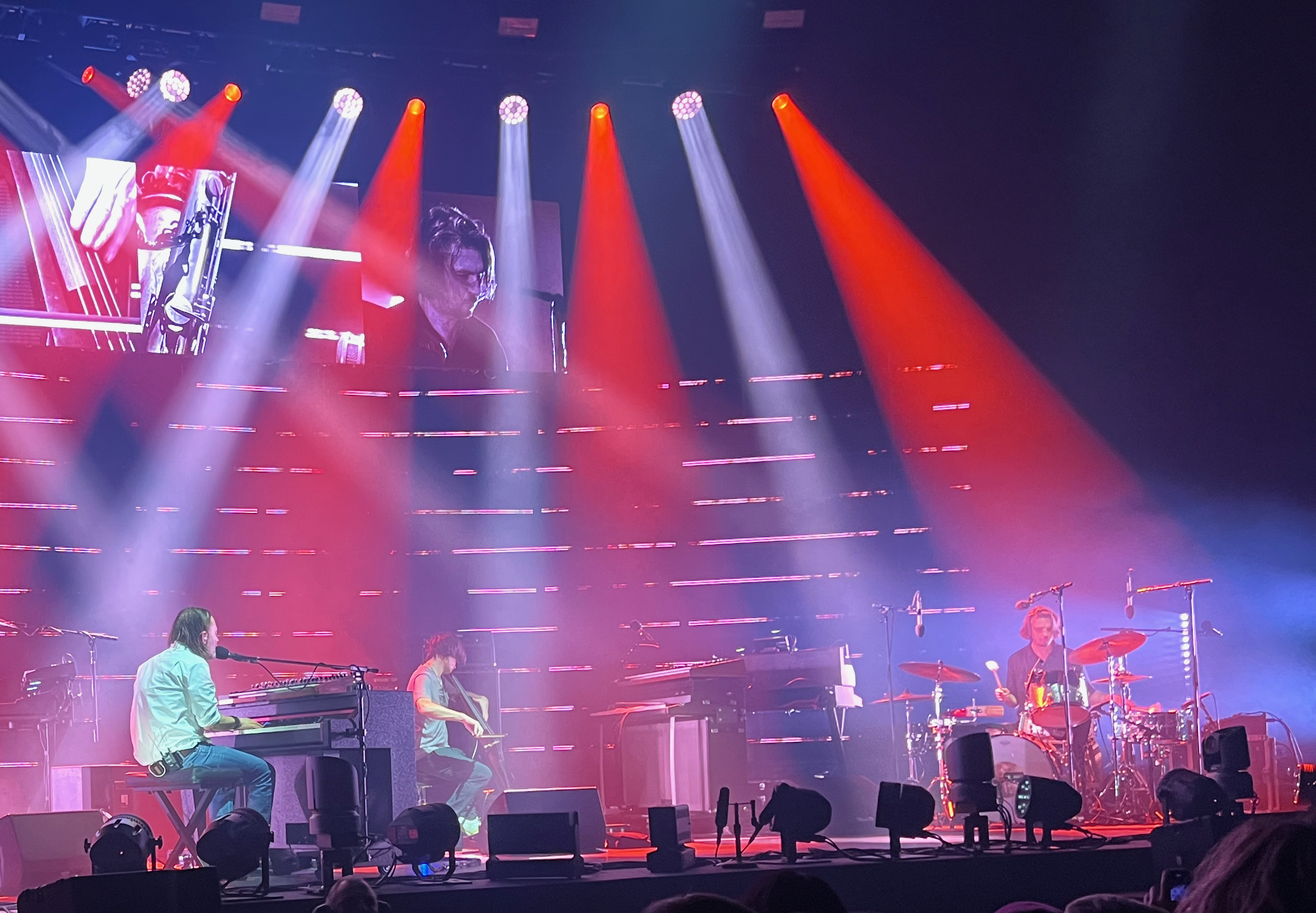
Skinner (right) performing with the Smile in 2024

Skinner first worked with the Radiohead guitarist Jonny Greenwood when he performed on Greenwood's soundtrack for the 2012 film The Master. In 2021, Skinner, Greenwood and the Radiohead singer, Thom Yorke, debuted a new band, the Smile. They made their surprise debut in a performance streamed by Glastonbury Festival that May.

In May 2022, the Smile released their debut album, A Light for Attracting Attention, and began an international tour. The second Smile album, Wall of Eyes, was released in January 2024, with a European tour that year. Their third album, Cutouts, was released in October. Skinner contributed to Yorke's soundtrack for the 2024 film Confidenza, and to the 2026 album Ranjha by Greenwood, Shye Ben Tzur and the Rajasthan Express.

=== Solo work ===
Skinner has released two albums under the name Hello Skinny. He released the first album under his own name, Voices of Bishara, on 4 November 2022. It features jazz musicians including Shabaka Hutchings, Nubya Garcia, Kareem Dayes and Tom Herbert. The first single, "Bishara", was released in September 2022. Skinner released a live version of Voices of Bishara in May 2024.

== Personal life ==
Skinner has two children and lives in North London.

== Discography ==
=== As Hello Skinny ===
- Hello Skinny (2012)
- Revolutions EP (2013)
- Watermelon Sun (2017)

=== As Tom Skinner ===
- Voices of Bishara (2022)
- Voices of Bishara Live at "Mu" (2024)
- Kaleidoscopic Visions (2025)

=== With Sons of Kemet ===
- Burn (2013)
- Lest We Forget What We Came Here to Do (2015)
- Your Queen Is a Reptile (2018)
- Black to the Future (2021)

=== With the Smile ===
- A Light for Attracting Attention (2022)
- Wall of Eyes (2024)
- Cutouts (2024)

=== With London Brew ===
- London Brew (2023)

=== With Floating Points ===
- Elaenia (2015)

=== With Wildflower ===
- Wildflower (2017)
- Love (2020)
- Better Times (2021)

=== With Beth Orton ===
- Weather Alive (2022)

=== With Alabaster DePlume ===
- Gold (2022)
- Come with Fierce Grace (2023)

=== With Owiny Sigoma Band ===
- Owiny Sigoma Band (2011)
- Power Punch (2013)
- Nyanza (2015)
- The Lost Tapes (2021)

=== With Melt Yourself Down ===
- Melt Yourself Down (2013)
- Live at the New Empowering Church (2014)
- Last Evenings on Earth (2016)

=== With David Byrne ===
- Who Is the Sky? (2025)

=== With Harry Styles ===
- Kiss All the Time. Disco, Occasionally (2026)
