= Space 1.8 =

Studio album by Nala Sinephro
- Released: 3 September 2021
- Genres: Ambient jazz; electroacoustic
- Length: 44:18
- Label: Warp
- Producer: Nala Sinephro

Nala Sinephro chronology
| Space 1.8 (2021) | Endlessness (2024) |

Space 1.8 is the debut studio album by Belgian-Caribbean musician Nala Sinephro. It was released on 3 September 2021, through Warp Records. It received widespread critical acclaim and was placed highly on several music publications' end-of-year lists.

== Composition ==
Space 1.8 is seen as a fusion of ambient music and spiritual jazz. It is also seen as an "understated" and minimalist electroacoustic work.

== Critical reception ==
Professional ratings
Aggregate scores
| Source | Rating |
|---|---|
| Metacritic | 85/100 |
Review scores
| Source | Rating |
| AllMusic | 5/5 stars |
| Mojo | 4/5 stars |
| Pitchfork | 8.3/10 |
| PopMatters | 9/10 |
| Uncut | 8/10 |

According to the review aggregator Metacritic, Space 1.8 received "universal acclaim" based on a weighted average score of 85 out of 100 from 7 critic scores.

=== Accolades ===
Publications' year-end list appearances for Space 1.8
| Critic/Publication | List | Rank | Ref |
|---|---|---|---|
| Pitchfork | The 50 Best Albums of 2021 | 24 | |

== Track listing ==
Space 1.8 track listing
| No. | Title | Length |
|---|---|---|
| 1. | "Space 1" | 4:08 |
| 2. | "Space 2" | 4:54 |
| 3. | "Space 3" | 1:15 |
| 4. | "Space 4" | 6:19 |
| 5. | "Space 5" | 4:00 |
| 6. | "Space 6" | 4:29 |
| 7. | "Space 7" | 1:41 |
| 8. | "Space 8" | 17:32 |
| Total length: | | 44:18 |

== Personnel ==
- Nala Sinephro – pedal harp, modular synths
- Lyle Barton – piano, keyboard
- Shirley Tetteh – guitar
- James Mollison – saxophone
- Nubya Garcia – saxophone
- Ahnansé – saxophone
- Jake Long – drums
- Edward Wakili-Hick – drums
- Twm Dylan – double bass
- Rudi Creswick – double bass
- Dwayne Kilvington – synth bass

== Charts ==
Chart performance for Space 1.8
| Chart (2022–2026) | Peak position |
|---|---|
| Belgian Albums (Ultratop Flanders) | 128 |
| UK Albums Sales (Official Charts) | 82 |
| UK Independent Albums (Official Charts) | 19 |
| UK Jazz & Blues Albums (Official Charts) | 6 |
