= We Are Sent Here by History =

Studio album by Shabaka and the Ancestors
- Released: 13 March 2020
- Length: 63:58
- Label: Impulse!

Shabaka and the Ancestors chronology
Wisdom of Elders (2016)	We Are Sent Here by History (2020)	Afrikan Culture (as Shabaka) (2022)

We Are Sent Here by History is a studio album by British-Barbadian musician Shabaka Hutchings, under his band Shabaka and the Ancestors. It was released on 13 March 2020 under Impulse! Records.

== Critical reception ==
Professional ratings
Aggregate scores
Source	Rating
AnyDecentMusic?	8/10
Metacritic	84/100
Review scores
Source	Rating
AllMusic	4.5/5 stars
The Guardian	4/5 stars
Pitchfork	8/10
The Skinny	3/5 stars

We Are Sent Here by History was met with universal acclaim reviews from critics. At Metacritic, which assigns a weighted average rating out of 100 to reviews from mainstream publications, this release received an average score of 84, based on 11 reviews.

As Rob Shepherd noted for PostGenre: "As much as history may have sent [the band] to this moment in time, one senses future generations will themselves be looking back to this music in forging their own artistic paths."

== Track listing ==
All tracks are written by Shabaka Hutchings and Siyabonga Mthembu.

We Are Sent Here by History track listing
No.	Title	Length
1.	"They Who Must Die"	10:10
2.	"You've Been Called"	6:29
3.	"Go My Heart, Go to Heaven"	6:41
4.	"Behold, the Deceiver"	6:01
5.	"Run, the Darkness Will Pass"	4:08
6.	"The Coming of the Strange Ones"	6:28
7.	"Beast Too Spoke of Suffering"	2:58
8.	"We Will Work (On Redefining Manhood)"	5:24
9.	"'Til the Freedom Comes Home"	7:06
10.	"Finally, the Man Cried"	5:48
11.	"Teach Me How to Be Vulnerable"	2:45

== Charts ==
Chart performance for We Are Sent Here by History
Chart (2020)	Peak position
German Albums (Offizielle Top 100)	81
Scottish Albums (OCC)	90
UK Jazz & Blues Albums (OCC)	3
US Top Contemporary Jazz Albums (Billboard)	10
US Top Tastemaker Albums (Billboard)	23
