= Limetree Festival =

Limetree Festival is a soul and jazz festival that takes place at Limetree Farm nature reserve near Grewelthorpe, North Yorkshire, England.
