= Theon Cross =

British tuba player and composer

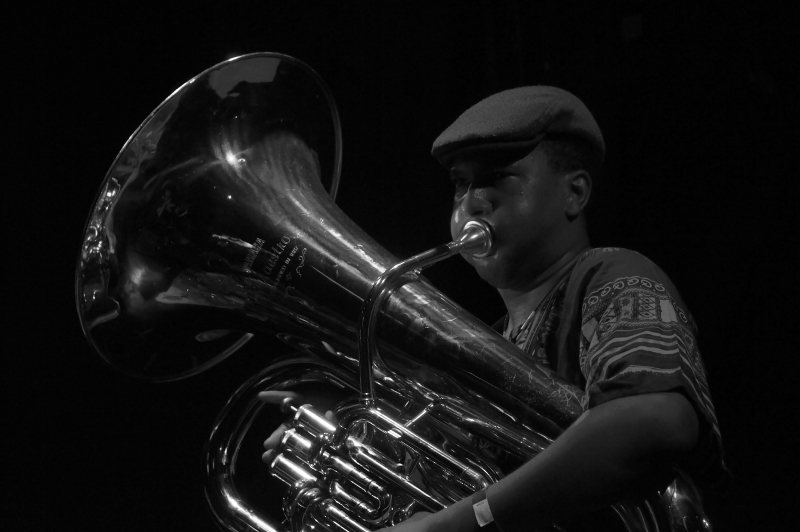
- Cross performing live on Druga godba festival in Ljubljana, Slovenia, on 30 May 2015

Background information
- Born: London, England
- Genres: Jazz
- Instruments: Tuba
- Labels: New Soil, Gearbox
- Website: theoncross.com

Theon Cross is a British tuba player and composer.

== Life and career ==
Born and raised in London, England, to a Jamaican father and Saint Lucian mother, he began taking tenor horn lessons at the age of eight, then switched to tuba when he was in his mid-teens, discovering jazz through the Tomorrow's Warriors music education programme. He studied at the Guildhall School of Music and Drama.

Cross is a core member of the jazz band Sons of Kemet. He has also worked with Moses Boyd and Nubya Garcia in his solo projects. Other collaborators include Jon Batiste, Emeli Sandé, Kano, Lafawndah and Makaya McCraven.

His solo releases include the 2015 EP Aspirations and the 2019 studio album, Fyah. On 29 October 2021, Cross released his sophomore studio album Intra-I.

== Discography ==
=== Studio albums ===
Title	Details
Fyah	Released: 15 February 2019; Label: Gearbox Records; Formats: LP, CD, digital download, streaming
Intra-I	Released: 29 October 2021; Label: New Soil Records; Formats: LP, CD, digital download, streaming

=== Extended plays ===
- Aspirations (2015)

=== Collaborative albums ===
Title	Details
Lest We Forget What We Came Here to Do (as part of Sons of Kemet)	Released: 25 September 2015; Label: Naim; Formats: LP, CD, digital download, streaming
Your Queen Is a Reptile (as part of Sons of Kemet)	Released: 30 March 2018; Label: Impulse!; Formats: LP, CD, digital download, streaming
Black to the Future (as part of Sons of Kemet)	Released: 14 May 2021; Label: Impulse!; Formats: LP, CD, digital download, streaming
Five Fruit (as part of Steam Down)	Released: 24 September 2021; Label: Decca; Formats: LP, CD, digital download, streaming
London Brew (as part of London Brew)	Released: 31 March 2023; Label: Concord Jazz

=== Singles ===
Title	Year	Album
"Forward Progression II"	2021	Intra-I
"The Spiral" (featuring Afronaut Zu and Ahnansé)	2021	Intra-I
"We Go Again"	2021	Intra-I
