= Jazz Refreshed =

British independent label based in London

- Founded: 2003
- Founder: Justin Mckenzie, Adam Moses
- Genre: Jazz
- Country of origin: United Kingdom
- Location: London
- Official website: www.jazzrefreshed.com

Jazz Refreshed (stylised as jazz re:freshed) is a contemporary jazz record label in London whose roster includes Shabaka Hutchings, SEED Ensemble, Nubya Garcia, and Rosie Turton.

== History ==
In 2017 the organisation appointed Yvette Griffith as executive director. Griffith had been with the organisation as a consultant since 2013, helping them to win Arts Council funding. In 2019, Griffith won the h100 award for services to music and was awarded an OBE in the 2024 New Years Honours List for services to Cultural Philanthropy and to Music. Griffith stepped down as CEO in 2024, after being appointed CEO of the National Youth Jazz Orchestra.

Jazz Refreshed promote and publish young British jazz musicians. They have run a showcase at the South by Southwest festival in Austin, Texas, for a number of years. Artists showcased at their 2019 SXSW event included Nerija, Joe Armon Jones, Sarah Tandy, Yussef Dayes and Ezra Collective.

Jazz Refreshed holds a weekly live residency, annual festival, and band development programmes. Their recording series 5ive showcases five tracks by a range of artists.

== Current artists ==
- Shabaka Hutchings
- SEED Ensemble
- Nubya Garcia
- Ty
