= Dave Okumu =

Austrian musician (born 1976)

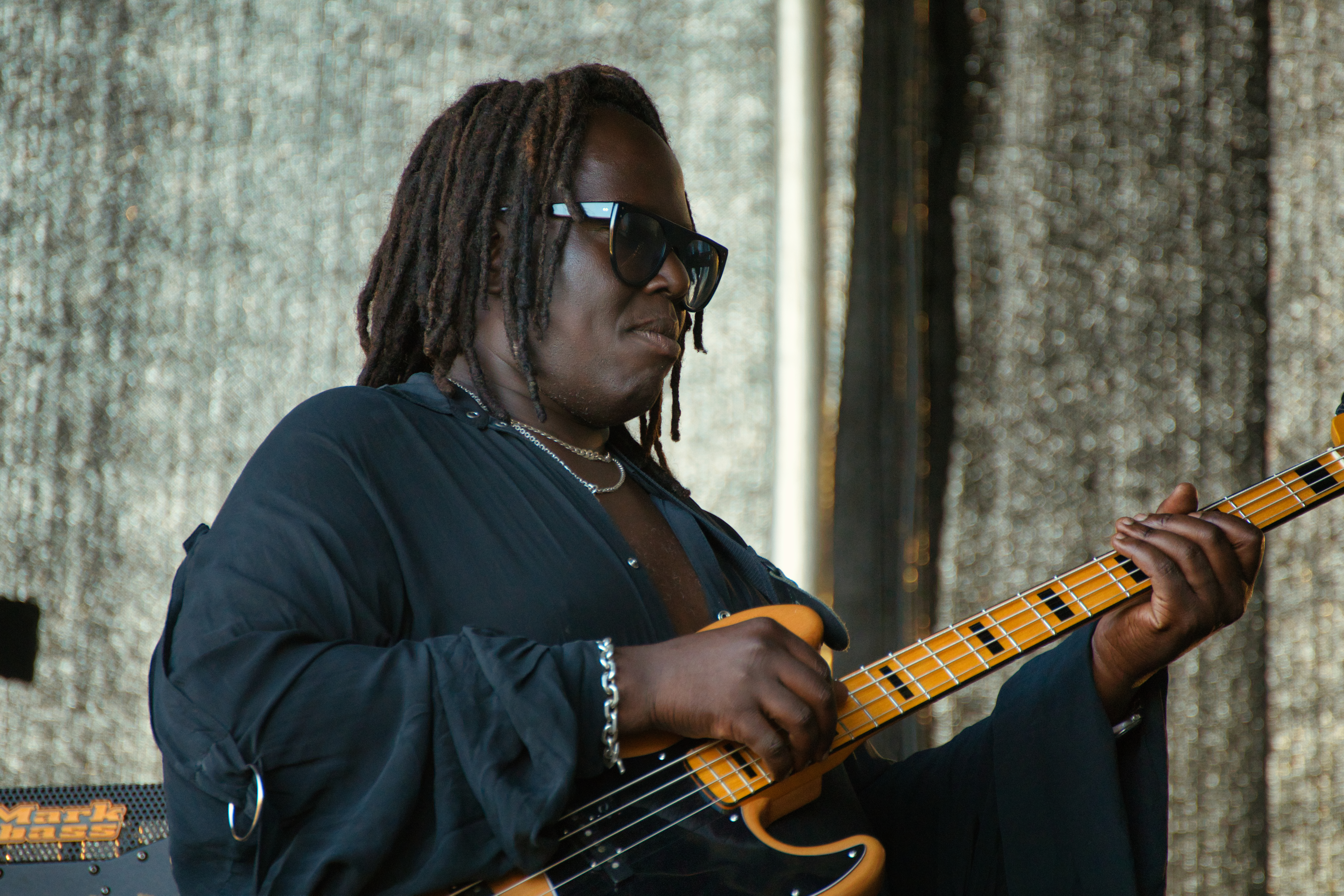
- Okumu in 2025

Background information
- Born: David Jairus Ochieng Okumu; 12 October 1976 (age 49); Vienna, Austria
- Origin: England
- Genres: Alternative rock; electronic; indie pop; trip hop
- Occupations: Musician; songwriter; producer
- Instruments: Vocals; guitar; keyboards
- Years active: 2000s–present
- Labels: Transgressive; Ninja Tune; Universal
- Member of: The Invisible

David Jairus Ochieng Okumu (born 12 October 1976) is an Austrian singer, songwriter, producer and guitarist, best known for fronting the band the Invisible. His debut album, released in March 2009, was nominated for a Mercury Prize (2009) and selected as iTunes Album of the Year.

Okumu grew up in Vienna, surrounded by music enthusiasts. He relocated with his family to the UK when he was 10. His love of music, which developed from a young age, led him to become a songwriter, producer and performing musician. He has performed and recorded with many artists, such as Robert Miles, Amy Winehouse, St. Vincent, Jamie Woon, Rosie Lowe, Jane Birkin, Sara Creative Partners, Brigitte Fontaine, Theo Parrish, Tony Allen, King Sunny Adé, Omar, Matthew Herbert, Dani Siciliano, Toddla T, Bilal, Jack De Johnette, and Anna Calvi.

Okumu began working with Jessie Ware in 2010, co-writing and producing Ware's debut album, Devotion, which was later nominated for Album of the Year (2012) by the Mercury Prize.

== Discography ==
=== With the Invisible ===
- 2009: The Invisible
- 2012: Rispah
- 2016: Patience

=== Other collaborations ===
- 2018: Undone: Live at the Crypt (as part of Okumu/Herbert/Skinner)
- 2021: The Solution Is Restless (with Joan As Police Woman and Tony Allen)
- 2023: London Brew (as part of London Brew)

=== Solo artist ===
- 2021: Knopperz
- 2023: I Came from Love (as Dave Okumu and the Seven Generations)
