= Sons of Kemet =

British jazz band (2011–2022)

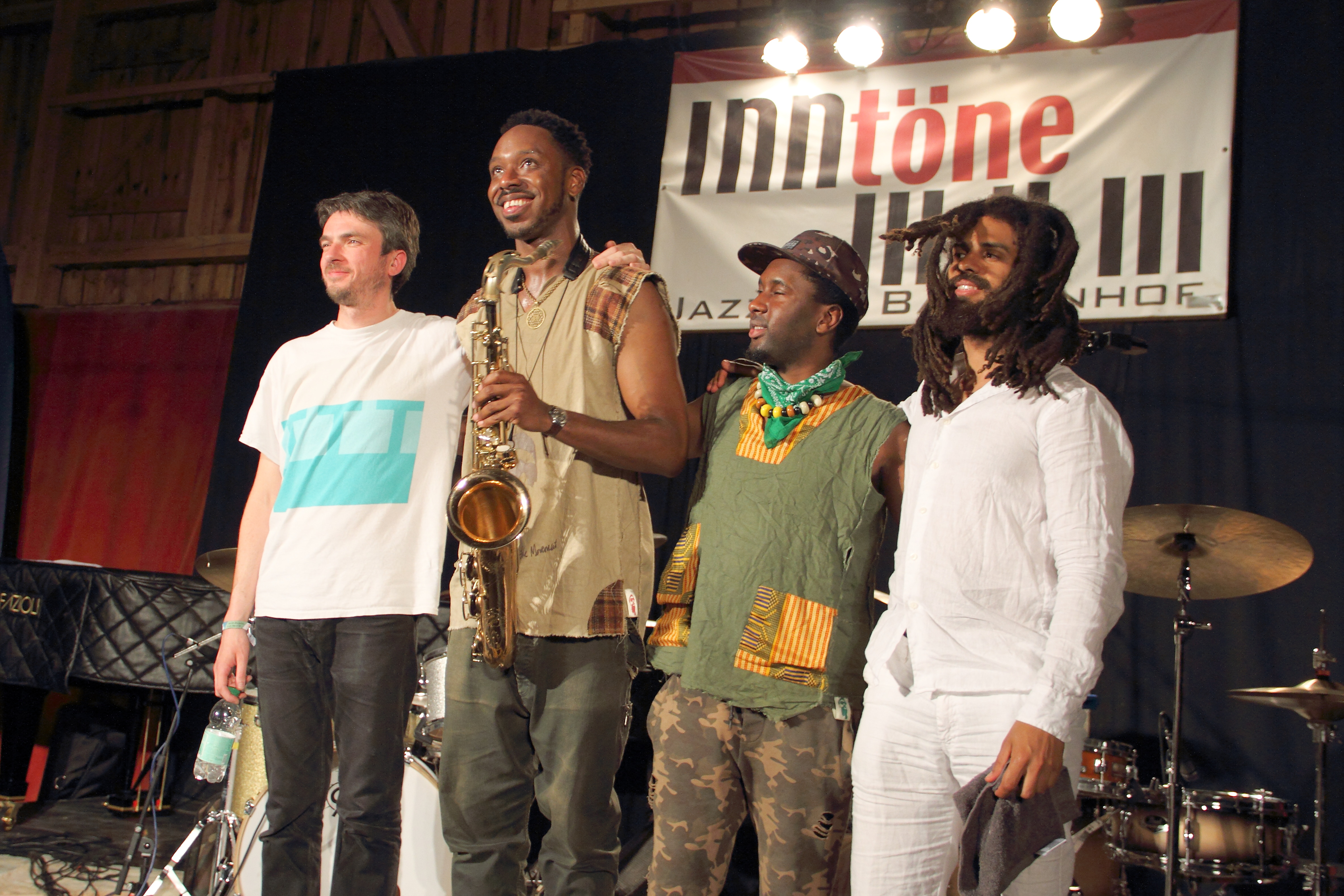
- Sons of Kemet at INNtöne 2018

Background information
- Origin: London, England
- Genres: Jazz, Afrobeat, world, avant-garde jazz
- Years active: 2011–2022
- Labels: Naim, Impulse!
- Past members: Seb Rochford; Oren Marshall; Shabaka Hutchings; Tom Skinner; Theon Cross; Eddie Hick

Sons of Kemet were a British jazz band formed by Shabaka Hutchings, Oren Marshall, Seb Rochford, and Tom Skinner. Theon Cross replaced Marshall on tuba after the first album, and Eddie Hick replaced Rochford on drums after the third. They disbanded in 2022.

== Career ==
The band used saxophone and clarinet (Hutchings), tuba (Cross), and two drummers (Skinner, Hick) to make their music and played a mixture of jazz, rock, Caribbean folk, and African music.

On 9 September 2013, Sons of Kemet released their debut album Burn, which received the Arts Desk Album of the Year 2013 and a nomination for Gilles Peterson's Album of the Year. Their next album Lest We Forget What We Came Here to Do received the same nomination for the year 2015. The band won Best Jazz Act at the 2013 MOBO Awards.

On 30 March 2018, Impulse! released the band's third album, Your Queen Is a Reptile. It was nominated for the 2018 Mercury Prize.

On 14 May 2021, the fourth album by Sons of Kemet, Black to the Future, was released. Hubert Adjei-Kontoh, writing for Pitchfork, described the album as a "propulsive mind- and body-moving record", while Kitty Empire writing for The Observer described it as "an eloquent dance between anger and joy" and praised the lyric writing and instrumentals of the album.

On 1 June 2022, they posted that after the current run of shows, "we will be closing this chapter of the band's life for the foreseeable future."

== Band members ==
Final

- Shabaka Hutchings – saxophone, clarinet
- Tom Skinner – drums
- Theon Cross – tuba
- Eddie Hick – drums

Past

- Seb Rochford – drums
- Oren Marshall – tuba

== Discography ==
- Burn (Naim, 2013)
- Lest We Forget What We Came Here to Do (Naim, 2015)
- Your Queen Is a Reptile (Impulse!, 2018)
- Black to the Future (Impulse!, 2021)

== Videography ==
Year	Title	Director	Choreographer	Ref
2016	"In the Castle of My Skin"	Motheo Moeng	Jarrel Mathebula	
2015	"Play Mass"	Jordan Copeland	Valeria Tello Giusti	

== Awards ==
- 2013 MOBO Awards – Best Jazz Act (Winner)
