= Shabaka Hutchings =

British jazz musician, composer and bandleader (born 1984)

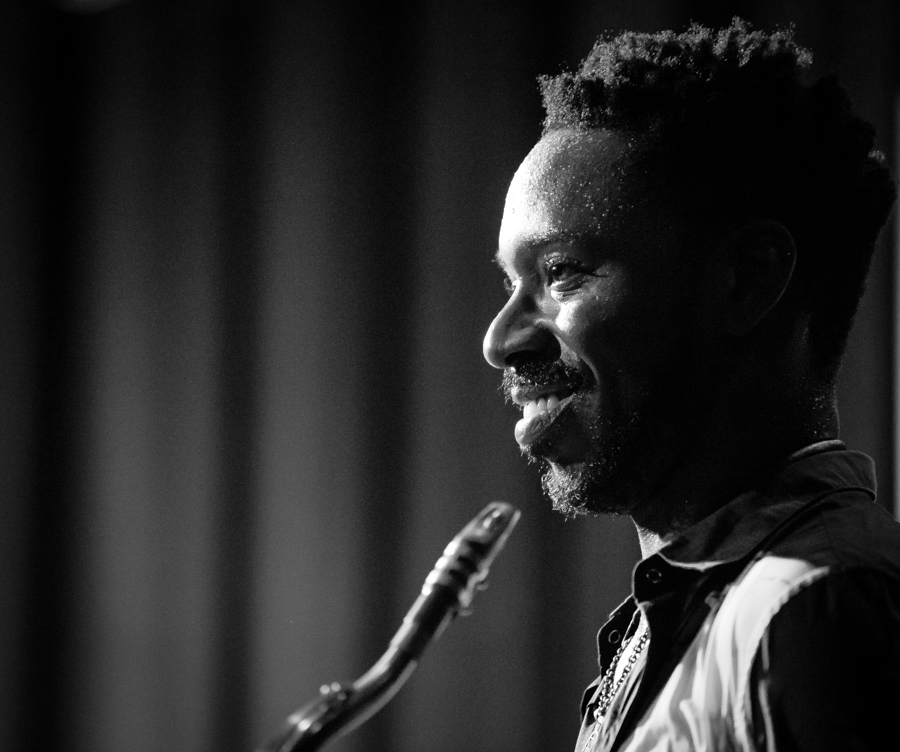
- Hutchings performing in 2018

Background information
- Born: Shabaka Akua Lumumba Kamau Iyapo Hutchings; 1984 (age 41–42); London, England
- Genres: Jazz; jazz fusion; avant-garde jazz; afrobeat; spiritual jazz; world music
- Occupation: Musician
- Instruments: Saxophone; clarinet; bass clarinet; shakuhachi; quena; pífano flute
- Years active: 2013–present
- Labels: Jazz re:freshed; Impulse!
- Formerly of: The Comet Is Coming; Melt Yourself Down; Shabaka and the Ancestors; Sons of Kemet
- Website: shabakahutchings.com

Shabaka Hutchings (born 1984), also known simply as Shabaka, is a British jazz musician, composer and bandleader. He leads the band Shabaka and the Ancestors, and formerly led Sons of Kemet before its dissolution in 2022. He was also a member of The Comet Is Coming, performing under the stage name King Shabaka. Hutchings has played saxophone and other wind instruments with the Sun Ra Arkestra, Andre 3000, Floating Points, Mulatu Astatke, Polar Bear, Melt Yourself Down, Heliocentrics, London Brew, Turnstile and Zed-U.

== Background and early years ==
Hutchings was born in 1984 in London, England, but moved to Birmingham at the age of two. From the age of six, he was raised in his parents' native Barbados. There, as a nine-year-old, he picked up the clarinet and practised along to the hip hop verses of Nas, Notorious BIG and Tupac, as well as the rhythms of Crop Over. Hutchings' father, Anum Iyapo, is a graphic designer who worked on albums by artists including King Tubby and Jah Shaka, and recorded a reggae poetry album called Song of the Motherland in 1985.

Returning to England, at the age of 19 he went to the Guildhall School of Music and Drama, where he received a classical-music degree on the clarinet. In London, he joined the Tomorrow's Warriors programme, a blues workshop led by British bassist Gary Crosby, Janine Irons and expat New Orleans trumpeter Abram Wilson, where Hutchings met many of his future collaborators in the burgeoning South East London jazz scene.

Hutchings was a BBC New Generation Artist from 2010 to 2012. He has also spent time in South Africa.

== Career ==
Hutchings and many of his contemporaries shrug off the "jazz" label, eschewing the restriction especially as the many groups reflect influences ranging from acid house and drum & bass, to hiphop and soca, with less of a blues influence than jazz, which reviewers have noted marks a distinction between the London scene as represented by Hutchings and American jazz music.

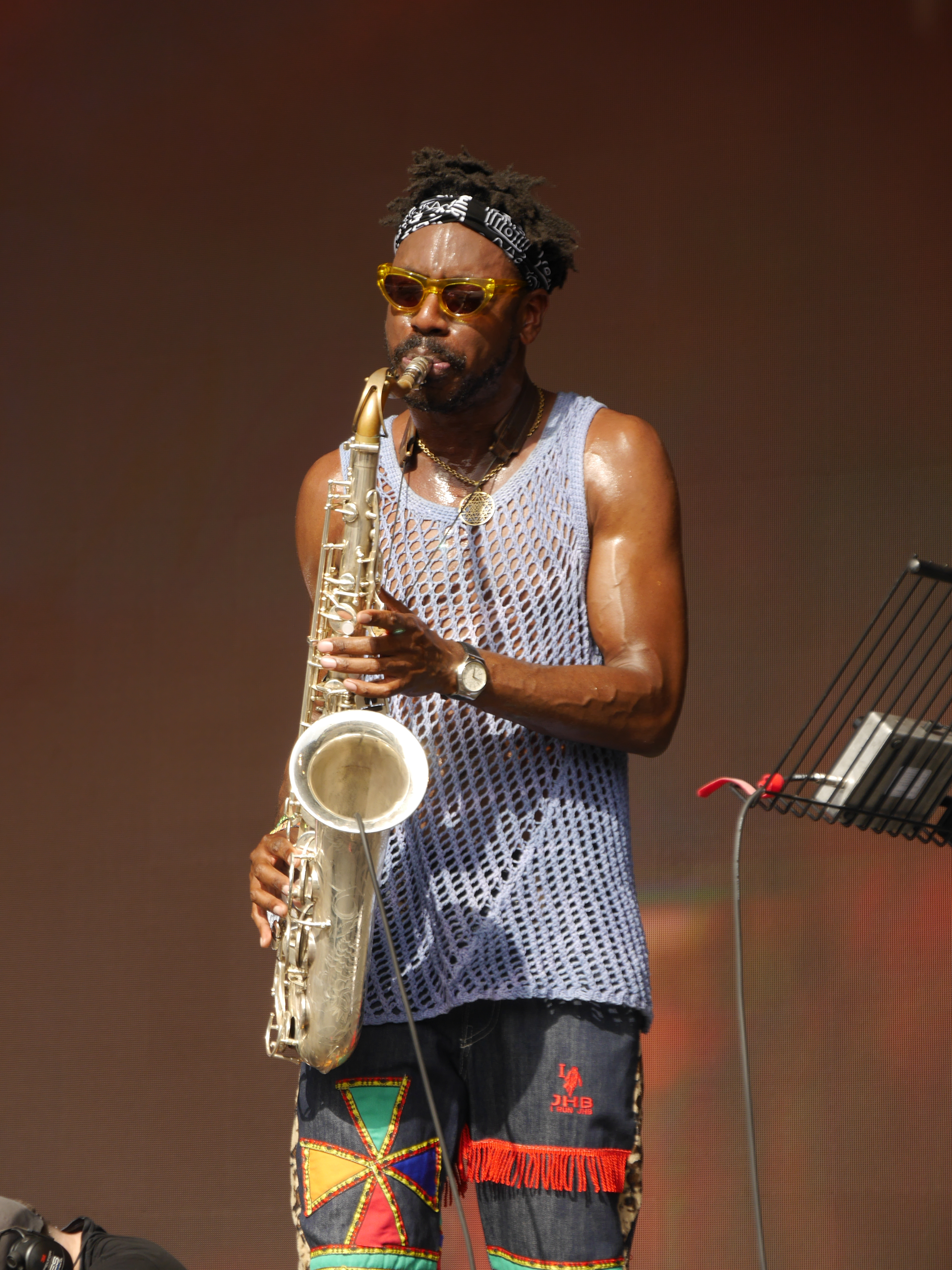
Hutchings with The Comet Is Coming, Glastonbury Festival, 2019

Shabaka and the Ancestors debuted in 2016 with the album Wisdom of Elders on Gilles Peterson's Brownswood Recordings label. The Comet Is Coming, a trio with keyboardist Dan Leavers and drummer Max Hallett, received a Mercury Prize nomination for their debut album Channel the Spirits, released on The Leaf Label in April 2016. Sons of Kemet, a quartet of saxophone, tuba and two drummers, launched with the album Burn in 2013, followed up with Lest We Forget What We Came Here to Do in 2015, both on the Naim Jazz label, before moving to Impulse! for Your Queen Is a Reptile in 2018, which coincided with a breakout into wider public consciousness of the UK jazz scene, captured by the attention on the Hutchings-directed compilation We Out Here on Brownswood. In November the same year, Hutchings curated part of the programme for the Dutch Le Guess Who? festival.

In March 2020, Shabaka and the Ancestors released We Are Sent Here by History under Impulse! Records. Hutchings was due to take part in a series of concerts to commemorate the 50th anniversary of Miles Davis' Bitches Brew, but these were cancelled due to the COVID-19 pandemic. Instead, a group was assembled under the name London Brew in December 2020 to record an improvised set inspired by the 1970 album. This would go on to be released in March 2023.

Also in 2020, Hutchings launched the London-based record label Native Rebel Recordings. The idea for the label was conceived by Hutchings and music industry publisher Matt Smith. Hutchings drew inspiration from ECM Records, its founder Manfred Eicher, and the idea that a label could have an overriding aesthetic. All of the label's releases are recorded at RAK Studios over a three-day period, with rehearsal incorporated into that time in order to emphasize first experiences with the music. The label has released albums from such artists as Chelsea Carmichael, Confucius MC and Kwake Bass, the Brother Moves On, Ganavya Doraiswamy, and Kofi Flexxx. The label also released a 10th anniversary reissue of Sons of Kemet's Burn, and a remaster of the 1985 album Song of the Motherland by Hutchings' father AnkAnum.

In May 2022, Hutchings released his debut solo EP, Afrikan Culture, under the mononym Shabaka. On New Year's Day in 2023, Hutchings issued a statement on his Instagram page, that he would take a hiatus from playing the saxophone from the end of 2023. He later clarified his reasons for doing so, citing the physical and emotional strain that comes from performing on the saxophone on tour. By 2026, he had returned to playing the saxophone.

Hutchings' album Perceive Its Beauty, Acknowledge Its Grace was released in April 2024 by Impulse!

== Awards and honours ==
Hutchings has won a MOBO Award for best jazz act with the Sons of Kemet in 2013, the Paul Hamlyn Composer Award in 2014, and Jazz Innovation awards from Jazz FM.

== Discography ==
=== Leader/Coleader ===
- 2009 – Night Time on the Middle Passage (Babel Label, 2009) (Zed-U) – Reissued on Bandcamp
- 2013, February – Burn (Naim Records, 2013) (Sons of Kemet)
- 2013 – Melt Yourself Down (The Leaf Label, 2013) (Melt Yourself Down)
- 2015 – Lest We Forget What We Came Here to Do (Naim Records, 2015) (Sons of Kemet)
- 2015 – The Raging of the Time (Bruce's Fingers, 2015) (SFS) – Reissued on Bandcamp
- 2015, July – Wisdom of Elders (Brownswood Recordings, 2016) (Shabaka & the Ancestors)
- 2016 – Last Evenings on Earth (The Leaf Label, 2016) (Melt Yourself Down)
- 2016 – Channel the Spirits (The Leaf Label, 2016) (The Comet Is Coming) – Reissued by Leaf/Revolver
- 2017 – A.R.E. Project (Bandcamp, 2017) (Hieroglyphic Being, Sarathy Korwar, Shabaka Hutchings)
- 2018 – Your Queen Is a Reptile (Impulse!, 2018) (Sons of Kemet)
- 2019 – Trust in the Lifeforce of the Deep Mystery (Impulse!, 2019) (The Comet Is Coming)
- 2019 – The Afterlife (Impulse!, 2019) (The Comet Is Coming as King Shabaka)
- 2020 – We Are Sent Here by History (Impulse!, 2020) (Shabaka & the Ancestors)
- 2020, December – London Brew (Concord Records, 2023) (London Brew)
- 2021 – Black to the Future (Impulse!, 2021) (Sons of Kemet)
- 2022 – Hyper-Dimensional Expansion Beam (Impulse!, 2022) (The Comet Is Coming as King Shabaka)
- 2023 – Afrikan Culture (Impulse!, 2023)
- 2024 – Perceive Its Beauty, Acknowledge Its Grace (Impulse!, 2024)
- 2026 – Of The Earth (Shabaka Recording, 2026)

=== Sideman ===
- 2017 – Day to Day (Ninja Tune, 2017) (Sarathy Korwar)
- 2017 – La Saboteuse (Naim Records, 2017) (Yazz Ahmed)
- 2017 – Unit(e) (Alexander Hawkins Music, 2017) (Alexander Hawkins) – Reissued on Bandcamp
- 2017 – The Sunshine Makers (Soundway Records, 2017) (The Heliocentrics)
- 2021 – The Rich Are Only Defeated When Running for Their Lives (Heavenly Sweetness, 2021) (Anthony Joseph) – Featured on tracks "Kamau" and "Swing Praxis"; reissued on Bandcamp
- 2022 – Break a Vase (Intakt Records, 2022) (Alexander Hawkins Mirror Canon)

=== As featured artist ===
- 2014 – Soho Live (33 Records, 2014) (Shez Raja Collective) – Featured on track "Adrenalize"
- 2017 – Starship / Can I Know You (Wormfood Records, 2017) (Afriquoi) – Featured on track "Starship"; reissued on Bandcamp
- 2017 – Arise (Brownswood Recordings, 2017) (Zara McFarlane) – Featured on track "Silhouette"
- 2018 – Universal Beings (International Anthem, 2018) (Makaya McCraven) – Featured on tracks 7–11
- 2019 – Celia (Verve Records, 2019) (Angélique Kidjo) – Featured on tracks 7–11
- 2021 – Yellow Ochre (Rhythm Section International, 2021) (Vels Trio) – Featured on track "40 Point"; reissued by Total Refreshment Centre on Bandcamp
- 2021 – Shout Out! To Freedom... (Warp Records, 2021) (Nightmares on Wax) – Featured on tracks "3D Warrior" and "Wonder"; reissued on Bandcamp
- 2023 – Black Classical Music (Brownswood Recordings, 2023) (Yussef Dayes) – Featured on track "Raisins Under the Sun"; reissued on Bandcamp
