= Liam Noble (musician) =

British jazz pianist, composer, and educator

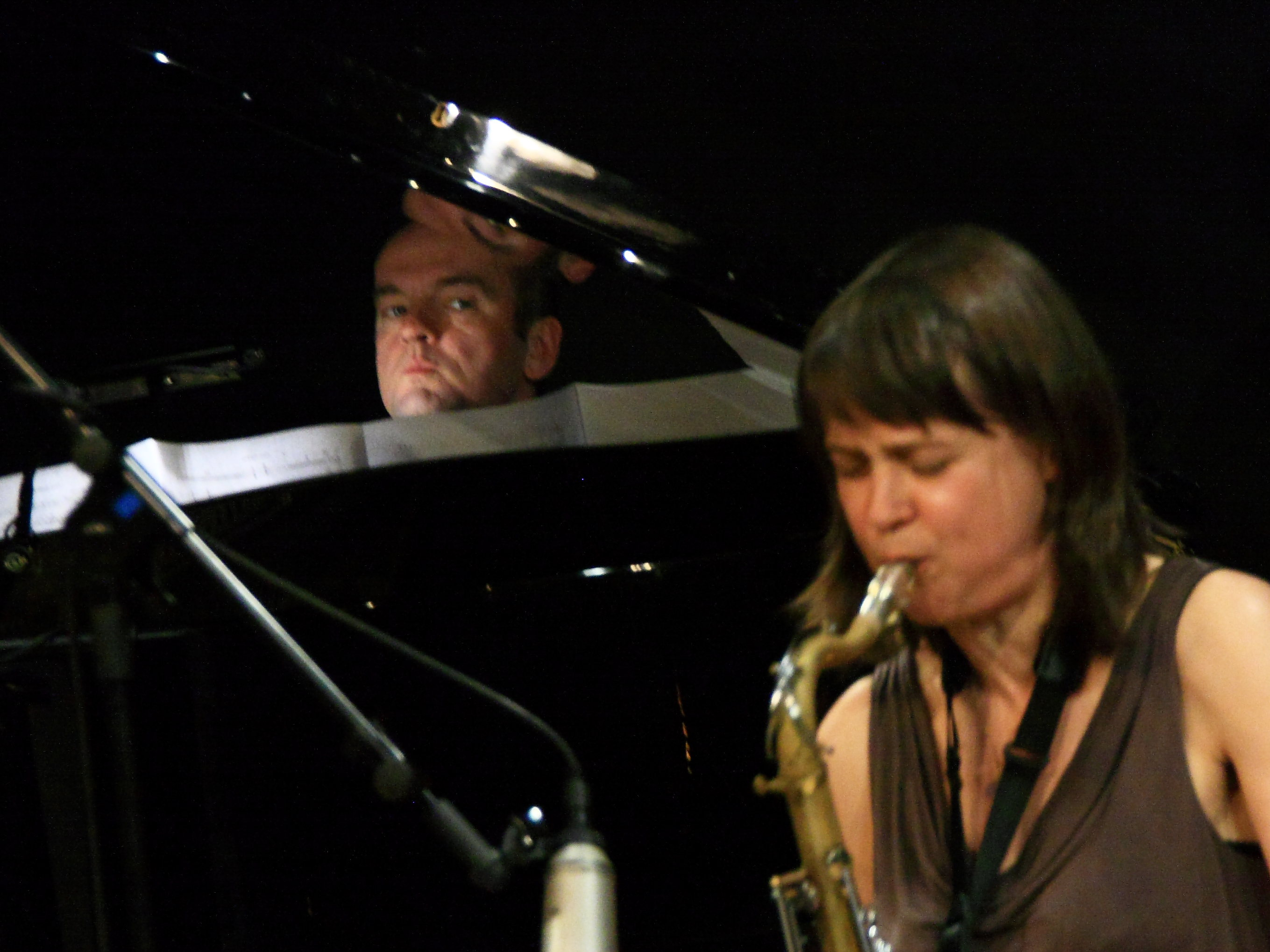
- Noble with Ingrid Laubrock at Niederstetten, Germany in 2011

Background information
- Born: 15 November 1968 (age 57); London, UK
- Genre: Jazz
- Occupations: Musician, composer, arranger, educator
- Instrument: Piano
- Years active: 1990s–present
- Website: liamnoble.co.uk

Liam Noble (born 15 November 1968) is a British jazz pianist, composer, arranger and educator.

== Early life ==
Noble was born in London on 15 November 1968. He studied music at the University of Oxford and the postgraduate level at the Guildhall School of Music.

== Later life and career ==
After his studies, Noble played with saxophonist Stan Sulzmann in duo and quartet performances. He then played in several bands, including those led by Harry Beckett, John Stevens and Anita Wardell. In 1997, Noble joined Bobby Wellins' band. In 2002, he received a commission from Birmingham Jazz to write a song cycle.

Noble's 2004 recording Romance Among the Fishes was a quartet album, with Phil Robson (guitar), Drew Gress (bass) and Tom Rainey (drums). Noble and Robson had often played together, but the four had been put together earlier the same year for an appearance at the Cheltenham Jazz Festival. Noble's 2009 trio album, Brubeck, was described by the dedicatee, Dave Brubeck, as "an inspiration and a challenge for me to carry on in the avenues that you [Noble] have opened". In 2010, Noble accompanied vocalist Christine Tobin on the album Tapestry Unravelled, a reworking of Carole King's Tapestry from four decades earlier. In 2015, Noble will release the solo piano album A Room Somewhere.

Noble teaches at the Royal Academy of Music, Trinity Laban, the Birmingham Conservatoire and the University of Kent.

== Compositions ==
Critic John Fordham, writing in 2005, commented that "Noble likes a mixture of staccato, drily witty themes that suggest a collision of Steve Coleman and Django Bates with Wayne Shorter – and with Canadian piano guru Paul Bley in the quieter episodes".

== Discography ==
An asterisk (*) indicates that the year is that of release.

=== As leader/co-leader ===
Year recorded	Title	Label	Personnel/Notes
1994	Close Your Eyes	FMR	Solo piano
2001*	In the Meantime	Basho	Quintet, with Stan Sulzmann (tenor sax, soprano sax, flute), Chris Biscoe (alto sax, soprano sax, alto clarinet), Mick Hutton (bass), Paul Clarvis (drums)
2004	Romance Among the Fishes	Basho	Quartet, with Phil Robson (guitar), Drew Gress (bass), Tom Rainey (drums)
2006*	Let's Call This...	Babel	Duo, with Ingrid Laubrock (sax)
2009*	Brubeck	Basho	Trio, with Dave Whitford (bass), Dave Wickins (drums)
2010*	Tapestry Unravelled	Trail Belle	Duo, with Christine Tobin (vocals)
2015*	A Room Somewhere	Basho	Solo piano
2015	The Day I Had Everything	Edition	As "Malija"; trio, with Mark Lockheart, Jasper Høiby
2017	Instinct	Edition	As "Malija"; trio, with Mark Lockheart, Jasper Høiby
2017	Brother Face	Own release on Bandcamp	With Shabaka Hutchings; in concert
2019	The Long Game	Edition	With Tom Herbert, Seb Rochford
2020	Climbing in Circles	Ubuntu	With Matthew Herd, Will Glaser
2023	Lucky Teeth	FMR	Duo, with Geoff Simkins
2024	Disappearing Worlds	FMR	With John Edwards, Mark Sanders, Paul Dunmall
2026	Distant Plains	Caliban Sounds	Duo, with Alcyona Mick (piano)

=== As sideman ===
Year recorded	Leader	Title	Label
1994	Moondog	Sax Pax for a Sax	Atlantic
1998	Harrison Smith	Outside Inside	Slam
1998–99	Tim Whitehead	Personal Standards	Home Made
1999	Trevor Lines	The Cats Hide Under the Bed When I Play My Gary Windo Records	Wriggly Pig
2000	Arnie Somogyi	Cold Cherry Soup	Forged
2000	Bobby Wellins	The Best Is Yet to Come	Jazzizit
2004*	Crass Agenda	Savage Utopia	Exitstencil Sound
2007	Tim Whitehead	Too Young to Go Steady	Home Made
2007	Ingrid Laubrock	Sleepthief	Intakt
2008*	Christine Tobin	Secret Life of a Girl	Babel
2009	Mark Lockheart	In Deep	Edition
2010	Julian Siegel	Urban Theme Park	Basho
2010	Ingrid Laubrock	The Madness of Crowds	Intakt
2011	Ingrid Laubrock	Zurich Concert	Intakt
2011*	Zhenya Strigalev	Smiling Organizm	Whirlwind
2012*	Rachel Musson	Tatterdemalion	Babel
2013	Alex Garnett	Andromeda	Whirlwind
2014*	Jim Rattigan	Triplicity	Pavillon
2019	Mark Lockheart	Days on Earth	Edition

Main source:
