= Raymond MacDonald =

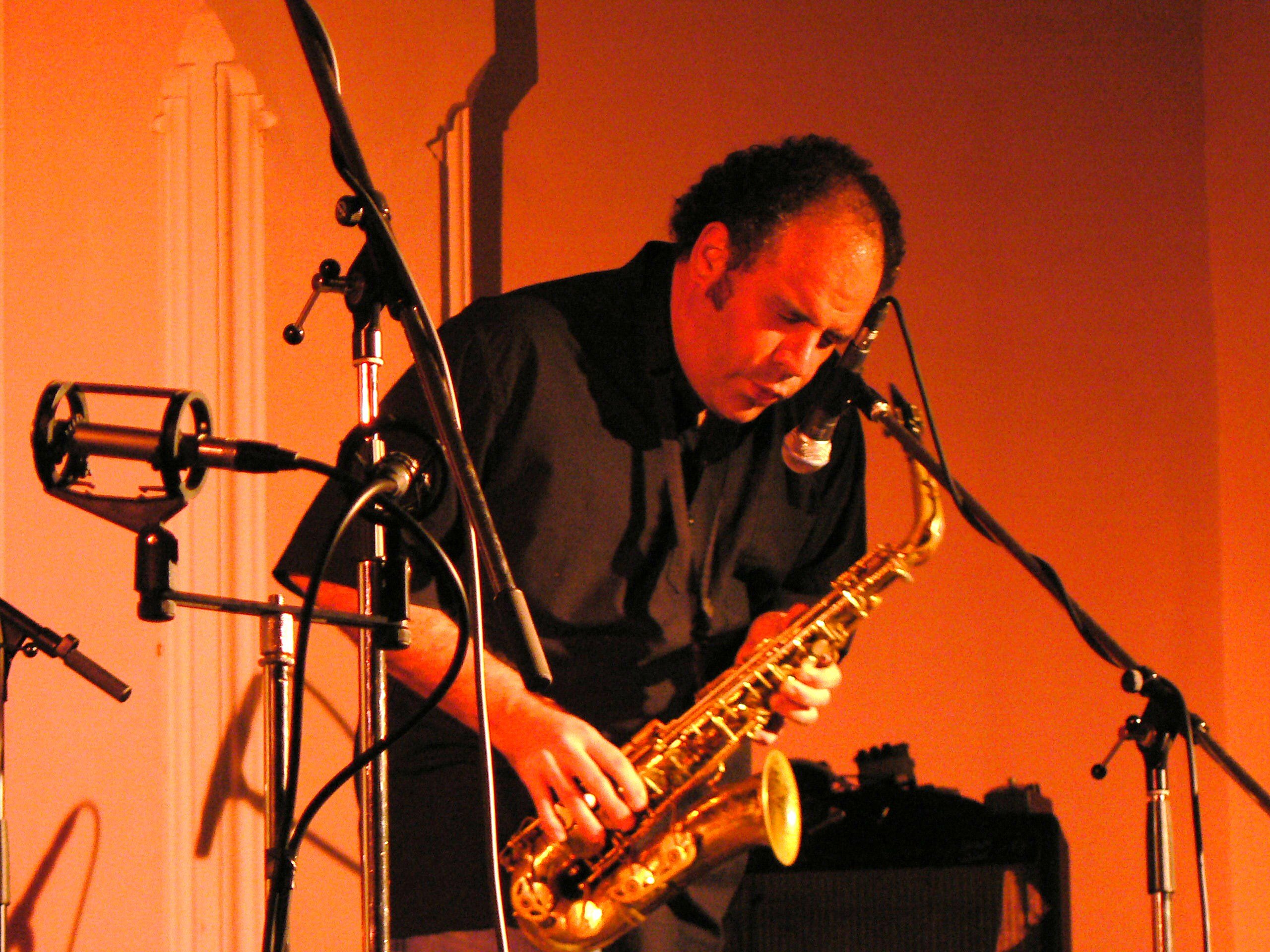

Background information
- Origin: Glasgow
- Occupations: Musician, academic
- Instrument: Saxophone
- Years active: 1985-present
- Website: https://raymondmacdonald.co.uk

Raymond MacDonald is a saxophonist, composer and psychologist with an extensive career in music, cross-disciplinary arts and academia. Much of his work explores the boundaries and ambiguities between what is conventionally seen as improvisation and composition. As a saxophonist and composer, MacDonald has released over 60 CDs, toured and broadcast worldwide and has composed music for film, television, theatre, radio and art installations. He is currently Professor of Music Psychology and Improvisation at Edinburgh University and his recent book, The Art of Becoming: How Group Improvisation Works (co-authored with Graeme Wilson) explores the nature of improvisation. MacDonald has also co-edited five texts and published over 80 academic papers and book chapters.

== Early life and education ==
MacDonald was born in Glasgow (Scotland) to a family steeped in the arts (his father Hamish MacDonald was a contemporary artist) and studied at Glasgow University, where he obtained a PhD in psychology studying the therapeutic effects of music for individuals with learning difficulties. After completing his PhD, MacDonald worked as artistic director for Limelight, a music production company specialising in training and developmental opportunities for people with impairments.

== Career as a musician ==
MacDonald's work is informed by a view of improvisation as a social, collaborative and uniquely creative process that provides opportunities to develop new ways of engaging musically. He plays in many collaborative free improvisatory contexts, and his roots in jazz and pop music can be heard across all areas of his performance and composition. His unique approach of combining music and psychology and incorporating other artistic disciplines has been used to develop collaborative projects and ongoing working relationships around the world. He began his performing career playing guitar in Remember Fun, as part of the indie scene in Glasgow in the late 1980s and moved into jazz playing with saxophone quartet The Hung Drawn Quartet and a jazz trio, Another Hairdo.

MacDonald has collaborated with musicians across the spectrum of international contemporary music, such as Marilyn Crispell, George Lewis, David Byrne, Jim O'Rourke, Damo Suzuki, Kang Tae Hwan, Axel Dorner, Tatsuya Nakatani, Tony Buck, Michael Zerang, Fred Lonberg-Holm, Satoko Fujii and Natsuki Tamura. His list of UK collaborators is equally extensive, and includes Evan Parker, Nurse with Wound, Fred Frith, Keith Tippett, Barry Guy, Harry Beckett, Keith Rowe, Lol Coxhill, Maggie Nicols, Steve Noble, Steve Beresford, the London Improvisers Orchestra (LIO), and Future Pilot A.K.A. He is a founding member of the Glasgow Improvisers Orchestra (GIO) and co-leads the George Burt-Raymond MacDonald Quartet. He plays with Alister Spence and Sia Xray in Sensaround and has long standing duo partnerships with Marilyn Crispel and Gunter "Baby" Sommer.

MacDonald instigates and collaborates on cross-disciplinary projects and has worked with visual artists, dancers, writers and filmmakers. Cross-disciplinary projects include collaborations with Christine Borland, Simon Starling, Martin Boyce, Douglas Copland, a BBC Radio 3 commission Between the Ears for Burt-MacDonald Quintet (BMacD5), and an ongoing collaboration Scarecrows & Lighthouses with Boyce and David Mackenzie. MacDonald has also worked with Mackenzie on film soundtracks, including Young Adam (2003), Outlaw King (2018) and short film What is Essential? that debuted on Netflix as part of their anthology series Homemade, (2020). Other contributions to music for film and TV include soundtracks for Nicolas Winding Refn's Valhalla Rising (2010), and Scottish Television series Taggert.

=== Selected collaborative projects ===
- This is not improvised but that is: Lockdown 2020 (2020), with daughters Eva and Maria. Broadcast as part of Improvfest 2020, hosted International Institute for Critical Studies in Improvisation, Guelph, Canada.
- Theatre of the Home (2021), with Maria Sappho
- Duet for two people who have never met (2020), with Rachel Joy Weiss.
- Return to Y'Hup: The world of Ivor Cutler (2020), a reimagining of the first release by Scottish poet and composer Ivor Cutler. Co-created with Matt Brennan and Malcolm Benzie.
- Still My Sleepy Fortunes (2019), new work commissioned by Creative Scotland to mark the centenary of Scottish writer Muriel Spark.
- Silent Music | Seeing Sound (2019), exhibition of graphic scores at The Royal Scottish Academy with ongoing collaborator Jo Ganter (visual artist and print maker).
- Together (2017), a new score commissioned by PRS Foundation with musician Christian Ferlaino for Lorenza Mazzetti's 1956 silent film.
- Glasgow Improvisers Orchestra, founding member (2002–present)
- Guitar and Saxophone duo with musician Jer Reid

== Discography ==
=== Albums ===
List of studio albums, with selected detail
Title	Album details
Baracuda Raymond MacDonald & Neil Davidson	Iorram Records, 2021
Contentment Remember Fun	Firestation Records, 2021
Sass Raymond MacDonald & Gordon MacLean	FMR Records, 2020
Two Down to Eight Raymond MacDonald & Giles Lamb	Absentia Sound Works, 2020
Return To Y'Hup – The World of Ivor Cutler Citizen Bravo Raymond MacDonald & Friends	Chemikal Underground, 2020
Seas in Cities Raymond MacDonald and George Burt	Tob Records, 2019
HeartNoise Sensaround	hellosQuare Recordings, 2019
Energy Being Glasgow Improvisers Orchestra & Maggie Nicols	FMR Records, 2019
Sound Hotel Alister Spence & Raymond MacDonald	Alister Spence Music, 2018
Songs Along the Way Raymond MacDonald & Marilyn Crispell	Babel Label, 2018
Parallel Moments Unbroken Glasgow Improvisers Orchestra	FMR Records, 2018
Near & Far Raymond MacDonald & Jer Reid	Gruff Wit Records, 2018
The Word For It Now Glasgow Improvisers Orchestra	FMR Records, 2017
GIO Sevens Glasgow Improvisers Orchestra	Tob Records, 2017
Cast of Thousands Raymond MacDonald & Graeme Wilson	Creative Sources Recordings, 2016
Travelog Sensaround	hellosQuare Recordings, 2016
Isotropes Sensaround	hellosQuare Recordings, 2015
Parallel Moments Raymond MacDonald & Marilyn Crispell	Babel Label, 2014
Artificial Life Glasgow Improvisers Orchestra with George Lewis	FMR Records, 2014
Schweben – Ay, but can ye? (with Glasgow Improvisers Orchestra & Barry Guy)	Maya Recordings, November 2012
Stepping Between the Shadows Alister Spence & Raymond MacDonald	Rufus (RF95), April 2012
Improcherto (with Glasgow Improvisers Orchestra, Evan Parker & Lol Coxhil)	Iorram Records, January 2012
Linn Flax (with David Stackenas)	Iorram Records, January 2011
Buddy (The Raymond MacDonald International Big Band with Jim O'Rourke & Toby Hall)	Textile Records, November 2010
Cities (with Satoko Fujii, Natsuki Tamura, Neil Davidson & Tom Bancroft)	January 2008
Street Level (with Peter Nicholson)	Iorram Records, 2009
Metamorphic Rock with Glasgow Improvisers Orchestra & George Lewis	Iorram Records, January 2009
Other Voices with Aoife Mannix	Nu-Jazz Europe, 2009
Constant Weave Raymond MacDonald & George Burt	Iorram Records, 2009
Carnival Raymond MacDonald & Neil Davidson	Iorram Records, 2008
Separately & Together Glasgow Improvisers Orchestra & London Improvisers Orchestra	Emanem, 2008
Falkirk Glasgow Improvisers Orchestra & Barry Guy	FMR Records, 2007
Delphinius & Lyra Günter 'Baby' Sommer & Raymond MacDonald	Clean Feed Records, 2007
Dark in Light Corners Rich in Knuckles	Creative Sources Recordings, 2007
Aporias Raymond MacDonald, Tatsuya Nakatani, Neil Davidson, Peter Nicholson & Nick Fells	Creative Sources Recordings, 2007
One Bloke George Burt Raymond MacDonald Quintet	Textile Records, 2007
Flapjack Raymond MacDonald & Neil Davidson	FMR Records, 2006
Boo Hoo Fever George Burt - Raymond MacDonald Sextet	Leo Records, 2007
Listen Big Rich in Knuckles	ISIS Music, 2005
The Great Shark Hunt George Burt - Raymond MacDonald Septet	FMR Records, 2005
Which Way Did He Go? Glasgow Improvisers Orchestra & Maggie Nicols	FMR Records, 2005<
Hotel Dilettante George Burt - Raymond MacDonald Quintet	Textile Records, 2005
A Day for a Reason George Burt - Raymond MacDonald Sextet with Keith Tippett	Tob Records, 2005
Asylum Giles Lamb & Raymond MacDonald	Deluge & Guitary, 2005
Munich & Glasgow Glasgow Improvisers Orchestra & Evan Parker	FMR Records, 2004
Pop Corn George Burt - Raymond MacDonald Octet	FMR Records, 2004
Coxhill Street George Burt - Raymond MacDonald Quartet with Lol Coxhill	FMR Records, 2002
Tsunami George Burt - Raymond MacDonald Quartet	FMR Records, 2001
Train Journeys Remember Fun	Matinee, 2001
Hey There You Hosers Hung Drawn Quartet	HDQ, 2001
Big Brothers George Burt - Raymond MacDonald Quartet	BMacD, 2000
Oh Hello George Burt - Raymond MacDonald Quartet	BMacD, 1998
A Train in the Distance Hung Drawn Quartet	HDQ,1995

Contributions to, or tracks on
Title	Album details
Get while the getting is good Compilation	Aufgeladen und Bereit, 2006
Secrets from the Clock House Future Pilot AKA	Creeping Bent, 2006
The Electronic Bible Chapter One Compilation	White Label, 2004
Lead us not into Temptation David Byrne	Thrill Jockey, 2003
Salute Your Soul Future Pilot AKA	Geographic, 2003
You don't need darkness Compilation	Geographic, 2002
Séance at Hobbs Lane Mount Vernon Arts Lab	Topcities, 2001
Tiny Waves Mighty Sea Future Pilot AKA	Geographic, 2001
Be-Bop to Hip-Hop Compilation	Demus, 1996
The Rise of the Phoenix Compilation	Optimum, 1989
Airspace Compilation	EGG Records 1989
A Lighthouse in the Desert Compilation	EGG Records 1989

== Academic career ==
Between 2000 and 2012, MacDonald worked in the Psychology Department at Glasgow Caledonian University, where he led the Glasgow Caledonian Music Psychology Research Group. Since 2012, he has held the position of Professor of Music Psychology and Improvisation at Edinburgh University and was Head of The School of Music between 2013 and 2016. He was editor of the journal Psychology of Music between 2006 and 2012. He runs workshops and lectures internationally on issues relating to composition, improvisation, music education, health and wellbeing and musical communication.

== Publications ==
=== Books ===
- MacDonald, R. and Wilson, G. (2020), The Art of Becoming: How Group Improvisation Works New York: Oxford University Press.

=== Edited books ===
- MacDonald R.A.R, Miell D & Hargreaves D.J. EDS (2017), The Oxford Handbook of Musical Identities Oxford: Oxford University Press.
- MacDonald R.A.R, &. Kreutz, G Mitchell, L.A., EDS (2012), Music, Health and Wellbeing Oxford: Oxford University Press.
- Hargreaves D.J. Miell D & MacDonald R.A.R, EDS (2012), Musical Imaginations Oxford: Oxford University Press.
- Miell, D. MacDonald R.A.R, & Hargreaves D.J. EDS (2005), Musical Communication Oxford: Oxford University Press.
- MacDonald R.A.R, Miell D & Hargreaves D.J. EDS (2002), Musical Identities Oxford: Oxford University Press.

=== Selected refereed journal articles & book chapters ===
- MacDonald, R.A.R, Burke, R.L. De Nora, T, Sappho Donohue, M. and Birrell, R. (2021) Our Virtual Tribe: Sustaining and Enhancing Community via Online Music Improvisation Frontiers in Psychology.
- MacDonald, R.A.R. and Birrell, R. (2021) Flattening the curve: Glasgow Improvisers Orchestra's use of virtual improvising to maintain community during COVID-19 pandemic. Critical Studies in Improvisation.
- MacGlone, U. M.; Vamvakaris, J.; Wilson, G. B. & MacDonald, R. A. R. (2020) 'Understanding the effects of a community music programme for people with disabilities: a mixed-methods, person-centred study'. Frontiers in Psychology.
