= Coco Electrik =

Australian electropop band

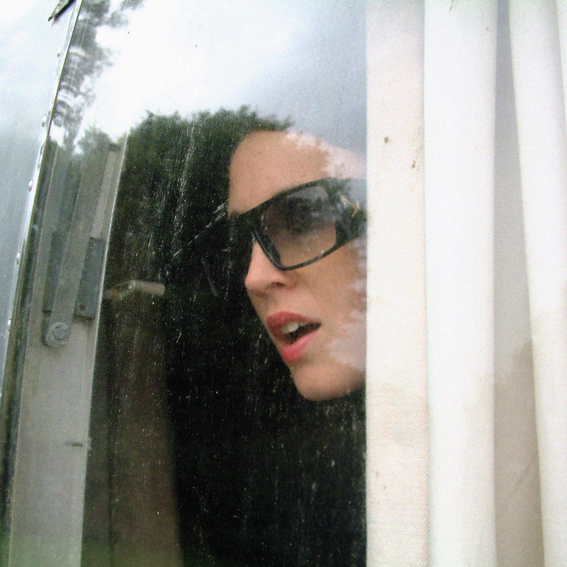
- Coco Electrik singer Anne Booty

Background information
- Origin: London
- Genres: Electronica; Pop
- Years active: 2004–present
- Labels: Tummy Touch; Oscillation Records
- Members: Anne Booty; Paul Harrison; Additional live members Daniel Whittaker; Adam de Gruchy; Martin Dean
- Past members: Mat Ducasse of Skylab; Milan Simic
- Website: www.cocoelectrik.co.uk

Coco Electrik is an electropop band and musical alias of Australian (now UK based) singer, musician and songwriter Anne Booty and producer Paul Harrison aka Royal Appointment.

== History ==
Coco Electrik first surfaced with Your Love Is Gum, a split single with then label mate Tom Vek. A series of acclaimed singles followed on Tummy Touch Records and Anne's own label, Oscillation Records. In 2007 they released debut album Army Behind The Sun. She has also lent vocals to Acoustic Ladyland's much praised Cuts & Lies single from their album Skinny Grin, been featured on the soundtrack to The Coen Brother's Burn After Reading and cult Australian drama Underbelly and remixed by Brooklyn wunderkind Kotchy and The Phenomenal Handclap Band as well as being remixed by, amongst others, Mickey Moonlight (Ed Banger Records) and Skylab. "Apple Pie" (Skylab Remix) by Coco Electrik currently soundtracks Target Australia's Effortless Denim campaign.

2010/11 has seen the release of their second album White Ink, which was given a 8/10 rating by Vice magazine. The albums was written and recorded by Coco Electrik catalyst Anne Booty and long-term recording partner Paul Harrison (Royal Appointment) and features appearances from George Demure (Output Recordings, Tirk Recordings) Kreeps (Output Recordings) and Pete Wareham (Acoustic Ladyland, Polar Bear). The album was mastered by Robert Harder. Their single "Your Love Is Gum" features in episode of Fox 8's Australian drama, Slide.

In 2013, "Pussyfooter" (Ju.Do Remix) by Coco Electrik soundtracks the Target USA Fall Style campaign that premiered during every ad break of the 2013 Emmy Awards.

== Discography ==
=== Albums ===
- Army Behind The Sun (OSC002CD), Oscillation Records (2007)
- White Ink (OSC005CD), Oscillation Records (2010)

=== Singles ===
- "Your Love Is Gum" (TUCH111), Tummy Touch Records (2004)
- "Paint It Red" featuring Whitey (musician) (TUCH122), Tummy Touch Records (2005)
- "Sex Shooter" (TUCH126), Tummy Touch Records (2006)
- "Apple Pie" (OSC001), Oscillation Records (2006)
- "Tainted Love EP" (TUCH2001), Tummy Touch Records (2007)
- "Sasparilla Kiss" (OSC003), Oscillation Records (2007)
- "Shine A Light" (OSC004), Oscillation Records (2009)
- "Fire & Ice" (OSC005), Oscillation Records (2010)
- "Black Widow" (OSC007), Oscillation Records (2011)

=== Remixes ===
- "She Made It Easy (Coco Electrik remix)" by Kotchy (CIV002), Civil Records (2008)
- "Dim The Lights (Coco Electrik remix)" by The Phenomenal Handclap Band (TUCH2023), Tummy Touch Records (2010)
- "Distrust feat. Faris Badwan (The Horrors) (Coco Electrik remix)" by Black Devil Disco Club (LODWN020IT), Lo Recordings (2011)

=== Appears On ===
- Touch Tones 2 (TUCH 107 CD), Tummy Touch Records (2004)
- Vice #7 (Volume 3 Number 6), Vice Magazine (2005)
- Musique Boutique, Pioneer (2005)
- Skinny Grin by Acoustic Ladyland (VVR1043682), V2 Records (2006)
- Touch Tones 3 (TUCH2004CD), Tummy Touch Records (2007)
- Under The Covers, Tummy Touch Records (2007)
- Gym Music From Burn After Reading, Tummy Touch Records (2008)
- Touch Tones 1, 2, 3 And 4 Boxset (TTBOX001), Tummy Touch Records (2008)
- She Made It Easy (Coco Electrik Remix) by Kotchy, Civil Records (2008)
- Spencer Product Presents: Product No.2, Buzzard Gulch Music (2010)
