= In Each and Every One =

Studio album by Polar Bear
- Released: 24 March 2014
- Recorded: Livingston Studios
- Genre: Jazz
- Length: 66:00
- Label: The Leaf Label
- Producer: Sebastian Rochford

Polar Bear chronology
Peepers (2010)	In Each and Every One (2014)	Same as You (2015)

In Each and Every One is the fifth album by Sebastian Rochford's British jazz band Polar Bear.

== Background ==
This was the first Polar Bear record that was produced and mixed entirely by Rochford, giving him more creative control of the overall sound of the album. “For me, this album is about heart, and I hope that when people listen to it, it makes them feel theirs", says Rochford about the album, "I want people to let go, I want it to be an experience.”

== Critical reception ==
Professional ratings
Aggregate scores
Source	Rating
Metacritic	78/100
Review scores
Source	Rating
All About Jazz	4.5/5 stars
AllMusic	4/5 stars
Drowned in Sound	7/10
The Guardian	5/5 stars
Time Out	4/5 stars

In Each And Every One was widely celebrated and made an impact with its vast sonic departure from the group's previous release Peepers. "This album sees the band looking deeper into textures, sound manipulation, and the use of editing and electronics to expand their sound, moving farther away from anything resembling run-of-the-mill jazz", wrote AllMusic. Drowned in Sound described it as "another reinvention of an already highly experimental trademark sound" and "a monumental 70-minute journey of puzzling jazz experimentation [that] is a whirlwind of an experience that elevates as much as it does bury you in fear". Paul Tingen of Sound on Sound noted that In Each and Every One "takes the listener on an exotic journey through ambient music, drum & bass, electronic experimentation, free jazz, calypso, industrial, psychedelic rock and more, all held in a modern‑sounding production that has much more depth, variety and presence than that of Peeper."

On the Metacritic website, which aggregates various media and press reviews and assigns a normalised rating out of 100, In Each And Every One received a score of 78.

Polar Bear also were shortlisted for the 2014 Mercury Music Prize for In Each And Every One, garnering them extra media coverage and a wider audience.

== Track listing ==
All music written by Rochford

No.	Title	Length
1.	"Open See"	7:05
2.	"Be Free"	4:36
3.	"Chotpot"	5:35
4.	"They're All K's And Q's Lucien"	7:18
5.	"WW"	4:23
6.	"Lost In Death Part 2"	4:58
7.	"MALIANA"	8:40
8.	"Lost In Death Part 1"	6:52
9.	"Life And Life"	6:42
10.	"Two Storms"	3:37
11.	"Sometimes"	8:13

== Personnel ==
- Pete Wareham — tenor saxophone
- Mark Lockheart — tenor saxophone
- Sebastian Rochford - drums
- Tom Herbert - double bass
- Leafcutter John - electronics
- Sonny Johns - Recording Engineer

=== Additional musicians ===
- Jin Jin - vocals
