= Seb Rochford =

British musician

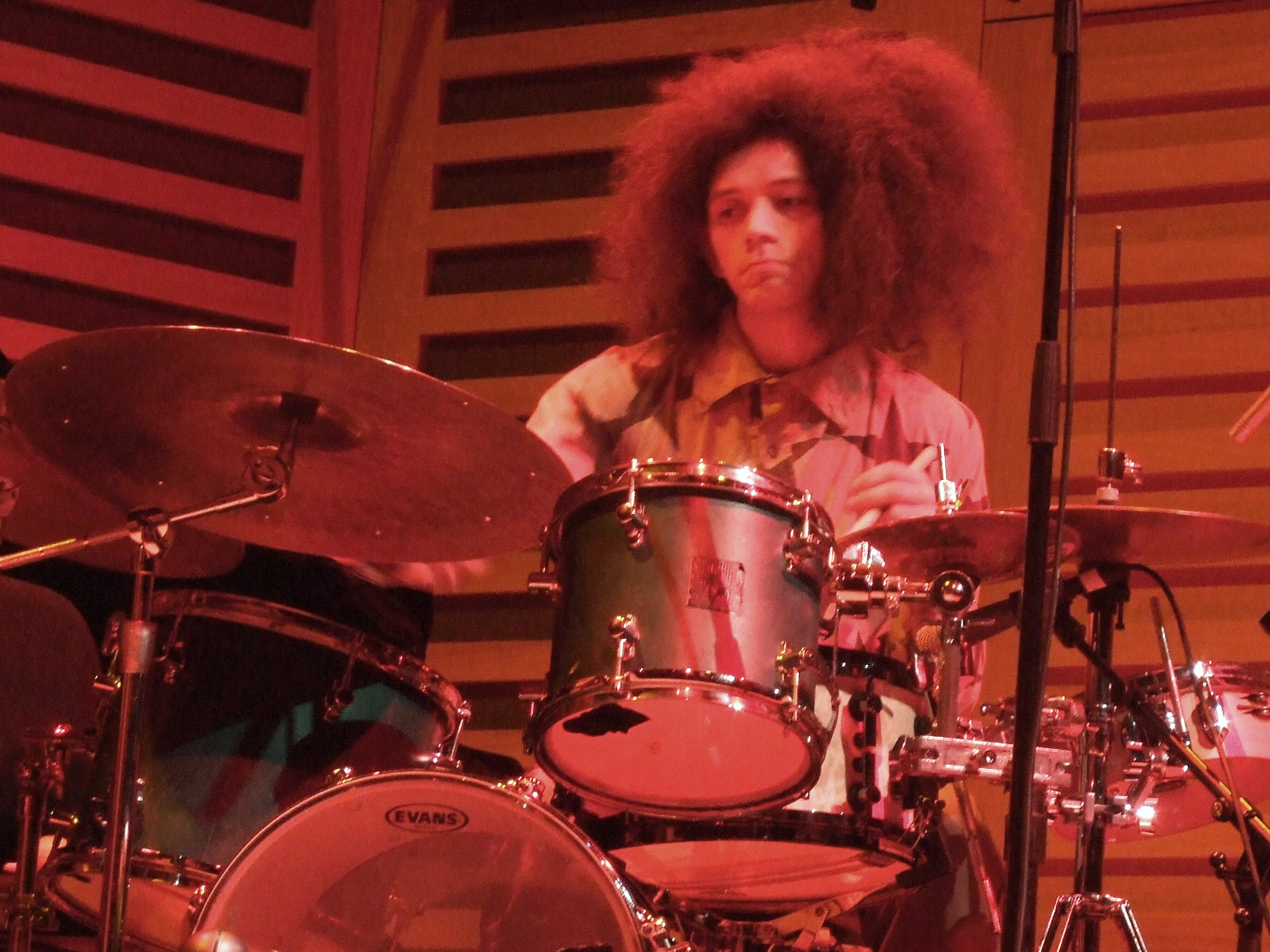

Background information
- Also known as: Room of Katinas
- Born: Aberdeen, Scotland
- Genres: Jazz, experimental, folk
- Occupation(s): Musician, songwriter
- Instrument: Drums

Sebastian Rochford is a Scottish drummer and composer. He has recorded and released music as leader of the British band Polar Bear, as Kutcha Butcha and as part of numerous collaborations.

== Early life ==
Rochford was born in Aberdeen, Scotland, and has two brothers and seven sisters. He is of English and Anglo-Indian descent. His father, Gerard Rochford, was a poet. Rochford's first performances were with a punk band called Cabbage in Aberdeen. He then studied at the Newcastle College of Music before moving to London.

== Later life and career ==
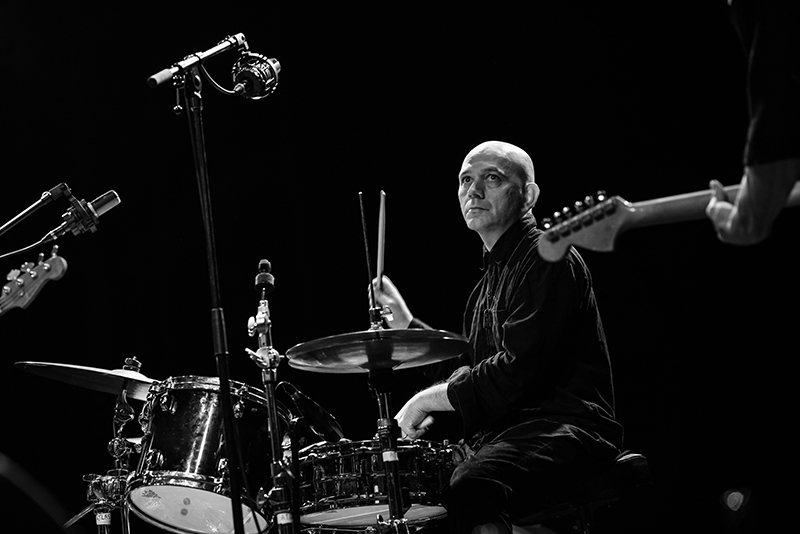
Rochford at Winterjazz in Aarhus, Denmark 2018

Rochford was band leader and composer of Polar Bear. The group released its first album Dim Lit in 2004 and its final album Same As You in 2015. The Polar Bear albums Held on the Tips of Fingers and In Each and Every One were nominated for the Mercury Prize in 2005 and 2014 respectively.

Rochford also played drums for Acoustic Ladyland, Basquiat Strings, Oriole, Menlo Park, Ingrid Laubrock Quintet, Bojan Zulfikarpasic's Tetraband, and was a founding member of Sons of Kemet. He has worked extensively with Joanna MacGregor and Andy Sheppard, led the band Fulborn Teversham and has an improvising duo with Leafcutter John. He also performs as a solo project under the name Room of Katinas.

His new band Pulled By Magnets made its debut in London in late 2018. The band sees Rochford reunited with frequent collaborator saxophonist Pete Wareham as well as bassist Neil Charles. Pulled By Magnets released their debut album Rose Golden Doorways in 2020.

January 2023 saw the release of a duo album with pianist Kit Downes. Entitled A Short Diary, the record was released on ECM and is dedicated to Rochford's father. In an interview with ECM, Sebastian described the album as a "short diary (of loss)" and "a sonic memory, created with love, out of need for comfort."

=== Collaborations ===
In 2006, Rochford collaborated with Gwyneth Herbert in a production role for her album Between Me and the Wardrobe. He played drums on Adele's Mercury-nominated album 19. He has drummed for Pete Doherty's band Babyshambles, performing on their eponymous debut single, and has continued to make guest appearances with them. He also played on the debut solo album by Carl Barât, Doherty's bandmate from Libertines.

In 2008, he drummed on the David Byrne and Brian Eno album Everything That Happens Will Happen Today, and rejoined Eno and Rick Holland for their album Drums Between the Bells. He produced and co-wrote a four-track EP with UK hip hop MC Mikill Pane, The Guinness & Blackcurrant EP, which was released independently in 2011. He played with Brett Anderson on Later Live... With Jools Holland on 1 November 2011. In 2014, Rochford played on Paolo Nutini's album Caustic Love and since 2015 he has toured with Patti Smith (alongside Tony Shanahan and Smith's son Jackson). He has also worked with Corrine Bailey Rae, Herbie Hancock and American theremin player Pamelia Kurstin.

In 2019 he co-composed the music the Chris Morris film The Day Shall Come and in 2020 he played with Charles Hazlewood's Paraorchestra with Brett Anderson and Nadine Shah for a BBC TV broadcast. In 2021 Rochford undertook a four month residency at London venue Servant Jazz Quarters, playing solo sets and as well as collaborations with Lara Jones, Jason Singh, Theon Cross, Shirley Tetteh and Neil Charles.

In 2021/22, Rochford toured with Damon Albarn in support of his solo album The Nearer the Fountain, More Pure the Stream Flows.

=== Days and Nights at the Takeaway ===
In 2012, Rochford engaged in a 12-month digital 'singles club' under the name Days and Nights at the Takeaway, a reference to his studio in North London. Each single consisted of a collaboration in a variety of styles and was backed by a remix by a third party. Collaborators included Jehst, Spoek Mathambo, Jason Moran, Soumik Datta, Leo Abrahams, Drew McConnell, Brian Eno and Oliver Coates. Remixers included Micachu, Pete Wareham, Tom Skinner, Simon Bookish and Chris Sharkey. The series was released by The Leaf Label.

== Awards and honours ==
Rochford won the BBC Jazz Award for best newcomer in 2004, and was nominated for best musician in 2006. He was also nominated for the Mercury Prize in 2005, 2007, 2014 and 2018, the nominations including Polar Bear's Held on The Tips of Fingers and In Each and Every One plus the self-titled debut album by Basquiat Strings.

== Discography ==
=== As leader/co-leader ===
With Polar Bear

- Dim Lit (Babel, 2004)
- Held on the Tips of Fingers (Babel, 2005)
- Polar Bear (Tin Angel, 2008)
- Peepers (The Leaf Label, 2010)
- In Each and Every One (The Leaf Label, 2014)
- Same as You (The Leaf Label, 2015)

As Kutcha Butcha

- Ndya (Half Baked Bread, 2019)
- At Odds (Bandcamp release, 2019)
- Separation (Bandcamp release, 2020)
- Prerevolution (Bandcamp release, 2021)
- Durational (Bandcamp release, 2021)

Other

- Fulborn Teversham - Count Herbert III (Pickled Egg, 2007)
- Sebastian Rochford and Pamelia Kurstin - Ouch Evil Slow Hop (Slowfoot 2011)
- Sebastian Rochford and David Coulter - Good Friday (Trestle records, 2016)
- Pulled by Magnets - Rose Golden Doorways (Tak:Til, 2020)
- Sebastian Rochford and Kit Downes - A Short Diary (ECM, 2023)

=== On drums ===
With Acoustic Ladyland

- Camouflage (Babel, 2004)
- Last Chance Disco (Babel, 2005)
- Skinny Grin (V2, 2006)
- Living with a Tiger (Strong and Wrong, 2009)

With Brigitte Fontaine

- Prohibition (Polydor Records, 2009)
- L'un n'empêche pas l'autre (Polydor Records, 2011)

With Mark Lockheart

- Ellington in Anticipation (Edition, 2013)
- Days on Earth (Edition, 2019)

With Andy Sheppard

- Trio Libero (ECM, 2012)
- Surrounded by Sea (ECM, 2015)
- Romaria (ECM, 2018)

With Oriole

- Song for the Sleeping (F-IRE, 2004)
- Migration (F-IRE, 2006)
- Every New Day (F-IRE, 2012)

With Sons of Kemet

- Burn (Naim, 2013)
- Lest We Forget What We Came Here to Do (Naim, 2015)
- Your Queen Is a Reptile (Impulse!, 2018)

With Theo Girard

- 30YearsFrom (Discobole Records/Modulor, 2017)
- Interlude (Discobole Records, 2019)
- Bulle (Discobole Records, 2019)
- Pensées Rotatives (Discobole Records, 2019)

=== Miscellaneous ===
- Babyshambles - Babyhambles (High Society, 2004)
- Littl'ans featuring Peter Doherty - Their Way (Rough Trade, 2004)
- Julia Biel - Not Alone (Rokit Records, 2005)
- Basquiat Strings - Basquiat Strings With Seb Rochford (F-IRE, 2007)
- Brian Eno and David Byrne - Everything That Happens Will Happen Today (Tudo Mundo, 2008)
- Adele - 19 (XL Recordings, 2008)
- Bojan Zulfikarpašić - Humus (EmArcy/Universal, 2009)
- Cheikh Lô - Jamm (World Circuit, 2010)
- Corinne Bailey Rae - (The Sea Virgin, 2010)
- Brett Anderson - Black Rainbows (EMI, 2011)
- Fatoumata Diawara - Fatou - (World Circuit, 2011)
- Brian Eno with Rick Holland - Drums Between The Bells (Warp 2011)
- Rokia Traore - Beautiful Africa (Nonesuch, 2013)
- Grace Jones - Original Beast (2014)
- Paolo Nutini - Caustic Love (Atlantic, 2014)
- Carl Barat - Carl Barat (Arcady, 2014)
- Jess Glynne - Home (single) (Atlantic, 2014)
- James Morrison - Higher Than Here (Island, 2015)
- Helsinki – A Guide For The Perplexed (Fierce Panda, 2015)
- Patti Smith - Live in Berlin (2015)
- Nicolai Munch-Hansen, Peter Laugesen - Det Flimrende Lys Over Brabrand Sø (Stunt,2016)
- Irah - Diamond Grid (Tambourhinoceros, 2019)
- Abrasive Trees - Replenishing Water (SHAPTA, 2021)
- Aldous Harding - Warm Chris (4AD, 2022)
