= Peepers (album) =

Studio album by Polar Bear
- Released: 1 March 2010
- Studio: Pinha Studios
- Genre: Jazz
- Length: 46:00
- Label: The Leaf Label
- Producer: Sebastian Rochford

Polar Bear chronology
Polar Bear (2008)	Peepers (2010)	In Each and Every One (2014)

Peepers is the fourth album by Sebastian Rochford's British jazz band Polar Bear.

== Background ==
Released in 2008, Peepers is Polar Bear's first release for Yorkshire-based label The Leaf Label. The album differs from earlier records in its lack of additional musicians and in the fact that it was recorded live, in one room without separators or headphones. The music was recorded in just two days and previous to that the band had minimal rehearsals, performing the music only at two shows at the Vortex Jazz Club in North London. In 2015, a public poll selected Peepers as one of ten albums to be reissued as part of The Leaf Label's 20th anniversary celebrations. Having been out of print for some time, a limited edition run of 700 copies was made available to fans via the PledgeMusic service before being introduced in shops in early 2016.

== Critical reception ==
Professional ratings
Aggregate scores
Source	Rating
Metacritic	78/100
Review scores
Source	Rating
All About Jazz	4.5/5 stars
AllMusic	4/5 stars
Drowned in Sound	9/10
The Guardian	4/5 stars
The Independent	Positive

Peepers received positive reviews and was noted for its decidedly different sound compared to Polar Bear's earlier records. On the Metacritic website, which aggregates reviews from critics and assigns a normalized rating out of 100, Peepers received a score of 78, based on 1 mixed and 8 positive reviews. The Independent write that Peepers is "a little more formalistic than before" but conclude that "the resoluteness of the Bear in their Britishness .... is one of the rowdier pleasures of the age". The Guardian awarded the album 4 stars, complimenting the "freshness" given to the music by Rochford's choice of recording and rehearsal techniques. All About Jazz write that "Peepers is the finest Polar Bear album yet, which makes it a very fine recording indeed". Drowned in Sound write that "even at their most gesticulating or achingly smooth, their music is vivid – there’s rarely a moment that goes by that doesn't goad you into thought".

== Track listing ==
All tracks are written by Rochford except "Scream" and "Bump" written by Rochford, Wareham, Lockheart, Herbert and Burton.

No.	Title	Length
1.	"Happy for You"	4:09
2.	"Bap Bap Bap"	2:12
3.	"Drunken Pharaoh"	3:26
4.	"The Love Didn't Go Anywhere"	7:00
5.	"A New Morning Will Come"	4:42
6.	"Peepers"	4:24
7.	"Bump"	0:38
8.	"Scream"	0:36
9.	"Hope Every Day is a Happy New Year"	4:07
10.	"I Want to Believe Everything"	4:36
11.	"Finding Our Feet"	6:38
12.	"All Here"	5:50

== Personnel ==
- Pete Wareham – tenor saxophone
- Mark Lockheart – tenor saxophone
- Sebastian Rochford – drums
- Tom Herbert – double bass
- Leafcutter John – electronics, electric guitar
