= Dim Lit =

Studio album by Polar Bear
- Released: 1 September 2004
- Genre: Jazz
- Length: 64:00
- Label: Babel Label and The Leaf Label
- Producer: Robert Harder, Sebastian Rochford

Polar Bear chronology
Dim Lit (2004)	Held on the Tips of Fingers (2005)

Dim Lit is the debut album by British jazz band Polar Bear, formed and led by drummer Sebastian Rochford.

== Background ==
Polar Bear were awarded Best Band at the BBC Jazz Awards 2004, giving Dim Lit a platform for small scale success. It was eventually surpassed by their following album Held on the Tips Of Fingers (2005), which was nominated for a Mercury Music Prize.

The album was initially released on Babel Label and re-issued by The Leaf Label in 2014.

== Reception ==
Professional ratings
Review scores
Source	Rating
The Guardian	4/5 stars
The Penguin Guide to Jazz Recordings	3/4 stars

The Guardian write that this album "captures (Polar Bear's) unique virtues" and that it "goes straight on to the albums-of-2004 longlist". The BBC call Dim Lit "a finely crafted album" in their review of the follow-up album.

== Track listing ==
All tracks written by Seb Rochford

No.	Title	Length
1.	"Heavy Paws on the Purple Floor"	6:27
2.	"Not Here, Not Near"	6:51
3.	"Eve's Apple"	8:02
4.	"Polar Bear Standing and Ready"	4:34
5.	"Urban Kilt"	6:21
6.	"Snow"	4:30
7.	"Underneath You Can See Too Much"	7:00
8.	"The Shapes in the Clouds Aren't Always Happy"	7:28
9.	"New Dark Park"	9:32
10.	"Wild Horses"	5:13

== Personnel ==
=== Polar Bear ===
- Pete Wareham — tenor saxophone
- Mark Lockheart — tenor saxophone
- Sebastian Rochford – drums, percussion, drum programming
- Tom Herbert – double bass

=== Additional musicians ===
- Julia Biel – vocals (6)
- Ben Davis – cello (3, 10)
- John Greswell – viola (3, 6, 10)
- Adam Bishop – bass clarinet (6)
- Robert Harder – piano (7)
