= Last Chance Disco =

Studio album by Acoustic Ladyland
- Released: 16 May 2005
- Recorded: December 2004 – January 2005; Eastcote Studios (London)
- Genre: Punk jazz
- Length: 42:57
- Label: Babel Label
- Producer: Philip Bagenal & Acoustic Ladyland

Acoustic Ladyland chronology
Camouflage (2004)	Last Chance Disco (2005)	Skinny Grin (2006)

Last Chance Disco is the second studio album by British punk jazz band Acoustic Ladyland. It was released on 16 May 2005 by Babel Label.

== Background ==
Last Chance Disco was created as a reaction to Pete Wareham's frustration with jazz, and his desire to fuse jazz with the "ethic and fun of punk". The album has been called a mixture of "the language of jazz with the rhetoric of instrumental rock" by The Guardian. The album has also been described as being "closer to thrash metal and grindcore than jazz" in an article describing the band as "an electric jazz band that plays dirty rock 'n' roll, or a dirty rock 'n' roll band that plays electric jazz".

The band promoted the album on the UK television show Later... with Jools Holland shortly after the album's release. Last Chance Disco gained critical acclaim from reviewers on release, Jazzwise ultimately naming it the best album of 2005 in their end of year poll. The Observer also ranked the album in their end of year list, calling it the 85th best album of the 2005 (in any genre). As well as receiving praise for the album, the band themselves won 'Best Band' at the BBC Jazz Awards in the same year.

== Critical reception ==
Professional ratings
Review scores
Source	Rating
All About Jazz	5/5 stars
BBC	Positive
The Guardian	4/5 stars
The Jazz Mann	5/5 stars
Stylus Magazine	A−
The Penguin Guide to Jazz Recordings	2.5/4 stars

John L Walters in The Guardian calls the album "an all-out assault on the senses", stating that "this is the least "smooth" jazz album in years". All About Jazz write that Last Chance Disco is "a near seamless flow of rapid fire explosions, postmodern beats, raucous instrumental exuberance, passion, anger and, indefinably but unmistakably, hope and optimism" and say that this album is a "punk jazz orgasm you don't want to miss". The BBC review states that this album is "the first classic of the post-jazz movement" and describes an album of "life-affirmingly dumb shrieks, stomps and power chords". Ian Mann writes that Last Chance Disco is "one of the albums of 2005 in any genre, and highly recommended to adventurous rock fans as well as hardcore jazz followers" in his review. Stylus Magazine wrote in their review that "the whole damn album is just great ... a relentless ska-punk-jazz-metal conglomeration that shouldn’t work but does".

== Track listing ==
All songs written by Pete Wareham except where stated. All songs arranged by Acoustic Ladyland

1. "Iggy" – 1:56
2. "Om Konz" – 5:49
3. "Deckchair" – 4:05
4. "Remember" (P Wareham, M Wareham) – 5:44
5. "Perfect Bitch" (P Wareham, M Wareham) – 1:58
6. "Ludwig Van Ramone" – 4:37
7. "High Heel Blues" (P Wareham, M Wareham) – 2:02
8. "Trial And Error" – 4:47
9. "Thing" – 2:38
10. "Of You" (P Wareham, Seb Rochford) – 4:39
11. "Nico" – 4:42

== Personnel ==
- Pete Wareham – saxophones
- Tom Cawley – keyboards
- Tom Herbert – bass
- Sebastian Rochford – drums
