= Menlo Park (band) =

American alternative-rock band

- Genres: Alternative rock
- Years active: Formed 1999; disbanded 21st-century
- Members: Defunct
- Past members: Chris Taylor (vocals); John Gresswell; Ben Nicholls (bass); Natasha Panas (piano, vocals); Seb Rochford (drums)
- Website: menloparkmusic.com

Menlo Park was an alternative-rock band, founded in 1999, and recording between 2000 and 2003.

The band has been described by the London Evening Standard as "cajun folkists", by Time Out as "theatrical swamp", and by themselves as "hip-hop county" and "voodoo folk".

It featured Seb Rochford, who won the BBC Rising Star Jazz Award in 2004 and leads the Mercury Prize-nominated experimental-jazz group Polar Bear.

== Band members ==
- Chris Taylor
- John Greswell
- Ben Nicholls (bass)
- Natasha Panas (piano, vocals)
- Seb Rochford (drums)

== Albums and EPs ==
Title	Date of Release
Menlo Park	2000
We All Doctors Here (EP)	2000
Greetings From Montauk NY (EP)	2002
Greetings From Lambeth (EP)	2003

== See also ==
- List of alternative rock artists
