= Polar Bear (album) =

Studio album by Polar Bear
- Released: 1 September 2008
- Studio: Miloco Pool Studio
- Genre: Jazz
- Length: 72:00
- Label: Tin Angel and The Leaf Label
- Producer: Sebastian Rochford and Mark Rankin

Polar Bear chronology
Held on the Tips of Fingers (2005)	Polar Bear (2008)	Peepers (2010)

Polar Bear is the third album by Sebastian Rochford's British jazz band, Polar Bear.

== Background ==
According to the band, they spent "a lot of time" recording Polar Bear; Seb Rochford stating that he wanted the album "to have the saxes not so much soloing, but more interacting with (Leafcutter) John, and it took a while for everyone to get their heads round improvising in that way".

The album was initially released on Tin Angel in 2008, but was re-issued by The Leaf Label in 2014.

== Critical reception ==
Professional ratings
Aggregate scores
Source	Rating
Metacritic	72/100
Review scores
Source	Rating
BBC	Positive
Drowned in Sound	8/10
The Guardian	4/5 stars
The Observer	2/5 stars

On the Metacritic website, which aggregates reviews from critics and assigns a normalised rating out of 100, Peepers received a score of 72, based on 1 mixed and 3 positive reviews. Drowned in Sound praised the album's "seamless motion and playful interplay" and "sheer musical pleasure", awarding it 8/10. The BBC called it a "triumph" in their review, calling Polar Bear "a fine record". The Guardian write that Rochford is a "proper jazz composer, whose themes are spare, colourful and strong enough to frame and support extensive improvisation from his talented crew and guests" and call the album "brilliant". The Observer are less impressed, writing that "this is a band running out of ideas", calling Polar Bear "good in small doses". Ultimately, the album did not receive the same press as the previous album, Held on the Tips Of Fingers, which had gained extra media attention after being shortlisted for a Mercury Music Prize.

== Track listing ==
All music is composed by Rochford, except 4 & 13 by Rochford, Lockheart, Wareham, Burton & Herbert and 11 by Rochford, Burton, Herbert & Laubrook

No.	Title	Length
1.	"Tay"	4:48
2.	"Goodbye"	7:59
3.	"Appears, Moves and Sails"	6:31
4.	"Tomlovesalicelovestom"	6:02
5.	"Voices"	5:53
6.	"Industry"	3:39
7.	"Brian"	7:06
8.	"Sunshine"	4:42
9.	"Leafcup"	8:11
10.	"It Snows Again"	5:00
11.	"Sounds Like a Train to Me"	2:39
12.	"I Am Alive"	4:55
13.	"Woollen Blanket"	2:14
14.	"Joy Jones"	5:28

== Personnel ==
=== Polar Bear ===
- Pete Wareham – tenor saxophone
- Mark Lockheart – tenor saxophone
- Sebastian Rochford – drums, bass (13)
- Tom Herbert – double bass, drums (13)
- Leafcutter John – electronics, mandolin, kalimba, glass, bowed cymbal, samples and balloon

=== Additional musicians ===
- Julia Biel – vocals (7 and 8)
- Ben Davis – cello (8)
- Amanda Drummond – viola (12)
- Brian Edwards – tenor saxophone (7)
- Ingrid Laubrock – tenor saxophone (11)
