= Same as You =

Studio album by Polar Bear
- Released: 30 March 2015
- Recorded: Assault & Battery Studio (London)
- Genres: Jazz, electronica
- Length: 54:02
- Label: The Leaf Label
- Producer: Sebastian Rochford

Polar Bear chronology
In Each and Every One (2014)	Same as You (2015)

Same as You is the sixth studio album by British jazz band Polar Bear. It was released on 30 March 2015 by The Leaf Label.

== Background ==
The band rehearsed and recorded the album in the UK, after which Seb Rochford went to California and mixed the album with Ken Barrientos in the Mojave Desert. Rochford instructed members Pete Wareham and Mark Lockheart not to rehearse their solos prior to recording, using their spontaneous first takes as the definitive versions.

Rochford stated in an interview that the album "was very much influenced by the desire to share positivity and love, but also by my experience in the Mojave Desert, where I found amazing inspiration and perspective". Jazzwise magazine wrote that the vocals on the album "can be traced back to A Love Supreme", and listed the Gondwana Orchestra and Primal Scream’s Screamadelica as other reference points. Rochford further stated that the album is "definitely influenced by more Indian music than any of our other albums". "Life, Love And Light" was co-written and narrated by Asar Mikael, All About Jazz stating that his ""heartfelt and life-affirming spoken word performance is the tune's central focus". Jamie Cullum recommended the album in an interview with NPR, stating: "I think Polar Bear are the great argument for why European jazz is something that is vital".

Same as You charted at number 5 on the UK's Official Jazz & Blues Albums Chart and stayed in the chart for a four-week run. The band have also been nominated for two Jazz FM awards, including "UK Jazz Act of the Year".

== Critical reception ==
Professional ratings
Aggregate scores
Source	Rating
Metacritic	79/100
Review scores
Source	Rating
All About Jazz	4/5 stars
AllMusic	4/5 stars
Clash	5/10
Drowned in Sound	7/10
The Guardian	5/5 stars
Jazzwise	4/5 stars
The Line of Best Fit	7.5/10
Mojo	4/5 stars
MusicOMH	4/5 stars
The Observer	4/5 stars

On the Metacritic website, which aggregates reviews from critics and assigns a normalised rating out of 100, Same as You received a score of 79, based on 2 mixed and 9 positive reviews. Mojo write that Same as You "is a joyous affirmation of positivity", stating that "the focal point throughout is Seb Rochford's drums, his rhythmic patterns simultaneously primal and abstract". The Observer write that Same as You has "a spacier, more minimalist sound, no doubt influenced by the Mojave Desert" and praise the "playful pulse of gentle polyrhythms alongside Tom Herbert’s taut, dub-like acoustic bass". Touching on similar themes, the reviewer in Jazzwise writes that this is "the most emotionally engaging music ... from them. Though recorded in London, Seb Rochford’s relocation to the Mojave Desert to mix surely added to its haunting ambience". Clash felt differently, stating that "the music can sometimes be difficult to really grip onto" and describing an album where "the overall feeling is one of ennui". All About Jazz write that the album has "a feeling of relaxed positivity and well-being" and state that the album shows the band "as an ensemble (and) Same as You as a coherent work". The online review site musicOMH state that "this music emphasises an unhurried, thoughtful approach to life that is beautifully at odds with the noise of a bustling metropolis in a General Election year". "The clear highlight comes with "Don't Let The Feeling Go", a protracted chant-along and the album's centrepiece" states the review at Drowned in Sound, calling the song "spiky, catchy, bright, positive and fun, which, really, is Same as You all over." The Line of Best Fit write that "Same as You isn't going to be the most exciting release from Polar Bear you'll hear, but it is a solid and entirely welcome release from a band who rarely put a foot wrong". AllMusic call this Polar Bear's "most musically satisfying album", writing that "there is a compelling meld of styles here, but the thread that ties its various elements together is the rhythm section's exploration of dub". The Guardian write that Same as You is "every bit as sonically spellbinding and cohesive as In Each and Every One describing the album as "another uncategorisable and understated triumph" in their five star review.

== Track listing ==
All tracks written by Sebastian Rochford, except "Life Love and Light" written by Rochford and Asar Mikael

1. "Life Love and Light" – 03:09
2. "We Feel the Echoes" – 10:24
3. "The First Steps" – 5:24
4. "Of Hi Lands" – 7:40
5. "Don't Let the Feeling Go" – 7:30
6. "Unrelenting Unconditional" – 19:52

== Personnel ==
Polar Bear

- Mark Lockheart – tenor saxophone
- Pete Wareham – tenor saxophone
- Tom Herbert – double bass
- Leafcutter John – electronics
- Sebastian Rochford – drums, vocals

Additional musicians

- Asar Mikael – spoken word (1)
- Shabaka Hutchings – tenor saxophone (5)
- Hannah Darling – vocals (5)
- Gar Robertson – vocals (5)
- Poppy Mullings – vocal sounds (3)
