= Songs Along the Way =

Studio album by Raymond MacDonald and Marilyn Crispell
- Released: 2018
- Genre: Jazz
- Label: Babel; BDV17149

Songs Along the Way is an album by saxophonist Raymond MacDonald and pianist Marilyn Crispell. It was released in 2018 by Babel Records.

== Reception ==
Professional ratings
Review scores
Source	Rating
Jazz Journal	3.5/5 stars

In a review for Jazz Journal, Barry Witherden wrote: "There is a beguilingly pastoral quality to some of the music... but there is no shortage of tumultuous, impassioned playing either. Both modes are impressive, poignant or rousing as appropriate."

Shaun Brady, writing for Jazz Times, called the album "a stunning duo date... that ranges from tender beauty and traditional song forms to explosive bursts of torrential abstraction."

Jazz Word's Ken Waxman stated that the musicians "express the romantic musical elements usually hidden in their more avant-garde work," and praised the track titled "Vortex," commenting: "A sonic whirlpool, but one in which neither player is lost, the... tune tracks the tonal evolution of MacDonald from echoing Johnny Hodges-like expressiveness to narrative deconstruction with growls and reed bites, and climaxes with tongue-stopping pressure. Crispell's entrance with bouncy key clips and pedal pushed low notes induces the saxophonist to change to lower-pitched notes and intensity vibrations. Together her keyboard galloping and his extravagant sound variable restructure the piece but without losing its forward motion."

The creators of the Marlbank web site included the album in their "2018 Albums of the Year" list, stating: "Playing bond deepens in remarkable duoplay."

== Track listing ==
1. "All the Songs Above Your Head" (MacDonald) – 4:39
2. "Roundabout" (MacDonald, Crispell) – 3:54
3. "Why I Missed Cole Porter" (MacDonald) – 3:39
4. "Beach at Newquay" (Crispell) – 4:34
5. "Foresee" (MacDonald) – 2:21
6. "Vortex" (MacDonald, Crispell) – 13:53
7. "We Are Going" (traditional) – 4:55
8. "Neolithic" (MacDonald, Crispell) – 7:58
9. "Stars" (MacDonald, Crispell) – 8:01
10. "Across the Reservoir" (MacDonald, Crispell) – 3:38
11. "The Gallery" (MacDonald) – 5:55

== Personnel ==
- Raymond MacDonald – alto saxophone, soprano saxophone
- Marilyn Crispell – piano
