= In Deep (Mark Lockheart album) =

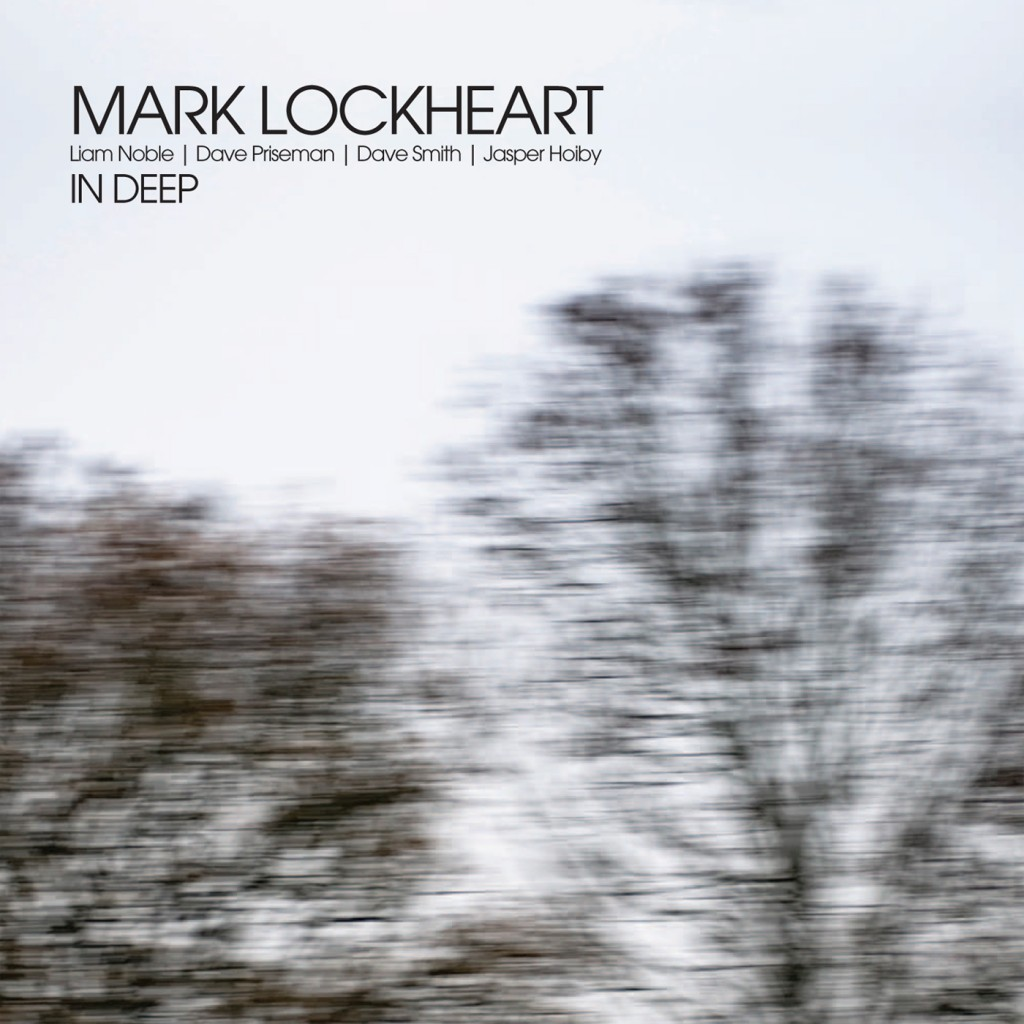

Studio album by Mark Lockheart
- Released: 2009
- Recorded: June 2008
- Studio: Phoenix Sound, Pinewood Studios, Iver Heath
- Genre: Jazz
- Length: 60:38
- Label: Edition
- Producer: Mark Lockheart

Mark Lockheart chronology
Moving Air (2005)	In Deep (2009)	Days Like These (2010)

In Deep is an album by jazz musician Mark Lockheart, released in 2009 on Edition Records.

== Reception ==
In Deep received universally good reviews. In The Guardian, John Fordham said "Lockheart picked the right title: that's exactly where it takes you" and awarded it 4 stars. In All About Jazz, John Kelman wrote "The line-up may suggest mainstream, but this is no straight-ahead session...As impressive as Lockheart was on Moving Air, his playing has become even more muscular, combining the late Michael Brecker's visceral power with his own kind of tension-and-release." The Yorkshire Post wrote "Lockheart's work nods to Coltrane and Michael Brecker, but he's firmly his own man." Ray Comiskey in the Irish Times drew attention to Lockheart's skills in utilising the talents of his band "Lockheart’s voicings (using some brass overdubbing) have a fine appreciation of the tonal qualities the players bring to the table". Ian Mann said the album was a "strong candidate for Lockheart's best work to date". Lockheart was interviewed in Jazzwise in June 2009, where he explained that the title of the album described how improvising is about connecting with another musician at a very deep level.

== Track listing ==
All compositions by Mark Lockheart, except track 8 by Lockheart and Liam Noble, and track 10 by Lockheart, Noble, Jasper Høiby, and Dave Smith.

1. "Stairway" – 1:50
2. "Surfacing" – 10:05
3. "Golden People" – 6:42
4. "Long Way Gone" – 5:53
5. "Undercovers" – 3:06
6. "Believe It or Not" – 7:49
7. "Not In My Name" – 7:33
8. "Falling" – 2:44
9. "Sand Into Gold" – 5:58
10. "Snakeout" – 1:14
11. "Nutter" – 2:10
12. "Sunday Soon" – 5:34

- Total length – 60:38

== Personnel ==
- Mark Lockheart – saxophone
- Dave Priseman – trumpet
- Liam Noble – piano
- Jasper Høiby – bass
- Dave Smith – drums
- Produced by Mark Lockheart
- Recorded June 2008 at Phoenix Sound, Pinewood Studios, Iver Heath
- Mixed January 2009 by Steve Baker at Galapagos Studios, London
- Mastered February 2009 by Mark Tucker
- Photography by Dave Stapleton and Tim Dickeson
