= Surrounded by Sea =

Studio album by Andy Sheppard Quartet
- Released: April 17, 2015
- Recorded: August 2014
- Studio: Auditorio Stelio Molo RSI, Lugano, Switzerland
- Genre: Jazz
- Length: 53:23
- Label: ECM; ECM 2432
- Producer: Manfred Eicher

Andy Sheppard chronology
Trio Libero (2012)	Surrounded by Sea (2015)	Romaria (2018)

Surrounded by Sea is an album by British saxophonist and composer Andy Sheppard recorded in Switzerland in 2014 and released on the ECM label the following year.

== Reception ==
Professional ratings
Review scores
Source	Rating
Allmusic	3.5/5 stars
All About Jazz	4/5 stars
The Guardian	4/5 stars

The AllMusic review by Thom Jurek notes "Surrounded by Sea invites the listener into an intimate, mysterious sound world. Sheppard's band plays with discipline and restraint. Through extremely close listening, the players explore the mystery of melody -- both plainly stated and implied -- and its various thematic trails in inspired if laid-back dialogue".

All About Jazz reviewer Ian Patterson said, "Surrounded by Sea is an intimate statement whose chemistry belies the quartet's brief existence. There's a bold honesty in the music's refined contours and graceful adventure that invites and rewards the patient listener. There's the feeling too, that this quartet has plenty more to offer".

In The Guardian, John Fordham called it "an intriguing shift for Sheppard as both a player and a bandleader".

== Track listing ==
All compositions by Andy Sheppard except where noted

1. "Tipping Point" (Andy Sheppard, Michel Benita) – 6:16
2. "I Want to Vanish" (Elvis Costello) – 5:15
3. "Aoidh, Na Dean Cadal Idir (Part 1)" (Traditional) – 4:18
4. "Origin of Species" – 5:06
5. "They Aren't Perfect and Neither Am I" (Sebastian Rochford) – 5:09
6. "Medication" – 5:03
7. "Aoidh, Na Dean Cadal Idir (Part 2)" (Traditional) – 1:14
8. "The Impossibility of Silence" – 6:18
9. "I See Your Eyes Before Me" – 3:49
10. "A Letter" (Benita) – 4:18
11. "Aoidh, Na Dean Cadal Idir (Part 3)" (Traditional) – 3:29
12. "Looking for Ornette" – 3:10

== Personnel ==
- Andy Sheppard – tenor saxophone, soprano saxophone
- Eivind Aarset – guitar
- Michel Benita – double bass
- Sebastian Rochford – drums
