= Acoustic Ladyland =

British jazz-punk band

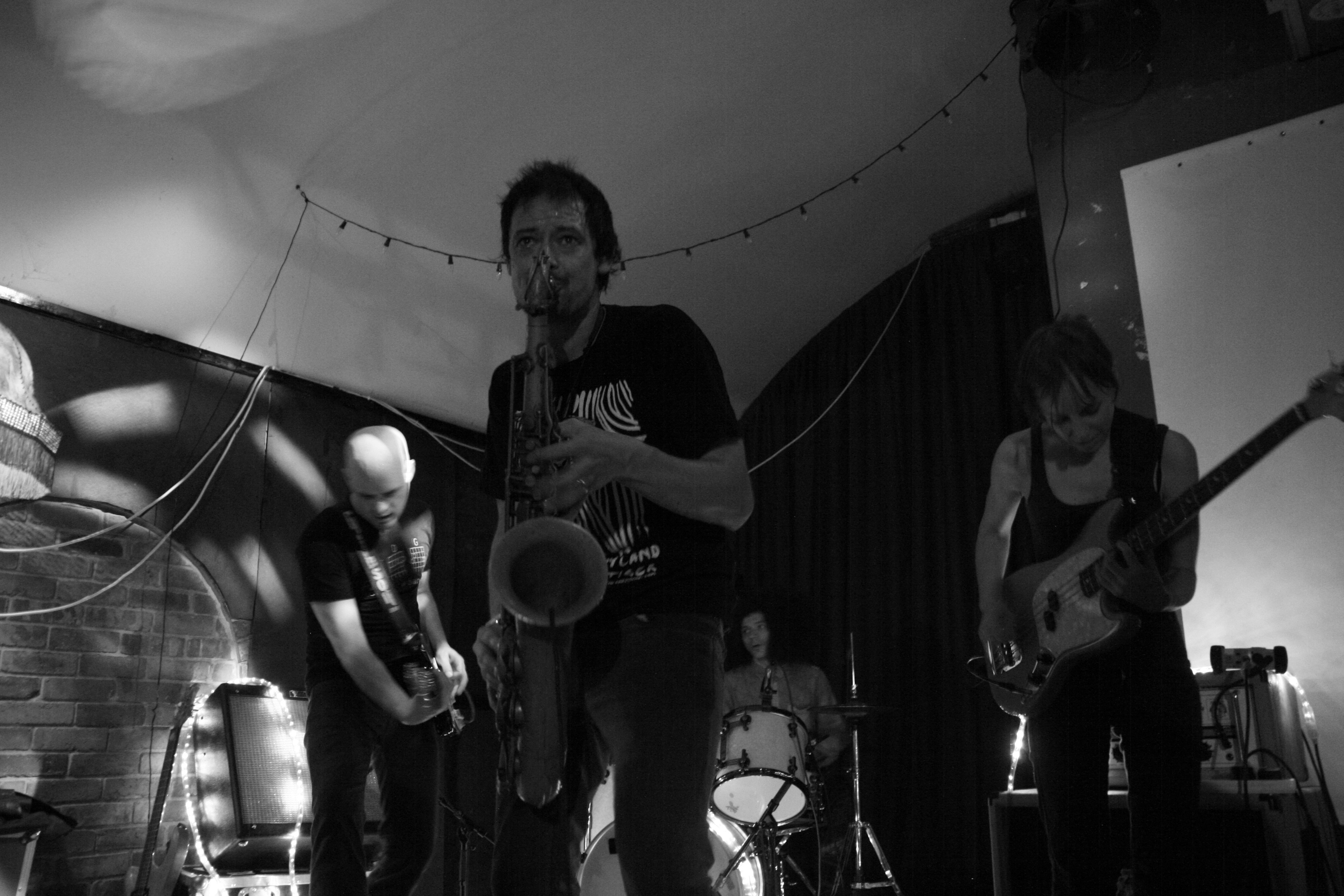
- Acoustic Ladyland at Taylor Johns House, Coventry, England

Background information
- Origin: London, England
- Genres: Jazz fusion, punk jazz
- Years active: 2001–2010
- Labels: Babel, V2
- Members: Pete Wareham; Seb Rochford; Chris Sharkey; Ruth Goller
- Past members: Tom Herbert; Tom Cawley
- Website: www.acousticladyland.com

Acoustic Ladyland was a London-based jazz-punk band consisting of Pete Wareham on vocals and saxophone, Seb Rochford on drums, Chris Sharkey on guitar, and Ruth Goller on bass guitar.

Tom Herbert of The Invisible played bass on their first three albums. They are part of the F-IRE Collective. Some of the members are now part of electronic jazz group Melt Yourself Down, whose debut album came out in 2013.

== History ==
Acoustic Ladyland formed in 2001 and released their first album Camouflage, an acoustic album inspired by Jimi Hendrix songs, in 2004. Their second album, Last Chance Disco, an electric set of self-penned compositions, was released in 2005, and was the Jazzwise album of the year.

On 13 September 2010 Pete Wareham announced that the band "as we know it will be no more" after a series of farewell gigs in December 2010. The band were chosen by Portishead to perform their last ever show at the ATP I'll Be Your Mirror festival that they curated in July 2011 at London's Alexandra Palace. Before beginning their performance, Wareham announced that after the farewell gig the band would be known as Silver Birch.

== Awards and honors ==
Acoustic Ladyland won the BBC Jazz Award for Best Band 2005. Their third album Skinny Grin was released on V2 Records in November 2006.

== Discography ==
- Camouflage (Babel, 2004)
- Last Chance Disco (Babel; Label Bleu 2005)
- Skinny Grin (V2, 2006)
- A.L.IVE (V2, 2007)
- Living with a Tiger (Strong & Wrong, 2009)
