= Mark Lockheart =

British jazz tenor saxophonist (born 1961)

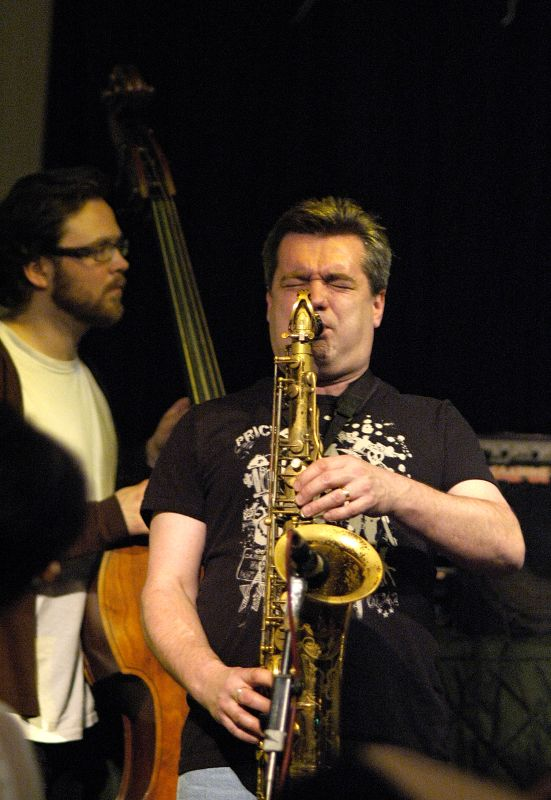
- Mark Lockheart performing with Polar Bear

Background information
- Born: 31 March 1961 (age 65); Lymington, England
- Genres: Jazz
- Occupations: Musician; Composer; Bandleader
- Instruments: Tenor saxophone; Soprano saxophone
- Years active: 1980s–present
- Labels: Edition; Linn; Harmonia Mundi; Subtone
- Member of: Shapeshifter, Perfect Houseplants, The Printmakers
- Formerly of: Polar Bear, Loose Tubes, Ellington in Anticipation, Malija
- Website: marklockheart.co.uk

Mark Lockheart (born 31 March 1961) is a British jazz composer and saxophonist who was a member of the Loose Tubes big band during the 1980s.

== Career ==
Lockheart was a prominent figure in the 1980s UK big band scene performing as a member of both Loose Tubes and Django Bates' Delightful Precipice. He went on to form jazz/folk quartet Perfect Houseplants with Huw Warren, Dudley Phillips, and Martin France. The band released five albums, collaborating on two with The Orlando Consort. Later, Lockheart formed an 11-piece Scratch Band to perform his original compositions and they recorded two albums including "Through Rose-Coloured Glasses" in 1998. In 2005 Lockheart put together his Big Idea ensemble and recorded the album "Moving Air".

In 2003, Lockheart joined the British jazz quintet Polar Bear. The group have recorded six albums, including Held on the Tips of Fingers, which was nominated for the Mercury Award and was selected one of the 100 Jazz Albums That Shook the World (2006 edition) by Jazzwise magazine.

A further project of Lockheart compositions was released in 2009 with the In Deep quintet featuring Liam Noble and Jasper Høiby. The next year, Lockheart was awarded Jazz Musician of the Year award at the All Party Parliamentary Jazz Awards 2010. His compositions have been recorded with the NDR Big Band.

"Ellington in Anticipation" was released to critical acclaim in 2013. As a septet featuring Sebastian Rochford, Tom Herbert, Liam Noble, Margrit Hasler, James Allsopp, and Finn Peters, Lockheart completed a UK wide tour supported by the Arts Council of England.

In July 2014 Lockheart formed the trio Malija with pianist Liam Noble and bassist Jasper Hoiby as a result of a request from the Rochester Jazz Festival in New York. Malija released its debut album entitled "The Day I Had Everything" on the Edition label in 2015, followed by "Instinct" in 2017.

Lockheart completed a major jazz/orchestral work titled Days on Earth for jazz sextet and 30-piece orchestra, released on Edition in January 2019. These were followed by the electronic quartet album "Dreamers" in 2022 and 13-piece jazz/rock fusion recording "Smiling" in 2024.

Lockheart has also played in sessions with Radiohead, Prefab Sprout, and Stereolab.

Lockheart teaches at Guildhall School of Music and Drama and Royal Academy of Music in London. He previously taught on the jazz staff at Trinity Laban Conservatoire of Music and Dance where notable British jazz musicians including Nubya Garcia, Laura Jurd, Elliot Galvin, Corrie Dick, Joe Armon-Jones and Femi Koleoso have studied.

== Awards and honors ==
- 1998 Peter Whittingham Award for Young Musicians for Through Rose Coloured Glasses
- 2001 Touring grant for the Arts for "Imaginary Dances" by the Arts Council of England
- 2005 Touring grant for the Arts for "The Big Idea" by the Arts Council of England
- 2010 Jazz Musician of the Year, All Party Parliamentary Jazz Awards
- 2013 Jazz CD of the Year for Ellington in Anticipation, Mojo magazine
- 2013 Touring grant for the Arts for "Ellington in Anticipation" by the Arts Council of England
- 2014 Jazz Electives Composer, THSH and Birmingham Music Service, 'Are We There Yet' commission.
- 2016 Jazz FM Instrumentalist of the year
- 2019 Composer Award from Paul Hamlyn Foundation Awards for Artists

== Discography ==
=== As leader ===
- Matheran (1993)
- Through Rose-Coloured Glasses (1998)
- Imaginary Dances (2002)
- Moving Air (2005)
- In Deep (2009)
- Days Like These (2010)
- Ellington in Anticipation (2013)
- The Day I Had Everything (Malija) (2015)
- Instinct (Malija) (2017)
- Days On Earth (2019)
- Dreamers (2022)
- Smiling (2024)
- Shapeshifter (2026)

=== As sideman ===
With Django Bates

- Summer Fruits (and Unrest) (JMT, 1993)
- Winter Truce (and Homes Blaze) (JMT, 1995)

With Loose Tubes

- Loose Tubes (1985)
- Delightful Precipice (1986)
- Open Letter (1988)
- Dancing on Frith Street (1989)
- Sad Africa (1989)
- Arriving (2015)

With Perfect Houseplants

- Perfect Houseplants (1992)
- Clec (1994)
- Snap Clatter (1997)
- New Folk Songs (2000)
- Extempore (1999) with The Orlando Consort
- Extempore 2 (2002) with The Orlando Consort

With Polar Bear

- Dim Lit (2005)
- Held on the Tips of Fingers (2007)
- Polar Bear (2008)
- Peepers (2010)
- In Each and Every One (2014)
- Same as You (2015)

With June Tabor

- Angel Tiger (1992)
- Against the Streams (1994)
- Aleyn (1997)
- A Quiet Eye (1999)

With Huw Warren

- Barrel Organ Far from Home (1997)
- Hundreds of Things a Boy Can Make (1998)
- God Only Knows (2005)
- New Day (2019)

With others

- Prefab Sprout, Steve McQueen (1985)
- Steve Berry, Trio (1988)
- Jah Wobble, Rising Above Bedlam (1991)
- High Llamas, Hawaii (1996)
- Stereolab, Fluoresences (1996)
- John Parricelli, Alba (2000)
- Radiohead, Kid A (2000)
- Colin Towns, Blue Touch Paper (2011)
- Colin Towns, Drawing Breath (2013)
- Kenny Wheeler and Norma Winstone, Mirrors (2013)
- Nikki Iles and Norma Winstone, The Printmakers – Westerly (2015)
- Jasper Høiby, Fellow Creatures (2016)
- Dave Holland, Norma Winstone and London Vocal Project etc., Vital Spark (Music of Kenny Wheeler) (2026)
