= Michel Benita =

French musician (born 1954)

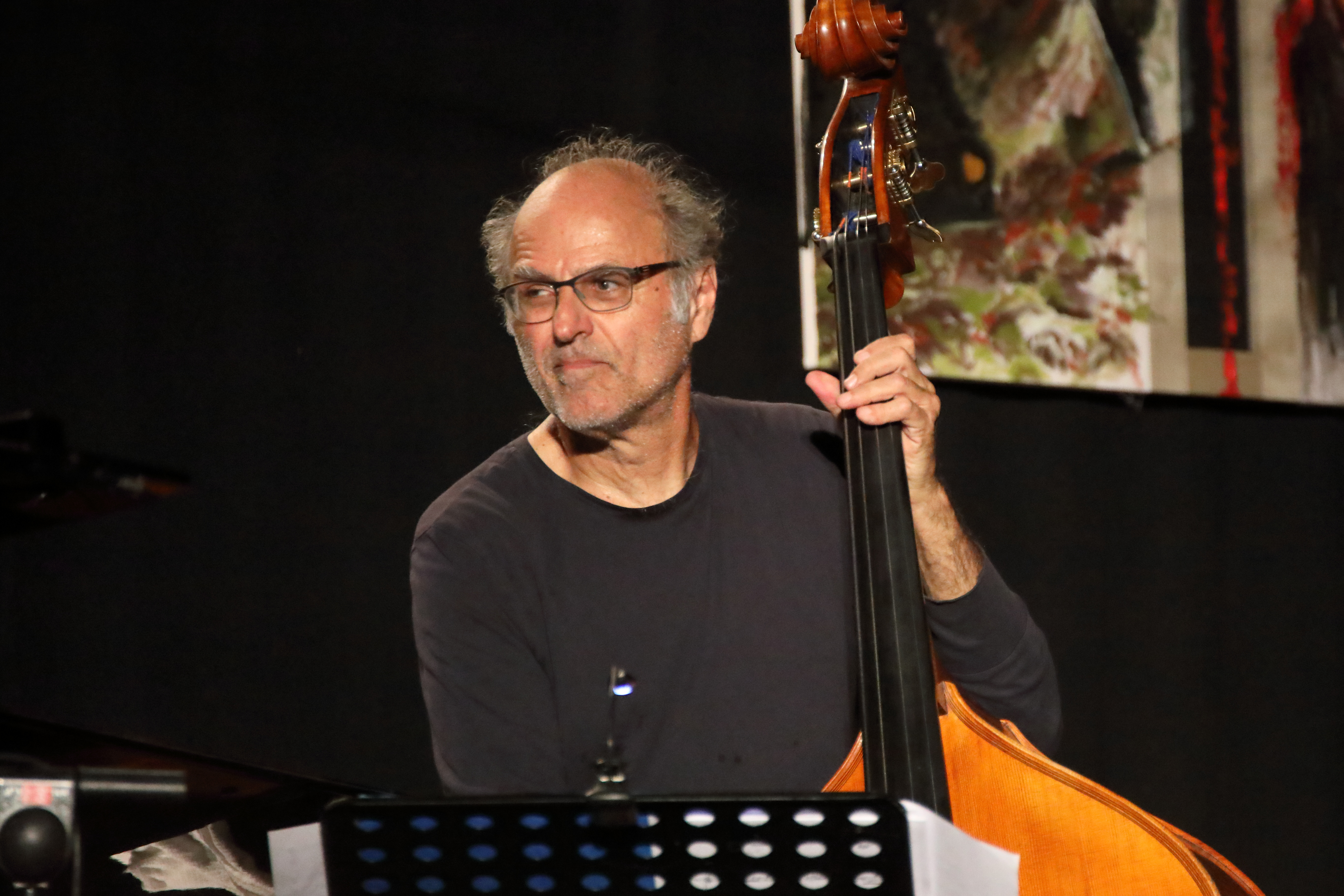
- Michel Benita at INNtöne Jazzfestival in 2019

Background information
- Born: 29 July 1954 (age 70); Algiers, Algeria
- Genres: Jazz
- Occupation(s): Musician, bandleader, composer
- Instrument: Double bass
- Labels: ECM Records, Label Bleu, ACT Music
- Website: michelbenita.com

Michel Benita (born 1954 in Algiers, Algeria) is a double bass player, prominent in jazz music since the 1980s. Benita moved to Paris in the early 1980s, performing extensively in local jazz clubs and concert venues alongside visiting players, expatriates, and local musicians. In 1986 he was invited to join the inaugural line-up of the Orchestre National de Jazz, under the direction of François Jeanneau. During his career Benita has worked with Aldo Romano, Marc Ducret, Horace Parlan, Martial Solal, Lee Konitz, Andy Sheppard, Dino Saluzzi, Dewey Redman, Erik Truffaz and Archie Shepp, among many others. He formed the ELB trio in 1999 with Vietnamese guitar player Nguyên Lê and American drummer Peter Erskine.

In recent years Benita has been closely associated with ECM Records, releasing a number of albums as leader but also as a sideman for saxophonist, Andy Sheppard.

== Awards ==
- Officer of the Order of Arts and Letters (2015)

== Discography ==
- Preferences (Label Bleu, 1990)
- Soul (Label Bleu, 1993)
- The Woman Next Door (Label Bleu, 1998)
- ELB (ACT, 2004)
- Drastic (BHM Productions, 2006)
- Dream Flight (ACT, 2008)
- Ramblin' (Blu Jazz, 2008)
- Un Soir au Club (Le Chant du Monde, 2010)
- Ethics (Zig Zag, 2010)
- River Silver (ECM, 2016)
- Looking at Sounds (ECM, 2020)

With Andy Sheppard

- Trio Libero (ECM, 2012)
- Surrounded by Sea (ECM, 2015)
- Romaria (ECM, 2018)
