= Living with a Tiger =

Living With A Tiger

Studio album by Acoustic Ladyland
- Released: 2009
- Genre: Punk jazz

Acoustic Ladyland chronology
Skinny Grin (2006)	Living With A Tiger (2009)

Professional ratings
Review scores
Source	Rating
Drowned in Sound	8/10 2009
All About Jazz	2009
NME	2009
The Skinny	2009
Sputnikmusic	2017

Living With A Tiger is a 2009 studio album by Acoustic Ladyland.

== Track listing ==
All songs by Acoustic Ladyland.

1. "Sport Mode"
2. "Glasto"
3. "Living With A Tiger"
4. "Gratitude"
5. "Have Another Go"
6. "Death By Platitude"
7. "Not So"
8. "The Mighty Q"
9. "Worry"
10. "You And I"

== Personnel ==
- Pete Wareham - tenor saxophone
- Chris Sharkey - guitar
- Ruth Goller - bass guitar
- Sebastian Rochford - drums

== Reviews ==
NME gave it 2/5 stars. While The Quietus said "Particularly when played loud, bringing to the fore the full guttural impact of Sharkey’s phenomenal guitar playing, ‘Living With A Tiger’ is a triumph, and certainly mauls and makes a mockery of the "avant garde for people who don’t like the avant garde" tag with which the band is sometimes lumbered."
