= Romaria (album) =

Studio album by the Andy Sheppard Quartet
- Released: February 16, 2018
- Recorded: April 2017
- Studio: Auditorio Stelio Molo RSI; Lugano, Switzerland
- Genre: Jazz
- Length: 48:05
- Label: ECM; ECM 2577
- Producer: Manfred Eicher

Andy Sheppard chronology
Surrounded by Sea (2015)	Romaria (2018)

Romaria is an album by the Andy Sheppard Quartet recorded in Switzerland in April 2017 and released on ECM February the following year. The quartet features rhythm section Eivind Aarset, Michel Benita and Sebastian Rochford.

== Reception ==
Professional ratings
Review scores
Source	Rating
AllMusic	4/5 stars
All About Jazz	3.5/5 stars
Blurt	3/5 stars
Tom Hull	B+
PopMatters	5/10
The Times	4/5 stars

All About Jazz's reviewer Geno Thackara said, "Where so much music treats silence as an exception, Andy Sheppard's recordings find it serving more as the rule. He's never been one for weaving flashy speed runs or feeling pressure to fill space. Even when his sax lines speed up from time to time through Romaria, they serve the mood with tasteful restraint, smoothly evoking the soothing coolness of its cover ... This quartet's easy chemistry creates a pretty soundscape both inviting and intriguing, and Romaria never loses the airy feel of a cozy reverie even at its busiest."

The AllMusic review by Thom Jurek notes "Sheppard's gift of restraint allows for bountiful interaction and irresistible musicality on Romaria, making it an essential addition to his catalogue and a fine extension of Surrounded by the Sea."

In JazzTimes, Mac Randall wrote "Sheppard likes to keep his volume at medium-low. But although he maintains a thoroughly English reserve, there’s plenty under the surface: romance, dry wit, tenderness and, above all, a questing spirit. He’s found some wonderful colleagues to help him with his search."

== Track listing ==
All compositions by Andy Sheppard, except as noted.

No.	Title	Writer(s)	Length
1.	"And a Day..."		8:06
2.	"Thirteen"		4:48
3.	"Romaria"	Renato Teixeira	5:11
4.	"Pop"		4:21
5.	"They Came from the North"		5:56
6.	"With Every Flower That Falls"		5:54
7.	"All Becomes Again"		7:07
8.	"Forever..."		6:42

== Personnel ==
=== Andy Sheppard Quartet ===
- Andy Sheppard – tenor saxophone, soprano saxophone
- Eivind Aarset – guitar
- Michel Benita – double bass
- Sebastian Rochford – drums
