= Movements in Colour =

Studio album by Andy Sheppard
- Released: 2009
- Recorded: February 2008
- Studio: Studios la Buissonne; Pernes-les-Fontaines, France
- Genre: Jazz
- Length: 57:21
- Label: ECM; ECM 2062
- Producer: Manfred Eicher

Andy Sheppard chronology
PS (2003)	Movements in Colour (2009)	Trio Libero (2012)

Movements in Colour is an album by British jazz saxophonist and composer Andy Sheppard recorded in February 2008 and released on ECM the following year.

== Reception ==
The AllMusic review by Thom Jurek awarded the album 3½ stars stating "Movements in Colour is a wonderfully breezy, airy, but very sophisticated recording that places an unusual instrument (the tabla) at the center of a jazz group that defies expectations and delivers something new yet familiar; this set is both well-conceived, and more importantly, well-executed."

Duncan Heining in his review for Jazzwise stated, "...they share a profound and uplifting grasp of the power of colour and that is certainly a word I would have to use in respect of Sheppard’s music. Here it shows in the way these five musicians combine to kaleidoscopic effect that matters most rather than their solo contributions. The impression throughout is of serving the music."

Professional ratings
Review scores
Source	Rating
Allmusic	3.5/5 stars
Jazzwise	4/5 stars

== Track listing ==
All compositions by Andy Sheppard

1. "La Tristesse du Roi" – 14:48
2. "Bing" – 6:00
3. "Nave Nave Moe" – 12:15
4. "Ballarina" – 3:43
5. "May Song" – 6:48
6. "We Shall Not Go to Market Today" – 8:06
7. "International Blue" – 5:41

== Personnel ==
- Andy Sheppard – soprano saxophone, tenor saxophone
- John Parricelli – acoustic guitar, electric guitar
- Eivind Aarset – guitar, electronics
- Arild Andersen – double bass, electronics
- Kuljit Bhamra – tabla, percussion
