= Trio Libero =

Studio album by Andy Sheppard
- Released: January 27, 2012
- Recorded: July 2011
- Studio: Auditorio Stelio Molo RSI; Lugano, Switzerland
- Genre: Jazz
- Length: 51:42
- Label: ECM; ECM 2252
- Producer: Manfred Eicher

Andy Sheppard chronology
Movements in Colour (2009)	Trio Libero (2012)	Surrounded by Sea (2015)

Trio Libero is an album by British saxophonist and composer Andy Sheppard recorded in Switzerland in July 2011 and released on ECM in January the following year.

== Reception ==
Professional ratings
Review scores
Source	Rating
Allmusic	4/5 stars
All About Jazz	5/5 stars
The Guardian	5/5 stars

The AllMusic review by Thom Jurek notes "Trio Libero reveals a truly adventurous group playing melodically improvised tunes that feel like formal, complete compositions; yet they move so much in their brief time frame—all but one tune here is between three and five minutes—they cannot be anything but. This set uses sometimes the smallest of sonic fragments to weave into emotionally resonant and musically sophisticated statements ... the short, taut execution in each track by Trio Libero on this deceptively active offering points to a new model, one whose focus is finding new ways to illustrate—via restraint—seemingly soft ambiguous sounds as lyric possibilities. They succeed in spades."

All About Jazz reviewer John Kelman said, "Rather than a demonstration of prowess, Trio Libero is proof that there's power in subtlety and drama in understatement—that tension can sometimes be found in the slightest of gestures. While time can only tell whether or not Trio Libero will actually achieve the status it deserves, Sheppard, Benita and Rochford have nevertheless created an album that stands apart from other saxophone trio recordings, a remarkable example of what happens when three masterful players check their egos at the door and surrender completely to the moment."

In The Guardian, John Fordham called it "a masterclass in imparting ambiguity and depth to the smallest sounds—and a remarkable demonstration of how the catchiness of a pop song can be imparted to a tone poem that seems to barely rise above a murmur."

== Track listing ==
All compositions by Andy Sheppard, Michel Benita and Sebastian Rochford except where noted

1. "Libertino" (Andy Sheppard) – 3:40
2. "Slip Duty" – 3:39
3. "I'm Always Chasing Rainbows" (Harry Carroll, Joseph McCarthy) – 4:17
4. "Spacewalk, Part 1" – 3:13
5. "Dia da Liberdade" (Sheppard) – 4:20
6. "Land of Nod" (Sheppard) – 3:46
7. "The Unconditional Secret" – 4:01
8. "Ishidatami" (Michel Benita) – 3:48
9. "Skin / Kaa" (Benita, Sebastian Rochford) – 6:09
10. "Spacewalk, Part 2" – 3:50
11. "Whereveryougoigotoo" – 3:41
12. "Lots of Stairs" (Rochford) – 3:14
13. "When We Live on the Stars..." – 4:04

== Personnel ==
- Andy Sheppard – tenor saxophone, soprano saxophone
- Michel Benita – double bass
- Sebastian Rochford – drums
