= Days on Earth =

Studio album by Mark Lockheart
- Released: 2019
- Recorded: December 2017
- Studio: British Grove Studios
- Genre: Jazz
- Length: 50:22
- Label: Edition
- Producer: Mark Lockheart

Mark Lockheart chronology
Salvator Mundi (2019)	Days on Earth (2019)	Dreamers (2022)

Days on Earth is a 2019 album by musician Mark Lockheart released on Edition Records.

The album is a six-piece suite of compositions by Lockheart for jazz sextet alongside 30-piece orchestra conducted by John Ashton Thomas. It was recorded at Mark Knopfler's British Grove Studios in Chiswick, West London over 2-days in December 2017. Featured musicians include Liam Noble, Seb Rochford and John Parricelli.

== Reception ==
The album was well received with reviews in many publications. The Guardian newspaper's John Fordham gave a 4-star review referencing "Lockheart’s laconically Wayne Shorter-ish sax sound" in a "fine, ambitious recording" which "invites a wider audience" than jazz lovers, while Mike Hobart of the Financial Times also awarded 4-stars to an album interweaving "spiky lines and smooth contours of contemporary European jazz with the shifting textures of a 30-piece orchestra." Jazzwise called the work Lockheart's "magnum opus" and "an impressive achievement in both concept and execution". DownBeat noted the "indelible, head-bobbing groove" of the track “Believers", and how "Lockheart frequently crafts segments within each of the seven songs, so an element of unpredictability arises and the overall momentum never sags.". MOJO deemed this album Lockheart's "boldest yet… Lush and ambitious, it's cinematically compelling from the off”. The album also received reviews in the German music magazine Rondo and in The Times.

== Live performances ==
The first performance and album launch were held at Milton Court Concert Hall (part of the Barbican Estate) with jazz sextet and the Studio Orchestra of Guildhall School of Music & Drama.

== Track listing ==
All tracks are composed by Mark Lockheart. The album is a six-piece suite with tracks 2 and 3 forming one piece.

1. "A View From Above" - 6:39
2. "Brave World" - 2:48
3. "This Much I Know Is True" - 7:23
4. "Party Animal" - 8:55
5. "Believers" - 9:49
6. "Triana" - 5:07
7. "Long Way Gone" - 9:41

== Personnel ==
=== Jazz Musicians ===
- Mark Lockheart - tenor & soprano sax
- John Parricelli - guitars
- Liam Noble - piano
- Alice Leggett - alto sax
- Tom Herbert - bass
- Seb Rochford - drums

=== Other featured soloists ===
- Laura Jurd - trumpet
- Rowland Sutherland - flutes

=== Orchestra ===
==== Violins ====
- Jackie Shave (leader of strings)
- Warren Zielinski
- Rita Manning
- Tom Pigott-Smith
- Magnus Johnston
- Marije Johnston
- Katherine Shave
- Patrick Kiernan
- Shlomy Dobrinsky
- Tom Crehan
- Ruth Ehrlich
- William Hillman
- Matthew Ward

==== Violas ====
- Bruce White
- Oli Langford
- Clare Finnimore
- Paul Cassidy
- Ruth Gibson

==== Cellos ====
- Caroline Dearnley
- Jonathan Tunnell
- Jacqueline Thomas
- David Daniels

==== Harp ====
- Helen Tunstall

==== Clarinets ====
- Nick Rodwell
- James Allsopp

==== Flutes ====
- Anna Noakes
- Rowland Sutherland

==== French Horns ====
- Jim Rattigan
- Laurence Davies

==== Trumpets ====
- Pat White
- Toby Street
- Laura Jurd on tracks 4 & 7

==== Trombone ====
Alistair White

==== Bass Trombone ====
Andy Wood

=== Other credits ===
- Produced by Mark Lockheart and Steve Baker
- Executive Producer Dave Stapleton
- Recorded at British Grove Studios, London on December 13 and 14 2017 by Martin Hollis
- Mixed by Steve Baker
- Mastered by Peter Beckman at Technology Works
