= Skinny Grin =

Studio album by Acoustic Ladyland
- Released: 20 November 2006
- Recorded: March and April 2006
- Genre: Punk jazz
- Length: 46:48
- Label: V2 Records
- Producer: Robert Harder, Paul Epworth, Acoustic Ladyland

Acoustic Ladyland chronology
Last Chance Disco (2005)	Skinny Grin (2006)	Living With A Tiger (2009)

Professional ratings
Review scores
Source	Rating
Stylus Magazine	A 2006
Drowned in Sound	9/10 2006
The Guardian	2006
Time Out London	5/6 2006
BBC - Collective	2006
The Independent	2006
The Penguin Guide to Jazz Recordings	3.5/4 stars

Skinny Grin is a 2006 album by Acoustic Ladyland, featuring the singles "Salt Water" and "Cuts & Lies". It was recorded at Eastcote Studios in London, engineered by Philip Bagenal and Al O'Connell. James Chance's guest appearance was recorded at The Cutting Room in New York City.

== Track listing ==
All songs arranged by Acoustic Ladyland except "Skinny Grin" by Acoustic Ladyland and Robert Harder.

1. "Road of Bones" (P. Wareham) - 3:06
2. "New Me" (P. Wareham, S. Rochford) - 2:22
3. "Red Sky" (P. Wareham) - 5:03
4. "Paris" (P. Wareham, M. Wareham, S. Rochford) - 2:49
5. "Your Shame" (P. Wareham, M. Wareham, S. Rochford) - 3:03
6. "Skinny Grin" (P. Wareham, M. Wareham) - 1:27
7. "Salt Water (Scott Walker mix)" (P. Wareham, S. Rochford) - 3:48
8. "Cuts & Lies" feat. Coco Electrik (P. Wareham, M. Wareham) - 3:15
9. "Glass Agenda" (P. Wareham, M. Wareham, S. Rochford) - 2:39
10. "That Night" (P. Wareham, M. Wareham) - 4:30
11. "The Rise" (P. Wareham, M. Wareham) - 3:20
12. "The Room" (P. Wareham) - 5:39
13. "Hitting Home" (P. Wareham, M. Wareham) - 6:03

== Personnel ==
- Peter Wareham - tenor and baritone saxophones, vocals
- Tom Cawley - keyboards, piano
- Tom Herbert - bass guitar
- Sebastian Rochford - drums

=== Additional personnel ===
- James Chance - alto saxophone (track 7)
- Coco Electrik - vocals (track 8)
- Alice Grant - vocals (track 4)
