= Camouflage (Acoustic Ladyland album) =

Studio album by Acoustic Ladyland
- Released: 7 July 2004
- Recorded: October 2003
- Genre: Punk jazz
- Label: Babel Label

Acoustic Ladyland chronology
Camouflage (2004)	Last Chance Disco (2005)

Camouflage is an album by Acoustic Ladyland that was recorded in October 2003 and released by Babel Label in 2004. It was the band's first album.

== Reception ==
Professional ratings
Review scores
Source	Rating
The Guardian	3/5 stars
The Penguin Guide to Jazz	3.5/4 stars

The Penguin Guide to Jazz wrote that "The pieces are cleverly orchestrated, Cawley doctoring his piano to make it work like electric guitar [...] while Rochford plays anything other than straight jazz time." John Fordham noted a Jimi Hendrix influence and commented "Hendrix inspiration or no, it doesn't really catch Hendrix's fire, and its themes and ensembles are less memorable than those of Babel's Polar Bear quartet, which also features Rochford, Wareham and Herbert."

== Track listing ==
1. "Some Other Sky"
2. "Marching Dice"
3. "Something Beautiful"
4. "Routinely Denied (No Return)"
5. "Nagel"
6. "Remote Impression"
7. "Little Miss Wingate"
8. "Brave Reply"
