= FMR Records =

English record label

- Founded: 1987
- Founder: Trevor Taylor
- Genre: Jazz, free improvisation
- Country of origin: UK
- Official website: www.fmr-records.com

FMR Records is a British record label. Founded by Trevor Taylor in 1987, it specialises in jazz and improvised music.

== Origins ==
Taylor is a drummer and percussionist who became increasingly interested in avant garde music. In the early 1970s he started Future Music, which was a record shop that expanded to seven branches. He founded the FMR (short for Future Music Records) label in 1987.

== Label history ==
FMR's first release was by saxophonist Tim Garland. This set the pattern for the label's early years, concentrating on British jazz musicians. Taylor also purchased the right to issue CD versions of successful albums released by other British musicians, including Mike Osborne, Howard Riley, John Surman and John Taylor; sales of these provided FMR with a financial boost. "By 2007 there were 250 CDs, DVDs and books in the catalogue".

Over time, the founder felt that mainstream jazz lacked originality and that the label needed a narrower focus to succeed, so he concentrated more on releasing improvised music. He observed in 2017 that recordings by British musicians were in the minority of FMR's releases. The label has also had to adapt to the industry reality of falling CD sales: in 2017, "FMR and the artist split the costs and the output 50/50, with the artist being responsible for promotion while the record company has to recoup its investment through the website or via a diminishing band of distributors." Some items from the catalogue can be bought as downloads from subradar.no, following an agreement between FMR and the Norway-based website.

Some musicians have had a large number of albums released by FMR. These include Paul Dunmall (more than 70) and Frode Gjerstad (over 40).

== Production and habits ==
Taylor selects music for release based on how well it matches the label's ethos. After that, he does not interfere with the recording: he commented that, "Occasionally I have suggested changing the order of tracks but that's it". Catalogue numbers have "'Visions' – prefixed 'V' – for original new music and 'Legacy' – prefixed 'L' – to re-issue on CD long out-of-print recordings of British jazz".

== See also ==
- Lists of record labels
