= Polar Bear (British band) =

British experimental jazz band

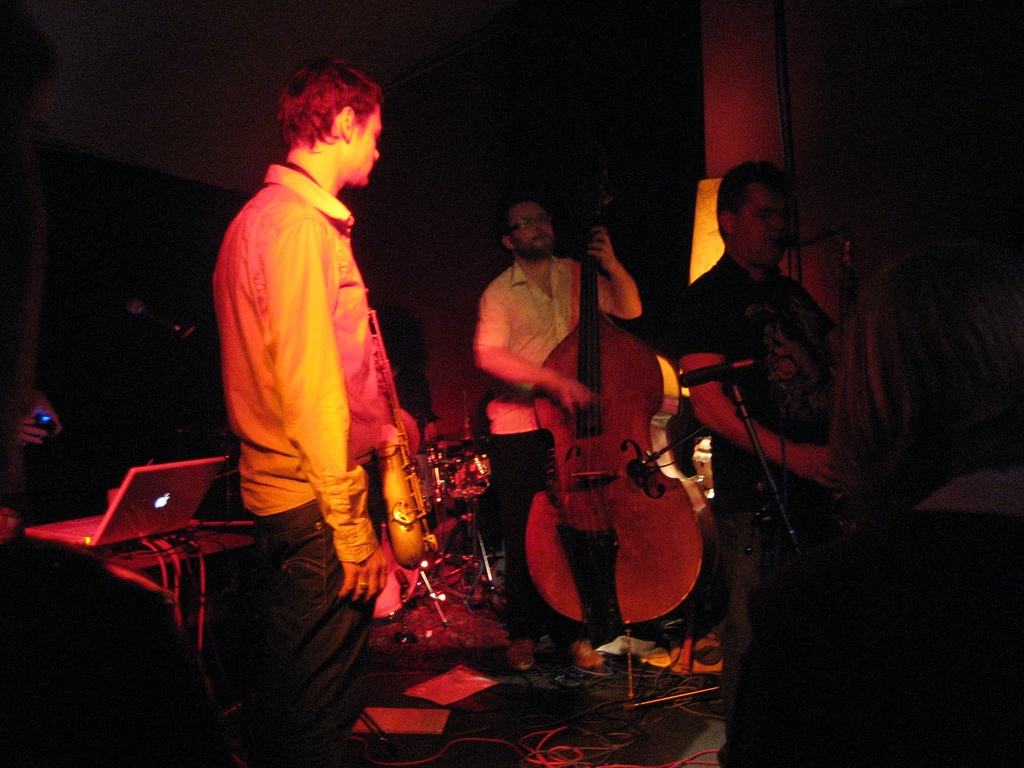
- Polar Bear performing in 2007

Background information
- Origin: London, England
- Genres: Experimental, jazz
- Years active: 2004–present
- Labels: Leaf, Babel, Tin Angel
- Members: Seb Rochford; Pete Wareham; Mark Lockheart; Tom Herbert; Leafcutter John
- Website: www.polarbearmusic.com

Polar Bear are a British experimental jazz band led by drummer Seb Rochford with Pete Wareham and Mark Lockheart on tenor saxophone, Tom Herbert on double bass and Leafcutter John on electronics and occasionally guitar or mandolin.

Polar Bear were nominated for the Best Band award at the BBC Jazz Awards 2004, while Rochford was nominated for the 'Rising Star' award. Their first album Dim Lit was released in the same year and was a small scale success.

Their second record, Held on the Tips of Fingers, merged elements of cool jazz, funk, dance music, free jazz, electronica and drum and bass and was, by comparison, a crossover hit, earning Polar Bear a nomination for the Mercury Music Prize in 2005. The success was all the more unusual for an almost purely instrumental album. The album was nominated for a BBC Jazz Award 2006. It was selected as one of "The 100 Jazz Albums That Shook The World" by Jazzwise magazine. and featured in The Guardian's list of "1000 Albums To Hear Before You Die". They have been involved with F-IRE Collective.

They released their self-titled third album, Polar Bear, in July 2008 with Tin Angel Records.

In 2010, the band released Peepers and mini-album Common Ground, a collaboration with Portuguese-born, London-based rapper Jyager, on The Leaf Label. Their 2014 album In Each And Every One was shortlisted for the Mercury Music Prize and in the same year they released the single "Cuckoo" in collaboration with singer and songwriter Jin Jin. In March 2015 Polar Bear released their sixth album Same as You, including the single "Don't Let The Feeling Go". This track features frequent collaborator Shabaka Hutchings (Sons of Kemet and The Comet Is Coming) on tenor saxophone and Rochford and Hannah Darling on vocals.

In 2015, Polar Bear were nominated for Best Jazz Act in the MOBO Awards and Urban Music Awards.

== Discography ==
- Dim Lit, (Babel, 2004)
- Held on the Tips of Fingers (Babel, 2005)
- Polar Bear, (Tin Angel, 2008)
- Peepers, (Leaf, 2010)
- In Each and Every One, (Leaf, 2014)
- Same as You, (Leaf, 2015)

Collaborations

- Common Ground with Jyager (Leaf, 2010)
- Cuckoo with Jin Jin (Leaf, 2014)
