= Leafcutter John =

British musician and artist

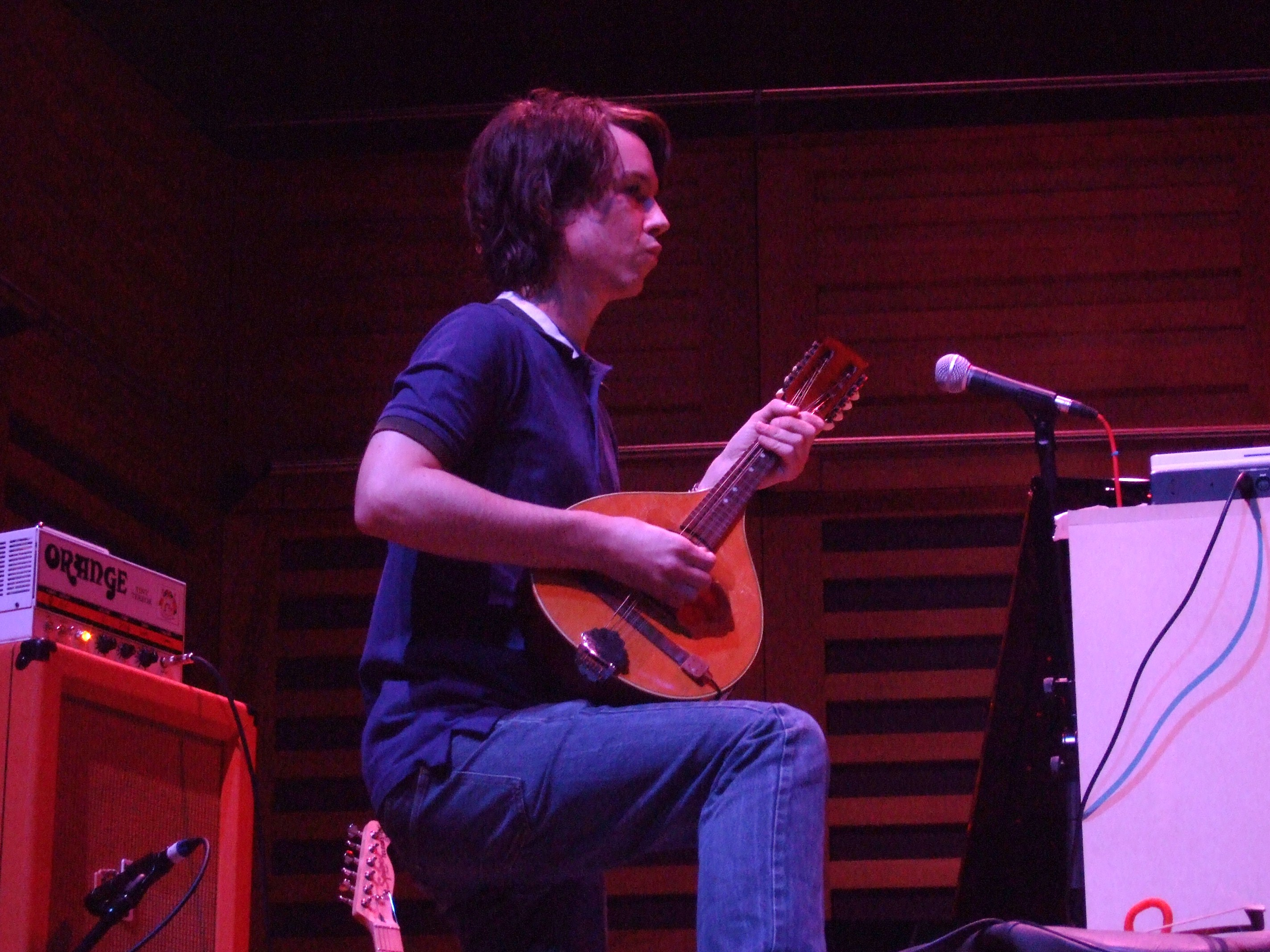
Leafcutter John

Leafcutter John is the recording name of John Burton, a UK-based musician and artist. He makes frequent use of Max/MSP in his compositions. Much of Burton's style is based in computer music and use of samples of everyday sounds. However, he also has roots as a folk musician, and this influence is apparent in his more recent work.

== Career ==
After graduating in Fine Art Painting at Norwich School of Art (1996–1998), Burton moved to London and after a year pursuing a career as a performance artist, began to concentrate on his musical work. He soon secured interest from Mike Paradinas, owner of independent electronics label Planet Mu. Paradinas encouraged Burton to develop his electro-acoustic folk hybrid and his first full-length release, Concourse EEP, was released in early 2000. His album, The Housebound Spirit, was a response to being mugged outside his London studio. The album deals with themes of increasing alienation and agoraphobia.

His fourth album The Forest and the Sea was nominated for Best Album at the Qwartz Electronic Music Awards 2007 and was described by comedian James Acaster as "a criminally overlooked record".

In 2019, Burton released his seventh album Yes! Come Parade With Us on James Holden’s label Border Community, featuring modular synth and field recordings from the Norfolk Coast Path.

Burton was a full-time member of the contemporary British jazz pioneers and Mercury Music Prize nominees Polar Bear, founded by drummer Seb Rochford.

He has performed with Imogen Heap, Shabaka Hutchings, Serafina Steer, Laura Jurd and Talvin Singh, supported Matmos and Otomo Yoshihide, and been in Beck's band at the Barbican, London. In 2007, he performed at Jarvis Cocker’s Meltdown Festival. He played alongside jazz pianist Michael Wollny at the opening night of the Bauhaus 100 festival in January 2019. In autumn/winter 2019, he supported The Comet Is Coming on their UK tour.

Leafcutter John is also an accomplished producer and remixer, having worked on projects for: DJ /rupture, Ed Dowie, Melt Yourself Down, Mu-ziq/Speedy J, Electric Company, Badly Drawn Boy, Capitol K, Bas Jan and others.

He lives in Sheffield, South Yorkshire.

== Projects ==
Leafcutter John has engaged in several projects, both commissioned and DIY. Examples include installing microphones under a creaky wooden floor to record and manipulate the sounds in a software program, growing and constructing piezoelectric crystal microphones, touring the Grand Union Canal, building a laser "microphone" and creating a massive morse code chorus for BBC Radio 3.

He has also worked on theatre, dance and poetry projects, including commissions from the Handspring Puppet Company, and choreographers Wayne McGregor and Shobana Jeyasingh.

Burton is a prodigious instrument builder and uses a self-built light-controlled musical interface at his shows. He won the Qwartz Electronic Music Award for Innovation in 2015. In 2017, he was a recipient of an artists award from the Paul Hamlyn Foundation.

== Discography ==
- The Sky Is Darker Than the Road (1998)
- Concourse EEP (2000) Planet Mu (ZIQ017) 12" and CD
- Microcontact (2001) Planet Mu (ZIQ022) CD
- Zeagma (2001) Planet Mu (ZIQ036) 7"
- The Housebound Spirit (2003) Planet Mu (ZIQ061) CD
- The Forest and the Sea (2006) Staubgold Records (Staubgold 68) CD/LP
- Tunis (2010) Tsuku Boshi CD
- Resurrection (2015) Desire Path Recordings (PATHWAY009) 12"/Digital
- Yes! Come Parade With Us (2019) Border Community (52BC) CD/LP
