= Babel Label =

English jazz record label

- Founded: 1994
- Founder: Oliver Weindling
- Genre: Jazz
- Country of origin: UK
- Location: London, England
- Official website: babellabel.co.uk

Babel Label is a jazz record label founded in 1994 by Oliver Weindling that specialises in British jazz, particularly the London scene. It released more than 130 recordings in its first 20 years, two of which were nominated for the Mercury Prize.

== Formation ==
Weindling was a banker in England in the 1980s when his interest in jazz expanded beyond a hobby. He became acquainted with musicians from the British big band Loose Tubes and with Iain Ballamy and Billy Jenkins. Weindling began organising concerts for London musicians and found that CDs were essential to generate publicity. In 1994, Motivated by this and by the difficulty of releasing the music that he was interested in, Weindling started the label and named it after the Biblical tower.

== Approach and releases ==
Despite being the label's owner and only full-time employee, Weindling does not seek to influence what the musicians play on the label's recordings. Although Babel is not formally linked with any studio or recording engineers, it tends to use a small number of each.

Babel has released both studio and concert recordings. "Most releases are joint ventures with musicians licensing their recordings to Babel and after-cost profits [are] shared." In 2014, all of the label's releases were available on CD and as downloads, with some also available on vinyl. In its first two decades, Babel released more than 130 albums.

Babel's catalogue includes albums by Jenkins, Steve Argüelles, Julian Argüelles, Huw Warren, Christine Tobin and Phil Robson. Held on the Tips of Fingers by Polar Bear and Knee-Deep in the North Sea by Portico Quartet were nominated for the Mercury Prize.

== See also ==
- Lists of record labels
