= Pitchfork Music Festival 2023 =

- Dates: July 21–23, 2023
- Locations: Union Park, Chicago, United States
- Website: pitchforkmusicfestival.com

The Pitchfork Music Festival 2023 was held from July 21 to 23, 2023 at the Union Park, Chicago, United States. The festival was headlined by The Smile, Big Thief, and Bon Iver. It was broadcast live on YouTube.

The festival was followed by after shows in various venues around Chicago with a line-up, including Grace Ives, Jockstrap, MJ Lenderman, Palm, Mavi, and Soul Glo.

== Headlining set lists ==
The Smile
1. "Pana-vision" (with Robert Stillman)
2. "The Opposite"
3. "A Hairdryer"
4. "Waving a White Flag"
5. "Under Our Pillows"
6. "We Don't Know What Tomorrow Brings"
7. "Colours Fly" (with Robert Stillman)
8. "Thin Thing"
9. "Skrting on the Surface"
10. "The Same"
11. "The Smoke" (with Robert Stillman)
12. "Friend of a Friend" (with Robert Stillman)
13. "You Will Never Work in Television Again" (with Robert Stillman)
14. "Bending Hectic"
15. "FeelingPulledApartByHorses"
Big Thief
1. "Words"
2. "Happy With You"
3. "Dried Roses"
4. "Certainty"
5. "Born For Loving You"
6. "Vampire Empire"
7. "Simulation Swarm"
8. "Contact"
9. "Shoulders"
10. "Not"
11. "Donut Seam"
12. "Free Treasure"
13. "Sadness as a Gift"
14. "Blue Lightning"
15. "Happiness"
16. "Change"
17. "Spud Infinity"
Bon Iver
1. "Yi"
2. "iMi"
3. "Lump Sum"
4. "666 ʇ"
5. "U (Man Like)"
6. "Heavenly Father"
7. "Jelmore"
8. "10 d E A T h b R E a s T ⚄ ⚄"
9. "715 – CRΣΣKS"
10. "Hey, Ma"
11. "PDLIF"
12. "Faith"
13. "Perth"
14. "Blood Bank"
15. "Skinny Love"
16. "Holocene"
17. "33 "GOD""
18. "Sh'Diah"
19. "Naeem"

== Lineup ==
Headline performers are listed in boldface. Artists listed from latest to earliest set times.

Green Stage
Friday, July 21	Saturday, July 22	Sunday, July 23
**The Smile**; Perfume Genius; Youth Lagoon; Sen Morimoto; Nourished by Time	**Big Thief**; King Krule; Panda Bear & Sonic Boom; 700 Bliss; Deeper	**Bon Iver**; Koffee; JPEGMafia; Lucrecia Dalt; Ariel Zetina

Red Stage
Friday, July 21	Saturday, July 22	Sunday, July 23
Alvvays; Nation of Language; Grace Ives; Contour	Weyes Blood; Snail Mail; MJ Lenderman; Palm	Kelela; Killer Mike; Jockstrap; Rachika Nayar

Blue Stage
Friday, July 21	Saturday, July 22	Sunday, July 23
Leikeli47; Ric Wilson; Jlin; Axel Boman; Mavi	Charlotte Adigéry & Bolis Pupul; Yaya Bey; Julia Jacklin; Vagabon; Black Belt Eagle Scout	Mdou Moctar; Hurray for the Riff Raff; Illuminati Hotties; Soul Glo; Florist
