= The Smile (Live at Montreux Jazz Festival, July 2022) =

Live album by the Smile
- Released: 14 December 2022
- Recorded: 12 July 2022
- Venues: Montreux Music & Convention Centre, Montreux, Switzerland
- Length: 35:03
- Label: XL

The Smile chronology
A Light for Attracting Attention (2022)	The Smile (Live at Montreux Jazz Festival, July 2022) (2022)	Europe: Live Recordings 2022 (2023)

The Smile (Live at Montreux Jazz Festival, July 2022) is the first live album by the English rock band the Smile, released on 14 December 2022 by XL Recordings. It comprises performances of songs from their first album, A Light for Attracting Attention (2022), recorded at Montreux Jazz Festival on 12 July. The Smile announced the album the day before its release, backed by a concert film available for 48 hours on YouTube.

== Reception ==
The Smile (Live at Montreux Jazz Festival, July 2022)
Aggregate scores
Source	Rating
Metacritic	78/100
Review scores
Source	Rating
Exclaim!	7/10
Pitchfork	8/10
Uncut	7/10

According to the review aggregator Metacritic, The Smile (Live at Montreux Jazz Festival, July 2022) received "generally favorable reviews" based on a weighted average score of 78 out of 100 from 4 critic scores. Spin's Jonathan Rowe said it demonstrated that the Smile were "no mere studio project" but "an actual, organic live band". In Pitchfork, Zach Schonfeld wrote: "Since the beginning, the Smile have been dogged by an eminently reasonable question: how is this not just two Radioheads stacked in a trench coat? The answer is right there in the title of this release. This band plays jazz, see." Both critics expressed disappointment that the album did not include the new songs the Smile had performed on tour.

== Track listing ==
All lyrics are written by Thom Yorke; all music is composed by Yorke, Jonny Greenwood, Tom Skinner, and Nigel Godrich.

The Smile (Live at Montreux Jazz Festival, July 2022) track listing
No.	Title	Length
1.	"Pana-vision"	4:17
2.	"Thin Thing"	4:24
3.	"The Opposite"	3:19
4.	"Speech Bubbles"	3:54
5.	"Free in the Knowledge / A Hairdryer"	11:54
6.	"The Smoke"	4:04
7.	"You Will Never Work in Television Again"	3:11
Total length:		35:03

- All track titles have "Live at Montreux Jazz Festival" in parentheses at the end.

== Personnel ==
- Thom Yorke – vocals, guitar, bass
- Jonny Greenwood – guitar, bass
- Tom Skinner – drums
- Mikko Gordon – engineering
