= Skrting on the Surface =

2022 single by the Smile

Single by the Smile

from the album A Light for Attracting Attention
- Released: 17 March 2022
- Genre: Alternative rock
- Length: 5:31
- Label: XL
- Songwriters: Jonny Greenwood; Nigel Godrich; Thom Yorke; Tom Skinner
- Producer: Nigel Godrich

The Smile singles chronology
"The Smoke" (2022)	"Skrting on the Surface" (2022)	"Pana-vision" (2022)

Music video
- "Skrting on the Surface" on YouTube

"Skrting on the Surface" is a song by the English rock band the Smile. It was released on 17 March 2022, as the third single from the Smile's debut album, A Light for Attracting Attention. "Skrting on the Surface" features guitar arpeggios in 11/8. The singer, Thom Yorke, and the guitarist, Jonny Greenwood, developed it from an unreleased song by their band Radiohead.

== History ==
Variations on the title phrase appeared on the Radiohead website around the time of their album OK Computer (1997). The Radiohead singer, Thom Yorke, first performed "Skrting on the Surface" in 2009 in a solo piano rendition while touring with his band Atoms for Peace. In 2012, Radiohead performed a different arrangement, which Pitchfork described as "a bleak slow-groover".

In 2021, Yorke and the Radiohead guitarist Jonny Greenwood announced a new band, the Smile, with the drummer Tom Skinner. Skinner said "Skrting on the Surface" was one of the first songs they worked on, and developed from Greenwood's 11/8 guitar arpeggios. Yorke realised that the earlier song fit "fit perfectly on top". Skinner recorded his drums in a single take, creating an "air of spontaneity". The song was recorded by Radiohead's producer, Nigel Godrich, in his studio in London.

The Smile debuted "Skrting on the Surface", then titled "Skating on the Surface", in a surprise performance for Live at Worthy Farm, a live video produced by Glastonbury Festival streamed on 22 May 2021. The single was released on 17 March 2022.

== Music video ==
The video was directed by Mark Jenkin, who also directed the previous Smile video, "The Smoke". It was shot on 16 mm film in the Rosevale Tin Mine in Cornwall, England. Water from the mine was used to develop the film by hand. The video was filmed during Storm Eunice and Storm Franklin; the crew were unaware of the storm damage while they worked underground.

== Reception ==
The Fader journalist Jordan Darville called the song "an unabashed channeling of what has made Greenwood and Yorke's creative partnership so successful over the course of many decades". Rolling Stone journalist Daniel Kreps said Skinner's drumming and Greenwood's arpeggios gave the song "a technicolour makeover" in comparison to the earlier versions.

== Track listing ==
The song, on specific streaming services and digital storefronts, also contains the Smile's two previously released singles.

No.	Title	Length
1.	"Skrting on the Surface"	5:31
2.	"The Smoke"	3:39
3.	"You Will Never Work in Television Again"	2:48

== Personnel ==
Credits adapted from album liner notes.

The Smile

- Thom Yorke — vocals, bass
- Jonny Greenwood — guitar, bass
- Tom Skinner — drums

Production

- Nigel Godrich

Additional musicians

- London Contemporary Orchestra
  - Hugh Brunt – orchestration
  - Eloisa-Fleur Thom – violin
  - Alessandro Ruisi – violin
  - Zara Benyounes – violin
  - Sophie Mather – violin
  - Agata Daraskaite – violin
  - Charlotte Bonneton – violin
  - Zoe Matthews – viola
  - Clifton Harrison – viola
  - Oliver Coates – cello
  - Max Ruisi – cello
  - Clare O’Connell – cello
- Jason Yarde – saxophone
- Robert Stillman – saxophone
- Chelsea Carmichael – flute
- Nathaniel Cross – trombone
- Byron Wallen – trumpet
- Theon Cross – tuba
- Tom Herbert – double bass
- Dave Brown – double bass
