= Pana-vision =

2022 single by the Smile

Single by the Smile

from the album A Light for Attracting Attention
- Released: 3 April 2022
- Genre: Indie rock; post-rock; classical
- Length: 4:08
- Label: XL
- Songwriters: Jonny Greenwood; Nigel Godrich; Thom Yorke; Tom Skinner
- Producer: Nigel Godrich

The Smile singles chronology
"Skrting on the Surface" (2022)	"Pana-vision" (2022)	"Free in the Knowledge" (2022)

Music video
- "Pana-vision" on YouTube

"Pana-vision" is a song by the English rock band the Smile. It was released on 3 April 2022 as the fourth single from their debut album, A Light for Attracting Attention.

== Music video ==
An animated visualizer directed by Sabrina Nichols, using imagery by the Radiohead artist Stanley Donwood, was released alongside on 3 April 2022. Mxdwn.com writer Lauren Floyd called the video "cinematic", saying it features "dramatically elongated and drawn out shapes and figures ... parallel to Yorke's airy falsetto".

On 20 July 2022, the scene from the series finale of the British television series Peaky Blinders that used "Pana-vision" in full three months earlier was uploaded as a separate live-action music video for the song. The music video was directed by series director Anthony Byrne.

== Reception ==
"Pana-vision" received favourable reviews. Loudwire said its "cinematic" title fit its "picturesque piano-driven exploration". The Uproxx writer Adrian Spinelli called the song "decidedly sinister" and said the piano "challenges your mind to understand how the song is supposed to make you feel". Cleber Facchi of Música Instântanea compared the song favourably to Radiohead's 2016 album A Moon Shaped Pool.

== Use in media ==
"Pana-vision" was used in the Peaky Blinders episode "Lock and Key", which served as the series finale. The episode also featured "That's How Horses Are", a solo song by Yorke.

== Track listing ==
The song, on specific streaming services and digital storefronts, also contains the three previously released singles from the band:

No.	Title	Length
1.	"Pana-vision"	4:08
2.	"Skrting on the Surface"	5:31
3.	"The Smoke"	3:39
4.	"You Will Never Work in Television Again"	2:48

== Personnel ==
Credits adapted from album liner notes.

The Smile

- Thom Yorke - vocals, piano
- Jonny Greenwood - bass
- Tom Skinner - drums

Production

- Nigel Godrich

Additional musicians

- London Contemporary Orchestra
  - Hugh Brunt – orchestration
  - Eloisa-Fleur Thom – violin
  - Alessandro Ruisi – violin
  - Zara Benyounes – violin
  - Sophie Mather – violin
  - Agata Daraskaite – violin
  - Charlotte Bonneton – violin
  - Zoe Matthews – viola
  - Clifton Harrison – viola
  - Oliver Coates – cello
  - Max Ruisi – cello
  - Clare O’Connell – cello
- Jason Yarde – saxophone
- Robert Stillman – saxophone
- Chelsea Carmichael – flute
- Nathaniel Cross – trombone
- Byron Wallen – trumpet
- Theon Cross – tuba
- Tom Herbert – double bass
- Dave Brown – double bass
