= Friend of a Friend (Smile song) =

2024 song by the Smile

Single by the Smile

from the album Wall of Eyes
- Released: 9 January 2024
- Studio: Abbey Road Studios
- Genre: Jazz rock
- Length: 4:35
- Label: XL
- Songwriters: Thom Yorke; Jonny Greenwood; Tom Skinner
- Producer: Sam Petts-Davies

The Smile singles chronology
| "Wall of Eyes" (2023) | "Friend of a Friend" (2024) | "Don't Get Me Started" / "The Slip" (2024) |

"Friend of a Friend" is a song by the English rock band the Smile, released on 9 January 2024 by XL Recordings. It was the third single released from the Smile's second album, Wall of Eyes. The music video was directed by Paul Thomas Anderson.

The Smile wrote "Friend of a Friend" on tour and first performed it in 2022. It features piano, saxophone and strings. Critics likened it to the work of the Beatles and 1970s singer-songwriters.

== Composition ==
The Smile first performed "Friend of a Friend" on 16 May 2022, in Zagreb, Croatia. The singer, Thom Yorke, said they had written it that day.

"Friend of a Friend" begins with Yorke singing over a "meandering" bassline, Jonny Greenwood enters on piano and Tom Skinner enters on drums. The song also features saxophone by the American jazz composer Robert Stillman and strings performed by the London Contemporary Orchestra. The lyrics were inspired by footage of Italians singing on their balconies during the COVID-19 lockdowns, and criticise cronyism in the British Conservative Party.

Exclaim! described "Friend of a Friend" as "more twisting and jazzy" than the Smile's other material. In Stereogum, Chris DeVille said it was a "bit of a curveball where the Smile is concerned", describing it as "off-kilter 70s-style piano-pop", and likened it to the work of Randy Newman or Ben Folds. He likened the strings to "A Day in the Life" by the Beatles. The Guardian critic Alexis Petridis said it had "the relaxed charm of an early 70s singer-songwriter album" and likened it to Paul McCartney. Writing for NME, Liberty Dunworth said it had an "ethereal atmosphere ... which gradually develops".

== Release ==
"Friend of a Friend" was released on 9 January 2024 as the third single from the Smile's second album, Wall of Eyes. The music video, directed by Paul Thomas Anderson, has the Smile performing for a room of children. It premiered on 19 January at the Prince Charles Cinema in London, as part of a series of screenings at independent cinemas around the world to promote Wall of Eyes.

== Reception ==
Chris DeVille of Stereogum cited "Friend of a Friend" as one of their favourites on Wall of Eyes. While the Wall Street Journal critic Mark Richardson felt that Wall of Eyes was "insular and closed off", he wrote that "Friend of a Friend" was a "welcome exception, a rare and lovely excursion for Mr. Yorke into classic singer-songwriter terrain". Robin Murray of Clash said that "Friend of a Friend" showed the Smile at "their most direct – succinct (by their towering standards) it achieves a real sense of dynamism". In Pitchfork, Jazz Monroe wrote that it was “divine, even hummable" and Yorke's "deftest lunge for your heartstrings" since the Radiohead song "True Love Waits".

== Personnel ==
Credits adapted from liner notes.

The Smile

- Jonny Greenwood – guitars, bass, piano, synthesisers, orchestral arrangements, cello, Max MSP
- Tom Skinner – drums, synthesisers, percussion
- Thom Yorke – voice, guitars, bass, piano, synthesisers, lyrics

Production

- Sam Petts-Davies – production, engineering, mixing
- Oli Middleton – engineering
- Tom Bailey – orchestral engineering
- Pete Clements – studio tech
- Joe Wyatt – Abbey Road recording, assistant engineering
- Tom Ashpitel – Abbey Road recording
- Greg Calbi – mastering

Additional musicians

- London Contemporary Orchestra, led by Eloisa-Fleur Thom
  - Hugh Brunt – conducting
  - Robert Stillman – clarinet, saxophone
  - Pete Wareham – flute
