= Cyrano (soundtrack) =

2021 soundtrack album

Cyrano (Original Motion Picture Soundtrack)

Soundtrack album / cast recording by Aaron Dessner, Bryce Dessner and the cast of Cyrano
- Released: December 10, 2021
- Recorded: 2018–2021
- Studios: Abbey Road Studios, London
- Genre: Film soundtrack
- Length: 78:00
- Label: Decca
- Producers: Aaron Dessner; Bryce Dessner

Aaron Dessner chronology
C'mon C'mon (2021)	Cyrano (2021)	Dandellion (2023)

Bryce Dessner chronology
C'mon C'mon (2021)	Cyrano (2021)	Bardo, False Chronicle of a Handful of Truths (2022)

Singles from Cyrano (Original Motion Picture Soundtrack)
- 1. "Someone To Say" Released: October 8, 2021; 2. "Somebody Desperate" Released: December 3, 2021

Cyrano (Original Motion Picture Soundtrack) is the soundtrack to the 2021 film of the same name directed by Joe Wright, starring Peter Dinklage as the titular Cyrano de Bergerac. The film is scored by Aaron Dessner and Bryce Dessner, who also contributed the film's original songs performed by the cast and written by Matt Berninger and Carin Besser. The London Contemporary Orchestra conducted by Robert Ames and Dessner and Icelandic pianist Víkingur Ólafsson, performed the score. The soundtrack, released by Decca Records on December 10, 2021, preceded with two singles: "Someone To Say" and "Somebody Desperate".

== Background ==
Erica Schmidt, Dinklage's wife, directed the theatrical adaptation of 1897 Edmond Rostand play Cyrano de Bergerac in 2018. When plans for a film adaptation happened with Metro-Goldwyn-Mayer acquiring the play's rights in August 2020, Schmidt wanted to collaborate with The National's Aaron and Bryce Dessner for the score as she had been a big fan of the band and while stating it her in a letter to songwriter Matt Berninger, Bryce happened to read the play earlier at her house upstate in New York, where he had given few sketches of the band's unfinished music and Schmidt sent her a playlist of the songs used in the background. In an interview to Billboard in 2021, Bryce described about the contemporary adaptation where the songs "replace the letters and long monologues of 19th century poetry, which are so classic but for a modern audience it makes a lot of sense". Though they were not anticipated on writing musicals, and having no idea about it, both had an interest on how musicals are being adapted, hence they also took positions as songwriters with Berninger and Carin Besser.

The recording process fragmented due to the COVID-19 pandemic, where both the brothers (living in France and New York separately) had to virtually communicate through Zoom to supervise the score (also for C'mon C'mon). Bryce joined with Robert Ames to conduct the sessions performed by London Contemporary Orchestra at Abbey Road Studios, and Víkingur Ólafsson recorded piano solos in Iceland. With COVID-19 restrictions eased at parts of Europe in September, Bryce went to Sicily (where the film was shot) to supervise the cast rehearsals onset for three weeks and recorded most of the score there. Bryce described the musical process as "Before they shot every scene the music was discussed, and they shot around the music – it's woven in at a much, much deeper level than we're used to".

For the songs originally written for the stage play, Beringer and Besser reworked the tunes around four years, with Aaron claiming that the music evolved within the stage productions and the film version was elevated with Joe's work on developing further with Erica and focusing what he wanted to achieve. All the vocals and instrumentation were recorded live. Schmidt felt the song lyrics were not intended to be propulsive, rather than being intimate and reflective, saying "It was actually what poetry is, that kind of window into the soul. As opposed to composing for the audience, or showing off, [the music was] much more soulful."

== Release ==
Cyrano's soundtrack was announced on October 6, 2021, which had 27 tracks (including both the original music and score). It was set for release on December 10, 2021, by Decca Records, three weeks before the originally slated release date at United Kingdom. The first single from the album, "Someone To Say" released on October 8, and the second track, "Somebody Desperate" released on December 3. The soundtrack was released exclusively at 180-gram double vinyl, through Target Corporation on April 1, 2022.

== Track listing ==
All lyrics are written by Matt Berninger and Carin Besser; all music is composed by Aaron Dessner and Bryce Dessner.

Cyrano (Original Motion Picture Soundtrack) track listing
No.	Title	Performer(s)	Length
1.	"Intro"	Bryce Dessner; Aaron Dessner; London Contemporary Orchestra	0:37
2.	"Opening"	Bryce Dessner; Aaron Dessner; Víkingur Ólafsson; London Contemporary Orchestra	1:58
3.	"Someone To Say"	Haley Bennett; Bryce Dessner; Aaron Dessner; Ólafsson; London Contemporary Orchestra	4:21
4.	"When I Was Born"	Peter Dinklage; Bryce Dessner; Aaron Dessner; Ólafsson; London Contemporary Orchestra	2:04
5.	"Dying"	Bryce Dessner; Aaron Dessner; Ólafsson; London Contemporary Orchestra	1:09
6.	"Madly"	Dinklage; Bryce Dessner; Aaron Dessner; Ólafsson; London Contemporary Orchestra	3:27
7.	"Ten Men Fight"	Bryce Dessner; Aaron Dessner; London Contemporary Orchestra	1:44
8.	"Your Name"	Dinklage; Bryce Dessner; Aaron Dessner; Ólafsson; London Contemporary Orchestra	3:12
9.	"Garrison Arrival"	Bryce Dessner; Aaron Dessner; Ólafsson; London Contemporary Orchestra	1:06
10.	"Not A Toy"	Bryce Dessner; Aaron Dessner; Ólafsson	1:56
11.	"Someone To Say (Reprise)"	Dinklage; Kelvin Harrison Jr.; Bryce Dessner; Aaron Dessner; Ólafsson; London Contemporary Orchestra	2:51
12.	"Every Letter (Radio Edit)"	Bennett; Dinklage; Harrison Jr.; Bryce Dessner; Aaron Dessner; Ólafsson; London Contemporary Orchestra	3:13
13.	"I Love You"	Bryce Dessner; Aaron Dessner; Ólafsson; London Contemporary Orchestra	3:23
14.	"I Need More (Radio Edit)"	Bennett; Bryce Dessner; Aaron Dessner; Ólafsson; London Contemporary Orchestra	2:52
15.	"Overcome"	Bennett; Dinklage; Bryce Dessner; Aaron Dessner; London Contemporary Orchestra	4:26
16.	"The Kiss"	Bryce Dessner; Aaron Dessner; Ólafsson; London Contemporary Orchestra	1:37
17.	"Marry Christian"	Bryce Dessner; Aaron Dessner; London Contemporary Orchestra	2:46
18.	"What I Deserve"	Ben Mendelsohn; Bryce Dessner; Aaron Dessner; Ólafsson; London Contemporary Orchestra	2:52
19.	"Saying Goodbye"	Bryce Dessner; Aaron Dessner; Ólafsson; London Contemporary Orchestra	1:44
20.	"Close My Eyes"	Harrison Jr.; Glen Hansard; Sam Amidon; Bryce Dessner; Aaron Dessner; London Contemporary Orchestra	4:03
21.	"Wherever I Fall - Part 1"	Hansard; Amidon; Scott Folan; Bryce Dessner; Aaron Dessner; Ólafsson; London Contemporary Orchestra	6:08
22.	"Wherever I Fall - Part 2"	Bryce Dessner; Aaron Dessner; Ólafsson; London Contemporary Orchestra	6:01
23.	"He Will Be Here"	Bryce Dessner; Aaron Dessner; Ólafsson; London Contemporary Orchestra	3:39
24.	"Cyrano's Message"	Bryce Dessner; Aaron Dessner; Ólafsson; London Contemporary Orchestra	1:29
25.	"No Cyrano"	Bennett; Dinklage; Bryce Dessner; Aaron Dessner; Ólafsson; London Contemporary Orchestra	4:11
26.	"Somebody Desperate"	The National	3:55
27.	"Saying Goodbye (Piano Solo)"	Bryce Dessner; Aaron Dessner; Ólafsson	1:26
Total length:			1:18:00

== Reception ==
Justin Velucci of Spectrum Culture wrote "As composers, the Dessners make beautiful and romantic music, but it's really on Berninger and Erica Schmidt, who wrote the book for the stage production, to steal the day and carry the weight of making this thing sing." Peter Debruge of Variety opined that the "lovely, wistful pop ballads restores the show's sense of poetry". Tim Grierson of Screen International complimented that the film "is especially aided by the original musical's songs [...] For fans of the group's guarded romanticism, Cyrano gives their music a bolder canvas". Stephen Farber of The Hollywood Reporter felt that the music "never overwhelm the humor or the drama" with some of the songs were "likeable" and some being "forgettable". Pete Hammond of Deadline Hollywood wrote "The score beautifully complements the story without ever overpowering it, and there are several highlights from a cast with real musical chops, as it turns out. Standouts include the stunning battlefield anthem 'Wherever I Fall', 'Close My Eyes' and an original for the film called 'Every Letter', but this is one score where each number has a purpose in moving the story along to a final act that is bittersweet, moving and quietly powerful in its sheer humanity and love."

== Charts ==
Chart (2022)	Peak position
UK Album Downloads (OCC)	66
UK Soundtrack Albums (OCC)	7

== Accolades ==
Accolades received by House of Gucci
Award	Date of ceremony	Category	Recipient(s)	Result	Ref.
Detroit Film Critics Society	December 6, 2021	Best Use of Music	Cyrano	Nominated	
Hollywood Critics Association	February 28, 2022	Best Original Song	Aaron Dessner, Bryce Dessner, Matt Berninger, Carin Besser, Peter Dinklage, Haley Bennett, Kelvin Harrison Jr. — ("Every Letter")	Nominated	
Hollywood Music in Media Awards	November 17, 2021	Original Song — Feature Film	Aaron Dessner, Bryce Dessner, Matt Berninger, Carin Besser, Peter Dinklage, Haley Bennett, Kelvin Harrison Jr. — ("Every Letter")	Nominated	
Hollywood Music in Media Awards	November 17, 2021	Original Song – Onscreen Performance	Aaron Dessner, Bryce Dessner, Matt Berninger, Carin Besser, Glen Hansard, Sam Amidon, Scott Folan — ("Whenever I Fall")	Nominated	
Houston Film Critics Society Awards	January 19, 2022	Best Original Song	Aaron Dessner, Bryce Dessner, Matt Berninger, Carin Besser, Glen Hansard, Sam Amidon, Scott Folan — ("Whenever I Fall")	Won	
Washington D.C. Area Film Critics Association	December 6, 2021	Best Score	Aaron and Bryce Dessner	Nominated	
