= Overlord (soundtrack) =

2018 film soundtrack album

Overlord (Music from the Motion Picture)

Film score by Jed Kurzel
- Released: November 9, 2018
- Recorded: 2018
- Studios: AIR Studios, London
- Genre: Film score
- Length: 49:50
- Label: Paramount Music
- Producer: Jed Kurzel

Jed Kurzel chronology
Jupiter's Moon (2017)	Overlord (2018)	The Mustang (2019)

Overlord (Music from the Motion Picture) is the film score composed by Jed Kurzel to the 2018 film Overlord directed by Julius Avery. The film score was conducted and orchestrated by Hugh Tieppo-Brunt and performed by the London Contemporary Orchestra. It was released through Paramount Music on November 9, 2018, day-and-date with the film's release.

== Development ==
In April 2018, it was announced that Jed Kurzel will compose the film score for Overlord, having previously worked with Avery on Son of a Gun (2014). Due to the combination of genres, such as war, horror and drama, Kurzel considered it to be his most unusual and challenging film in his career. Kurzel then focused on creating minimalistic music to provide an eerie and unsettling tone. The visual served as the primary inspiration for Overlord, due to its dark and polished cinematography that made him diversify the range to subtle, action music to more raucous action cues. Furthermore, Kurzel tried to find the emotional core of the characters, to provide a layer of feeling rather than a thematic approach. The score was conducted by Hugh Tieppo-Brunt and performed by the London Contemporary Orchestra.

== Release ==
The soundtrack was released on digital only on November 9, 2018, by Paramount Music Corporation.

== Track listing ==
All tracks are written by Jed Kurzel.

No.	Title	Length
1.	"Arrival"	2:01
2.	"Hanging Trees"	1:19
3.	"Mist Patrol"	1:34
4.	"Devil Dogs"	1:41
5.	"Lead the Way"	1:45
6.	"Shooting"	1:00
7.	"Auntie Scare"	2:29
8.	"Wafner Arrives"	1:18
9.	"Pauls Ball"	1:55
10.	"Approaching the Church"	3:01
11.	"Serum"	2:32
12.	"Escape With Rosenfeld"	1:57
13.	"I'm Gonna Win This One"	3:33
14.	"Watching Soldiers"	0:55
15.	"Chase Dies"	1:31
16.	"Re-Animation"	2:15
17.	"Dead Again"	1:20
18.	"The Mistake Is Loose"	1:55
19.	"Battle"	0:52
20.	"Chloe Escapes"	1:29
21.	"Wafner and Doc"	2:33
22.	"Hang Time"	2:08
23.	"Boyce Dunk"	2:25
24.	"Take It Down"	2:30
25.	"Time Bomb"	1:45
26.	"Victory"	2:07
Total length:		49:50

== Reception ==
Leo Mayr of Film.Music.Media wrote "Overlord isn't a revolutionary movie or score. It's plain and simple fun. But the way every aspect of the film and its music has been polished is quite remarkable. There's not a lot that'll surprise you, but if two hours of nazi zombies is what you're looking for, then Overlord won't disappoint." Ben of Soundtrack Universe wrote "Despite not being a groundbreaking new work in the horror/action genre, Kurzel's efforts for Overlord are fine. Not incredible, but perfectly fine and enjoyable for genre fans on the roughly fifty-minute album presentation. Ultimately, if one wants to hear what Kurzel can accomplish with roughly the same soundscape... just listen to Alien: Covenant."

Amy Nicholson of Variety wrote "Jed Kurzel's cello score stabs at the eardrums". The Hollywood Reporter called Kurzel's score "overbearing". Demetrios Matheou of Screen International wrote "Jed Kurzel's urgent soundtrack keeps the tempo lively". Mike Mazzanti of The Film Stage wrote "Jed Kurzel's score too has chimes of early Carpenter, before it slithers into more overtly ghoulish concord and manic melodies. Strings whine and sinister pulses sound like a prowling pack of rabid wolves." Joseph Walsh of Time Out described it a "thundering score". Karen Han of Polygon wrote "the score by Jed Kurzel is heavy on strings". D. M. Bradley of The Adelaide Review said that Kurzel's score "has a vaguely odd structure".

== Personnel ==
Credits adapted from Paramount Music

- Music composer: Jed Kurzel
- Orchestrator and conductor: Hugh Brunt
- Music preparation: David Foster
- Performer: London Contemporary Orchestra
- Concertmaster: Galya Bisengalieva
- Orchestra contractors: Victoria Ely, Amy Hinds
- Recording and mixing: Peter Cobbin (Air Lyndhurst Studios, Hampstead, England), Kirsty Whalley (Sweet Thunder Mix Room, London, England)
- Assistant engineer: Alex Ferguson
- Mastering: John Webber (Air Studios, London)
- Pro tools recordists: Fiona Cruickshank
- Pro tools editing: Lewis Morison
- Pro tools preparation: Victor Chaga
