= Free in the Knowledge =

2022 single by the Smile

Single by the Smile

from the album A Light for Attracting Attention
- Released: 20 April 2022
- Genre: Art rock; psychedelic folk
- Length: 4:12
- Label: XL
- Songwriters: Jonny Greenwood; Nigel Godrich; Thom Yorke; Tom Skinner
- Producer: Nigel Godrich

The Smile singles chronology
"Pana-vision" (2022)	"Free in the Knowledge" (2022)	"Thin Thing" (2022)

Music video
- "Free in the Knowledge" on YouTube

"Free in the Knowledge" is a song by the English rock band the Smile. It was released on 20 March 2022 as the fifth single from the Smile's debut album, A Light for Attracting Attention, by XL Recordings.

The song was first performed by the singer, Thom Yorke, in October 2021 at the Royal Albert Hall. The song was also played on 2 December 2021, on a live Instagram post featuring the band rehearsing new tracks with one of these being "Free in the Knowledge".

== Music video ==
The music video was directed by Leo Leigh and features a ritualistic ceremony in a forest. The video has been described as unsettling and haunting.

== Reception ==
Writing for Consequence, Alex Lake described "Free in the Knowledge" as an "extremely successful attempt at evoking a misty-eyed thousand-yard stare", and praised the band calling them "extremely overqualified". Nathaniel Fitzgerald of Tuned Up wrote that it broke from the album's "hyperactive jazz drums and angular guitar in favour of a delicate acoustic, electric piano, and wash of strings". He described the track as a line between hopeless and romantic. Writing for Beatsperminute.com, Rob H. described the track as an "acoustic dreamer" that features Yorke reflecting on "horrors experienced in modern life", noting the slow buildup of strings and horns from the London Contemporary Orchestra.

== Personnel ==
Credits adapted from album liner notes.

The Smile

- Thom Yorke – vocals, synthesiser, acoustic guitar
- Jonny Greenwood – piano, bass
- Tom Skinner – drums

Production

- Nigel Godrich

Additional musicians

- London Contemporary Orchestra
  - Hugh Brunt – orchestration
  - Eloisa-Fleur Thom – violin
  - Alessandro Ruisi – violin
  - Zara Benyounes – violin
  - Sophie Mather – violin
  - Agata Daraskaite – violin
  - Charlotte Bonneton – violin
  - Zoe Matthews – viola
  - Clifton Harrison – viola
  - Oliver Coates – cello
  - Max Ruisi – cello
  - Clare O’Connell – cello
- Jason Yarde – saxophone
- Robert Stillman – saxophone
- Chelsea Carmichael – flute
- Nathaniel Cross – trombone
- Byron Wallen – trumpet
- Theon Cross – tuba
- Tom Herbert – double bass
- Dave Brown – double bass
