= Wall of Eyes =

Studio album by the Smile
- Released: 26 January 2024
- Studio: Abbey Road
- Genres: Art rock; progressive rock; post-rock; experimental rock
- Length: 45:16
- Label: XL
- Producer: Sam Petts-Davies

The Smile chronology
Europe: Live Recordings 2022 (2023)	Wall of Eyes (2024)	Cutouts (2024)

Singles from Wall of Eyes
- 1. "Bending Hectic" Released: 20 June 2023; 2. "Wall of Eyes" Released: 13 November 2023; 3. "Friend of a Friend" Released: 9 January 2024

Wall of Eyes is the second studio album by the English rock band the Smile, released on 26 January 2024 through XL Recordings. It was recorded in Oxfordshire and Abbey Road Studios, London, with the producer Sam Petts-Davies.

The Smile developed the songs while on tour for their first album, A Light for Attracting Attention (2022). They released the first single, "Bending Hectic", in June 2023, and announced the album in November. "Wall of Eyes" and "Friend of a Friend" were also released as singles, with music videos directed by Paul Thomas Anderson.

Wall of Eyes was named one of the year's best albums by several publications and entered the top ten of several national albums charts. The Smile began a tour of Europe in March 2024. A second album recorded during the same sessions, Cutouts, was released in October.

== Recording ==
The Smile are composed of the Radiohead members Jonny Greenwood and Thom Yorke with the drummer Tom Skinner. While on tour for their first album, A Light for Attracting Attention (2022), they performed many new songs, including several future Wall of Eyes tracks.

While A Light for Attracting Attention was produced by the Radiohead producer, Nigel Godrich, Wall of Eyes was produced and mixed by Sam Petts-Davies. Petts-Davies had previously produced Yorke's 2018 soundtrack Suspiria.

The Smile recorded Wall of Eyes in Greenwood's home studio in Oxfordshire and in Abbey Road Studios, London. Yorke said Abbey Road was the best studio in London, and lamented that it had a "touristy" element because of its association with the Beatles. The strings were performed by the London Contemporary Orchestra.

In March 2023, the Smile confirmed that they were seven weeks into recording. In June, Greenwood said the album was about working within the limits of a three-person band and that they were still working through a backlog of ideas generated during the COVID-19 pandemic.

== Music and lyrics ==
According to BrooklynVegan, Wall of Eyes is more improvisational than A Light For Attracting Attention. Stereogum wrote that it was "less explosive". The opening track, "Wall of Eyes", features strummed acoustic guitar, strings and a samba-like rhythm in 5/4 time. Stereogum described it as "light, lilting, insular" and "soft and graceful, with a growing sense of unease and discordance". "Teleharmonic" combines "celestial vocals, soulful bass, rippling synth, and tumbling drums". "Read the Room" is a "math-rock odyssey" with a motorik drum beat. "Under Our Pillows" culminates in an ambient drone. Stereogum likened the piano song "Friend of a Friend" to the work of Randy Newman and Ben Folds, and likened the strings to the 1967 Beatles song "A Day in the Life". "Bending Hectic" begins with detuned guitar and builds to a crescendo, with lyrics describing a car crash, a familiar subject for Yorke.

The download for the 2009 Radiohead song "These Are My Twisted Words" contained a text file containing the phrase "Wall of Ice", triggering speculation that it was the title of an upcoming Radiohead EP. The phrase "wall of eyes" later appeared in promotional materials for Radiohead's 2011 album The King of Limbs. Responding to suggestions that the Wall of Eyes lyrics indicated that Radiohead had broken up, Greenwood said: "No, we would never write songs about ourselves, like that. There's a lot of history of bands doing it, and it just makes you shiver with embarrassment sometimes when you read those lyrics."

== Release ==
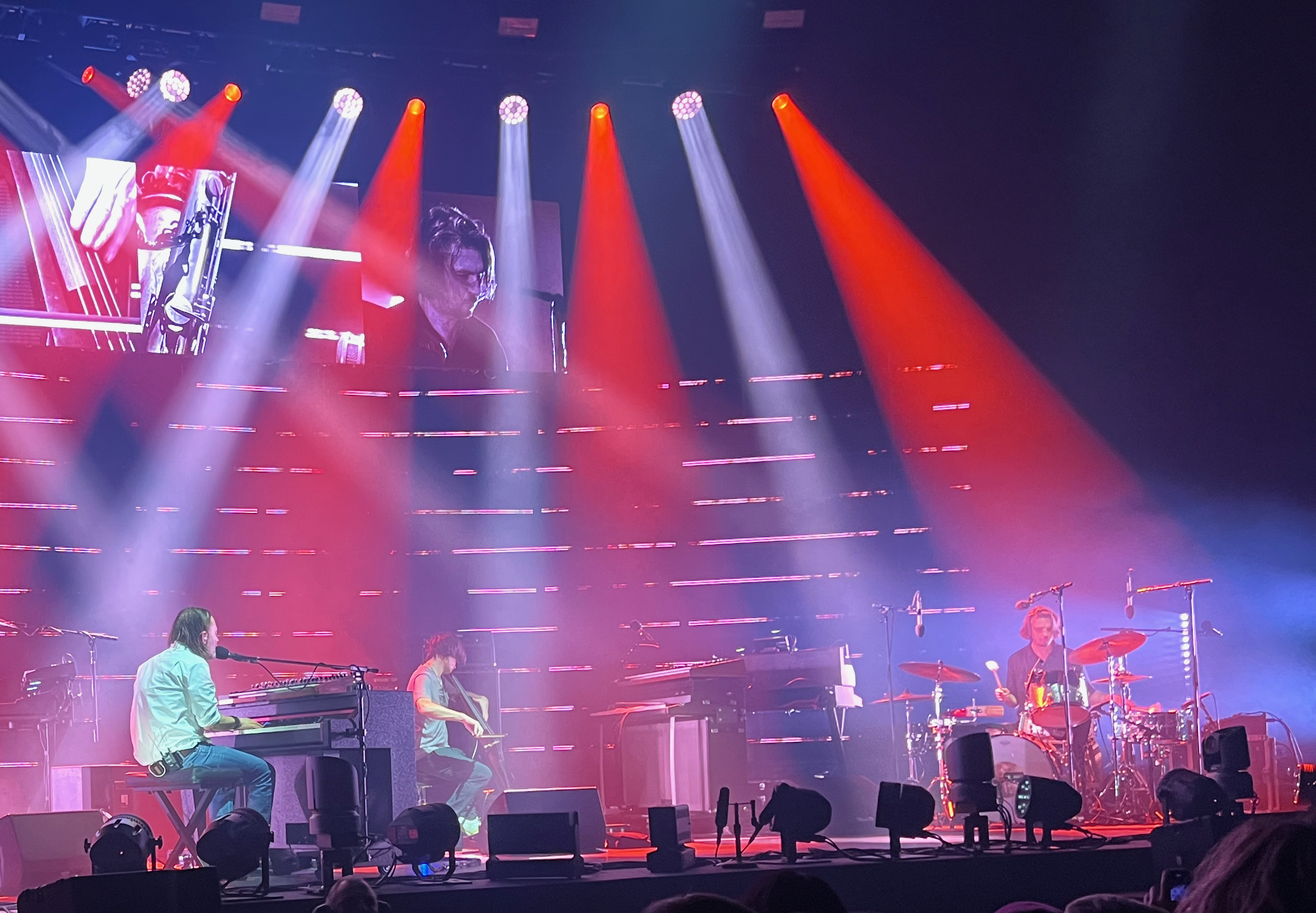
The Smile at the Brighton Centre, March 2024

The Smile contributed a version of "Teleharmonic" to a 2022 episode of the television drama Peaky Blinders. The first Wall of Eyes single, "Bending Hectic", was released on 20 June 2023. Wall of Eyes was announced on 13 November, alongside the second single, "Wall of Eyes". The "Wall of Eyes" music video was directed by Paul Thomas Anderson and filmed at the Mildmay Club in London in October. It has Yorke wandering through London, drinking alone in a pub, staring at a wall of eyeballs and sitting among dozens of versions of himself. The third single, "Friend of a Friend", was released on 9 January 2024.

From 19 January, the Smile held a series of screenings titled Wall of Eyes, on Film at independent cinemas around the world. The events included listening parties in surround sound; footage from the recording sessions; the premiere of Anderson's video for "Friend of a Friend"; and screenings of Anderson's previous videos with the Smile, Yorke and Radiohead. The band members made a surprise appearance at the Prince Charles Cinema in London and answered questions from the audience.

Wall of Eyes was released on 26 January 2024. It was the UK's highest-selling vinyl in the week of its release. The Smile began a European tour in March, including a performance at 6 Music Festival in Manchester with the London Contemporary Orchestra. Their August tour was canceled after Greenwood was temporarily hospitalised with a serious infection. A second album recorded during the Wall of Eyes sessions, Cutouts, was released on October 4.

== Critical reception ==
Professional ratings
Aggregate scores
Source	Rating
AnyDecentMusic?	8.5/10
Metacritic	83/100
Review scores
Source	Rating
AllMusic	4/5 stars
Evening Standard	5/5 stars
Exclaim!	6/10
The Guardian	4/5 stars
The Independent	5/5 stars
The Irish Times	5/5 stars
NME	4/5 stars
Pitchfork	8.5/10
Rolling Stone	4/5 stars
Uncut	9/10

According to the review aggregator Metacritic, Wall of Eyes received "universal acclaim". The Irish Times wrote that it had a "remarkable, sombre majesty" reminiscent of the 2016 Radiohead album A Moon Shaped Pool, and that Yorke and Greenwood had "delivered yet another classic". The Guardian chief music critic, Alexis Petridis, chose it as his album of the week, writing that it was "imaginative and viscerally thrilling, one of the best things Yorke and Greenwood have put their names to in at least a decade".

In Pitchfork, Jazz Monroe named Wall of Eyes the week's "best new music", writing that Yorke and Greenwood sounded more relaxed and had allowed their songwriting to absorb more influences. Consequence picked "Wall of Eyes" as their song of the week, describing it as "dizzyingly danceable and easily enjoyable ... the sound of three boundless musicians with enough ideas to span several lifetimes". In July, BrooklynVegan named Wall of Eyes one of their favourite albums of the year so far, writing: "It's a treat to hear music that doesn't sound so obsessed over from people who just exude talent ... As much as the more moody, ethereal songs sound like Thom Yorke and Jonny Greenwood at their finest, it's even more thrilling to hear the ways Wall of Eyes push them out of their usual comfort zones."

In Stereogum, Chris DeVille wrote that Wall of Eyes "stands out for the way its songs resemble the outgrowth of a living organism rather than compositions pieced together". He described the Smile as a "fun phase" for Yorke and Greenwood, but expressed hope for Radiohead's return and said it demonstrated what the other Radiohead members contribute.

=== Year-end lists ===
Select year-end rankings for Wall of Eyes
Publication/critic	Accolade	Rank	Ref.
Consequence	50 Best Albums of 2024	12	
DIY	Best Albums of 2024	20	
The Independent	The best albums of 2024, ranked	10	
Louder Than War	Top 100 Albums of 2024	10	
Mojo	75 Best Albums of 2024	13	
Mondo Sonoro	Best International Albums of 2024	16	
NME	50 Best Albums of 2024	25	
Oor	20 Best Albums of 2024	14	
BrooklynVegan	80 Best Albums of 2024	7	

== Track listing ==
All tracks are written by Thom Yorke, Jonny Greenwood and Tom Skinner.

Wall of Eyes track listing
No.	Title	Length
1.	"Wall of Eyes"	5:05
2.	"Teleharmonic"	5:10
3.	"Read the Room"	5:14
4.	"Under Our Pillows"	6:14
5.	"Friend of a Friend"	4:35
6.	"I Quit"	5:32
7.	"Bending Hectic"	8:03
8.	"You Know Me!"	5:22
Total length:		45:16

== Personnel ==
Credits adapted from album liner notes.

The Smile

- Jonny Greenwood – guitars, bass, piano, synthesisers, orchestral arrangements, cello, Max MSP
- Tom Skinner – drums, synthesisers, percussion
- Thom Yorke – voice, guitars, bass, piano, synthesisers, lyrics

Production

- Sam Petts-Davies – production, engineering, mixing
- Oli Middleton – engineering
- Tom Bailey – orchestral engineering
- Pete Clements – studio tech
- Joe Wyatt – Abbey Road recording, assistant engineering
- Tom Ashpitel – Abbey Road recording
- Greg Calbi – mastering

Additional musicians

- London Contemporary Orchestra, led by Eloisa-Fleur Thom
  - Hugh Brunt – conducting
  - Robert Stillman – clarinet, saxophone
  - Pete Wareham – flute

== Charts ==
=== Weekly charts ===
Weekly chart performance for Wall of Eyes
Chart (2024)	Peak position
Australian Albums (ARIA)	7
Austrian Albums (Ö3 Austria)	5
Belgian Albums (Ultratop Flanders)	2
Belgian Albums (Ultratop Wallonia)	4
Canadian Albums (Billboard)	42
Croatian International Albums (HDU)	8
Danish Albums (Hitlisten)	2
Dutch Albums (Album Top 100)	1
Finnish Albums (Suomen virallinen lista)	14
French Albums (SNEP)	6
German Albums (Offizielle Top 100)	4
Hungarian Physical Albums (MAHASZ)	9
Irish Albums (Official Charts)	2
Italian Albums (FIMI)	12
Japanese Albums (Oricon)	21
Japanese Digital Albums (Oricon)	18
Japanese Hot Albums (Billboard Japan)	23
New Zealand Albums (RMNZ)	6
Polish Albums (ZPAV)	40
Portuguese Albums (AFP)	2
Scottish Albums (Official Charts)	1
Spanish Albums (Promusicae)	12
Swedish Albums (Sverigetopplistan)	49
Swiss Albums (Schweizer Hitparade)	2
UK Albums (Official Charts)	3
UK Independent Albums (Official Charts)	2
US Billboard 200	42
US Independent Albums (Billboard)	5
US Top Alternative Albums (Billboard)	5
US Top Rock Albums (Billboard)	7

=== Year-end charts ===
Year-end chart performance for Wall of Eyes
Chart (2024)	Position
Belgian Albums (Ultratop Flanders)	190
