= A Light for Attracting Attention =

Studio album by the Smile
- Released: 13 May 2022
- Recorded: 2020–2021
- Studios: Wack Formula London; Air Edel Studio (strings)
- Genres: Art rock; post-punk; progressive rock; electronica
- Length: 53:18
- Label: XL
- Producer: Nigel Godrich

The Smile chronology
A Light for Attracting Attention (2022)	The Smile (Live at Montreux Jazz Festival, July 2022) (2022)

Singles from A Light for Attracting Attention
- 1. "You Will Never Work in Television Again" Released: 5 January 2022; 2. "The Smoke" Released: 27 January 2022; 3. "Skrting on the Surface" Released: 17 March 2022; 4. "Pana-vision" Released: 3 April 2022; 5. "Free in the Knowledge" Released: 20 April 2022; 6. "Thin Thing" Released: 9 May 2022

A Light for Attracting Attention is the debut studio album by the English rock band the Smile. It was released digitally through XL Recordings on 13 May 2022, with a retail release on 17 June.

The Smile comprise the Radiohead members Thom Yorke and Jonny Greenwood with the drummer Tom Skinner. Yorke sang, and he and Greenwood played guitar, bass and keyboards. The album was recorded in London with the Radiohead producer Nigel Godrich. The artwork, inspired by old maps, was created by Yorke with the Radiohead artist Stanley Donwood.

The Smile worked during the COVID-19 lockdowns and made their surprise debut in a performance streamed by Glastonbury Festival in May 2021. They performed to an audience for the first time at three shows in London in January 2022, and began an international tour in May. "You Will Never Work in Television Again", "The Smoke", "Skrting on the Surface", "Pana-vision", "Free in the Knowledge" and "Thin Thing" were released as singles.

A Light for Attracting Attention positive reviews and reached number five on the UK Albums Chart. It was nominated for Record of the Year at the 2023 Libera Awards, and Spin, Uncut and Rough Trade it named it one of the best albums of the year. Performances from the tour were released on The Smile (Live at Montreux Jazz Festival, July 2022) and the EP Europe: Live Recordings 2022.

== Background and recording ==
The Smile comprise the Radiohead members Thom Yorke and Jonny Greenwood with the former Sons of Kemet drummer Tom Skinner. They made their debut in a surprise performance for the concert video Live at Worthy Farm, produced by Glastonbury Festival and streamed on May 22, 2021.

The Smile began working on A Light for Attracting Attention shortly before the first UK COVID-19 lockdowns, with Radiohead's longtime producer, Nigel Godrich. According to Yorke, Greenwood and Skinner "had already tracked about four things before I even knew what was going on". The album was recorded in London at Wack Formula and Air Edel Studios.

Yorke wrote the lyrics in his home during the lockdowns. He recorded his vocals to Godrich's studio from his home using streaming software, before his children returned from school each day. According to Yorke, "It got sort of protracted ... It was deeply frustrating, but it's been the same for everybody." According to Greenwood, the album was almost complete by September 2021.

Yorke first performed "Open the Floodgates" solo in 2009. He first performed "Skrting on the Surface" in 2009, and in a different arrangement in 2012 with Radiohead. In October 2021, Yorke performed "Free in the Knowledge" at the Letters Live event at the Royal Albert Hall, London. In January 2022, the Smile performed to an audience for the first time at three shows at Magazine, London, which were livestreamed.

== Music and lyrics ==
A Light for Attracting Attention incorporates elements of post-punk, post-rock, jazz, progressive rock, math rock, Afrobeat and electronica. In the Guardian, Alexis Petridis likened it to Radiohead, with similar "eerie" electronica, piano ballads and rock. Yorke's lyrics express disgust, paranoia and concern for the environment.

== Artwork ==
The cover art was created by Yorke with the longtime Radiohead collaborator Stanley Donwood. It was inspired by medieval maps made by an Arab pirate, and early maps of the British Isles depicting the locations of springs and rivers. Unlike their previous collaborations, which typically involved digital processing, Yorke and Donwood worked entirely on the canvas, using gouache paint. The pair worked in Yorke's garden shed at his home in Oxford. As the pandemic gave him time to focus on painting, Yorke was more involved than he had been with his previous collaborations with Donwood; he described the time as "eye-opening and deeply therapeutic".

== Release and promotion ==
The Smile's debut single, "You Will Never Work in Television Again", was released to streaming services on 5 January 2022. On 27 January, the Smile released "The Smoke", followed by "Skrting on the Surface" on 17 March. "Pana-vision" was released on 3 April alongside a new song from Yorke, "That's How Horses Are"; both were used in the series finale of the television series Peaky Blinders, broadcast that day. "Free in the Knowledge" was released on 20 April, followed by "Thin Thing" on 9 May. In March, the Smile released a 7-inch vinyl of "You Will Never Work In Television Again" and "The Smoke" through a lottery in independent record stores.

The Smile announced A Light for Attracting Attention on 20 April 2022, alongside the "Free in the Knowledge" single. It was released digitally through XL Recordings on 13 May, with a physical release on 17 June. The Smile began a European tour in May, followed by a North American tour starting in November. They were supported by the saxophonist Robert Stillman, who also joined them for some songs. The tour included performances on The Tonight Show, NPR's Tiny Desk Concerts and KEXP.

In November, the Smile released a special edition of A Light for Attracting Attention through Rough Trade. They also released a limited 10-inch vinyl featuring live tracks and a reading of William Blake's poem "The Smile" by the actor Cillian Murphy, which was used as the introduction for the Smile's live shows. On 14 December, the Smile released a digital-only album, The Smile (Live at Montreux Jazz Festival, July 2022), with songs from their performance at the Montreux Jazz Festival, Switzerland. It was followed on 10 March 2023 by a limited-edition vinyl EP, Europe: Live Recordings 2022.

== Reception ==
Professional ratings
Aggregate scores
Source	Rating
AnyDecentMusic?	8.3/10
Metacritic	86/100
Review scores
Source	Rating
AllMusic	4/5 stars
Clash	9/10
DIY	4/5 stars
Exclaim!	8/10
The Guardian	4/5 stars
The Irish Times	5/5 stars
NME	4/5 stars
Paste	8.3/10
Pitchfork	8.6/10
Rolling Stone	4/5 stars

On Metacritic, A Light for Attracting Attention has a score of 86 out of 100 based on 24 reviews from critics, indicating "universal acclaim". Pitchfork awarded it their "best new music" accolade, with the critic Ryan Dombal writing that it was "instantly, unmistakably the best album yet by a Radiohead side project". In June 2022, Spin named A Light for Attracting Attention the best album of the year so far. The critic Zach Schonfeld wrote that its best moments equalled any of Yorke and Greenwood's work since the 2007 Radiohead album In Rainbows, and that "it almost makes you want to send Radiohead's other three members a sympathy card". In the Guardian, Alexis Petridis named it album of the week, writing that it "may not be head-spinningly different, but is still exceptional".

A Light for Attracting Attention initially reached number 19 on the UK Albums Chart. After its retail release a month later, it reached number five. Uncut named A Light for Attracting Attention the best album of the year. Rough Trade named it the best of the year in their US ranking and the second-best in their UK rating. At the 2023 Libera Awards, it was nominated for Record of the Year.

== Track listing ==
All lyrics are written by Thom Yorke; all music is composed by Thom Yorke, Jonny Greenwood, Tom Skinner and Nigel Godrich.

A Light for Attracting Attention track listing
No.	Title	Length
1.	"The Same"	4:19
2.	"The Opposite"	3:06
3.	"You Will Never Work in Television Again"	2:48
4.	"Pana-vision"	4:08
5.	"The Smoke"	3:39
6.	"Speech Bubbles"	4:16
7.	"Thin Thing"	4:30
8.	"Open the Floodgates"	4:29
9.	"Free in the Knowledge"	4:12
10.	"A Hairdryer"	5:17
11.	"Waving a White Flag"	3:47
12.	"We Don't Know What Tomorrow Brings"	3:16
13.	"Skrting on the Surface"	5:31
Total length:		53:18

== Personnel ==
Credits adapted from album liner notes.

The Smile

- Thom Yorke – vocals (all tracks); synthesiser (tracks 1, 2, 9–12); piano (tracks 1, 4, 8); guitar (tracks 1, 3, 6, 10, 12); bass (tracks 5, 7, 13); vocoder (track 7); sequencer (track 8); acoustic guitar (track 9)
- Jonny Greenwood – synthesiser (tracks 1 and 11); guitar (tracks 1–3, 5, 7, 8, 13); piano (tracks 1, 6, 9); bass (tracks 2–4, 9, 10, 12, 13); keyboards (6); acoustic guitar (track 11); harp (track 6)
- Tom Skinner – drums (tracks 2–7, 9–13); percussion (tracks 2 and 6)

Production

- Nigel Godrich
- Bob Ludwig – mastering

Artwork

- Thom Yorke
- Stanley Donwood

Additional musicians

- London Contemporary Orchestra
  - Hugh Brunt – orchestration
  - Eloisa-Fleur Thom – violin
  - Alessandro Ruisi – violin
  - Zara Benyounes – violin
  - Sophie Mather – violin
  - Agata Daraskaite – violin
  - Charlotte Bonneton – violin
  - Zoe Matthews – viola
  - Clifton Harrison – viola
  - Oliver Coates – cello
  - Max Ruisi – cello
  - Clare O’Connell – cello
- Jason Yarde – saxophone
- Robert Stillman – saxophone
- Chelsea Carmichael – flute
- Nathaniel Cross – trombone
- Byron Wallen – trumpet
- Theon Cross – tuba
- Tom Herbert – double bass
- Dave Brown – double bass

== Charts ==
=== Weekly charts ===
Weekly chart performance for A Light for Attracting Attention
Chart (2022)	Peak position
Australian Albums (ARIA)	15
Austrian Albums (Ö3 Austria)	8
Belgian Albums (Ultratop Flanders)	5
Belgian Albums (Ultratop Wallonia)	3
Canadian Albums (Billboard)	95
Danish Albums (Hitlisten)	11
Dutch Albums (Album Top 100)	3
Finnish Albums (Suomen virallinen lista)	24
French Albums (SNEP)	13
German Albums (Offizielle Top 100)	6
Irish Albums (Official Charts)	11
Italian Albums (FIMI)	24
Japanese Albums (Oricon)	13
Japanese Hot Albums (Billboard Japan)	21
New Zealand Albums (RMNZ)	25
Portuguese Albums (AFP)	4
Scottish Albums (Official Charts)	2
Spanish Albums (Promusicae)	16
Swiss Albums (Schweizer Hitparade)	8
UK Albums (Official Charts)	5
UK Independent Albums (Official Charts)	1
US Billboard 200	19

=== Year-end charts ===
Year-end chart performance for A Light for Attracting Attention
Chart (2022)	Position
Belgian Albums (Ultratop Flanders)	163
