= Bending Hectic =

Single by the Smile

from the album Wall of Eyes
- Released: 20 June 2023
- Studio: Abbey Road Studios
- Genre: Post-rock
- Length: 8:00
- Label: XL
- Songwriters: Jonny Greenwood; Thom Yorke; Tom Skinner
- Producer: Sam Petts-Davies

The Smile singles chronology
| "Thin Thing" (2022) | "Bending Hectic" (2023) | "Wall of Eyes" (2023) |

"Bending Hectic" is a song by the English rock band the Smile, from their second studio album, Wall of Eyes (2024). It was released on 20 June 2023, one day before the Smile began the second leg of their debut North American tour.

== History ==
In 2022, during their first North American tour, the Smile debuted material written while on tour. They first performed "Bending Hectic" at Switzerland's Montreux Jazz Festival in 2022. The singer, Thom Yorke, said he had written the lyrics that day. A video of the full set, including "Bending Hectic", was released for 48 hours to promote the live album The Smile (Live at Montreux Jazz Festival, July 2022).

After completing the first leg of their first North American tour, the Smile began recording new material. "Bending Hectic" was recorded in Abbey Road Studios, with production by Sam Petts-Davies and strings by the London Contemporary Orchestra.

== Composition ==
"Bending Hectic" begins with a detuned guitar and builds to a heavy crescendo. The lyrics describe a car crash, a familiar subject for Yorke.

== Release ==
"Bending Hectic" was released on 20 June 2023, the day before the Smile resumed their North American tour. It was the first single from their second album, Wall of Eyes (2024). An animated video was directed by Sabrina Nichols, with art by Yorke and Stanley Donwood.

== Reception ==
"Bending Hectic" received praise from critics and fans when the Smile first performed it. In Stereogum, Chris DeVille described it as an "epic that starts out soft and quiet and builds into a splendorous stomping beast" and called it among "the best and most ambitious" of the new songs played on their 2022 tour. However, reflecting on Wall of Eyes after its release, DeVille wrote that he did not like the slow build, writing: "The payoff is tremendous, but the journey there becomes a slog." American Songwriter said it would "chill the hearts and minds of fans listening, given its musical nuance and tonal nostalgia". In September 2024, Pitchfork named "Bending Hectic" the 46th-best song of the decade so far.

== Personnel ==
The Smile

- Thom Yorke – vocals, bass
- Jonny Greenwood – guitar, orchestration
- Tom Skinner – drums

Production

- Sam Petts-Davies

Additional musicians

- London Contemporary Orchestra
