= First Testament =

First Testament may refer to:

- Old Testament, in the Bible
- The First Testament, an unreleased Sunz of Man album

== See also ==
- Testament (disambiguation)
