= Testament =

A testament is a document that the author has sworn to be true. In law it usually means last will and testament.

Testament or The Testament can also refer to:

== Literature ==
=== Books ===
- Testament (comic book), a 2005 comic book
- Testament, a thriller novel by David Morrell (writer), 1975
- Testament, a novel by Nino Ricci, 2002
- fr:Le Testament (Maupassant), 1882
- Le Testament (also, Le Grand Testament), a collection of poems by medieval French author François Villon, 1461
- Lenin's Testament, the name given to a document written by Vladimir Lenin 1922-23
- Testament phonographe (Phonograph Testament), poetry book by Léo Ferré, 1980
- The Testament (Grisham novel), 1999
- The Testament (Lustbader novel), a novel by Eric Van Lustbader, completing a novel by Robert Ludlum
- The Testament (Wiesel novel), 1981
- The Testaments (2019), Margaret Atwood's sequel to The Handmaid's Tale (1985)

=== Poems ===
- Testament (Shevchenko), a 1845 poem by Taras Shevchenko

=== Religious ===
- Old Testament, the large, first section of the holy scriptures of Christianity, incorporating the Jewish Scriptures (the Tanakh)
- New Testament, the smaller, final section of the holy scriptures of Christianity including the Gospels, epistles of Paul, and other writings
- Book of Mormon: Another Testament of Jesus Christ, the additional and alternate scriptures of Mormonism
- Testament: the Bible and History, a book by John Romer

== Films and television ==
- Testament, a 1975 Yugoslav film directed by Miloš Radivojević
- Testament (1983 film), a 1983 American film about the aftermath of a nuclear war on a family
- Testament, a 1988 Ghana/UK film by John Akomfrah
- Testament, a 1988 television series based on John Romer's book
- Testament: The Bible in Animation, a 1996 animated series featuring animated versions of stories from the Bible
- Testament (2004 film) (Arabic Ten'ja) French-Moroccan film by Hassan Legzouli with Roschdy Zem and Aure Atika
- The Testament (Testamentet), a 2011 Danish documentary that won the documentary prize at the 65th Bodil Awards
- Testament (2023 film), a Canadian drama film directed by Denys Arcand
- Testament, a 2025 television series by Angel Studios adapting the Acts of the Apostles in modern-day settings
- The Testaments (TV series), a 2026 television series based on the Margaret Atwood novel

== Games ==
- Testament (Guilty Gear), a character from the video game series Guilty Gear
- Testament (video game), a 1996 first-person shooter for the Amiga
- Testament (Xenosaga), characters from the Xenosaga SciFi video game series

== Music ==
=== Artists and labels ===
- Testament (band), an American thrash metal band
- Testament Records (UK), a classical music record label
- Testament Records (United States), an American roots music record label

=== Albums and operas ===
- Testament (album), by All Saints
- Testament, album by The Talleys
- Testament, 2005 album by Toroidh
- The Testament (Cormega album)
- The Testament (Seventh Wonder album), 2022

=== Classical ===
- "Testament", a composition for chamber orchestra by Jonathan Cole
- "Testament", a composition for chamber orchestra by Brett Dean
- "Testament", a French art song by Henri Duparc

=== Songs ===
- "Testament" (song), a 2012 song by Matt Fishel
- "Testament", a song by Axium from the album Blindsided (2003)
- "Le Testament", a song by Léo Ferré from the album L'Été 68 (1969)

== See also ==
- Testimony (disambiguation)
- First Testament (disambiguation)
- The New Testament (disambiguation)
- Final testament (disambiguation)
