= Cutouts =

Studio album by the Smile
- Released: 4 October 2024
- Studio: Abbey Road
- Genres: Experimental rock; art rock; math rock
- Length: 43:54
- Label: XL
- Producer: Sam Petts-Davies

The Smile chronology
Wall of Eyes (2024)	Cutouts (2024)

Singles from Cutouts
- 1. "Don't Get Me Started" / "The Slip" Released: 2 August 2024; 2. "Foreign Spies" / "Zero Sum" Released: 28 August 2024; 3. "Bodies Laughing" Released: 2 October 2024

Cutouts is the third studio album by the English rock band the Smile, released on 4 October 2024 through XL Recordings. It was produced by Sam Petts-Davies and recorded in Oxfordshire and Abbey Road Studios, London, in the same sessions as the previous Smile album, Wall of Eyes (2024).

The Smile promoted Cutouts with the singles "Don't Get Me Started", "The Slip", "Foreign Spies", "Zero Sum" and "Bodies Laughing", music videos by the digital artist Weirdcore, and a series of cryptic messages on social media. It received acclaim and reached number 7 on the UK Albums Chart.

== Recording ==
The Smile comprise the Radiohead members Thom Yorke and Jonny Greenwood with the drummer Tom Skinner. They performed several future Cutouts songs in early live performances in 2021 and 2022.

Cutouts was produced by Sam Petts-Davies and recorded in Greenwood's home studio in Oxfordshire and in Abbey Road Studios, London, in the same sessions as the previous Smile album, Wall of Eyes (2024). Yorke said the Smile split the songs into two albums to do them justice and avoid burnout. Cutouts was half-finished when Wall of Eyes was released, with additional parts recorded while the Smile were on tour. Greenwood stressed that Cutouts did not comprise "leftovers" and was instead "its own record".

Greenwood used a delay pedal extensively for his guitar parts. "Zero Sum" was inspired by footage of Microsoft executives dancing at the Windows 95 launch event. Yorke wrote "Bodies Laughing" more than 20 years previously, but was unable to finish it. After performing it live, the Smile turned it into a "paranoid easy-listening tune". "Tiptoe" was played at global promotional listening parties for Wall of Eyes. Greenwood first performed the riff from "Eyes & Mouth" on Radiohead's 2016 tour during performances of their song "Talk Show Host".

The album title refers to cutouts, an espionage term that Yorke discovered while reading about Russian interference in western politics: "Cutouts are like two-dimensional characters placed to facilitate backdoor connections with an asset ... I think it was the two-dimensional nature of the description I got stuck on. A new Cold War world of two-dimensional proxy characters." He connected this to the "atomisation and isolation from world events" caused by social media, and asked: "Why the fuck would we be online with two-dimensional avatars of each other as if they are really us, and try to engage with complex issues using two or three sentences?"

== Music ==
Critics described Cutouts as experimental rock, art rock and math rock. Slant called it "more challenging" than Wall of Eyes, prioritising atmosphere over conventional songwriting, while Pitchfork said it was "looser" and "funkier". The lyrics address capitalism, climate change denial and sociopolitical dread.

The first track, "Foreign Spies", features "pillowy" synthesisers and reuses elements of Greenwood's classical composition "Horror Vacui". Uproxx described "Don't Get Me Started" as "synth-heavy" and "propulsive". "Zero Sum" is high-tempo and rhythmically busy, with "hyperactive" lead guitar. "Eyes & Mouth" combines "spiralling" riffs with a "rolling" drumbeat and jazzy piano chords. Stereogum described "Colours Fly" as a combination of the Radiohead songs "Pyramid Song" and "The National Anthem", with an Egyptian scale and "clouds of noise". "Instant Psalm" features strings, an "earthy" melody and an acoustic guitar playing a pedal note, which Loud and Quiet likened to Radiohead's 1995 album The Bends. "Tiptoe" is a piano ballad with orchestral strings.

== Release ==
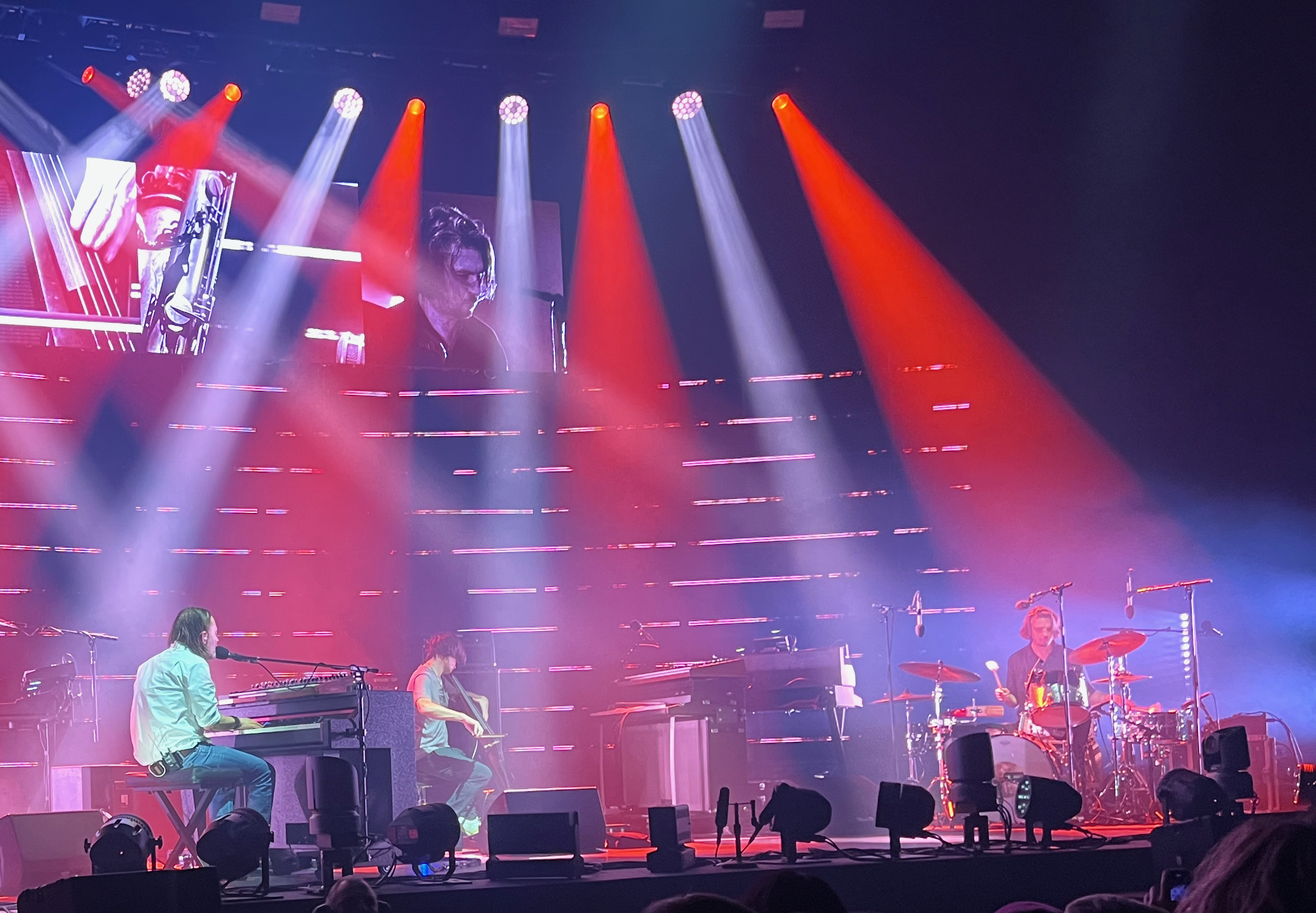
The Smile performing live in March 2024

In March 2024, the Smile began a European tour, including a performance at 6 Music Festival in Manchester with the London Contemporary Orchestra. The shows included performances of some Cutouts songs. An August tour was canceled after Greenwood was temporarily hospitalised with a serious infection.

On 2 August, the Smile released "Don't Get Me Started" and "The Slip" as a double single on vinyl. It was released without promotion and only in stores. "Don't Get Me Started" was added to digital services on 8 August, accompanied by a video directed by the audiovisual artist Weirdcore, with "glitchy" computer graphics reminiscent of generative artificial intelligence.

Later in August, the Smile released the track list in a series of ciphered messages on social media. They announced Cutouts on 28 August, alongside the release of "Foreign Spies" and "Zero Sum" on streaming services, accompanied by more videos by Weirdcore. On October 1, the Smile announced a pair of art installations, Through the Glass, in London and New York City, with new songs and Weirdcore visuals. "Bodies Laughing" was released on 2 October. Cutouts was released on 4 October, in digital, CD, cassette and vinyl formats.

On 19 February 2025, the Smile released a single comprising remixes of "Don't Get Me Started" and "Instant Psalm" on digital services and on 12" vinyl. The remixes were created by James Holden, who supported the Smile on their 2024 tour, and Robert Stillman, who accompanied them during live performances. Weirdcore created new videos for the single.

== Reception ==
Professional ratings
Aggregate scores
Source	Rating
AnyDecentMusic?	7.8/10
Metacritic	82/100
Review scores
Source	Rating
AllMusic	3.5/5 stars
Clash	9/10
Evening Standard	4/5 stars
Exclaim!	6/10
The Guardian	4/5 stars
The Independent	4/5 stars
MusicOMH	5/5 stars
NME	4/5 stars
Pitchfork	8.0/10
Slant Magazine	3.5/5 stars

On Metacritic, Cutouts has a score of 82 out of 100 based on 14 reviews from critics, indicating "universal acclaim". In Stereogum, Chris DeVille praised the "incendiary" uptempo tracks and Greenwood's guitar work, but felt the slower tracks were less effective. He suggested that Radiohead's producer, Nigel Godrich, who produced the first Smile album, was a better match for slower tracks than Petts-Davies' "rawer and drier" production style. He concluded: "It's possible that the Smile could have built one masterpiece out of their pair of 2024 albums, but the two they've given are fascinating and rewarding enough to justify existing as distinct releases." The Clash critic Andy Hill praised the "ecstatic" atmosphere and Petts-Davies' "gleaming" production. In The Guardian, Phil Mongredien wrote that the songs were not immediate but that "repeated listening allows each to reveal its charms".

Slant critic Lewie Parkinson-Jones said Cutouts struck a good balance of styles and better resembled "the work of a proper band" than Yorke's previous side project, Atoms for Peace. He praised "Bodies Laughing" as "strikingly beautiful", with "well-placed key changes and the subtle introductions of new instrumentation". In The Arts Desk, Graham Fuller wrote that Cutouts was "not without beauty and technical brilliance", praising Yorke's "intimate" singing and Greenwood's "dextrous" guitar work. However, he felt it lacked melody and atmosphere, with a "random" track sequencing and abstruse lyrics, and found it less consequential than Wall of Eyes.

The Loud and Quiet critic Sam Walton said that while Cutouts was less cohesive, its songs were "uniformly enthralling, captivating, thrilling and memorable", and suggested it was Yorke and Greenwood's best work since the 2007 Radiohead album In Rainbows. In NME, Jordan Bassett said the Smile "seem to be having more fun than ever" and sounded comfortable with their style. In The AV Club, Ryan Reed described Cutouts as "chaos over continuity ... a lot of fucking fun, an adjective few would use to describe the also-brilliant Wall Of Eyes". Pitchfork described it as a "a thrilling testament to the near-telepathic chemistry these three musicians have honed across two years of touring", and felt the tracks where Skinner is least present, "Foreign Spies" and "Don't Get Me Started", were the only weak points.

=== Year-end lists ===
Select year-end rankings for Cutouts
Publication/critic	Accolade	Rank	Ref.
Rough Trade UK	Albums of the Year 2024	4	

== Track listing ==
All lyrics are written by Thom Yorke; all music is composed by the Smile.

Cutouts track listing
No.	Title	Length
1.	"Foreign Spies"	4:48
2.	"Instant Psalm"	4:18
3.	"Zero Sum"	2:47
4.	"Colours Fly"	4:55
5.	"Eyes & Mouth"	3:59
6.	"Don't Get Me Started"	5:55
7.	"Tiptoe"	3:30
8.	"The Slip"	4:29
9.	"No Words"	4:16
10.	"Bodies Laughing"	4:57
Total length:		43:54

== Personnel ==
The Smile

- Jonny Greenwood – guitars, bass, piano, synthesisers, orchestral arrangements, cello, MaxMSP
- Tom Skinner – drums, synthesisers, percussion, vocals
- Thom Yorke – voice, guitars, bass, piano, synthesisers, artwork, design

Additional contributors

- Sam Petts-Davies – production, mixing, engineering
- Oli Middleton – engineering
- Greg Calbi – mastering
- Tom Ashpitel – orchestral engineering, engineering assistance
- Pete Clements – studio technician
- Joe Wyatt – recording, engineering assistance
- London Contemporary Orchestra – strings on "Instant Psalm" and "Tiptoe"
  - Hugh Brunt – conductor
  - Eloisa-Fleur Thom – leader
- Robert Stillman – tenor saxophone on "Zero Sum", bass clarinet on "Colours Fly"
- Pete Wareham – baritone saxophone on "Zero Sum"
- Stanley Donwood – artwork, design

== Charts ==
=== Weekly charts ===
Chart performance for Cutouts
Chart (2024)	Peak position
Australian Albums (ARIA)	29
Austrian Albums (Ö3 Austria)	7
Belgian Albums (Ultratop Flanders)	7
Belgian Albums (Ultratop Wallonia)	10
Croatian International Albums (HDU)	1
Danish Albums (Hitlisten)	14
Dutch Albums (Album Top 100)	5
German Albums (Offizielle Top 100)	14
Irish Albums (Official Charts)	27
Italian Albums (FIMI)	36
Japanese Albums (Oricon)	29
Japanese Digital Albums (Oricon)	28
Japanese Hot Albums (Billboard Japan)	29
New Zealand Albums (RMNZ)	26
Polish Albums (ZPAV)	67
Portuguese Albums (AFP)	7
Scottish Albums (Official Charts)	4
Spanish Albums (Promusicae)	23
Swedish Physical Albums (Sverigetopplistan)	4
Swiss Albums (Schweizer Hitparade)	5
UK Albums (Official Charts)	7
UK Independent Albums (Official Charts)	2
US Billboard 200	52

=== Year-end charts ===
2024 year-end chart performance for Cutouts
Chart (2024)	Position
Croatian International Albums (HDU)	6

2025 year-end chart performance for Cutouts
Chart (2025)	Position
Croatian International Albums (HDU)	26
