= Testimony (disambiguation) =

Testimony is the statement of a witness in court.

Testimony may also refer to:

== Film and television ==
- Testimony (1920 film), a British silent film by Guy Newall
- The Testimony (1946 film), an Italian crime film
- Testimony (1988 film), Tony Palmer's film about Shostakovich
- The Testimony (2015 film), an American short-documentary film
- Testimony, a 2000–2004 program broadcast by BET
- "Testimony" (Doctors), a 2004 television episode
- "The Testimony" (Dynasty), a 1981 television episode
- "Testimony" (Veep), a 2015 television episode
- Testimony (The Morning Show), an episode of the American television series The Morning Show

== Literature ==
- Testimony (Volkov book), the book about Dmitri Shostakovich by Solomon Volkov
- Testimony (Shreve novel), a 2008 novel by Anita Shreve
- Testimony (Turow novel), a 2017 novel by Scott Turow

== Music ==
=== Albums ===
- Testimony (August Alsina album), 2014
- Testimony (Dana Glover album) or the title song, 2002
- Testimony (Ferron album), 1980
- Testimony (Gloria Gaynor album), 2019
- Testimony (Howard Johnson album), 2017
- Testimony (Neal Morse album), 2003
- Testimony (Stella Parton album), 2008
- Testimony (The Gap Band album) or the title song, 1994
- Testimony (Virtue album) or the title song, 2006
- Testimony (William Parker album), 1996
- Testimony: Vol. 1, Life & Relationship, by India.Arie, 2006

=== Songs ===
- "Testimony" (Kodak Black song), 2018
- "Testimony" (YoungBoy Never Broke Again song), 2023
- "Testimony", by DC Talk from Free at Last, 1992
- "Testimony", by Robbie Robertson from Robbie Robertson, 1987
- "Testimony", by YFN Lucci from Long Live Nut, 2017

== Other uses ==
- The Testimony (magazine), a Bible magazine
- Testimony of peace, action generally taken by members of the Religious Society of Friends (Quakers) for peace and against participation in war

== See also ==
- Testify (disambiguation)
