= A New Testament =

A New Testament may refer to:

- A New Testament (Christopher Owens album), 2014
- A New Testament, a series of drawings by Giovanni Domenico Tiepolo
- A New Testament, a 1927 poetry collection by Sherwood Anderson

== See also ==
- New Testament
- The New Testament (disambiguation)
