= Final testament =

Final Testament may refer to:

- Will and testament, a legal document for allocating property after one's death
- The Final Testament, British title of 2011 novel The Final Testament of the Holy Bible
- Another name for the Quran
  - Quran: The final testament, an edition of the Quran edited by Rashad Khalifa
- The Final Testament, a villainous professional wrestling stable in WWE

== See also ==
- The New Testament (disambiguation)
- Testament (disambiguation)
