= The New Testament (disambiguation) =

The New Testament is the second division of the Christian biblical canon.

The New Testament may also refer to:

- The New Testament (film), a 1936 French comedy directed by Sacha Guitry
- The New Testament (The Truth), a 2004 album by Suga Free
- The New Testament, a 2014 book by Jericho Brown

== See also ==
- A New Testament (disambiguation)
- Nuovo Testamento, an Italian-American band
- Final testament (disambiguation)
- Testament (disambiguation)
- Hebrew Bible (disambiguation)
