= Thin Thing (song) =

2022 single by the Smile

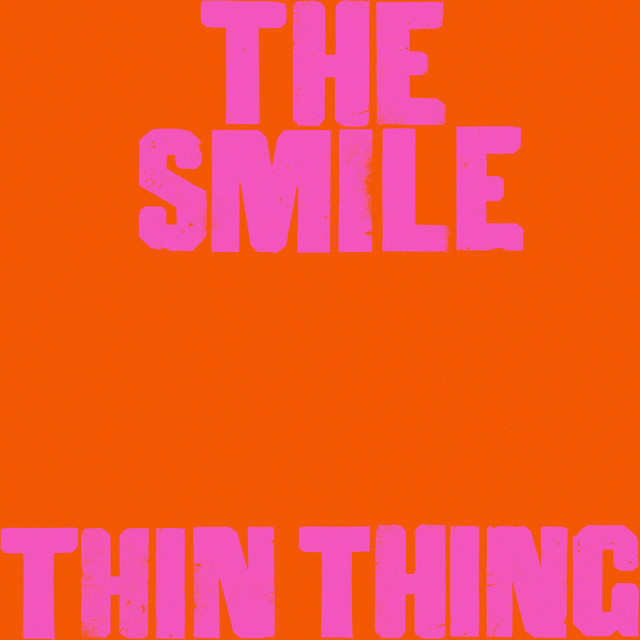

Single by the Smile

from the album A Light for Attracting Attention
- Released: 9 May 2022
- Genre: Art rock; math rock
- Length: 4:30
- Label: XL
- Songwriters: Jonny Greenwood; Nigel Godrich; Thom Yorke; Tom Skinner
- Producer: Nigel Godrich

The Smile singles chronology
"Free in the Knowledge" (2022)	"Thin Thing" (2022)	"Bending Hectic" (2023)

Music video
- "Thin Thing" on YouTube

"Thin Thing" is a song by English rock band The Smile. It is the seventh song and sixth single on their first album A Light for Attracting Attention, and was released on 9 May 2022.

== Music video ==
The track is accompanied by a stop-motion animation video directed by Cristobal Leon and Joaquín Cocina. The video took six months to complete. It features vintage technology being destroyed by an unseen force, severed arms crawling across the ground and the disembodied heads of Thom Yorke, Jonny Greenwood and Tom Skinner doubling as the tops of barren trees.

The directors of the video stated "Hearing the song for the first time, we imagined a frenetic fluid that carries machines, pieces of human bodies and carnivorous plants," León and Cociña write. "When presenting the idea to the band, Thom told us about a dream that made him write the song. We believe the video is the conjunction of these two things."

== Reception ==
Abby Jones of Consequence wrote "To put it in Radioheadish language: 'Thin Thing' calls to mind the sprawling, entrancing art-rock of their Kid A or Hail to the Thief eras, building upon restless percussion in a barely-detectable time signature. As are most good Yorke songs, the lyrics to 'Thin Thing' are equally anxious and amorphous: 'First she'll pull your fingers off/And then she'll pull your toes/ And then she'll steal the photos from your phone', he sings, as the rhythm section gradually builds into a jazzy climax."

== Personnel ==
Credits adapted from album liner notes.

- Thom Yorke – bass, vocals, vocoder
- Jonny Greenwood – guitar
- Tom Skinner – drums

Production

- Nigel Godrich

Additional musicians

- London Contemporary Orchestra
