= Errollyn Wallen =

British composer (born 1958)

Errollyn Wallen CBE
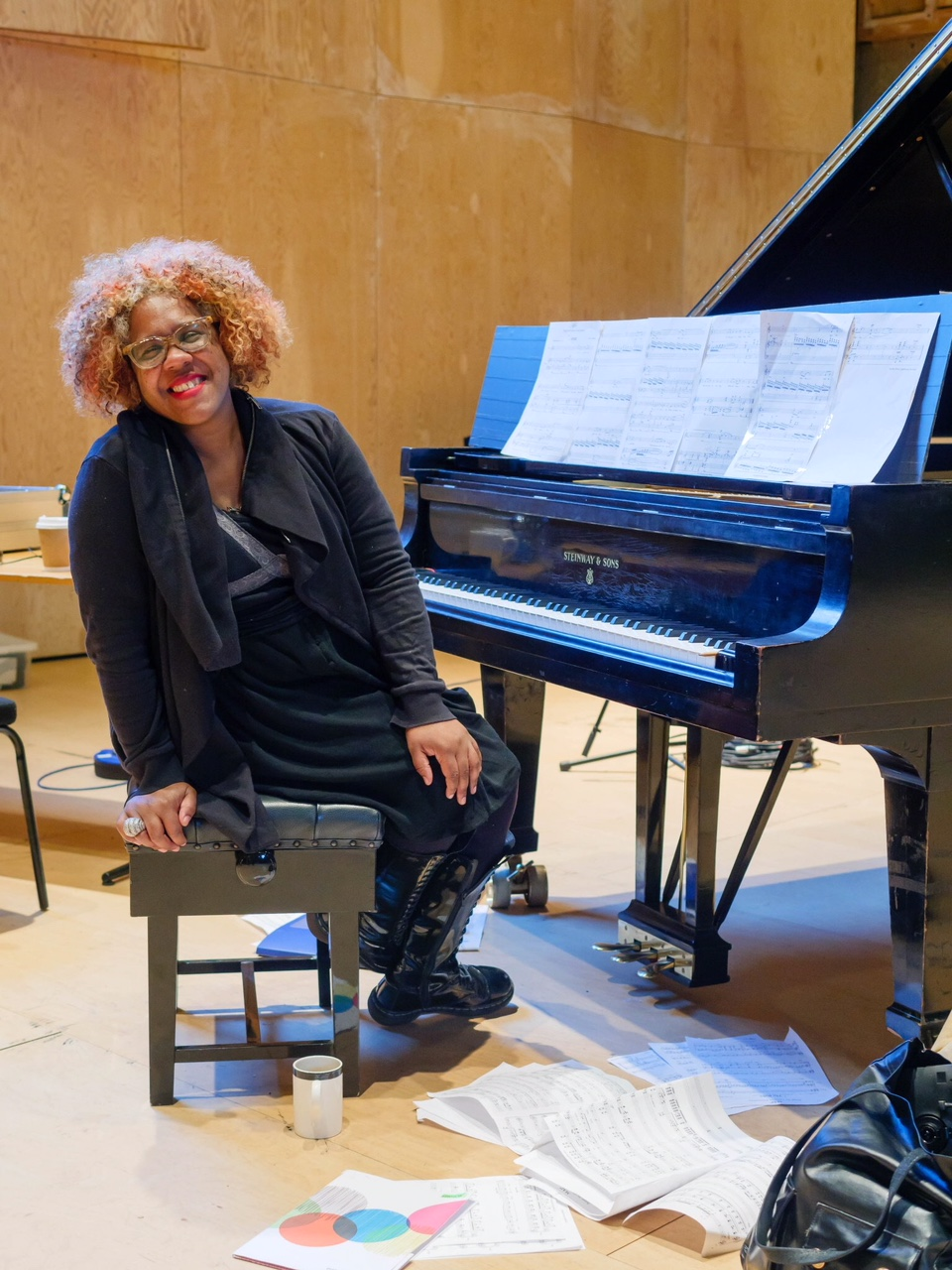
- Wallen at Snape Maltings
- Born: 10 April 1958 (age 68); Belize
- Education: Goldsmiths, University of London; King's College London; King's College, Cambridge
- Years active: 1976–present errollynwallen.com
- Relatives: Byron Wallen (brother)

22nd Master of the King's Music
- Incumbent
- Assumed office 22 July 2024
- Monarch: Charles III
- Preceded by: Judith Weir
- Website: errollynwallen.com

Errollyn Wallen CBE (born 10 April 1958) is a Belize-born British composer and musician, who moved as a child with her family to London, England.

Wallen was appointed Master of the King's Music in 2024 by King Charles III, in his first appointment to the post. She is the first Black person to serve in the position, having in 1998 been the first Black woman to have a work featured in the Proms.

== Life ==
Errollyn Wallen moved to London, England, from Belize with her family when she was two years old. While her parents moved to New York in the United States, she and her three siblings (one of whom is the trumpeter Byron Wallen) were brought up by an aunt and uncle and she was educated at a boarding school. She credits her interest in poetry and music to her uncle, whom she described in an interview as "Victorian" and responsible for her taking lessons in piano.

Before studying music, she trained as a dancer at the Maureen Lyons School of Dance and the Urdang Academy, both in London. She moved to New York City to train further at the Dance Theatre of Harlem (1976–78) but later abandoned her training, turned to music composition and returned to the United Kingdom. She studied music at Goldsmiths' College (1981) and composition at King's College London (1983), and earned an MPhil degree at King's College, Cambridge. Wallen has stated that she had begun composing professionally before her studies at Cambridge.

Her memoir Becoming a Composer was published in November 2023. Leah Broad concluded in a review by saying: "Becoming A Composer is a generous, warm-hearted book that all aspiring musicians should read. Her message that very real difficulties can be best faced with kindness, consideration, and collaboration feels important at the present moment, giving a blueprint for an optimistic future for classical music. ‘I am glad that I eventually gave myself the permission to do this thing’, she writes, ‘there is endless treasure if we can but dare to walk the path that opens up for each of us."

Wallen is currently serving as Master of the King's Music, the first Black woman to serve in that position, appointed in 2024 by King Charles III in his first appointment to the role. She lives in Orkney.

== Compositions ==
Wallen's music draws on a wide range of influences, including avant-garde classical music, as well as popular songwriting. Her work has been performed in leading concert halls and theatres around the world.

Her first orchestral commission was a concerto for percussion and orchestra, written for percussionist Colin Currie and premiered by him during the finals of the BBC Young Musician competition in 1994. This piece was subsequently performed at the 1998 BBC Proms, making Wallen the first Black female composer to receive a performance at that festival.

Her compositions include the "multi-media song cycle" Jordan Town (2001), Dervish for cello and piano (2001), La Luga for guitar quintet (2002), the opera Another America: Earth (2003), and All the Blues I See for flute and string quartet (2004).

In 2006, she co-wrote a song with the astronaut Steve MacLean while he was aboard the space shuttle STS-115.

In 2007, Gewandhaus Orchestra and the Leipzig Ballet performed Wallen's work The Tempest, with choreography by James McMenemy. Her opera The Silent Twins, with a libretto by April De Angelis, was first performed by the Almeida Opera in 2007.

In June 2008, Wallen had a world premiere of Carbon 12- A Choral Symphony with the Welsh National Opera.

In 2010, her piano quintet Music for Tigers was performed at the Museum of Modern Art in New York City as part of the Summergarden concert series.

In 2012, her song "Daedalus" from the album Errollyn served as the opening and closing theme for the BBC drama One Night, and her "Principia", which has lyrics about science, was featured in the London 2012 Paralympics Opening Ceremony.

In 2014, Melodia Women's Choir of New York City commissioned and performed the World Premiere of Full Fathom Five.

In 2017, her work, Mighty River, which marks the bicentenary of the Abolition of the Slave Trade Act in England, was performed at the Southbank New Music Biennial.

The premiere of her Piano Concerto, which was commissioned by Julian Lloyd-Webber, then outgoing principal of the Royal Birmingham Conservatoire, was planned for June 2020, but was postponed due to the COVID-19 pandemic. The work was ultimately first performed on 4 November 2022 by the Royal Birmingham Conservatoire's Symphony Orchestra conducted by Michael Seal, at the conservatoire's Bradshaw Hall, with soloist Rebeca Omordia.

Wallen's choral work REIGN, for organ and high voices, was commissioned by the WOW Foundation for the 2025 Women of the World Festival. It was premiered on International Women's Day 2025 at the Royal Albert Hall.

Her orchestral work The Elements, commissioned by BBC, was premiered at the first night of the 2025 BBC Proms. While the piece itself got mixed reviews from critics, Barry Millington of The Evening Standard considered its placement in the programme immediately prior to the performance of Vaughan Williams’ solemn choral work Sancta Civitas to be an unfortunate mismatch.

== Recordings and publication ==
In 2004, Wallen recorded an album of her own songs and solo piano music, entitled Errollyn. Her CDs include: The Girl In My Alphabet, Meet Me at Harold Moores, featured on the Brodsky Quartet Mood Swings alongside Björk, Sting and Elvis Costello.

Wallen's music is published by Peters Edition.

== Awards and recognition ==
Wallen was appointed Member of the Order of the British Empire (MBE) in the 2007 Birthday Honours, and Commander of the Order of the British Empire (CBE) in the 2020 New Year Honours, both for services to music. She has also received an Ivor Novello Award, making her the first woman to receive an Ivor Novello Award for classical music.

In 2018, she was listed as one of BBC's 100 Women.

Wallen was the recipient of the 2020 Incorporated Society of Musicians Distinguished Musician Award.

On 3 January 2022, Wallen was chosen by presenter Donald Macleod to be BBC Radio 3's Composer of the Week. In July 2024, Wallen featured on BBC Radio 4's Desert Island Discs; she chose the second movement of Bach's "Double Violin Concerto", performed by Isaac Stern and Itzhak Perlman with the New York Philharmonic conducted by Zubin Mehta as her favourite track, a collection of Bach sheet music as her favourite book, and Wigmore Hall as her luxury item.

Wallen was inducted into Fellowship of The Ivors Academy on 12 November 2024 at The Ivors Classical Awards, the organisation's annual presentation of Ivor Novello Awards celebrating classical composition.

== Academic appointments ==
In October 2020, Wallen was appointed visiting professor of composition at the Royal Conservatoire of Scotland in Glasgow. Wallen is a professor of composition at the Trinity Laban Conservatoire of Music and Dance.

Court offices
Preceded by Judith Weir	Master of the King's Music; 2024–present	Incumbent
