= Jonathan Cole (composer) =

Jonathan Cole (born 21 December 1970 in Welwyn Garden City) is a British composer and Head of Composition at the Royal College of Music.

== Biography ==
Jonathan Cole attended Christ's Hospital school before studying composition at King's College London, the Guildhall School of Music and Drama and Royal Holloway, University of London where he graduated with a PhD in 2001. His teachers included Simon Bainbridge, Simon Holt and Malcolm Williamson. His work first achieved public notice with Ouroboros I (1999). He has enjoyed a fruitful relationship with the London Sinfonietta who have premiered three pieces and has received commissions from the BBC, Nash Ensemble, RAI Orchestra, Turin and the London Symphony Orchestra amongst others. His music has been widely performed in festivals across the world and has been supported by such figures as Oliver Knussen, George Benjamin and Mark Anthony Turnage. Influenced as much by the sounds of London and free-improvisation as by such figures as Stockhausen, Cage and Nono, his music explores perception and memory in rich and imaginative ways. From 2009–2013 he was composer-in-association with the London Contemporary Orchestra and in 2012 he was instrumental in setting up the re:sound collective. Jonathan Cole is well known as a teacher of composition having taught at the Royal College of Music since 2005 where he was appointed Head of Composition in 2022. Prior to this, he taught at King's College, London and the Purcell School.

== Key Dates ==
- 1999 – awarded the Royal Philharmonic Composition Prize
- 2001 – signed exclusive publishing contract with G.Ricordi & co., London
- 2006 – appointed professor of composition at the Royal College of Music
- 2008 – appointed composer-in-association with the London Contemporary Orchestra
- 2018 – awarded fellowship of the Royal College of Music (FRCM)
- 2022 - appointed Head of Composition at the Royal College of Music

== Selected works ==
- Caught (1998)
- Ouroboros II (2000)
- Assassin Hair (2002)
- Penumbra (2004)
- Testament (2005)
- Scrawling Out (2006)
- Simulacrum (2008)
- Tss-K-Haa (2008)
- Burburbabbar Za (2009)
- Ash Relics (2010)
- Nadanu (2012)
- Menhir (2013)
- Anuras (2014)
- 50 Florentine Breaths (2017)
- 13 Verses (2017)
- A Passing Moment (2019)
- Templum (2019)
- Hidden Corners (2020)
- Lucier Clock (2022)

== Selected Recordings ==
- Caught – NMC D076
- Testament – SINF CD1 2007
- tss-k-haa – NMC D150
- 50 Florentine Breaths – EMA Vinci contemporanea 700121 1CD
