= Testify (disambiguation) =

To testify, in law or religion, is to provide testimony, a solemn attestation of truth.

Testify may also refer to:

== Albums ==
- Testify (Caleb Johnson album) or the title song, 2014
- Testify (Dynamic Praise album) or the title song, 2007
- Testify (M People album) or the title song (see below), 1999
- Testify (P.O.D. album), 2006
- Testify (Phil Collins album) or the title song, 2002
- Testify! (album), by Jon Stevens, 2011
- The Simpsons: Testify, a compilation from The Simpsons TV series, or the title song, 2007

== EPs ==
- Testify (The Damned EP) or the title song, 1997
- Testify (The Knocks EP), 2017

== Films and television ==
- Testify TV series, 2024

== Songs ==
- "Testify" (Common song), 2005
- "Testify" (Isley Brothers song), 1964
- "Testify" (M People song), 1998
- "Testify" (Parliament song), 1974
- "Testify" (Rage Against the Machine song), 1999
- "Testify!" (song), by Hifi Sean, 2016
- "(I Wanna) Testify", by the Parliaments, 1967
- "Testify", by 6lack from Since I Have a Lover, 2023
- "Testify", by August Alsina from Testimony, 2014
- "Testify", by Ben Haenow from Ben Haenow, 2015
- "Testify", by Conrad Sewell from Life, 2019
- "Testify", by Future from Hndrxx, 2017
- "Testify", by Meat Loaf from Couldn't Have Said It Better, 2003
- "Testify", by Melissa Etheridge from Brave and Crazy, 1989
- "Testify", by Nas from Untitled Nas album, 2008
- "Testify", by Needtobreathe from Hard Love, 2016
- "Testify", by Nick Jonas from Last Year Was Complicated, 2016
- "Testify", by Stevie Ray Vaughan and Double Trouble from Texas Flood, 1983
