= Robert Ames (conductor) =

British conductor and violist

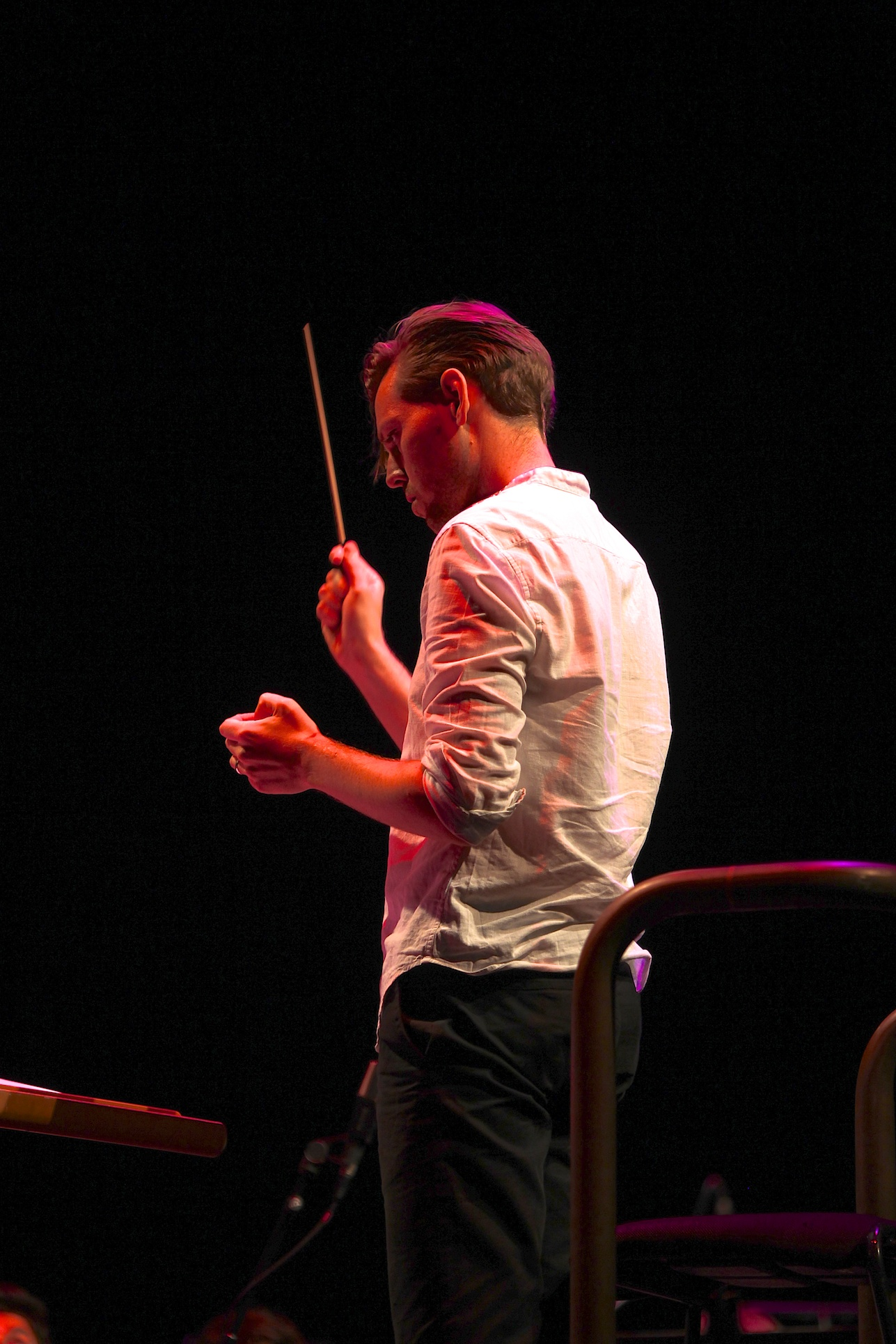
- Ames conducts the London Contemporary Orchestra in 2015
- Born: 8 October 1985 (age 41); Kettering, England
- Occupations: Conductor & Composer
- Years active: 2008–present

Robert Ames (born 8 October 1985) is a British composer, conductor and violist. He co-founded the London Contemporary Orchestra in 2008 and was its co-artistic director and co-principal conductor until 2026.

== Career ==
Born in Kettering, Northamptonshire, he studied at the Royal Academy of Music. While at University, Robert met Hugh Brunt, with whom he founded the London Contemporary Orchestra in 2008. He was made an Associate of the Royal Academy of Music in 2016. In September 2016 he was announced as the co-principal conductor of the London Contemporary Orchestra where he conducted across an eclectic range of venues from Oval Space in East London through to Barbican Centreand Sydney Opera House.

He has released two albums on Modern Recordings, his solo album “Change Ringing” and “CARBS” with Ben Corrigan.

Ames regularly works at Abbey Road Studios, the National Theatre and film studio projects such as All Quiet On The Western Front (conducting for Oscar winner Volker Bertelmann), Jonny Greenwood’s score for Phantom Thread, John Maclean's Slow West (Sundance Film Festival Award), Macbeth, Conclave and Theeb (BAFTA winning and Oscar nominated).

In 2024 he was commissioned to score his first feature film, Atropia, directed by Hailey Gates.

Ames has collaborated with a wide range of artists including Taylor Swift, The Weeknd, Sigur Rós, Oneohtrix Point Never, Hildur Gudnadottir, Frank Ocean, Imogen Heap, Ron Arad, Belle and Sebastian, Vivienne Westwood, DJ Shadow, Nala Sinephro, Jonny Greenwood, Radiohead and Foals. In 2022, he conducted the first video game prom at the BBC Proms. In 2026 he conducted the prog rock prom at the BBC Proms.
