= The Smile (band) =

English rock band

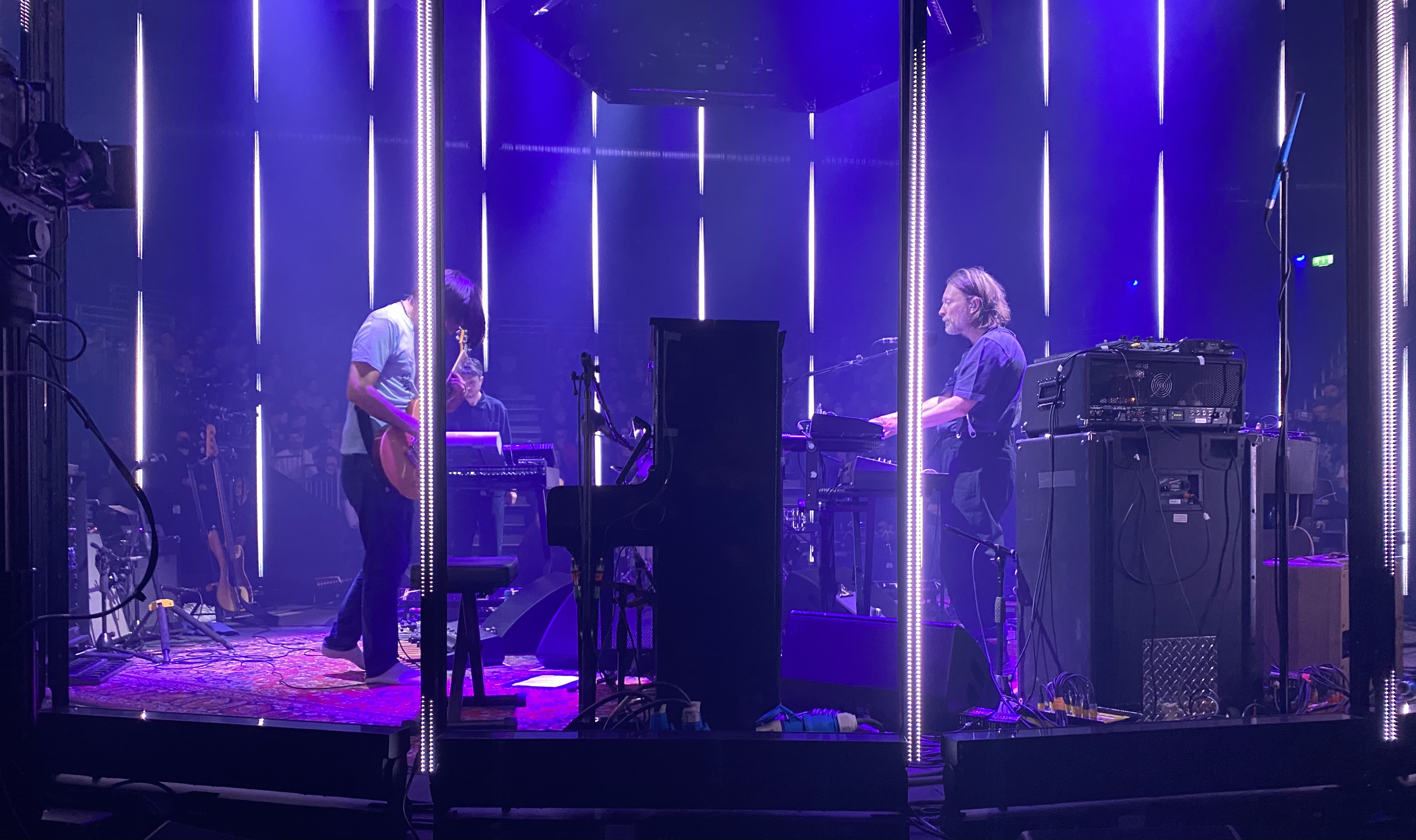
- The Smile in January 2022

Background information
- Genres: Art rock; post-punk
- Years active: 2018–present
- Label: XL
- Spinoff of: Radiohead; Sons of Kemet
- Members: Thom Yorke; Jonny Greenwood; Tom Skinner
- Website: thesmiletheband.com

The Smile are an English rock band comprising Thom Yorke (vocals, guitar, bass, keys), Jonny Greenwood (guitar, bass, keys) and Tom Skinner (drums). Critics likened them to Yorke and Greenwood's band Radiohead, with more jazz, krautrock and progressive rock influences and a looser, wilder sound.

The Smile formed in 2018 and worked during the COVID-19 lockdowns in 2020 and 2021. They made their surprise debut in a performance streamed by Glastonbury Festival in May 2021. In early 2022, they released six singles and performed three shows in London, which were livestreamed. In May, the Smile released their debut album, A Light for Attracting Attention, to acclaim. It was produced by Nigel Godrich, Radiohead's long-time producer.

The Smile toured Europe and North America in 2022 and 2023, and released the live records The Smile (Live at Montreux Jazz Festival, July 2022) and Europe: Live Recordings 2022. Their second studio album, Wall of Eyes, produced by Sam Petts-Davies, was released in January 2024, followed by a European tour. Their third album, Cutouts, recorded during the same sessions as Wall of Eyes, was released in October 2024.

== History ==
=== Formation (2018–2020) ===
The Radiohead guitarist Jonny Greenwood and the Sons of Kemet drummer Tom Skinner first worked together on Greenwood's soundtrack for the 2012 film The Master. In 2018, Greenwood asked Skinner to join him for a session to try some ideas. A few months later, they invited the Radiohead singer, Thom Yorke. The members agreed not to give interviews about the project. Radiohead's drummer, Philip Selway, said it was healthy for the Radiohead members to explore different projects and "see what these other musical voices can do with your ideas".

The Smile's first record was produced by Nigel Godrich, Radiohead's longtime producer. Godrich said the project emerged from Greenwood "writing all these riffs, waiting for something to happen" during the COVID-19 lockdown. He cited the pandemic and the unavailability of the Radiohead guitarist Ed O'Brien, who was busy with his debut solo album, Earth (2020), as motivating factors. Pitchfork attributed the Smile to Greenwood's frustration with Radiohead's slow working pace and his desire to release records that are "90 percent as good [that] come out twice as often". Greenwood said: "We didn't have much time, but we just wanted to finish some songs together. It's been very stop-start, but it's felt a happy way to make music."

The Smile take their name from the title of a poem by Ted Hughes. Yorke said it was "not the smile as in 'ahh', more the smile as in the guy who lies to you every day".

=== First performances (2021–2022) ===
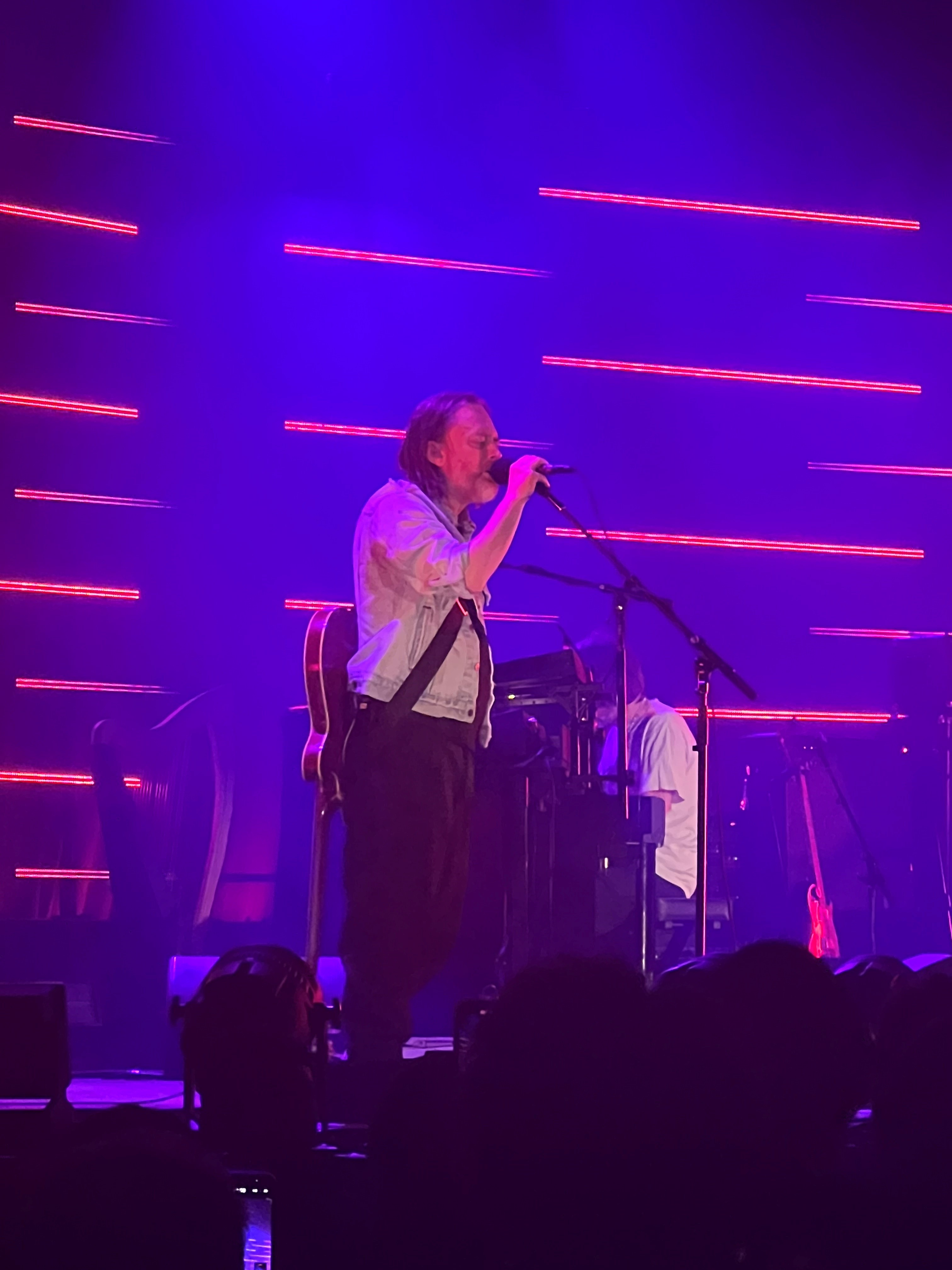
The Smile at the Factory in Deep Ellum, Dallas, December 2022

The Smile made their debut in a surprise performance for the concert video Live at Worthy Farm, produced by Glastonbury Festival and streamed on May 22, 2021. The performance was recorded in secret earlier that week and announced on the day of the stream. The band performed eight songs, with Yorke and Greenwood on guitar, bass, Moog synthesiser and Rhodes piano. That October, Yorke performed a Smile song, "Free in the Knowledge", at the Letters Live event at the Royal Albert Hall, London.

In January 2022, the Smile performed in public for the first time at three shows at Magazine London, which were livestreamed. They played in the round, and debuted several tracks, including "Speech Bubbles", "A Hairdryer", "Waving a White Flag" and "The Same". The shows also included performances of "Open the Floodgates", which Yorke first performed in 2010, and a cover of the 1979 Joe Jackson single "It's Different for Girls".

In NME, James Balmont gave the London show four out of five, describing it as "meticulous, captivating stuff". In the Guardian, Kitty Empire gave it four out of five, writing that "the Smile are most musically convincing when they stretch farther away from Radiohead", while Alexis Petridis gave it three, saying it was "intriguing rather than dazzling, intermittently spellbinding, filled with fascinating ideas that don't always coalesce".

=== A Light for Attracting Attention (2022) ===
On 20 April 2022, the Smile announced their debut album, A Light for Attracting Attention. It was released digitally through XL Recordings on 13 May, followed by a retail release on 17 June, and reached number five on the UK Albums Chart. It received acclaim. The Pitchfork critic Ryan Dombal wrote that it was "instantly, unmistakably the best album yet by a Radiohead side project". The first single, "You Will Never Work in Television Again", was released on streaming platforms on 5 January 2022. It was followed by "The Smoke", "Skrting on the Surface", "Pana-vision", "Free in the Knowledge" and "Thin Thing".

On 16 May 2022, the Smile began a tour of Europe and North America. They were joined for some songs by the saxophonist Robert Stillman. The tour included performances of Yorke's 2009 single "FeelingPulledApartByHorses" and new material. A second North American tour began in mid-2023, including the Smile's first show in Mexico City and a headlining slot at Pitchfork Music Festival in Chicago. On 14 December 2022, the Smile released The Smile (Live at Montreux Jazz Festival, July 2022), with songs from their performance at the Montreux Jazz Festival in Switzerland. On 10 March 2023, they released a limited-edition vinyl EP, Europe: Live Recordings 2022.

=== Wall of Eyes (2023–2024) ===
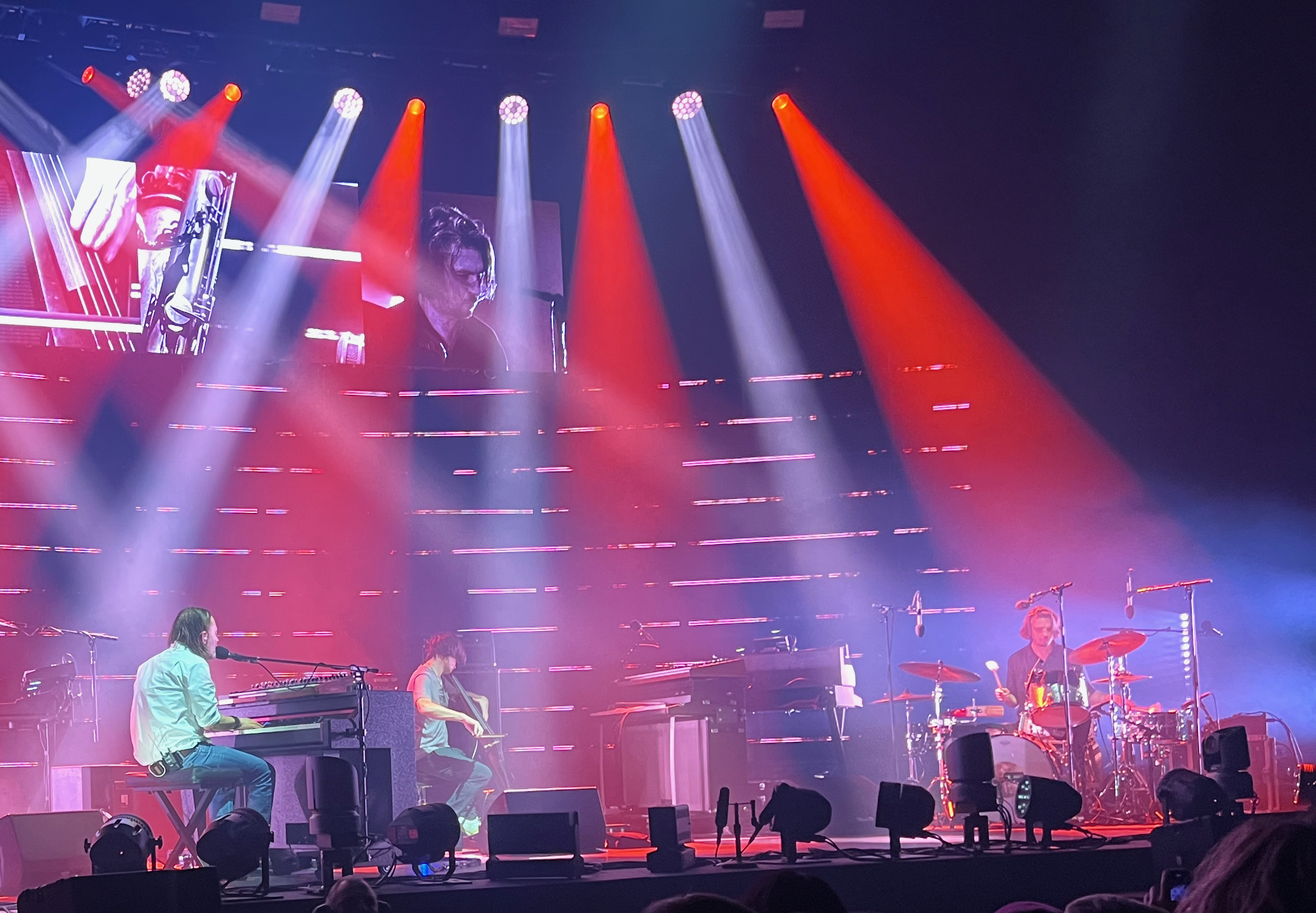
The Smile at Brighton Centre, March 2024

In March 2023, the Smile confirmed that they were seven weeks into recording their second album. On 20 June, they released the first single, "Bending Hectic". In September and December, Yorke and Stanley Donwood exhibited a selection of artwork created for the Smile, The Crow Flies, in London.

The Smile released their second album, Wall of Eyes, produced by Sam Petts-Davies, on 26 January 2024. It was promoted with the singles "Wall of Eyes" and "Friend of a Friend", accompanied by music videos directed by Paul Thomas Anderson. On 19 January, the Smile held a series of screenings at independent cinemas, including listening parties for the album and a selection of Yorke and Greenwood's videos with Anderson. The band members made a surprise appearance at the Prince Charles Cinema in London and answered questions from the audience.

In March, the Smile began a European tour, including a performance at 6 Music Festival in Manchester with the London Contemporary Orchestra. The shows included performances of several new songs. The August leg of the Smile's European tour was canceled after Greenwood was temporarily hospitalised with a serious infection. In April, Yorke released a film soundtrack, Confidenza, featuring contributions from Skinner and Stillman.

=== Cutouts (2024) ===
On 4 October 2024, the Smile released their third album, Cutouts, recorded during the same sessions as Wall of Eyes. It was promoted with the singles "Don't Get Me Started", "The Slip", "Foreign Spies", "Zero Sum" and "Bodies Laughing", music videos by the digital artist Weirdcore, and cryptic messages on social media. Yorke said the Smile were "on a pause" while Greenwood recovered.

In December, the Smile released a 12" vinyl record of three live tracks, Live at the BBC 6 Music Festival 2024, sold exclusively through the London record shop Rough Trade. On 19 February 2025, they released remixes of "Don't Get Me Started" and "Instant Psalm" by James Holden and Stillman. That November, Greenwood and Yorke reunited with Radiohead for their European tour. Skinner contributed to the album Ranjha by Greenwood, Shye Ben Tzur and the Rajasthan Express, released in May 2026.

== Style ==
The Smile incorporate elements of post-punk, proto-punk and math rock. The critic Kitty Empire noted Afrobeat elements in "Eyes & Mouth" and influence from 1960s electronic music and systems music in "Open the Floodgates" and "The Same". On several songs, Greenwood uses a delay effect to create "angular" synchronised repeats. Yorke collaborated with the Radiohead cover artist, Stanley Donwood, to create artwork for the Smile.

Critics likened the Smile to Yorke and Greenwood's band Radiohead; both acts use "warped" melodies, unusual time signatures and "vintage rock" sensibilities. The Guardian critic Alexis Petridis said the Smile sounded "simultaneously more skeletal and knottier" than Radiohead, with progressive rock influences, complex riffs and "hard-driving" motorik psychedelia. Pitchfork identified a "bounce" in Skinner's drumming and "unfamiliar aggression" in Greenwood's basslines. The Pitchfork writer Jazz Monroe said the Smile were "stranger and wilder" than Radiohead, with greater emphasis on jazz, progressive rock and krautrock, while the Stereogum writer Chris DeVille found them "jazzier" and "jammier". The Uncut critic Wyndham Wallace described the Smile as "less a spinoff than regeneration, like a new Doctor Who, emerging from the same gene pool with equal gravitas".

Several critics interpreted the Smile as a liberating project for Yorke and Greenwood, with less pressure than Radiohead. Yorke said he did not "feel the need to live up to anything ... I think we've earned the right to do what makes sense to us without having to explain ourselves or be answerable to anyone else's historical idea of what we should be doing." According to DeVille, whereas Radiohead assemble albums into "powerful coherent statements", Smile albums resemble "a compendium of whatever they've been working on lately". The Smile work more quickly than Radiohead, which Greenwood attributed to the smaller team compared to the resources required for Radiohead albums.

== Members ==
- Jonny Greenwood – guitar, bass, keyboards, piano, harp, cello
- Tom Skinner – drums, percussion, keyboards, backing vocals
- Thom Yorke – vocals, bass, guitar, keyboards, piano

Touring members

- Robert Stillman – saxophone, clarinet, bass clarinet, keyboards, percussion

== Discography ==
=== Studio albums ===
| Title | Details | Peak chart positions | | | | | | | | | | |
| Title | Details | UK | AUS | BEL (FL) | GER | IRE | NLD | NZ | POR | SCO | SWI | US |
|---|---|---|---|---|---|---|---|---|---|---|---|---|
| A Light for Attracting Attention | Released: 13 May 2022; Label: XL, Self Help Tapes; Formats: LP, CD, download, streaming | 5 | 15 | 5 | 6 | 11 | 3 | 32 | 4 | 2 | 8 | 19 |
| Wall of Eyes | Released: 26 January 2024; Label: XL, Self Help Tapes; Formats: LP, CD, download, streaming | 3 | 7 | 2 | 4 | 2 | 1 | 6 | 2 | 1 | 2 | 42 |
| Cutouts | Released: 4 October 2024; Label: XL, Self Help Tapes; Formats: LP, CD, download, streaming | 7 | 29 | 7 | 14 | 27 | 5 | 26 | 7 | 4 | 5 | 52 |

=== Live recordings ===
| Title | Details | Peak chart positions | | | |
| Title | Details | UK Sales | UK Indie | SCO | US Sales |
|---|---|---|---|---|---|
| The Smile (Live at Montreux Jazz Festival, July 2022) | Released: 14 December 2022; Formats: CD, download, streaming; Label: XL | — (Note: The Smile (Live at Montreux Jazz Festival, July 2022) did not enter the UK Albums Chart, but peaked at number 36 on the UK Album Downloads Chart.) | — | — | — |
| Europe: Live Recordings 2022 | Released: 10 March 2023; Format: LP, CD; Label: XL | 9 | 5 | 9 | 57 |
| The Smile Live at the BBC 6 Music Festival 2024 | Released 3 December 2024; Format LP; Label: XL | — | — | — | — |

=== Singles ===
| Title | Year | Peak chart positions | | Album |
| Title | Year | UK Sales | JPN Over. | Album |
|---|---|---|---|---|
| "You Will Never Work in Television Again" | 2022 | — | 19 | A Light for Attracting Attention |
| "The Smoke" | 2022 | 60 | — | A Light for Attracting Attention |
| "Skrting on the Surface" | 2022 | — | — | A Light for Attracting Attention |
| "Pana-vision" | 2022 | 33 | — | A Light for Attracting Attention |
| "Free in the Knowledge" | 2022 | — | — | A Light for Attracting Attention |
| "Thin Thing" | 2022 | — | — | A Light for Attracting Attention |
| "Bending Hectic" | 2023 | 33 | — | Wall of Eyes |
| "Wall of Eyes" | 2023 | — | — | Wall of Eyes |
| "Friend of a Friend" | 2024 | — | — | Wall of Eyes |
| "Don't Get Me Started" / "The Slip" | 2024 | 24 | — | Cutouts |
| "Foreign Spies" / "Zero Sum" | 2024 | — | — | Cutouts |
| "Bodies Laughing" | 2024 | — | — | Cutouts |
"—" denotes a recording that did not chart or was not released in that territory.

=== Other charting songs ===
| Title | Year | Peak chart positions | Album |
| Title | Year | UK Sales | Album |
|---|---|---|---|
| "Open the Floodgates" | 2022 | 25 | A Light for Attracting Attention |

== Music videos ==
List of music videos
| Title | Year | Director(s) |
|---|---|---|
| "You Will Never Work In Television Again" | 2022 | Duncan Loudon |
| "The Smoke" | 2022 | Mark Jenkin |
| "Skrting On The Surface" | 2022 | Mark Jenkin |
| "Free in the Knowledge" | 2022 | Leo Leigh |
| "Thin Thing" | 2022 | Cristóbal León & Joaquín Cociña |
| "Pana-vision" | 2022 | Anthony Byrne |
| "Wall Of Eyes" | 2023 | Paul Thomas Anderson |
| "Friend Of A Friend" | 2024 | Paul Thomas Anderson |
| "Don't Get Me Started" | 2024 | Weirdcore |
| "Zero Sum" | 2024 | Weirdcore |
| "Foreign Spies" | 2024 | Weirdcore |
| "Instant Psalm" | 2024 | Weirdcore |

== Awards and nominations ==
| Award | Year | Category | Nominated work | Result | Ref. |
|---|---|---|---|---|---|
| Libera Awards | 2023 | Record of the Year | A Light for Attracting Attention | Nominated | |
| UK Music Video Awards | 2024 | Best Alternative Video – UK | "Wall of Eyes" | Nominated | |
