= The Smoke (song) =

2022 single by the Smile

Single by the Smile

from the album A Light for Attracting Attention
- A-side: "You Will Never Work in Television Again" (double A-side 7" single)
- Released: 27 January 2022
- Genre: Progressive rock; funk; art rock
- Length: 3:39
- Label: XL
- Songwriters: Jonny Greenwood; Nigel Godrich; Thom Yorke; Tom Skinner
- Producer: Nigel Godrich

The Smile singles chronology
"You Will Never Work in Television Again" (2022)	"The Smoke" (2022)	"Skrting on the Surface" (2022)

Music video
- "The Smoke" on YouTube

"The Smoke" is a song by the English rock band the Smile. It was released on 27 January 2022 as the second single from their debut album, A Light for Attracting Attention.

== Music video ==
The video for "The Smoke" was shot on 16 mm film and directed by Mark Jenkin. Rob Ulitski of Promonews said it "doesn't conform to traditional narrative or promo logic, existing instead as a conceptual form to accompany the music". Raphael Helfand of The Fader called the video "a loose interpretation" of a lyric video with "largely unintelligible" words.

== Release ==
"The Smoke" was released on 27 January 2022 as the second single from the Smile's debut album, A Light for Attracting Attention. A remix by the reggae musician Dennis Bovell was released on 3 March. Greenwood said Bovell's work "runs like a thread through so much of the music I love", and was proud he had remixed "The Smoke".

== Reception ==
Uproxx and The Fader said "The Smoke" was closer to the later work of Thom Yorke and Jonny Greenwood's main band, Radiohead, than the Smile's previous single, "You Will Never Work in Television Again". Earmilk likened it to a demo by the Doors or Dizzy Gillespie from the early 1970s, while Resident Advisor likened it to Fela Kuti. Uncrate said Tom Skinner's drumming showcased funk and jazz influences.

== Personnel ==
Credits adapted from album liner notes.

The Smile

- Thom Yorke – vocals, bass
- Jonny Greenwood – guitar
- Tom Skinner – drums

Production

- Nigel Godrich
