= Byron Wallen =

British jazz trumpeter, composer and educator (born 1969)

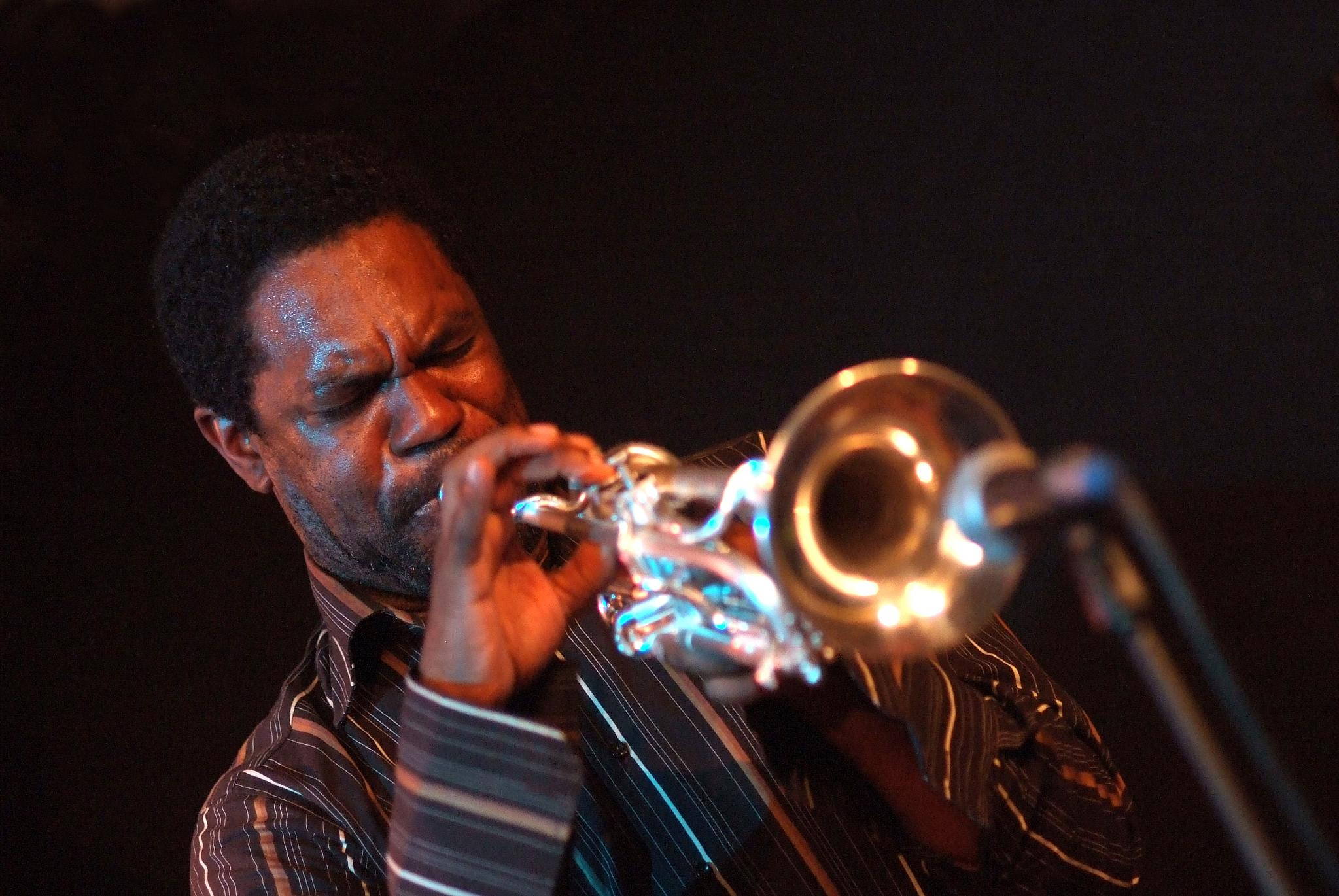

Background information
- Born: July 1969 (age 57); London, England
- Education: Sussex University
- Genres: Jazz
- Occupations: Musician, composer and educator
- Instrument: Trumpet
- Labels: FMR Records, M.E.L.T. 2000, Twilight Jaguar
- Formerly of: Tomorrow's Warriors
- Website: byronwallen.co.uk
- Relatives: Errollyn Wallen (sister)

Byron Wallen (born July 1969) is a British jazz trumpeter, composer and educator. He was described by Jazzwise as "one of the most innovative, exciting and original trumpet players alive". As characterised by All About Jazz, "He does not fit into any pigeonhole, however, and is also something of a renaissance man: he has long been involved in cognitive psychology and also travels widely, spending extended periods in South Africa, Uganda, Zimbabwe, Nigeria, Morocco, Indonesia and Belize (his parents' homeland)."

== Biography ==
Wallen was born in London, England, to parents from Belize, and was brought up in a musical family – one of his three siblings is composer Errollyn Wallen. After beginning to learn classical piano as a young child, also playing euphonium, he went on to study the trumpet in New York in the mid- to late 1980s with Jimmy Owens, Donald Byrd and Jon Faddis.

Wallen graduated from Sussex University with a degree in Psychology, Philosophy and Maths, while developing his music career, recording with Loose Ends and Cleveland Watkiss, and playing trumpet with The Style Council, Charles Earland, Courtney Pine and Jean Toussaint, among others. He is also among the alumni of jazz music education and artist development organisation Tomorrow's Warriors. Other artists with whom he would later perform include David Murray, Andrew Hill, Butch Morris, Billy Higgins, Hugh Masekela, Manu Dibango, Eddie Henderson, Wynton Marsalis, George Benson, William Orbit, Toumani Diabaté, Ronnie Laws, Chaka Khan and Grand Union Orchestra.

Forming his own band Sound Advice in 1992, Wallen released his debut album in 1995, which has been followed by five further albums.

As a composer Wallen has had commissions from such organisations as London's Science Museum, the BBC, Jerwood Foundation, Southbank Centre, National Theatre, Arts Council England, FIFA and Sage Gateshead.

In 2018, Wallen joined the staff of Trinity Laban Conservatoire of Music and Dance.

== Awards and recognition ==
In 2003, Wallen received a BBC Jazz Award in the Jazz Innovation category.

His 2007 album, Meeting Ground, was nominated for Best Band and Best Album in the 2007 BBC Jazz Awards and Best Jazz Act in the 2007 MOBO Awards.

In 2017, Wallen received a Paul Hamlyn Award.

== Discography ==
- 1995: Sound Advice
- 1997: Bambaraka - Automatic Original
- 1997: Earth Roots
- 2002: Indigo
- 2007: Meeting Ground
- 2020: Portrait: Reflections On Belonging
