= You Will Never Work in Television Again =

2022 single by the Smile

Single by the Smile

from the album A Light for Attracting Attention
- A-side: "The Smoke" (double A-side 7" single)
- Released: 5 January 2022
- Genre: Post-punk; garage rock
- Length: 2:48
- Label: XL
- Songwriters: Jonny Greenwood; Nigel Godrich; Thom Yorke; Tom Skinner
- Producer: Nigel Godrich

The Smile singles chronology
"You Will Never Work in Television Again" (2022)	"The Smoke" (2022)

Music video
- "You Will Never Work in Television Again" on YouTube

"You Will Never Work in Television Again" is a song by the English rock band the Smile. It was released on 5 January 2022 as the debut single from their debut album, A Light for Attracting Attention. The Smile first performed it in the 2021 Glastonbury livestream Live at Worthy Farm.

== Reception ==
Some publications compared "You Will Never Work in Television Again" favourably to Thom Yorke and Jonny Greenwood's main band Radiohead. The NPR writer Brian Burns likened it to the post-punk acts Mission of Burma and Swell Maps, while the Guitar World writer Jackson Maxwell compared it to Sonic Youth.

== Music video ==
The band released a lyric video alongside the single directed by Duncan Loudon.

== Personnel ==
Credits adapted from album liner notes.

The Smile

- Thom Yorke – vocals, guitar
- Jonny Greenwood – guitar, bass
- Tom Skinner – drums

Production

- Nigel Godrich

== See also ==
- "Bunga bunga", a phrase used in the song, with links to ex-Italian Prime Minister Silvio Berlusconi's prostitution trial.
