= Hugh Tieppo-Brunt =

British conductor

Hugh Tieppo-Brunt is a British conductor, and works with Robert Ames as the Co-Artistic Director and the Co-Principal Conductor of the London Contemporary Orchestra.

== Career ==
Brunt was a chorister at St George's Chapel, Windsor Castle, and a music scholar at Radley College before attending New College, Oxford, where he was a scholar. He co-founded the London Contemporary Orchestra in 2008, along with conductor and violist Robert Ames. Brunt conducted Jonny Greenwood’s soundtrack to Paul Thomas Anderson’s 2012 film The Master and Phantom Thread (2017), Jed Kurzel’s soundtrack to Justin Kurzel’s 2015 film Macbeth, and the string and choir arrangements on Radiohead's 2016 album A Moon Shaped Pool. He has also collaborated as an arranger and/or conductor with artists including Foals, Imogen Heap, Actress, Beck, and The Smile.

== Recent work ==
- Thunderbolts* (2025) – conductor of the London Contemporary Orchestra
- Hamnet (2025) – conductor for Max Richter's score
- Non Fiction (2025) – conductor for Hania Rani, with Manchester Collective
- One Battle After Another (2025) – conductor of the London Contemporary Orchestra for Jonny Greenwood's score
