= London Contemporary Orchestra =

English modern orchestra

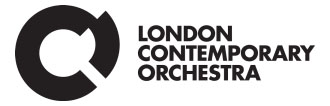
- Short name: LCO
- Founded: 2008
- Principal conductor: Robert Ames and Hugh Brunt
- Website: www.lcorchestra.co.uk

The London Contemporary Orchestra (LCO), founded in 2008 by Hugh Brunt and Robert Ames, is an ensemble of young musicians whose stated aim is "to explore and promote new music to an increasingly wide audience". LCO staged its inaugural season at LSO St. Luke's and has since performed at venues and festivals both in the UK and internationally, including the Roundhouse, Latitude Festival, The Old Vic Tunnels, Snape Maltings, Southbank Centre, Barbican, Spitalfield's Music, Royal Opera House, Yota Space, and Unsound Festival. LCO has since provided its work on films including Theeb, Moonlight, Macbeth, Slow West, The Master, The Two Popes and American Animals.

In 2010, the LCO was shortlisted for the Royal Philharmonic Society Music Awards (Audience Development category), and in 2015, LCO was the winner of the Ensemble Category at the Royal Philharmonic Society Music Awards.

In January 2022, LCO performed a continuous 24-hour long concert at the Barbican Centre.

== Overview ==
LCO's inaugural 2008 season featured music by Mark-Anthony Turnage, Kaija Saariaho, Thomas Adès, Iannis Xenakis, Simon Holt, Roberto Carnevale, Olivier Messiaen, Radiohead's Jonny Greenwood, and new works by young composers Emily Hall, Colin Alexander and Jonathan Cole. In May 2009 the LCO collaborated with experimental electronic duo Matmos and composer Anna Meredith for a series of performances at Shoreditch warehouse Village Underground.

In January 2010, LCO appeared at the Roundhouse as part of contemporary music festival 'Reverb', performing works by Steve Reich, John Cage, Biosphere and the world premiere of Shiva Feshareki's turntable concerto "TTKonzert". LCO made its debut at the Spitalfields Music Summer Festival in June 2010 and at Aldeburgh Music's 'Faster Than Sound' in May 2010. In October 2010, the Roundhouse staged three screenings of Metropolis (restored version), with Gottfried Huppertz's original score performed live by the LCO. Later that year, the LCO gave a performance of Frank Zappa's "The Yellow Shark" as part of the Roundhouse's 'Frank Zappa – 70th Birthday Celebration'.

In 2011, LCO returned to the Roundhouse to collaborate with Ron Arad on 'Curtain Call'. LCO staged its first 'LCO Soloists' project at The Old Vic Tunnels in May 2011. In March 2012, the LCO performed works by Xenakis, Gabriel Prokofiev, Jonny Greenwood and Vivier to a capacity audience of 1,200 as part of 'Reverb 2012' at the Roundhouse. LCO made its Southbank Centre debut in 2012 closing Meltdown Festival (curated by Antony Hegarty) with a performance of William Basinski's "The Disintegration Loops".

In 2013, LCO performed in the abandoned Aldwych underground station, 350 ft underground, Claude Vivier's Glaubst du an die Unsterblichkeit der Seele ('Do You Believe in the Immortality of the Soul?'). LCO was the winner of the Ensemble category in 2015 at the Royal Philharmonic Society Music Awards.

In 2018, London Contemporary Orchestra featured in Thom Yorke's first feature film score, Suspiria. Suspiria was nominated for Best Song Written for Visual Media at the 62nd Annual Grammy Awards. In 2019 LCO collaborated with composer Jed Kurzel on a number of film projects including The Mustang, Seberg and in 2020 on True History of The Kelly Gang.

In January 2022, it performed 24, a continuous 24-hour long concert at the Barbican Centre. This included performances from electronic musicians KMRU, Actress, and Powell, plus works by John Cage, Éliane Radigue, Mica Levi, Alvin Lucier, Michael Gordon and James Tenney. Morton Feldman's String Quartet No 2 was also performed. Visuals were designed by projection mapping artist László Zsolt Bordos.

== Organisation ==
The artistic director role is shared between Robert Ames and Hugh Brunt. They also share the role of principal conductor.

== Collaborations ==
The LCO performed with headliners Belle & Sebastian at Latitude Festival in July 2010 and rejoined the band for their UK tour in December 2010. The concerts reprised many of the arrangements first performed by Belle & Sebastian and the Los Angeles Philharmonic at the Hollywood Bowl in 2006. In June 2010, members from the LCO joined Mercury Prize-nominated band Foals at Glastonbury Festival for a BBC Radio 6 Music live session. LCO appear on the band's single "Spanish Sahara" (radio edit).

LCO has worked with artists, composers and brands including Secret Cinema, Actress, Vivienne Westwood, Arcade Fire, Goldfrapp, Nike, William Basinski, Biosphere, Mira Calix, Mara Carlyle, Mike Figgis, Simon Fisher Turner, Foals, Jonny Greenwood, Laurel Halo, Loraine James, Matmos, Jimmy Page, Jed Kurzel, Frank Ocean, Coby Sey, Taylor Swift and United Visual Artists.

LCO strings and choir feature prominently on Radiohead's 2016 Mercury-nominated album A Moon Shaped Pool. On November 19, 2019, LCO's collaboration with Bastille for the 2019 John Lewis Christmas advert was released.

== LCO X Spitfire Audio ==
In 2017, LCO collaborated with Spitfire Audio to create London Contemporary Orchestra Strings, a string sample library made up of 42,094 samples. The sample set was recorded in a tight room with sections of six violins, four violas, three cellos and two double basses. In 2019, for a second time LCO collaborated with Spitfire Audio to create London Contemporary Orchestra Textures. The sample library recorded in an aircraft hangar features four grouped instrument ensembles, each comprising 12 individual textures.

== Awards ==
In 2010, the LCO was shortlisted for the Royal Philharmonic Society Music Awards (Audience Development category), and in 2015 LCO was the winner of the Ensemble category at the Royal Philharmonic Society Music Awards.

== Filmography ==
Film	Director	Release date	Awards
The Master	Paul Thomas Anderson	21 September 2012	Chicago Film Critics Association Awards – Best Original Score
Theeb	Naji Abu Nowar	19 March 2015	BAFTA – Outstanding Debut by a British Writer, Director or Producer; Academy Award nominated – Best Foreign Language Film of the Year
Slow West	John Maclean	16 April 2015	Sundance Film Festival – World Cinema (Dramatic); Screen Music Awards – Feature Film Score of the Year
Rattle the Cage	Majid Al Ansari	10 December 2015	
Macbeth	Justin Kurzel	11 December 2015	Cannes Film Festival nominated – Palme d'Or
Radiohead: "Daydreaming" (Video Short)	Paul Thomas Anderson	6 May 2016	MTV Video Music Awards Japan nominated – Best Rock Video
The White King	Alex Helfrecht, Jörg Tittel	18 June 2016	Michael Powell Award nominated – Best British Feature Film; Edinburgh International Film Festival nominated – Best Performance in a British Feature Film
"The Dead Sea" (Short)	Stuart Gatt	3 December 2016	
Assassin's Creed	Justin Kurzel	14 December 2016	Golden Trailer Awards – Golden Fleece TV Spot; Golden Trailer Awards nominated – Best Original Score TV Spot
Alien: Covenant	Ridley Scott	4 May 2017	Academy of Science Fiction, Fantasy & Horror Films nominated – Best Science Film Award; Fright Meter Awards nominated – Best Special Effects
You Were Never Really Here	Lynne Ramsay	27 May 2017	Cannes Film Festival – Best Actor; Best Screenplay
The Ritual	David Bruckner	13 October 2017	
Phantom Thread	Paul Thomas Anderson	25 December 2017	Academy Award, BAFTA and Golden Globe nominated
American Animals	Bart Layton	19 January 2018	British Independent Film Awards – Debut Screenwriter and Best Editing
What They Had	Elizabeth Chomko	2 May 2018	
Calibre	Matt Palmer	22 June 2018	Bafta Scotland Awards winner and British Independent Film Award Nominee
Three Identical Strangers	Tim Wardle	29 June 2018	Primetime Emmy and BAFTA award nominated – Best Documentary
Suspiria	Luca Guadagnino	2 November 2018	
Untouchable	Ursula Macfarlane	25 January 2019	
Captive State	Rupert Wyatt	28 March 2019	
Tell It To The Bees	Annabel Jankel	2 May 2019	
The Mustang	Laure de Clermont-Tonnerre	19 June 2019	Sundance Film Festival – NHK award
Dirt Music	Gregor Jordan	11 September 2019	Australian Academy of Cinema and Television Arts (AACTA) Awards nominated – Best Original Score
Our Friend	Gabriela Cowperthwaite	7 October 2019	
Overlord	Julius Avery	3 November 2019	Awards: Saturn Award nominee – Best Horror Film and Best Make-Up
The Cave	Feras Fayyad	18 October 2019	Academy Award nominee – Best Documentary Feature
Seberg	Benedict Andrews	13 December 2019	
The Two Popes	Fernando Meyrelles	29 November 2019	Academy Awards, Golden Globe Awards, British Academy Film Awards and Critics' Choice Movie Awards nominated
Dream Horse	Euros Lyn	24 January 2020	
Sulphur and White	Julian Jarrold	27 February 2020	
True History Of The Kelly Gang	Justin Kurzel	28 February 2020	Australian Academy of Cinema and Television Arts (AACTA) Awards – Best Original Score
Lost Girls	Liz Garbus	9 March 2020	
The Forgotten Battle	Matthijs van Heijningen Jr.	14 December 2020	
Cyrano	Joe Wright	25 February 2021	
Encounter	Michael Pearce	10 December 2021	
Conclave	Edward Berger	25 October 2024	
One Battle After Another	Paul Thomas Anderson	26 September 2025	
Bugonia	Yorgos Lanthimos	24 October 2025	
Clayface	James Watkins	23 October 2026	

== Discography ==
Foals: "Spanish Sahara" with London Contemporary Orchestra
Release Date: 12 September 2010
Label: Warner Music UK Limited

Jonny Greenwood: The Master (Original Motion Picture Soundtrack)
Release Date: 10 September 2012
Label: Nonesuch Records Inc.

Foals: Holy Fire feat. London Contemporary Orchestra
Release Date: 11 February 2013
Label: Transgressive

Jed Kurzel: Slow West (Original Motion Picture Soundtrack)
Release Date: 12 May 2015
Label: Sony Classical Records

Jerry Lane: Theeb (Original Motion Picture Soundtrack) with London Contemporary Orchestra
Release Date: 7 August 2015
Label: Al Dakheel, Inc.

Jed Kurzel: Macbeth (Original Motion Picture Soundtrack)
Release Date: 1 October 2015
Label: Decca Records

Radiohead: A Moon Shaped Pool
Release Date: 8 May 2016
Label: XL Recordings
Most tracks on this album feature the orchestra and choir performing arrangements by Jonny Greenwood

Frank Ocean: Endless feat. London Contemporary Orchestra
Release Date: 19 August 2016
Label: Def Jam Recordings

Frank Ocean: Blonde feat. London Contemporary Orchestra
Release Date: 20 August 2016
Label: Boys Don't Cry

Justice: Woman feat. London Contemporary Orchestra
Release Date: 18 November 2016
Label: Ed Banger Records

Alien: Covenant (Original Motion Picture Soundtrack) by Jed Kurzel
Release Date: 19 May 2017
Label: Milan Records

Actress X LCO: Audio Track 5
Release Date: 1 September 2017
Label: Ninja Tune

Phantom Thread (Original Motion Picture Soundtrack) by Jonny Greenwood
Release Date: 12 January 2018
Label: Nonesuch

Actress X LCO: Lageos
Release Date: 25 May 2018
Label: Ninja Tune

American Animals (Original Motion Picture Soundtrack) by Anne Nikitin
Release Date: 22 June 2018
Label: The Orchard

Captive State (Original Motion Picture Soundtrack) by Rob Simonsen
Release Date: 15 March 2019
Label: Masterworks

Thom Yorke: Anima
Release Date: 19 July 2019
Label: XL Recordings

Thom Yorke: Suspiria (Music for the Luca Guadagnino Film)
Release Date: 26 October 2019
Label: XL Recordings

Dying Light 2: Stay Human
Release Date: 4 February 2022
Composer: Olivier Deriviere

The Smile: A Light for Attracting Attention feat. strings by the London Contemporary Orchestra
Release Date: 13 May 2022
Label: XL Recordings

The Smile: Wall of Eyes
Release Date: 26 січня 2024
Label: XL Recordings

== New works ==
- Emily Hall: "Put Flesh On!" (2008)
- Colin Alexander: "Potential Fracture Lines" (2008)
- Jonathan Cole: "Assassin Hair", revised version (2008)
- Howard Quin: "Combination Curves" (2009)
- Jonathan Cole: "burburbabbar za" (2009)
- Shiva Feshareki: "TTKonzert" (2010)
- Tristan Brookes: "Ur" (2010)
- Emily Hall and Toby Litt: "Songs" (2010)
- Mira Calix and Larry Goves: "pedotin"; "ipo" (2010)
- Simon Fisher Turner: "Attitude" (2010)
- Jonathan Cole / Colin Alexander: "Forum" (2011)
- Martin Suckling: "de sol y grana" (2011)
- Gabriel Prokofiev: "Concerto for Bass Drum and Orchestra" (2012)
- William Basinski (arr. Maxim Moston) "Disintegration Loop 2.1" (2012)
- Actress: Audio Track 5 (2017)
