= A Little Too Late =

A Little Too Late and It's a Little Too Late may refer to:

- "A Little Too Late" (Pat Benatar song), a 1983 single by Pat Benatar
- "It's a Little Too Late" (Tanya Tucker song), a 1993 single by Tanya Tucker
- "It's a Little Too Late" (Mark Chesnutt song), a 1996 single by Mark Chesnutt
- "A Little Too Late" (Delta Goodrem song), a 2005 single by Delta Goodrem
- "A Little Too Late" (Toby Keith song), a 2006 single by Toby Keith

== See also ==
- "Too Little Too Late", a song by JoJo
- "Too Little Too Late" (Barenaked Ladies song)
- Too Little, Too Late (Third Watch), an episode of the television series Third Watch
- "Too Much, Too Little, Too Late", a song by Johnny Mathis and Deniece Williams
- Too Much, Too Little, Too Late (EP), by Silver Sun
