= Ryuichi Sakamoto: Coda =

2017 documentary film by Stephen Nomura Schible

- Directed by: Stephen Nomura Schible
- Produced by: Stephen Nomura Schible; Eric Nyari; Yoshiko Hasimoto
- Cinematography: Neo Sora; Tom Richmond
- Edited by: Hisayo Kushida; Yuji Oshige
- Music by: Ryuichi Sakamoto
- Production companies: Cineric; Borderland Media
- Distributed by: Mubi
- Release date: 2017
- Running time: 101 minutes
- Countries: United States, Japan
- Languages: Japanese, English

Ryuichi Sakamoto: Coda is a 2017 documentary film directed by Stephen Nomura Schible. The film chronicles the life and career of Japanese composer Ryuichi Sakamoto and covers his experiences surviving cancer, his environmental activism following the Fukushima disaster, and his musical inspirations, including his interest in ambient sounds and film scoring.

Schible became interested in Sakamoto when his artistic style shifted following the 2011 Japanese earthquake.

The documentary was shot over a five-year span, starting in the summer of 2012. Sakamoto was diagnosed and treated for stage 3 throat cancer during filming, and the documentary was largely shot during Sakamoto's work on the score to Alejandro G. Inarritu's The Revenant.

== Release ==
The film was first released in theaters in South Korea on June 14, 2018. It was released in theaters in the United States on July 6, 2018, and in Japanese theaters on November 4, 2018.

The documentary had its world premiere at the 75th Venice International Film Festival, where it received highly favorable reviews. It was released for streaming on Mubi on September 7, 2018.

== Reception ==
=== Box office ===
Ryuichi Sakamoto: Coda grossed $117,460 in the United States with an additional $845,390 in other territories for a total of $962,850 worldwide.

During its domestic theatrical run, Ryuichi Sakamoto: Coda was shown in theaters for 179 days, equivalent to 25 weeks. At its peak, the film was screened in nine theaters during the week of August 10–16, 2023. In its opening week, the film made $19,319 from one theater. During its widest release, the per-theater average dropped to $1,389.

Internationally, Ryuichi Sakamoto: Coda grossed $721,945 in China, where it ran for 54 weeks. In South Korea, it earned $92,906, with a peak presence in forty-seven theaters and a run time of 28 weeks. In the United Kingdom, the film grossed $15,020, with a peak presence in thirteen theaters and a run time of 26 weeks.

=== Critical reception ===
On the review aggregator website Rotten Tomatoes, the film has an approval rating of 98%, based on 48 critic reviews with an average rating of 7.8/10. Its critical consensus reads, "Ryuichi Sakamoto: Coda takes a thoughtful look at the composer's life and legacy that should prove affecting and illuminating for novices as well as longtime fans." Metacritic, which uses a weighted average, assigned the film a score of 78 out of 100, based on 13 reviews.

Film critic Peter Bradshaw gave Ryuichi Sakamoto: Coda three out of five. David Stratton, a prominent critic from The Australian, rated the film with a score of three and a half out of five. He deemed the documentary a "useful insight into the work of a major composer" despite its less impressive cinematography. Writing for Variety, Dennis Harvey described the documentary as a "handsome, intriguing if not particularly insightful" portrayal of the composer. He acknowledged the film's meditative pace and attractive cinematography while ultimately suggesting that it "flatters the subject without ultimately quite doing him justice". Ben Kenigsberg's review for The New York Times lauded the documentary as an "uncommonly engaging artist portrait". He highlights the film's ability to immerse viewers in Sakamoto's intellectual and emotional realm, emphasizing the shared excitement in finding the perfect sonic harmony. Kenigsberg also praises the documentary's focus on Sakamoto's performances, applauding Schible's decision to prioritize the music's prominence.

David Rooney's of The Hollywood Reporter hailed the film as a "deep dive into the artistry of an original thinker". He described it as a "gentle, reflective portrait" that effectively captures Sakamoto's creative process, despite its lack of personal details. Rooney praised Schible's departure from conventional biographical detail in the documentary, noting its ability to coalesce an expansive view of Sakamoto's eclectic output and artistic process. His review highlighted the film's focus on Sakamoto's synth-pop era and his work on significant film scores, while also commending the inclusion of archival footage and intimate moments in Sakamoto's home studio. Kevin Maher's review in The Times characterized the documentary as "never busy, never intrusive", gracefully maintaining a gentle tempo while remaining "calm, respectful and thoughtful". He rated the film with a score of four out of five.

In a less favorable review, Greg Cwik of Slant Magazine gave the film one and a half out of four, and characterized it as "listless". He criticized its execution for relying on "lazy synchronicity" and notes that the documentary feels "artificially intimate", rendering Sakamoto's "genuine spirituality and empathy awkward and disingenuous, as if he’s posturing for the camera". The review highlights the editing as "chicanerous", particularly in scenes like Sakamoto's homage at a pantheon, where the camera work and cuts create a staged atmosphere. Cwik contrasts it unfavorably with other music documentaries, such as Paul Thomas Anderson’s Junun, citing its lack of vision and spontaneity. Overall, he points out that the documentary fails to enhance the experience of Sakamoto's album async or provide meaningful insights into the artist's life and work, ultimately deeming it a wasted opportunity.
