= Dragonflies (band) =

British rock band

- Origin: London, England, UK
- Genre: rock
- Years active: 2026–present
- Label: Dark Horse Records
- Members: Dhani Harrison; Nigel Godrich
- Website: https://www.dragonfliesuk.com/

Dragonflies is a British rock band formed by Dhani Harrison and Nigel Godrich. They released their debut album on September 18, 2026 via Dark Horse Records/BMG. The project unites Harrison—known for collaborations with thenewno2 and Fistful of Mercy, and who is the son of George Harrison—with musician and producer Nigel Godrich, known for his work with Radiohead, Beck, IDLES, Atoms for Peace and Ultraísta.

The band features Harrison on vocals and guitar, Godrich on guitar and production, Joey Waronker on percussion, Nick Valensi on guitar, Maurice Talbot on keyboards, and string arrangements by David Campbell.

== Members ==
- Dhani Harrison – guitar, vocals
- Nigel Godrich - bass
- Joey Waronker - percussion
- Nick Valensi - guitar
- Maurice Talbot - keyboards

== Discography ==
Studio albums

- Dragonflies (2026)

== Miscellaneous ==
Their US network television debut was Friday, September 18, 2026 on ABC's Jimmy Kimmel show.

The cover art for their first album is by Claire Burbridge.
