= Claire Burbridge =

American painter and installation artist (born 1971)

- Born: United Kingdom
- Education: Oxford
- Website: claireburbridge.com

Claire Burbridge (born 1971) is a British-born artist living in Oregon, known for her paintings and drawings of nature.

== Early life and education ==
Burbridge took a BA in Fine Art and History of Art from the Ruskin School of Drawing and Fine Art, Magdalen College, Oxford in 1993. She then earned an MFA in Fine Art Printmaking from Camberwell College of Arts, University of the Arts London in 1995.

== Career ==
Her exhibitions include Pathways to the Invisible in 2020 at Jordan Schnitzer Museum of Art, The Presence of Nature in 2022 in the Schneider Museum of Art at Southern Oregon University, and Peripheral Visions in 2024 with Nancy Toomey Fine Art in San Francisco. .

Her group exhibitions include the Royal Academy Summer Exhibition in 1999, Shooting the Moon at Cincinnati's Carl Solway Gallery in 2014, and On Earth a Fragile Existence at the Jordan Schnitzer Museum of Art in 2023. She had key billing in two group shows at Karin Clarke Gallery: Florae Animalia in 2024 with Olga Volchkova, and Luminous Worlds in 2026. Individual pieces have appeared in several international art fairs.

Public holdings of her pieces include the Ashmolean Museum, Oxford, the Jordan Schnitzer Museum of Art, the Huntington Museum of Art in West Virginia,, Western Oregon University, Southern Oregon University, and other commissions with Oregon’s Percent for Art program.

=== Other projects ===
In 2019 she collaborated on the limited-edition opera score of The Tempest with Thomas Adès, and the cover and promotional artwork for the debut album of Dragonflies with Dhani Harrison and Nigel Godrich.

== Personal life ==
She lives and works in Ashland, Oregon with her husband and fellow artist Matthew Picton. In her biography she writes that she continues her "investigations into natural form, perception, and the unseen geometries of life."
