= Dad's Weird Dream =

Studio album by Silver Sun
- Released: 11 September 2006
- Genre: Power pop
- Length: 37:39
- Label: Invisible Hands

Silver Sun chronology
Disappear Here (2005)	Dad's Weird Dream (2006)	A Lick and a Promise (2013)

Singles from Dad's Weird Dream
- 1. "Fallen" Released: 9 April 2007

Professional ratings
Review scores
Source	Rating
Entertainment Manchester	4/5 stars

Dad's Weird Dream was the fourth studio album from British band Silver Sun The album was first released in Japan, where the band had steadily built a large fan base. Unlike its predecessor Disappear Here, the album was recorded by the whole band, though drummer Richard Sayce is only credited with backing vocals as programmed drums were used.

The album was remixed for the UK version of the album where it was released on 4 December 2006. Track One, "Fallen", was remixed by producer Nigel Godrich, his first involvement with the band since their debut album Silver Sun.

== Track listing ==
1. "Fallen" – 2:04
2. "Sunday Gurl" – 3:20
3. "Facts of Life" – 3:11
4. "Find Him and Love Him" – 2:55
5. "Hi Scorpia" – 2:32
6. "Rock and Roll Widow" – 2:58
7. "See me in my Dreams" – 2:14
8. "That's Just What She Wants" – 3:18
9. "Sweet Lucy" – 2:33
10. "Getting it Together in the Country" – 2:28
11. "Poppin" – 3:37
12. "You Can Love" – 2:42
13. "Dad's Weird Dream" – 3:54

== Personnel ==
- James Broad - lead vocals, guitar, saxophone
- Paul Smith - guitar
- Richard Kane - bass, piano, vocals
- Richard Sayce - vocals
