= Sister (Ultraísta album) =

Studio album by Ultraísta
- Released: 13 March 2020
- Length: 42:33
- Label: Partisan Records
- Producer: Nigel Godrich

Ultraísta chronology
Ultraísta (2012)	Sister (2020)

Singles from Sister
- 1. "Tin King" Released: 14 January 2020; 2. "Anybody" Released: 12 February 2020; 3. "Harmony" Released: 13 March 2020; 4. "Ordinary Boy" Released: 29 September 2020

Professional ratings
Aggregate scores
Source	Rating
Metacritic	74/100
Review scores
Source	Rating
AllMusic	3.5/5 stars
Paste	8.1/10
Pitchfork	6.2/10
Under the Radar	6.5/10

Sister is the second studio album by British experimental rock trio Ultraísta. It was released on 13 March 2020 under Partisan Records. It was released immediately prior to the worldwide COVID-19 pandemic, leading to the album's promotional roll-out, touring, and subsequent interviews being affected.

== Release ==
The first single "Tin King" was released on 14 January 2020, with two more singles "Anybody" and "Harmony" following in the coming months. "Ordinary Boy" was released as a single in September of 2020 along with a remix EP following on 6 November. An additional extended play, Sister Remix EP, for the album released on 12 March 2021, featuring remixes from Zero 7, Grenda, Portico Quartet, Erland Cooper, and Harvey Causon.

A half-hour short film, entitled Sister, was directed by Nigel Godrich and released featuring the four singles from the album and lead singer Laura Bettinson walking throughout London, with cameos from Godrich and Joey Waronker.

== Critical reception ==
Sister was met with generally favourable reviews from critics. At Metacritic, which assigns a weighted average rating out of 100 to reviews from mainstream publications, this release received an average score of 74, based on 5 reviews.

== Track listing ==
All songs are written by Ultraísta.

Sister track listing
No.	Title	Length
1.	"Tin King"	3:55
2.	"Harmony"	4:41
3.	"Anybody"	4:12
4.	"Save It 'Til Later"	4:22
5.	"Ordinary Boy"	4:50
6.	"Mariella"	5:11
7.	"Water in My Veins"	5:16
8.	"Bumblebees"	5:17
9.	"The Moon and Mercury"	4:49

== Personnel ==
- Laura Bettinson - vocals, synthesizer, songwriting
- Nigel Godrich - production, bass guitar, orchestration, synthesizer, songwriting
- Joey Waronker - drums, percussion, songwriting

== Charts ==
Chart performance for Sister
Chart (2020)	Peak position
UK Independent Albums (Official Charts)	28
