= Junun (album) =

2015 studio album

Studio album by Shye Ben Tzur, Jonny Greenwood and the Rajasthan Express
- Released: 20 November 2015
- Recorded: 2015 in Mehrangarh Fort, Rajasthan, India
- Length: 58:04
- Label: Nonesuch Records
- Producer: Jonny Greenwood

Shye Ben Tzur chronology
Shoshan (2010)	Junun (2015)	Halel (2023)

Jonny Greenwood chronology
Inherent Vice (2014)	Junun (2015)	Phantom Thread (2018)

The Rajasthan Express chronology
Junun (2015)	Ranjha (2026)

Junun is a 2015 album by the Israeli musician Shye Ben Tzur, the English musician Jonny Greenwood and the Indian ensemble the Rajasthan Express. It was produced by Greenwood and engineered and mixed by Nigel Godrich, the longtime producer for Greenwood's band Radiohead.

Greenwood first performed with Ben Tzur and his band in 2014. For Junun, they set up a recording studio in Mehrangarh Fort in Rajasthan, India, and hired only local musicians. The Rajasthan Express incorporated Qawwali and Muslim Roma musicians and a brass section who had played in weddings and parades.

Ben Tzur wrote the songs, with Greenwood contributing guitar, bass, keyboards, ondes Martenot and programming. He wanted to use chords sparingly, and instead write using North Indian ragas. Greenwood and Godrich hoped to capture the "roughness" of music in India, rather than pursue the high fidelity of many world music recordings. The recording was the subject of a documentary by Paul Thomas Anderson, released in October 2015.

Junun received generally positive reviews. The group supported Radiohead's 2018 Moon Shaped Pool tour, performing under the name Junun.

== Background ==
The Israeli composer Shye Ben Tzur, who had been living in India for over a decade, was contacted by the Radiohead guitarist Jonny Greenwood, who admired his music. In 2014, Greenwood performed with Ben Tzur and his band. Greenwood described Ben Tzur's music as "quite celebratory, more like gospel music than anything—except that it's all done to a backing of Indian harmoniums and percussion". He described his role as "supportive" rather than "soloistic".

== Recording ==
Greenwood and Ben Tzur agreed on things they would not do; for example, Greenwood insisted they hire only musicians from Rajasthan, India, and only use string instruments native to the region. Ben Tzur, Greenwood and the Radiohead producer Nigel Godrich set up a recording studio in Mehrangarh Fort in Rajasthan. They were joined by a group they named the Rajasthan Express, incorporating musicians from three traditions: Qawwali (Sufi musicians from Southeast Asia); Muslim Roma; and brass players who performed at weddings and parades. Ben Tzur wrote the songs, with Greenwood contributing guitar, bass, keyboards, ondes Martenot and programming. Greenwood produced the album and Godrich engineered.

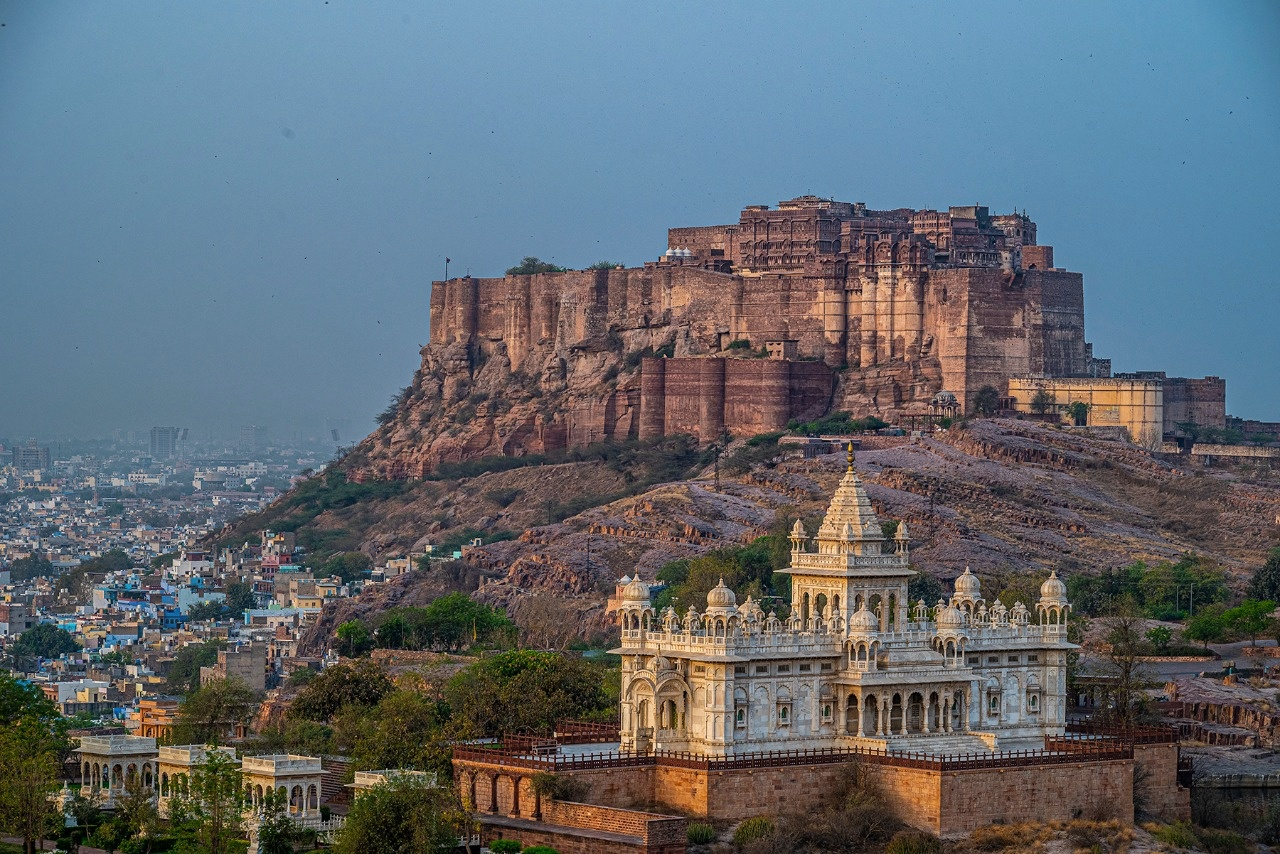
Mehrangarh Fort in Rajasthan, where Junun was recorded

The initial proposal was to record in a desert. Godrich investigated recording studios in India, but found nothing appropriate. He and Radiohead had recorded several albums by assembling recording equipment in unusual locations in England to create a different atmosphere. For Junun, Godrich shipped equipment to India and assembled it in the fort.

According to Pitchfork, Junun incorporates "Bollywood-style brass exuberance, the devotional Qawwali music of Sufi Islam, and bowed-string instruments associated with the Manganiar community". Whereas western music is based on harmonies and chord progressions, Greenwood wanted to use chords sparingly, and instead write using North Indian ragas. He said: "There's no major or minor in Indian music, which is very peculiar for someone who's used to playing with Radiohead and coming up with chord sequences ... As soon as you start imposing chords on this kind of music, you pin it down and force melodies onto it to have some sort of harmonic language that they don't really have, [Indian] music is more ambiguous than that." He likened the music to the work of James Brown, describing it as "ecstatic".

Greenwood and Godrich wanted to avoid the "obsession" with high fidelity in recording world music, and instead capture the "dirt" and "roughness" of music in India. Greenwood said: "When lots of westerners go to India they make music with lots of respect, but sometimes it feels a bit like there's too much respect. People can be too wary, too wary to make anything that captures the real roughness of some of this music, especially the way the brass bands play when they're following processions and weddings down backstreets and the like." To capture less polished recordings, the singers used handheld microphones. The lyrics are in Hebrew, Hindi, and Urdu. Some singers sang phonetically in languages they did not know. All the reverb is natural and was recorded in a large space beneath the fort.

The recording is the subject of a documentary, Junun, by Paul Thomas Anderson, released in October 2015. Greenwood had previously composed soundtracks for several Anderson films. Greenwood, Ben Tzur and the Rajasthan Express were a support act on Radiohead's 2018 Moon Shaped Pool tour.

== Critical reception ==
Professional ratings
Aggregate scores
Source	Rating
AnyDecentMusic?	7.6/10
Metacritic	79/100
Review scores
Source	Rating
AllMusic	4/5 stars
Consequence of Sound	B
Clash	4/5 stars
Drowned in Sound	7/10
Exclaim!	8/10
NME	3/5 stars
Pitchfork	8.0/10
PopMatters	4/5 stars
Spin	8/10
Uncut	3.5/5 stars

Junun received generally positive reviews. At the review aggregation site Metacritic, it has an average score of 79, based on 10 reviews, indicating "generally favourable reviews". Aggregator AnyDecentMusic? gave it 7.6 out of 10, based on their assessment of the critical consensus.

Pitchfork wrote: "The ensemble's playing and [Ben Tzur's] compositions make Junun an easy stretch—though, crucially, not a condescending one—for listeners otherwise unfamiliar with the great variety of methods often obscured by 'world music' market-speak." The Guardian wrote: "Greenwood contributes subtle embellishments – occasional electronic beats, as well as understated guitar and bass – rather than any scene-stealing showboating. Indeed, the real stars here are the Rajasthan Express's six-piece brass section."

== Track listing ==
1. "Junun" – 5:54
2. "Roked" – 3:21
3. "Hu" – 7:49
4. "Chala Vahi Des" – 4:16
5. "Kalandar" – 8:50
6. "Eloah" – 3:55
7. "Julus" – 3:44
8. "Allah Elohim" – 4:21
9. "Ahuvi" – 5:08
10. "Azov" – 3:50
11. "Junun Brass" – 3:29
12. "There Are Birds in the Echo Chamber" – 0:32
13. "Modeh" – 5:35

== Personnel ==
- Shye Ben Tzur – vocal, guitar, flute
- Jonny Greenwood – guitar, bass guitar, drum machine and computers, ondes martenot, keyboard
- Aamir Bhiyani – lead trumpet
- Hazmat – tuba
- Ajaj Damami – trombone
- Sabir Damami – tuba
- Soheb Bhiyani – trumpet
- Bhanwaru Khan – tuba
- Zakir Ali Qawwal – Qawwali vocal, harmonium
- Zaki Ali Qawwal – Qawwali vocal
- Gufran Ali, Shazib Ali – Qawwali chorus
- Ehtisham Khan Ajmer – Qawwali chorus, dholak
- Chugge Khan – percussion (khartal, bhapang, manjeera)
- Nihal Khan – dholak
- Nathu Lal Solanki – nagara
- Narsi Lal Solanki – nagara
- Asin Khan – sarangi on "Hu", vocal on "Ahuvi"
- Dara Khan – kamaicha on "Hu" and "Ahuvi"
- Afshana Khan – vocal on "Chala Vahi Des"
- Razia Sultan – vocal on "Chala Vahi Des," "Allah Elohim"
- Nigel Godrich – mixing and engineering
