= Ranjha (album) =

Studio album by Shye Ben Tzur, Jonny Greenwood, and the Rajasthan Express
- Released: 8 May 2026
- Length: 47:50
- Labels: World Circuit; BMG
- Producers: Jonny Greenwood; Sam Petts-Davies

Shye Ben Tzur chronology
Halel (2023)	Ranjha (2026)

Jonny Greenwood chronology
One Battle After Another (2025)	Ranjha (2026)

The Rajasthan Express chronology
Junun (2015)	Ranjha (2026)

Singles from Ranjha
- 1. "Ranjha" Released: 10 March 2026; 2. "Shemesh" Released: 8 April 2026

Ranjha is the second album by the Israeli composer Shye Ben Tzur, the English composer Jonny Greenwood, and the Indian ensemble the Rajasthan Express, released on 8 May 2026 via World Circuit and BMG.

== Background ==
Ben Tzur, Greenwood and the Rajasthan Express recorded their first album together, Junun (2015), at Mehrangarh Fort in Rajasthan, India. They began writing Ranjha while supporting Greenwood's band Radiohead on the tour for Radiohead's 2016 album A Moon Shaped Pool, but work was delayed by the COVID-19 pandemic. The writing sessions concluded in Italy. One of the qawwali singers, Zaki Sahib, died suddenly after a rehearsal in India, which Greenwood said was "devastating".

== Recording ==
Recording took place in Greenwood's Oxfordshire studio with the producer Sam Petts-Davies. The album involved 21 musicians, including the Rajasthan Express providing rhythm and brass, and Tom Skinner, the drummer for the Radiohead side project the Smile. According to Pitchfork, Skinner does not emphasise the downbeats and his cymbal work emphasises texture over rhythm.

The group decided to use a more conventional recording studio to create a different mood from Junun. Additionally, Greenwood wanted to give the Indian musicians the experience of living and working in the UK, and said: "If a project is going to be collaborative, it felt like there should be a straight exchange of experience for all the musicians." Acquiring work visas for the Indian musicians proved difficult, as many of them did not have addresses or did not know their date of birth. The group recorded for "two or three weeks ... playing all day every day".

== Release ==
Professional ratings
Review scores
Source	Rating
Financial Times	4/5 stars
Pitchfork	7.0/10

In early March 2026, Greenwood announced Ranjha and released the lead single, "Ranjha", with a music video directed by Ian Patrick. Ranjha was on 8 May 2026 via World Circuit and BMG via streaming, download, CD, and a red and coral splatter vinyl record.

== Reception ==
The Financial Times gave Ranjha four out of five, writing: "The music is bustling and cosmopolitan, less contemplative in tone than Junun. It goes where it wants to go, and we follow, however far that might be from the world as it is outside the recording studio." Pitchfork wrote that the qawwali singers were the album's "emotional core" and that "once you give in to their performance, it's hard to focus on anything else".

== Track listing ==
All lyrics are written by Shye Ben-Tzur, except where noted; all music is composed by Jonny Greenwood and Shye Ben-Tzur.

No.	Title	Lyrics	Length
1.	"Shiqwa"	Bedam Shah Warsi; Hazrat Khadim Hasan Gudri Shah Baba III	4:56
2.	"Marbolot"		4:44
3.	"Ranjha"	Baba Bulleh Shah	4:51
4.	"Shemesh"		6:02
5.	"Shiqwa (Reprise)"		2:39
6.	"Ishq-e-Majnun"	Amir Khusrau; Baba III	5:47
7.	"Saqi"	Baba III	4:30
8.	"Marbolot (Reprise)"		1:34
9.	"Aviv"		4:22
10.	"Mustt"		3:47
11.	"Sharminda"	Baba III	4:38
Total length:			47:50

== Personnel ==
Credits are adapted from Tidal.

- Shye Ben Tzur – flute (all tracks); vocals, guitars (tracks 1–9, 11)
- Jonny Greenwood – production, bass guitar, guitars (all tracks); drum machine, keyboards, ondes Martenot (1–9, 11)
- Sam Petts-Davies – production, mixing
- Oliver Middleton – engineering
- Matt Colton – mastering
- Zakir Ali – pump organ (1–4, 6–11), vocals (1–4, 6–9, 11)
- Nathu Lal Solanki – nagara (1–4, 6–11)
- Aamir Bhiyani – trumpet (1–4, 6–9, 11)
- Ehtisham Khan Ajmeri – chorus vocals (1–4, 6–9, 11)
- Nafees Khan Ajmeri – vocals (1–4, 6, 7, 9, 11)
- Raish Naimee – chorus vocals (1–4, 6, 7, 9, 11)
- Shabbir Khan – chorus vocals (1–4, 6, 7, 9, 11)
- Shazeeb Khan – chorus vocals (1–4, 6, 7, 9, 11)
- Sitab Khan – chorus vocals (1–4, 6, 7, 9, 11)
- Sohrab Khan – chorus vocals (1–4, 6, 7, 9, 11)
- Tom Skinner – drums, percussion (1, 2, 6, 9)
- Ateeq Hussain Khan – vocals (1, 4, 6, 7, 11)
- Kashif Hussain Khan – chorus vocals (1, 4, 6, 7, 11)
- Mohammed Shafi Ullah Khan – chorus vocals (1, 4, 6, 7, 11)
- Salman Hussain Khan – chorus vocals (1, 4, 6, 7, 11)
- Jyotsna Srikanth – violin (4, 9)
- Robert Stillman – bass clarinet (6)
