= Ultraísta (album) =

Studio album by Ultraísta
- Released: 2 October 2012
- Genre: Electronica, indie rock
- Length: 37:45
- Label: Temporary Residence
- Producer: Nigel Godrich

Ultraísta chronology
Ultraísta (2012)	Sister (2020)

Singles from Ultraísta
- 1. "Smalltalk" Released: 9 May 2012

Professional ratings
Aggregate scores
Source	Rating
Metacritic	64/100
Review scores
Source	Rating
AllMusic	3.5/5 stars
Consequence of Sound	C+
The Guardian	3/5 stars
MusicOMH	2.5/5 stars
Pitchfork	6.4/10
Rolling Stone	3/5 stars
Under the Radar	8/10

Ultraísta is the debut studio album by British experimental rock band Ultraísta. It was released 2 October 2012 by Temporary Residence Limited.

The first single, "Smalltalk", was released 9 May 2012. Following the release of the album, touring from the band was cut short after drummer Joey Waronker had his first child. This same touring issue would occur when the promotion for the band's sophomore album would be affected by the COVID-19 pandemic.

On 22 November 2019, a deluxe version of the album was released. It includes all the remixes of songs from the album that had been released in 2013, featuring remixes from Zero 7, David Lynch, CHVRCHES, Four Tet, among others.

== Critical reception ==
Ultraísta was met with generally favourable reviews from critics. At Metacritic, which assigns a weighted average rating out of 100 to reviews from mainstream publications, this release received an average score of 64, based on 16 reviews

== Accolades ==
Publication	Accolade	Rank	Ref.
Under the Radar	Top 100 Albums of 2012	47	

== Track listing ==
All tracks written by Ultraísta.

Ultraísta track listing
No.	Title	Length
1.	"Bad Insect"	4:30
2.	"Gold Dayzz"	3:21
3.	"Static Light"	3:16
4.	"Strange Formula"	3:41
5.	"Our Song"	3:23
6.	"Easier"	3:56
7.	"Smalltalk"	3:59
8.	"Party Line"	3:07
9.	"Wash It Over"	3:49
10.	"You're Out"	4:43
Total length:		37:45

Ultraísta (Deluxe)
No.	Title	Length
11.	"Smalltalk (Four Tet Remix)"	6:03
12.	"Smalltalk (Matthew Dear Remix)"	7:36
13.	"You're Out (Prefuse 73 Remix)"	5:27
14.	"Gold Dayzz (FaltyDL Remix)"	3:52
15.	"Gold Dayzz (Maribou State Remix)"	4:55
16.	"Wash It Over (ERAAS Remix)"	4:45
17.	"Party Line (Nathan Fake Remix)"	4:50
18.	"Easier (Zammuto Remix)"	4:03
19.	"Static Light (Matthew Herbert Remix)"	4:08
20.	"Bad Insect (DC Sux Remix)"	4:17
21.	"Our Song (Zero 7 Remix)"	6:41
22.	"Strange Formula (David Lynch Remix)"	4:15
23.	"Gold Dayzz (CHVRCHES Remix)"	4:18
24.	"Bad Insect (Alpines Remix)"	3:37
25.	"Smalltalk (Crewdson Remix)"	5:19
26.	"Party Line (Canon Blue Remix)"	3:49
27.	"Gold Dayzz (Boom Bip Remix)"	5:07
28.	"Smalltalk (Justin Martin Remix)"	4:34
29.	"Smalltalk (Sasha Involv3r Remix)"	10:11

== Personnel ==
- Laura Bettinson - vocals, synthesizer, songwriting
- Nigel Godrich - production, bass guitar, synthesizer, songwriting
- Joey Waronker - drums, percussion, songwriting
