= Shahi Lal Dera =

Imperial Mughal tent

Shahi Lal Dera (Red Tent, Royal red tent, Lal Dera) is an imperial Mughal tent. It is a fabric structure owned by the fifth Mughal emperor Shah Jahan. Shahi Lal Dera was used as a moveable palace.

== Features ==
Shahi Lal Dera is the only surviving example of a Mughal tent in its entirety. The 17th-century encampment is part of Mehrangarh's royal collection in Jodhpur. it is a magnificent tent. Its regal status is reflected in the color red and the crenellated crown on top. Lal Dera is crafted entirely of silk, velvet, and gold. It has beautiful embroidery and brocade patterns. The tent has beautiful bolsters for the throne of the Mughal emperor, as well as lobed archways and a colonnaded interior chamber. The tent has a four-meter-high ceiling, comparable in size to a double-decker bus.

Abu'l-Fazl ibn Mubarak talks at length in Ain-i-Akbari about the Mughal emperors' vested interests in textiles, weapons, and tents.

=== Restoring ===
As of 2017, it was undergoing maintenance to clean and conserve it.

== See also ==
- Mughal Karkhanas
- Mughal architecture
