= Disappear Here (Silver Sun album) =

Studio album by Silver Sun
- Released: 18 April 2005
- Genre: Power pop
- Length: 30:33
- Label: Invisible Hands

Silver Sun chronology
| Neo Wave (1998) | Disappear Here (2005) | Dad's Weird Dream (2006) |

Singles from Disappear Here
- 1. "Bubblegum" Released: 1 November 2004; 2. "Immediate" Released: 21 November 2005

Professional ratings
Review scores
| Source | Rating |
|---|---|
| Drowned In Sound | (8/10) |

Disappear Here was the third full studio album by the British band Silver Sun. The release came seven years after their second album Neo Wave and was their first release on the Invisible Hands label. The album was unusual in that lead vocalist James Broad recorded the album single-handedly, whilst the rest of the band were continuing to work on various other side projects. However, the band continued to work together on live gigs to promote the album.

== Track listing ==
All tracks written by James Broad.

1. "Bubblegum" – 3:47
2. "Lies" – 3:00
3. "Can't get you out of my Head" – 3:34
4. "Found you in a Dream" – 1:48
5. "Immediate" – 2:52
6. "Jody" – 3:24
7. "Garlic" – 3:08
8. "Pipsqueak" – 2:19
9. "She wants a Puppy, She'll have a Puppy" – 3:37
10. "You can't Kill Rock & Roll" – 3:04

== Personnel ==
James Broad - All instruments
