= Neo Wave =

Studio album by Silver Sun
- Released: 5 October 1998
- Recorded: ICP Studios, Belgium, April/May 1998
- Genre: Power pop
- Length: 47:34
- Label: Polydor
- Producer: Al Clay

Silver Sun chronology
Too Much, Too Little, Too Late EP (1998)	Neo Wave (1998)	Disappear Here (2005)

Singles from Neo Wave
- 1. "Too Much, Too Little, Too Late" Released: 8 June 1998; 2. "I'll See You Around" Released: 14 September 1998; 3. "Sharks" Released: 7 December 1998

Professional ratings
Review scores
Source	Rating
AllMusic	2.5/5 stars
Sunday Mirror	8/10

Neo Wave is the second album by the British power pop band Silver Sun, released in 1998. It contains a cover version of the Johnny Mathis and Deniece Williams number-one US hit "Too Much, Too Little, Too Late".

The album reached No. 74 on the UK Albums Chart. Two singles reached the UK top 40: "Too Much, Too Little, Too Late" (No. 20) and "I'll See You Around" (No. 26).

== Critical reception ==
The Sunday Mirror wrote: "Quirky guitar spankers with funny shades and a Johnny Mathis fixation mix the fast ones with the slow ones for a golden blend of fine roast pop." The Independent thought that "with their huge guitar riffs and layers of harmonies, these Midlanders offer a refreshing take on classic 1980s American rawk with a tongue-in-cheek dab of Queen's pomposity and a nod to the power-pop excellence of Cheap Trick."

AllMusic thought that "Silver Sun have created a disc that is a blatant throwback to mid-70s power-pop ... and while at times the formula works, it often falls flat."

== Track listing ==
All tracks written and composed by James Broad and Lee Collard; except where indicated.

1. "Cheerleading" – 4:03
2. "I'll See You Around" (Broad) – 3:32
3. "Would've if I Could've" – 2:45
4. "Too Much, Too Little, Too Late" (N.Kipner, J.Vallins) – 3:59
5. "Scared" – 3:01
6. "There Goes Summer" (Broad) – 2:42
7. "Sharks" – 4:16
8. "The Prophet on the Prairie" (Richard Kane) – 1:23
9. "Mustard" – 3:00
10. "Pixie, Pixie" – 3:27
11. "Hey Girl Friend" – 2:51
12. "Only a Girl" – 2:59
13. "Special Powers" (Broad) – 3:04
14. "Fire & Blood" (Broad) – 1:06
15. "Patients" – 2:48
16. "Dead End" (Broad) – 2:48

Japan track listing

1. "Cheerleading" – 4:03
2. "I'll See You Around" (Broad) – 3:32
3. "Would've if I Could've" – 2:45
4. "Too Much, Too Little, Too Late" (N.Kipner, J.Vallins) – 3:59
5. "Scared" – 3:01
6. "There Goes Summer" (Broad) – 2:42
7. "Sharks" – 4:16
8. "The Prophet on the Prairie" (Richard Kane) – 1:23
9. "Mustard" – 3:00
10. "Pixie, Pixie" – 3:27
11. "Hey Girl Friend" – 2:51
12. "Ways of Love" (Broad) – 2:22 [Bonus track]
13. "The Promised End" (Broad) – 2:13 [Bonus track]
14. "Only a Girl" – 2:59
15. "Special Powers" (Broad) – 3:04
16. "Fire & Blood" (Broad) – 1:06
17. "Patients" – 2:48
18. "Dead End" (Broad) – 2:48

== Personnel ==
- James Broad - lead vocals, guitar, saxophone
- Paul Smith - guitar
- Richard Buckton - bass, piano, vocals
- Richard Sayce - drums, vocals
- Al Clay - producer
- Bob Ludwig - mastering
