= Silver Sun =

English power pop band

- Origin: Camden, London, England
- Genres: Indie rock, power pop, Britpop
- Years active: 1995–2020
- Labels: Polydor, Invisible Hands
- Members: James Broad (deceased); Richard Buckton; Paul Smith; Richard Sayce

Silver Sun are an English power pop band, who formed in 1995 in Camden, London. They released their self-titled debut album in 1997, and after two major label releases that saw moderate success, the band released two further albums independently. Their sound is a combination of harder-edged alternative rock and classic power pop, with an emphasis on multi-layered vocal harmonies.

== Career ==
They were initially called Sun..! and released their first EP under that name. They were forced to alter the name soon afterwards, and chose 'Silver' after the Beatles' original name, the Silver Beetles; also the Beatles song "It's All Too Much" from "Yellow Submarine" has a line "Set me on a silver sun, for I know that I'm free". The single "Lava" was their first under the new name. Groups such as Super Furry Animals also wrote music in a similar style at the time, although there are also notable parallels with US bands such as Jellyfish and the earlier output of Weezer.

Their eponymous debut album was released in 1997, and was characterised by prominent vocal harmonies and energetic choruses. It was also the first album to be co-produced by Nigel Godrich, who went on to produce for Radiohead and Paul McCartney. The song "Golden Skin" was featured on the soundtrack of the 1990s British comedy film Shooting Fish.

The band toured extensively during 1997 and 1998, headlining and supporting Sleeper, James, Gene, Mansun and Ash. They also played Glastonbury, Reading, Lowlands and the V Festivals in 1997.

The band's second album Neo Wave was released the following year and was produced by Al Clay. It contained their biggest hit "Too Much, Too Little, Too Late", a cover of the Johnny Mathis ballad which the band originally recorded for fun during a B-side recording session. The EP release also contained a version of Rush's "Xanadu" which the band condensed into a four-minute pop song, as well as a cover of My Bloody Valentine's "You Made Me Realise".

In 1999, the band were dropped by Polydor Records and spent some time out pursuing other projects. Richard Buckton wrote tracks with producer Pete Woodroffe for Spice Girl Melanie C amongst others. Paul Smith took time out to gain a degree in sound technology. Richard Sayce formed the group Malibu with wife George, and James Broad continued writing further Silver Sun material.

The band released a third album, Disappear Here, in 2005, this time on the Invisible Hands label. This album was remarkable in that lead singer Broad was the sole artist to appear on the recordings, having played all musical instruments and sung all of the vocals. In spite of this, the full original line-up played at the accompanying gigs.

In a more recent rare foray into the mass-media, their song "Last Day" was used on the Hollyoaks soundtrack on 24 January 2006, the band having signed a deal with the programme in 1997 allowing them to use material.

Their fourth album, Dad's Weird Dream, was released in Japan on 11 September 2006. However, the decision was taken to remix it for the UK market, where it was released on 4 December 2006. One track, "Fallen" was remixed by Nigel Godrich, working with the band for the first time since their debut, and was available as an iTunes exclusive EP. Unlike its predecessor, the entire original line-up has participated in the recording, although Sayce is only credited with backing vocals, as the band used programmed drums for the album.

In June 2009, Broad uploaded "The Pain Don't Come So Easy", which he describes as a "new Silver Sun song", to YouTube under his user name, "lordmelbury". In December of that year, he released a new track, "Access", as a digital only download on iTunes.

Between August and October 2011, James Broad posted four songs on his SoundCloud page, under the user name "lordmelbury", and these, too, are in the Silver Sun style.

In April 2012, Silver Sun released a live, digital album containing songs from their first two albums titled Live! - More Than You'll Ever Need, and in August 2013, they released a fifth studio album, also a digital-only release, A Lick and a Promise. James Broad was listed as the sole songwriter and performer. It contained one song that had previously been available on YouTube, "The Pain Don't Come So Easy", and two on James Broad's SoundCloud page, "Little Wonder" and "Small Town Affair". The original line-up of Silver Sun reformed to support Sleeper at the Shepherd's Bush Empire in London on 2 December 2017.

James Broad died of cancer in October 2020.

== Discography ==
Silver Sun discography
- Studio albums: 6
- Extended plays: 2
- Live albums: 1
- Compilation albums: 2
- Singles: 10

=== Studio albums ===
Year	Information	Chart positions	
Year	Information	UK	JP
1997	Silver Sun: Released: 9 May 1997; Label: Polydor	30	60
1998	Neo Wave: Released: 5 October 1998; Label: Polydor	74	–
2005	Disappear Here: Released: 18 April 2005; Label: Invisible Hands Music	–	–
2006	Dad's Weird Dream: Released: 4 December 2006; Label: Invisible Hands Music	–	–
2013	A Lick and a Promise: Released: 22 August 2013; Label: Invisible Hands Music	–	–
2020	Switzerland: Released: 26 April 2020; Label: Self-released	–	–
2024	Mild Peril: Released: 07 November 2024; Label: Self-released	–	–

=== Live albums ===
Year	Information
2012	Live – More Than You'll Ever Need: Released: 23 April 2012 (Digital only release); Label: Invisible Hands Music

=== Compilation albums ===
Year	Information
1997	You Are Here: Released: 26 March 1997 (Japan only B-sides collection); Label: Polydor
1997	B Is for Silver Sun: Released: 6 November 1997 (Japan only B-sides collection); Label: Polydor

=== Extended plays ===
Year	Information	Chart positions
Year	Information	UK Singles Chart
1996	Sun..! EP: Released: 2 August 1996; Label: Polydor	142
1998	Too Much, Too Little, Too Late: Released: 14 September 1998; Label: Polydor	20

=== Singles ===
Year	Title	Album	Chart positions
Year	Title	Album	UK Singles Chart
1996	"Lava"	Silver Sun	54
1997	"Last Day"	Silver Sun	48
1997	"Golden Skin"	Silver Sun	32
1997	"Julia"	Silver Sun	51
1997	"Lava" (re-release)	Silver Sun	35
1998	"Too Much, Too Little, Too Late"	Neo Wave	20
1998	"I'll See You Around"	Neo Wave	26
2004	"Bubblegum"	Disappear Here	–
2005	"Immediate"	Disappear Here	–
2007	"Fallen"	Dad's Weird Dream	–

=== Compilation appearances ===
- 2006: Asian Kung-Fu Generation Presents: Nano–Mugen Compilation 2006 – "Bubblegum"
