= Junun (film) =

2015 documentary

- Directed by: Paul Thomas Anderson
- Edited by: Andy Jurgensen
- Music by: Shye Ben Tzur; Jonny Greenwood; The Rajasthan Express
- Production company: Ghoulardi Film Company
- Distributed by: MUBI; Amazon Prime Video iTunes Store
- Release dates: October 8, 2015 (New York Film Festival); October 9, 2015 (streaming)
- Running time: 54 minutes
- Country: United States

Junun is a 2015 documentary film directed by Paul Thomas Anderson. It documents the making of the album Junun in Mehrangarh Fort in Rajasthan, India, by the Israeli composer Shye Ben Tzur, the English composer and Radiohead guitarist Jonny Greenwood, the Indian ensemble the Rajasthan Express, and the Radiohead producer Nigel Godrich.

Junun premièred at the 2015 New York Film Festival and was released on the MUBI film streaming service on October 9, 2015 and on iTunes on November 20, 2015. It received critical acclaim.

== Production and release ==
Junun was filmed at the Mehrangarh Fort in Rajasthan, India. Much of the documentary crew's professional camera equipment was held by customs, forcing them to shoot entirely with carry-on consumer-grade digital cameras and rental equipment from India. Anderson used Godrich's drone to capture aerial footage of the fort. Production was secretive and the film was announced two months before its release.

Junun premiered at the New York Film Festival. It was released on video on demand through the MUBI film streaming service on October 9, 2015 and on iTunes on November 20.

== Reception ==
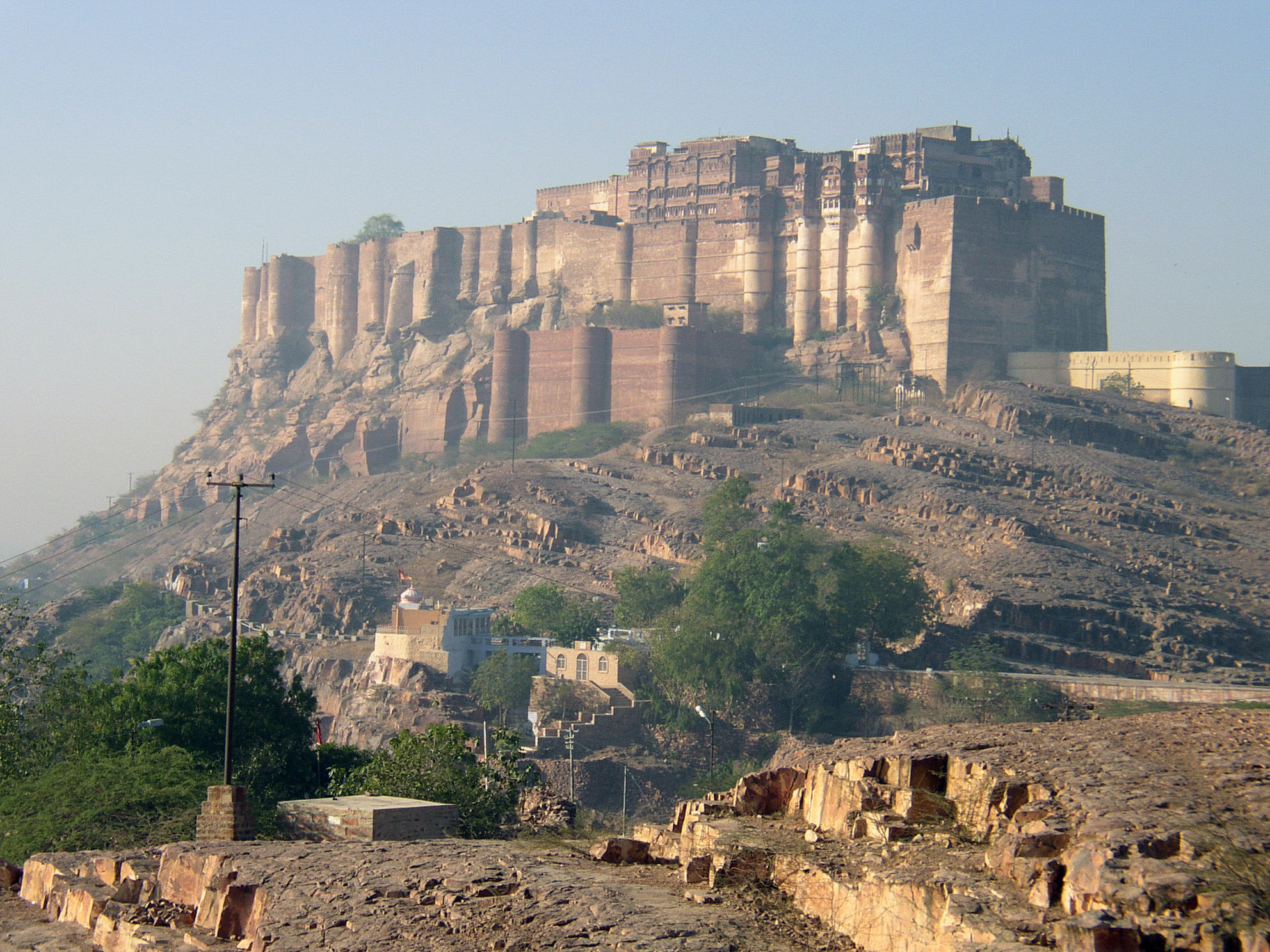
Mehrangarh Fort in Jodhpur, in the Indian state of Rajasthan, where Junun was filmed

On Rotten Tomatoes, Junun has a 100% approval rating based on 18 reviews, with an average rating of 7.9 out of 10. On Metacritic, it has a rating of 78 out of 100 based on six reviews. IndieWire gave Junun a grade of B+ and wrote that it "offers no clear-eyed statement on its subject, but develops an enveloping internal logic about the thrill of artistic innovation". Variety wrote that "Anderson’s aesthetics unobtrusively capture the magic of Greenwood and company’s global partnership. It’s a reverent tribute, and one that articulates its underlying themes in subtle, piercing snapshots."

The Hollywood Reporter described it as "a transporting film that places us right there in the room, living and breathing a singular artistic experience. Trying to remain still in your seat is futile." A.A. Dowd of The A.V. Club gave the film a grade of B and wrote: "Junun may be a minor work from a major director, but it provides plenty of bounce in the step and candy for the ears. It’s hard to ask much more of a music movie." The Guardian gave Junun three out of five, writing: "Given how fruitful and fascinating the collaboration has been between Anderson and Greenwood ... this returned favour is a little disappointing. Anderson has brought much less personality and invention to this project than Greenwood gave to [Anderson's] movies."
