= Nigel Godrich =

English producer and musician (born 1971)

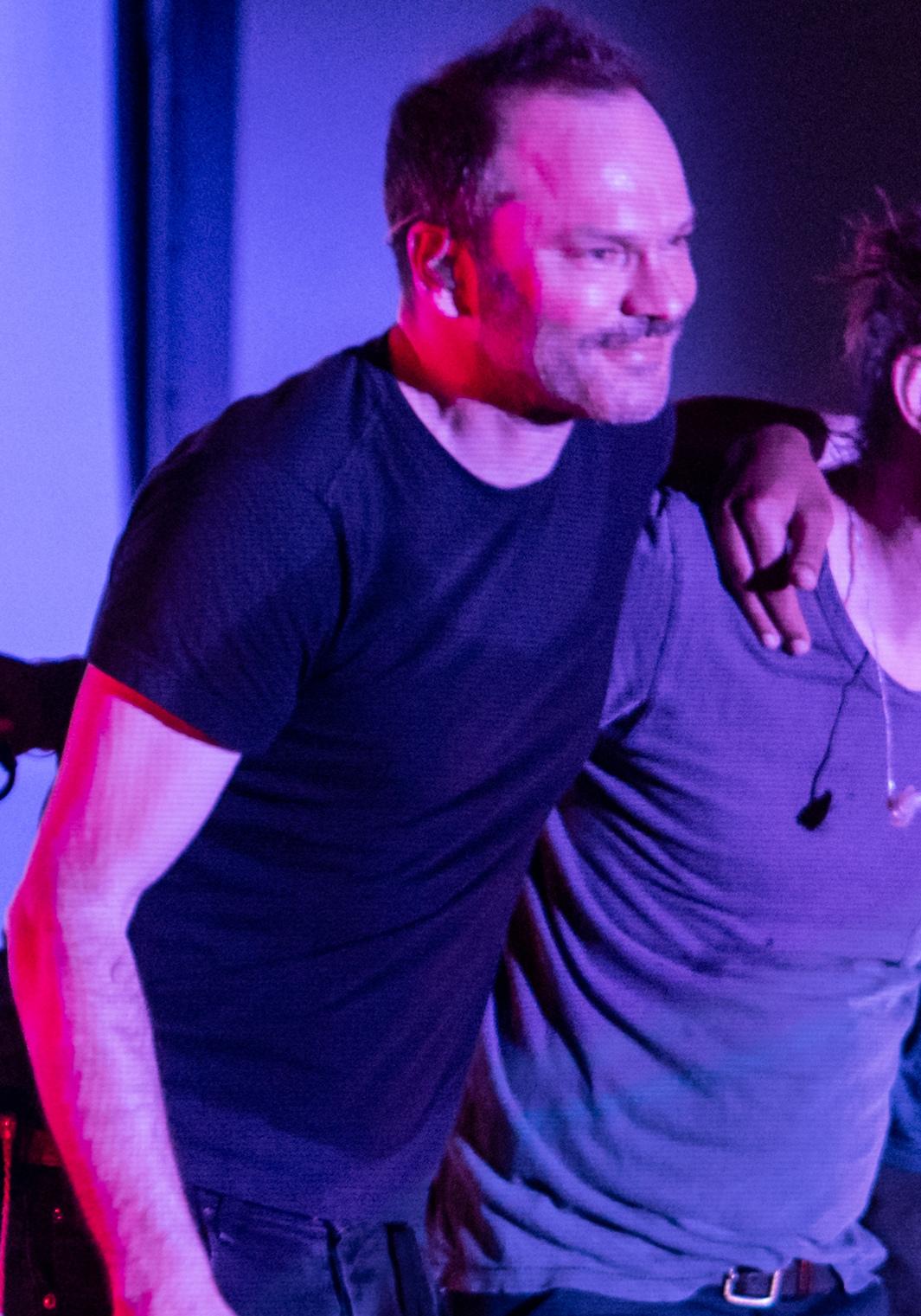
- Godrich performing with Thom Yorke in 2018

Background information
- Born: Nigel Timothy Godrich; 28 February 1971 (age 55); Westminster, London, England
- Genres: Alternative rock, experimental rock, electronic
- Occupations: Recording engineer, record producer, musician, DJ
- Instruments: Keyboards, guitar, bass
- Years active: 1990–present
- Member of: Ultraísta; Dragonflies
- Formerly of: Atoms for Peace
- Website: nigelgodrich.com

Nigel Timothy Godrich (born 28 February 1971) is an English record producer, recording engineer and musician. He has worked with acts including Radiohead, Travis, Beck, Air, Paul McCartney, U2, R.E.M., Pavement, Roger Waters, Arcade Fire and Idles.

Early in his career, Godrich worked as the house engineer at RAK Studios, London, under the producer John Leckie. He first worked with Radiohead while engineering their second album, The Bends (1995), at RAK. Radiohead hired him to produce OK Computer (1997), which was a major success and brought him attention from major artists. He has produced every Radiohead album since, along with several other projects with the Radiohead members Thom Yorke and Jonny Greenwood.

Godrich is a member of the bands Atoms for Peace (with Yorke), Dragonflies, and Ultraísta. In 2006, he launched the music webseries From the Basement. With Beck, Godrich composed the score for the 2010 film Scott Pilgrim vs. the World.

Godrich was nominated for the Grammy Award for Producer of the Year, Non-Classical in 2002, 2004, 2006 and 2009. He won the Grammy Award for Best Engineered Album, Non-Classical for the 2003 Radiohead album Hail to the Thief and was nominated again for the 2017 Waters album Is This the Life We Really Want?.

== Early life ==
Nigel Godrich was born in Westminster, London, the son of Victor Godrich, a BBC sound supervisor, and Brenda Godrich. He was fascinated by recording at an early age. As a child, after he asked for a machine to make records, his father bought him a cassette machine; Godrich used it to make recordings of his television, train sets and running water.

Godrich was educated at William Ellis School in North West London, where he shared classes with his friend and the future Zero 7 member Henry Binns. Godrich began playing guitar, inspired by Jimi Hendrix and Frank Zappa. He first visited a recording studio at the age of 16, when his band recorded a demo at Elephant Studios, Wapping, and spent time asking the engineer questions. He studied at the School of Audio Engineering (SAE), London.

== Career ==
=== RAK Studios ===
After graduating from SAE, Godrich became a junior staff member at the Audio One studio complex, working as a tea boy. He did not enjoy his time there. According to Godrich, "With a beeper in my pocket, I'd wait next to the kettle, ready to deliver my hot beverages. I wasn't even allowed in the studios, but I [would] hang there thinking, 'OK, it's only the first rung, but at least I'm on the ladder.'"

After the closure of Audio One in 1990, Godrich joined RAK Studios, London, first as a messenger and later as a studio assistant. He would stay late at night, inviting musician friends to play there while he practised recording them. At RAK, he became a tape operator for the producer John Leckie, with whom he worked on albums by Ride and Denim.

After four years, Godrich left RAK to go freelance and set up his own studio, Shabang, where he planned to create dance music. Six months later, he was hired to engineer and mix The Sound Of... McAlmont & Butler (1995), the debut album by McAlmont & Butler. Godrich said it was a "brilliant experience" and credited Bernard Butler with teaching him how to produce records. Godrich produced the Silver Sun, the debut album by Silver Sun, released in May 1997.

=== Radiohead ===
I can only ever have one band like Radiohead who I've worked with for this many years. That's a very deep and profound relationship. The Beatles could only have ever had one George Martin; they couldn't have switched producers halfway through their career. All that work, trust, and knowledge of each other would have been thrown out of the window and they’d have to start again.

— Godrich in 2016

Godrich first worked with the rock band Radiohead when John Leckie hired him at RAK to engineer their EP My Iron Lung (1994) and their second album, The Bends (1995). The band nicknamed him "Nihilist", approving of his efforts to take their sound in new directions. When Leckie left the studio to attend a social engagement, Radiohead and Godrich stayed to record B-sides. One song, "Black Star", was instead included on The Bends. In 1995, Godrich produced Radiohead's charity single "Lucky".

Radiohead invited Godrich to co-produce their third album, OK Computer (1997). It won Best Alternative Album at the 40th Grammy Awards and sold more than 4.5 million copies worldwide. Working in improvised studios without supervision, Godrich and the band learned as they went, and credited the success to the open process. In 2013, Godrich told the Guardian: "OK Computer was such a big thing for me because I was given power for the first time. Some of these incredibly intelligent and insightful people said 'do what you want' to me so I worked my arse off for them and together we did something that represents where we all were at the time. And it stuck for some reason. People got it, so that changed my life." Godrich has produced every Radiohead studio album since.

=== Pavement, Travis and Beck ===
Following OK Computer, Godrich mixed most of Natalie Imbruglia's hit album Left of the Middle (1997) and R.E.M.'s Up (1998). Godrich produced three albums by the American singer-songwriter Beck: Mutations (1998), Sea Change (2002) and The Information (2006). The first two, particularly Sea Change, were noted for their atmospheric folk/pop sound, a departure from the spontaneous, sample-heavy style Beck was known for. Godrich produced Pavement's final album, Terror Twilight (1999), with Radiohead's Jonny Greenwood contributing harmonica on two tracks. Godrich, a Pavement fan, hoped to help them find a bigger audience with a less "sloppy" record. The songwriter, Stephen Malkmus, later described the album as "overproduced" and described conflicts with Godrich. In response, Godrich tweeted: "I literally slept on a friend's floor in NYC to be able to make that album." In 2020, Godrich said that he loved Terror Twilight and had enjoyed making it.

Godrich produced the second album by Travis, The Man Who (1999), and its followup, The Invisible Band (2001). According to the Travis songwriter, Fran Healy, Godrich was frustrated after the gruelling sessions for Radiohead's albums Kid A and Amnesiac, and so "took it out on us because he couldn't take it out on Radiohead". The mood settled after an argument. Healy felt it was good for Godrich to work with "melodic" bands such as Travis as well as more experimental acts such as Radiohead.

In 2001, Godrich remixed U2's "Walk On" for its single release, and mixed and contributed production to Air's albums Talkie Walkie (2004) and Pocket Symphony (2007). In 2002, Godrich was nominated for the Grammy Award for Producer of the Year, Non-Classical. He was nominated again in 2004, 2006 and 2009.

=== Failed Strokes sessions and Paul McCartney ===
In 2002, Godrich was hired to produce the second album by the Strokes, Room on Fire (2003). He was fired when their work, according to the band, proved "soulless". Godrich said he and the singer, Julian Casablancas, were both "control freaks", and that his involvement was pointless if the band were not willing to accept his ideas. Godrich won the Grammy Award for Best Engineered Non-Classical Album for Radiohead's sixth album, Hail to the Thief (2003).

Godrich produced the 20th-anniversary version of "Do They Know It's Christmas?", released in December 2004, which featured artists including Yorke, Greenwood and Paul McCartney. McCartney hired Godrich to produce his album Chaos and Creation in the Backyard (2005) after he was recommended by the Beatles producer, George Martin. Godrich fired McCartney's touring band and demanded that he abandon songs Godrich found clichéd, over-sentimental, or subpar. Chaos and Creation in the Backyard was nominated for several Grammy Awards, including Album of the Year, and Godrich was nominated for Producer of the Year.

=== From the Basement ===
Godrich produced, engineered and curated the music television show From the Basement, which first ran between 2006 and 2009. It features performances from acts including Radiohead, Sonic Youth, the Fall, PJ Harvey, Fleet Foxes, My Morning Jacket, the White Stripes, the Raconteurs, the Red Hot Chili Peppers and Aimee Mann. The series focused on intimate performances without a host or an audience. Godrich said, "I'm really interested to capture some really iconic, bigger names– really the whole point is to get people who are having their moment, to try and get a definitive record of what they're doing." A new series began on YouTube in 2022, featuring acts including Idles, Warpaint and Caribou.

=== The Eraser, In Rainbows and Atoms for Peace ===
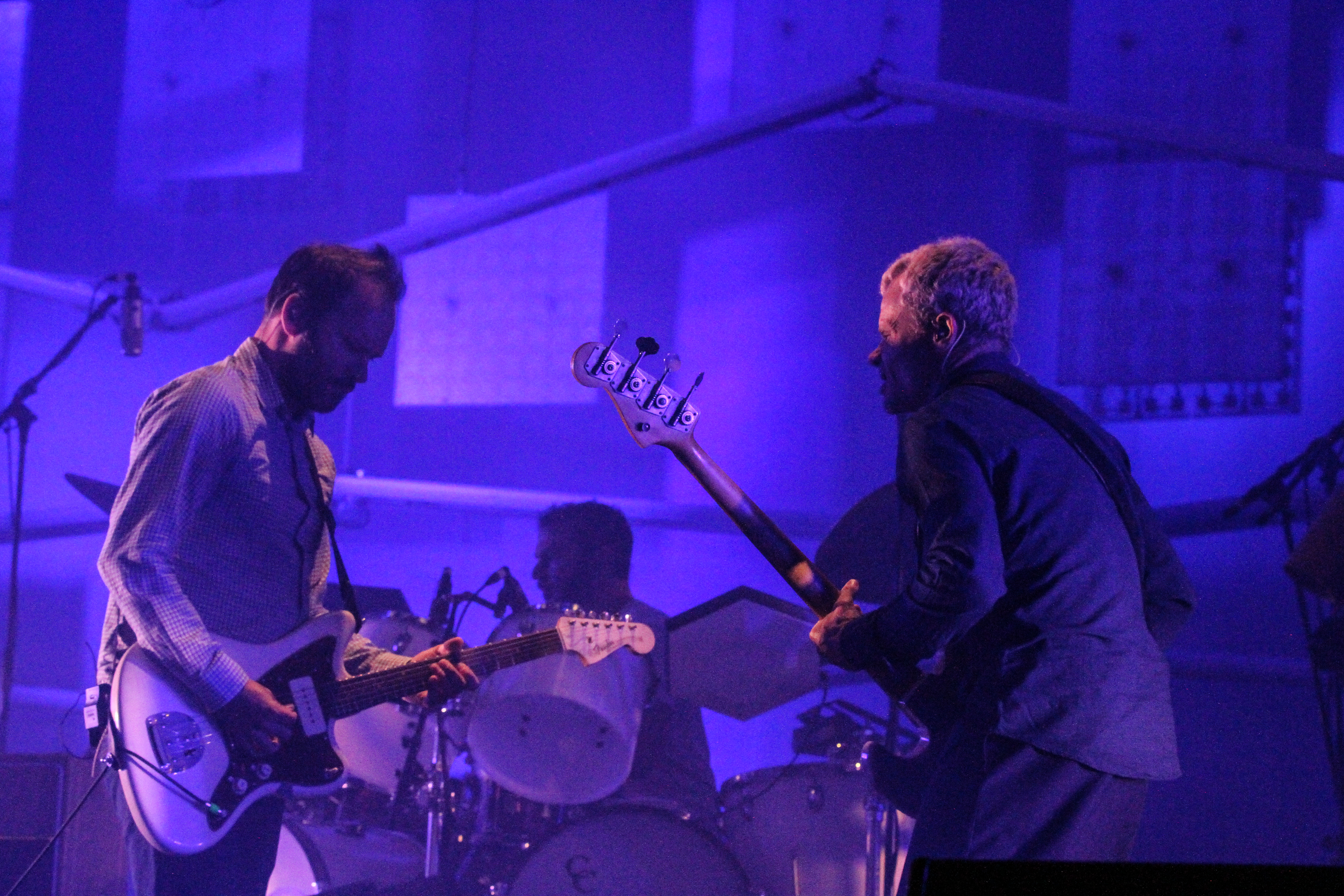
Godrich (left), Joey Waronker (rear) and Flea performing with Atoms for Peace in 2014

Godrich produced The Eraser, the first solo album by the Radiohead singer, Thom Yorke, released in 2006. Godrich said that working with Yorke alone was more straightforward than with Radiohead, as he did not have to manage the relationship between Yorke and the other band members. On The Eraser, he and Yorke were able to "pull in the same direction". Godrich also produced Yorke's albums Tomorrow's Modern Boxes (2014) and Anima (2019).

For their seventh album, In Rainbows (2007), Radiohead initially hired a new producer, Spike Stent. According to the guitarist Ed O'Brien, Radiohead wanted to get out of the "comfort zone" by working with a new producer, and the bassist, Colin Greenwood, said Godrich was busy working with Charlotte Gainsbourg and Beck. Radiohead re-enlisted Godrich after their sessions with Stent proved fruitless. Godrich and Mike Hedges produced the Travis albums The Boy With No Name (2007).

In 2009, to perform songs from The Eraser, Godrich and Yorke formed Atoms for Peace, with Godrich on guitar, keyboards and synthesisers. The band also includes the bassist Flea of the Red Hot Chili Peppers, the drummer Joey Waronker of Beck and R.E.M., and the percussionist Mauro Refosco of Forro in the Dark. Their debut album, Amok, produced by Godrich, was released in 2013, followed by a tour of Europe, the US and Japan.

=== Scott Pilgrim, Ultraísta and Junun ===
In 2010, Godrich and Beck composed the score for Scott Pilgrim vs. the World, Godrich's first film work. In October 2012, Godrich, Waronker and the singer Laura Bettinson released an album as Ultraísta. Godrich produced the 2015 live album Roger Waters: The Wall, and made a cameo as a Stormtrooper in the 2015 film Star Wars: The Force Awakens.

Godrich engineered Junun, a 2015 album by the Radiohead guitarist Jonny Greenwood, the Israeli composer Shye Ben Tzur and the Indian ensemble the Rajasthan Express, recorded at Mehrangarh Fort in Rajasthan, India. Godrich's father died during the recording of Radiohead's ninth album, A Moon Shaped Pool (2016). Godrich wrote: "Making this album was a very intense experience for me. I lost my dad in the process. Hence a large piece of my soul lives here in a good way."

=== Roger Waters and Arcade Fire ===
Godrich mixed the Red Hot Chili Peppers' eleventh studio album, The Getaway (2016). He produced the fifth solo album by Roger Waters, Is This the Life We Really Want?, released in June 2017. Godrich, a fan of Waters' work with Pink Floyd, was critical of Waters' previous solo work and felt his role as producer was to "encourage him, to push him a little bit". Godrich provided sound design for Kid A Mnesia Exhibition (2021), an interactive experience created for the anniversary of Kid A and Amnesiac. During the COVID-19 pandemic, Godrich produced the Arcade Fire album We (2022).

=== The Smile, Idles and Dragonflies ===
Godrich produced A Light for Attracting Attention (2022), the debut album by the Smile, a band comprising Yorke, Greenwood and the drummer Tom Skinner. Godrich mixed Jarak Qaribak, a 2023 album by Greenwood and the Israeli rock musician Dudu Tasaa. Godrich produced the 2024 album Tangk by Idles. Bowen said Godrich taught him how to use tape loops, distortion and delay in new ways to create textures. In July 2026, Godrich launched the band Dragonflies with Dhani Harrison. Their debut album was released that September.

== Approach and influences ==
Godrich credited the producers Phil Thornalley, John Leckie and Steve Lillywhite for teaching him his craft, saying they were "people I watched directly and emulated". He named his "heroes" as the Beatles producer George Martin, for "inventing the job", and the producer Trevor Horn for being "the thing that really made me sit up and listen". He said Joni Mitchell was his favourite artist, citing her "unique combination of musical and lyrical talent".

Godrich said that although he enjoys listening to "clinical" and "shiny" music, he works best creating "organic" sounds: "Making a dark brown soup was more my skill, [rather] than making a big fairy cake." He generally does not approach acts he produces; instead, he waits for them to contact him, as he does not assume he could improve the work of acts he already admires.

Godrich takes differing approaches to mixing and production depending on the project. On Terror Twilight by Pavement, he took a minimalist approach as a mixing engineer and producer, doing much of the mixing work during recording sessions. Conversely, on Radiohead's Kid A and OK Computer and Jason Falkner’s Can You Still Feel? he used dense arrangement and complex mixing and production techniques. He often records at different recording studios and with different equipment according to the needs of the artist.

Godrich records onto reel-to-reel tape, uses tube compression and often records and mixes on SSL consoles. He is influenced by avant-garde and dub production techniques, and frequently uses distortion and pitch manipulation as a mixing tool. He uses high compression on drums to give a "slammed" effect.

Godrich said he believes people place too much emphasis on studio equipment and "trickery", which is less important than musical sensibility and communication. He said: "I get very annoyed with people asking me what my favourite microphone is. It doesn't matter ... One of the reasons why music has become generally worse, and I'm sorry to say that, is that people think about technology more than the actual music they're making." He feels that "the recording process is best when fast, because it's then the smallest obstacle to the actual music".

In 2006, CBC described Godrich's collaboration with Radiohead as "the most adventurous band-producer partnership in modern rock". He has been dubbed the band's "sixth member", an allusion to Beatles producer George Martin being called the "fifth Beatle". Godrich also plays Chieftain Mews, a long-running character who appears in Radiohead's promotional material. Yorke credited Godrich with helping edit his work, identifying which parts need improvement and which have potential. He gave the example of the song "Black Swan", which originally was "a six-minute load of crap, except for this one juicy bit, and [Godrich] goes past and goes, 'That bit. Fuck the rest.' Usually it's something like that."

== Discography ==
Year	Title	Artist	Credits
1990	Scandalo	Gianna Nannini	Assistant engineer
1990	Tune In	The Silent Blue	Engineer, producer
1991	Superstition	Siouxsie and the Banshees	Assistant engineer
1992	Vivienne McKone	Vivienne McKone	Assistant engineer
1993	Buffalo Skinners	Big Country	Assistant engineer
1994	Carnival of Light	Ride	Engineer
1994	Heitor	Heitor	Engineer
1994	My Iron Lung EP	Radiohead	Producer, engineer
1995	The Bends	Radiohead	Engineer, producer ("Black Star")
1995	Feeling Mission	Harvest Ministers	Engineer
1995	Totally	Tee	Engineer
1995	Booth and the Bad Angel	Tim Booth & Angelo Badalamenti	Engineer
1996	English and French	Hopper	Engineer
1996	Sun..!	Sun..!	Engineer
1996	Sound of..McAlmont & Butler	McAlmont & Butler	Engineer, Assistant engineer, Mixing
1997	OK Computer	Radiohead	Balance engineer, recording technician (Producer)
1997	Silver Sun	Silver Sun	Producer, mixing
1997	Plagiarism	Sparks	Engineer
1997	Left of the Middle	Natalie Imbruglia	mixing
1998	Mutations	Beck	Producer, mixing
1998	Sisters in Pain	Jamaica	Engineer
1998	Try Whistling This	Neil Finn	Remixer, mixing
1998	Up	R.E.M.	Mixing
1999	Can You Still Feel?	Jason Falkner	Engineer
1999	The Man Who	Travis	Producer, mixing
1999	Terror Twilight	Pavement	Producer
2000	Kid A	Radiohead	Producer, engineer, mixing
2001	"Walk On"	U2	Remixer
2001	Amnesiac	Radiohead	Producer, engineer
2001	The Invisible Band	Travis	Producer, mixing
2001	Regeneration	The Divine Comedy	Producer
2002	Rouge on Pockmarked Cheeks	Brazzaville	Producer, mixing, String ensemble, Fender Rhodes
2002	Sea Change	Beck	Producer, engineer, mixing, synthesizer, percussion, keyboards
2003	City Reading	Air & Alessandro Baricco	Mixing
2003	Hail to the Thief	Radiohead	Editing, mixing, Operation, Recording, producer
2004	Absent Friends	The Divine Comedy	Mixing
2004	Heroes to Zeros	The Beta Band	Mixing
2004	Talkie Walkie	Air	Producer, engineer, mixing
2004	When It Falls	Zero 7	Guitar, Sounds
2004	"Do They Know It's Christmas?"	Band Aid 20	Producer
2005	Chaos and Creation in the Backyard	Paul McCartney	Producer, piano and Epiphone acoustic guitar loops
2005	Guero	Beck	Mixing
2005	The Roads Don't Love You	Gemma Hayes	Mixing
2006	The Eraser	Thom Yorke	Producer, mixing, musician, arranger
2006	5:55	Charlotte Gainsbourg	Producer, mixing
2006	The Garden	Zero 7	Acoustic guitar, engineer
2006	The Information	Beck	Producer, engineer, mixing, keyboards, Programming, Effects, Scratching, Tambourine, percussion, background vocals, Speak & Spell, whistle, Tote A Tune, Kalimba, drums, Game Boy
2006	Dad's Weird Dream	Silver Sun	Remixing
2007	Pocket Symphony	Air	Producer
2007	The Boy With No Name	Travis	Producer
2007	In Rainbows	Radiohead	Producer, engineer, mixing
2008	Odd Couple	Gnarls Barkley	Engineer, mixing
2010	Turn Ons	The Hotrats	Producer, engineer, mixing, Additional instruments and noises
2011	The King of Limbs	Radiohead	Producer, engineer, mixing
2011	Supercollider / The Butcher	Radiohead	Producer, engineer, mixing
2011	The Daily Mail / Staircase	Radiohead	Producer, engineer, mixing
2012	A Different Ship	Here We Go Magic	Producer
2012	Ultraísta	Ultraísta	Composer, engineer, mixing, producer
2013	AMOK	Atoms For Peace	Producer, Programmer
2014	Warpaint	Warpaint	Mixing
2014	Tomorrow's Modern Boxes	Thom Yorke	Composer, producer
2015	Junun	Shye Ben Tzur, Jonny Greenwood, the Rajasthan Express	Recording, engineer, mixing
2016	A Moon Shaped Pool	Radiohead	Producer
2016	The Getaway	Red Hot Chili Peppers	Mixing
2017	Is This the Life We Really Want?	Roger Waters	Producer, keyboards, guitar, sound collages, arrangements
2019	Anima	Thom Yorke	Composer, producer
2020	Sister	Ultraísta	Composer, engineer, mixing, producer
2022	We	Arcade Fire	Producer
2022	A Light for Attracting Attention	The Smile	Composer, producer
2024	Tangk	Idles	Producer
2025	Lux	Rosalía	Engineer
2026	Ride Lonesome	Beck	Mixing
2026	Dragonflies	Dragonflies	Composer, producer

=== Composition credits ===
Year	Song	Artist	Album
1997	"She"	The Sundays	Static & Silence
2004	"Speed Dial No 2"	Zero 7	When It Falls
2006	"Movie Theme"	Beck	The Information
2006	"Soldier Jane"	Beck	The Information
2006	"The Horrible Fanfare/Landslide/Exoskeleton"	Beck	The Information
2006	"Motorcade"	Beck	The Information
2010	List of composed songs: "Universal Theme"; "Hillcrest Park"; "Fight!"; "Love Me Some Walking"; "Talk To The Fist"; "Rumble"; "Feel The Wrath"; "The Grind"; "Hello Envy"; "Mystery Attacker"; "Second Cup"; "The Vegan"; "Bass Battle"; "Sorry I Guess"; "Roxy"; "The Ninth Circle"; "The Fight Is Over"; "Gideon Calling"; "Level 7"; "Welcome To Chaos Theatre"; "Fast Entrance Into Hell"; "Chau Down"; "Game Over"; "So Alone"; "Round 2"; "A Different Guy"; "Boss Battle"; "Blowing Up Right Now"; "Aftermath"; "Bye And Stuff"	Nigel Godrich	Scott Pilgrim vs. the World (Original Motion Picture Score)
