= Mehrangarh =

Medieval fort in Jodhpur, Rajasthan, India

- Jodhpur, Rajasthan, India
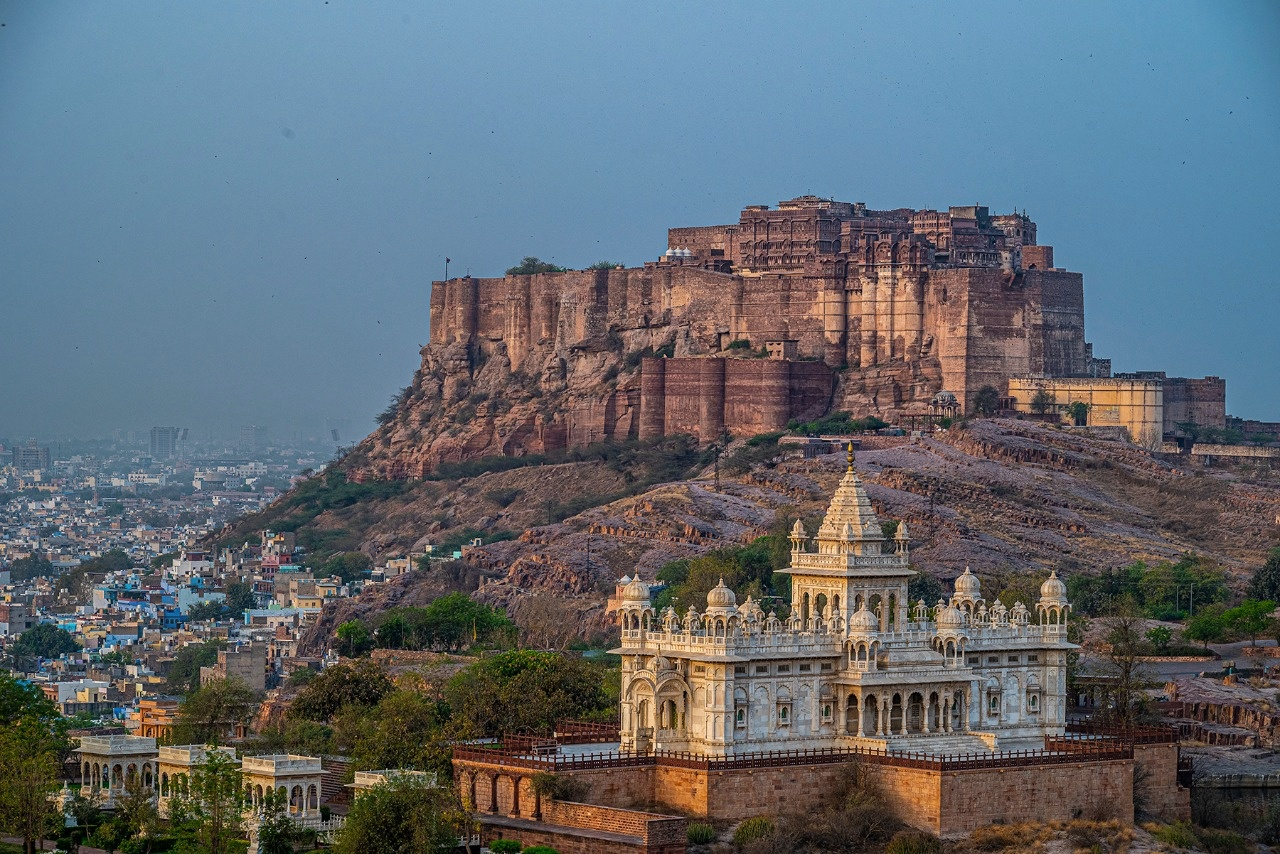
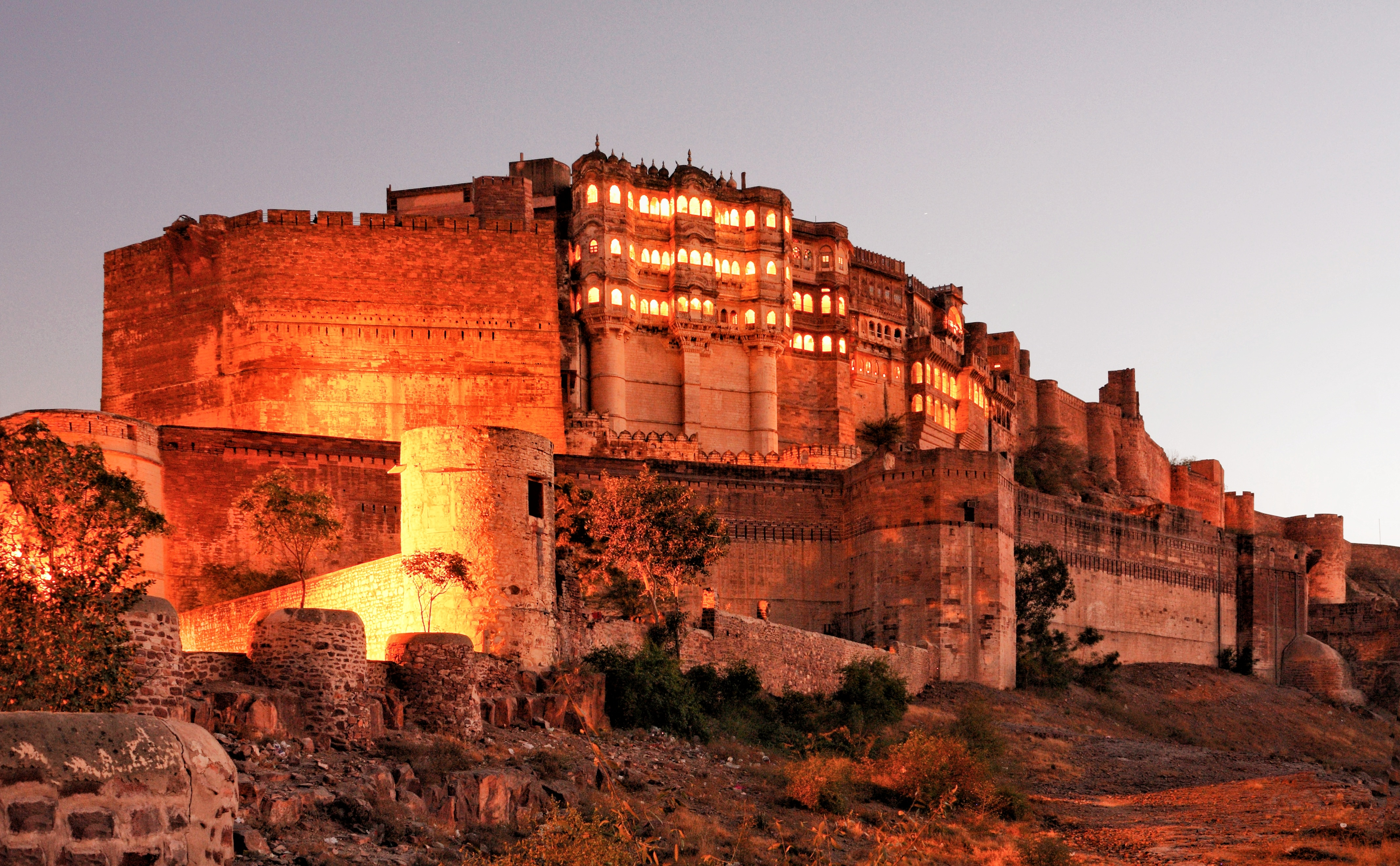
- Top: Day view of the fort Bottom: Night view of the fort

Site information
- Type: Fort
- Controlled by: Mehrangarh Museum Trust
- Open to the public: Yes
- Condition: Well-preserved

Location
- Location within Rajasthan Location within India
- Coordinates: 26°17′53″N 73°01′08″E

Site history
- Built: 1459; 567 years ago
- Built by: Rathore dynasty of Kingdom of Marwar
- Materials: Red Sandstone

Mehrangarh is a historic fort located in Jodhpur, Rajasthan, India. It stands on a hilltop, rising about 122 m (400 ft) above the surrounding plains, and the complex spans 1,200 acres (486 hectares). It was initially built around 1459 by the Rajput ruler of Rathore clan Rao Jodha, though most of the existing structure is from the 17th century built by his successors. The fort has seven gates, including the main entrance, Jai Pol (meaning 'victory gate'), built by Maharaja Man Singh to commemorate his victories over the Jaipur and Bikaner armies in 1806. The Fattehpol (lit. 'victory gate'), commemorates victory of Maharaja Ajit Singh over the Mughals. The English writer and Nobel Prize winner, Rudyard Kipling, described the fort as "a palace that might have been built by Titans and colored by the morning sun."

Within its boundaries are several palaces known for their intricate carvings and expansive courtyards, a Chamunda Mataji Temple, as well as a museum that houses various relics. A winding road leads to and from the city below. The imprints of the impact of cannonballs fired by attacking armies of Jaipur can still be seen on the second gate. At the north-east of the fort is the chhatri of Kirat Singh Sodha, a soldier who fell on the spot defending Mehrangarh.

Some of the notable festivals taking place here include the World Sacred Spirit Festival and Rajasthan International Folk Festival.

== Etymology ==
Mehrangarh's etymology is rooted in the Sanskrit words 'Mihir' (meaning sun) and 'garh' (meaning fort). Phonetically evolving from 'Mihirgarh' to 'Mehrangarh' in Rajasthani language. The fort was named Mihirgarh, meaning ‘fort of the sun’ – a reference to the ruling clan Rathore's mythical descent from the sun god Surya.

== History ==
Rao Jodha, the chief of the Rathore clan, is credited with the origin of Jodhpur in India. He founded Jodhpur in 1459 as the capital of Marwar (Mandore was the previous capital). He was one of Ranmal's 24 sons and became the fifteenth Rathore ruler. One year after his accession to the throne, Jodha decided to move his capital to the safer location of Jodhpur, as the one thousand years old Mandore fort was no longer considered to provide sufficient security. With the trusted aid of Rao Nara (son of Rao Samra), the Mewar forces were subdued at Mandore. With that, Rao Jodha gave Rao Nara the title of Diwan. With the help of Rao Nara, the foundation of the fort was decided on 12 May 1459 by Jodha on a rocky hill 9 kilometres (5.6 mi) to the south of Mandore. This hill was known as Bhakurcheeria, the mountain of birds. According to legend to build the fort he had to displace the hill's sole human occupant, a hermit called Cheeria Nathji, the lord of birds. Cheeria Nathji was a man with the local population as his followers and hence influential in the region. When requested to move he refused categorically. This happened many times. Rao Jodha then took extreme measures and sought help from another more powerful saint, Karni Mata of Deshnoke who was a Hindu warrior sage born in Charan caste. At the request of the king, she came and asked Cheeria Nathji to quit immediately. Seeing a superior power he left at once but cursed Rao Jodha with words "Jodha! May your citadel ever suffer a scarcity of water!". Rao Jodha managed to appease the hermit by building a house and a temple in the fort. Karni Mata laid down the foundation stone of the Mehrangarh Fort. Today only the forts of Bikaner and Jodhpur remain in the hands of Rathores, both had their foundation stones laid by Shri Karni Mata. All other Rajput forts of Rajasthan were abandoned for some or the other reasons by the respective clans. Only the Rathores of Jodhpur and Bikaner have their forts with them till date. This fact is considered a miracle by the local population and is attributed to Shri Karni Mata. Rao Jodha also granted villages of Mathania and Chopasni to the two Charan warlords who were sent by him to request maa Mehaai to come to Jodhpur.

To ensure that the new site proved propitious; he buried a man of the Meghwal caste called "Raja Ram Meghwal", who offered his services voluntarily, alive in the foundations as this was considered auspicious during those days. "Raja Ram Meghwal" was promised that in return his family would be looked after by the Rathores. His family was granted land and to this day his descendants still live in Raj Bag, near Soor Sagar.

Though the fortress was originally started in 1459 by Rao Jodha, founder of Jodhpur, most of the fort which stands today dates from the period of Maharaja Jaswant Singh (1638–78). The fort is located at the centre of the city spreading over 5 kilometres (3.1 mi) on top of a high hill. Its walls, which are up to 36 metres (118 ft) high and 21 metres (69 ft) wide, protect some of the most beautiful and historic palaces in Rajasthan. Khandwaliya community one of the old traditional community had the knowledge of breaking the big stones made this fort with others.

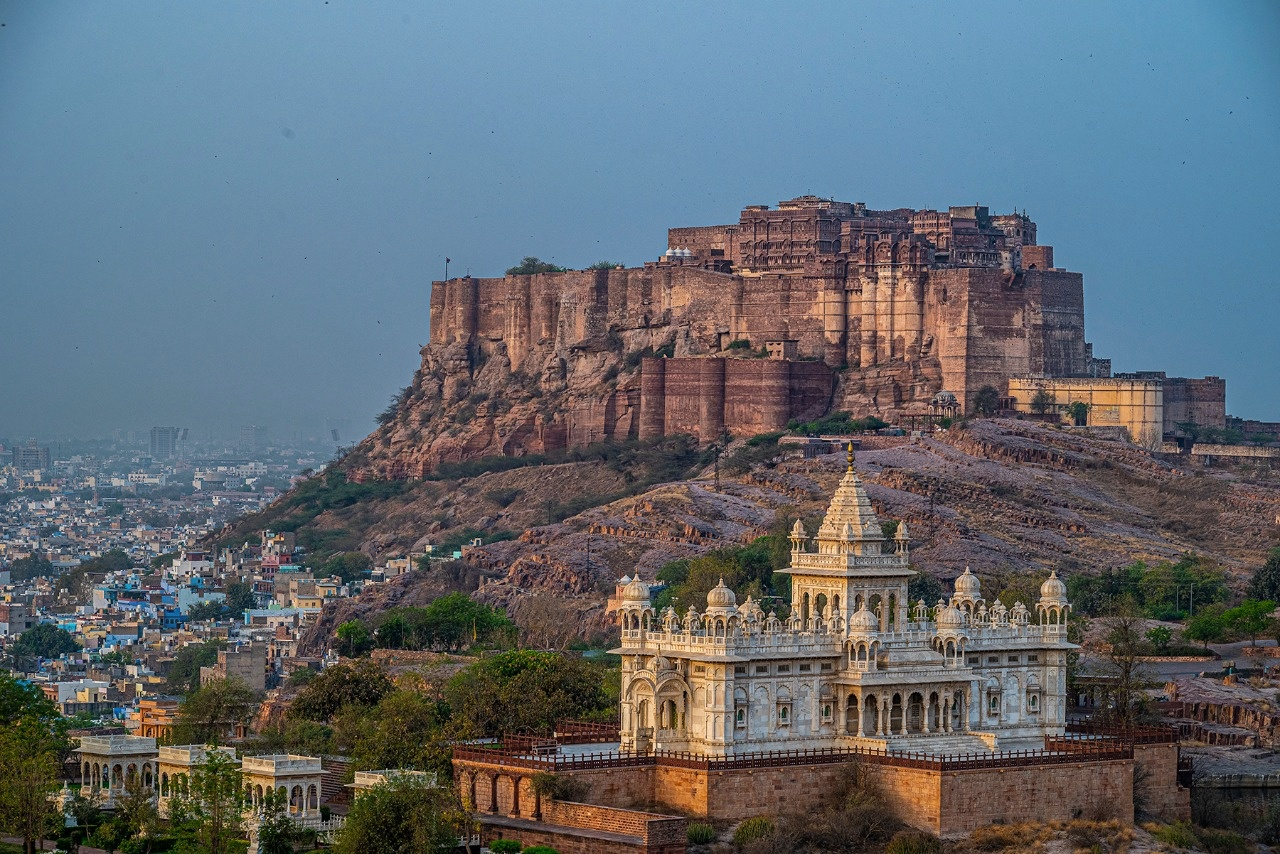
Mehrangarh Fort with the Jaswant Thada in front

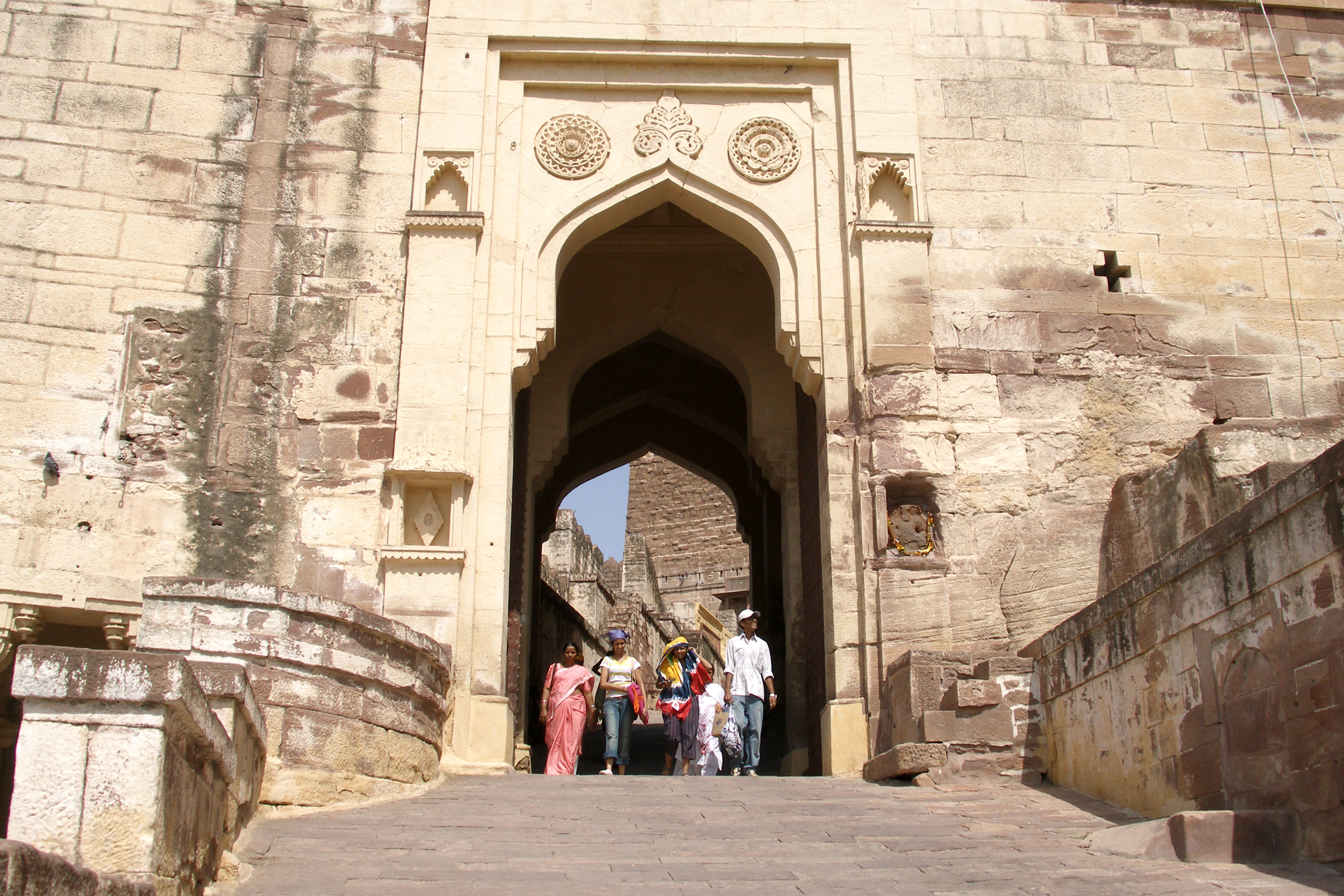
Amruti Pol

Entry to the fort is gained through a series of seven gates. The most famous of the gates are:

- Jai Pol ("Gate of Victory"), built by Maharaja Man Singh in 1806 to celebrate his victory in a war with Jaipur and Bikaner.
- Fateh Pol, built to celebrate a victory over the Mughals in 1707;
- Gopal Pol, it is the second Pol after Fateh Pol.
- Dedh Kangra Pol, which still bears the scars of bombardment by cannonballs;
- Amruti Pol, it is in between Dedh Kangra Pol and Loha Pol.
- Loha Pol, which is the final gate into the main part of the fort complex. Immediately to the left are the handprints (sati marks) of the ranis and some princesses, who had committed Sati over the years after death of their husband.
- Suraj Pol, inner most gate which provides access to palace complex and Daulat Khana Chauk.

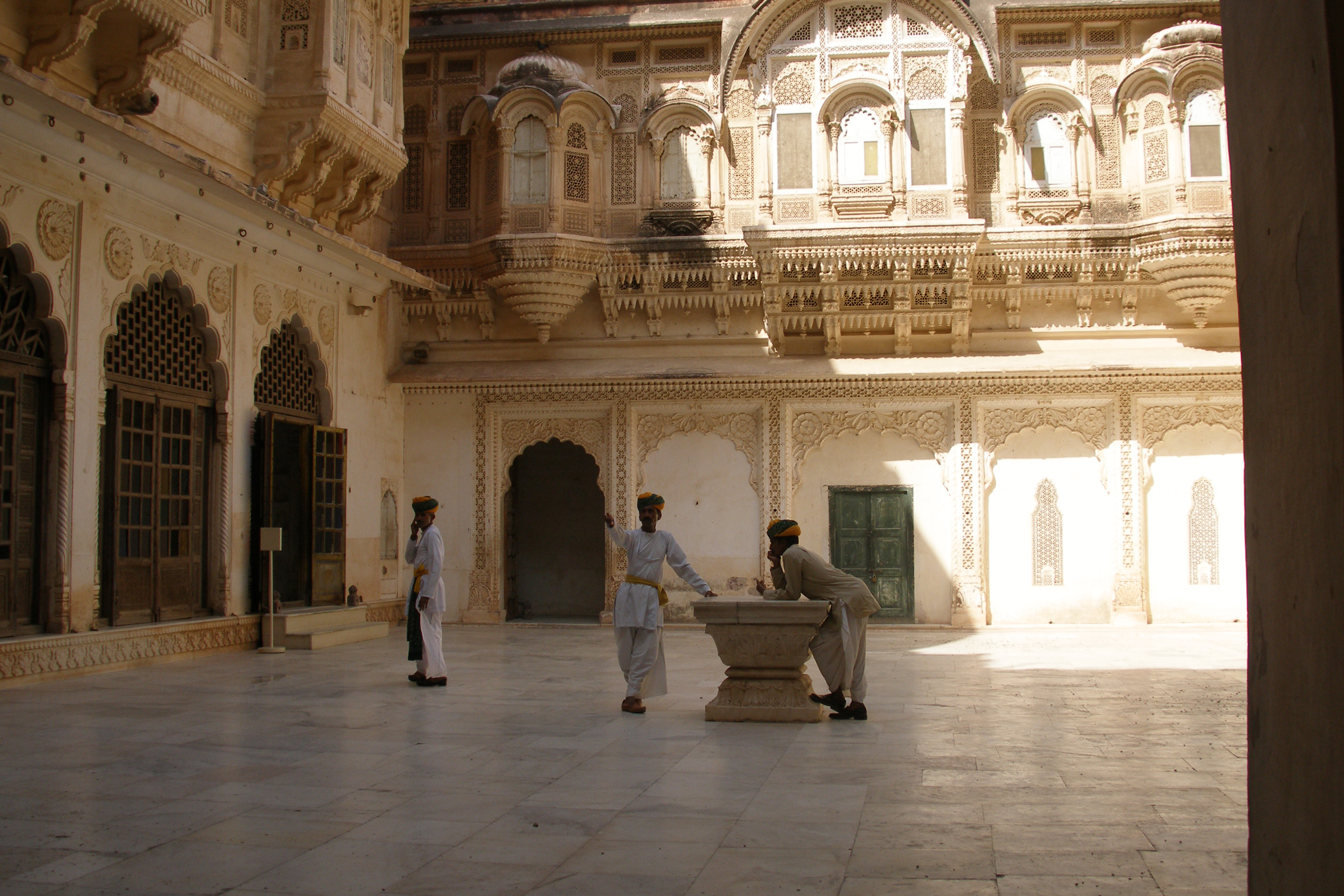
Intricate carvings and expansive courtyards of Mehrangarh palaces

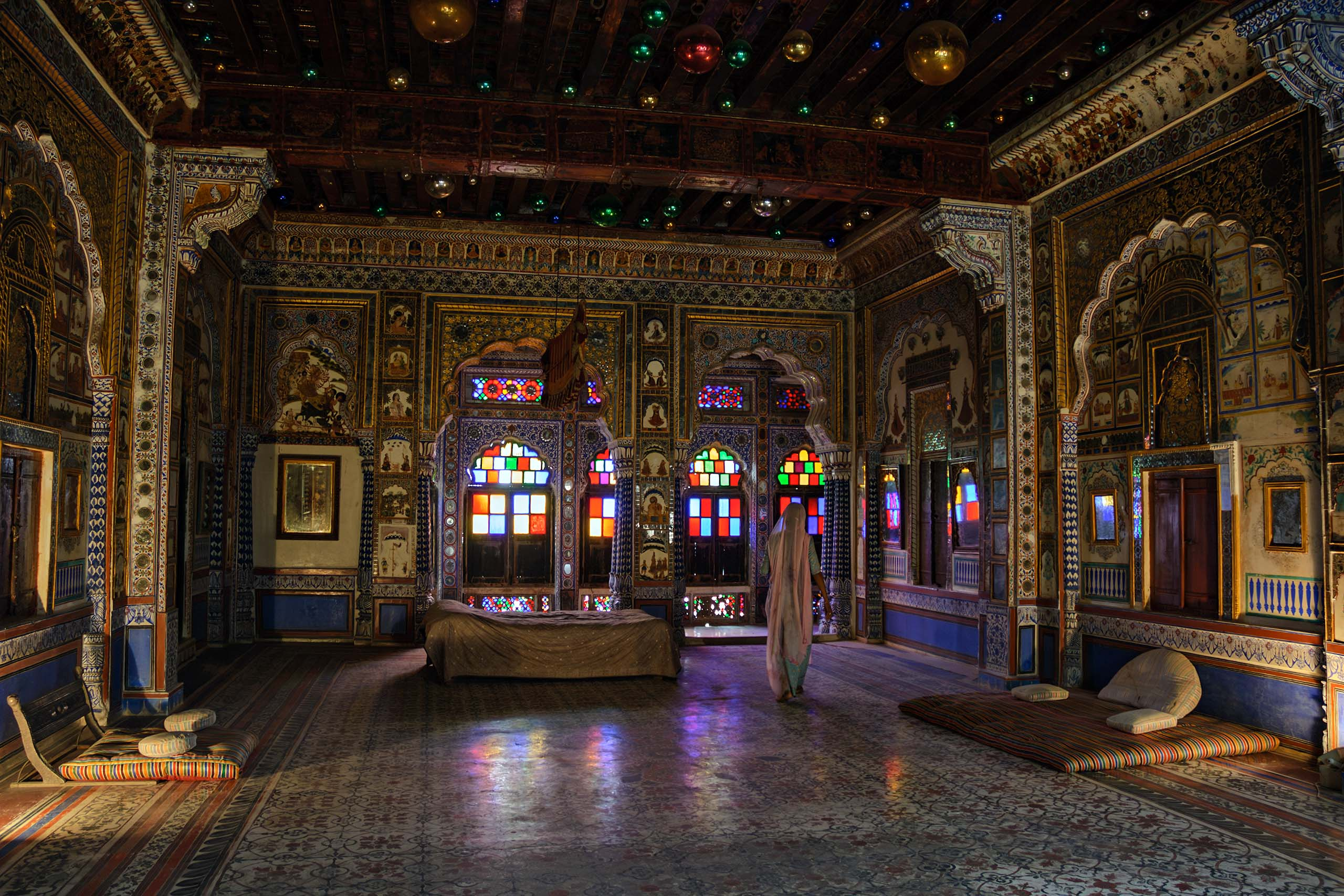
Phool Mahal (Flower Palace) at Mehrangarh Fort

Mehrangarh museum Jhanki Mahal cradle gallery

Within the fort are several decorated palaces. These include, Moti Mahal (Pearl Palace), Phool Mahal (Flower Palace), Sheesha Mahal (Mirror Palace), Sileh Khana and Daulat Khana. The museum houses a collection of palanquins, howdahs, royal cradles, miniatures, musical instruments, costumes, and furniture. The ramparts of the fort house preserved old cannons (including the Kilkila cannon), and provided a view of much of the city.

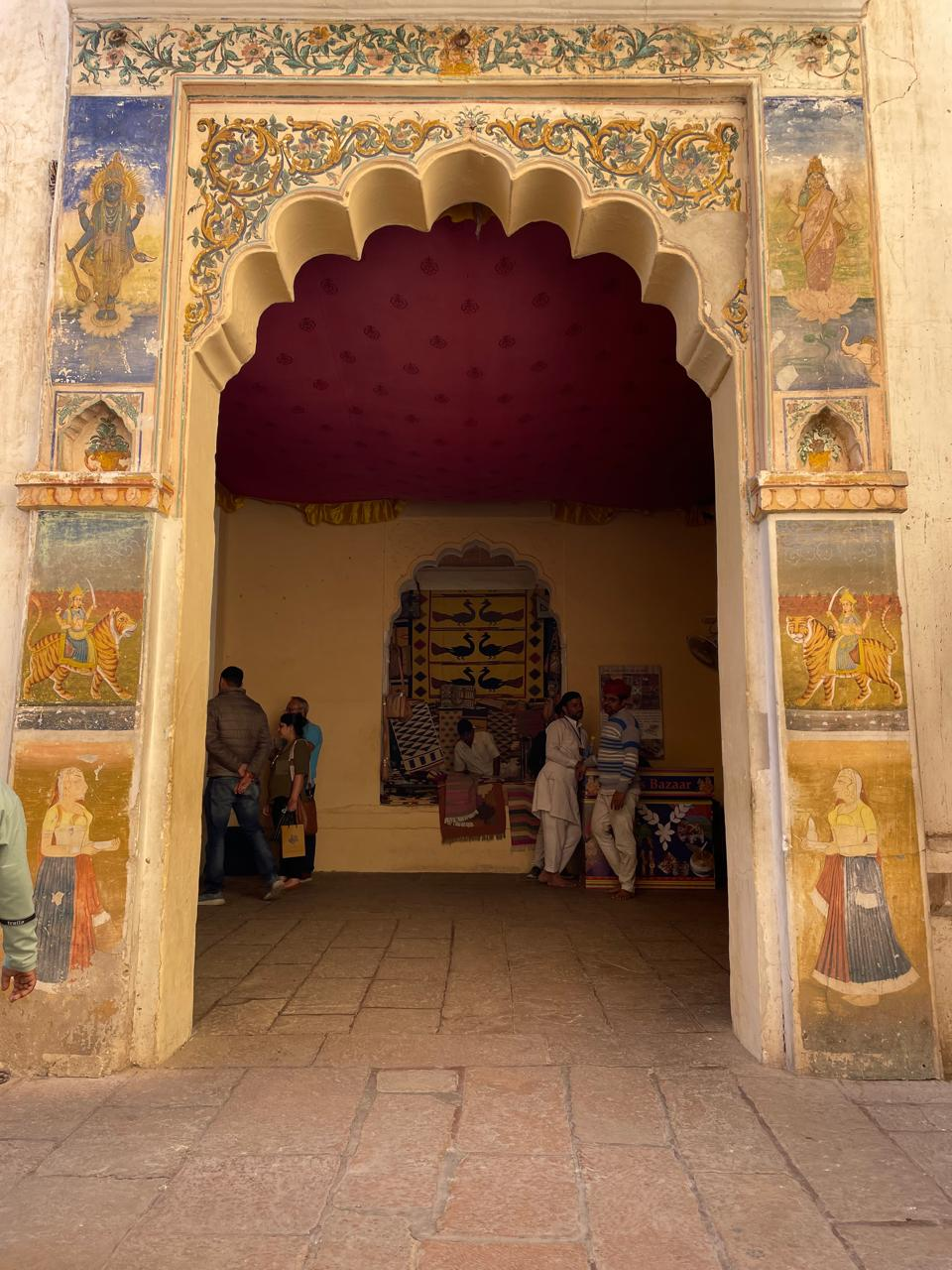
This is the gate to a market inside the Mehrangarh Fort. The wall is adorned with paintings of Gods and Goddesses.

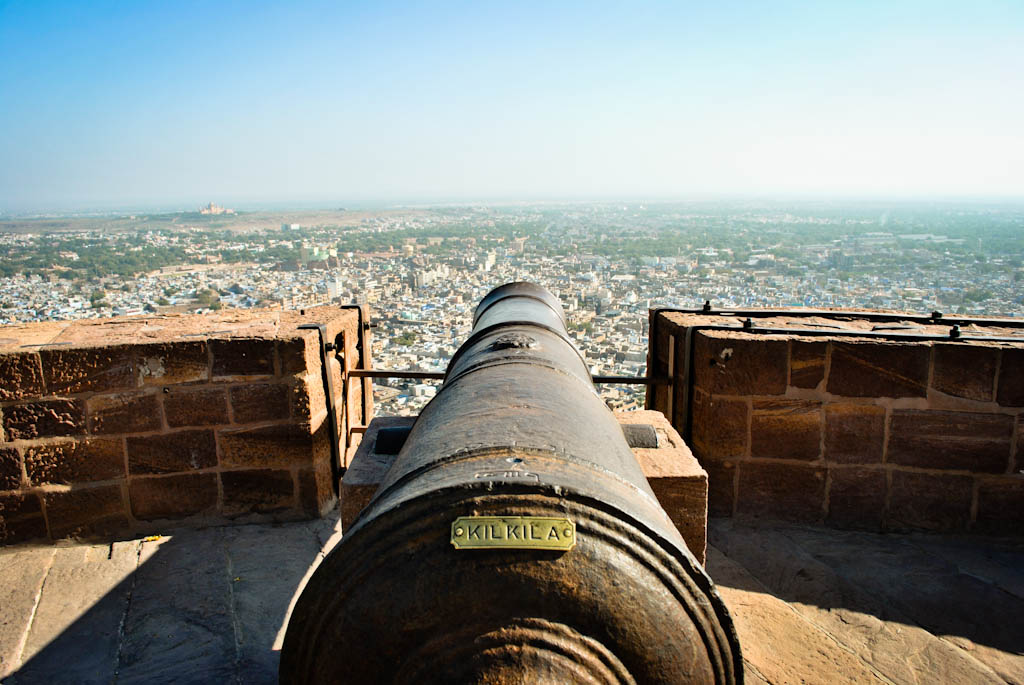
Kilkila cannon

== Galleries at the Mehrangarh Museum ==
=== Elephant's howdahs ===
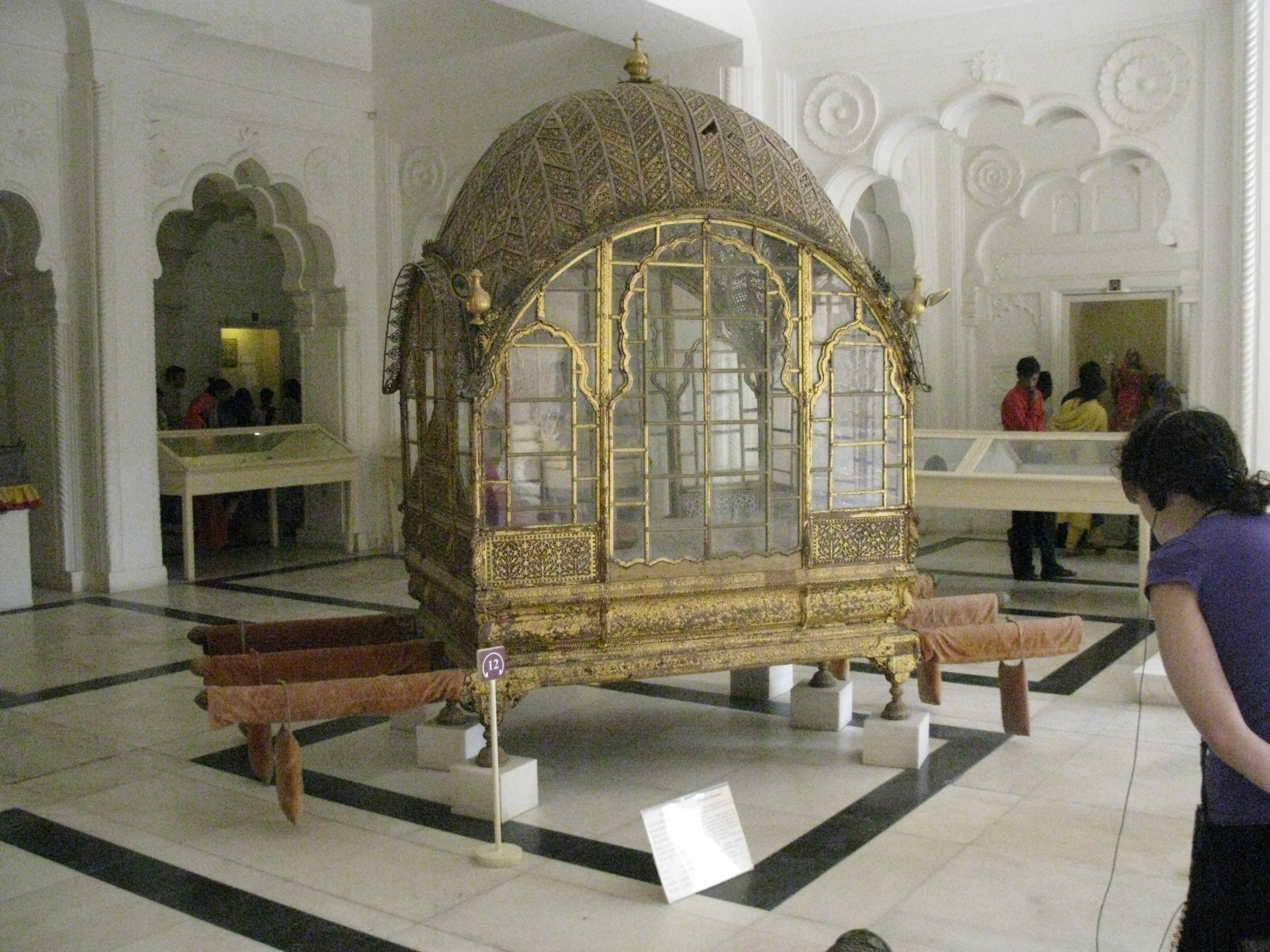
Mahadol, the Palanquin at Mehrangarh Museum

Howdahs were a kind of two-compartment wooden seat (mostly covered with gold and silver embossed sheets), which were fastened onto the elephant's back. The front compartment, with more leg space and a raised protective metal sheet, was meant for kings or royalty, and the rear smaller one for a reliable bodyguard disguised as a fly-whisk attendant.

=== Palanquins ===
Palanquins were a popular means of travel and circumambulation for the ladies of the nobility up to the second quarter of the 20th century. They were also used by male nobility and royals on special occasions.

=== Daulat Khana – Treasures of Mehrangarh Museum ===
This gallery displays one of the most important and best-preserved collections of fine and applied arts of the Mughal period of Indian history, during which the Rathore rulers of Jodhpur maintained close links with the Mughal emperors. It also has the remains of Emperor Akbar.

=== Armory ===
This gallery displays a rare collection of armor from every period in Jodhpur. On display are sword hilts in jade, silver, rhino horn, ivory, shields studded with rubies, emeralds and pearls and guns with gold and silver work on the barrels. The gallery also has on display the personal swords of many emperors, among them outstanding historical piece like the Khaanda of Rao Jodha, weighing over 3 kg, the sword of Akbar and the sword of Timur.

=== Paintings ===
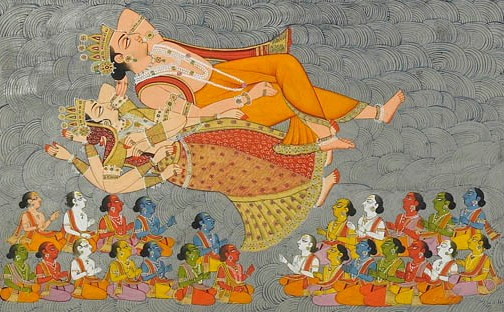
Folio from the Shiva Purana at Mehrangarh Museum, c. 1828.

This gallery displays colours of Marwar-Jodhpur, the finest example of Marwar paintings.

=== The Turban Gallery ===
The Turban Gallery in the Mehrangarh Museum seeks to preserve, document and display the many different types of turbans once prevalent in Rajasthan; every community, region, and festival having had its own headgear.

=== Shahi Lal Dera ===
Shahi Lal Dera or Royal Red Tent is a part of royal collection at the fort.

== Tourist attractions ==
=== National Geological Monument ===
The Jodhpur Group - Malani Igneous Suite Contact on which the Mehrangarh Fort has been built has been declared a National Geological Monument by the Geological Survey of India to encourage Geo Tourism in the country. This unique geological feature is part of the Malani Igenus Suite seen in the Thar desert region, spread over an area of 43,500 km^{2}. This unique geological feature represents the last phase of igneous activity of Precambrian age in the Indian Subcontinent.

=== The Chamunda Mataji Temple ===
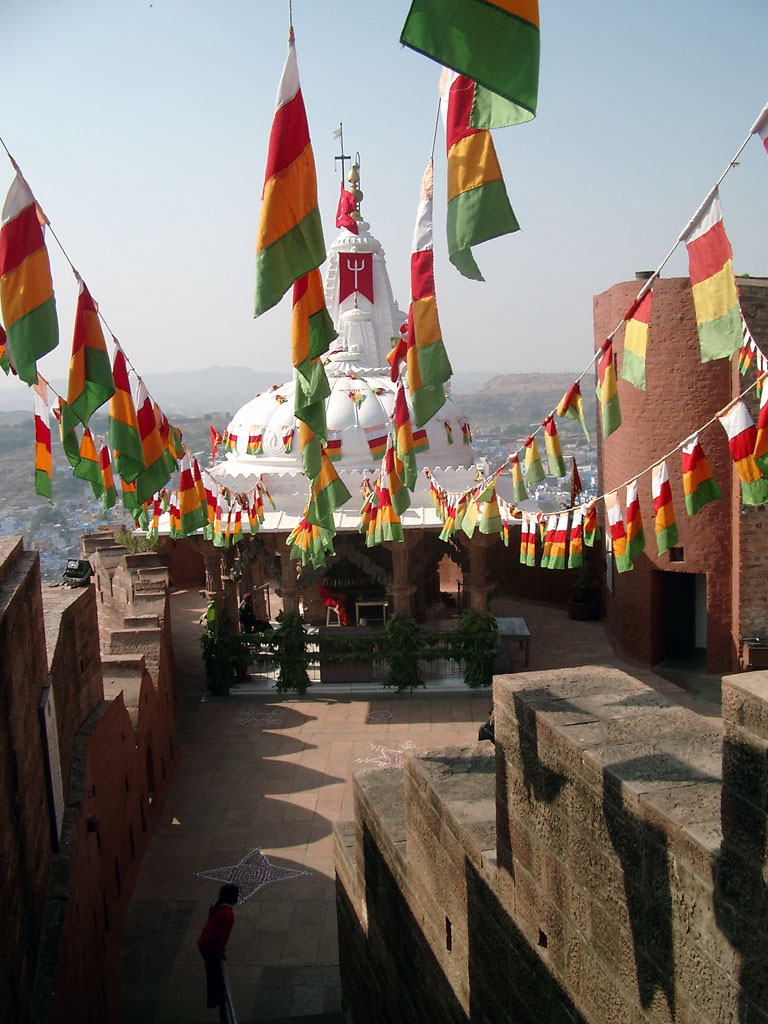
Chamunda Devi Temple

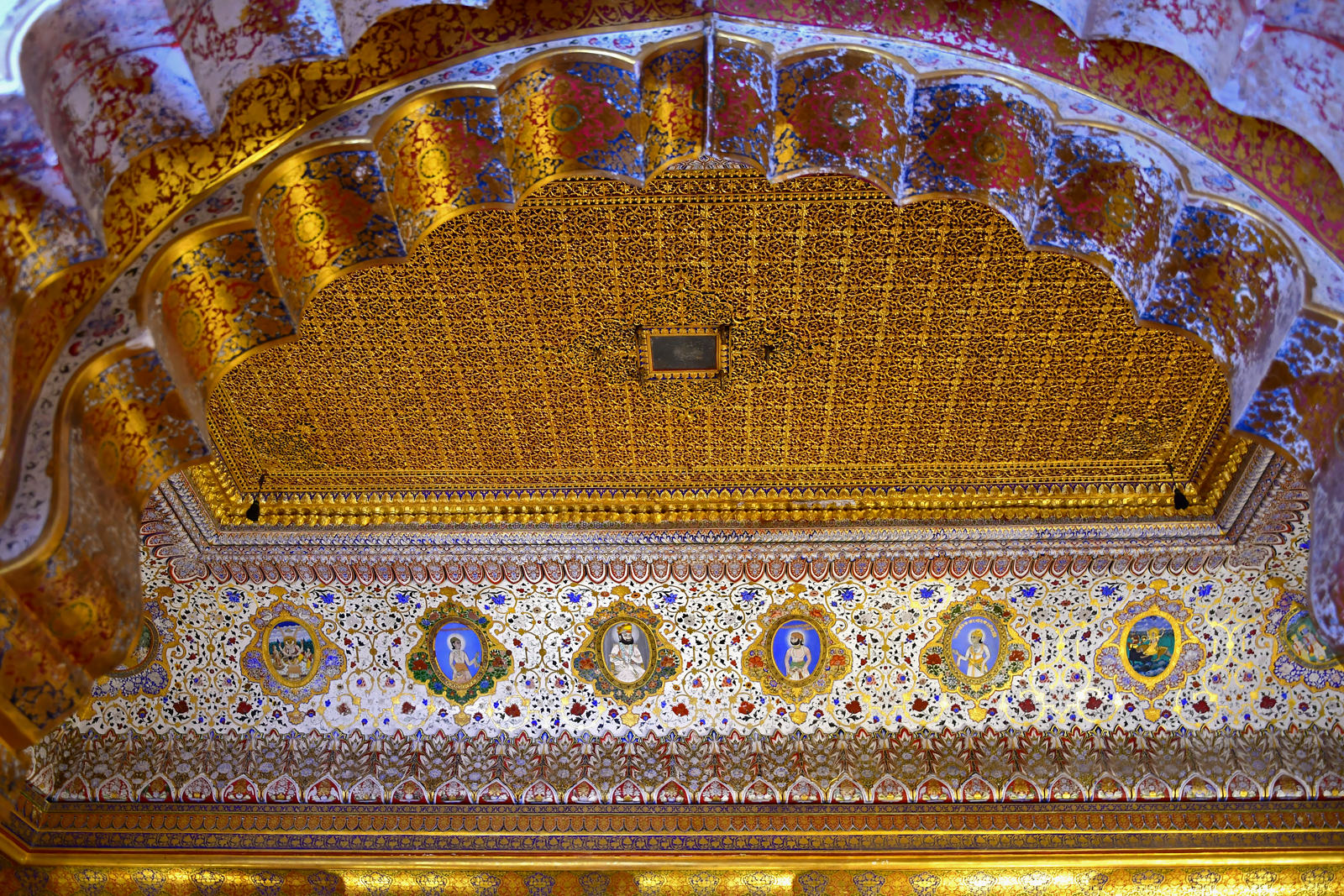
Interior of Mehrangarh Fort

The chamunda Mataji was Rao Jodha's favourite goddess, he brought her idol from the old capital of Mandore in 1460 and installed her in Mehrangarh (Maa chamunda was the kul devi of the Pratihara rulers of Mandore). She remains the Maharaja's and the Royal Family's Isht Devi or adopted goddess and is worshipped by most of Jodhpur's citizens as well. Crowds throng Mehrangarh during the Dussehra celebrations.

=== Rao Jodha Desert Rock Park ===
Rao Jodha Desert Rock Park, spreads over 72 hectares, adjoining Mehrangarh Fort. The park contains ecologically restored desert and arid land vegetation. The park was created in 2006 to try and restore the natural ecology of a large, rocky area adjoining and below the fort and opened to the public in February 2011. The area in and around the park contains distinctive volcanic rock formations such as rhyolite, with welded tuff, and breccia, sandstone formations. The park includes a Visitors Centre with Interpretation Gallery, a native plant nursery, small shop and cafe.

== 2008 stampede ==
A human stampede occurred on 30 September 2008, at the Chamunda Devi temple inside of the Mehrangarh Fort, in which 224 people were killed and more than 400 injured.

== Culture ==
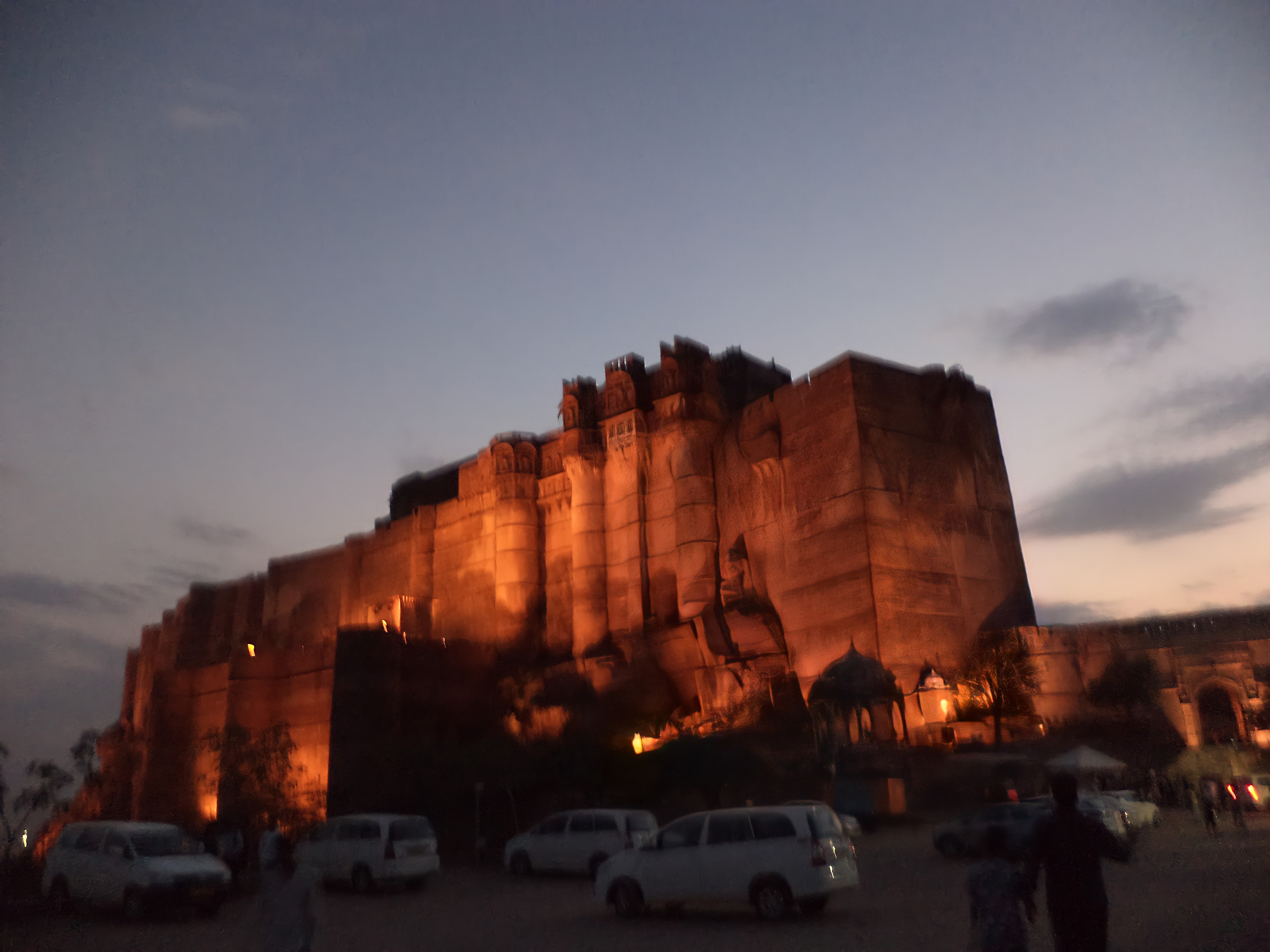
Night view of Mehrangarh Fort

The fort has musicians performing folk music at the entrance and houses museum, restaurants, exhibitions, and craft bazaars. The fort was one of the filming locations for Disney's 1994 live-action film The Jungle Book, as well as the 2012 film The Dark Knight Rises. Principal photography for the latter commenced on 6 May 2011. The Emraan Hashmi starrer Awarapan was also shot here. In 2015, the fort was used to record a collaborative album by musicians including Israeli composer Shye Ben Tzur, English composer and Radiohead guitarist Jonny Greenwood, and Radiohead producer Nigel Godrich. The recording was the subject of a documentary, Junun, by the American director Paul Thomas Anderson. In March 2018, the film crew for the Bollywood film Thugs of Hindostan used the fort as one of its shooting locations; actor Amitabh Bachchan left a reflective post about his experience there on his official blog.
