= Laura Bettinson =

English musician (born 1987)

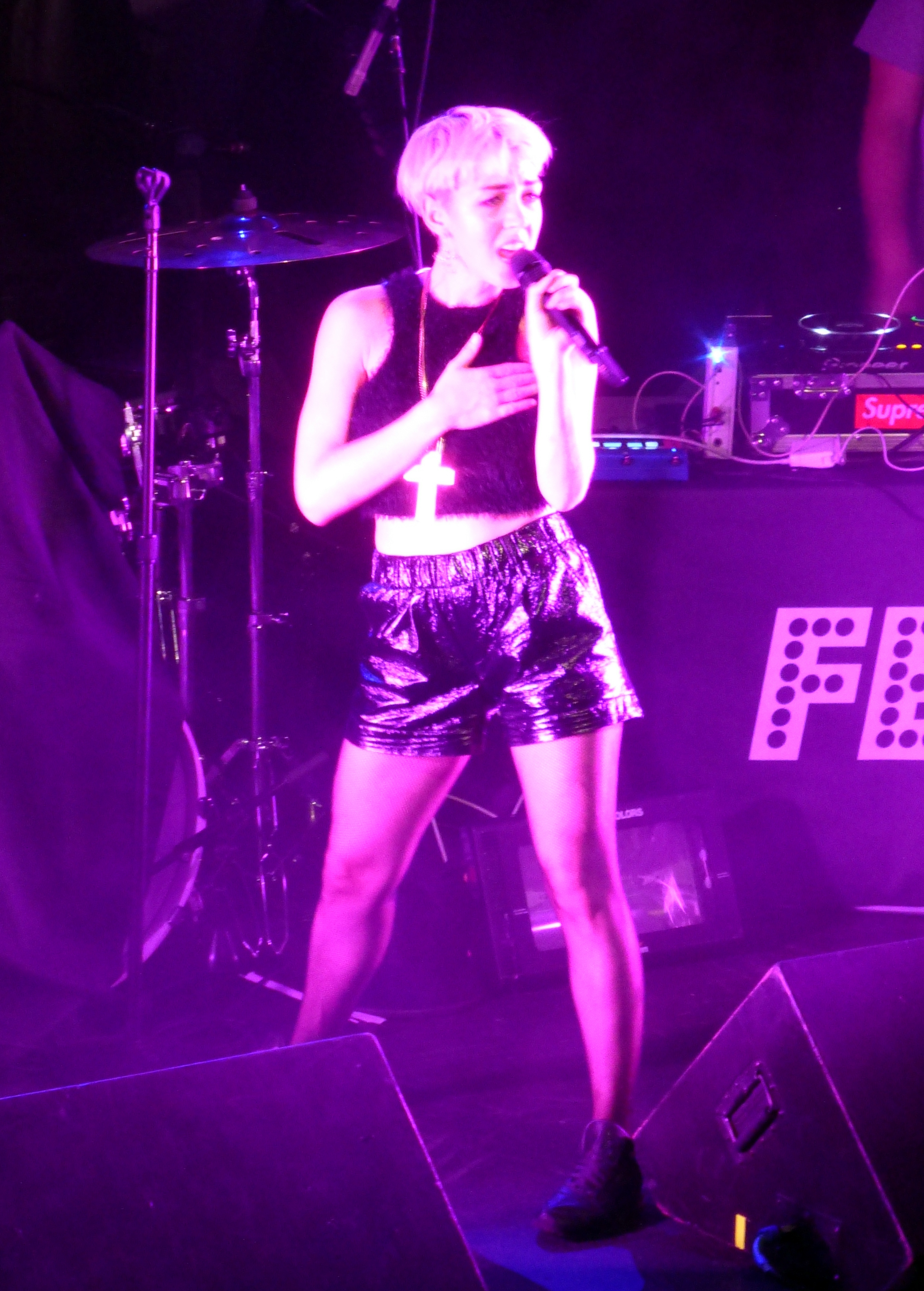
- Bettinson performing in 2014

Background information
- Also known as: Femme, Lau.ra
- Born: 20 September 1987 (age 39); Rugby, Warwickshire, England
- Genres: Alternative dance; electropop; alternative hip hop; wonky pop; indie pop
- Occupations: Singer-songwriter; record producer
- Instruments: Vocals; synthesizer
- Years active: 2008–present
- Member of: Ultraísta

Laura Bettinson (born 20 September 1987), also known by her stage names Femme and Lau.ra, is an English singer, songwriter, producer and DJ. She started writing music at 16, gigging around the Midlands area before moving to London to study Bmus Popular Music at Goldsmiths, University of London.

== History ==
Bettinson grew up in Dunchurch just outside Rugby, Warwickshire, where she attended Rugby High School for Girls. Her father is the West End theatre director and writer Rob Bettinson and her brother is shipping magnate Scott Bettinson. In 2003, aged 16, she won the Coventry and Warwickshire Teen Idol competition.

She started performing as "Dimbleby & Capper" in 2008, under which name she performed on the BBC Introducing stage at Glastonbury Festival in 2009.

It was during this period she met Radiohead producer Nigel Godrich and drummer Joey Waronker, and then went on to front their side project Ultraísta, whose debut self-titled album was released in the UK on 15 October and on 2 October in the US.

In 2013 Bettinson returned to solo work under the pseudonym "Femme", her first single release, consisting of double A side "Educated" and "Double Trouble", was released 22 July 2013 through Tape Rec.

In November 2012 Vogue named her the "Artist of the Week" and in January 2013 Terra listed her as one of "the most interesting women in music right now" alongside such artists as Grimes and M.I.A..

Her second single, also a double A side, "Fever Boy" and "Heartbeat", was released on 25 November 2013 and accompanied with a launch event at the long running White Heat club night at Madame Jojo's, in Soho, London.

Throughout September to October 2014, she joined as an opening act for Charli XCX's Girl Power North America Tour.

== Musical style ==
She has been described as "synth textured and bassy heavy electro-pop".

== Discography ==
Albums and EPs

- Debutante (2016)
- Debutante Remixed (2017)
- 2.0 EP (2018)

=== Singles ===
List of studio singles
Title	Album details
Educated/Double Trouble	Artist: Femme; Released: 22 July 2013; Label: TAPE rec; Formats: CD, digital download
Fever Boy/Heartbeat	Artist: Femme; Released: 25 November 2013; Label: TAPE rec; Formats: CD, digital download, Heart-shaped Gramophone record
High	Artist: Femme; Released: 6 October 2014; Label: TAPE rec; Formats: CD, digital download
S.O.S.	Artist: Femme; Released: 4 May 2015; Label: ZTT Records; Formats: CD, digital download
Gold	Artist: Femme; Released: 13 November 2015; Label: TAPE Music; Formats: CD, digital download, 7" Gold Vinyl
Light Me Up	Artist: Femme; Released: 10 March 2016; Label: TAPE Music; Formats: Promotional Video Only
Fire With Fire	Artist: Femme; Released: 2 June 2017; Label: TAPE Music; Formats: CD, digital download
Angel	Artist: Femme; Released: 27 October 2017; Label: TAPE Music; Formats: digital download
All For You	Artist: Femme; Released: 13 July 2018; Label: Anti-Fragile; Formats: digital download
Be Shy feat. Nova	Artist: Femme; Released: 26 September 2018; Label: Anti-Fragile; Formats: digital download
2.0	Artist: Femme; Released: 14 September 2018; Label: Anti-Fragile; Formats: digital download
What You Gonna Do?	Artist: Femme; Released: 8 March 2019; Label: Wurld Ltd; Formats: digital download
I Just Wanna	Artist: Lau.ra X FromDropTillDawn; Released: 20 September 2019; Label: BMKLTSCH RCRDS; Formats: digital download

== Tours ==
Supporting

- Charli XCX - Girl Power North America Tour (2014)
