= Too Much, Too Little, Too Late (EP) =

EP by Silver Sun
- Released: 8 June 1998
- Recorded: Maison Rouge/Chapel and Eden Studios
- Genre: Power pop
- Length: 7:45 (7"/cass)/12:51 (CD)
- Label: Polydor
- Producer: Al Clay/Silver Sun

Silver Sun chronology
| B Is for Silver Sun (1997) | Too Much, Too Little, Too Late (1998) | Neo Wave (1998) |

Too Much, Too Little, Too Late is a 1998 EP and single by the British power pop band Silver Sun. The title track is a cover of the John Vallins song that was a US No. 1 hit for Johnny Mathis and Deniece Williams. It was the biggest commercial success to date for the band reaching No. 20 on the UK Singles Chart.

The B-side of the single and the two bonus tracks on the CD version are also cover versions: "Xanadu" is originally by Rush, "You Made Me Realise" is by My Bloody Valentine and "I'm a Dick" is originally by the Muffs.

== Track listing ==
7-inch single, cassette

1. "Too Much, Too Little, Too Late" (N.Kipner, J.Vallins) – 3:43
2. "Xanadu" (Geddy Lee, Alex Lifeson, Neil Peart) – 4:02

CD single

1. "Too Much, Too Little, Too Late" (N.Kipner, J.Vallins) – 3:43
2. "Xanadu" (Geddy Lee, Alex Lifeson, Neil Peart) – 4:02
3. "You Made Me Realise" (Kevin Shields) – 3:26
4. "I'm a Dick" (Kim Shattuck) – 1:40

== Personnel ==
- James Broad - lead vocals, electric/acoustic guitar
- Paul Smith - electric guitar, piano
- Richard Kane - bass, electric guitar, percussion, backing vocals, Moog, autoharp
- Richard Sayce - drums, percussion, vocals
- Al Clay - producer
