= Shye Ben Tzur =

Israeli musician

Shye Ben-Tzur שי בן צור
- Born: New York, United States
- Genres: Qawwali
- Occupations: Musician, composer, songwriter
- Website: www.shyebentzur.com

Shye Ben Tzur (Hebrew: שי בן צור) is an Israeli musician who lives in India and Israel. He composes Qawwalis, instrumental and devotional music in Hebrew, Urdu and Hindi. Ben Tzur has been living and creating music in India and Israel for over a decade. He first visited India while searching for a classical Indian music teacher. After years of studying Indian classical music in the traditional manner, Ben Tzur began to compose traditional Sufi Qawwali music in his own language, Hebrew. Qawwali is a form of ecstatic devotional music.

== Biography ==
After attending a concert in Jerusalem by the Indian classical musicians Hariprasad Chaurasia and Zakir Hussain, Ben Tzur became interested in Indian music, which brought him into contact with Qawwali. He went to Ajmer in India (the site of the mausoleum of the Sufi saint Khwaja Moinuddin Hasan Chishti). In 2004, he performed at Jahan-e-Khusrau, an international Sufi music festival held in New Delhi in the spring annually since 2001. Shye Ben Tzur performs around the world with his ensemble.

He worked with Rajasthan Folk musicians communities across India. Shye collaborated with various folk musicians from the Rajasthan desert. Shye collaborated with the famous Indian singer Shubha Mudgal, the Spanish guitar maestro Fernando Pérez, Yossi Fine, Mishko M’ba, Eli Magen, Zohar Fresco and many others.

In 2015, Ben Tzur recorded an album with British guitarist and composer Jonny Greenwood and a group of Indian musicians at the 15th-century Mehrangarh Fort in the Indian state of Rajasthan. The sessions and Greenwood's 2015 India tour were filmed by Paul Thomas Anderson for his documentary Junun. The film premiered at the 2015 New York Film Festival.

== Poetry ==
Shye’s first collection of poems, Bituyeh Nefesh ("Expressions of the Soul") was published in Israel in 1999.

== Discography ==
=== Heeyam ===
His 2003 debut album, Heeyam ("Supreme Love" in Arabic), was recorded in India, Israel and USA. Shye worked with traditional Sufi Qawwali singers, who sang in Hebrew.

=== Shoshan ===
In 2010 Shye’s second album Shoshan ('Rose' in Hebrew) was released. It rated Top 10 in Songlines world music magazine and Top 5 album of the year of non-Bollywood music by Times of India Chennai. Shoshan is a cross-cultural mix of passions, genres and languages.

=== Junun ===
Junun is a 2015 album by Ben Tzur, the English composer and Radiohead guitarist Jonny Greenwood, and the Indian ensemble the Rajasthan Express. It was produced by Greenwood and mixed by Radiohead producer Nigel Godrich. A second album by the group, Ranjha, was released in May 2026.
