= Too Much, Too Little, Too Late =

Single by Johnny Mathis and Deniece Williams

from the album You Light Up My Life
- B-side: "Emotion"
- Released: February 21, 1978
- Recorded: 1977
- Genre: Soul
- Length: 3:00
- Label: Columbia
- Songwriters: John Vallins, Nat Kipner
- Producer: Jack Gold

Johnny Mathis singles chronology
"Yellow Roses On Her Gown" (1976)	"Too Much, Too Little, Too Late" (1978)	"You're All I Need to Get By" (1978)

Deniece Williams singles chronology
"Baby, Baby My Loves All for You" (1978)	"Too Much, Too Little, Too Late" (1978)	"You're All I Need to Get By" (1978)

"Too Much, Too Little, Too Late" is a song performed by singers Johnny Mathis and Deniece Williams, written by Nat Kipner and John Vallins. The single was a comeback of sorts for Mathis, because his last U.S. top 10 hit had been 1963's "What Will Mary Say" and his last U.S. #1 hit had been 1957's "Chances Are."

Released as a single in 1978, it reached #1 on the U.S. Billboard Hot 100 pop chart, Adult Contemporary chart, and R&B chart. It also reached #1 on the Record World Singles Chart, but peaked at #2 on the Cashbox Top 100. Outside the United States, the song peaked at #9 on the Canadian Singles Chart and #3 on the UK Singles Chart.

"Too Much, Too Little, Too Late" was certified gold and silver in the United States and the United Kingdom by the RIAA and the British Phonographic Industry respectively.

Later in 1978, the duo released a follow-up single, "You're All I Need to Get By" (which peaked at #47 on the Hot 100), and a full album of duets, That's What Friends Are For. The success of the duets with Williams prompted Mathis to record duets with a variety of partners including Jane Olivor, Dionne Warwick, Natalie Cole, Gladys Knight and Nana Mouskouri. A compilation album, also called Too Much, Too Little, Too Late, released by Sony Music in 1995, featured the title track among other songs by the Mathis–Williams duo.

== Chart performance ==
=== Weekly charts ===
Chart (1978)	Peak position
Australia (Kent Music Report)	6
Canada Top Singles (RPM)	3
Canada RPM Adult Contemporary	1
Ireland (IRMA)	2
New Zealand (RIANZ)	2
UK Singles (Official Charts)	3
US Billboard Hot 100	1
US Adult Contemporary (Billboard)	1
US Hot R&B/Hip-Hop Songs (Billboard)	1
US Cash Box Top 100	2

=== Year-end charts ===
Chart (1978)	Rank
Australia (Kent Music Report)	47
Canada	25
New Zealand	17
UK Singles Chart	24
US Billboard Hot 100	28
US Cash Box	29

== Silver Sun version ==
English power pop band Silver Sun recorded a cover of the song for their EP of the same name and album Neo Wave. It was also released as a single, reaching number 20 on the UK Singles Chart in 1998.

== See also ==
- List of Hot 100 number-one singles of 1978 (U.S.)
- List of number-one R&B singles of 1978 (U.S.)
- List of number-one adult contemporary singles of 1978 (U.S.)
