= Sun..! =

Sun..! EP

EP by Silver Sun
- Released: 1996
- Genre: Power pop
- Length: 10:22
- Label: Polydor
- Producer: The Boilerhouse Boys

Silver Sun chronology
Sun..! EP (1996)	Silver Sun (1996)

Sun..! is the debut release from the British band Silver Sun. At the time of the release, Sun was also the name of the band, though after finding out there was a German band with the same name, the band were forced to change their name.

== Track listing ==
1. "There Will Never be Another Me" – 2:23
2. "Thickshake" – 3:06
3. "Captain" – 2:28
4. "Top Trumps" – 2:26
