= Ultraísta =

English-American rock band

- Origin: United Kingdom
- Genres: Electronic; experimental rock
- Years active: 2008–present
- Labels: Temporary Residence; Partisan
- Spinoff of: Atoms for Peace
- Members: Nigel Godrich; Joey Waronker; Laura Bettinson
- Website: ultraista.co.uk

Ultraísta is an English-American experimental rock trio, formed in 2008. The band consists of Atoms for Peace members Nigel Godrich and Joey Waronker, alongside Laura Bettinson. The band's self-titled debut album was released on 2 October 2012. The band's biography notes that it was "conceived from a love of afrobeat, electronica, art and inspired by tequila".

== History ==
Initially a collaboration between Nigel Godrich and Joey Waronker, Ultraísta became a three-piece with the addition of Laura Bettinson in 2010. The band's name is taken from the Spanish literary movement ultraism.

The band released their first album in 2012, followed by a remix album. In 2019, the band announced via social media that it would be returning, releasing a deluxe edition of their self-titled debut on 22 November.

They released their first single, "Tin King," from their second album on BBC Radio 6 on 14 January 2020. The album, Sister, released on 13 March 2020.

== Members ==
- Laura Bettinson - vocals, synthesizer
- Nigel Godrich - synthesizer, bass guitar
- Joey Waronker - drums, percussion

== Discography ==
- Ultraísta (2012)
- Sister (2020)
