= List of awards and nominations received by Jonny Greenwood =

Jonny Greenwood awards and nominations
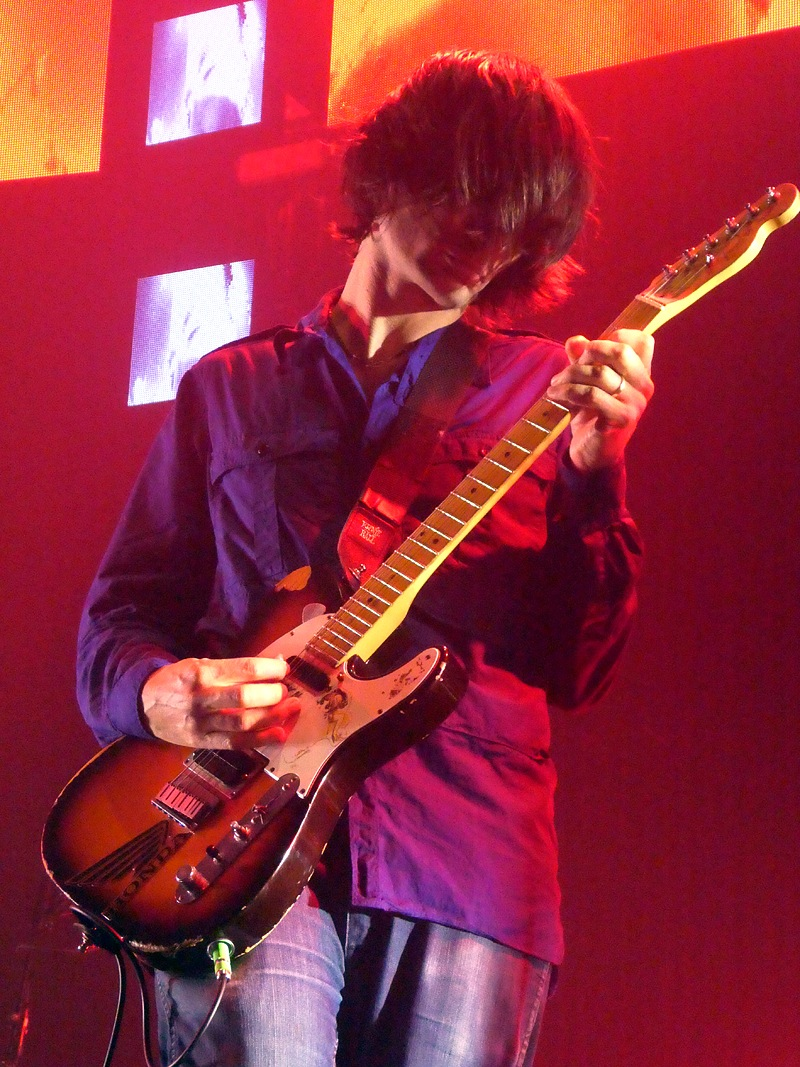
- Greenwood performing with Radiohead in 2016
Award	Wins	Nominations
Totals
Academy Awards	0	3
British Academy Film Awards	0	4
British Independent Film Awards	1	1
Critics' Choice Awards	1	5
Golden Globes	0	3
Grammy Awards	0	2
Hollywood Music in Media Awards	0	1
Ivor Novello Awards	2	4
Satellite Awards	0	3
Various awards and nominations	1	5
Critics associations	13	27
Wins	18
Nominations	58

Jonny Greenwood is an English musician and composer. As a member of the rock band Radiohead, he has received several awards and nominations, including three Grammy Awards, an MTV Video Music Award and seventeen Brit Award nominations. He was inducted into the Rock and Roll Hall of Fame as a member of Radiohead in March 2019.

Greenwood has also received awards and nominations for his work scoring films by directors including Paul Thomas Anderson, and Lynne Ramsay, Pablo Larraín and Jane Campion. His score for Anderson's There Will Be Blood (2007) earned nominations for the BAFTA Award for Best Original Music and the Grammy Award for Best Score Soundtrack for Visual Media and won the Critics' Choice Movie Award for Best Score. For Anderson's Phantom Thread (2018), Greenwood was nominated for the Academy Award for Best Original Score. For his soundtrack for Ramsay's You Were Never Really Here (2017), he received the British Independent Film Award for Best Music. He was nominated for an Academy Award a second time for his soundtrack to The Power of the Dog (2021).

== Academy Awards ==
The Academy Awards are given by the Academy of Motion Picture Arts and Sciences annually for excellence of cinematic achievements.

Year	Category	Nominated work	Result	Ref.
2017	Best Original Score	Phantom Thread	Nominated	
2021	Best Original Score	The Power of the Dog	Nominated	
2025	Best Original Score	One Battle After Another	Nominated	

== British Academy Film Awards ==
The British Academy Film Award is an annual award show presented by the British Academy of Film and Television Arts.

Year	Category	Nominated work	Result	Ref.
2007	Best Original Music	There Will Be Blood	Nominated	
2017	Best Original Music	Phantom Thread	Nominated	
2021	Best Original Music	The Power of the Dog	Nominated	
2025	Best Original Music	One Battle After Another	Nominated	

== British Independent Film Awards ==
The British Independent Film Awards are presented annually to recognize the best in British independent cinema.

Year	Category	Nominated work	Result	Ref.
2018	Best Music	You Were Never Really Here	Won	

== Critics' Choice Awards ==
The Critics' Choice Awards are presented annually since 1995 by the Critics Choice Association for outstanding achievements in the cinema industry.

Year	Category	Nominated work	Result	Ref.
2008	Best Score	There Will Be Blood	Won	
2013	Best Score	The Master	Nominated	
2018	Best Score	Phantom Thread	Nominated	
2022	Best Score	Spencer	Nominated	
2022	Best Score	The Power of the Dog	Nominated	
2026	Best Score	One Battle After Another	Nominated	

== Golden Globes ==
The Golden Globes are presented annually for excellence in film and television, both domestic and foreign, by the Golden Globe Foundation.

Year	Category	Nominated work	Result	Ref.
2017	Best Original Score	Phantom Thread	Nominated	
2021	Best Original Score	The Power of the Dog	Nominated	
2025	Best Original Score	One Battle After Another	Nominated	

== Grammy Awards ==
The Grammy Award is an annual award show presented by The Recording Academy.

Year	Category	Nominated work	Result	Ref.
2009	Best Score Soundtrack for Visual Media	There Will Be Blood	Nominated	
2023	Best Score Soundtrack for Visual Media	The Power of the Dog	Nominated	
2027	Best Score Soundtrack for Visual Media	One Battle After Another	Pending	

== Hollywood Music in Media Awards ==
The Hollywood Music in Media Awards (HMMA) in an organization that honours the best in original music for media.

Year	Category	Nominated work	Result	Ref.
2021	Best Original Score in a Feature Film	The Power of the Dog	Nominated	

== Ivor Novello Awards ==
The Ivor Novello Awards are given by the Ivors Academy to recognize the best in songwriting and composing.

Year	Category	Nominated work	Result	Ref.
2009	Best Original Film Score	There Will Be Blood	Won	
2012	Best Original Film Score	We Need to Talk About Kevin	Nominated	
2019	Best Original Film Score	Phantom Thread	Won	
2022	Best Original Film Score	Spencer	Nominated	

== Satellite Awards ==
The Satellite Awards are a set of annual awards given by the International Press Academy.

Year	Category	Nominated work	Result	Ref.
2012	Best Original Score	The Master	Nominated	
2021	Best Original Score	The Power of Dog	Nominated	
2021	Best Original Score	Spencer	Nominated	

== Various awards and nominations ==
Year	Association	Category	Nominated work	Result	Ref.
2006	World Soundtrack Awards	Best Original Song Written Directly for a Film	"Magic Works" (from Harry Potter and the Goblet of Fire)	Nominated	
2007	Saturn Awards	Best Music	There Will Be Blood	Nominated	
2008	Berlin International Film Festival	Outstanding Artistic Contribution	There Will Be Blood	Won	
2022	Society of Composers & Lyricists	Outstanding Original Score for a Studio Film	The Power of the Dog	Nominated	
2022	Society of Composers & Lyricists	Outstanding Original Score for an Independent Film	Spencer	Nominated	
2022	World Soundtrack Awards	Film Composer of the Year	The Power of the Dog / Spencer	Won	
2026	Society of Composers & Lyricists	Outstanding Original Score for a Studio Film	One Battle After Another	Nominated	

== Critics associations ==
Year	Association	Category	Nominated work	Result	Ref.
2007	Austin Film Critics Association Awards	Best Score	There Will Be Blood	Won	
2007	Chicago Film Critics Association Awards	Best Original Score	There Will Be Blood	Nominated	
2007	Houston Film Critics Society Awards	Best Original Score	There Will Be Blood	Nominated	
2007	Los Angeles Film Critics Association Awards	Best Music	There Will Be Blood	Runner-up	
2007	Online Film Critics Society Awards	Best Original Score	There Will Be Blood	Won	
2012	Chicago Film Critics Association Awards	Best Original Score	The Master	Won	
2012	Houston Film Critics Society Awards	Best Original Score	The Master	Nominated	
2012	Los Angeles Film Critics Association Awards	Best Music Score	The Master	Runner-up	
2012	San Diego Film Critics Society Awards	Best Score	The Master	Won	
2012	Washington D.C. Area Film Critics Association Awards	Best Score	The Master	Nominated	
2014	Los Angeles Film Critics Association Awards	Best Music	Inherent Vice	Won	
2014	Boston Society of Film Critics Awards	Best Use of Music in a Film	Inherent Vice	Won	
2017	Austin Film Critics Association Awards	Best Score	Phantom Thread	Nominated	
2017	Boston Society of Film Critics Awards	Best Use of Music in a Film	Phantom Thread	Won	
2017	Chicago Film Critics Association Awards	Best Original Score	Phantom Thread	Won	
2017	Florida Film Critics Circle Awards	Best Score	Phantom Thread	Nominated	
2017	Los Angeles Film Critics Association Awards	Best Music	Phantom Thread	Won	
2018	Boston Society of Film Critics Awards	Best Use of Music in a Film	You Were Never Really Here	Runner-up	
2018	Chicago Film Critics Association Awards	Best Original Score	You Were Never Really Here	Nominated	
2018	Florida Film Critics Circle Awards	Best Score	You Were Never Really Here	Nominated	
2021	Philadelphia Film Critics Awards	Best Score/Soundtrack	The Power of the Dog	Won	
2021	Washington D.C. Area Film Critics Association Awards	Best Score	The Power of the Dog	Nominated	
2021	St. Louis Film Critics Association Awards	Best Music Score	The Power of the Dog	Nominated	
2021	Dallas–Fort Worth Film Critics Association Awards	Best Musical Score	The Power of the Dog	Runner-up	
2021	London Film Critics Circle Awards	Technical Achievement Award	The Power of the Dog	Nominated	
2021	Houston Film Critics Society Awards	Best Original Score	The Power of the Dog	Nominated	
2021	San Francisco Bay Area Film Critics Circle Awards	Best Original Score	The Power of the Dog	Won	
2021	Austin Film Critics Association Awards	Best Original Score	The Power of the Dog	Nominated	
2021	Seattle Film Critics Society Awards	Best Original Score	The Power of the Dog	Nominated	
2021	Florida Film Critics Circle Awards	Best Score	The Power of the Dog	Runner-up	
2021	Chicago Film Critics Association Awards	Best Original Score	The Power of the Dog	Won	
2021	Washington D.C. Area Film Critics Association Awards	Best Score	Spencer	Nominated	
2021	Boston Society of Film Critics Awards	Best Original Score	Spencer	Won	
2021	St. Louis Film Critics Association Awards	Best Music Score	Spencer	Nominated	
2021	Chicago Film Critics Association Awards	Best Original Score	Spencer	Nominated	
2021	Houston Film Critics Society Awards	Best Original Score	Spencer	Nominated	
2021	San Francisco Bay Area Film Critics Circle Awards	Best Original Score	Spencer	Nominated	
2021	Austin Film Critics Association Awards	Best Original Score	Spencer	Nominated	
2021	Seattle Film Critics Society Awards	Best Original Score	Spencer	Nominated	
2021	Los Angeles Film Critics Association Awards	Best Music	The Power of the Dog / Spencer	Runner-up	
