= There Will Be Blood (disambiguation) =

There Will Be Blood is a 2007 American epic period drama film. It may also refer to:

- There Will Be Blood (soundtrack), the soundtrack to the film
- "There Will Be Blood", an episode from season six of the TV series The Flash
- "There Will Be Blood", the penultimate episode of season seven of the TV series Supernatural
- "There Will Be Blood", a song by German singer Kim Petras, appearing on her 2019 album Turn Off the Light
- "There Will Be Blood", a song by Canadian rock band Sum 41, appearing on their 2016 album 13 Voices
