= 2007 Mojo Awards =

British music awards ceremony

The 2007 Mojo honours list winners were announced at a ceremony at The Brewery in London, England on 18 June 2007.

== Nominees ==
Complete list of nominees (winners in bold):

- Album of the Year
  - Amy Winehouse - Back to Black
  - Bob Dylan - Modern Times
  - **The Good, the Bad & the Queen - The Good, the Bad & the Queen**
  - Grinderman - Grinderman
  - Midlake - The Trials of Van Occupanther
- Song of the Year
  - **Amy Winehouse - "Rehab"**
  - Arctic Monkeys - "Brianstorm"
  - The Gossip - "Standing in the Way of Control"
  - Guillemots - "Made-Up Lovesong 43"
  - The View - "Same Jeans"
- Best Live Act
  - Amy Winehouse
  - **Arcade Fire**
  - Arctic Monkeys
  - The Stooges
  - The Who
- Breakthrough Act
  - The Hold Steady
  - Joanna Newsom
  - Midlake
  - **Seasick Steve**
  - The View
- Catalogue Release
  - Gram Parsons - The Complete Reprise Sessions
  - Fairport Convention - Live at the BBC
  - Various - Forever Changing: The Golden Age of Elektra Records 1963-1973
  - Johnny Cash - At San Quentin
  - Karen Dalton - In My Own Time
  - **Various - The Complete Motown Singles Vol 6. 1966**
- Classic Album Award:
  - **Exodus by Bob Marley**
- Compilation of the Year
  - Change is Gonna Come: The Voice of Black America 1963-1973
  - Jonny Greenwood is the Controller
  - Rough Trade Shops: Counterculture 1976
  - Soul Gospel Volume 2
  - **White Bicycles: Making Music in the 1960s - The Joe Boyd Story**
- Vision Award
  - Nirvana - Live! Tonight! Sold Out!!
  - **Slade - Slade in Flame**
  - Ronnie Lane - The Passing Show - The Life And Music of Ronnie Lane
  - Gorillaz - Phase Two: Slowboat to Hades
  - T. Rex - T. Rex On TV
  - Townes Van Zandt - Be Here to Love Me
- Cult Hero
  - **The Only Ones**
- Hall of Fame Award
  - **The Doors**
- Hero Award
  - **Alice Cooper**
- Icon Award
  - **Ozzy Osbourne**
- Innovation in Sound Award
  - **Suicide**
- Inspiration Award
  - **Björk**
- Legend Award
  - **Ike Turner**
- Les Paul Award
  - **Peter Green**
- Lifetime Achievement Award
  - **The Stooges**
- Maverick Award
  - **Echo & the Bunnymen**
- The Mojo Medal
  - **Jac Holzman of Elektra Records**
- Outstanding Contribution
  - **Joy Division**
