= Polymorphia =

Landmark musical work by Penderecki

- Music for string orchestra by Krzysztof Penderecki
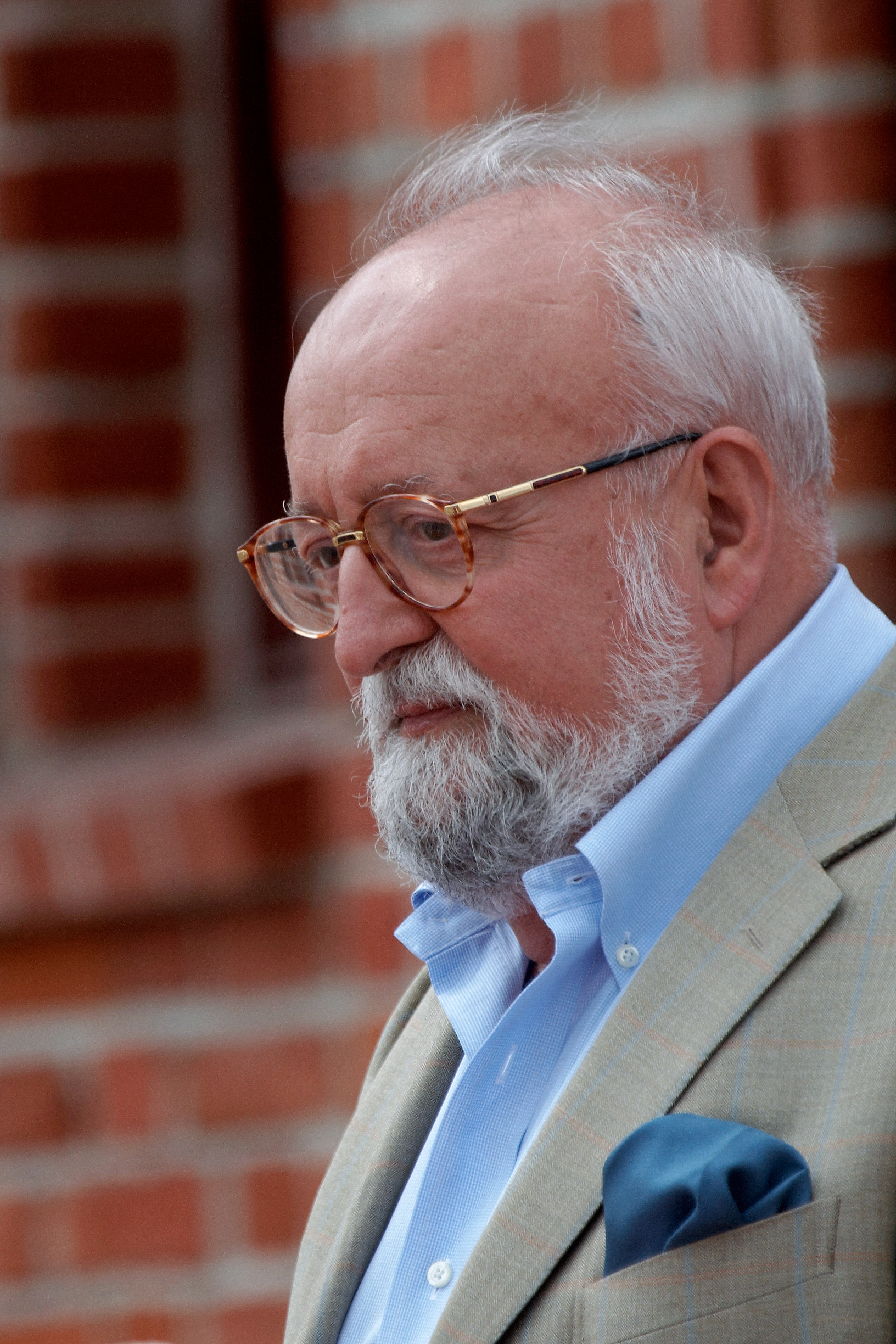
- The composer in 2008
- Composed: 1961
- Dedication: Hermann Moeck
- Performed: 16 April 1962
- Scoring: string orchestra

Polymorphia (Many forms) is a composition for 48 string instruments (24 violins and 8 each of violas, cellos and basses) composed by the Polish composer Krzysztof Penderecki in 1961. The piece was commissioned by the North German Radio Hamburg. It premiered on 16 April 1962 by the radio orchestra and was conducted by Andrzej Markowski. Polymorphia is dedicated to Hermann Moeck, the first of Penderecki’s editors in the West.

At the end of the 1950s and in the early 1960s, in Penderecki's post student years, he sought out new sonic and technical possibilities of instruments, particularly for strings, by unconventional means of articulation and peculiar treatment of sound-pitch. In doing so, Penderecki abandoned the traditional notation system and invented his own graphic notation, which was inspired by electroencephalograms. His earlier composition, Threnody to the Victims of Hiroshima (1960), received the first success of this type of work. Polymorphia was composed soon afterward as a result of his continuation with such experimental innovation.

In Greek, poly means "many" and morph means "shape" or "form" (from the Greek morphe), therefore Polymorphia can be understood as “many shapes or forms.” Polymorphia literally means “the same meaning in many different forms.” The “forms” here do not refer to musical forms but sound effects. Penderecki’s biographer Wolfram Schwinger associates the title Polymorphia, with “the broadly deployed scale of sound...the exchange and simultaneous penetration of sound and noise, the contrast and interflow of soft and hard sounds.” Similar to Threnody to the Victims of Hiroshima, Penderecki constructed the piece by sound events. Instead of “melody”, dense clusters, microtones and glissandi are heard. The dissonant sonorist piece ends with a C major triad.

== Penderecki's timbre system ==
The period of compositional output in which Penderecki’s Polymorphia was composed is known as his sonoristic period, during which he used a method of composing based on timbre organization. This timbre organization was based on the simple explanation that the process of generating the acoustic wave is simply the “collision of two physical bodies, one being a sound source, the other being the body that vibrates the sound source.” Penderecki most likely derived his timbre organization from the teaching of Mieczyslaw Drobner, a Polish acoustician and organologist who in 1958 obtained the post of lecturer at the school where Penderecki had recently finished studying and was employed as an assistant. In 1960, Drobner’s book Instrumentoznawstwo i akustyka was published, in which he called the sound source a vibrator, and in later publications called the body that agitates the vibrator an inciter. This book was important because it was one of the first to discuss the methods and parameters of timbral organization. Though these were not new ideas, it is likely Penderecki used this information from Drobner to develop his own timbre system.

Because Penderecki understood timbre primarily as a function of the materials, the timbral categories in his sonorism are based upon the most common materials used in the assembly of instruments and accessories of traditional symphonic orchestras: metal, wood, leather, felt, and hair. Though any of these materials can act as both vibrators and inciters, felt and hair are the least effective vibrators due to the fact that they would be inaudible when vibrated. This then means that at least one of the two sound-generating bodies must be made of metal, wood, or leather, referred to as primary materials. In Penderecki’s timbre system, the three primary materials may (and do) interact with one another, whereas felt and hair can only interact with one of the primary materials and not themselves.

Though he was inspired by Drobner, Penderecki’s timbre system goes another step further, in which “it is of no importance whether metal, wood, and leather are represented by a vibrator or by an inciter, both colliding bodies being of equal weight as primary materials.” This means that “if a given body can be a sound source—that is, if it is made of one of the three materials capable of performing this function (m, w, l) --then it becomes a sound source regardless of whether it is hit, rubbed or plucked or itself hits, rubs or plucks.”

Though Penderecki’s timbre system used material categories found in the traditional symphonic orchestra, he had to employ drastic changes to produce the desired effects. Because metal predominates typical orchestras (metal strings, metal percussion instruments, etc.), Penderecki needed to find ways of enlarging the representation of wood and leather. Though this was the case for other works, Polymorphia is based on an opposition of metal and wood. Since the piece is written solely for stringed instruments, Penderecki used a variety of methods to create opposing sections of metal and wood.

== Form ==
The work follows a traditional ABA’ formal framework, with each section roughly three minutes. Penderecki delineates each section through a system of contrasting timbres. The A section of the piece is from rehearsal 1 through rehearsal 32 and is characterized by sustained (arco) and often microtonal clusters of pitches. Additionally, these measures are based on the material category of metal. The B section begins at rehearsal 32 and goes to rehearsal 44. This section contrasts with the arco techniques in the A sections. It contains such percussive techniques as; battuto col legno (strike the strings with the wood of the bow); taps con dita (with fingers) between the bridge and tailpiece; pizzicato and pizzicato con due dita (plucked with two fingers). Also, from measures 38–43 a shift occurs to the material category of wood. Techniques in this section include strings struck with the palm of the hand, taps on the sound board with fingertips, and strikes on the stand with the bow or the chair with the nut (stands and chairs at the time were made of wood). Measures 42–45 are based on wood and metal, with a mix of the techniques described above. This section “mediates” the marked opposition of the metal and wood. The A’ section comes back to typical arco style, but includes bowing between the bridge and tailpiece and bowing the bridge and tailpiece. This overall timbral scheme of Polymorphia is metal-wood-metal, and helps to reinforce the ABA formal structure. Finally, the piece closes with a C Major triad distributed throughout the orchestra. This serves as a coda as well as a kind of release of the tension created by the microtones and unfamiliar timbral effects of the composition. In a 1977 interview with Composer magazine, Penderecki claimed that the C major chord was the seed from which the entire composition grew. Adrian Thomas interprets Penderecki's claim as "theoretically arguable and indeed the preceding emphases on certain pitch classes and the open clusters may retrospectively be seen to augur such a conclusion. The value of the C major triad lies not in any putative harmonic consequentiality that confirms a traditional process but in its radical challenge to what Penderecki had established as his norms."

== Temporal notation ==
Due to the nature of the timbre system, Penderecki had to devise a system of notation to properly convey his intentions. Many aspects of traditional notation are restructured, such as the traditional use of measures. Instead, the score is divided into sections, with each section given a length in seconds. The lengths of the sections vary from two to 25 seconds, and each is given a rehearsal number. In some sections of the work, the temporal processes within the sonoristic system become complex, with multiple entrances in several instrumental parts. To clarify his intentions, these sections are divided into seconds, with vertical lines in the score marking off each second. In Polymorphia, this occurs from rehearsals 11–24, 33–37, and 57–59.

== Pitch notation ==
Penderecki uses a staff in the notation of his sonoristic scores in places where a point of reference as to pitch is necessary. Generally, precision of pitch is of secondary importance in his sonoristic pieces. For instance, his use of quarter tones is not necessarily because a quarter-tone scale exists in his work, but they “are employed merely to regulate precisely the internal structure of a cluster, that is, to give clusters the desired density.” This technique is used extensively in both A sections of the work which are dominated by sustained pitch clusters. Additionally, from rehearsal number 11 through two-and-a-half seconds after rehearsal 24, he uses a staff with a starting pitch and then a line representing the tessitura of the material to be performed, rather than using the traditional notation. This technique makes possible the proper communication of details of this highly complex passage of clusters in Polymorphia.

== Graphic symbols ==
Penderecki communicates many of his timbral effects via means much more pictorial than in traditional Western music notation. These effects and their system of notation represent a key element of his style during this first compositional period. It is essentially a more advanced version of the system used in the Threnody for the Victims of Hiroshima, and it is further developed in the 1962 work Fluorescences. The score includes a page explaining 21 abbreviations and symbols which he uses throughout. A black triangle indicates that one should play “the highest note of instrument (indefinite pitch) ”. This effect occurs throughout the work and, as with the quarter tone effects mentioned above, the precise pitch of the note is not critical to the composition. Thus, Penderecki notates it without the staff, helping to make his notational system as visually efficient as possible. Another effect instructs the performer to “tap the desk with the bow or the chair with the heel.” Here, Penderecki turns traditionally non-musical items into instruments which are included in the work. This technique is used primarily in the B section where percussive effects dominate the texture. Here, the demands of the timbre system require that new means of sound production be introduced to the composition.

Throughout the score, Penderecki includes other forms of graphic notation. Thick, black lines signify tone clusters, as in the basses at rehearsal 6. Here, each individual is given a note to play, so that all notes of a scale sound simultaneously. At rehearsal eight in the basses, Penderecki uses a symbol resembling a long band of intersecting sound waves to represent a glissando passage. Here, a starting note is indicated for each player, but the speed of the glissando is “at choice.” Penderecki’s innovative notation system allows effective communication of the sonoristic system.

== Compositional process ==
The manuscript sketches of the score reveal insights into his compositional procedure. The sketch for Polymorphia is 33 pages long and is ordered and numbered in reverse chronology. The complete draft of the score appears first, followed by sketches “which grow progressively more fragmented and graphically abstract.” The earlier sketches are abstract graphic drawings made from Penderecki’s aural concepts. From these, he formulated pitch material and formal structure. Finally a shorthand notation was applied which could be translated into the complete piece of music. This score, as well as others in the sonoristic style, are notated in cutout format. Also, the sketches are visually impressive with their use of red, green, blue, and black ballpoint ink. Also noteworthy is Penderecki’s encephalographic pitch notation in the second A section from rehearsals 57 through 60. Here, he bases the composition on actual electroencephalograms, which are representations of brain waves. These were recorded at the Kraków Medical Center as patients listened to a recording of his Threnody for the Victims of Hiroshima. The musical effect created is that of sound masses of unbroken sliding pitches.

== In popular culture ==
Rock musician Jonny Greenwood collaborated with Penderecki on an album featuring Polymorphia released on March 13, 2012 and including a piece composed by Greenwood entitled 48 Responses to Polymorphia.

Polymorphia is used in the soundtrack of the horror films The Exorcist by director William Friedkin (1973) and The Shining by director Stanley Kubrick (1980). The song plays during the scene where Wendy Torrance discovers page after page of Jack Torrance's manuscript reading nothing but "All work and no play makes Jack a dull boy."

== Bibliography ==
- Bylander, Cindy. “A Selected Bibliography of Books and Articles on Penderecki's Avant Garde Composition.” Studies in Penderecki 1 (2003): 337–360
- Chlopicka, Regina. “Stylistic Phrases in the Work of Krzysztof Penderecki.” Studies in Penderecki 1 (1998): 51–64
- Chlopicka, Regina “Extra-musical inspirations in the early works of Krzysztof Penderecki.” Studies in Penderecki 2 (2003): 257–271
- Mirka, Danuta. The Sonoristic Structuralism of Krzysztof Penderecki. Katowice: Music Academy in Katowice, 1997.Mirka, Danuta. “To Cut the Gordian Knot: The Timbre System of Krzystof Penderecki.” Journal of Music Theory 45, no. 2 (Autumn, 2001): 435–456.
- Monastra, Peggy. “Krzysztof Penderecki’s Polymorphia and Fluorescences” Music History from Primary Sources: A Guide to the Moldenhauer Archives, ed. Jon Newsom and Alfred Mann. Washington: Library of Congress, 2000.
- Penderecki, Krzysztof. Polymorphia, 1962. Celle, Hermann Moeck, Verlag, 1963.
- Penderecki, Krzysztof. Polymorphia. Filharmonia Krakowska conducted by Henryk Czyz. [Poland]: Muza: PNCD 017, 1989. Compact Disc.
- Robinson, Ray. “Penderecki’s Musical Pilgrimage.” Studies in Penderecki 1 (1998): 33–50
- Robinson, Ray. “The Evolution of Penderecki’s Orchestra from Threnody to Fluorescences.” Studies in Penderecki 2 (2003): 249–256
- Schwinger, Wolfram. “The Changes in Four Decades: The Stylistic Paths of Krzysztof Penderecki.” Studies in Penderecki 1 (1998): 65–82
- Schwinger, Wolfram. “Krzysztof Penderecki: His Life and Works.” Translated by William Mann. London: Schott, 1989 ISBN 0-946535-11-6
- Thomas, Adrian. Polish music since Szymanowski. New York: Cambridge University Press, 2005: 179
- Tomaszewski, Mieczyslaw. “Penderecki’s Dialogues and Games with Time and Place on Earth.” Studies in Penderecki 1 (1998): 13–32

== Discography ==
- Berlin Philharmonic conducted by Herbert von Karajan. Concerto Brandenburghese n. 4 / Johann Sebastian Bach. Sinfonia n. 3 : Eroica / Ludwig van Beethoven. Polymorphia per 48 strumenti ad arco / Krzysztof Penderecki. [Milan]: Foyer 1-CF 2038, 1990. Compact disc.
- Cracow Philharmonia conducted by Henryk Czyz. Dies irae; Polymorphia; De natura sonoris. [Holland]: Philips 839 701 LY, 1967. LP 33 1/3 rpm.
- Orkiestra Symfoniczna Panstwowej Filharmonii w Krakowie conducted by Andrzej Markowski. Warszawska jesien – 1963 Automne de Varsovie. Kronika dzwiekowa Nr. 4. [Warsaw]: Muza W-87—W-876, 1963. LP 33 1/3 rpm.
- Various ensembles and performers. The Exorcist. [Burbank, CA]: Warner Home Video 16177-00-CD, 1998. Compact disc.
- Various ensembles and performers. Fearless: Music from the Original Soundtrack. [New York]: Elektra Nonesuch 79334-2, 1993. Compact disc.
- Various performers. Eternal Penderecki. [Hong Kong]: Naxos 8.572134, 2008. Compact disc.
- Various performers. St. Luke’s Passion; Threnody; Polymorphy; String Quartet; Psalms of David; Dimensions of Time and Silence. [Poland]: Polskie Nagrania Muza PNCD017, 1989. 2 Compact discs.
- Various soloists and ensembles. Die Neue Musik und ihre neuesten Entwicklungen. [Köln]:

Opus Musicum OM 116—118, 1975. 3 discs, 33 1/3 rpm stereo.

- Warsaw National Philharmonic Orchestra conducted by Antoni Wit. Te Deum. [Hong Kong]: Naxos 8.557980, 2007. Compact disc.
- Aukso Orchestra. Penderecki: Threnody for the Victims of Hiroshima; Polymorphia / Greenwood: Popcorn Superhet Receiver; 48 Responses. [New York]:Nonesuch B00722ZH5W, 2012. Compact disc.

== See also ==
- List of musical pieces which use extended techniques
