= Jarak Qaribak =

Studio album by Dudu Tassa and Jonny Greenwood
- Released: 9 June 2023
- Genre: Middle Eastern music
- Length: 39:44
- Label: World Circuit
- Producer: Dudu Tassa, Jonny Greenwood

Dudu Tassa chronology
שמש וענן (2023)	Jarak Qaribak (2023)	אי (2026)

Jonny Greenwood chronology
Licorice Pizza (2021)	Jarak Qaribak (2023)	One Battle After Another (2025)

Singles from Jarak Qaribak
- 1. "Ashufak Shay" Released: 13 April 2023; 2. "Taq ou-Dub" Released: 18 May 2023

Jarak Qaribak ("Your neighbour is your friend") is an album by the Israeli musician Dudu Tassa and the English guitarist Jonny Greenwood, released on 9 June 2023 by World Circuit. It was produced by Tassa and Greenwood and mixed by Nigel Godrich, the longtime producer of Greenwood's band Radiohead.

The album comprises reworkings of Middle Eastern love songs, with vocalists from countries including Iraq, Egypt, Syria and Tunisia. Tassa and Greenwood were criticised by pro-Palestine activists, and live performances were canceled following threats.

== Background and recording ==
Greenwood first heard Tassa's music on a trip to Israel with his band Radiohead in the early 2000s. He contributed to Tassa's 2009 album Basof Mitraglim Le'Hakol, and Tassa opened for Radiohead on their 2017 tour.

Jarak Qaribak was recorded in studios in Tel Aviv, Oxfordshire, and across the Middle East. "Taq ou-Dub", a Lebanese song, was the first recorded. Tassa said that the music "sounds 1970s", but with drum machines and Arabic lyrics, which he liked to imagine would confuse listeners. Greenwood said his process involved "trying to imagine what Kraftwerk would have done if they'd been in Cairo in the 1970s". He denied any intent to make a political point with the album, and said: "I do understand that as soon as you do anything in that part of the world it becomes political ... possibly especially if it's artistic."

== Release ==
Jarak Qaribak was released on 9 June 2023 by World Circuit. It was announced on 13 April, along with the release of the lead single, "Ashufak Shay", which features vocals from the Lebanese singer Rashid Al Najjar. On 27 April, Tassa and Greenwood released a live video for "Ya Mughir al-Ghazala", featuring the Iraqi vocalist Karrar Alsaadi. The second single, "Taq ou-Dub", featuring the Palestinian singer Nour Freteikh, was released on 18 May, with a live video filmed at the Hamam in Tel Aviv.

== Live ==
A European tour for Jarak Qaribak was canceled following the outbreak of the Gaza war in 2023. On May 26, 2024, Greenwood and Tassa performed at the Barby Club in Tel Aviv, a day after Greenwood appeared at a protest against the Israeli government. The performance was criticised by pro-Palestine activists; the Palestinian Campaign for the Academic and Cultural Boycott of Israel called for "peaceful, creative pressure on his band Radiohead to convincingly distance itself from this blatant complicity in the crime of crimes, or face grassroots measures". On June 4, Greenwood responded in a statement that Israeli artists should not be silenced. He described the project as a group of Middle Eastern musicians "working together across borders", and made no mention of Israel's war efforts.

In May 2025, two UK concerts by Jonny Greenwood and Tassa were canceled following threats to the venues and staff. Greenwood's brother, the Radiohead bassist Colin Greenwood, described the cancellations as "a curtailment of free speech and the possibilities of forging bonds between people with music and art".

== Reception ==
Jarak Qaribak ratings
Review scores
Source	Rating
The Guardian	4/5 stars
The Irish Times	4/5 stars
Mojo	4/5 stars
Pitchfork	7.7/10
Uncut	8/10
XS Noize	4.5/5 stars

The Herald Scotland's Michael Bedigan called Jarak Qaribak a "truly intriguing musical collection". The Guardian wrote that its arrangements "uplift the essence of their originals ... highlighting how its longing melodies can be reapplied into new voices, transmitting similar emotions through unusual settings". Der Spiegel named Jarak Qaribak one of the best albums of 2023.

== Track listing ==
Jarak Qaribak track listing
No.	Title	Writer(s)	Length
1.	"Djit Nishrab" (featuring Ahmed Doma)	Ahmed Wahby	6:25
2.	"Ashufak Shay" (featuring Rashid Al Najjar)	Mehad Hamad	3:21
3.	"Taq ou-Dub" (featuring Nour Freteikh)	Maroon Nasser; Mohamad Mohsen	3:37
4.	"Leylet Hub" (featuring Mohssine Salaheddine)	Ahmad Shafik Kamel; Mohammed Abdel Wahab	4:41
5.	"Ya Mughir al-Ghazala" (featuring Karrar Alsaadi)	Abdallah Alsahel; Mohamad Alkukbani	3:54
6.	"Ahibak" (featuring Safae Essafi)	Daoud Akram; Naim Rajuan	4:57
7.	"Ya 'Anid Ya Yaba" (featuring Lynn A.)	Traditional	3:39
8.	"Lhla Yzid Ikthar"	Abd Al-Wahab Dukali; Abdel Rahman Alami	4:43
9.	"Jan al-Galb Salik" (featuring Noamane Chaari & Zaineb Elouati)	Abdel Karim Al 'Alaf; Saleh Al'Kuwaiti	4:23
Total length:			39:44

== Personnel ==
- Jonny Greenwood – producer, guitar, bass, synthesisers, electronics
- Dudu Tassa – producer, guitar, bass, vocals
- Nigel Godrich – mixing
- Ahmed Doma – vocals (1)
- Rashid Al Najjar – vocals (2)
- Nour Freteikh – vocals (3)
- Mohsinne Salaheddine – vocals (4)
- Karrar Alsaadi – vocals (5)
- Safae Essafi – vocals (6)
- Lynn A. – vocals (7)
- Noamane Chaari – vocals (9)
- Zaineb Elouati – vocals (9)

== Charts ==
Weekly chart performance for Jarak Qaribak
Chart (2023)	Peak position
Scottish Albums (OCC)	70
UK Albums Sales Chart (OCC)	34
UK Independent Albums (OCC)	13
US Current Album Sales (Billboard)	68
