= Boston Society of Film Critics Award for Best Use of Music in a Film =

== Best Use of Music in a Film ==
=== 2000s ===
Year	Winner	Composer(s)
2009	Crazy Heart	Ryan Bingham, Stephen Bruton and T Bone Burnett

=== 2010s ===
Year	Winner	Composer(s)	Ref.
2010	The Social Network	Trent Reznor and Atticus Ross	
2011	The Artist	Ludovic Bource	
2011	Drive	Cliff Martinez	
2012	Moonrise Kingdom	Alexandre Desplat	
2013	Inside Llewyn Davis	-	
2014	Inherent Vice	Jonny Greenwood	
2015	Love & Mercy	Atticus Ross	

== Best Original Score ==
=== 2010s ===
Year	Winner	Composer(s)
2015	Love & Mercy	Atticus Ross
2016	Jackie	Micachu
2017	Phantom Thread	Jonny Greenwood
2018	If Beale Street Could Talk	Nicholas Britell
2019	Little Women	Alexandre Desplat

=== 2020s ===
Year	Winner	Composer(s)
2020	Minari	Emile Mosseri
2021	Spencer	Jonny Greenwood
2022	RRR	M. M. Keeravani
2023	Killers of the Flower Moon	Robbie Robertson
2024	The Brutalist	Daniel Blumberg
2025	Sinners	Ludwig Göransson
