= Bodysong (album) =

Soundtrack album by Jonny Greenwood
- Released: October 27, 2003 (UK); November 27, 2003 (Japan); February 24, 2004 (US)
- Genre: Avant-garde
- Length: 44:36
- Label: Parlophone (UK); 5951470 (CD); 5951471 (LP); Toshiba-EMI (Japan); TOCP 66427; Capitol (US); CDP 7243 5 95147 0 3
- Producer: Jonny Greenwood, Graeme Stewart

Jonny Greenwood chronology
Bodysong (2003)	There Will Be Blood (2007)

Professional ratings
Review scores
Source	Rating
Allmusic	3/5 stars
Pitchfork Media	(7.7/10)

Bodysong is the debut solo album by the Radiohead guitarist Jonny Greenwood, and the soundtrack to the documentary film Bodysong. It was released on October 27, 2003 in the UK and on February 24, 2004 in the United States. Bodysong was digitally remastered and reissued on CD and vinyl on 18 May 2018.

Greenwood's brother, the Radiohead bassist Colin Greenwood, contributed to the album. "Convergence" was later included in Greenwood's score for the 2007 film There Will Be Blood.

== Track listing ==
- All songs written and produced by Jonny Greenwood:
1. "Moon Trills" – 5:17
2. "Moon Mall" – 1:12
3. "Trench" – 2:38
4. "Iron Swallow" – 2:07
5. "Clockwork Tin Soldiers" – 3:48
6. "Convergence" – 4:26
7. "Nudnik Headache" – 2:16
8. "Peartree" – 3:06
9. "Splitter" – 3:57
10. "Bode Radio/Glass Light/Broken Hearts" – 4:36
11. "24 Hour Charleston" – 2:39
12. "Milky Drops from Heaven" – 4:44
13. "Tehellet" – 3:40

== Personnel ==
Adapted from the liner notes.

- Jonny Greenwood - piano, ondes Martenot, guitar, banjo, production
- Graeme Stuart - production, recording
- Shin Katan - artwork
- Stanley Donwood - artwork
- Julian Arguelles - saxophone (tracks 9,12)
- Gerard Presencer - trumpet (tracks 9, 12)
- Colin Greenwood - bass guitar, programming (track 11)
- Jeremy Brown - bass guitar (tracks 9, 12)
- Gene Calderazzo - drums (tracks 9, 12)
- The Emperor Quartet - strings (tracks 4, 10, 13)
  - Martin Burgess - violin
  - Clare Hayes - violin
  - Fiona Bonds - viola
  - William Schofeld - cello

== See also ==
- Music from The Body
