= Inherent Vice (soundtrack) =

Inherent Vice (Original Motion Picture Soundtrack)

Soundtrack album by Jonny Greenwood and various artists
- Released: December 15, 2014
- Recorded: December 2013–February 2014
- Genre: Film soundtrack
- Length: 54:42
- Label: Nonesuch
- Producer: Jonny Greenwood

Jonny Greenwood chronology
The Master (2012)	Inherent Vice (2014)	Junun (2015)

Singles from Inherent Vice (Original Motion Picture Soundtrack)
- 1. "Spooks" Released: December 9, 2014

Inherent Vice (Original Motion Picture Soundtrack) is the soundtrack to the 2014 film of the same name. It features an original score composed by Jonny Greenwood, along with music by Can, the Marketts, Minnie Riperton, Kyu Sakamoto, Neil Young, Les Baxter and Chuck Jackson. "Spooks" was released as a single on December 9, 2014. Nonesuch Records released the soundtrack through ITunes on December 15, and a wide release, the following day.

== Background ==
The score was Greenwood's third collaboration with Anderson following There Will Be Blood (2007) and The Master (2012). When Greenwood read the script, it consisted of all the elements in the book about the arpanet (the first ever internet computer), so he composed more electronic material that sounded like it was coming from the computer. However, Greenwood decided to implement orchestral ideas in the score. The recording held on early-December 2013 and continued till February 2014. The score was performed by the Royal Philharmonic Orchestra led by Clio Gould and conducted by Robert Ziegler.

The soundtrack features a version of an unreleased track by Greenwood's band Radiohead, "Spooks". Greenwood said Radiohead's version was "a half-idea we never made work live", describing it as a pastiche of the Pixies and surf music. For Inherent Vice, Greenwood reworked it with performances by Gaz Coombes and Danny Goffey of Supergrass, and Joanna Newsom provided spoken word.

The soundtrack also includes music from the late 1960s and 1970s. Some of the contributions from Can, the Marketts, Minnie Riperton, Kyu Sakamoto, Neil Young, Les Baxter and Chuck Jackson were included in the soundtrack, but other artists whose songs not included in the album—the Tornados, the Cascades, the Association, Jack Scott, Bob Irwin, Frank Comstock among others—were featured in the film. IndieWire released the track list featured in the film, after the New York Film Festival premiere on October 4.

== Track listing ==
The track list was unveiled on November 17, 2014, which had only nine songs from the film, while the remaining tracks are from Greenwood's original score. The soundtrack was released on December 15, three days after the film.

No.	Title	Performer(s)	Length
1.	"Shasta"	Jonny Greenwood; Royal Philharmonic Orchestra (conducted by Robert Ziegler)	2:40
2.	"Vitamin C"	Can	3:32
3.	"Meeting Crocker Fenway"	Greenwood; Royal Philharmonic	1:25
4.	"Here Comes the Ho-Dads"	The Marketts	2:10
5.	"Spooks"	Greenwood	2:35
6.	"Shasta Fay"	Greenwood; Royal Philharmonic	7:02
7.	"Les Fleur"	Minnie Riperton	3:15
8.	"The Chryskylodon Institute"	Greenwood; Royal Philharmonic	3:04
9.	"Sukiyaki"	Kyu Sakamoto	3:06
10.	"Adrian Prussia"	Greenwood; Royal Philharmonic	2:51
11.	"Journey Through the Past"	Neil Young	2:22
12.	"Simba"	Les Baxter	2:42
13.	"Under the Paving-Stones, the Beach!"	Greenwood	1:56
14.	"The Golden Fang"	Greenwood; Royal Philharmonic	4:50
15.	"Amethyst"	Greenwood	2:03
16.	"Shasta Fay Hepworth"	Greenwood; Royal Philharmonic	5:45
17.	"Any Day Now"	Chuck Jackson	3:24
Total length:			54:42

== Additional music ==
Film music not included in the album:

1. "Dreamin' On a Cloud" – The Tornados
2. "Rhythm of the Rain" – The Cascades
3. "Soup" – Can
4. "Burning Bridges" – Jack Scott
5. "The Throwaway Age" – Bob Irwin
6. "Gilligan's Island Theme" – Sherwood Schwartz and George Wyle
7. "Harvest" – Neil Young
8. "Electricity" – Cliff Adams
9. "Never My Love" – The Association
10. "Adam-12 (Themes and Cues)" – Frank Comstock
11. "(What A) Wonderful World" – Sam Cooke

== Reception ==
The review aggregator website Metacritic assigned a score 79 out of 100 to the album, indicating "generally favorable reviews". Jayson Greene of Pitchfork rated 7.3/10 to the album, saying "Like the movie, the soundtrack is a pungent, incoherent, occasionally haunting trifle. The feeling is of a bunch of intelligent and talented people trying on a bunch of funny-colored clothing and giggling at each other. If you're not wearing the costumes, there's a limit to just how entertained by all of it you can be." Heather Phares of AllMusic wrote "In its own way, Inherent Vice is as subtly and carefully crafted as Greenwood's other scores for Anderson's films, but its wit and heart make it special in its own right."

Sean Wilson of Music Files wrote "Greenwood has established a recognisable musical voice over just five feature films, and although Inherent Vice is almost certainly the most straightforward of all his scores, it still retains the technical complexity for which he's renowned." Joe Goggins of Drowned In Sound gave 7 out of 10 to the album and wrote Greenwood's "non-Radiohead output has always been interesting and has often been compelling". Will Schube of Passion of the Weiss wrote "The soundtrack's an easy listen, partially because Greenwood's work is less demanding, but also in how the record's sequencing intersperses underground classics of the 70s among the original work." Ben Hogwood of MusicOMH rated three-and-a-half out of five, saying "this is undoubtedly Greenwood's work, and he writes with ever-growing assurance and colour, broadening the orchestral palette. It's just a shame this album as a whole could not be arranged in a more satisfying way".

== Accolades ==
Award	Date of ceremony	Category	Recipients	Result	Ref.
Boston Society of Film Critics	December 7, 2014	Best Use of Music in a Film	Jonny Greenwood	Won	
Denver Film Critics Society	January 12, 2015	Best Score	Jonny Greenwood	Nominated	
International Film Music Critics Association Awards	February 19, 2015	Best Original Score for an Action/Adventure/Thriller Film	Jonny Greenwood	Nominated	
Los Angeles Film Critics Association	December 7, 2014	Best Music Score (tied with Mica Levi for Under the Skin)	Jonny Greenwood	Won	
