= Blind Mr. Jones =

British shoegazing band

- Origin: Marlow, England
- Genre: Shoegazing
- Years active: 1991–1994
- Label: Cherry Red
- Past members: James Franklin; Richard Moore; Jon Tegner; Will Teversham; Jon White

Blind Mr. Jones were a British shoegazing band of the early 1990s, from Marlow, England.

== History ==
Blind Mr. Jones formed in 1991. The band's name is derived from the first two tracks of the Talking Heads album Naked. The original lineup was Richard Moore (vocals, guitar), James Franklin (guitar), Will Teversham (vocals, bass guitar) and Jon White (drums). They signed to Cherry Red.

The band's first EP, Eyes Wide, featured guitar parts written by Slowdive's Neil Halstead, while the Crazy Jazz EP featured harmonica from Radiohead's Jonny Greenwood.

Flautist Jon Tegner was added after the first EP, giving the band a distinctive sound.

The band released two albums on Cherry Red, Stereo Musicale (1992) and Tatooine (1994), before splitting up in 1994.

Later compilations that collected the band's work were Spooky Vibes: The Very Best of Blind Mr. Jones (2005) and Over My Head: The Complete Recordings (2008). In 2017, Graveface Records released Stereo Musicale Retrospective, which included that entire album as well as singles and demos, for Record Store Day. The band disbanded after the release of the 1994 album "Tatooine". The band will most likely not return, following the death of lead singer Richard Moore.

== Discography ==
=== Studio albums ===
- Stereo Musicale (1992, Cherry Red Records)
- Tatooine (1994, Cherry Red Records)

=== EPs ===
- Eyes Wide (1992, Cherry Red Records)
- Crazy Jazz (1992, Cherry Red Records)

=== Singles ===
- "Spooky Vibes" (1994, Cherry Red Records)

=== Compilation albums ===
- Spooky Vibes: The Very Best of Blind Mr. Jones (2005, Cherry Red Records)
- Over My Head: The Complete Recordings (2008, Cherry Red Records)
- Stereo Musicale Retrospective (2017, Graveface Records)
