= The Master (soundtrack) =

The Master: Original Motion Picture Soundtrack

Soundtrack album by Jonny Greenwood
- Released: September 11, 2012
- Recorded: 2012
- Genre: Soundtrack
- Length: 46:41
- Label: Nonesuch
- Producer: Jonny Greenwood, Graeme Stewart

Jonny Greenwood chronology
We Need to Talk About Kevin (2011)	The Master: Original Motion Picture Soundtrack (2012)	Inherent Vice (2014)

"What I really enjoy about writing for orchestras is realizing that it's kind of self-evident, but the fact that they are 48 individuals and it's not, you know, a preset on a keyboard [...] It's all these people that have opinions and they're making decisions about how to play."

— Jonny Greenwood on writing the orchestral score for The Master.

The Master: Original Motion Picture Soundtrack is the soundtrack to the 2012 film of the same name. The album released by Nonesuch Records on September 11, 2012, comprises eleven compositions from the original score by Jonny Greenwood, who had previously collaborated with Anderson on There Will Be Blood (2007). The score is accompanied by four recordings from late-1930s to early-1950s. Greenwood's score received critical acclaim and numerous accolades.

== Track listing ==
All music is composed by Jonny Greenwood except as noted below.

No.	Title	Performer	Length
1.	"Overtones"		2:20
2.	"Time Hole"		1:42
3.	"Back Beyond"		3:42
4.	"Get Thee Behind Me Satan"	Ella Fitzgerald	3:47
5.	"Alethia"		4:06
6.	"Don't Sit Under the Apple Tree (with Anyone Else But Me)"	Madisen Beaty	1:36
7.	"Atomic Healer"		1:24
8.	"Able-Bodied Seamen"		3:54
9.	"The Split Saber"		3:41
10.	"Baton Sparks"		2:20
11.	"No Other Love"	Jo Stafford	3:00
12.	"His Master's Voice"		3:34
13.	"Application 45 Version 1"		5:40
14.	"Changing Partners"	Helen Forrest	2:42
15.	"Sweetness of Freddie"		3:25
Total length:			46:41

== Complete score ==
In December 2012, The Weinstein Company released a comprehensive score from Greenwood's album as a part of their For Your Consideration campaign for the 2012–13 film awards season. The album featured alternative versions of Greenwood's score that were not included in the soundtrack.

No.	Title	Length
1.	"Baton Sparks"	1:06
2.	"Able Bodied Seamen" (V1)	3:51
3.	"Time Hole" (V1)	1:08
4.	"Time Hole" (V2)	1:48
5.	"The Split Sabre Combined"	2:37
6.	"Overtones" (V1)	2:33
7.	"Alethia"	4:15
8.	"Overtones" (V2)	1:36
9.	"Able Bodied Seamen" (V2)	6:44
10.	"His Masters Voice"	3:30
11.	"Application 45" (V1)	6:11
12.	"Overtones" (V3)	2:03
13.	"Overtones" (V4 and V5)	0:47
14.	"Back Beyond"	1:54
15.	"Sweetness Of Freddie"	2:33
16.	"Overtones" (V6)	2:25
17.	"Back Beyond Credits"	3:45
Total length:		48:45

== Reception ==
Greenwood's score received acclaim from critics. The review aggregating website Metacritic, assigned a score 74 out of 100 from 16 reviews, indicating "generally favorable reviews".

Heather Phares of AllMusic giving four stars to the album, wrote: "Most of Greenwood's compositions convey a simmering sense of tension and marred, ambiguous beauty that occasionally resolves itself into more definite emotions such as mysticality, sense of danger, or poignancy. This uneasy listening provides a masterful backdrop for Anderson's film and also makes for fascinating listening in its own right, while once again separating Greenwood from more predictable composers." Ryan Bray of Consequence assigned a C+ grade to the soundtrack and wrote: "The Master isn't a Radiohead record, but at points it's easy to suspect that it could be. Radiohead’s music has become increasingly cinematic in scope, and their songs draw much of their power from the ability to evoke vivid, often cynical imagery. Anderson’s film called for just that, and Greenwood here delivers a score worthy of the filmmaker's faith and trust [...] the highest compliment that can be paid The Master soundtrack is that it furthers that sense of excitement. Greenwood has delivered a score that's both haunting and beautiful, and if Anderson's film is even half as strangely inspired, we’re all in for something good." Jon Clark writing for Drowned in Sound, gave 8/10 to the album, summarising: "Those expecting a Radiohead-like album may be disappointed, but many aspects of what make them a great band are firmly in place here; cinematic and experimental, it is a very much a work of their guitarist."

Howard Gorman of MusicOMH assigned four-and-a-half out of five and wrote: "Greenwood has recorded an eerie yet stunning score, and if Anderson’s production is just as aspiring then filmgoers are in for a real treat for the senses." Analysing the album, James Montgomery of MTV had complimented the soundtrack as "positivelly marvelous" being enveloped and enthralled by its "scope and intimacy", he further wrote: "Greenwood's score is as much a character as any of the actors, plays just as vital a role in creating the film's surreal, psychological edge. It just may be the best score you'll hear all year (or, more probably, the only one), as mercurial and multilayered as The Master itself. It works on a level that goes beyond mere accompaniment." Music critic Jonathan Broxton called the score as "intelligent musical composition", giving four stars to the album. Sean Wilson of Mfiles wrote: "Greenwood's distinctive, unusual and striking work is among the best of 2012, an acute musical distillation of a tormented state of mind."

Peter Travers from Rolling Stone called as "haunting" and "hypnotic". Peter Bradshaw of The Guardian called Greenwood's "unsettling score" strongly contributed the film. Joe Morgenstern of The Wall Street Journal called the score as "eerie" and "dissonant". David Edelstein of Vulture wrote: "While Anderson paints with light, composer Jonny Greenwood is painting with sound — electrified strings, atonal horns, reworkings of Penderecki and Bartók. (Even the soundtrack’s old standards like 'No Other Love' and 'You Go to My Head' have a chill.)" Oliver Lyletton of IndieWire wrote: "Jonny Greenwood's percussive, unpredictable score might even exceed his astonishing work on 'There Will Be Blood'." She called it as one of the "best soundtracks of 2012".

Adam Woodward of Little White Lies reviewed that Greenwood's "fretful jazz-infused score" reflects the film's polarised mood, along with the cinematography and art direction. Anthony Lane of The New Yorker claimed that Greenwood's "rich and inventive score is used with such unceasing fervor that you almost want it, now and then, to take a break and leave the action in peace". Mark Adams of Screen International wrote: "Equally striking is Jonny Greenwood wonderful score that is pitched perfectly and grips right from the first scenes in the South Pacific." Dave Calhoun of Time Out called the score as "spare, jaunty and eccentric". Calum Marsh of Slant Magazine called the score as "serious" and "propulsive",

== Accolades ==
Award / Association	Date of ceremony	Category	Recipient(s)	Result	Ref(s)
Chicago Film Critics Association	December 17, 2012	Best Original Score	Jonny Greenwood	Won	
Critics' Choice Movie Awards	January 10, 2013	Best Score	Jonny Greenwood	Nominated	
Georgia Film Critics Association	January 2013	Best Original Score	Jonny Greenwood	Nominated	
Houston Film Critics Society	January 5, 2013	Best Original Score	The Master	Nominated	
International Cinephile Society	February 11, 2013	Best Original Score	Jonny Greenwood	Runner-up	
Los Angeles Film Critics Association	December 9, 2012	Best Music	Jonny Greenwood	Runner-up	
San Diego Film Critics Society	December 11, 2012	Best Score	Jonny Greenwood	Won	
Satellite Awards	December 16, 2012	Best Original Score	Jonny Greenwood	Nominated	
Washington D.C. Area Film Critics Association	December 10, 2012	Best Score	Jonny Greenwood	Won	
World Soundtrack Awards	October 19, 2013	Best Original Score of the Year	Jonny Greenwood	Nominated	

== Best original score disqualification ==
In September 2012, an article from Vulture written by Seth Colter Walls highlighted that possibility of Greenwood's score for The Master being disqualified for nomination at the Academy Award for Best Original Score at the 85th Academy Awards, as two of its pieces were derived from Greenwood's orchestral piece "48 Responses to Polymorphia", which premiered in late 2011. The Academy of Motion Picture Arts and Sciences' rules for Original Score nomination stated that cues written specifically for the motion picture could be qualified for the award nomination, and such cues must be recorded specifically for the motion picture prior to any other usage. The rule also stated that scores diluted by the use of tracked themes and pre-existing music would be ruled ineligible for submission, even though 35% of the pre-existing material should be used in the film.

Walls felt that two of the cues, "Overtones" and "Baton Sparks", contained music inspired from the orchestral piece, either partially or entirely. In the former, the track started differently than the original cue while in the 113th second, the piece started similarly identical to the album. Whereas the latter was heavily inspired from the piece. The score was performed by the Scottish Ensemble and AUKSO Orchestra, which performed the orchestral piece and was being recorded by the same engineers in Kraków, Poland. Greenwood's There Will Be Blood score was disqualified from the Original Score nomination as less than half of the complete score had been derived from his piece "Popcorn Superhet Receiver".

In contrast to Walls' claims, The Hollywood Reporter critic Scott Feinberg claimed Greenwood's score would be one of the frontrunners for the Best Original Score nomination. The Weinstein Company also claimed the possibilities that the score would be qualified as most of the material were specifically written for the film. The score was disqualified from being nominated at the Academy Awards, partly due to the inspiration of the cues from the aforementioned piece and the box-office underperformance attributed to losing out specific categories for nomination.

== Credits ==
Credits adapted from Nonesuch Records official website:

Musicians

- London Contemporary Orchestra (tracks: 3, 5, 9, 12, 13, 15)
- Hugh Brunt – conductor (tracks: 3, 5, 9, 12, 13, 15)
- Daniel Pioro – violin (tracks: 3, 5, 9, 12, 13, 15)
- Galya Bisengalieva – violin (tracks: 3, 5, 9, 12, 13, 15)
- Daniel Llewellyn Roberts – violin (tracks: 3, 5, 9, 12, 13, 15)
- Robert Ames – viola (tracks: 3, 5, 9, 12, 13, 15)
- Charlotte Bonneton – viola (tracks: 3, 5, 9, 12, 13, 15)
- Oliver Coates – cello (tracks: 3, 5, 9, 12, 13, 15)
- Peteris Sokolovskis – cello (tracks: 3, 5, 9, 12, 13, 15)
- Dave Brown – double bass (tracks: 3, 5, 9, 12, 13, 15)
- Pasha Mansurov – flute (tracks: 3, 5, 9, 12, 13, 15)
- Mark Simpson – clarinet (tracks: 3, 5, 9, 12, 13, 15)
- Simon Cox – trumpet (tracks: 3, 5, 9, 12, 13, 15)
- Mark Wood – French horn (tracks: 3, 5, 9, 12, 13, 15)
- Kate Hainsworth – French horn (tracks: 3, 5, 9, 12, 13, 15)
- Peter Foggitt – organ, piano (tracks: 3, 5, 9, 12, 13, 15)
- Antoine Françoise – organ, piano (tracks: 3, 5, 9, 12, 13, 15)
- AUKSO Chamber Orchestra (tracks: 1, 10)
- Marek Moś – conductor (tracks: 1, 10)
- Andy Finton – woodwinds (tracks: 2, 7)
- David Fuest – woodwinds (tracks: 2, 7)
- Anthony Pike – woodwinds (tracks: 2, 7)
- Ella Fitzgerald – vocals (track: 4)
- Paul Weston and His Orchestra (tracks: 4, 11)
- Shabaka Hutchings – clarinet (track: 8)
- Jimmy Hastings – clarinet, flute (track: 8)
- Neil Charles – bass (track: 8)
- Tom Skinner – drums (track: 8)
- Jo Stafford – vocals (track: 11)
- Helen Forrest – vocals (track: 11)
- Sy Oliver Orchestra (track: 14)

Production credits

- Jonny Greenwood – composer (tracks: 1–3, 5, 7–10, 12–13, 15), producer (all tracks), mixing (tracks: 2, 7)
- Irving Berlin – composer (track: 4)
- Sam H. Stept – composer (track: 6)
- Lew Brown – composer (track: 6)
- Charles Tobias – composer (track: 6)
- Bob Russell – composer (track: 11)
- Paul Weston – composer (track: 11)
- Larry Coleman – composer (track: 14)
- Joe Darion – composer (track: 14)
- Graeme Stewart – music production (all tracks), recording (tracks: 2–3, 5, 7–9, 12–13, 15), mixing engineer (Abbey Road Studios, London) [track: 1, 3, 5, 8–10, 12–13, 15]
- Ewa Guziolek-Tubelewicz – recording (Alvernia Studios, Kraków, Poland) [track: 1, 10]
- Piort Witkowski – recording (Alvernia Studios, Kraków, Poland) [track: 1, 10]
- John Barrett – assistant engineer
- Christian Wright – mastering (Abbey Road Studios, London) [all tracks]
- Shin Katan – artwork
- Dustin Stanton – design
