= The Power of the Dog (soundtrack) =

The Power of the Dog (Soundtrack from the Netflix Film)

Film score by Jonny Greenwood
- Released: November 17, 2021
- Genre: Film score
- Length: 41:33
- Label: Lakeshore; Invada
- Producer: Jonny Greenwood

Jonny Greenwood chronology
Spencer (2021)	The Power of the Dog (2021)	Licorice Pizza (2021)

The Power of the Dog (Soundtrack from the Netflix Film) is the score for the 2021 film The Power of the Dog, composed by Jonny Greenwood. It was released by Lakeshore Records and Invada Records on November 17, 2021.

The score album features 17 tracks and a range of modern instruments. It ranges from contemporary music to dark ambient and orchestral sounds, achieved by blending instruments in the sounds. Greenwood's score received positive critical response and received nominations and awards including Academy, Golden Globe, Grammy and BAFTA award nominations.

== Background ==
Campion recruited Jonny Greenwood to compose the score for The Power of the Dog. Speaking to the Variety, she said "He thought a lot about instruments and creating a palette for the instruments in the way that designers often do". While writing the score, Greenwood rendered the 1920s music of Montana as uncanny, foreboding rhythms which feel essential to the film's mix of oddity and dread in the concluding moments, that culminates "a disquieting cascade of disparate notes". Greenwood said "I'm a big fan of these musical scales that are called modes of limited transposition. As well as major and minor scales, you have modes. And some modes are more interesting than others. The one used there has four different tonal centers, so it's like having four keys at once—which means that you never really resolve harmonically to the home chord."

Greenwood wanted to avoid the "sweeping strings" typical of Westerns, opting instead to use atonal brass sounds in order to emphasize the "alien and forbidding" nature of the film's landscapes. He was inspired from the music of Star Trek: The Original Series (1966), which had a contemporary brass sounds. To achieve this, he hired a couple of French horn players from the orchestra and recorded it in a church in Oxford, intending that "that reverb in the church would be the third instrument". He was not satisfied with the sound of Phil's banjo on screen, as he "wanted to tap into the darker side of the instrument, which would almost mirror Phil's personality". As an alternative, he used to play the cello like a banjo on his own, using the same fingerpicking technique. The resulting sound, according to Greenwood, was "a nice confusion" and "a sound you recognize, but it's not a style that you're familiar with." As a result of the COVID-19 pandemic and the gathering restrictions in place, Greenwood was unable to work with an orchestra and had to record much of the cello parts on his own, layering them to achieve an orchestral texture.

"It was recorded at the height of the pandemic, and all the harshest restrictions on gatherings were in place. I did manage to get a viola quartet on one day, and six cellos on another. But because orchestras were unusable, I had to fake a lot of it using my own cello. I can't really play it very well with the bow, so it was a process of tuning the strings to each pitch and recording myself playing all the notes one at a time. Eventually, I built up an orchestral texture."

— Jonny Greenwood, in an interview to Variety about recording the home-made orchestral parts by layering cellos.

Greenwood used a computer-controlled mechanical piano, and for scoring it he bought a piano tuning wrench, as he could detune the strings while playing. He made use of the programming software: Max/MSP to modify the sound and pitch. The instrument suited for the character, Rose, as "not only is her story wrapped up in the instrument, but it was also a good texture for her gradual mental unraveling". He worked on recording the piano score for hours, so that the tunes could be adjusted. For creating themes for Phil, Greenwood used horns and dark strings seemed a good direction to go in. He did not use violins for scoring, and instead stuck to the lower sounds of cellos and violas.

"I was sending her [Campion] the things that I could play – the piano stuff, and the solo cello things – but the rest she didn't hear until they were recorded (computer demos are so off-putting for everyone). She responded often with hand-written notes, scanned and emailed. Her energy was a huge part of how this music was written."

— Greenwood, on Campion's involvement in the score composition.

Despite being a period film, Greenwood opted to use modern sounds. Calling about this approach, Greenwood said that "This film has such an unusual tone: Me playing pastiche American folk music would never suit all the repressed conflict or Phil's dark, angry intelligence".

== Release ==
On October 27, 2021, Jonny Greenwood announced the release of two songs: "25 Years" and "West" through digital platforms. Variety magazine, debuted the tracks exclusively online, featuring a review for the first track saying "it is an infectious melody, which orchestrating a dark, brooding selection blended with a light honky-tonk undertone that matches perfectly with the period" and listeners "may find more of his signature stylistic eclecticism, which showcases an emotional pastiche from his work on The Master (2012)".

Lakeshore Records and Invada Records released the soundtrack on November 17, 2021, through digital (audio streaming) and physical (CD and vinyl) formats. In addition to the soundtracks, a For Your Consideration album, featuring 16 tracks from the original score was released in December 2021, to showcase the score in various award ceremonies for 2021.

== Track listing ==
No.	Title	Length
1.	"25 Years"	02:17
2.	"Requiem for Phil"	02:25
3.	"So Soft"	03:03
4.	"Detuned Mechanical Piano"	01:33
5.	"Prelude"	01:42
6.	"The Ravine"	01:34
7.	"Mimicry"	01:49
8.	"West Alone"	01:37
9.	"Miss Nancy Arrives"	01:40
10.	"Figured It Out"	01:54
11.	"Viola Quartet"	02:50
12.	"Best Friends"	01:48
13.	"Paper Flowers"	01:59
14.	"A Lovely Evening"	02:43
15.	"They Were Mine"	03:19
16.	"West"	02:32
17.	"Psalm 22"	06:42

== Reception ==
Pitchfork's Brian Howe wrote "Greenwood must be the only artist who has both headlined Coachella and collaborated with Krzysztof Penderecki, the Polish composer whose turbulent tone clusters he often evokes in The Power of the Dog. When those shivers course through the strings, it might be the cry of night-veiled coyotes or a wail at the edge where one world ends and another begins. That double image perfectly exemplifies Greenwood's own synthesis of pulp-Western brawn and refined symphonic emotion." James Southall of Movie Wave wrote "A word about the album, by the way – with cues presented radically out of sequence in terms of their appearance in the film, and with some missing – it's been produced the old-fashioned way, with the optimal listening experience in mind – and is all the stronger for it." Jonathan Broxton wrote "As actual music, though, it's a tougher sell. Some of it is very discordant and challenging, there is almost no conventional emotional content to latch onto, and anyone who needs identifiable thematic content in order to truly connect with a score will find it lacking." The New Yorker, IndieWire, and Insider Inc. called it one of the best film scores of 2021.

== Awards and nominations ==
Award	Date of ceremony	Category	Recipient(s)	Result	Ref.
Academy Awards	March 27, 2022	Best Original Score	Jonny Greenwood	Nominated	
Austin Film Critics Association	January 11, 2022	Best Original Score	Jonny Greenwood	Won	
British Academy Film Awards	March 13, 2022	Best Original Music	Jonny Greenwood	Nominated	
Chicago Film Critics Association	December 15, 2021	Best Original Score	Jonny Greenwood	Won	
Critics' Choice Awards	March 13, 2022	Best Score	Jonny Greenwood	Nominated	
Dallas–Fort Worth Film Critics Association	December 20, 2021	Best Musical Score	Jonny Greenwood	2nd Place	
Dorian Awards	March 17, 2022	Best Film Music	Jonny Greenwood	Nominated	
Florida Film Critics Circle	December 22, 2021	Best Score	Jonny Greenwood	Runner-up	
Georgia Film Critics Association	January 14, 2022	Best Original Score	Jonny Greenwood	Nominated	
Gold Derby Film Awards	March 16, 2022	Best Original Score	Jonny Greenwood	Nominated	
Golden Globe Awards	January 9, 2022	Best Original Score	Jonny Greenwood	Nominated	
Grammy Awards	February 5, 2023	Best Score/Soundtrack for Visual Media	Jonny Greenwood	Nominated	
Hollywood Music in Media Awards	November 17, 2021	Best Original Score in a Feature Film	Jonny Greenwood	Nominated	
Houston Film Critics Society	January 19, 2022	Best Original Score	Jonny Greenwood	Nominated	
London Film Critics Circle	February 6, 2022	Technical Achievement Award (music)	Jonny Greenwood	Nominated	
Los Angeles Film Critics Association	December 18, 2021	Best Music	Jonny Greenwood	Runner-up	
Online Film Critics Society	January 24, 2022	Best Original Score	Jonny Greenwood	Won	
San Francisco Bay Area Film Critics Circle	January 10, 2022	Best Original Score	Jonny Greenwood	Won	
Satellite Awards	April 2, 2022	Best Original Score	Jonny Greenwood	Nominated	
Seattle Film Critics Society	January 17, 2022	Best Original Score	Jonny Greenwood	Nominated	
St. Louis Film Critics Association	December 19, 2021	Best Score	Jonny Greenwood	Nominated	
Washington D.C. Area Film Critics Association	December 6, 2021	Best Score	Jonny Greenwood	Nominated	
