= Jonny Greenwood =

English musician (born 1971)

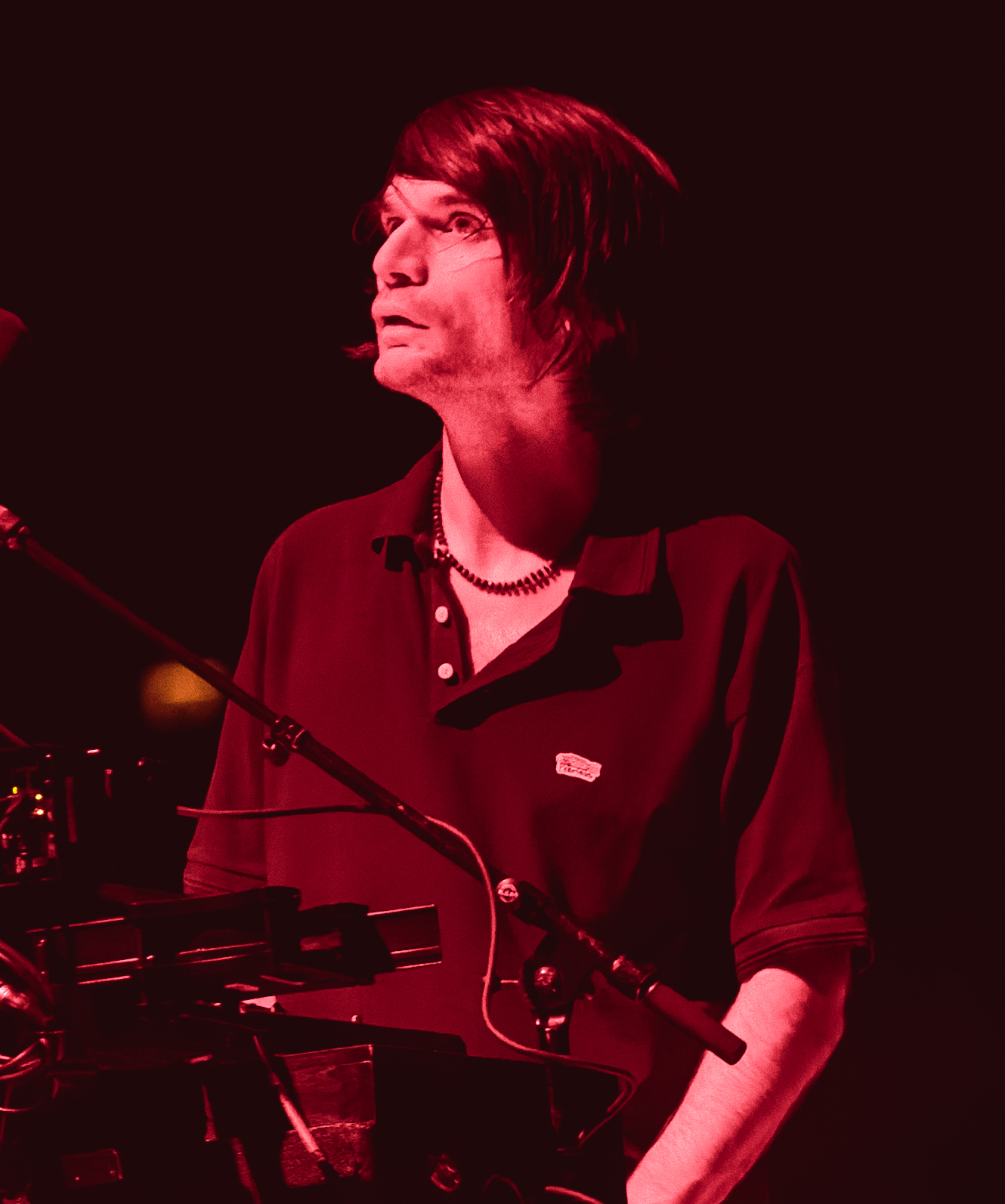
- Greenwood performing with Radiohead in 2025

Background information
- Born: Jonathan Richard Guy Greenwood; 5 November 1971 (age 55); Oxford, England
- Genres: Alternative rock; electronica; art rock; experimental rock; classical
- Occupations: Musician; composer
- Instruments: Guitar; keyboards; ondes Martenot; bass
- Years active: 1985–present
- Labels: Nonesuch; XL; Parlophone; WEA; Trojan; Sanctuary; Capitol; Lakeshore
- Member of: Radiohead; the Smile

Jonathan Richard Guy Greenwood (born 5 November 1971) is an English musician who is the lead guitarist of the rock band Radiohead. He has also composed numerous film scores. He has been named one of the greatest guitarists by multiple publications.

Greenwood formed Radiohead at school with friends and his elder brother, Colin. Their debut single, "Creep" (1992), featured Greenwood's aggressive guitar work. He described his role in Radiohead as an arranger, helping transform Thom Yorke's demos into finished songs. Radiohead have sold more than 30 million albums, and Greenwood was inducted into the Rock and Roll Hall of Fame as a member of the band in 2019.

Greenwood is a multi-instrumentalist and a player of the ondes Martenot, an early electronic instrument. He uses electronic techniques such as programming, sampling and looping, and writes music software. The only classically trained member of Radiohead, Greenwood has composed for orchestras including the London Contemporary Orchestra and the BBC Concert Orchestra, and his arrangements feature on Radiohead records. He has collaborated with Indian and Middle Eastern musicians including the Israeli songwriters Shye Ben Tzur and Dudu Tassa. In 2021, Greenwood debuted a new band, the Smile, with Yorke and the drummer Tom Skinner.

Greenwood released his first solo work, the soundtrack for the film Bodysong, in 2003. In 2007, he scored There Will Be Blood, the first of several collaborations with the director Paul Thomas Anderson. In 2018, he was nominated for an Academy Award for his score for Anderson's Phantom Thread. He was nominated again for his score for The Power of the Dog (2021), directed by Jane Campion, and his score for Anderson's One Battle After Another (2025). Greenwood also scored the Lynne Ramsay films We Need to Talk About Kevin (2011) and You Were Never Really Here (2017).

== Early life ==
Jonny Greenwood was born on 5 November 1971 in Oxford, England. His brother, the Radiohead bassist Colin Greenwood, is two years older. Their father served in the British Army as a bomb disposal expert. The Greenwood family has historical ties to the Communist Party of Great Britain and the socialist Fabian Society. Jonny said the family was "not musical at all" and that his parents did not appreciate rock music, but supported him and Colin by driving them to band rehearsals.

When he was a child, Greenwood's family would listen to a small number of cassettes in their car, including Mozart's horn concertos, the musicals Flower Drum Song and My Fair Lady, and cover versions of Simon & Garfunkel songs. When the cassettes were not playing, Greenwood would listen to the noise of the engine and try to recall every detail of the music. He credited his older siblings with exposing him to rock bands such as the Beat and New Order. The first gig Greenwood attended was the Fall on their 1988 Frenz Experiment tour, which he found "overwhelming".

The Greenwood brothers attended the private boys' school Abingdon. The Abingdon director of music, Michael Stinton, recalled Jonny as a "charming student" and "committed musician" who would spend as much time in the music department as possible. Greenwood's first instrument was a recorder given to him at age four or five. He played baroque music in recorder groups as a teenager, and continued to play into adulthood. He played the viola in the Thames Vale youth orchestra, which he described as a formative experience: "I'd been in school orchestras and never seen the point. But in Thames Vale I was suddenly with all these 18-year-olds who could actually play in tune. I remember thinking: 'Ah, that's what an orchestra is supposed to sound like!'" Greenwood also spent time programming, experimenting with BASIC and simple machine code to make computer games. According to Greenwood, "The closer I got to the bare bones of the computer, the more exciting I found it."

=== On a Friday ===
At Abingdon, the Greenwood brothers formed a band, On a Friday, with the singer Thom Yorke, the guitarist Ed O'Brien and the drummer Philip Selway. Jonny, the youngest, was three school years below Yorke and Colin and the last to join. He was previously in another band, Illiterate Hands, with Matt Hawksworth, Simon Newton, Ben Kendrick, Nigel Powell and Yorke's brother, Andy.

Greenwood initially played harmonica and keyboards for On a Friday. As they had fired their previous keyboardist for playing too loudly, Greenwood spent his first months playing with his keyboard turned off. No one in the band realised, and Yorke told him he added an "interesting texture". According to Greenwood, "I'd go home in the evening and work out how to actually play chords, and cautiously, over the next few months, I would start turning this keyboard up." According to Selway, at On a Friday's first gig, in Oxford’s Jericho Tavern, Greenwood sat on the stage with a harmonica, "waiting for his big moment to arrive". He eventually became the lead guitarist.

Although the other members of On a Friday had left Abingdon by 1987 to attend university, they continued to rehearse on weekends and holidays. Greenwood studied music at A Level, including chorale harmonisation.

== Career ==
=== 1991–1992: Pablo Honey ===
In 1991, the members of On a Friday regrouped in Oxford, sharing a house on the corner of Magdalen Road and Ridgefield Road. Greenwood played harmonica on the 1992 Blind Mr. Jones single "Crazy Jazz". He enrolled at Oxford Brookes University to study psychology and music, but left after his first term after On a Friday signed a record contract deal with EMI. Greenwood said he had been "headed for the back of the viola section at some minor orchestra".

The band changed their name to Radiohead and released their first album, Pablo Honey, in 1993. Radiohead found early success with their debut single, "Creep", released in 1992. According to Rolling Stone, "It was Greenwood's gnashing noise blasts that marked Radiohead as more than just another mopey band ... An early indicator of his crucial role in pushing his band forward." The Independent wrote that it was "the kind of transformative moment that has become his signature contribution to the Radiohead style".

=== 1995–1999: The Bends and OK Computer ===
Radiohead's second album, The Bends (1995), brought them significant critical attention. Greenwood said it had been a "turning point" for Radiohead: "It started appearing in people's [best of] polls for the end of the year. That's when it started to feel like we made the right choice about being a band." On tour, Greenwood damaged his hearing and wore protective ear shields for some performances.

Colin Greenwood, Jonny Greenwood, Ed O'Brien, and Phil Selway discussing OK Computer in 1997

Radiohead's third album, OK Computer (1997), achieved acclaim, showcasing Greenwood's lead guitar work on songs such as "Paranoid Android". For "Climbing up the Walls", Greenwood wrote a part for 16 stringed instruments playing quarter tones apart, inspired by the Polish composer Krzysztof Penderecki.

For the soundtrack of the 1998 film Velvet Goldmine, Greenwood, Yorke, Andy Mackay of Roxy Music and Bernard Butler of Suede formed a band, the Venus in Furs, and covered three Roxy Music songs. Greenwood played harmonica on "Platform Blues" and "Billie" on Pavement's final album, Terror Twilight (1999).

=== 2000–2003: Kid A, Amnesiac and Hail to the Thief ===
Radiohead's albums Kid A (2000) and Amnesiac (2001) marked a dramatic change in sound, incorporating influences from electronica, classical music, jazz and krautrock. Greenwood employed a modular synthesiser to build the drum machine rhythm of "Idioteque", and played ondes Martenot, an early electronic instrument similar to a theremin, on several tracks.

For "How to Disappear Completely", Greenwood composed a string section by multitracking his ondes Martenot playing. According to Radiohead's producer, Nigel Godrich, when the string players saw Greenwood's score "they all just sort of burst into giggles, because they couldn't do what he'd written, because it was impossible—or impossible for them, anyway". The orchestra leader, John Lubbock, encouraged the musicians to experiment and work with Greenwood's "naive" ideas. Greenwood also arranged strings for the Amnesiac songs "Pyramid Song" and "Dollars and Cents".

Greenwood played guitar on Bryan Ferry's 2002 album Frantic. For Radiohead's sixth album, Hail to the Thief (2003), Greenwood began using the music programming language Max to sample and manipulate the band's playing. After having used effects pedals heavily on previous albums, he challenged himself to create interesting guitar parts without effects.

=== 2003–2006: Bodysong and first orchestral work ===
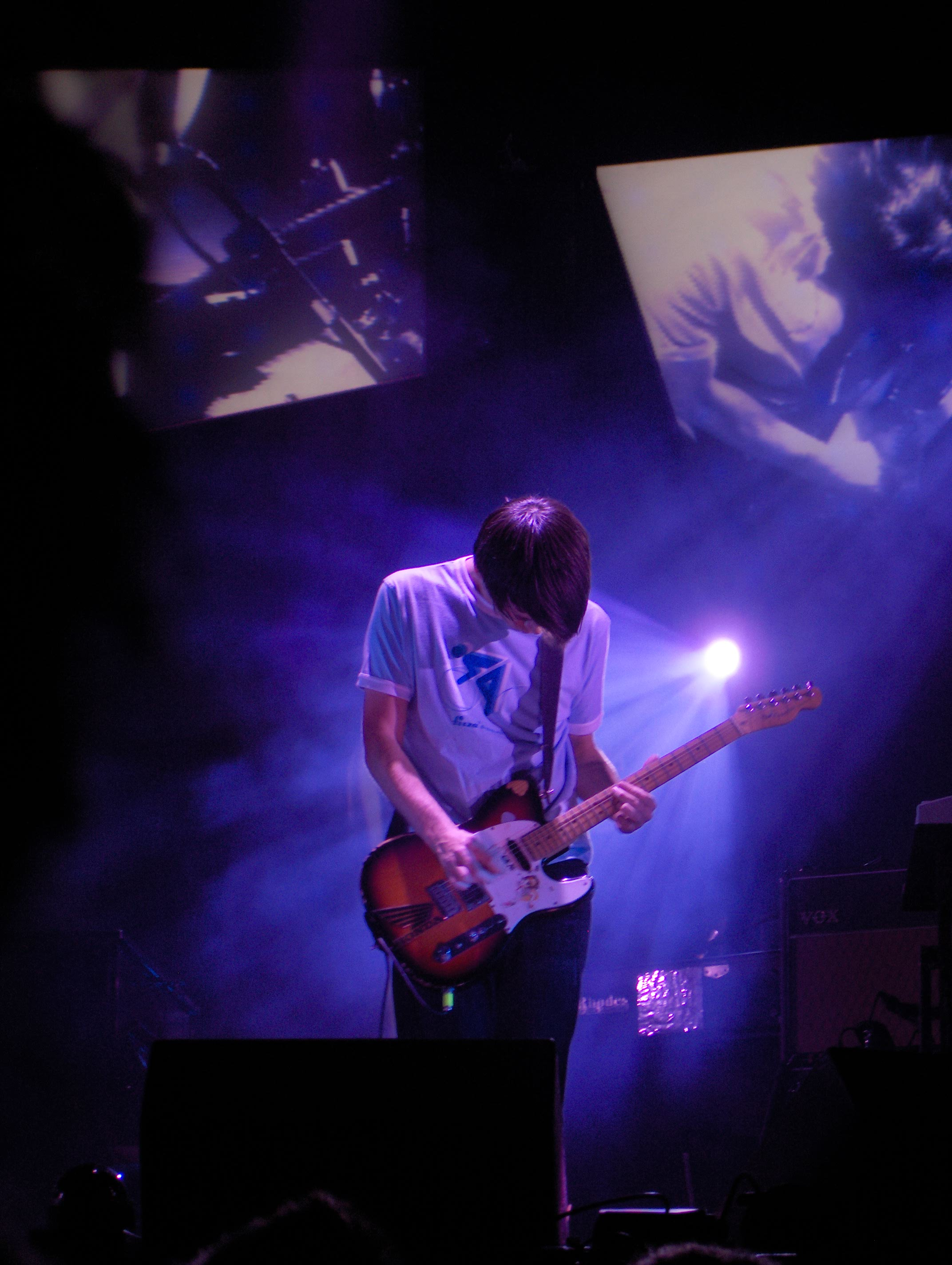
Greenwood performing with Radiohead in 2006

In 2003, Greenwood released his first solo work, the soundtrack for the documentary film Bodysong. It incorporates guitar, jazz, and classical music. Greenwood played instruments such as the ondes Martenot, banjo, glass harmonica and vocoder, and employed the Gerard Presencer jazz quartet. In 2004, Greenwood and Yorke contributed to the Band Aid 20 single "Do They Know It's Christmas?", produced by Godrich.

Greenwood's first work for orchestra, Smear, was premiered by the London Sinfonietta in March 2004. In 2005, Greenwood curated a concert as part of the Ether festival in London at with the London Sinfonietta. It featured a new version of Smear, the new work Piano for Children, and performances of pieces by classical modernist composers. With the orchestra, Greenwood also performed two Radiohead songs with Yorke: "Where Bluebirds Fly" and "Weird Fishes / Arpeggi".

In May 2004, Greenwood was appointed composer-in-residence to the BBC Concert Orchestra. Radiohead's co-manager, Bryce Edge, said Greenwood would use the residency to learn how orchestras work. For the BBC, Greenwood wrote "Popcorn Superhet Receiver" (2005), inspired by radio static and the elaborate, dissonant tone clusters of Penderecki's Threnody to the Victims of Hiroshima (1960). He wrote it by recording individual tones on viola, then manipulating and overdubbing them in Pro Tools. For "Popcorn Superhet Receiver", Greenwood was named Composer of the Year by BBC Radio 3.

For the 2005 film Harry Potter and the Goblet of Fire, Greenwood and the Radiohead drummer, Philip Selway, appeared as the wizard rock band Weird Sisters alongside Jarvis Cocker, Steve Mackey, Steven Claydon and Jason Buckle. They recorded three songs for the soundtrack and appeared in the film. Greenwood contributed piano to "The Eraser" from Yorke's debut solo album, The Eraser (2006).

=== 2007–2010: There Will Be Blood and In Rainbows ===
Greenwood composed the score for the 2007 film There Will Be Blood, directed by Paul Thomas Anderson. The soundtrack won an award at the Critics' Choice Awards and the Best Film Score award in the Evening Standard British Film Awards for 2007. As it contains excerpts from "Popcorn Superhet Receiver", it was ineligible for an Academy Award for Best Original Score. Rolling Stone named There Will Be Blood the best film of the decade and described the score as "a sonic explosion that reinvented what film music could be". In 2016, the film composer Hans Zimmer said the score was "recklessly, crazily beautiful".

In March 2007, Trojan Records released Jonny Greenwood Is the Controller, a compilation album of reggae tracks curated by Greenwood. It features mostly 70s roots and dub tracks from artists including Lee "Scratch" Perry, Joe Gibbs and Linval Thompson. The title references Thompson's track "Dread Are the Controller".

Radiohead released their seventh album, In Rainbows, in October 2007, in a landmark use of the pay-what-you-want model for music sales. Greenwood said Radiohead were responding to the culture of downloading free music, which he likened to the legend of King Canute: "You can't pretend the flood isn't happening." Greenwood wrote the title music for Adam Buxton's 2008 sketch show Meebox, and contributed to the 2009 album Basof Mitraglim Le'Hakol by the Israeli rock musician Dudu Tasaa. Greenwood cowrote Yorke's 2009 single "Feeling Pulled Apart by Horses".

=== 2010–2013: Norwegian Wood and The King of Limbs ===
In February 2010, Greenwood debuted a new composition, "Doghouse", at the BBC's Maida Vale Studios, written in hotels and dressing rooms while on tour with Radiohead. He expanded "Doghouse" into the score for the Japanese film Norwegian Wood, released later that year. Greenwood and Yorke performed a surprise set at Glastonbury Festival 2010, performing Radiohead and Eraser songs. Greenwood also played guitar on Bryan Ferry's 2010 album Olympia.

Radiohead's recorded their eighth album, The King of Limbs (2011), using sampler software written by Greenwood. By 2011, Radiohead had sold more than 30 million albums. That year, Greenwood scored We Need to Talk About Kevin, directed by Lynne Ramsay, using instruments including a wire-strung harp. With Yorke, he also collaborated with the rapper MF Doom on the track "Retarded Fren".

In 2012, Greenwood composed the score for Anderson's film The Master. That March, Greenwood and the Polish composer Krzysztof Penderecki, one of Greenwood's greatest influences, released an album comprising Penderecki's 1960s compositions Polymorphia and Threnody for the Victims of Hiroshima, Greenwood's "Popcorn Superhet Receiver", and a new work by Greenwood, "48 Responses to Polymorphia".

In the same year, Greenwood accepted a three-month residency with the Australian Chamber Orchestra in Sydney and composed a new piece, "Water". Greenwood, Yorke, and other artists contributed music to The UK Gold, a 2013 documentary about tax avoidance in the UK. The soundtrack was released free in February 2015 through the online audio platform SoundCloud.

=== 2014–2016: Inherent Vice, Junun and A Moon Shaped Pool ===
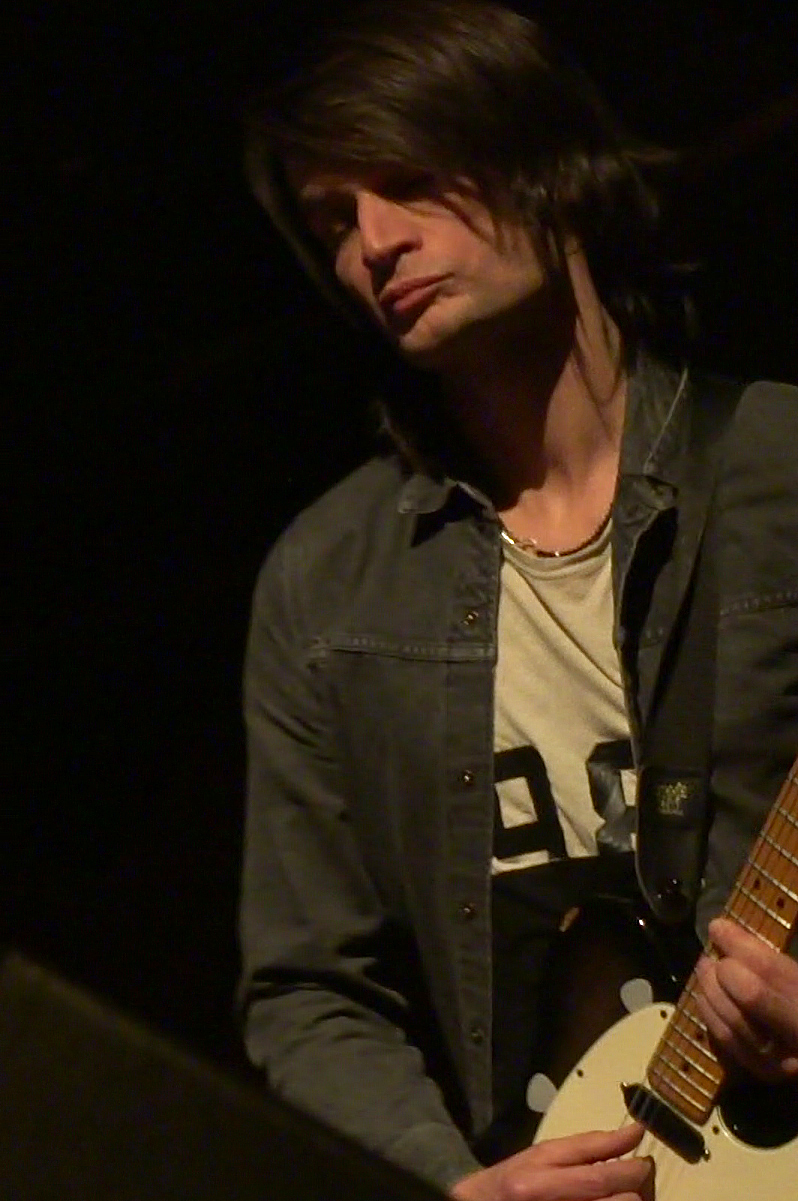
Greenwood performing with the London Contemporary Orchestra in Geneva, 2015

Greenwood composed the soundtrack for the Anderson film Inherent Vice (2014). It features a new version of an unreleased Radiohead song, "Spooks", performed by Greenwood and two members of Supergrass. In 2014, Greenwood performed with the London Contemporary Orchestra, performing selections from his soundtracks alongside new compositions. In the same year, Greenwood performed with the Israeli composer Shye Ben Tzur and his band. Greenwood described Ben Tzur's music as "quite celebratory, more like gospel music than anything—except that it's all done to a backing of Indian harmoniums and percussion". He said he would play a "supportive" rather than "solistic" role. Greenwood recorded a version of the 1987 composition "Electric Counterpoint" by Steve Reich for Reich's 2014 album Radio Rewrite.

In 2015, Greenwood, Ben Tzur and Godrich recorded an album, Junun, with the Rajasthan Express at Mehrangarh Fort in Rajasthan, India. Greenwood insisted they hire only musicians from Rajasthan and only use string instruments native to the region. Ben Tzur wrote the songs, with Greenwood contributing guitar, bass, keyboards, ondes Martenot and programming. Whereas western music is based on harmonies and chord progressions, Greenwood used North Indian ragas. Greenwood and Godrich said they wanted to avoid the "obsession" with high fidelity in recording world music, and instead hoped to capture the "dirt" and "roughness" of music in India. The recording is the subject of a 2015 documentary, Junun, by Paul Thomas Anderson.

Greenwood contributed string orchestration to Frank Ocean's 2016 albums Endless and Blonde. Radiohead's ninth album, A Moon Shaped Pool, was released in May 2016, featuring strings and choral vocals arranged by Greenwood and performed by the London Contemporary Orchestra. Greenwood, Ben Tzur and the Rajasthan Express were a support act on Radiohead's 2018 Moon Shaped Pool tour.

=== 2017–2020: Phantom Thread and The Power of the Dog ===
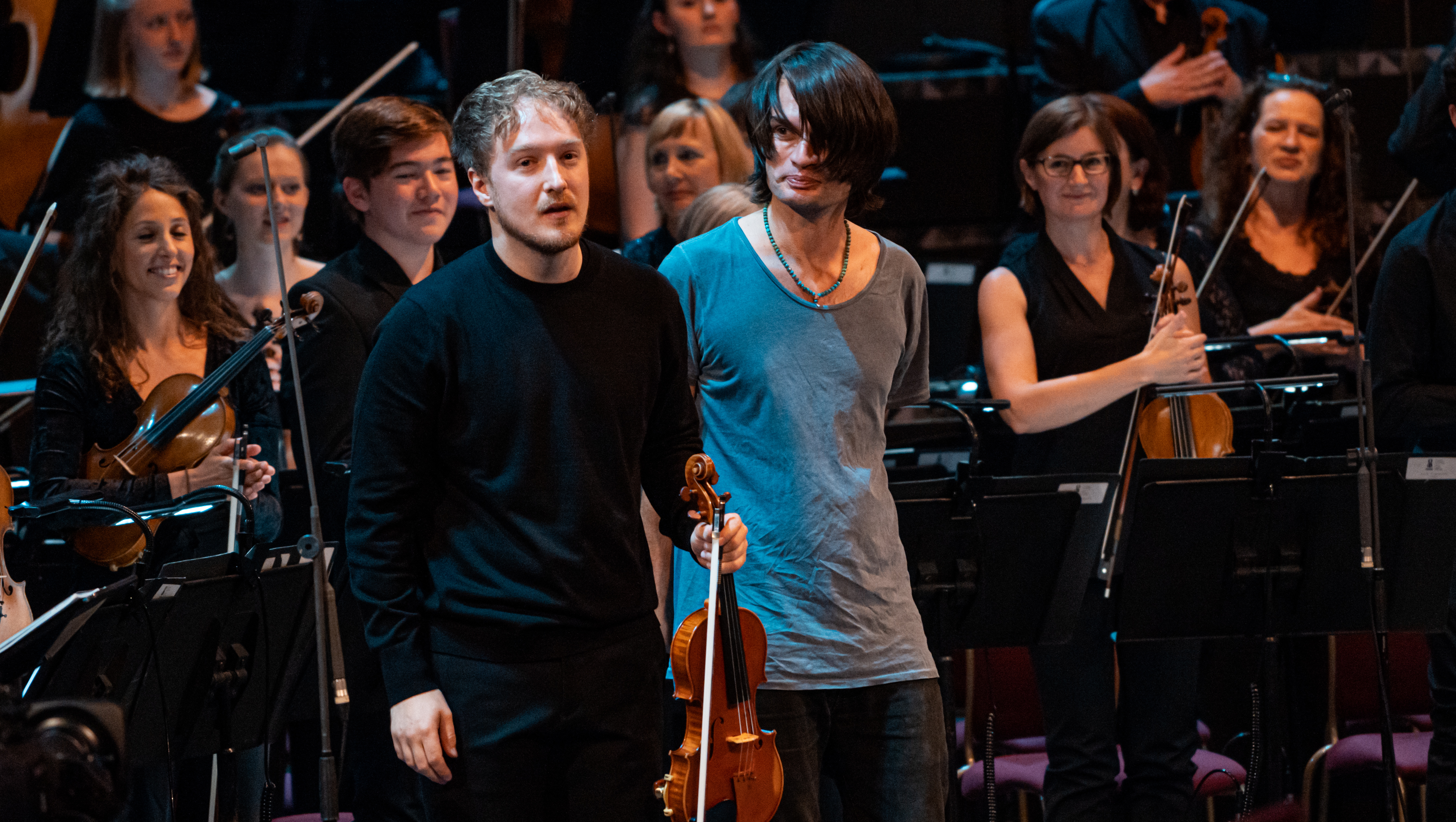
Greenwood receiving an ovation after a performance of his piece "Horror Vacui "at the BBC Proms in London, 2019

Greenwood wrote the score for Anderson's 2017 film Phantom Thread. It was nominated for an Academy Award and earned Greenwood his sixth Ivor Novello award. Greenwood reunited with Ramsay to score her film You Were Never Really Here, also released in 2017. That August, Yorke and Jonny Greenwood performed a benefit concert near Greenwood's home in Marche, Italy, to help restoration efforts following the August 2016 Central Italy earthquake. At the 2019 BBC Proms in London, Greenwood debuted his composition "Horror Vacui" for solo violin and 68 string instruments.

Greenwood was inducted into the Rock and Roll Hall of Fame as a member of Radiohead in March 2019. Greenwood did not attend the event, and told Rolling Stone: "I don't care. Maybe it's a cultural thing that I really don't understand ... It's quite a self-regarding profession anyway. And anything that heightens that just makes me feel even more uncomfortable." In September, Greenwood launched a record label, Octatonic Records, to release contemporary classical music by soloists and small groups he had met as a film composer. In 2021, he expressed uncertainty about releasing further Octatonic records, as the two Octatonic records "seemed to not really connect with anybody". In 2024, Greenwood said he planned to revive Octatonic with a release from the cellist Oliver Coates.

For the soundtrack for The Power of the Dog (2021), Greenwood played the cello in the style of a banjo and recorded a piece for player piano controlled with the software Max. It earned Greenwood his second Academy Award nomination. For his soundtrack to Spencer (2021), Greenwood combined Baroque and jazz music, juxtaposing their "rigid" and "colourful" styles. He also contributed cues to Anderson's 2021 film Licorice Pizza.

=== 2021–2023: the Smile and Jarak Qaribak ===
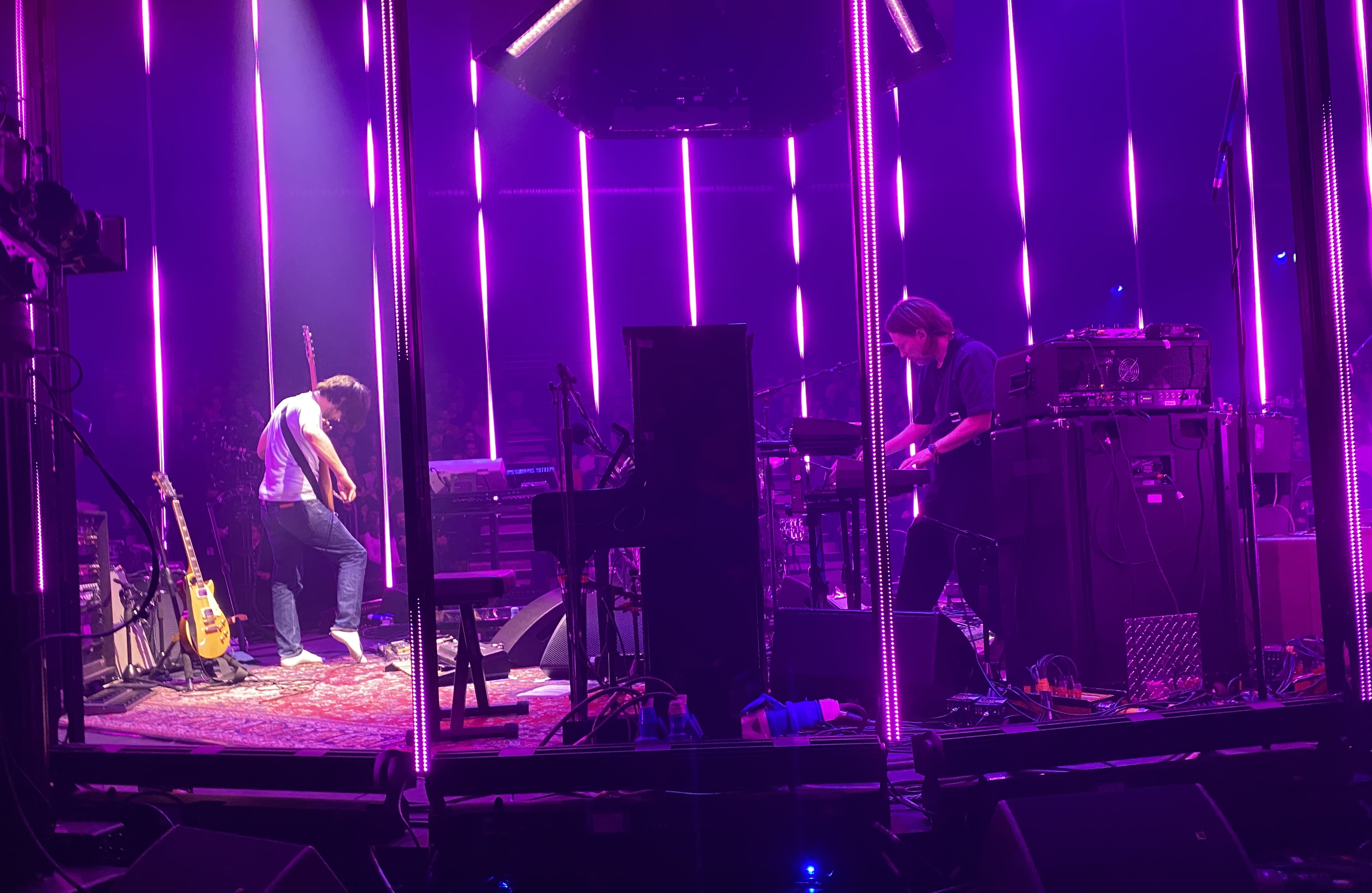
Greenwood (left) performing with the Smile in January 2022

In 2021, Greenwood debuted a new band, the Smile, with Yorke and the jazz drummer Tom Skinner. Greenwood said the project was a way for him and Yorke to work together during the COVID-19 lockdowns. Pitchfork attributed the Smile to Greenwood's frustration with Radiohead's slow working pace and his desire to release records that are "90 percent as good [that] come out twice as often". The Smile made their surprise debut in a performance streamed by Glastonbury Festival on 22 May, with Greenwood playing guitar and bass.

The Guardian critic Alexis Petridis said the Smile "sound like a simultaneously more skeletal and knottier version of Radiohead", exploring more progressive rock influences with unusual time signatures, complex riffs and "hard-driving" motorik psychedelia. In May 2022, the Smile released their debut album, A Light for Attracting Attention, and began an international tour. Greenwood and Yorke contributed music to the sixth series of the television drama Peaky Blinders, broadcast that year.

Greenwood composed and conducted strings for the Pretenders song "I Think About You Daily", released in June 2023. On 9 June, Greenwood and the Israeli musician Dudu Tassa released Jarak Qaribak, comprising reworkings of Middle Eastern love songs. It was produced by Greenwood and Tassa and mixed by Godrich, and features several Middle Eastern musicians. Greenwood said he and Tassa had "tried to imagine what Kraftwerk would have done if they'd been in Cairo in the 1970s". He denied any intent to make a political point with the album, and said: "I do understand that as soon as you do anything in that part of the world it becomes political ... possibly especially if it's artistic." A European tour for Jarak Qaribak was canceled following the outbreak of the Gaza war in 2023.

=== 2024: Wall of Eyes and Cutouts ===
In January 2024, the Smile released their second album, Wall of Eyes. They began a European tour in March. In May, a drone-based composition by Greenwood for church organ, "X Years of Reverb" — where X is substituted for the age of the building in which it is performed – premiered at the Norfolk and Norwich Festival. The composition is eight hours long and was performed by the organists James McVinnie and Eliza McCarthy playing in shifts using stopwatches. Greenwood composed it after becoming involved in charities to repair churches in Marche damaged by the 2016 earthquake.

On 25 May, Greenwood joined protests in Israel calling for the removal of Prime Minister Benjamin Netanyahu, elections for new leadership, and the release of hostages held by Hamas in Gaza. The next day, he and Tassa performed songs from Jarak Qaribak in Tel Aviv. The performance was criticised by pro-Palestine activists; the Palestinian Campaign for the Academic and Cultural Boycott of Israel called for "peaceful, creative pressure on his band Radiohead to convincingly distance itself from this blatant complicity in the crime of crimes, or face grassroots measures". On 4 June, Greenwood responded in a statement that Israeli artists should not be silenced. He described the project as a group of Middle Eastern musicians "working together across borders" and made no mention of Israel's war on Gaza.

In July, the Smile canceled their upcoming European tour after Greenwood was temporarily hospitalised with a serious infection. In a statement, the Smile said Greenwood had been receiving emergency treatment in an intensive care unit, but was now safe. In October, Greenwood said he was mostly recovered and was focusing on film soundtracks until he was fully well. The Smile's third album, Cutouts, recorded simultaneously with Wall of Eyes, was released that month.

=== 2025–present: One Battle After Another and Ranjha ===
Greenwood (right) and Yorke at the O2 Arena, London, on Radiohead's 2025 tour

In May 2025, Greenwood and Tassa's performances in Bristol and London supporting Jarak Qaribak were canceled following threats to the venues and staff. They released a statement criticising the cancellations as censorship, emphasised the mixed heritage of the performers, and compared the cancellations to the controversy surrounding the hip-hop group Kneecap following their Coachella 2025 performance. In an interview later that year, Yorke said he would not perform in Israel again, while Greenwood disagreed, saying Israel boycotts empower the government to act as they please. He said he was "ashamed of dragging [his Radiohead bandmates] into this mess", but was not ashamed of working with Arab and Jewish musicians.

Greenwood scored his sixth film for Paul Thomas Anderson, One Battle After Another, released in September 2025. It features military drums played with computer-controlled robotic beaters. It earned Greenwood his third Academy Award nomination. In November 2025, Radiohead began a European tour, their first tour in seven years. In February 2026, Greenwood and Anderson released a statement saying the 2026 documentary film Melania contained unauthorised use of Greenwood's Phantom Thread score and that they had asked for its removal.

A second album by Greenwood, Ben Tzur and the Rajasthan Express, Ranjha, was released in May. It features Greenwood's Smile bandmate Tom Skinner and was produced by the Smile producer Sam Petts-Davies in Greenwood's Oxfordshire studio. The group began writing new music while supporting Radiohead in 2017 and 2018, but work was postponed by the COVID-19 pandemic. Greenwood and Tassa's second Jarak Qaribak album, Jalsa, is due for release in December 2026. The lead single, "Ya Hala Bid-Dayf", was released in November.

== Musicianship ==
=== Guitar ===
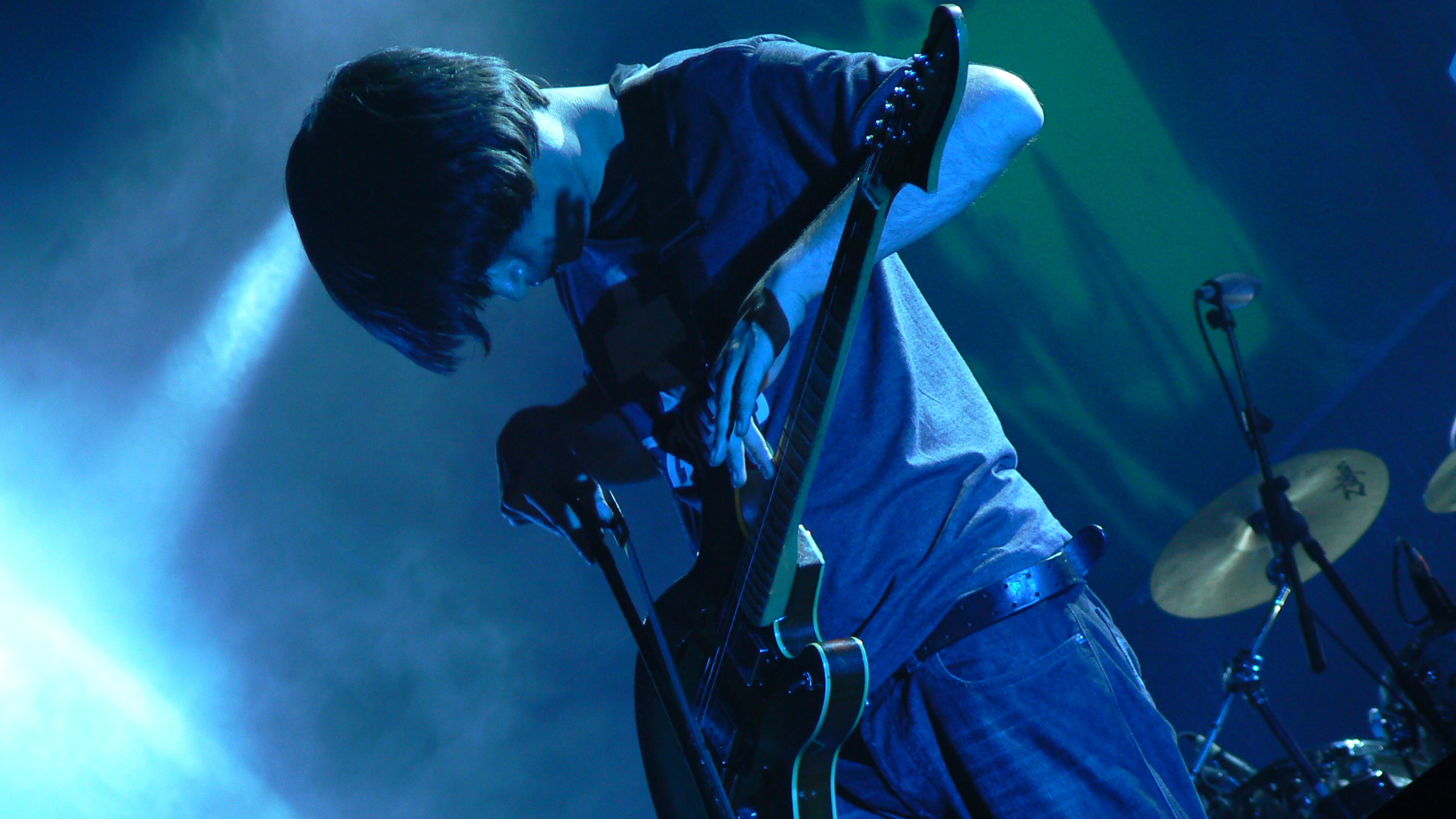
Greenwood playing bowed guitar

Greenwood is Radiohead's lead guitarist. He is known for his aggressive playing style. Guitar.com wrote that Greenwood's playing on Radiohead's debut album, Pablo Honey, was an "exhilarating melange of tremolo-picked soundscapes, chunky octaves, screaming high-register runs and killswitch antics". In the 1990s, Greenwood developed repetitive strain injury, necessitating a brace on his right arm, which he likened to "taping up your fingers before a boxing match".

Greenwood said he dislikes the reputation of guitars as something to be "admired or worshipped", and instead sees them as a tool like a typewriter or a vacuum cleaner. He said he disliked guitar solos: "There's nothing worse than hearing someone cautiously going up and down the scales of their guitar. You can hear them thinking about what the next note should be, and then out it comes. It's more interesting to write something that doesn't outstay its welcome." He said he sometimes wrote guitar solos by "playing guitar without any thought and treating it like wires on a box strung across a pickup", but that he was also grateful for his music theory education.

With Radiohead, Greenwood's main amplifiers are a Vox AC30 and a Fender 85. He has long used a Fender Telecaster Plus, a model of Telecaster with Lace Sensor pickups. He uses a killswitch to create a stuttering effect on songs such as "Airbag", "Paranoid Android" and "Electioneering". On softer tracks, such as "Street Spirit (Fade Out)" and "Pyramid Song", Greenwood plays a Fender Starcaster, which he sometimes plays with a cello bow. For solo performances and his work with the Smile, he plays a Gibson Les Paul and a Fender Precision Bass, using an aggressive picking style.

For distorted tones on many 1990s Radiohead songs, Greenwood uses the Marshall ShredMaster. For the "My Iron Lung" riff, he uses a DigiTech Whammy pedal to pitch-shift his guitar by one octave, creating a "glitchy, lo-fi" sound. He has used a Roland RE-201 Space Echo unit on several albums. On "Identikit" and several Smile songs, Greenwood uses a delay effect to create "angular" synchronised repeats. Greenwood said that "treating the delay as [the guitar's] equal opened up lots of directions".

In 2008, Guitar World named Greenwood's guitar solo in "Paranoid Android" the 34th-greatest of all time. In 2010, NME named Greenwood one of the greatest living guitarists, and he was voted the seventh-greatest of all time in a poll of more than 30,000 BBC 6 Music listeners. That year, the Rolling Stone journalist David Fricke named Greenwood the 60th-greatest. In 2011, a panel of musicians and Rolling Stone writers voted him the 48th-greatest, and in 2012 Spin ranked him the 29th. In its updated 2023 list of the greatest guitarists, Rolling Stone ranked Greenwood and O'Brien joint 43rd, writing: "Even as he blossomed into a noted neo-classical composer, Greenwood always made sure to throw in at least one brain-scrambling banger of a guitar part per album."

=== Ondes Martenot ===
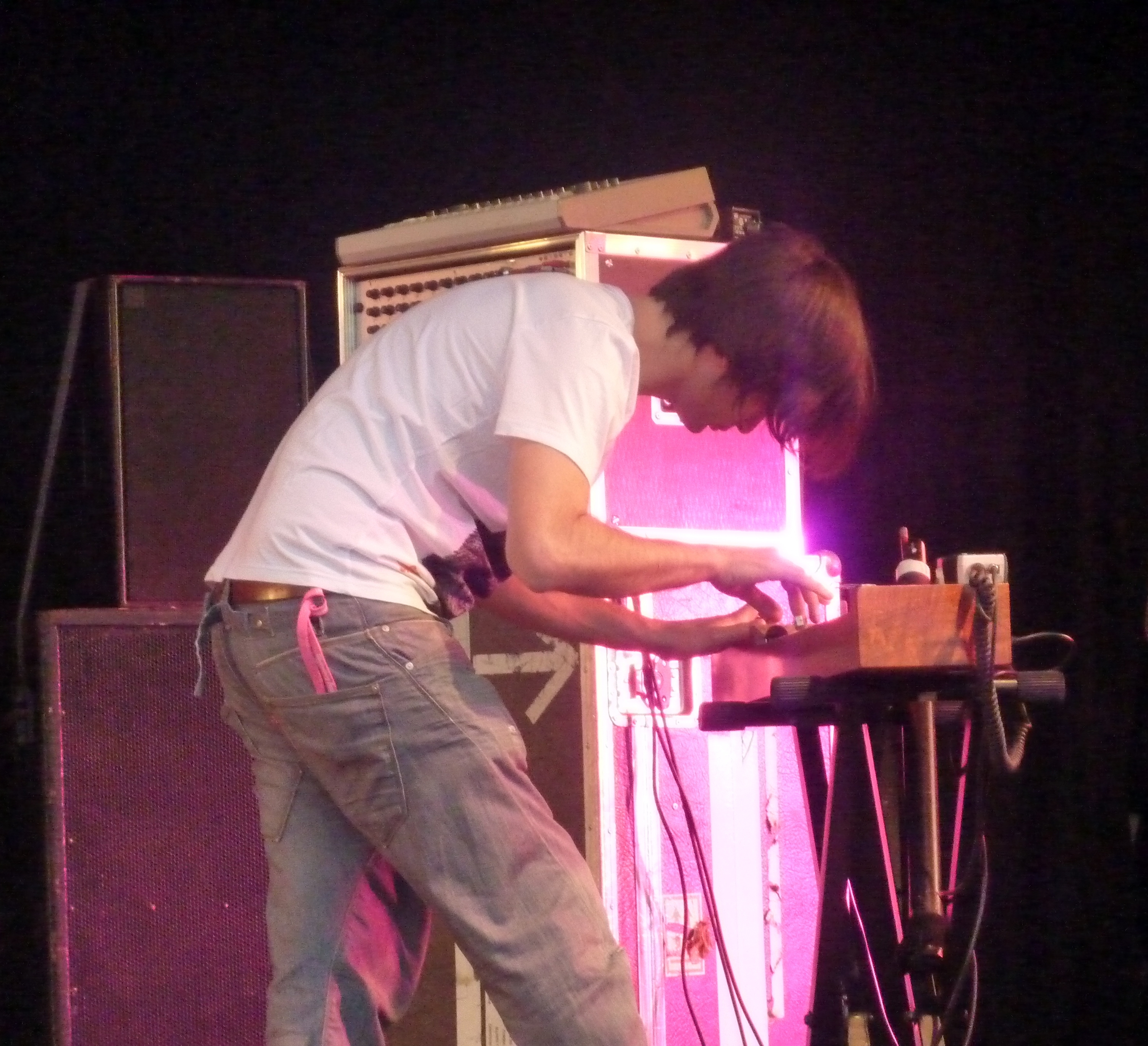
Greenwood performing on an ondes Martenot in 2010

Greenwood is a player of the ondes Martenot, an early electronic instrument played by moving a ring along a wire, creating sounds similar to a theremin. Greenwood said it was "the most expressive electronic instrument that's ever been invented". He first used it on Radiohead's 2000 album Kid A, and it appears in Radiohead songs including "The National Anthem", "How to Disappear Completely" and "Where I End and You Begin".

Greenwood became interested in the ondes Martenot at the age of 15 after hearing Olivier Messiaen's Turangalîla Symphony. He said he was partly attracted to the instrument as he cannot sing: "I've always wanted to be able to play an instrument that was like singing, and there's nothing closer." As production of the ondes Martenot ceased in 1988, Greenwood had a replica created to take on tour with Radiohead in 2001 for fear of damaging his original model.

=== Other instruments ===
Greenwood plays instruments including piano, viola, cello, glockenspiel, harmonica, recorder, organ, banjo and harp. He said he enjoyed "struggling with instruments I can't really play", and that he enjoyed playing glockenspiel with Radiohead as much as he did guitar.

For the Kid A song "Idioteque", Greenwood created the rhythm with a modular synthesiser and sampled the four-chord synthesiser phrase from "mild und leise", a computer music piece by Paul Lansky. He uses a Kaoss Pad to manipulate Yorke's vocals during performances of the Kid A song "Everything in Its Right Place". In 2014, Greenwood wrote of his fascination with Indian instruments, particularly the tanpura, which he felt created uniquely complex "walls" of sounds. He uses a "home-made sound machine" comprising small hammers striking objects including yoghurt cartons, tubs, bells, and tambourines. He has used found sounds, using a television and a transistor radio on "Climbing Up the Walls" (from OK Computer) and "The National Anthem" (from Kid A).

=== Software ===
At the suggestion of Radiohead's producer, Nigel Godrich, Greenwood began using the music programming language Max. He found it liberating to abandon existing notions of audio effects and create his own from scratch, thinking "in terms of sound and maths". Examples of Greenwood's use of Max include the processed piano on the Moon Shaped Pool track "Glass Eyes" and his signature "stutter" guitar effect used on tracks such as the 2003 single "Go to Sleep". He used Max to write sampling software used to create Radiohead's eighth album, The King of Limbs.

=== Songwriting ===
"People from my background are made to feel that it's wrong to have opinions about classical music ... So I found it quite healthy, particularly at school, to think about classical composers and rock bands in the same way. The reason I loved Messiaen, for instance, was that he was still alive and writing. To me that was as exciting as a great old rock band still being around. Same with Penderecki. His strange orchestral music was quite dark, but it felt similar to the strange electronic music coming out of Manchester."

— Greenwood on his love of classical and rock music (2010)

Greenwood is the only classically trained member of Radiohead. The New York Times described him as "the guy who can take an abstract Thom Yorke notion and master the tools required to execute it in the real world". In 2016, Greenwood described his role in Radiohead as an arranger, and said: "It's not really about can I do my guitar part now, it's more ... What will serve this song best? How do we not mess up this really good song? ... How do we make it better than [Yorke] just playing it by himself, which is already usually quite great?" He said he was the most impatient member of Radiohead: "I'd much rather the records were 90 per cent as good, but come out twice as often ... I've always felt that, the closer to the finish, the smaller the changes are that anyone would notice."

Greenwood's major writing contributions to Radiohead include "Just" (which Yorke described as "a competition by me and Jonny to get as many chords as possible into a song"); "My Iron Lung", co-written with Yorke, from The Bends (1995); "The Tourist" and the "rain down" bridge of "Paranoid Android" from OK Computer (1997); the vocal melody of "Kid A" from Kid A (2000); and the guitar melody of "A Wolf at the Door" from Hail to the Thief (2003).

For his film soundtracks, Greenwood attempts to keep the instrumentation contemporary to the period of the story. For example, he recorded the Norwegian Wood soundtrack using a 1960s Japanese nylon-strung guitar with home recording equipment from the period, attempting to create a recording that one of the characters might have made. Many of Greenwood's compositions are microtonal. He often uses modes of limited transposition, particularly the octatonic scale, saying: "I like to know what I can't do and then work inside that." Greenwood has used unusual notation for his scores to convey complexities such as microtonality or improvisation. His piece "X Years of Reverb" requires organists to play to stopwatches. For "48 Responses to Polymorphia", he placed an oak leaf on a stave and wrote a part using the veins.

=== Influences ===
Greenwood admires the alternative rock bands Pavement, the Pixies and Sonic Youth. He said the guitarist that had most influenced him was John McGeoch of Magazine, whose songwriting "informs so much of what [Radiohead] do". He declined an offer to fill in for McGeoch, who died in 2004, during Magazine's 2009 reunion tour. According to the Radiohead collaborator Adam Buxton, Jonny was "overwhelmed" and too shy to accept the role.

Greenwood first heard Olivier Messiaen's Turangalîla Symphony at the age of 15 and became "round-the-bend-obsessed with it". Messiaen was Greenwood's "first connection" to classical music. He said: "He was still alive when I was 15, and for whatever reason I felt I could equate him with my other favourite bands—there was no big posthumous reputation to put me off. So I'm still very fond of writing things in the same modes of limited transposition that he used."

Greenwood admires the Polish composer Krzysztof Penderecki, and cited a concert of Penderecki's music in the early 90s as a "conversion experience". He is also a fan of the composers György Ligeti, Henri Dutilleux and Steve Reich. He has performed Reich's 1987 guitar composition Electric Counterpoint and recorded a version for Reich's 2014 album Radio Rewrite. He cited Reich as an influence on the phasing guitars of the Radiohead songs "Let Down" and "Weird Fishes / Arpeggi". Greenwood cited the jazz musician Alice Coltrane as an influence.

Greenwood was exposed to Middle Eastern music through his wife's family. He said he particularly admired the textures and complexity of the rhythms in songs such as those by Abdel Halim Hafez, which he tried to emulate. He also said he enjoyed their rhythmic ambiguity, when it is difficult to tell where the first beat in a bar is.

== Personal life ==
Greenwood is married to the Israeli visual artist Sharona Katan, whom he met in 1993 when Radiohead performed in Israel. Her work, credited as Shin Katan, appears on the covers of Junun and several of Greenwood's soundtracks. Their three children are raised Jewish. Katan said: "We have a mezuzah in our house, we sometimes have Shabbos dinners, we celebrate Jewish holidays. The kids don't eat pork. It's important to me to keep this stuff." Greenwood's nephew served in the Israel Defence Forces and was killed in the ongoing Gaza war.

Greenwood's family live in Oxford and in Marche, Italy. In April 2023, Greenwood began selling olive oil produced on his farm in Italy from Radiohead's online shop.

== Discography ==
=== Collaborative albums ===
List of collaborative albums, with selected chart positions
Title	Details	Charts					
Title	Details	UK Sales	UK Indie	SCO	US Curr.	US Heat	US World
Threnody to the Victims of Hiroshima / Popcorn Superhet Receiver / Polymorphia / 48 Responses to Polymorphia (performed by Aukso Orchestra; conducted by Krzysztof Penderecki and Marek Moś)	Released: 13 March 2012; Label: Nonesuch; Formats: CD, download	–	–	–	–	–	–
Junun (with Shye Ben Tzur and the Rajasthan Express)	Released: 20 November 2015; Label: Nonesuch; Formats: LP, CD, cassette, download	–	–	–	–	6	3
Jarak Qaribak (with Dudu Tassa)	Released: 9 June 2023; Label: World Circuit; Formats: LP, CD, download	34	13	70	68	–	–
Ranjha (with Shye Ben Tzur and the Rajasthan Express)	Released: 8 May 2026; Label: World Circuit; Formats: LP, CD, download	–	–	–	–	–	–
Jalsa (with Dudu Tassa)	Release: 4 December 2026	–	–	–	–	–	–

=== Soundtracks ===
Title	Details	Charts		
Title	Details	US OST	US Heat	US Vinyl
Bodysong	Released: 27 October 2003; Label: Parlophone, Capitol, XL; Formats: LP, CD, download	—	—	—
There Will Be Blood	Released: 17 December 2007; Label: Nonesuch; Formats: LP, CD, download	20	—	21
Norwegian Wood	Released: 10 December 2010; Label: Nonesuch; Formats: CD, download	—	—	—
The Master	Released: 10 September 2012; Label: Nonesuch; Formats: LP, CD, download	21	28	—
Inherent Vice	Released: 15 December 2014; Label: Nonesuch; Formats: LP, CD, download	—	—	—
Phantom Thread	Released: 12 January 2018; Label: Nonesuch, WEA; Formats: LP, CD, download	—	—	—
You Were Never Really Here	Released: 9 March 2018; Label: Lakeshore, Invada; Formats: LP, CD, download	—	—	—
Spencer	Released: 12 November 2021; Label: Mercury KX; Formats: LP, CD, download	—	—	—
The Power of the Dog	Released: 17 November 2021; Label: Lakeshore, Invada; Formats: LP, CD, download	—	—	—
One Battle After Another	Released: 26 September 2025; Label: Nonesuch; Formats: LP, CD, download	—	—	—

=== Compilations ===
Title	Charts
Title	US Reggae
Jonny Greenwood Is the Controller (with Various Artists): Released: 6 March 2007; Label: Trojan, Sanctuary; Formats: CD, download	5

=== EPs ===
Title	Charts
Title	US Classical
Octatonic Volume 2: Industry Water (with Michael Gordon): Released: 24 September 2019; Label: Octatonic Records; Formats: Vinyl, download	10

=== Appearances ===
- 1992 – Blind Mr. Jones, "Crazy Jazz" – harmonica
- 1999 – Pavement, Terror Twilight – harmonica on "Platform Blues" and "Billie"
- 2002 – Bryan Ferry, Frantic – guitar
- 2006 – Thom Yorke, The Eraser – piano on "The Eraser"
- 2009 – Dudu Tassa – Basof Mitraglim Le'Hakol
- 2010 – Bryan Ferry, Olympia – guitar
- 2011 – We Need to Talk About Kevin – score
- 2014 – Steve Reich, Radio Rewrite – "Electric Counterpoint"
- 2016 – Frank Ocean, Endless – string arrangement
- 2016 – Frank Ocean, Blonde – string arrangement
- 2021 – Licorice Pizza (Official Motion Picture Soundtrack) – "Licorice Pizza"
- 2023 – The Pretenders, Relentless – string arrangement for "I Think About You Daily"
- 2024 – Dudu Tassa & the Kuwaitis, Dudu Tassa & the Kuwaitis (2024 Reissue) – "Eshrab Kasak Withana (Live)"

=== Concert works ===
- 2004 – smear for two ondes Martenots and chamber ensemble of nine players
- 2004 – Piano for Children for piano and orchestra (withdrawn)
- 2005 – Popcorn Superhet Receiver for string orchestra
- 2007 – There Will Be Blood live film version
- 2010 – Doghouse for string trio and orchestra
- 2011 – Suite from 'Noruwei no Mori' (Norwegian Wood) for orchestra
- 2011 – 48 Responses to Polymorphia for 48 solo strings, all doubling optional pacay bean shakers
- 2012 – Suite from 'There Will Be Blood' for string orchestra
- 2014 – Setting Up Arrows for string ensemble of 7 players
- 2014 – Water for two flutes, upright piano, chamber organ, two tanpura & string orchestra
- 2015 – 88 (No 1) for solo piano
- 2018 – Three Miniatures from 'Water' for violin, piano, 2 tampuras, and cello/bass drone
- 2019 – Horror vacui for solo violin and 68 strings (later withdrawn)
- 2024 – X Years of Reverb for organ
- 2025 – Violin Concerto - 'æþm' for solo violin and 56 solo strings

== See also ==
- List of Old Abingdonians
