= Jonny Greenwood Is the Controller =

2007 compilation album by various artists

Compilation album by various artists
- Released: 6 March 2007
- Genre: Dub, reggae
- Length: 69:15
- Label: Trojan Records

Professional ratings
Review scores
Source	Rating
Allmusic	4/5 stars
Music Box	4.5/5 stars
NME	(8/10)
Pitchfork	(8.4/10)

Jonny Greenwood Is the Controller is a compilation album created by the Radiohead guitarist Jonny Greenwood and released on Trojan Records. Released to commemorate Trojan Records' 40th anniversary, it collects Greenwood's favourite reggae and dub Trojan tracks, from artists including Lee "Scratch" Perry, Joe Gibbs, and Linval Thompson. The title references Thompson's track "Dread Are the Controller".

The album features artwork by the Radiohead artist Stanley Donwood. It received positive reviews.

== Track listing ==
1. "Dread Are the Controller" – Linval Thompson
2. "Let Me Down Easy" – Derrick Harriott
3. "I'm Still in Love (12" mix)" – Marcia Aitken
4. "Never Be Ungrateful (12" mix)" – Gregory Isaacs
5. "Bionic Rats" – Lee "Scratch" Perry
6. "Cool Rasta" – the Heptones
7. "Flash Gordon Meets Luke Skywalker" – Scientist & Jammy & the Roots Radics
8. "Black Panta" – Lee "Scratch" Perry & the Upsetters
9. "Fever" – Junior Byles
10. "Beautiful and Dangerous" – Desmond Dekker & the Aces
11. "Dread Dub (It Dread Out Deh Version)" – Lloyd's All Stars
12. "Gypsy Man" – Marcia Griffiths
13. "A Ruffer Version" – Johnny Clarke & the Aggrovators
14. "Right Road to Dubland (Right Road to Zion Dub)" – the Jahlights
15. "Dreader Locks" – Junior Byles & Lee Perry
16. "This Life Makes Me Wonder" – Delroy Wilson
17. "Clean Race" – Scotty
