= One Battle After Another (soundtrack) =

One Battle After Another (Original Motion Picture Soundtrack)

Film score by Jonny Greenwood
- Released: September 26, 2025
- Recorded: 2023–2025
- Genre: Film score
- Length: 48:53
- Label: Nonesuch
- Producer: Jonny Greenwood

Jonny Greenwood chronology
| Jarak Qaribak (2023) | One Battle After Another (Original Motion Picture Soundtrack) (2025) | Ranjha (2026) |

One Battle After Another (Original Motion Picture Soundtrack) is the film score to the 2025 film One Battle After Another, composed by Jonny Greenwood and released through Nonesuch Records on September 26, 2025.

== Development ==
One Battle After Another is Greenwood's sixth score for the director Paul Thomas Anderson. Greenwood was involved with the film since its inception and had the script since late 2023. He wrote music based on the script, and played to the finished film during production so that the team could get a sense of understanding on the tone and go along with the script. Anderson and Greenwood watched the dailies to use the musical pieces throughout the film.

Greenwood acquired military drums and played them with computer-controlled robotic beaters. He described the arrangement as "a sort of ghost percussion group in the room next door with all these drums on the floor and all of these cables leading to my laptop". Anderson said: "Jonny's music is always unique and special. We got a sneak preview of where this was going, what the tension was going to be, and what we needed to sustain, so it's a tremendous luxury to work like that, and it's because Jonny is steps ahead of us."

The film also features two musical cues written by Jon Brion, who worked on several previous Anderson films. The music came from Anderson's archive of unused music. The session drummer Matt Chamberlain said it came from an improv session he did with Brion and Jim Keltner several years prior. Other tracks include "Soldier Boy" by the Shirelles and "Hark! The Herald Angels Sing" sung by Ella Fitzgerald.

== Release ==
The film score was released through Nonesuch Records on September 26, 2025, the same day as the film's release in digital platforms. A physical edition of the album was released on November 14.

== Reception ==
Peter Bradshaw of The Guardian called the score "jolting, jangling, nerve-shredding". Brian Tallerico of RogerEbert.com wrote "More essential to the film's tone is a truly bonkers score by Jonny Greenwood, one that almost constructs themes for sections around sparsely played individual instruments. For a long stretch in the middle of the film, as Bob and Sergio evade Lockjaw's team, it sounds like a single piano key being struck, with the occasional flurry of what could be a cat running along the ivories. It's a remarkably effective choice, a score that almost sounds like an alarm going off somewhere." Owen Gleiberman of Variety wrote "Jonny Greenwood's modernist musical score pacing the film like a metronome of suspense."

Justin Chang of The New Yorker wrote that the score "veers between manic percolation—imagine a xylophone humping a coffeepot—and grandly operatic surges of synth. The music sweeps us up in the queasy thrill of revolt, but also in the heat and momentum of an impetuous romance." David Jenkins of Little White Lies wrote "Jonny Greenwood's score another blinder". Amy Nicholson of Los Angeles Times commented that "Jonny Greenwood's marvelously uneasy score of pounding piano, sounding at once improvised and insistent, hammers away as if trying to remember its own tune".

Barry Hertz of The Globe and Mail noted that the film is "buoyed by a jittery, jangly score by Anderson's long-time collaborator Jonny Greenwood that is electric enough to power the grids of several municipalities". Ross Bonalme of Collider wrote that "Greenwood, as always, completely overwhelms with his score. The use of strings held over an extended period of time sounds as though they could split at any second as the tension rises, and heightens pretty much every moment in the film. Greenwood's score is nearly omnipresent throughout the almost three hours, but it's never oppressive and always necessary in setting the tone."

== Track listing ==
All tracks written by Jonny Greenwood, except "Mean Alley" written by Jonny Greenwood and Thom Yorke.

| No. | Title | Length |
|---|---|---|
| 1. | "One Battle After Another" | 3:09 |
| 2. | "The French 75" | 1:30 |
| 3. | "Baktan Cross" | 2:59 |
| 4. | "Baby Charlene" | 3:16 |
| 5. | "Perfidia Beverly Hills" | 2:37 |
| 6. | "Mean Alley" | 2:46 |
| 7. | "I Need the Greeting Code" | 4:19 |
| 8. | "Ocean Waves" | 2:34 |
| 9. | "Guitar for Willa" | 3:35 |
| 10. | "Battle After Battle" | 2:36 |
| 11. | "Sisters of the Brave Beaver" | 3:01 |
| 12. | "Like Tom Fkn Cruise" | 3:25 |
| 13. | "Operation Boot Heel" | 2:12 |
| 14. | "Avanti Q" | 1:07 |
| 15. | "River of Hills" | 2:07 |
| 16. | "Greeting Code Reprise" | 0:53 |
| 17. | "Trust Device" | 3:51 |
| 18. | "Trio for Willa" | 3:04 |
| Total length: | | 48:53 |

== Additional music ==
The following songs were featured in the film, but not included in the soundtrack:

- Jon Brion – "Bunker Bumper"
- The Shirelles – "Soldier Boy"
- Steely Dan – "Dirty Work"
- The Ramsey Lewis Trio – "What Are You Doing New Year's Eve?"
- Sheck Wes – "Mo Bamba"
- Travis Scott ft. Kendrick Lamar – "Goosebumps"
- Walk the Moon – "Shut Up and Dance"
- El Fantasma ft. Banda Los Populares Del Llano – "Vengo A Aclarar"
- Survivor – "Eye of the Tiger"
- Ella Fitzgerald – "Hark! The Herald Angels Sing"
- Jackson 5 – "Ready or Not Here I Come (Can't Hide from Love)"
- Los Panchos – "Perfidia"
- Jon Brion – "Global Bully"
- Tom Petty and the Heartbreakers – "American Girl"
- Gil Scott-Heron – "The Revolution Will Not Be Televised"
- Ella Fitzgerald – "God Rest Ye Merry, Gentlemen"

== Charts ==
Chart performance for One Battle After Another (Original Motion Picture Soundtrack)
| Chart (2025–2026) | Peak position |
|---|---|
| UK Album Downloads (Official Charts) | 93 |
| UK Classical Albums (OCC) | 8 |
| UK Soundtrack Albums (Official Charts) | 5 |

== Release history ==
Release history and formats for One Battle After Another (Original Motion Picture Soundtrack)
| Region | Date | Format(s) | Label(s) | Ref. |
|---|---|---|---|---|
| Various | September 26, 2025 | Digital download; streaming | Nonesuch Records | |
| Various | November 14, 2025 | CD; LP | Nonesuch Records | |
