= There Will Be Blood (soundtrack) =

Soundtrack album by Jonny Greenwood
- Released: 17 December 2007
- Genres: Contemporary classical, avant-garde
- Length: 33:15
- Label: Nonesuch
- Producer: Graeme Stewart

Jonny Greenwood chronology
| Bodysong (2003) | There Will Be Blood (2007) | The Master (2012) |

There Will Be Blood is the soundtrack to the 2007 film of the same name and features an original orchestral score by Radiohead multi-instrumentalist Jonny Greenwood. The soundtrack was released on 17 December 2007 in the United Kingdom and on 18 December 2007 in the United States.

Although widely admired and thought of as a contender for the Academy Award for Best Original Score at the 2008 Academy Awards, it was ruled ineligible due to its use of pre-existing material. The score features elements from Greenwood's compositions 'Popcorn Superhet Receiver' and Bodysong (such as the track "Convergence", played atop the title track during the derrick fire sequence) and works from Arvo Pärt and the Violin Concerto in D by Johannes Brahms.

In December 2008, Greenwood's score was nominated for a Grammy in the category of "Best Score Soundtrack Album For Motion Picture, Television Or Other Visual Media" for the 51st Grammy Awards.

Nonesuch Records offers a digital download of three bonus tracks upon the purchase of the soundtrack from its web site.

Greenwood's wife, Israeli-born Sharona Katan (credited as Shin Katan), is a visual artist whose work appears on the cover as well as the booklet. The images were made with liquid photographic emulsion and oil paint, using the original anamorphic camera negatives from the film.

Professional ratings
Review scores
| Source | Rating |
|---|---|
| AllMusic | 5/5 stars |
| The A.V. Club | A− |
| Pitchfork | 8.1/10 |
| Film Music Magazine | A |
| PopMatters | 9/10 stars |
| Movie Music UK | 4/5 stars |
| Drowned In Sound | 7/10 |
| musicOMH | 4/5 stars |
| Sputnikmusic | 4.5/5 |

== Track listing ==
All tracks are written by Jonny Greenwood. "Henry Plainview" and "Proven Lands" feature excerpts from "Popcorn Superhet Receiver" by Greenwood.

| No. | Title | Length |
|---|---|---|
| 1. | "Open Spaces" | 3:55 |
| 2. | "Future Markets" | 2:41 |
| 3. | "Prospectors Arrive" | 4:34 |
| 4. | "Eat Him by His Own Light" | 2:41 |
| 5. | "Henry Plainview" | 4:14 |
| 6. | "There Will Be Blood" | 2:05 |
| 7. | "Oil" | 3:06 |
| 8. | "Proven Lands" | 1:51 |
| 9. | "HW / Hope of New Fields" | 2:30 |
| 10. | "Stranded the Line" | 2:21 |
| 11. | "Prospectors Quartet" | 2:57 |

Bonus Tracks
| No. | Title | Length |
|---|---|---|
| 12. | "HW / Hope of New Fields (Orchestral Version)" | 2:32 |
| 13. | "Prospectors Quartet (Orchestral Version)" | 2:56 |
| 14. | "De-Tuned Quartet" | 4:32 |
| 15. | "Convergence (Jonny Greenwood)" | 4:26 |
