= Threnody to the Victims of Hiroshima =

1961 composition by Krzysztof Penderecki

- by Krzysztof Penderecki
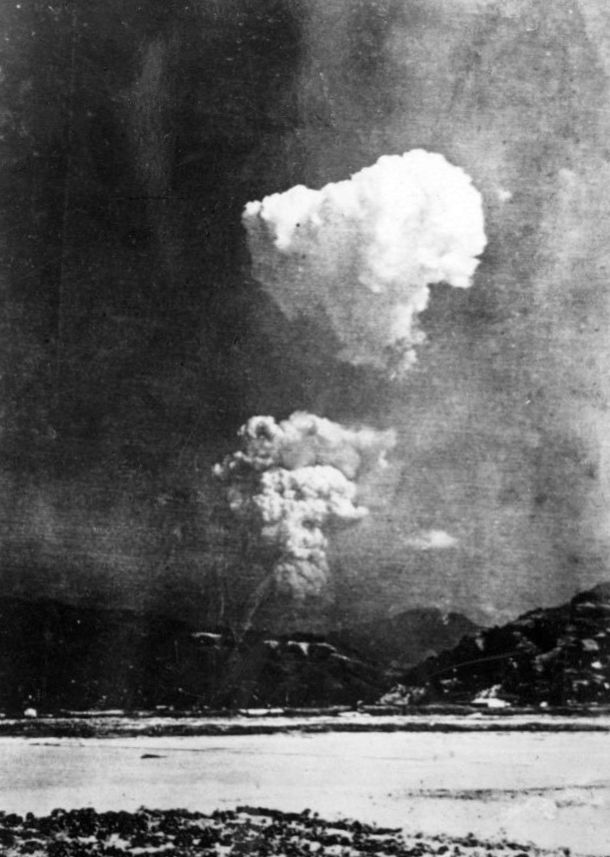
- Atomic cloud over Hiroshima, 1945
- Native name: Tren – ofiarom Hiroszimy
- Full title: Polish: Tren – ofiarom Hiroszimy na 52 instrumenty smyczkowe Threnody to the Victims of Hiroshima for 52 string instruments
- Year: 1961
- Period: Contemporary, postmodernism
- Genre: Threnody
- Style: Sonorism, avant-garde
- Form: Orchestral piece
- Dedication: Victims and Hibakusha of the atomic bombing of Hiroshima
- Publisher: Polskie Wydawnictwo Muzyczne; Polskie Nagrania Warszawa
- Duration: 8:37

Premiere
- Date: 22 September 1961; 64 years ago
- Location: Warsaw Autumn Festival
- Conductor: Andrzej Markowski
- Performers: Krakow Philharmonic; Symphony Orchestra
- ISWC T-905.954.212-0 Awards • 4th Place (Note: The UNESCO prize is not restricted to choosing a single winner, rather, the Rostrum may choose any number of winners who are then listed in their order of selection.); UNESCO Tribune Internationale des Compositeurs (1961) • 3rd Degree; Polish Ministry of Culture and Art Award (1962)

Threnody to the Victims of Hiroshima, also translated as Threnody for the Victims of Hiroshima (Polish: Tren – ofiarom Hiroszimy), is a musical composition for 52 string instruments composed in 1961 by Krzysztof Penderecki. Dedicated to the residents and hibakusha who were killed or wounded in Hiroshima during the first-ever wartime usage of an atomic weapon, Penderecki's threnody won the Tribune Internationale des Compositeurs UNESCO prize in 1961. (Note: While referred to informally as the UNESCO prize, UNESCO is not involved with the selection of winners, who are instead chosen by the Tribune Internationale des Compositeurs (Rostrum of International Composers, or Rostrum). The Rostrum is organized by the International Music Council, an NGO which was created in 1949 as UNESCO's advisory body on matters of music.)

== Description ==
The 52 string instruments indicated in the piece's full title are 24 violins, 10 violas, 10 cellos and 8 double basses. The piece's written length is about 8 minutes and 37 seconds. Originally called 8'37", the piece applies the sonoristic technique which tends to focus on specific characteristics and qualities of timbre, texture, articulation, dynamics, and motion in an attempt to create freer form, and rigors of specific counterpoint to an ensemble of strings treated to unconventional scoring. Penderecki's stated intent with the composition was to "develop a new musical language". Penderecki later said, "It existed only in my imagination, in a somewhat abstract way." When he heard an actual performance, "I was struck by the emotional charge of the work ... I searched for associations and, in the end, I decided to dedicate it to the Hiroshima victims".

The 52 string instruments meld together in sonoristic manipulation and counterpoint in a manner which, according to reviewer Paul Griffiths, makes the listener "uneasy by choosing to refer to an event too terrible for string orchestral screams". Threnody's sustained tone clusters and various extended techniques – including a riot of varying vibrato, slapped instruments, playing on the tailpiece and behind the bridge – are matched by an optical notation full of thick black lines. At times Penderecki takes an aleatoric approach, offering the players a choice of techniques or demanding irregular degrees of vibrato. The piece is also marked by a considerable rigor in its timing indications, notated in seconds, as well as specific note clusters and the use of quarter tones, clustered pitches and sound mass which accumulates in a reservoir of hypertonality.

== Usage in media ==
Excerpts from Threnody to the Victims of Hiroshima have been used in Alfonso Cuarón's 2006 film Children of Men, Wes Craven's 1991 social thriller The People Under the Stairs, the third season of David Lynch and Mark Frost's TV series Twin Peaks, and Gerry Anderson's 1969 film Journey to the Far Side of the Sun. In music, excerpts from Threnody to the Victims of Hiroshima are sampled in one version of Manic Street Preachers' 1991 song "You Love Us" and in SebastiAn's 2011 release Bird Games.

== See also ==
- Bowed string instrument extended technique
