= All That Skate =

South Korean ice show

All That Skate is a figure skating show produced by All That Sports (AT Sports), a sports agency based on Seoul, South Korea, set up by 2010 Winter Olympic champion Yuna Kim and her mother Park Mi-hee.

== 2019 All That Skate ==
The All That Skate 2019 was held at the Olympic Gymnastics Arena in Seoul, South Korea, on June 6–8. The main theme of the ice show was "Move Me", meaning that it will make people "move" with global world champion, rising skaters who will touch the fan's heart.

=== Cast ===
- (South Korea) Kim Ye-lim
- (South Korea) Park So-youn
- (South Korea) Lee Hae-in
- (South Korea) Lim Eun-soo
- (South Korea) Choi Da-bin
- (United States) Nathan Chen
- (Japan) Shoma Uno
- (Spain) Javier Fernández
- (South Korea) Lee June-hyoung
- (China) Sui Wenjing & Han Cong
- (France) Vanessa James & Morgan Ciprès
- (France) Gabriella Papadakis & Guillaume Cizeron
- (South Korea) Yuna Kim

=== Programs ===
==== Act 1 ====
- Opening – Movement
- Kim Ye-lim, Lee Hae-in, Park So-youn, Choi Da-bin – "Morning Passages"
- Lee June-hyoung – "Farinelli Il Castrato"
- Gabriella Papadakis & Guillaume Cizeron – "Oblivion" by Astor Piazzolla
- Nathan Chen – "Nemesis" by Benjamin Clementine
- Lim Eun-soo – "Make Me Feel" by Janelle Monáe
- Vanessa James & Morgan Ciprès – Michael Jackson medley
- Kim Ye-lim – "One Day I'll Fly Away" (from the Moulin Rouge! OST)
- Shoma Uno – "Great Spirit" by Armin van Buuren and Vini Vici
- Wenjing Sui & Cong Han – "Swift Sword" (from the Hero soundtrack) by Tan Dun
- Lee Hae-in – "Never Enough" (from The Greatest Showman OST) by Loren Allred
- Javier Fernández – "Prometo" (Promise) by Pablo Alborán
- Gabriella Papadakis & Guillaume Cizeron/Vanessa James & Morgan Ciprès – "Gypsy Nocturne"
- Yuna Kim – Variations on "Dark Eyes"

==== Act 2 ====
- Nathan Chen, Javier Fernández, Shoma Uno, Lee June-hyoung – "Thunder"
- Park So-youn – "7 Rings" / "Problem" by Ariana Grande
- Vanessa James & Morgan Ciprès – "Someone You Loved" by Lewis Capaldi
- Lim Eun-soo – A Star Is Born
- Choi Da-bin – "Big Spender"
- Shoma Uno – "Time After Time" by Harry Connick Jr.
- Yuna Kim – "Issues"
- Javier Fernández – "Black Betty" by Ram Jam
- Wenjing Sui & Cong Han – "Run" by Leona Lewis
- Nathan Chen – "Next to Me" by Otto Knows
- Gabriella Papadakis & Guillaume Cizeron – "Power Over Me"
- Finale – "Sing Sing Sing"
- Curtain Call
- Guest – Mamamoo (June 6–7)

== 2018 All That Skate ==
The SK Telecom All That Skate 2018 was held at the Mokdong Ice Rink in Seoul, South Korea, on May 20–22. With the passionate support at the 2018 Pyeongchang Winter Olympics and gratitude to the figure skating fans, the theme of the ice show is "This is for you".

=== Cast ===
- (Canada) Kaetlyn Osmond
- (South Korea) Choi Da-bin
- (South Korea) Park So-youn
- (South Korea) Lim Eun-soo
- (South Korea) You Young
- (South Korea) Kim Ye-lim
- (Switzerland) Stéphane Lambiel
- (Canada) Patrick Chan
- (Canada) Jeffrey Buttle
- (South Korea) Lee June-hyoung
- (Canada) Meagan Duhamel & Eric Radford
- (Canada) Tessa Virtue & Scott Moir
- (France) Gabriella Papadakis & Guillaume Cizeron
- (South Korea) Yuna Kim

=== Programs ===
==== Act 1 ====
- Opening – Jupiter, the Bringer of Jollity by Gustav Holst
- Kim Ye-lim – Romeo and Juliet OST
- Park So-youn – "This Is Me" (from The Greatest Showman OST)
- Patrick Chan – "Lovers in a Dangerous Time" by Barenaked Ladies
- Meagan Duhamel & Eric Radford – "Be Mine" by Ofenbach
- Stéphane Lambiel – "Read All About It" by Emeli Sandé
- Choi Da-bin – The Godfather OST
- Tessa Virtue & Scott Moir – "You Rock My World" by Michael Jackson
- Jeffrey Buttle – "For Forever" by Ben Platt
- Kaetlyn Osmond – "Lost" by Anouk
- Gabriella Papadakis & Guillaume Cizeron – "Gravity" by John Mayer
- Yuna Kim – "House of Woodcock" by Jonny Greenwood (from Phantom Thread OST)

==== Act 2 ====
- Opening
  - Guest – (May 20, May 22) Odissea / Ave Maria by Forte di Quattro (2016 winners of Phantom Singer)
  - Guest – (May 21) In Un'Altra Vita / Sweet Dreams by Forestella (2017 winners of Phantom Singer)
- You Young – Chicago OST
- Lee June-hyoung – Rinascero by Erwin Schrott
- Lim Eun-soo – "Havana" by Camila Cabello (ft. Young Thug)
- Jeffrey Buttle – "Gotta Get Thru This" by Daniel Bedingfield
- Meagan Duhamel & Eric Radford – "Sign of the Times" by Harry Styles
- Patrick Chan – "Hallelujah" by Jeff Buckley
- Kaetlyn Osmond – "Too Darn Hot" by Ella Fitzgerald
- Gabriella Papadakis & Guillaume Cizeron – "Shape of You" / "Thinking Out Loud" by Ed Sheeran
- Choi Da-bin – "Sparkling Diamonds" (from Moulin Rouge! OST)
- Stéphane Lambiel – "Slave to the Music" by James Morrison
- Tessa Virtue & Scott Moir – Moulin Rouge! OST
- Finale – "God Only Knows" by Joss Stone
- Curtain Call – "2U" by David Guetta (ft. Justin Bieber)

== 2016 All That Skate ==
The All That Skate 2016 was held at the Mokdong Ice Rink in Seoul, South Korea, on June 4–6. The theme of the ice show was "The Dream".

=== Cast ===
- (United States) Ashley Wagner
- (Russia) Elena Radionova
- (South Korea) Park So-youn
- (South Korea) You Young
- (South Korea) Lim Eun-soo
- (South Korea) An So-hyun
- (Kazakhstan) Denis Ten
- (Uzbekistan) Misha Ge
- (South Korea) Kim Jin-seo
- (South Korea) Lee June-hyoung
- (Germany) Aliona Savchenko & Bruno Massot
- (Italy) Anna Cappellini & Luca Lanotte
- (South Korea) Rebeka Kim & Kirill Minov

=== Programs ===
==== Act 1 ====
- Opening – Overture by Michael Kamen
- An So-hyun – "Stone Cold" by Demi Lovato
- Rebeka Kim & Kirill Minov – "Uptown Funk" by Mark Ronson
- Denis Ten – "Lose Yourself (Remix)" by Eminem
- Elena Radionova – "Worth It" by Fifth Harmony
- Aliona Savchenko & Bruno Massot – Mozart Serenade in G Major Medley by Various Artists
- Lee June-hyoung – "Blind Love" by Ensemble Sinawi
- Ashley Wagner – "Dangerous Woman" by Ariana Grande
- Misha Ge – "I'm Young" by Winner
- Anna Cappellini & Luca Lanotte – "Fireflies" by Leona Lewis
- Park So-youn – "Amazing Grace" by Hayley Westenra

==== Act 2 ====
- Opening – "Mr. Mystery" / "If Spring Comes" by Ahn Ye-eun (K-pop Star 5 runner-up)
- Kim Jin-seo – "Can't Take My Eyes Off You" by John Lloyd Young & Juicy Wiggle by Redfoo
- Lim Eun-soo – "Let's Have a Kiki" by Glee Cast
- Misha Ge – "Bang Bang Bang" by BigBang
- You Young – "Puttin' On the Ritz" by Robbie Williams
- Anna Cappellini & Luca Lanotte – "La Cumparsita" by Matos Rodriguez
- Elena Radionova – "Imagine" by Emeli Sande
- Women Group – "Cheer Up" by Twice
- Aliona Savchenko & Bruno Massot – "That Man" by Caro Emerald
- Denis Ten – "Made to Love" by John Legend
- Ashley Wagner – "Hip Hip Chin Chin" by Club des Belugas
- Finale – "Kick Ass (We Are Young)" by Mika
- Curtain Call – "Tonight" by Spica

== 2014 All That Skate ==
The Samsung Galaxy★Smart Aircon All That Skate 2014 was held at the Olympic Gymnastics Arena in Seoul, South Korea, on May 4–6. The theme of the ice show was "Adios Gracias", marking the end of Yuna Kim's competitive figure skating career.

=== Cast ===
- (South Korea) Yuna Kim
- (Canada) Shae-Lynn Bourne
- (South Korea) Park So-youn
- (South Korea) Kim Hae-jin
- (Russia) Alexei Yagudin
- (Switzerland) Stéphane Lambiel
- (Kazakhstan) Denis Ten
- (China) Yan Han
- (South Korea) Kim Jin-seo
- (Russia) Tatiana Volosozhar & Maxim Trankov
- (Germany) Aliona Savchenko & Bruno Massot
- (South Korea) Rebeka Kim & Kirill Minov

=== Programs ===
==== Act 1 ====
- Opening – Frozen by Christophe Beck
- Rebeka Kim & Kirill Minov – Scheherazade by Nikolai Rimsky-Korsakov
- Kim Hae-jin – "Ready to Fly" by Amy Pearson
- Yan Han – "The Impossible Dream" by Mitch Leigh and Joe Darion
- Aliona Savchenko & Bruno Massot – "Happy" by Pharrell Williams
- Park So-youn – "I Dreamed a Dream" by Idina Menzel
- Denis Ten – "Mi Mancherai" by Josh Groban
- Shae-Lynn Bourne – "Bom Bom" by Sam and the Womp
- Stéphane Lambiel – "The Water" by Hurts
- Tatiana Volosozhar & Maxim Trankov – "Somebody to Die For" by Hurts
- Alexei Yagudin – "Winter" by Bond
- Yuna Kim – "Send in the Clowns" by Stephen Sondheim

==== Act 2 ====
- Yan Han – "The Blue Danube" by Johann Strauss II
- Park So-youn – The Swan by Camille Saint-Saëns
- Aliona Savchenko & Bruno Massot – "You Don't Bring Me Flowers" by Neil Diamond and Barbra Streisand
- Kim Jin-seo – "Growl" by Exo
- Alexei Yagudin – "Oblivion" by Ástor Piazzolla
- Shae-Lynn Bourne – "Firedance" by Bill Whelan
- Denis Ten – "Sing, Sing, Sing" by Louis Prima
- Tatiana Volosozhar & Maxim Trankov – Piano Concerto No.2 Op.18 in C minor mvt.2 by Sergei Rachmaninoff
- Stéphane Lambiel – Piano Concerto in A minor, Op.16 by Edvard Grieg
- Yuna Kim – "Nessun dorma" by Giacomo Puccini
- Finale – "Time to Say Goodbye" by Kang Hye-jung, soprano and Jung Eui-geun, tenor
- Curtain Call – "Glad You Came" by Glee Cast

== 2013 All That Skate ==
The Samsung Galaxy★Smart Aircon All That Skate 2013 was held at the Olympic Gymnastics Arena in Seoul, South Korea, on June 21–23. The concept of the ice show contains the message of the original Les Misérables – love and forgiveness, the meaning of hope and salvation, consolation to those people who are tired of living, and encouragement to all who are challenging in this era.

=== Cast ===
- (South Korea) Yuna Kim
- (Canada) Joannie Rochette
- (United States) Ashley Wagner
- (South Korea) Kim Hae-jin
- (Canada) Kurt Browning
- (Switzerland) Stéphane Lambiel
- (Spain) Javier Fernández
- (South Korea) Kim Jin-seo
- (Germany) Aliona Savchenko & Robin Szolkowy
- (Russia) Tatiana Volosozhar & Maxim Trankov
- (Ukraine) Vladimir Besedin & Oleksiy Polishchuk
- (United Kingdom) Fiona Zaldua & Dmitry Sukhanov

=== Programs ===
==== Act 1 ====
- Opening – Les Misérables by Claude-Michel Schönberg
  - "Look Down"
  - "I Dreamed a Dream"
- Kim Hae-jin – The Umbrellas of Cherbourg by Michel Legrand
- Fiona Zaldua & Dmitry Sukhanov – Depeche Mode
- Ashley Wagner – "Young and Beautiful" by Lana Del Rey
- Vladimir Besedin & Oleksiy Polishchuk – Sport Games by Various Artists
- Javier Fernández – Charlie Chaplin medley
- Aliona Savchenko & Robin Szolkowy – "Nella Fantasia" by Ennio Morricone
- Joannie Rochette – "Is It a Crime?" by Sade
- Stéphane Lambiel – "One" (from A Chorus Line) by Marvin Hamlisch
- Tatiana Volosozhar & Maxim Trankov – "Nocturne" by Secret Garden
- Kurt Browning – "Singing in the Rain" by Gene Kelly
- Yuna Kim – "Imagine" by Avril Lavigne

==== Act 2 ====
- Vladimir Besedin & Oleksiy Polishchuk – "Master of the House" (from Les Misérables) by Claude-Michel Schönberg
- Kim Jin-seo – The Mask OST by Randy Edelman
- Fiona Zaldua & Dmitry Sukhanov – Snow White and the Huntsman O.S.T. by James Newton Howard
- Joannie Rochette – "That Man" by Caro Emerald
- Kurt Browning – "Who's Got the Pain" by Gwen Verdon & Bob Fosse
- Tatiana Volosozhar & Maxim Trankov – "Skyfall" by Adele
- Ashley Wagner – "Sweet Dreams (Are Made of This)" by Eurythmics
- Javier Fernández – Aerobic Class
- Aliona Savchenko & Robin Szolkowy – "Suit & Tie" by Justin Timberlake (feat. Jay-Z)
- Stéphane Lambiel – "Run by Leona Lewis
- Yuna Kim – Les Misérables by Claude-Michel Schönberg
- Finale – Les Misérables by Claude-Michel Schönberg
  - "Castle on a Cloud"
  - "Final Battle"
  - "Do You Hear the People Sing?"
- Curtain Call – "One Day More" (from Les Misérables) by Claude-Michel Schönberg

== 2012 All That Skate Summer ==
The All That Skate Summer 2012 was held at the Olympic Gymnastics Arena in Seoul, South Korea, on August 24–26.

=== Cast ===
- (South Korea) Yuna Kim
- (Canada) Joannie Rochette
- (Finland) Laura Lepistö
- (Finland) Kiira Korpi
- (Russia) Alexei Yagudin
- (Switzerland) Stephane Lambiel
- (Canada) Patrick Chan
- (France) Brian Joubert
- (Russia) Tatiana Totmianina & Maxim Marinin
- (Germany) Aliona Savchenko & Robin Szolkowy
- (United Kingdom) Fiona Zaldua & Dmitry Sukhanov
- (South Korea) Kim Byung-man & Yang Tae-hwa

=== Programs ===
==== Act 1 ====
- Opening – The Beach Boys mix
- Kiira Korpi – The Girl with the Flaxen Hair by Joshua Bell
- Brian Joubert – "L'assasymphonie" by Florent Mothe
- Aliona Savchenko & Robin Szolkowy – "Pink Panther" from The Pink Panther
- Laura Lepistö – "Rolling in the Deep" by Adele
- Stéphane Lambiel – Violin Concerto in D Major by Pyotr Ilyich Tchaikovsky
- Fiona Zaldua & Dmitry Sukhanov – Angels & Demons
- Joannie Rochette – "For me Formidable" by France d'Amour
- Patrick Chan – "Mannish Boy" by Muddy Waters
- Kim Byung-man & Yang Tae-hwa – "Tarzan Style" by Various Artists
- Alexei Yagudin – Libertango by Astor Piazzolla
- Tatiana Totmianina & Maxim Marinin – "Exchange of Relatives" by Igor Krutoy
- Yuna Kim – "All of Me" by Michael Bublé

==== Act 2 ====
- Lee Hi – "Good Girl" by Carrie Underwood
- Laura Lepistö – "Dancing" by Elisa
- Tatiana Totmianina & Maxim Marinin – "Masks" by Igor Krutoy
- Patrick Chan – "Till Kingdom Come" by Coldplay
- Kiira Korpi – "Wide Awake" by Katy Perry
- Fiona Zaldua & Dmitry Sukhanov – "We Come 1" by Faithless
- Brian Jobuert – Gladiator OST from the film Gladiator
- Joannie Rochette – "Show Me How You Burlesque" by Christina Aguilera
- Alexei Yagudin – "Burn My Shadow" by Unkle
- Aliona Savchenko & Robin Szolkowy – "The Boys" by Girls' Generation
- Stéphane Lambiel – "Puttin' on the Ritz" by Irving Berlin
- Yuna Kim – "El Tango de Roxanne" from the film Moulin Rouge!
- Park Ji-min – "Over the Rainbow" by Harold Arlen and Yip Harburg
- Finale – Happy Feet mix from the film Happy Feet Two
- Curtain Call – "We Found Love" by Rihanna

== 2012 All That Skate Spring ==
The E1 All That Skate Spring 2012 was held at the Olympic Gymnastics Arena in Seoul, South Korea, on May 4–6.

=== Cast ===
- (South Korea) Yuna Kim
- (Italy) Carolina Kostner
- (United States) Alissa Czisny
- (South Korea) Kwak Min-jeong
- (South Korea) Kim Hae-jin
- (United States) Evan Lysacek
- (Canada) Patrick Chan
- (Switzerland) Stephane Lambiel
- (South Korea) Kim Jin-seo
- (China) Shen Xue & Zhao Hongbo
- (Canada) Jamie Salé & David Pelletier
- (Russia) Tatiana Volosozhar & Maxim Trankov
- (Ukraine) Vladimir Besedin & Oleksiy Polishchuk

=== Programs ===
==== Act 1 ====
- Opening – Avatar mix
- Alissa Czisny – "La Vie en rose" by Édith Piaf
- Kim Hae-jin – Moonlight Sonata by Ludwig van Beethoven
- Tatiana Volosozhar & Maxim Trankov – "I Will Always Love You" by Whitney Houston
- Patrick Chan – Elegie in E Flat Minor by Sergei Rachmaninoff
- Carolina Kostner – "Hallelujah" by Rufus Wainwright
- Jinseo Kim – "Fantastic Baby" by BigBang
- Stéphane Lambiel – Rigoletto by Giuseppe Verdi
- Shen Xue & Zhao Hongbo – "Tian Xia Wu Shuang" by Zhang Liang Ying
- Evan Lysacek – "The Climb" by David Hernandez
- Jamie Salé & David Pelletier – "Who Wants to Live Forever" by Queen
- Yuna Kim – "All of Me" by Michael Bublé

==== Act 2 ====
- Opening – Special Mix
- Vladimir Besedin & Oleksiy Polishchuk – "We No Speak Americano" by Yolanda Be Cool
- Minjeong Kwak – "The Truth Is" by Charice
- Alissa Czisny – "I Like the Way" by BodyRockers
- Tatiana Volosozhar & Maxim Trankov – "Bring Me to Life" by Evanescence
- Stéphane Lambiel – "My Body is a Cage" by Arcade Fire
- Carolina Kostner – "It's Oh So Quiet" by Björk
- Jamie Salé & David Pelletier – "Scream" by Michael Jackson
- Patrick Chan – "Mannish Boy" by Muddy Waters
- Shen Xue & Zhao Hongbo – "I'll Be There" by Andrea Bocelli
- Evan Lysacek – "El Tango de Roxanne" by José Feliciano
- Yuna Kim – "Someone Like You" by Adele
- Vladimir Besedin & Oleksiy Polishchuk – Swan Lake by Pyotr Ilyich Tchaikovsky
- Finale – "Just Like Paradise" by David Lee Roth
- Curtain Call – "Without You" by David Guetta, Usher

== 2011 All That Skate Summer ==
The 2011 All That Skate Summer was held at the Olympic Gymnastics Arena in Seoul, South Korea, on August 13–15. In addition to the regular cast, Krystal Jung and Lee Dong-whun, the winner of Kim Yu-na's Kiss & Cry, a figure skating reality show hosted by Yuna Kim, performed on the last day of the 2011 ATS Summer.

=== Cast ===
- (South Korea) Yuna Kim
- (Russia) Irina Slutskaya
- (Canada) Shae-Lynn Bourne
- (Finland) Kiira Korpi
- (Switzerland) Sarah Meier
- (Canada) Kurt Browning
- (Switzerland) Stéphane Lambiel
- (Canada) Patrick Chan
- (France) Florent Amodio
- (China) Shen Xue & Zhao Hongbo
- (Canada) Jamie Salé & David Pelletier
- (Canada) Tessa Virtue & Scott Moir

=== Programs ===
==== Act 1 ====
- Opening – "Fame", "Flashdance... What a Feeling"
- Kiira Korpi – "You and I" by Lady Gaga
- Florent Amodio – "Mess Around" by Ray Charles
- Sarah Meier – "Not Myself Tonight" by Christina Aguilera
- Jamie Salé & David Pelletier – "Wild Horses" by The Rolling Stones
- Kurt Browning – "Steppin' Out of My Mind" by Geoffrey Tayler
- Irina Slutskaya – "Terra Promessa" by Petra Berger
- Patrick Chan – "Take Five" by Paul Desmond
- Tessa Virtue & Scott Moir – "I Want to Hold Your Hand" by T.V. Carpio
- Shae-Lynn Bourne – "Caruso" by Lara Fabian
- Stéphane Lambiel – Prelude in G Minor, Op.23, No.5 by Sergei Rachmaninoff
- Shen Xue & Zhao Hongbo – "I Believe" by Jenkins and Andrea Bocelli
- Yuna Kim – "Fever" by Beyoncé

==== Act 2 ====
- Opening – "Running" by Sarah Brightman
- Jamie Salé & David Pelletier – "Let's Go Crazy" by Prince
- Kiira Korpi – "Cry Me a River" by Ella Fitzgerald
- Patrick Chan – "Moondance" by Michael Bublé
- Shae-Lynn Bourne – "Waka Waka (This Time for Africa)" by Shakira featuring Freshlyground
- Florent Armodio – Pop Medley by Various Artists
- Irina Slutskaya – "It's Raining Men" by Geri Halliwell
- Stéphane Lambiel – "Don't Stop the Music" by Jamie Cullum
- Shen Xue & Zhao Hongbo – "Sweet Dreams (Are Made of This)" by Eurythmics
- Kurt Browning – "Honey" by Park Jin-young
- Tessa Virtue & Scott Moir – Samba Medley by Various Artists
- Yuna Kim – Homage to Korea by Various Artists
- Kiss & Cry Friends
- Finale – "Don't Stop Believing" by Journey

== 2011 All That Skate Spring ==
The 2011 All That Skate Spring was held at the Jamsil Arena in Seoul, South Korea, on May 6–8, 2011.

=== Cast ===
- (South Korea) Yuna Kim
- (South Korea) Kwak Min-jeong
- (South Korea) Kim Hae-jin
- (Switzerland) Stéphane Lambiel
- (France) Brian Joubert
- (United States) Jeremy Abott
- (United States) Alissa Czisny
- (Russia) Ilia Kulik
- (Russia) Ekaterina Gordeeva
- (China) Shen Xue & Zhao Hongbo
- (China) Dan Zhang & Hao Zhang
- (France) Nathalie Péchalat & Fabian Bourzat

=== Programs ===
==== Act 1 ====
- Opening – "Disco Heaven"
- Kim Hae-jin – "The Show" by Lenka
- Jeremy Abbott – "Hometown Glory" by Adele
- Kwak Min-jeong – "Don't Rain on My Parade" by Glee Cast
- Nathalie Péchalat & Fabian Bourzat – Charlie Chaplin medley
- Alissa Czisny – "Dancing with Myself" by Nouvelle Vague"
- Brian Joubert – "Little Love" by AaRON
- Zhang Dan & Zhang Hao – "Spanish Caravan", "Hello, I Love You" by The Doors
- Stéphane Lambiel – "Don't Stop the Music" by Jamie Cullum
- Ilia Kulik – "Who Wants to Live Forever" by David Garrett
- Shen Xue & Zhao Hongbo – "Tian Xia Wu Shuang" by Zhang Liang Ying
- Ekaterina Gordeeva – "I Believe in You and Me" by Whitney Houston
- Yuna Kim – Giselle by Adolphe Adam

==== Act 2 ====
- Opening – "Born This Way" by Lady Gaga
- Jeremy Abbott – "Rhythm of Love" by Plain White T's
- Kwak Min-jeong – "Get Right" by Jennifer Lopez
- Zhang Dan & Zhang Hao – "Here I Am" by 4Men, Mi
- Brian Joubert – "Rise" by Safri Duo
- Alissa Czisny – "Moon River" by Audrey Hepburn & Henry Mancini
- Nathalie Péchalat & Fabian Bourzat – George of the Jungle by Marc Shaiman
- Ilia Kulik – "Love in This Club" by Usher
- Ekaterina Gordeeva – "Cinema Italiano" by Kate Hudson
- Stéphane Lambiel – Bring Me to Life by Katherine Jenkins
- Shen Xue & Zhao Hongbo – Turandot by Giacomo Puccini
- Yuna Kim – "Fever" by Beyonce
- Special Guest – "Love Alone" by Miss A
- Finale – "Bad Girl Good Girl", "Breathe" by Miss A
- Curtain Call – "The Time (Dirty Bit)" by The Black Eyed Peas

== 2010 All That Skate LA ==
The 2010 All That Skate LA was held at the Staples Center in Los Angeles, California, United States on October 2 and 3, 2010.

=== Cast ===
- (South Korea) Yuna Kim
- (United States) Michelle Kwan
- (United States) Ashley Wagner
- (Canada) Patrick Chan
- (Switzerland) Stéphane Lambiel
- (United States) Johnny Weir
- (China) Shen Xue & Zhao Hongbo
- (Germany) Aliona Savchenko & Robin Szolkowy
- (Canada) Tessa Virtue & Scott Moir
- (United States) Tanith Belbin & Ben Agosto

Special guest

- Younha
- B-Boys

=== Programs ===
==== Act 1 ====
- Opening – "Get the Party Started" by Pink
- Skaters' Introduction
- Ashley Wagner – "Ain't No Other Man" by Christina Aguilera
- Aliona Savchenko & Robin Szolkowy – "Barbie Girl" by Aqua
- Johnny Weir – "A Comme Amour" by Heartbroken
- Tanith Belbin & Benjamin Agosto – "If It Kills Me" by Jason Mraz
- Patrick Chan – "Take Five" by Paul Desmond
- Tessa Virtue & Scott Moir- "Schenkst Du Beim Tango Min Dein Herz" by Dajos Béla & Nights and Days by Waldemar Kazanecki
- Shen Xue & Zhao Hongbo – "Who Wants To Live Forever" by Queen
- Yuna Kim – "Méditation" from Thaïs by Jules Massenet.
- Michelle Kwan – "No One" by Alicia Keys
- Stéphane Lambiel – "Let the Good Times Roll" by Ray Charles
- Ladies' Performance – "She's So Lovely" by Scouting For Girls
- Yuna Kim & Michelle Kwan – "Hero" by Mariah Carey

==== Act 2 ====
- B-Boys & Men Skaters
- Tanith Belbin & Benjamin Agosto – "Use Somebody" by Kings of Leon
- Ashley Wagner – "Speechless" by Lady Gaga
- Patrick Chan – "Viva la Vida" by Coldplay
- Aliona Savchenko & Robin Szolkowy – "Nella Fantasia" by Cortes
- Stéphane Lambiel – William Tell Overture by Gioachino Rossini
- Shen Xue & Zhao Hongbo – Turandot by Giacomo Puccini
- Johnny Weir – "Poker Face" by Lady Gaga
- Michelle Kwan – "Winter Song" by Sara Bareilles with Ingrid Michaelson
- Tessa Virtue & Scott Moir – "I Want to Hold Your Hand" by The Beatles, cover by T.V. Carpio
- Yuna Kim – "Bulletproof" by La Roux
- Special guest – "Just Can't Get Enough" by Younha
- Finale – "Dream On" by Aerosmith song by Younha
- Curtain Call – "Tik Tok" by Kesha

== 2010 All That Skate Summer ==
The 2010 All That Skate Summer was held at the KINTEX center in Goyang City, Gyeonggi Province, South Korea, on July 23–25, 2010. Michelle Kwan joined the show, as well as Sasha Cohen, Stéphane Lambiel, and other skaters. This was the first-ever Kim's ice show hosted by AT Sports.

The main theme of the ice show was "Dreams for Tomorrow", telling the stories of the skaters' dreams and challenges. Kim and Kwan's duet program was performed as a closing gala for the first session. The show was directed by David Wilson.

=== Cast ===
- (South Korea) Yuna Kim
- (United States) Michelle Kwan
- (South Korea) Kwak Min-jeong
- (South Korea) Kim Hae-jin
- (Italy) Silvia Fontana
- (United States) Sasha Cohen
- (Switzerland) Stéphane Lambiel
- (France) Brian Joubert
- (United States) Jeremy Abbott
- (United States) John Zimmerman
- (Canada) Jamie Salé & David Pelletier
- (Germany) Aliona Savchenko & Robin Szolkowy
- (United States) Tanith Belbin & Benjamin Agosto

Special guest

- Younha

=== Programs ===
==== Act 1 ====
- Opening
  - All Skaters – "Get the Party Started" by Pink
- John Zimmerman – "I'm Gonna Crawl" by Led Zeppelin
- Kwak Min-jeong – Canon in D Major by Johann Pachelbel
- Jamie Salé & David Pelletier – "Try" by Blue Rodeo
- Silvia Fontana – "Boom Boom Pow" by The Black Eyed Peas
- Jeremy Abbott – "At This Moment" by Michael Bublé
- Tanith Belbin & Benjamin Agosto – "If It Kills Me" by Jason Mraz
- Brian Joubert – "Love is All" by Roger Glover
- Sasha Cohen – "Hallelujah" by Jeff Buckley
- Aliona Savchenko & Robin Szolkowy – "Barbie Girl" by Aqua
- Stéphane Lambiel – "Let the Good Times Roll" by Ray Charles
- Yuna Kim – "Méditation" from Thaïs by Jules Massenet choreography by David Wilson
- Michelle Kwan – "Primitive" by Annie Lennox
- Closing
  - Yuna Kim & Michelle Kwan – "Hero" by Mariah Carey

==== Act 2 ====
- Opening – "I Have a Dream" by ABBA
- Kim Hae-jin – "You Raise Me Up" by Celtic Women
- Jeremy Abbott – "Viejos Aires" by Nuevo Tango Ensamble
- Silvia Fontana & John Zimmerman – "Purple Rain" by Prince
- Kwak Min-jeong – "Don't Rain on My Parade" soundtrack by Glee
- Brian Joubert – "Aerodynamic" by Daft Punk
- Tanith Belbin & Benjamin Agosto – "Bleeding Love" by Leona Lewis
- Sasha Cohen – "Mein Herr" from Cabaret by Liza Minnelli
- Stéphane Lambiel – William Tell Overture by Gioachino Rossini
- Jamie Salé & David Pelletier – "Scream" by Michael Jackson
- Michelle Kwan – "No One" by Alicia Keys
- Aliona Savchenko & Robin Szolkowy – "Gee" by Girls' Generation
- Yuna Kim – "Bulletproof" by La Roux choreography by David Wilson
- Special guest – "Comet" by Younha
- Finale – "Dream On" by Aerosmith song by Younha
- Curtain Call – "Tik Tok" by Kesha
