= Kim Hae-jin =

South Korean figure skater

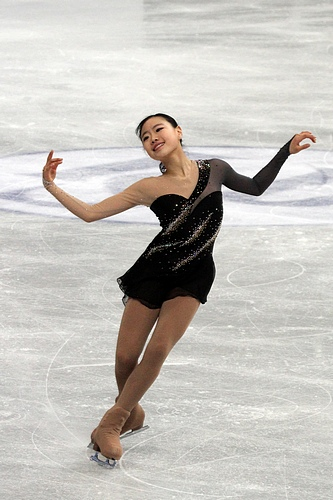
- Kim in 2012

Personal information
- Native name: 김해진 金海珍
- Full name: Kim Hae-jin
- Born: April 23, 1997 (age 29) Anyang, Gyeonggi Province, South Korea
- Height: 1.62 m (5 ft 4 in)

Figure skating career
- Country: South Korea
- Coach: Shin Hea-sook
- Began skating: 2003
- Retired: January 7, 2018

Kim Hae-jin (Korean: 김해진; Hanja: 金海珍; born April 23, 1997) is a South Korean former figure skater. She is a three-time (2010, 2011, and 2012) South Korean national champion. She was selected to represent her country at the 2014 Winter Olympics in Sochi.

On the junior level, she is the 2012 JGP Slovenia champion.

== Career ==
=== Early career ===
In the 2007–08 season, Kim placed 5th at the South Korean Championships on the novice level. A year later in 2009, she repeated that placement on the junior level.

=== 2010–11 season: Junior Grand Prix debut ===
Kim was assigned to 2010–11 ISU Junior Grand Prix events in Japan and Germany. However, her foot was injured by another skater's skate blade in training.

=== 2011–12 season ===
She competed at the 2012 World Junior Championships and earned 51.56 in the short program and 98.15 in the free skate, finishing 8th overall with a total score of 149.71.

== Skating techniques ==
She landed five types of triple jumps (every one except the triple Axel) in the national competition. She landed a triple toe loop-triple toe loop combination in a national competition and a triple flip-triple loop combination in an international event.

== Public life and endorsements ==
She joined 2010 Olympic ladies champion and fellow South Korean skater Yuna Kim in an ice show, All That Skate, which was held on July 23–25, 2010 in Goyang, South Korea, alongside other skaters like Michelle Kwan, Sasha Cohen, and Stéphane Lambiel.

== Programs ==
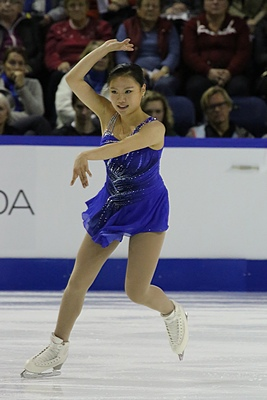
Kim at the 2014 Skate Canada.

Season	Short program	Free skating	Exhibition
2017–2018	Jalousie 'Tango Tzigane' by Jacob Gade	Samson and Delilah by Camille Saint-Saëns	
2016–2017	Papa, Can You Hear Me? (from Yentl) by Michel Legrand	Malagueña by Ernesto Lecuona	
2015–2016	Papa, Can You Hear Me? (from Yentl) by Michel Legrand	Turandot by Giacomo Puccini	
2014–2015	Porgy and Bess by George Gershwin choreo. by Stéphane Lambiel	Rhapsody in Blue by George Gershwin choreo. by David Wilson	Ready to Fly by Amy Pearson choreo. by Yea Ji Shin
2013–2014	The Umbrellas of Cherbourg by Michel Legrand choreo. by David Wilson	Black Swan by Clint Mansell original music by Pyotr I. Tchaikovsky choreo. by David Wilson	Ready to Fly by Amy Pearson choreo. by Yea Ji Shin; The Umbrellas of Cherbourg by Michel Legrand choreo. by David Wilson
2012–2013	La bohème by Sergei Trofanov	Sleeping Beauty by Pyotr I. Tchaikovsky	
2011–2012	Moonlight Sonata by Ludwig van Beethoven	Violin Concerto in E minor by Felix Mendelssohn	The Show by Lenka
2010–2011	Chaplin medley by Charlie Chaplin	Violin Concerto in E minor by Felix Mendelssohn	You Raise Me Up by Celtic Woman
2009–2010	Chaplin medley by Charlie Chaplin	Piano Concerto No. 3 by Sergei Prokofiev	You Raise Me Up by Celtic Woman
2008–2009	Pictures at an Exhibition by Modest Mussorgsky orchestrated by Maurice Ravel	Piano Concerto No. 3 by Sergei Prokofiev	Ain't That a Kick in the Head by Westlife
2007–2008	Pictures at an Exhibition by Modest Mussorgsky orchestrated by Maurice Ravel	Moongate by Secret Garden	

== Competitive highlights ==
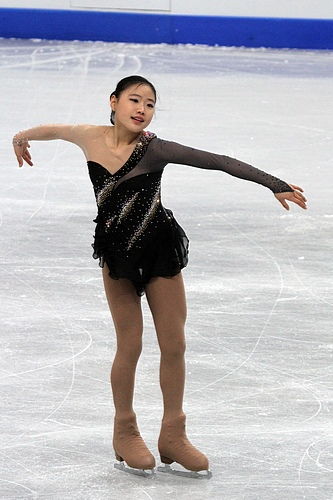
Kim at the 2012 World Junior Figure Skating Championships.

GP: Grand Prix; CS: Challenger Series; JGP: Junior Grand Prix

International
Event	07–08	08–09	09–10	10–11	11–12	12–13	13–14	14–15	15–16	16–17	17–18
Olympics							16th				
Worlds							23rd	19th			
Four Continents						WD	6th	11th			
GP Cup of China								8th			
GP Skate Canada								9th			
CS Nepela Trophy								9th			
Asian Trophy								5th			
Ice Star										5th	
Universiade										WD	
International: Junior or novice
Junior Worlds					8th	19th					
JGP Australia					5th						
JGP Austria						5th					
JGP Czech Rep.							8th				
JGP Germany				28th							
JGP Romania					3rd						
JGP Slovakia							10th				
JGP Slovenia						1st					
Asian Trophy		6th N.			1st J.						
NZ Games					1st J.						
Triglav Trophy			1st N.								
National
South Korean	5th N.	5th J.	1st	1st	1st	4th	3rd	5th	17th	13th	18th
TBD: Assigned, WD: Withdrew; Levels: N. = Novice; J. = Junior

== Detailed results ==
**2017–18 season**
Date	Event	SP	FS	Total
January 5–7, 2018	2018 South Korean Championships	21; 46.54	16; 91.82	18; 138.36
**2016–17 season**
Date	Event	SP	FS	Total
January 6–8, 2017	2017 South Korean Championships	11; 52.49	15; 94.34	13; 146.83
November 18–20, 2016	2016 Ice Star	4; 52.03	5; 87.92	5; 139.95
**2015–16 season**
Date	Event	SP	FS	Total
January 8–10, 2016	2016 South Korean Championships	9; 53.39	19; 89.92	17; 143.31
**2014–15 season**
Date	Event	SP	FS	Total
March 23–29, 2015	2015 ISU World Championships	18; 50.03	19; 86.21	19; 136.24
February 9–15, 2015	2015 ISU Four Continents Championships	11; 51.41	12; 95.89	11; 147.30
January 5–9, 2015	2015 South Korean Championships	12; 50.21	5; 102.65	5; 152.86
November 7–9, 2014	2014 ISU Grand Prix Cup of China	9; 44.72	7; 92.90	8; 137.62
Oct. 31 – Nov. 2, 2014	2014 ISU Grand Prix Skate Canada	10; 52.18	10; 91.25	9; 143.43
October 1–5, 2014	2014 Ondrej Nepela Trophy	7; 46.09	7; 82.79	9; 128.88
August 6–10, 2014	2014 Asian Figure Skating Trophy	4; 50.09	5; 83.64	5; 133.73

**2013–14 season**
Date	Event	Level	QR	SP	FS	Total
March 24–30, 2014	2014 ISU World Championships	Senior	–	19; 51.83	23; 77.99	23; 129.82
February 6–22, 2014	2014 Winter Olympics	Senior	–	18; 54.37	17; 95.11	16; 149.48
January 20–26, 2014	2014 ISU Four Continents Championships	Senior	–	5; **57.48**	7; **109.36**	6; **166.84**
January 1–5, 2014	2014 South Korean Championships	Senior	–	2; 58.48	4; 101.27	3; 159.75
October 2–6, 2013	2013 ISU Junior Grand Prix, Czech Republic	Junior	–	10; 47.90	7; 93.55	8; 141.45
September 12–15, 2013	2013 ISU Junior Grand Prix, Slovakia	Junior	–	4; 51.81	17; 70.63	10; 122.44
**2012–13 season**
Date	Event	Level	QR	SP	FS	Total
Feb. 25 – March 3, 2013	2013 ISU World Junior Championships	Junior	–	11; 49.26	21; 65.96	19; 115.22
January 2–6, 2013	2013 South Korean Championships	Senior	–	5; 49.41	4; 93.98	4; 143.39
September 26–29, 2012	2012 ISU Junior Grand Prix, Slovenia	Junior	–	1; 53.64	4; 93.66	1; 147.30
September 12–15, 2012	2012 ISU Junior Grand Prix, Austria	Junior	–	3; 54.46	9; 86.83	5; 141.29
**2011–12 season**
Date	Event	Level	QR	SP	FS	Total
Feb. 27 – March 4, 2012	2012 ISU World Junior Championships	Junior	3; 93.97	7; 51.56	8; 98.15	8; 149.71
January 4–8, 2012	2012 South Korean Championships	Senior	–	1; 55.83	1; 111.90	1; 167.73
September 21–24, 2011	2011 ISU Junior Grand Prix, Romania	Junior	–	6; 44.78	3; 99.83	3; 144.61
September 7–11, 2011	2011 ISU Junior Grand Prix, Australia	Junior	–	1; 52.26	6; 78.76	5; 131.02
August 23–26, 2011	2011 Asian Figure Skating Trophy	Junior	–	1; 49.53	1; 90.08	1; 139.61
August 11–13, 2011	2011 New Zealand Winter Games	Junior	–	1; 49.66	1; 97.17	1; 146.83
**2010–11 season**
Date	Event	Level	QR	SP	FS	Total
January 12–16, 2011	2011 South Korean Championships	Senior	–	3; 46.82	1; 98.47	1; 145.29
October 6–10, 2010	2010 ISU Junior Grand Prix, Germany	Junior	–	26; 28.75	27; 51.86	28; 80.61
**2009–10 season**
Date	Event	Level	QR	SP	FS	Total
April 1–4, 2010	2010 Triglav Trophy	Novice	–	1; 49.68	1; 94.43	1; 144.11
January 7–10, 2010	2010 South Korean Championships	Senior	–	1; 54.23	1; 94.55	1; 148.78
**2008–09 season**
Date	Event	Level	QR	SP	FS	Total
January 7–10, 2009	2009 South Korean Championships	Junior	–	7; 32.65	5; 62.35	5; 95.00
December 21–23, 2008	2008 Asian Figure Skating Trophy	Novice	–	6; 27.54	4; 56.11	6; 83.65
**2007–08 season**
Date	Event	Level	QR	SP	FS	Total
January 8–11, 2008	2008 South Korean Championships	Novice	–	6; 28.34	5; 51.60	5; 79.94

- QR = Qualifying round
- Personal bests highlighted in **bold**.
