= Who I Am (Amy Pearson album) =

Studio album by Amy Pearson
- Released: 19 April 2008
- Recorded: 2005–2007
- Genre: Pop rock
- Length: 51:00
- Label: Sony BMG
- Producer: Anthony Egizii; David Musumeci; Fraser T Smith; Tom Nichols; Tim Baxter; Matthew Gerrard; Steve Chrisanthou

Singles from Who I Am
- 1. "Don't Miss You" Released: 2 June 2007; 2. "Not Me" Released: 20 October 2007; 3. "Ready to Fly" Released: 5 April 2008

Who I Am is the first album by singer Amy Pearson released by Sony BMG in Australia on 19 April 2008 (see 2008 in music). Although the album was planned for release in November 2007, it had been pushed back due to the releases of Delta Goodrem's and Kylie Minogue's albums during the same time. However the album was released in China around the original release date. It has so far released 3 singles in Australia without the help of the album release, "Don't Miss You", "Not Me" and "Ready to Fly". All three have received moderate airtime on Australian mainstream radio stations.

== Promotion ==
In 2007 to promote Don't Miss You, Pearson performed on Channel 7's hit breakfast show Sunrise. She also performed Ready To Fly at It Takes Two finale earlier this year. She has also attended interviews in children shows such as channel 10's Toasted TV, later performing a shortened acoustic version of Ready To Fly with host Dan Sweetman, and channel 7's Saturday Disney. With the release of her album she performed at Westfield Parramatta singing songs and signing copies of Who I Am The song Now and For Always featured in the Korean reality show We Got Married on 6 July 2008.

== Singles ==
- "Don't Miss You": On 22 June 2007, the song was released on CD single, and was quickly acclaimed by the public. It peaked at #19 on the ARIA Singles Chart after several weeks, and was the 89th best selling single of 2007.
- "Not Me": Released as the second single in November 2007, the song was snapped up by radio stations quickly and played usually, as the "Screw You" remix. It peaked at #37 on The ARIA Singles Chart.
- "Ready To Fly": Released as the third single on 8 April' to coincide with the Beijing Olympics, as the official song. It peaked at #40 on the ARIA Singles Chart. It was popular on the radio, and was remixed with Guitars, to give it a more edgy sound.

== Chart performance ==
Who I Am debuted on the ARIA Albums Chart at #39 on its first week of charting, and although it only stayed on the top 50 for one week, it remained on the top one hundred for four weeks. It also managed a peak of eleven on the Australasian Albums Chart and number thirty-eight on the Physical Albums Chart.

== Track listing ==
No.	Title	Writer(s)	Producer(s)	Length
1.	"Don't Miss You"	Amy Pearson, Anthony Egizii, David Musumeci	Anthony Egizii, David Musumeci	3:21
2.	"Fool"	Amy Pearson, Eg White, Karen Poole	Anthony Egizii, David Musumeci	3:03
3.	"Not Me"	Amy Pearson, Gil Cang	Fraser T Smith	3:13
4.	"Does Anybody?"	Amy Pearson, Danielle Brisebois, Wayne Rodriguez	Anthony Egizii, David Musumeci	3:54
5.	"Ready to Fly"	Amy Pearson, Tom Nichols, Tim Baxter	Tom Nichols, Tim Baxter	4:30
6.	"Stranded"	Amy Pearson, Klaus Derendorf, Tom Nichols	Klaus Derendorf, Tom Nichols	3:41
7.	"Don't Ya Give Up"	Amy Pearson, Steve Chrisanthou	Steve Chrisanthou	4:02
8.	"Now and for Always"	Amy Pearson, Matthew Gerrard	Matthew Gerrard	3:27
9.	"Love Is Out of Reach"	Amy Pearson, Negin Djafari, Jonas Jeberg	Tom Nichols, Tim Baxter	4:14
10.	"Wish I Was Her"	Amy Pearson, Nina Woodford, Karsten Dahlgaard, Peter Biker	Anthony Egizii, David Musumeci	4:04
11.	"Tell Me"	Amy Pearson	Tom Nichols, Tim Baxter	4:10
12.	"Remember to Breathe"	Amy Pearson, Tom Nichols, Tim Baxter	Tom Nichols, Tim Baxter	4:59

Bonus tracks
No.	Title	Writer(s)	Producer(s)	Length
13.	"Lost Without Your Love" (radio mix; from the movie Closing the Ring)	Chris C. Porter	Chris C. Porter, Paul Honey	4:26
14.	"Fading Picture" (iTunes bonus track)	Amy Pearson, Anthony Egizii, David Musumeci	Anthony Egizii, David Musumeci	3:54

Japanese Ready to Fly bonus tracks
No.	Title	Writer(s)	Length
14.	"Love Like This"	Ry Cuming	3:18
15.	"We Both Know"	Tim N. Baxter, Thomas Nichols, Guy Sebastian, Michael Kentish, Toby Stebastian	4:20

== Charts ==
Chart performance for Who I Am
Chart (2008)	Peak position
Australian Albums (ARIA)	39

== Release history ==
Country	Date
China	12 November 2007
Australia	19 April 2008
Japan (Released as Ready to Fly)	24 September 2008
