= Not Me (song) =

Single by Amy Pearson

from the album Who I Am
- Released: 20 October 2007
- Genre: Pop
- Label: Sony-BMG
- Songwriter(s): Amy Pearson, Gil Cang
- Producer(s): Fraser T Smith

Amy Pearson singles chronology
"Don't Miss You" (2007)	"Not Me" (2007)	"Ready to Fly" (2008)

"Not Me" is Amy Pearson's second single from her debut album Who I Am. It charted at number 37 in the ARIA Singles Chart.

== Song meaning ==
The song was written by Pearson and is said to be about a pushy partner who wanted to know everything there is to know about her.

== Track listing ==
1. "Not Me"
2. "Not Me" (Screw You Mix)
3. "Don't Miss You" (Pop Embassy Remix)
4. "Not Me" (A Cappella)

== Charts ==
"Not Me" debuted in the ARIA top 50 singles chart at 37 on 28 November 2007 then falling to position 47 for two weeks before exiting. Then two weeks later on 2 December 2007 re-entering at 47.

Chart	Peak
ARIA Singles Chart	37
ARIA Physical Singles Chart	31
ARIA Australian Chart	9
