= Phantom Thread (soundtrack) =

Phantom Thread (Original Motion Picture Soundtrack)

Film score by Jonny Greenwood
- Released: 12 January 2018 (digital); 9 February 2018 (CD); 21 April 2018 (vinyl)
- Studio: RAK Studios (London, England); AIR Studios (London, England)
- Genre: Orchestral; contemporary classical; film score
- Length: 55:53
- Label: Nonesuch
- Producer: Graeme Stewart

Jonny Greenwood chronology
Junun (2015)	Phantom Thread (Original Motion Picture Soundtrack) (2018)	You Were Never Really Here (2018)

Phantom Thread (Original Motion Picture Soundtrack) is the original soundtrack album to the 2017 film Phantom Thread, directed by Paul Thomas Anderson and starring Daniel Day-Lewis. The record consists of eighteen tracks from a film score written and composed by Jonny Greenwood. Greenwood's score was released digitally by Nonesuch Records on 12 January 2018, with a CD edition later released on 9 February 2018 and a vinyl edition on 21 April 2018. In preparation for the score, Greenwood researched the musical trends of the 1950s, referencing Glenn Gould's Bach recordings and the work of Nelson Riddle. The score was recorded in London with a 60-piece orchestra, including the Royal Philharmonic Orchestra and the London Contemporary Orchestra. It is Greenwood's fourth soundtrack for director Paul Thomas Anderson and appears across the majority of the film's 130-minute runtime. It was met with favourable reviews from critics, receiving nominations for the Academy Award for Best Original Score, the Golden Globe Award for Best Original Score and the BAFTA Award for Best Original Music.

== Background and recording ==
Phantom Thread is a historical drama set in 1950s London about a fictional couturier, Reynolds Woodcock, played by Daniel Day-Lewis. The soundtrack was composed by Jonny Greenwood and consists of piano and string sections. Director Paul Thomas Anderson initially asked Greenwood for an "English" sound, but they found the folk-influenced orchestral music typical of Britain in the 1950s too "twee" for a London fashion designer like Woodcock. Greenwood specifically researched music written and recorded during the 1950s as well as the classical music popular with that generation. The works of Nelson Riddle and Glenn Gould's Bach recordings were Greenwood's primary references. In particular, Anderson advised Greenwood to research Riddle's score for Stanley Kubrick's Lolita (1962) and his work with jazz pianist Oscar Peterson. Anderson also advised Greenwood to view David Lean's 1949 film The Passionate Friends, which was scored by Richard Addinsell. The music of jazz pianist Bill Evans was also an inspiration for Greenwood.

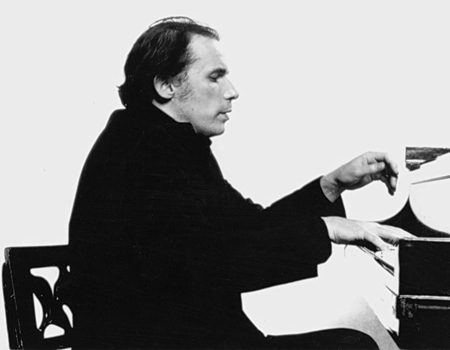
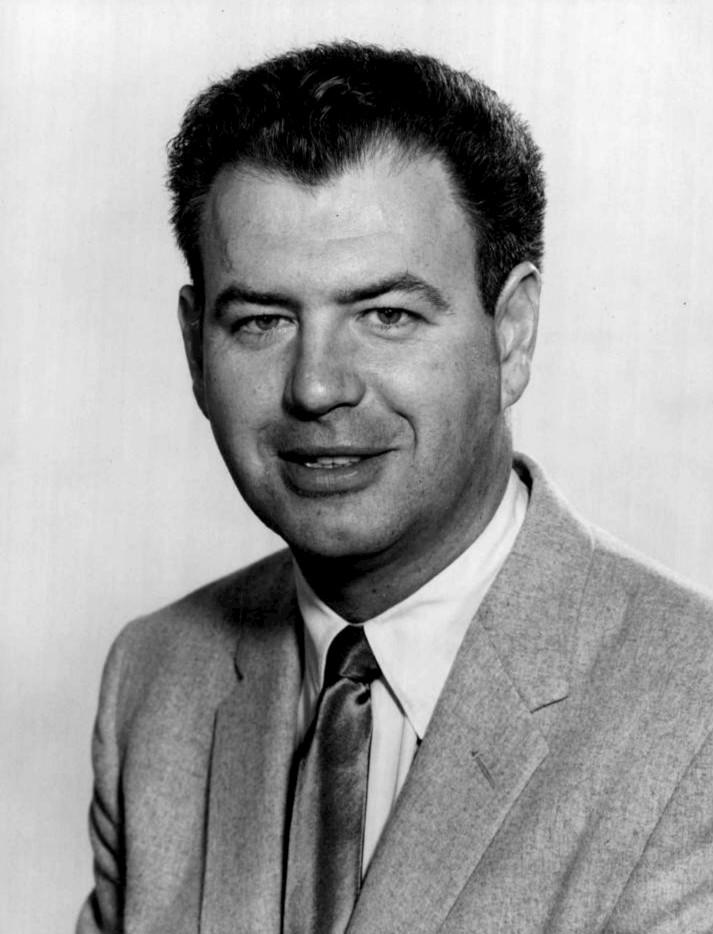
Glenn Gould (left) and Nelson Riddle (right) were Greenwood's main references for the film's score.

Greenwood's score was written during his travels for Radiohead's A Moon Shaped Pool tour, including in hotel rooms and dressing rooms. His process involved recording demos on his iPhone and sending them to Anderson. The first two pieces he sent were deemed too dark by Anderson, who felt the music was "giving away what's going to happen" in the story. Anderson pushed Greenwood for a more romantic sound, and was interested in incorporating large string sections. Greenwood was inspired by the large, "over-the-top" romantic orchestra recordings of Baroque composers Bach and Vivaldi from the 1960s and 1970s, including Riccardo Muti's 1977 recording of Vivaldi's "Gloria". He was also inspired by string-heavy jazz records from the 1950s, including Ben Webster's Music for Loving (1954). Greenwood envisioned what music the characters would have listened to, and convinced Anderson that Woodcock would intensely listen to Glenn Gould. Principally, Greenwood focused on composing "genuinely romantic music" that was sincere and not "pastiche" or "overly atonal/microtonal". At the same time, he worked to ensure the music was keeping with the 1950s while avoiding any sense of being "tongue-in-cheek" or "ironic", which Greenwood believed was antithetical to Woodcock's nature. The piano served as the common ground between the contrasting romantic compositions for the film and the more formal befitting Woodcock. Greenwood also received musical input from Day-Lewis, who discussed the music of Thomas Tallis.

The album was recorded in London at RAK Studios and AIR Studios. The sessions included the Royal Philharmonic Orchestra, conducted by Robert Ziegler, and the London Contemporary Orchestra, conducted by Robert Ames. Greenwood also enlisted a string quartet, which appears on four of the album's tracks. At one point, Greenwood recorded with an orchestra of 60 strings, his largest to date. The score also features a cimbalom, which is used to characterise Alma, and is supposed to allude to her presumably Eastern European origins. The album was mixed and mastered at Abbey Road Studios. The soundtrack features prominently in the film, with nearly 90 minutes of music during the film's 130-minute runtime. The film also features music Anderson selected by Claude Debussy, Franz Schubert, Johannes Brahms, Gabriel Fauré, and Hector Berlioz.

== Release and promotion ==
On 1 February 2017, Focus Features officially announced that Greenwood was scoring Anderson's upcoming film. On 26 October 2017, Greenwood shared the sheet music for the film's title theme. The album details were announced on 21 December 2017, and "House of Woodcock" was released the same day. The album was released digitally on 12 January 2018, followed by a CD release on 9 February 2018 and a vinyl LP release on 21 April 2018 (Record Store Day).

The DVD and Blu-ray releases of Phantom Thread included early demos of Greenwood's score.

The score was first performed on 31 January 2018 by the London Contemporary Orchestra during the film's preview screening at the Royal Festival Hall in London. Anderson and Greenwood were in attendance and were interviewed by film critic Mark Kermode. On 24 and 25 February 2018, the score was performed by the Wordless Music Orchestra and the London Contemporary Orchestra at the Brooklyn Academy of Music's Howard Gilman Opera House in Brooklyn, New York. On 2 March 2018, the score was again performed by the Wordless Music Orchestra and the London Contemporary Orchestra at The Theatre at Ace Hotel in Los Angeles, California, with Greenwood and Anderson in attendance.

== Critical reception ==
Professional ratings
Aggregate scores
Source	Rating
AnyDecentMusic?	7.9/10
Metacritic	86/100
Review scores
Source	Rating
AllMusic	4/5 stars
Consequence of Sound	B
Drowned in Sound	8/10
The Independent	3/5 stars
Mojo	5/5 stars
Pitchfork	7.5/10
Q	4/5 stars
Uncut	8/10
Under the Radar	8.5/10

Phantom Thread has a score of 86 out of 100 on Metacritic, indicating "universal acclaim," based on 9 reviews. Andrew Male of Mojo gave the soundtrack a perfect score, calling it "an album that goes far beyond emulation or pastiche to capture the emotional heart of a strange and elusive film". Stephen Thomas Erlewine of AllMusic called Greenwood's score "rich and gorgeous, elegant because of its exacting nature, an aesthetic that suits the film to a T". Michael Bonner of Uncut gave the score an 8 out of 10 rating, writing that it complemented the film's 1950s London setting "with its own opulent old-world beauty". Charles Steinberg of Under the Radar praised the score's ability to "accompany the precise tone of every scene", "rising and falling with all of its subtleties and secrets" and concluded in saying that Greenwood "now feels essential" as a composer. Winston Cook-Wilson of Spin wrote, "Greenwood's abilities have never served one of Anderson's films better, or proved so integral to its power." Richard Driver of PopMatters praised the album's sequencing and called it Greenwood's "strongest developed yet, delivering massive impact for the film". James Oldham of Q called it "uniformly deft, sumptuous and moving".

Kevin Lozano of Pitchfork praised Greenwood's ambition and the score's "subtler" moments like "Never Cursed", but lamented that the score's "sumptuousness can be overbearing" and lacking in its sense of restraint. Zack Ruskin of Consequence of Sound praised Greenwood's orchestration for embodying the demeanour of Reynolds Woodcock, but criticised the score's tendency to "spill over and drown the sparse passages of unease that serve as Phantom Thread's emotional center".

=== Lists ===
Publication	List	Rank	Ref.
Collider	The 15 Best Film Scores of the Decade	5	
Consequence of Sound	Top 25 Film Scores of the 2010s	9	
IndieWire	The 20 Best Movie Scores of the Decade	1	
IndieWire	The 25 Best Movie Scores of the 21st Century	11	
Mojo	The 10 Best Soundtracks of 2018	1	
Pitchfork	The 50 Best Movie Scores of All Time	21	
TheWrap	10 Best Film Scores of the 2010s	4	

=== Accolades ===
Award	Date of ceremony	Category	Result	Ref.
Academy Awards	4 March 2018	Best Original Score	Nominated	
Austin Film Critics Association	8 January 2018	Best Original Score	Nominated	
Boston Society of Film Critics	10 December 2017	Best Original Score	Won	
British Academy Film Awards	18 February 2018	Best Film Music	Nominated	
Chicago Film Critics Association	12 December 2017	Best Original Score	Won	
Critics' Choice Movie Awards	11 January 2018	Best Score	Nominated	
Florida Film Critics Circle	23 December 2017	Best Score	Nominated	
Georgia Film Critics Association	12 January 2018	Best Original Score	Nominated	
Golden Globe Awards	7 January 2018	Best Original Score	Nominated	
Los Angeles Film Critics Association	3 December 2017	Best Music	Won	
San Francisco Film Critics Circle Awards	10 December 2017	Best Original Score	Won	
Seattle Film Critics Society	18 December 2017	Best Original Score	Won	
St. Louis Film Critics Association	17 December 2017	Best Original Score	Won	

== Track listing ==
All tracks are written by Jonny Greenwood.

No.	Title	Length
1.	"Phantom Thread I"	3:36
2.	"The Hem"	2:43
3.	"Sandalwood I"	2:40
4.	"The Tailor of Fitzrovia"	2:31
5.	"Alma"	4:07
6.	"Boletus Felleus"	3:13
7.	"Phantom Thread II"	3:55
8.	"Catch Hold"	2:15
9.	"Never Cursed"	3:46
10.	"That's As May Be"	1:27
11.	"Phantom Thread III"	2:22
12.	"I'll Follow Tomorrow"	1:22
13.	"House of Woodcock"	3:53
14.	"Sandalwood II"	3:43
15.	"Barbara Rose"	4:40
16.	"Endless Superstition"	3:05
17.	"Phantom Thread IV"	2:59
18.	"For the Hungry Boy"	3:36
Total length:		55:53

== Credits and personnel ==
Credits adapted from the album's liner notes.

=== Musicians ===
- Jonny Greenwood – composition (all tracks), orchestrations (all tracks), piano (tracks 7 & 12)
- Hugh Brunt – additional orchestration (track 6)
- Robert Ziegler – conductor (tracks 1, 8, 11, 14, 16, 18), additional orchestration (track 14)
- Robert Ames – conductor (tracks 4, 6, 9, 10, 13)
- Katherine Tinker – piano (tracks 1–6, 8–11, 13–16, 18), celeste (tracks 2, 3, 5, 15)
- Daniel Pioro – violin (tracks 2, 3, 5, 7, 15, 17), solo violin arrangement (track 17)
- Royal Philharmonic Orchestra – performance (tracks 1, 8, 11, 14, 16, 18)
- London Contemporary Orchestra – performance (tracks 4, 6, 9, 10, 13)
- Jonathan Morton – violin (tracks 2, 3, 5, 15)
- Charlotte Bonneton – viola (tracks 2, 3, 5, 15)
- Oliver Coates – cello (tracks 2, 3, 5, 15)
- Eleanor Turner – harp (tracks 2, 3, 5, 15)

=== Technical ===
- Graeme Stewart – production (all tracks), recording (tracks 2–7, 9, 10, 12, 13, 15, 17), mixing (all tracks)
- John Barrett – mixing (all tracks)
- Nick Wollage – recording (tracks 1, 8, 11, 14, 16, 18)
- Fiona Cruickshank – recording (tracks 1, 8, 11, 14, 16, 18)
- Rob Brinkmann – recording assistant (RAK)
- Ashley Andrew-Jones – recording assistant (AIR)
- Christian Wright – mastering (all tracks)

=== Design ===
- Laura Hynd – photography
- Shin Katan – album artwork
- Dustin Stanton – design

== In popular culture ==
- "House of Woodcock" was chosen by figure skater Yuna Kim and used in her act at All That Skate 2018.
