= Spencer (soundtrack) =

Spencer (Original Motion Picture Soundtrack)

Soundtrack album by Jonny Greenwood
- Released: 12 November 2021
- Genre: Soundtrack
- Length: 45:05
- Label: Mercury KX

Jonny Greenwood soundtrack chronology
You Were Never Really Here (2018)	Spencer (Original Motion Picture Soundtrack) (2021)	The Power of the Dog (2021)

Spencer (Original Motion Picture Soundtrack) is the soundtrack to the 2021 film Spencer directed by Pablo Larraín. It was composed by Jonny Greenwood, and combines free jazz and classical baroque music highlighting the tragedy and emotions of Diana, Princess of Wales. The album was released on 12 November 2021 by Mercury KX label.

== Background ==
Greenwood received an e-mail from Larrain insisting him to score the film, but as he was not familiar with his work, Larrain sent one of his filmographies, the Chilean film The Club (2015) which he liked and agreed to be on board. Instead of deriving George Frideric Handel or other pastiche works in royal biopics, Greenwood wanted to underline the empathy of how chaotic and colourful Diana was, in amongst that baroque tradition. He wrote music in regular royal style with kettle drums, trumpets, harpsichords and pipe organs, and while playing, he substituted the baroque orchestra with free jazz players. He did not want the music to sound like the theme from Antiques Roadshow, but improvise them and let it sound vaguely baroque while leaving enough space for true anarchy and chaos.

There are sequences of music that had to be already in place, such as the Christmas Eve dinner where Diana has a breakdown. Larrain wanted the music to be a few minutes long, which Greenwood had written for it and Larrain edited the scenes, which he described as "lovely" as it meant that "all I had to do was write this piece of music and have players play it in a room without thinking about a time code and all of that stuff. It breathes. They are playing to each other rather than playing to a film."

== Track listing ==
No.	Title	Length
1.	"Arrival"	7:25
2.	"Ancient And Modern"	4:54
3.	"Calling The Whipper In"	2:53
4.	"Spencer"	1:43
5.	"The Pearls"	4:13
6.	"Invention For Harpsichord And Compression"	1:46
7.	"Frozen Three"	1:56
8.	"The Boys"	1:29
9.	"Delusion / Miracle"	4:09
10.	"Partita In Five For Two Organs"	1:57
11.	"Home / Lacrimosa"	4:19
12.	"Crucifix"	3:36
13.	"Press Call"	2:06
14.	"New Currency"	2:33
Total length:		45:05

== Reception ==
Matthew Strauss, in his review for Pitchfork assigned a score of 7.3 out of 10, and wrote "There is beauty throughout Greenwood's Spencer, and it always sounds as if it's about to collapse." Brian Kiwanuka of Post Genre magazine wrote "The bar was set extremely high after the remarkable Phantom Thread, but the excellence of Spencer shows that Greenwood was more than up to the task." Music critic Jonathan Broxton wrote "In the end, as is the case with most Greenwood scores, your tolerance for extended periods of dissonance, weirdness, and surprising unconventionality will determine whether or not you can settle in for the long haul and listen." Nick Levine of NME wrote "All scenes, whether soft-hearted or stress-inducing, benefit from a magnificent score by Radiohead‘s Jonny Greenwood." Mark Kermode of The Guardian called it as "a magnificent score that brilliantly accompanies and amplifies the drama". Vanessa Ague of The Road to Sound wrote "Spencer's soundtrack ultimately finds its footing in subtlety, in the moments where a tiny shift in rhythm, or bow stroke, or dynamic that signifies the rot inside of all the beauty." A. O. Scott of The New York Times wrote "Jonny Greenwood's lacerating score like a stiletto, leaves in tatters."

Sumitra Nair of The Week wrote "The background score by Jonny Greenwood is startling and captivating. Greenwood has made use of classical violins and a spattering of jazz to capture the mood of the story, which has been done brilliantly, for right from the beginning one is acquainted with the princess' agony." Justin Chang of Los Angeles Times wrote "The music shudders with all the raw-nerves lyricism you'd expect from Jonny Greenwood (adding another remarkable score to an oeuvre that includes There Will Be Blood and You Were Never Really Here)." Ian Freer of Empire commented that Greenwood's score is "flitting between orchestral tumult and skittish free-flowing jazz".

== Accolades ==
Award	Date of ceremony	Category	Recipient(s)	Result	Ref(s)
Austin Film Critics Association	11 January 2022	Best Original Score	Jonny Greenwood	Nominated	
Boston Society of Film Critics Awards	12 December 2021	Best Original Score	Jonny Greenwood	Won	
Chicago Film Critics Association Awards	15 December 2021	Best Original Score	Jonny Greenwood	Nominated	
Critics' Choice Movie Awards	13 March 2022	Best Score	Jonny Greenwood	Nominated	
Denver Film Critics Society	17 January 2022	Best Score	Jonny Greenwood	Nominated	
Dorian Awards	17 March 2022	Best Film Music	Jonny Greenwood	Nominated	
Georgia Film Critics Association	14 January 2022	Best Original Score	Jonny Greenwood	Nominated	
Gold Derby Film Awards	16 March 2022	Best Original Score	Jonny Greenwood	Nominated	
Hollywood Critics Association	28 February 2022	Best Original Score	Jonny Greenwood	Nominated	
Houston Film Critics Society Awards	19 January 2022	Best Original Score	Jonny Greenwood	Nominated	
International Cinephile Society	6 February 2022	Best Score	Jonny Greenwood	Nominated	
Los Angeles Film Critics Association Awards	18 December 2021	Best Music	Jonny Greenwood	Runner-up	
Online Film Critics Society Awards	24 January 2022	Best Original Score	Jonny Greenwood	Nominated	
San Francisco Bay Area Film Critics Circle	10 January 2022	Best Original Score	Jonny Greenwood	Nominated	
Satellite Awards	2 April 2022	Best Original Score	Jonny Greenwood	Nominated	
Seattle Film Critics Society	17 January 2022	Best Original Score	Jonny Greenwood	Nominated	
St. Louis Gateway Film Critics Association Awards	19 December 2021	Best Music Score	Jonny Greenwood	Nominated	
Washington D.C. Area Film Critics Association	6 December 2021	Best Score	Jonny Greenwood	Nominated	
