= You Were Never Really Here (soundtrack) =

You Were Never Really Here (Original Motion Picture Soundtrack)

Film score by Jonny Greenwood
- Released: 9 March 2018
- Recorded: 2017–2018
- Genre: Film score
- Length: 41:00
- Label: Lakeshore
- Producer: Graeme Stewart

Jonny Greenwood chronology
Phantom Thread (2018)	You Were Never Really Here (Original Motion Picture Soundtrack) (2018)	Spencer (2021)

You Were Never Really Here (Original Motion Picture Soundtrack) is the soundtrack to the 2018 film You Were Never Really Here, composed by Jonny Greenwood. The score was not composed to the film due to Greenwood's busy schedules on tour, instead, as per Ramsay's suggestions, Greenwood had composed few pieces based on the pieces she sent and derived those cues, which was utilised in the background by the sound engineer Graeme Stewart who produced the film score.

The original score featured orchestral string arrangements manipulated with recorders and synthesizers. It was released on 9 March 2018 through Lakeshore Records and was acclaimed by critics, which itself featured in the best-of lists on film scores of the year.

== Development ==
Ramsay wanted to approach Greenwood, as he previously scored We Need to Talk About Kevin (2011). Greenwood being a fan of the former's films was keen to be involved with her as they shared a professional rapport. Since he was on tour, Ramsay sent him few musical pieces to lure him in the project, despite his busy schedules; Greenwood later sent some of the music that he did not score for the picture to Ramsay, which would be edited and incorporated by sound designer Paul Davies and recording and mixing engineer Graeme Stewart.

Greenwood invited few string players from the London Contemporary Orchestra to play the score in a brutal way. He was guided by Ramsay at several instances to provide a noir score, who added "like with Paul Thomas Anderson, it's like a partnership that serves the film and the story, rather than divisioned labour."

Despite the brutal noir themes, Greenwood composed a tender cue titled "Tree" which was used in the lake scene and again in the credits and few cues had him play strings, guitar and cello that served as a core of the film. The final cue, according to Greenwood, was difficult to compose as "the end of the film needed some sort of resolution, without being triumphant." The orchestration was a challenging process, with Greenwood taking months to prepare the score and recorded with a single session. The session consisted of half players who tuned a quarter tone flat making it out of tune one another. Besides orchestra, Greenwood used recorders and synthesizers.

== Reception ==
=== Critical reception ===
Aaron Vehling of Vehlinggo wrote "Greenwood's You Were Never Really Here cues are a profound exercise in nuance and character." Philip Sherburne of Pitchfork rated the soundtrack 7.8 out of 10 and summarised: "The restraint of his score is a testament to his interpretive abilities, but even as a standalone album, You Were Never Really Here is an engrossing listen." Valentin Maniglia of Score It Magazine called it as "one of the most sensorily powerful film scores of these days."

Stephanie Zacharek of Time wrote "The movie's lean, expressive score, by Radiohead's Jonny Greenwood, is intense by itself: if the smell of burned rubber had a sound, it would be this." Emily Yoshida of Vulture wrote "Johnny Greenwood's mournful and energetic score is among his best." Mark Kermode of The Guardian wrote: "Jonny Greenwood's pulsing, throbbing, clanging score heightens the sensory overload as it meshes with Paul Davies's immersive sound design."

=== Best-of lists ===
- 1st – David Ehrlich; IndieWire
- 1st – Charlie Bridgen; Film School Rejects
- 5th – Clayton Purdom, A.A. Dowd, Alex McLevy; The A.V. Club
- 9th – Bilge Ebiri; Vulture
- 9th – Adam Chitwood; Collider

== Track listing ==
You Were Never Really Here (Original Motion Picture Soundtrack) track listing
No.	Title	Length
1.	"Tree Synthesisers"	4:25
2.	"Sandy's Necklace"	3:47
3.	"Nausea"	1:49
4.	"Hammer and Tape"	1:22
5.	"Brothel" (Bass Clarinet)	3:47
6.	"The Hunt"	3:23
7.	"Dark Streets"	1:52
8.	"Ywnrh"	3:56
9.	"Nina Through Glass"	3:22
10.	"Votto"	4:01
11.	"Dark Streets" (Reprise)	1:53
12.	"Downstairs"	0:50
13.	"Joe's Drive"	1:23
14.	"Tree Strings"	5:10
Total length:		41:00

== Credits ==
Credits adapted from liner notes.

Album credits

- Music composer and arranger – Jonny Greenwood
- Music producer, recording and mixing – Graeme Stewart
- Mastering – Shawn Joseph
- Conductor – Hugh Brunt
- Music supervision – Catherine Grieves, Frédéric Junqua

Performer credits

- Cello – Oliver Coates, Reinoud Ford
- Double bass – Dave Brown
- Electric guitar, keyboards, recorder – Jonny Greenwood
- Strings – London Contemporary Orchestra
- Viola – Ian Anderson, Robert Ames
- Violin – Galya Bisengalieva, Sophie Mather

== Accolades ==
Accolades for You Were Never Really Here (Original Motion Picture Soundtrack)
Award	Date of ceremony	Category	Result	Ref.
Boston Society of Film Critics	16 December 2018	Best Original Score	Nominated	
British Independent Film Awards	2 December 2018	Best Music	Won	
Chicago Film Critics Association	8 December 2018	Best Original Score	Nominated	
Florida Film Critics Circle	21 December 2018	Best Score	Nominated	
International Cinephile Society	4 February 2019	Best Original Score	Nominated	
Seattle Film Critics Society	23 February 2019	Best Original Score	Nominated	
