= Don't Miss You =

2007 single by Amy Pearson

Single by Amy Pearson

from the album Who I Am
- B-side: "Love Like This"
- Released: 2 June 2007
- Length: 3:26
- Label: Sony BMG
- Songwriters: Anthony Egizii, David Musumeci, Amy Pearson
- Producers: Anthony Egizii, David Musumeci

Amy Pearson singles chronology
"Don't Miss You" (2007)	"Not Me" (2007)

"Don't Miss You" is the first single from English singer-songwriter Amy Pearson's debut album, Who I Am (2008). It charted at number 19 on the Australian ARIA Singles Chart.

== Lyrical themes ==
According to Pearson, the song was inspired as a result of a long-distance relationship breakup. To her, the song is about moving on from a lost relationship, letting go of what one does not need and being resilient.

== Track listing ==
Australian CD single

1. "Don't Miss You"
2. "Love Like This"
3. "Don't Miss You" (Ra.D remix)
4. "Don't Miss You" (a cappella)

== Chart performance ==
"Don't Miss You" debuted on the Australian ARIA Singles Chart at number 28 on 10 June 2007. After six weeks inside the top 30, it climbed to its peak of 19 on 22 July 2007.

=== Weekly charts ===
Chart (2007)	Peak position
Australia (ARIA)	19

=== Year-end charts ===
Chart (2007)	Position
Australia (ARIA)	89
Australian Artists (ARIA)	22
