= Ready to Fly (Amy Pearson song) =

Single by Amy Pearson

from the album Who I Am
- Released: 5 April 2008
- Recorded: 2006–2007
- Genre: Pop, Rock
- Length: 4:30 (Album version); 4:17 (Radio Edit)
- Label: Sony-BMG
- Songwriter(s): Amy Pearson, Tim Baxter & Tom Nichols
- Producer(s): Tom Nichols, Tim Baxter

Amy Pearson singles chronology
"Not Me" (2007)	"Ready to Fly" (2008)	"Butterfingers" (2009)

"Ready to Fly" is the third single and the second most successful single to be lifted from Amy Pearson's debut album, Who I Am. The song "Ready To Fly" was used by the Seven Network as the song to the 2008 Beijing Olympics. It was released on 5 April 2008. It started on airplay on Australian radio and is played with a different radio mix, with more guitars and drum beats.

The song features the Indonesian singer Rio Febrian.

== Music video ==
The music video for "Ready to Fly" was shot in Shanghai, China. The video starts off with Pearson sitting down at a table in a room (or restaurant) writing the lyrics to the song on a notepad. Outside of the room there is a couple arguing with Chinese authorities. The music video then moves to Sydney. The man asks for her phone number, wanting to take her out on a date. Pearson then goes outside and starts walking as well. The boyfriend puts the engagement ring on Pearson's finger, she "accepts" & they get married (via Qantas) the next week in a Catholic church in Sydney.

Many different shots of Pearson in different places were used, such as the above-mentioned room, the streets of Shanghai, a place with a bright red background etc.

As it was shot in Shanghai, there were various usage of Chinese culture. When the video started, it showed a group of people practicing Tai Chi, however, focusing more on one man than the group. Outside the room in which Pearson started off the video in, and down the alley she walks down, there were many red lanterns and decorations hung around buildings. Many buildings are also seen as modern Chinese architecture.

== Track listing ==
1. "Ready to Fly" (Radio Edit) - 4:21
2. "Ready to Fly" (Album Version) - 4:32
3. "We Both Know" (Duet with Guy Sebastian)
4. "Ready to Fly" (Drive Remix)

iTunes Exclusive

1. "Ready to Fly" (Sonic Funk Remix)
2. "Ready to Fly" (Electrodex Remix)

iTunes Remix EP

1. Ready to Fly (Drive Remix)
2. Ready to Fly (Andy J Remix)
3. Ready to Fly (Diamond Cut Remix)
4. Ready to Fly (Touched By Remix)
5. Ready to Fly (Radio Remix)

== Alternate commercial uses ==
The song was used extensively in Pinoy Idol during the audition and theatre rounds of the competition.

== Charts ==
Although "Ready to Fly" only peaked at #40, it spent 21 weeks inside the top 100 singles chart in Australia.

Chart (2008)	Peak position
ARIA Singles Chart	40

=== End of Year Charts ===
Year	Chart	Ranking
2008	ARIA End of Year Australian Singles	#37
