= Amy Pearson =

English singer-songwriter (born 1985)

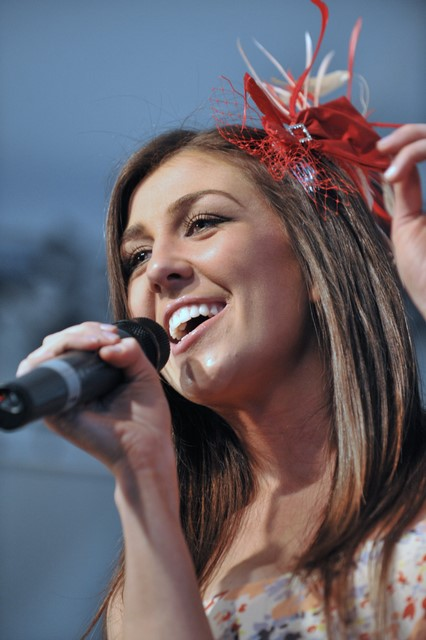
- Pearson in September 2008

Background information
- Born: Amy Pearson; 19 July 1985 (age 41)
- Origin: Birmingham, England
- Genres: Pop
- Occupations: Singer, songwriter
- Years active: 2006–present
- Label: Sony-BMG (2006–2010)
- Website: amypearson.com.au

Amy Elizabeth Pearson (born 19 July 1985) is an English singer and songwriter. Her debut album, Who I Am, was released April 2008.

== Early life ==
Pearson was born on 19 July 1985 in Birmingham, England. Whilst signed to a production company called P.O.E.T Productions run by ex-Take That session musicians/songwriters Neil Oldfield and Neil Evington, Pearson was introduced to and began working closely with SonyBMG Australia's future A&R director and former Australian Idol judge Jay Dee Springbett. As a result, Pearson moved to Australia and signed to SonyBMG in 2004 at 18 years of age. Pearson commenced work on her debut album, which was recorded across 2006 and 2007.

== Music career ==
=== 2006–2010: Sony BMG ===
In 2006, Pearson recorded a song with the first Australian Idol winner, Guy Sebastian titled "We Both Know", which was featured on Home: Songs of Hope & Journey to raise funds and bring attention to Beyond Blue. That same year, a song written by Pearson called "Some Kind of Beautiful" was recorded by Canadian Idol fourth-season winner Eva Avila and was a track on Avila's debut album Somewhere Else. Pearson also recorded a cover of "Joy to the World" for the compilation The Spirit of Christmas 2007.

In late 2006, Pearson began working on her debut album Who I Am, originally set for release in late 2007, but was pushed back to early 2008. Three singles were released from the album; "Don't Miss You" and "Not Me" in 2007, and "Ready to Fly" in 2008. "Don't Miss You" was a top 20 hit and certified gold.

Pearson attended the world premiere for Lord Richard Attenborough's film Closing the Ring, for which she sang the main single "Lost Without Your Love", which she stated would be released in 2008. Pearson also featured on Seany B's single "B Good 2 Me".

In early 2008, Pearson starred in television commercials on Australian network 7 singing "Ready to Fly". The advertisement digitally placed her atop the Great Wall of China, endorsing the commencement of the 2008 Olympic Games. Another version of "Ready to Fly", a duet with Indonesian singer Rio Febrian, was released with a music video.

The album Who I Am was released in Japan in late 2008, with Pearson travelling there to promote it.

According to her Twitter account in 2008, she had been in LA working with producers the Heavyweights and Rodney Jerkins, who at the time had worked with Lady Gaga, Beyoncé, Anastacia (on her fourth studio album Heavy Rotation), and Sheppard Solomon, who has worked with Natalie Imbruglia and Kelly Clarkson, among others. Confirmed tracks included "Doctor Love" and "Aftershock", co-written with production team Dreamlab consisting of singer-songwriter Leah Haywood and her husband Daniel James.

Also, along with Klaus Derendorf and Tom Nichols, Pearson also shares a writing credit on British singer and actress Dani Harmer's debut single "Free", which was released in the UK on 25 May 2009, taken from Harmer's upcoming album. The song was originally recorded by Pearson herself and was made an iTunes-only B-side of her single "Don't Miss You" in 2007.

The first single from the second album, "Butterfingers" was released in October 2009 and failed to chart in Australia, leading Pearson to part with Sony BMG in January 2010.

=== 2010–present ===
In 2010, Pearson wrote the club number 1 and ARIA top 10 hit "Freefallin" with Denzal Park and performed by Zoe Badwi. "Freefallin" earned Pearson and Park an APRA Dance Work of 2011 award in June 2011 and an ARIA nomination.

Pearson's song "Aftershock" from her cancelled second album was covered by Demi Lovato and features as a bonus track on the latter's third album Unbroken, released on 20 September 2011.

In December 2011, Pearson joined forces with Sony/ATV Publishing signing a worldwide contract and beginning a new career in the UK. She wrote "Good Love" with DEVolution and performed vocals on the track.

In 2013, "Hurricane" was released by Myon & Shane54 featuring Pearson.

On 18 December 2017, Last Encore featured her vocals on "Fearless".

In 2017, she released the singles "Feel U Moving" and "Say What, You Want" with Chris Brogan.

In January 2018, Pearson was featured on the single "Thinking About You", performed by Selekio.

In 2018, the Audition Next Level game was released, which includes the song "Hurricane".

On 14 June 2019, the single "What Do You Feel" by Jolyon Petch and Mind Electric featuring Pearson was released.

In October 2019, Pearson featured on "Rebel Love" by Murph & Petch.

In November 2019, Pearson featured on "Give It All" by J Cannons and Steve Hart.

== Discography ==
=== Studio albums ===
Title	Album details	Peak chart positions
Title	Album details	AUS
Who I Am	Released: 19 April 2008; Label: Sony BMG Australia; Format: CD, digital download	39

=== Singles ===
Title	Year	Peak chart positions	Album
Title	Year	AUS	Album
"Don't Miss You"	2007	19	Who I Am
"Not Me"	2007	37	Who I Am
"Ready to Fly"	2008	40	Who I Am
"Butterfingers"	2009	—	Non-album singles
"What Do You Feel" (Jolyon Petch with Mind Electric featuring Amy Pearson)	2019	—	Non-album singles
"Rebel Love" (Petch with Mind Electric featuring Amy Pearson)	2019	—	Non-album singles
